= Elections in Utah =

United States presidential election results for Utah
Year	Republican		Democratic		Third party(ies)	
Year	No.	%	No.	%	No.	%
1896	13,491	17.27%	64,607	82.70%	21	0.03%
1900	47,139	50.58%	45,006	48.30%	1,044	1.12%
1904	62,446	61.42%	33,413	32.86%	5,813	5.72%
1908	61,028	56.19%	42,601	39.22%	4,984	4.59%
1912	42,100	37.46%	36,579	32.55%	33,707	29.99%
1916	54,137	37.82%	84,145	58.78%	4,864	3.40%
1920	81,555	55.93%	56,639	38.84%	7,634	5.23%
1924	77,327	49.26%	47,001	29.94%	32,662	20.81%
1928	94,618	53.58%	80,985	45.86%	1,000	0.57%
1932	84,795	41.05%	116,750	56.52%	5,033	2.44%
1936	64,555	29.79%	150,246	69.34%	1,876	0.87%
1940	93,151	37.59%	154,277	62.25%	391	0.16%
1944	97,891	39.42%	150,088	60.44%	340	0.14%
1948	124,402	45.02%	149,151	53.98%	2,752	1.00%
1952	194,190	58.93%	135,364	41.07%	0	0.00%
1956	215,631	64.56%	118,364	35.44%	0	0.00%
1960	205,361	54.81%	169,248	45.17%	100	0.03%
1964	180,682	45.14%	219,628	54.86%	0	0.00%
1968	238,728	56.49%	156,665	37.07%	27,175	6.43%
1972	323,643	67.64%	126,284	26.39%	28,549	5.97%
1976	337,908	62.44%	182,110	33.65%	21,180	3.91%
1980	439,687	72.77%	124,266	20.57%	40,269	6.66%
1984	469,105	74.50%	155,369	24.68%	5,182	0.82%
1988	428,442	66.22%	207,343	32.05%	11,223	1.73%
1992	322,632	43.36%	183,429	24.65%	238,008	31.99%
1996	361,911	54.37%	221,633	33.30%	82,085	12.33%
2000	515,096	66.83%	203,053	26.34%	52,605	6.83%
2004	663,742	71.54%	241,199	26.00%	22,903	2.47%
2008	596,030	62.15%	327,670	34.17%	35,296	3.68%
2012	740,600	72.55%	251,813	24.67%	28,448	2.79%
2016	515,231	45.05%	310,676	27.16%	317,825	27.79%
2020	865,140	57.45%	560,282	37.20%	80,560	5.35%
2024	883,818	58.40%	562,566	37.17%	67,014	4.43%

Elections in Utah are held to fill various local, state, and federal seats. Special elections may be held to fill vacancies at other points in time.

Utah votes predominantly Republican. Self-identified Latter-day Saints are more likely to vote for the Republican ticket than non-Mormons. Utah is one of the most Republican states in the nation. Utah was the single most Republican-leaning state in the country in every presidential election from 1976 to 2004, measured by the percentage point margin between the Republican and Democratic candidates. In 2008 Utah was only the third-most Republican state (after Wyoming and Oklahoma), but in 2012, with Mormon Mitt Romney atop the Republican ticket, Utah returned to its position as the most Republican state. However, the 2016 presidential election result saw Republican Donald Trump carry the state with only a plurality, the first time this happened since 1992.

In a 2020 study, Utah was ranked as the 3rd easiest state for citizens to vote in.

== National legislative ==
- 2022 United States Senate election in Utah
- 2018 United States Senate election in Utah
- 2016 United States Senate election in Utah
- 2016 United States House of Representatives elections in Utah
- 2014 United States House of Representatives elections in Utah
- 2012 United States Senate election in Utah
- 2012 United States House of Representatives elections in Utah
- 2010 United States Senate election in Utah
- 2008 United States House of Representatives elections in Utah
- 2006 United States House of Representatives elections in Utah
- 2006 United States Senate election in Utah
- 2004 United States Senate election in Utah
- 1976 United States Senate election in Utah

== State executive ==
- 2020 Utah gubernatorial election
- 2016 Utah gubernatorial election
- 2012 Utah gubernatorial election
- 2010 Utah gubernatorial special election
- 2008 Utah gubernatorial election
- 2004 Utah gubernatorial election
- 2000 Utah gubernatorial election
- 1996 Utah gubernatorial election
- 1992 Utah gubernatorial election

== State legislative ==
- 2022 Utah elections
- 2020 Utah elections
- 2018 Utah elections
- 2016 Utah elections
- 2014 Utah elections
- 2012 Utah elections
- 2010 Utah elections

== See also ==
- Political party strength in Utah
- Women's suffrage in Utah
