= Bob Bennett (politician) =

American politician (1933–2016)

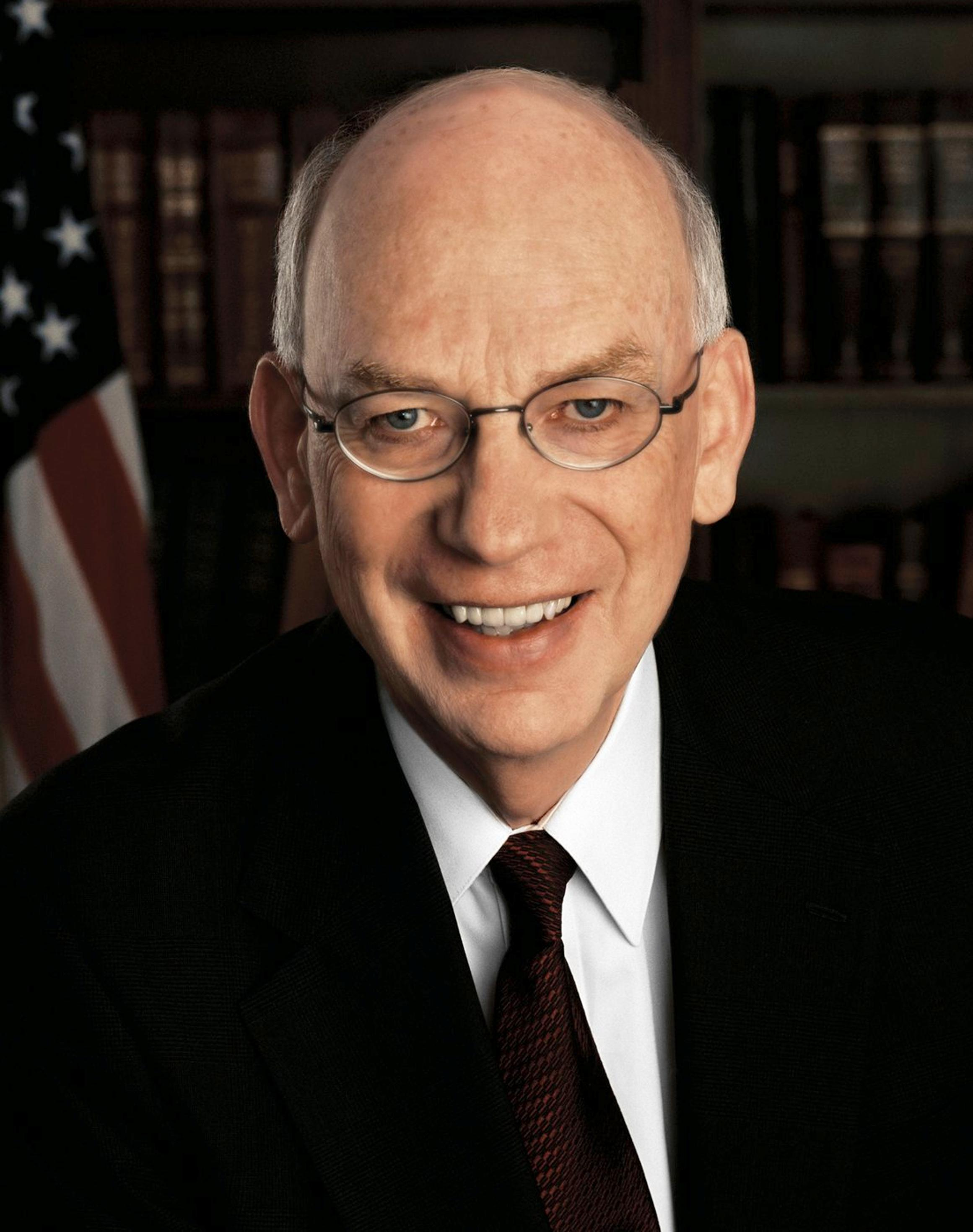
- Official portrait, 2005

United States Senator from Utah
- In office January 3, 1993 – January 3, 2011
- Preceded by: Jake Garn
- Succeeded by: Mike Lee

Personal details
- Born: Robert Foster Bennett; September 18, 1933 Salt Lake City, Utah, U.S.
- Died: May 4, 2016 (aged 82) Arlington, Virginia, U.S.
- Resting place: Salt Lake City Cemetery
- Party: Republican
- Spouse: Joyce McKay (m. 1962)
- Children: 6
- Parent: Wallace F. Bennett (father)
- Education: University of Utah (BS)

Military service
- Branch/service: United States Army
- Years of service: 1957–1969
- Unit: Utah Army National Guard; Army Chaplain Corps
- Bennett's voice Bennett on the death of Gordon B. Hinckley, then-president of The Church of Jesus Christ of Latter-day Saints; Recorded January 28, 2008

Robert Foster Bennett (September 18, 1933 – May 4, 2016) was an American politician and businessman who served as a United States senator from Utah from 1993 to 2011. A member of the Republican Party, Bennett held chairmanships and senior positions on various key Senate committees, including the Banking, Housing and Urban Affairs Committee; Appropriations Committee; Rules and Administration Committee; Energy and Natural Resources Committee; and Joint Economic Committee. Bennett spent his entire tenure in the Senate alongside Utah's senior senator, Orrin Hatch.

Bennett was a popular and reliably conservative senator for most of his tenure, earning high ratings from conservative activist groups such as the NRA Political Victory Fund, the U.S. Chamber of Commerce, and the American Conservative Union. However, in 2010, Bennett became one of the most prominent targets of the Tea Party Movement, which criticized his support of the Bush administration's bank bailout and argued that Bennett was insufficiently conservative. Despite an enthusiastic endorsement from Mitt Romney, Bennett was denied a place on the primary ballot by the 2010 Utah State Republican Convention, placing third behind two Tea-Party-backed candidates.

Following his exit from the Senate, Bennett joined the law firm Arent Fox as senior policy advisor. He also became chairman of Bennett Group, a consulting firm with offices in Salt Lake City and Washington, D.C., and announced his intention to become a registered lobbyist in early 2013, after being out of office for the legally required two years. He served as a senior fellow at the Bipartisan Policy Center, where he focused on budget, energy, and health issues. Bennett was also a part-time teacher, researcher, and lecturer at the University of Utah's Hinckley Institute of Politics and was a fellow at the George Washington University School of Media and Public Affairs. He was a member of the board of the German Marshall Fund.

== Early life, education, and business career ==
Born on September 18, 1933, in Salt Lake City, Utah, Bennett was the son of Frances Marion (née Grant) and the U.S. Senator Wallace Foster Bennett, as well as a grandson of Heber J. Grant, the seventh president of the Church of Jesus Christ of Latter-day Saints (LDS Church) and a great-grandson of Jedediah M. Grant (Heber J. Grant's father) and Daniel H. Wells (through Heber J. Grant's wife Emily H. Wells), early mayors of Salt Lake City and counselors in the First Presidency of the LDS Church.

Bennett attended high school at East High, and he earned his B.S. from the University of Utah in 1957 majoring in Political Science. He also served as the Student Body President at the University of Utah and was initiated into Owl and Key. After graduation in 1957, Bennett joined the Utah Army National Guard and spent six months on active duty. Upon his return, he was commissioned a Chaplain in the Guard and served until 1960.

In 1963 he went to Washington as press secretary to a Utah Congressman, Sherman P. Lloyd, and later as administrative assistant to his father. He became the head of the Governmental Affairs office of the J. C. Penney Company in 1965 but resigned from Penney's to accept an appointment in the Nixon Administration, as Director of Congressional Affairs in the United States Department of Transportation. He held this position through 1969 and 1970, leaving in 1971 to purchase the Robert Mullen Company, a Washington, D.C., public-relations company. While at Mullen, Bennett was chair of several dummy committees that funneled corporate donations into Nixon's 1972 re-election campaign

Bennett's principal client was the CIA-aligned Summa Corporation, the holding company of billionaire Howard Hughes. In 1974, after his CIA ties and those of the Mullen Company had been revealed by the Watergate scandal. (Note: Cited as appearing in "Strange Bedfellows", Howard Kohn, Rolling Stone, May 6, 1976)

He subsequently became chairman of American Computer Corporation, and then president of the Microsonics Corporation, a public firm listed on NASDAQ. In 1984, Bennett was named as the CEO of the Franklin International Institute, a startup that produced Franklin Day Planners and grew into Franklin Quest, which was listed on the New York Stock Exchange in 1992. After being named Entrepreneur of the Year for the Rocky Mountain Region by Inc. Magazine, he stepped down as CEO in 1991, prior to his run for the Senate.

== U.S. Senate (1993–2011) ==
=== Elections ===
A Senate seat opened up in 1992, when Jake Garn declined to enter the race for a fourth term. Bennett narrowly won the heavily contested Republican Party primary election (with 51% of the votes cast) in 1992, his primary opponent being Joseph A. Cannon, another millionaire with prominent LDS forebears. Bennett then went on to defeat his Democratic opponent, Congressman Wayne Owens, in the general election. He was re-elected in 1998 and 2004.

Bennett was challenged by seven other Republicans and two Democrats in his bid for re-election in 2010, including Mike Lee, Cherilyn Eagar, Tim Bridgewater, and Democrats Sam Granato and Christopher Stout. Utah Attorney General Mark Shurtleff dropped out of the race, citing family concerns.

Despite a strong approval rating among statewide voters, Bennett was defeated on May 8, 2010, at the Utah Republican Convention after finishing third in the second round of balloting, to Mike Lee and Tim Bridgewater.

After the convention, Senator Bennett was widely encouraged by his constituents and colleagues to pursue a write-in bid to retain his U.S. Senate seat, but ultimately declined, citing the toxic atmosphere such a bid would bring to the state's political environment.

=== Tenure ===
During the 106th Congress, Bennett was tapped by then Majority Leader, Bill Frist, to serve as the Chief Deputy Republican Party "Whip". Later, as Counsel to Mitch McConnell, Senator Bennett was an influential member of the Republican Leadership Team and advised the Minority Leader on "legislative strategy and policy priorities".

==== Abortion ====
Bennett was a strong opponent of abortion and supported measures to restrict it. These included requirements of parental notification for one to take place and bans on allowing minors to cross state lines to obtain the procedure and late-term abortions. He showed some support, however, for embryonic stem cell research.

==== LGBT issues ====
On March 25, 2010, during the Health Care and Education Reconciliation Act of 2010 debate, the U.S. Senate defeated an attempt by Bennett to "suspend the issuance of marriage licenses to any couple of the same sex until the people of the District of Columbia have the opportunity to hold a referendum or initiative on the question".

==== Civil Liberties ====
Bennett supported Bush Administration wiretapping proposals. He was one of only three Republican senators to vote against a proposed constitutional ban on flag burning.

==== Economy ====
Bennett was a supporter of a flat tax and also was a leading voice for the repeal of the inheritance tax, alternative minimum tax, and "marriage penalty". He stated that it was unfair for the tax burden to fall on the wealthiest one percent of the population. Bennett voted against minimum wage increases and bills that would increase the ease in which workers could organize.

A free trade advocate, Bennett voted in favor of CAFTA, presidential fast-tracking for normalizing trade relations, and removing common goods from national security export controls. He favored recent trade deals with countries such as Chile, Singapore, and Oman.

==== Health care ====
Bennett was an opponent of public health care and blamed government policies for the high cost of insurance. He voted against proposals to expand government health care, such as those that would let Medicare negotiate in bulk with drug companies or those that would enroll more children in federally provided insurance. He also voted against the State Children's Health Insurance Program. During his final Senate campaign, he stated that high taxes were causing insurers to pass the costs off to customers. He believed that new drugs were not being properly developed because pharmaceutical companies feared lawsuits if unexpected side effects occurred.

Bennett was the lead Republican sponsor of the Healthy Americans Act, championed by Democratic Senator Ron Wyden.

==== Immigration ====
Bennett had a mixed record on immigration control. He voted in favor of the fence along the Mexico–United States border, making English the nation's official language and denying citizenship to guest workers. He voted for the 2006 Comprehensive Immigration Reform Act, which would have granted legalization of status to an estimated 12 million illegal immigrants.

==== National security ====
Bennett was a supporter of the PATRIOT Act. He voted no on limiting the tours of duty for soldiers in Iraq and on granting habeas corpus rights to detainees in Guantanamo Bay.

==== Energy ====
Bennett earned a lifetime score of 6% from the League of Conservation Voters. He was against Corporate Average Fuel Economy standards, defining goals for a 40 percent reduction in oil use by 2025 and factoring global warming into government planning. Bennett supported Arctic National Wildlife Refuge drilling and using nuclear power as an energy solution. He also voted against providing emergency energy funding to Louisiana after Hurricane Katrina.

=== Committee assignments ===
- Committee on Appropriations
  - Subcommittee on Agriculture, Rural Development, Food and Drug Administration, and Related Agencies
  - Subcommittee on Defense
  - Subcommittee on Energy and Water Development (Ranking Member)
  - Subcommittee on Interior, Environment, and Related Agencies
  - Subcommittee on State, Foreign Operations, and Related Programs
  - Subcommittee on Transportation, Housing and Urban Development, and Related Agencies
- Committee on Banking, Housing, and Urban Affairs
  - Subcommittee on Financial Institutions
  - Subcommittee on Securities, Insurance and Investment
  - Subcommittee on Security and International Trade and Finance
- Committee on Energy and Natural Resources
  - Subcommittee on Energy
  - Subcommittee on Public Lands and Forests
  - Subcommittee on Water and Power
- Committee on Rules and Administration (Ranking Member)
- Joint Committee on the Library
- Joint Committee on Printing
- Joint Economic Committee

== Personal life ==
In 1962, Bennett married Joyce McKay, a granddaughter of David O. McKay, the ninth president of the LDS Church. This couple has six children: Julie, Robert, James, Wendy, Heather, and Heidi. Bob and Joyce together have 20 grandchildren.

Bennett died on May 4, 2016, aged 82, at his home in Arlington, Virginia, after suffering from pancreatic cancer and a stroke.

Bennett spent the last days of his life apologizing to the Muslim community for controversial rhetoric from Republican presidential candidates, including the eventual nominee and overall victor, Donald Trump.

== Electoral history ==
1992 U.S. Senate election – Republican Primary
Candidate	Pct	Candidate	Pct
Robert F. Bennett	51%	Joseph A. Cannon	49%

Utah Senator (Class III) results: 1992–2004
Year	Democrat	Votes	Pct	Republican	Votes	Pct	3rd Party	Party	Votes	Pct
1992	Wayne Owens	301,228	40%	Robert F. Bennett	420,069	55%	Anita R. Morrow	Populist	17,549	2%
1992	Wayne Owens	301,228	40%	Robert F. Bennett	420,069	55%	Maury Modine	Libertarian	14,341	2%
1992	Wayne Owens	301,228	40%	Robert F. Bennett	420,069	55%	Patricia Grogan	Socialist Workers	5,292	1%
1998	Scott Leckman	163,172	33%	Robert F. Bennett	316,652	64%	Gary R. Van Horn	Independent American	15,073	3%
2004	Paul Van Dam	258,955	28%	Robert F. Bennett	626,640	69%	Gary R. Van Horn	Constitution	17,289	2%
2004	Paul Van Dam	258,955	28%	Robert F. Bennett	626,640	69%	Joe LaBonte	Personal Choice	8,824	1%

* Write-in and minor candidate notes: In 1998, write-ins received 12 votes. In 2004, write-ins received 18 votes.

2010 Republican State Convention results (first round)
Party	Candidate	Votes	%
Republican	Mike Lee	982	28.75
Republican	Tim Bridgewater	917	26.84
Republican	Bob Bennett	885	25.91
Republican	Cherilyn Eagar	541	15.84
Republican	Merrill Cook	49	1.43
Republican	Leonard Fabiano	22	0.64
Republican	Jeremy Friedbaum	16	0.47
Republican	David Chiu	4	0.12
Total votes		3,416	100.00

2010 Republican State Convention results (second round)
Party	Candidate	Votes	%
Republican	Tim Bridgewater	1,274	37.42
Republican	Mike Lee	1,225	35.99
Republican	Bob Bennett	905	26.99
Total votes		3,404	100.00

== See also ==
Party political offices
Preceded by Jake Garn	Republican nominee for U.S. Senator from Utah (Class 3); 1992, 1998, 2004	Succeeded by Mike Lee
New office	Senate Republican Chief Deputy Whip; 2003–2007	Succeeded by John Thune
Preceded by Chris Dodd	Ranking Member of the Senate Rules Committee; 2007–2011	Succeeded by Lamar Alexander
U.S. Senate
Preceded by Jake Garn	United States Senator (Class 3) from Utah; 1993–2011; Served alongside: Orrin Hatch	Succeeded by Mike Lee
