= SWPA =

SWPA may refer to:

- South West Pacific Area (command), an Allied command during World War II
- South West Pacific theatre of World War II, a theatre of operations
- Sony World Photography Awards, an international annual photo contest held since 2008
- Southwestern Power Administration, an agency of the U.S. Department of Energy
