= United States Senate Energy Subcommittee on Water and Power =

US Senate subcommittee of the Committee on Energy and Natural Resources

The United States Senate Energy and Natural Resources Subcommittee on Water and Power is one of four subcommittees of the U.S. Senate Energy and Natural Resources Committee.

== Jurisdiction ==
This subcommittee's jurisdiction includes oversight and legislative responsibilities for: United States Bureau of Reclamation irrigation and reclamation projects, including related flood control purposes; federal power marketing administrations, (e.g., Bonneville Power Administration, Southwestern Power Administration, Western Area Power Administration, Southeastern Power Administration); energy development impacts on water resources; groundwater resources and management; hydroelectric power; and energy related aspects of deepwater ports.

== Members, 119th Congress ==
Majority	Minority
John Hoeven, North Dakota, Chair; Jim Risch, Idaho; Steve Daines, Montana; Dave McCormick, Pennsylvania; Jim Justice, West Virginia; Bill Cassidy, Louisiana	Ron Wyden, Oregon, Ranking Member; Catherine Cortez Masto, Nevada; John Hickenlooper, Colorado; Alex Padilla, California; Ruben Gallego, Arizona
Ex Officio
Mike Lee, Utah	Martin Heinrich, New Mexico

== Historical subcommittee rosters ==
=== 118th Congress ===
Majority	Minority
Ron Wyden, Oregon, Chair; Bernie Sanders, Vermont; Catherine Cortez Masto, Nevada; John Hickenlooper, Colorado; Alex Padilla, California	Jim Risch, Idaho, Ranking Member; Mike Lee, Utah; John Hoeven, North Dakota; Bill Cassidy, Louisiana
Ex Officio
Joe Manchin, West Virginia	John Barrasso, Wyoming

== See also ==
- U.S. House Natural Resources Subcommittee on Water and Power
