= List of United States senators from Utah =

Current delegation

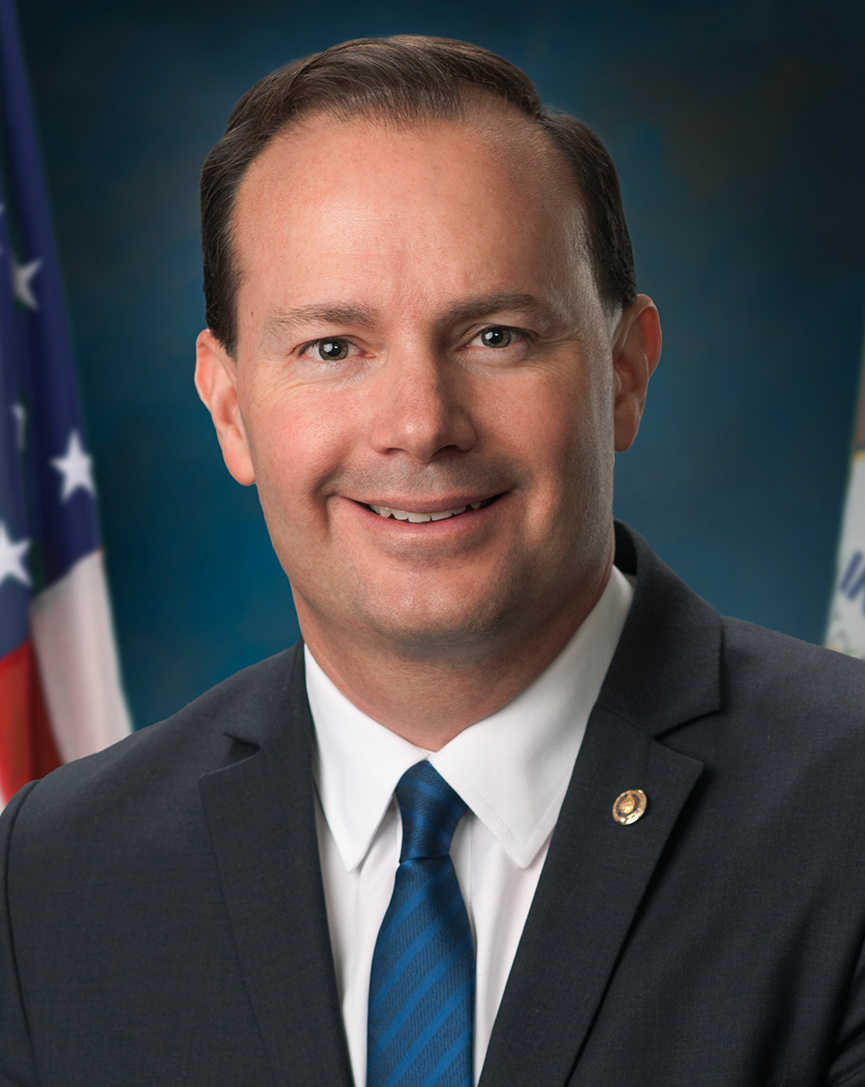
Mike Lee (R)

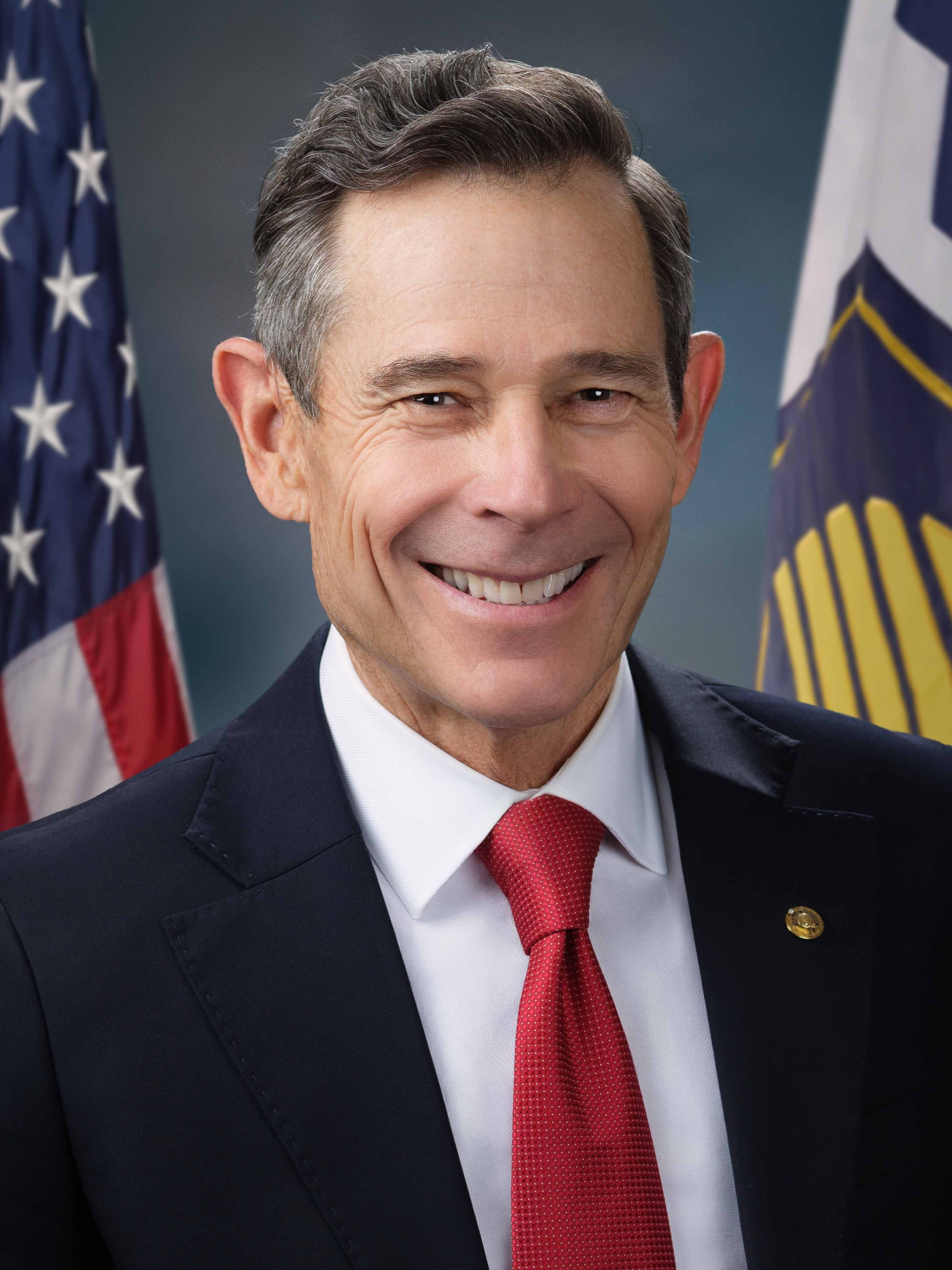
John Curtis (R)

(ordered by seniority)

Utah was admitted to the Union on January 4, 1896, and it popularly elects U.S. senators to class 1 and class 3, despite the Utah State Legislature's rejection of the Seventeenth Amendment to the United States Constitution when it was passed in 1913. Its current senators are Republicans Mike Lee (since 2011) and John Curtis (since 2025). Orrin Hatch was Utah's longest-serving senator (1977–2019).

Since 1977, Utah has been occupied by Republican senators.

== List of senators ==
Class 1 Class 1 senators belong to the electoral cycle that most recently had regular elections in 2006, 2012, 2018, and 2024. The next election will be in 2030.						C	Class 3 Class 3 senators belong to the electoral cycle that most recently had regular elections in 2004, 2010, 2016, and 2022. The next election will be in 2028.					
#	Senator	Party	Dates in office	Electoral history	T	C	T	Electoral history	Dates in office	Party	Senator	#
Vacant			Jan 4, 1896 – Jan 22, 1896	Utah elected its senators 18 days after statehood.	1	54th	1	Utah elected its senators 18 days after statehood.	Jan 4, 1896 – Jan 22, 1896	Vacant		
1	Frank J. Cannon (Ogden)	Republican	Jan 22, 1896 – Mar 3, 1899	Elected in 1896.	1	54th	1	Elected in 1896. Retired.	Jan 22, 1896 – Mar 3, 1897	Republican	Arthur Brown (Salt Lake City)	1
1	Frank J. Cannon (Ogden)	Silver; Republican	Jan 22, 1896 – Mar 3, 1899	Elected in 1896.	1	55th	2	Elected in 1897. Lost re-election.	Mar 4, 1897 – Mar 3, 1903	Democratic	Joseph L. Rawlins (Salt Lake City)	2
Vacant			Mar 4, 1899 – Jan 23, 1901	Legislature failed to elect.	2	56th	2	Elected in 1897. Lost re-election.	Mar 4, 1897 – Mar 3, 1903	Democratic	Joseph L. Rawlins (Salt Lake City)	2
2	Thomas Kearns (Salt Lake City)	Republican	Jan 23, 1901 – Mar 3, 1905	Elected late in 1901. Retired.	2	56th	2	Elected in 1897. Lost re-election.	Mar 4, 1897 – Mar 3, 1903	Democratic	Joseph L. Rawlins (Salt Lake City)	2
2	Thomas Kearns (Salt Lake City)	Republican	Jan 23, 1901 – Mar 3, 1905	Elected late in 1901. Retired.	2	57th	2	Elected in 1897. Lost re-election.	Mar 4, 1897 – Mar 3, 1903	Democratic	Joseph L. Rawlins (Salt Lake City)	2
2	Thomas Kearns (Salt Lake City)	Republican	Jan 23, 1901 – Mar 3, 1905	Elected late in 1901. Retired.	2	58th	3	Elected in 1903.	Mar 4, 1903 – Mar 3, 1933	Republican	Reed Smoot (Provo)	3
3	George Sutherland (Salt Lake City)	Republican	Mar 4, 1905 – Mar 3, 1917	Elected in 1905.	3	59th	3	Elected in 1903.	Mar 4, 1903 – Mar 3, 1933	Republican	Reed Smoot (Provo)	3
3	George Sutherland (Salt Lake City)	Republican	Mar 4, 1905 – Mar 3, 1917	Elected in 1905.	3	60th	3	Elected in 1903.	Mar 4, 1903 – Mar 3, 1933	Republican	Reed Smoot (Provo)	3
3	George Sutherland (Salt Lake City)	Republican	Mar 4, 1905 – Mar 3, 1917	Elected in 1905.	3	61st	4	Re-elected in 1909.	Mar 4, 1903 – Mar 3, 1933	Republican	Reed Smoot (Provo)	3
3	George Sutherland (Salt Lake City)	Republican	Mar 4, 1905 – Mar 3, 1917	Re-elected in 1911. Lost re-election.	4	62nd	4	Re-elected in 1909.	Mar 4, 1903 – Mar 3, 1933	Republican	Reed Smoot (Provo)	3
3	George Sutherland (Salt Lake City)	Republican	Mar 4, 1905 – Mar 3, 1917	Re-elected in 1911. Lost re-election.	4	63rd	4	Re-elected in 1909.	Mar 4, 1903 – Mar 3, 1933	Republican	Reed Smoot (Provo)	3
3	George Sutherland (Salt Lake City)	Republican	Mar 4, 1905 – Mar 3, 1917	Re-elected in 1911. Lost re-election.	4	64th	5	Re-elected in 1914.	Mar 4, 1903 – Mar 3, 1933	Republican	Reed Smoot (Provo)	3
4	William H. King (Salt Lake City)	Democratic	Mar 4, 1917 – Jan 3, 1941	Elected in 1916.	5	65th	5	Re-elected in 1914.	Mar 4, 1903 – Mar 3, 1933	Republican	Reed Smoot (Provo)	3
4	William H. King (Salt Lake City)	Democratic	Mar 4, 1917 – Jan 3, 1941	Elected in 1916.	5	66th	5	Re-elected in 1914.	Mar 4, 1903 – Mar 3, 1933	Republican	Reed Smoot (Provo)	3
4	William H. King (Salt Lake City)	Democratic	Mar 4, 1917 – Jan 3, 1941	Elected in 1916.	5	67th	6	Re-elected in 1920.	Mar 4, 1903 – Mar 3, 1933	Republican	Reed Smoot (Provo)	3
4	William H. King (Salt Lake City)	Democratic	Mar 4, 1917 – Jan 3, 1941	Re-elected in 1922.	6	68th	6	Re-elected in 1920.	Mar 4, 1903 – Mar 3, 1933	Republican	Reed Smoot (Provo)	3
4	William H. King (Salt Lake City)	Democratic	Mar 4, 1917 – Jan 3, 1941	Re-elected in 1922.	6	69th	6	Re-elected in 1920.	Mar 4, 1903 – Mar 3, 1933	Republican	Reed Smoot (Provo)	3
4	William H. King (Salt Lake City)	Democratic	Mar 4, 1917 – Jan 3, 1941	Re-elected in 1922.	6	70th	7	Re-elected in 1926. Lost re-election.	Mar 4, 1903 – Mar 3, 1933	Republican	Reed Smoot (Provo)	3
4	William H. King (Salt Lake City)	Democratic	Mar 4, 1917 – Jan 3, 1941	Re-elected in 1928.	7	71st	7	Re-elected in 1926. Lost re-election.	Mar 4, 1903 – Mar 3, 1933	Republican	Reed Smoot (Provo)	3
4	William H. King (Salt Lake City)	Democratic	Mar 4, 1917 – Jan 3, 1941	Re-elected in 1928.	7	72nd	7	Re-elected in 1926. Lost re-election.	Mar 4, 1903 – Mar 3, 1933	Republican	Reed Smoot (Provo)	3
4	William H. King (Salt Lake City)	Democratic	Mar 4, 1917 – Jan 3, 1941	Re-elected in 1928.	7	73rd	8	Elected in 1932.	Mar 4, 1933 – Jan 3, 1951	Democratic	Elbert D. Thomas (Salt Lake City)	4
4	William H. King (Salt Lake City)	Democratic	Mar 4, 1917 – Jan 3, 1941	Re-elected in 1934. Lost renomination.	8	74th	8	Elected in 1932.	Mar 4, 1933 – Jan 3, 1951	Democratic	Elbert D. Thomas (Salt Lake City)	4
4	William H. King (Salt Lake City)	Democratic	Mar 4, 1917 – Jan 3, 1941	Re-elected in 1934. Lost renomination.	8	75th	8	Elected in 1932.	Mar 4, 1933 – Jan 3, 1951	Democratic	Elbert D. Thomas (Salt Lake City)	4
4	William H. King (Salt Lake City)	Democratic	Mar 4, 1917 – Jan 3, 1941	Re-elected in 1934. Lost renomination.	8	76th	9	Re-elected in 1938.	Mar 4, 1933 – Jan 3, 1951	Democratic	Elbert D. Thomas (Salt Lake City)	4
5	Abe Murdock (Beaver)	Democratic	Jan 3, 1941 – Jan 3, 1947	Elected in 1940. Lost re-election.	9	77th	9	Re-elected in 1938.	Mar 4, 1933 – Jan 3, 1951	Democratic	Elbert D. Thomas (Salt Lake City)	4
5	Abe Murdock (Beaver)	Democratic	Jan 3, 1941 – Jan 3, 1947	Elected in 1940. Lost re-election.	9	78th	9	Re-elected in 1938.	Mar 4, 1933 – Jan 3, 1951	Democratic	Elbert D. Thomas (Salt Lake City)	4
5	Abe Murdock (Beaver)	Democratic	Jan 3, 1941 – Jan 3, 1947	Elected in 1940. Lost re-election.	9	79th	10	Re-elected in 1944. Lost re-election.	Mar 4, 1933 – Jan 3, 1951	Democratic	Elbert D. Thomas (Salt Lake City)	4
6	Arthur V. Watkins (Orem)	Republican	Jan 3, 1947 – Jan 3, 1959	Elected in 1946.	10	80th	10	Re-elected in 1944. Lost re-election.	Mar 4, 1933 – Jan 3, 1951	Democratic	Elbert D. Thomas (Salt Lake City)	4
6	Arthur V. Watkins (Orem)	Republican	Jan 3, 1947 – Jan 3, 1959	Elected in 1946.	10	81st	10	Re-elected in 1944. Lost re-election.	Mar 4, 1933 – Jan 3, 1951	Democratic	Elbert D. Thomas (Salt Lake City)	4
6	Arthur V. Watkins (Orem)	Republican	Jan 3, 1947 – Jan 3, 1959	Elected in 1946.	10	82nd	11	Elected in 1950.	Jan 3, 1951 – Dec 20, 1974	Republican	Wallace F. Bennett (Salt Lake City)	5
6	Arthur V. Watkins (Orem)	Republican	Jan 3, 1947 – Jan 3, 1959	Re-elected in 1952. Lost re-election.	11	83rd	11	Elected in 1950.	Jan 3, 1951 – Dec 20, 1974	Republican	Wallace F. Bennett (Salt Lake City)	5
6	Arthur V. Watkins (Orem)	Republican	Jan 3, 1947 – Jan 3, 1959	Re-elected in 1952. Lost re-election.	11	84th	11	Elected in 1950.	Jan 3, 1951 – Dec 20, 1974	Republican	Wallace F. Bennett (Salt Lake City)	5
6	Arthur V. Watkins (Orem)	Republican	Jan 3, 1947 – Jan 3, 1959	Re-elected in 1952. Lost re-election.	11	85th	12	Re-elected in 1956.	Jan 3, 1951 – Dec 20, 1974	Republican	Wallace F. Bennett (Salt Lake City)	5
7	Frank Moss (Salt Lake City)	Democratic	Jan 3, 1959 – Jan 3, 1977	Elected in 1958.	12	86th	12	Re-elected in 1956.	Jan 3, 1951 – Dec 20, 1974	Republican	Wallace F. Bennett (Salt Lake City)	5
7	Frank Moss (Salt Lake City)	Democratic	Jan 3, 1959 – Jan 3, 1977	Elected in 1958.	12	87th	12	Re-elected in 1956.	Jan 3, 1951 – Dec 20, 1974	Republican	Wallace F. Bennett (Salt Lake City)	5
7	Frank Moss (Salt Lake City)	Democratic	Jan 3, 1959 – Jan 3, 1977	Elected in 1958.	12	88th	13	Re-elected in 1962.	Jan 3, 1951 – Dec 20, 1974	Republican	Wallace F. Bennett (Salt Lake City)	5
7	Frank Moss (Salt Lake City)	Democratic	Jan 3, 1959 – Jan 3, 1977	Re-elected in 1964.	13	89th	13	Re-elected in 1962.	Jan 3, 1951 – Dec 20, 1974	Republican	Wallace F. Bennett (Salt Lake City)	5
7	Frank Moss (Salt Lake City)	Democratic	Jan 3, 1959 – Jan 3, 1977	Re-elected in 1964.	13	90th	13	Re-elected in 1962.	Jan 3, 1951 – Dec 20, 1974	Republican	Wallace F. Bennett (Salt Lake City)	5
7	Frank Moss (Salt Lake City)	Democratic	Jan 3, 1959 – Jan 3, 1977	Re-elected in 1964.	13	91st	14	Re-elected in 1968. Retired, and resigned early to give successor preferential seniority.	Jan 3, 1951 – Dec 20, 1974	Republican	Wallace F. Bennett (Salt Lake City)	5
7	Frank Moss (Salt Lake City)	Democratic	Jan 3, 1959 – Jan 3, 1977	Re-elected in 1970. Lost re-election.	14	92nd	14	Re-elected in 1968. Retired, and resigned early to give successor preferential seniority.	Jan 3, 1951 – Dec 20, 1974	Republican	Wallace F. Bennett (Salt Lake City)	5
7	Frank Moss (Salt Lake City)	Democratic	Jan 3, 1959 – Jan 3, 1977	Re-elected in 1970. Lost re-election.	14	93rd	14	Re-elected in 1968. Retired, and resigned early to give successor preferential seniority.	Jan 3, 1951 – Dec 20, 1974	Republican	Wallace F. Bennett (Salt Lake City)	5
7	Frank Moss (Salt Lake City)	Democratic	Jan 3, 1959 – Jan 3, 1977	Re-elected in 1970. Lost re-election.	14	93rd	14	Appointed to finish Bennett's term, having been elected to the next term.	Dec 21, 1974 – Jan 3, 1993	Republican	Jake Garn (Salt Lake City)	6
7	Frank Moss (Salt Lake City)	Democratic	Jan 3, 1959 – Jan 3, 1977	Re-elected in 1970. Lost re-election.	14	94th	15	Elected in 1974.	Dec 21, 1974 – Jan 3, 1993	Republican	Jake Garn (Salt Lake City)	6
8	Orrin Hatch (Salt Lake City)	Republican	Jan 3, 1977 – Jan 3, 2019	Elected in 1976.	15	95th	15	Elected in 1974.	Dec 21, 1974 – Jan 3, 1993	Republican	Jake Garn (Salt Lake City)	6
8	Orrin Hatch (Salt Lake City)	Republican	Jan 3, 1977 – Jan 3, 2019	Elected in 1976.	15	96th	15	Elected in 1974.	Dec 21, 1974 – Jan 3, 1993	Republican	Jake Garn (Salt Lake City)	6
8	Orrin Hatch (Salt Lake City)	Republican	Jan 3, 1977 – Jan 3, 2019	Elected in 1976.	15	97th	16	Re-elected in 1980.	Dec 21, 1974 – Jan 3, 1993	Republican	Jake Garn (Salt Lake City)	6
8	Orrin Hatch (Salt Lake City)	Republican	Jan 3, 1977 – Jan 3, 2019	Re-elected in 1982.	16	98th	16	Re-elected in 1980.	Dec 21, 1974 – Jan 3, 1993	Republican	Jake Garn (Salt Lake City)	6
8	Orrin Hatch (Salt Lake City)	Republican	Jan 3, 1977 – Jan 3, 2019	Re-elected in 1982.	16	99th	16	Re-elected in 1980.	Dec 21, 1974 – Jan 3, 1993	Republican	Jake Garn (Salt Lake City)	6
8	Orrin Hatch (Salt Lake City)	Republican	Jan 3, 1977 – Jan 3, 2019	Re-elected in 1982.	16	100th	17	Re-elected in 1986. Retired.	Dec 21, 1974 – Jan 3, 1993	Republican	Jake Garn (Salt Lake City)	6
8	Orrin Hatch (Salt Lake City)	Republican	Jan 3, 1977 – Jan 3, 2019	Re-elected in 1988.	17	101st	17	Re-elected in 1986. Retired.	Dec 21, 1974 – Jan 3, 1993	Republican	Jake Garn (Salt Lake City)	6
8	Orrin Hatch (Salt Lake City)	Republican	Jan 3, 1977 – Jan 3, 2019	Re-elected in 1988.	17	102nd	17	Re-elected in 1986. Retired.	Dec 21, 1974 – Jan 3, 1993	Republican	Jake Garn (Salt Lake City)	6
8	Orrin Hatch (Salt Lake City)	Republican	Jan 3, 1977 – Jan 3, 2019	Re-elected in 1988.	17	103rd	18	Elected in 1992.	Jan 3, 1993 – Jan 3, 2011	Republican	Bob Bennett (Salt Lake City)	7
8	Orrin Hatch (Salt Lake City)	Republican	Jan 3, 1977 – Jan 3, 2019	Re-elected in 1994.	18	104th	18	Elected in 1992.	Jan 3, 1993 – Jan 3, 2011	Republican	Bob Bennett (Salt Lake City)	7
8	Orrin Hatch (Salt Lake City)	Republican	Jan 3, 1977 – Jan 3, 2019	Re-elected in 1994.	18	105th	18	Elected in 1992.	Jan 3, 1993 – Jan 3, 2011	Republican	Bob Bennett (Salt Lake City)	7
8	Orrin Hatch (Salt Lake City)	Republican	Jan 3, 1977 – Jan 3, 2019	Re-elected in 1994.	18	106th	19	Re-elected in 1998.	Jan 3, 1993 – Jan 3, 2011	Republican	Bob Bennett (Salt Lake City)	7
8	Orrin Hatch (Salt Lake City)	Republican	Jan 3, 1977 – Jan 3, 2019	Re-elected in 2000.	19	107th	19	Re-elected in 1998.	Jan 3, 1993 – Jan 3, 2011	Republican	Bob Bennett (Salt Lake City)	7
8	Orrin Hatch (Salt Lake City)	Republican	Jan 3, 1977 – Jan 3, 2019	Re-elected in 2000.	19	108th	19	Re-elected in 1998.	Jan 3, 1993 – Jan 3, 2011	Republican	Bob Bennett (Salt Lake City)	7
8	Orrin Hatch (Salt Lake City)	Republican	Jan 3, 1977 – Jan 3, 2019	Re-elected in 2000.	19	109th	20	Re-elected in 2004. Lost renomination.	Jan 3, 1993 – Jan 3, 2011	Republican	Bob Bennett (Salt Lake City)	7
8	Orrin Hatch (Salt Lake City)	Republican	Jan 3, 1977 – Jan 3, 2019	Re-elected in 2006.	20	110th	20	Re-elected in 2004. Lost renomination.	Jan 3, 1993 – Jan 3, 2011	Republican	Bob Bennett (Salt Lake City)	7
8	Orrin Hatch (Salt Lake City)	Republican	Jan 3, 1977 – Jan 3, 2019	Re-elected in 2006.	20	111th	20	Re-elected in 2004. Lost renomination.	Jan 3, 1993 – Jan 3, 2011	Republican	Bob Bennett (Salt Lake City)	7
8	Orrin Hatch (Salt Lake City)	Republican	Jan 3, 1977 – Jan 3, 2019	Re-elected in 2006.	20	112th	21	Elected in 2010.	Jan 3, 2011 – present	Republican	Mike Lee (Provo)	8
8	Orrin Hatch (Salt Lake City)	Republican	Jan 3, 1977 – Jan 3, 2019	Re-elected in 2012. Retired.	21	113th	21	Elected in 2010.	Jan 3, 2011 – present	Republican	Mike Lee (Provo)	8
8	Orrin Hatch (Salt Lake City)	Republican	Jan 3, 1977 – Jan 3, 2019	Re-elected in 2012. Retired.	21	114th	21	Elected in 2010.	Jan 3, 2011 – present	Republican	Mike Lee (Provo)	8
8	Orrin Hatch (Salt Lake City)	Republican	Jan 3, 1977 – Jan 3, 2019	Re-elected in 2012. Retired.	21	115th	22	Re-elected in 2016.	Jan 3, 2011 – present	Republican	Mike Lee (Provo)	8
9	Mitt Romney (Holladay)	Republican	Jan 3, 2019 – Jan 3, 2025	Elected in 2018. Retired.	22	116th	22	Re-elected in 2016.	Jan 3, 2011 – present	Republican	Mike Lee (Provo)	8
9	Mitt Romney (Holladay)	Republican	Jan 3, 2019 – Jan 3, 2025	Elected in 2018. Retired.	22	117th	22	Re-elected in 2016.	Jan 3, 2011 – present	Republican	Mike Lee (Provo)	8
9	Mitt Romney (Holladay)	Republican	Jan 3, 2019 – Jan 3, 2025	Elected in 2018. Retired.	22	118th	23	Re-elected in 2022.	Jan 3, 2011 – present	Republican	Mike Lee (Provo)	8
10	John Curtis (Provo)	Republican	Jan 3, 2025 – present	Elected in 2024.	23	119th	23	Re-elected in 2022.	Jan 3, 2011 – present	Republican	Mike Lee (Provo)	8
10	John Curtis (Provo)	Republican	Jan 3, 2025 – present	Elected in 2024.	23	120th	23	Re-elected in 2022.	Jan 3, 2011 – present	Republican	Mike Lee (Provo)	8
10	John Curtis (Provo)	Republican	Jan 3, 2025 – present	Elected in 2024.	23	121st	24	To be determined in the 2028 election.				
To be determined in the 2030 election.					24	122nd	24	To be determined in the 2028 election.				

== See also ==
- Elections in Utah
- List of United States representatives from Utah
- Utah's congressional delegations
