= 1998 United States Senate election in Utah =

- November 3, 1998
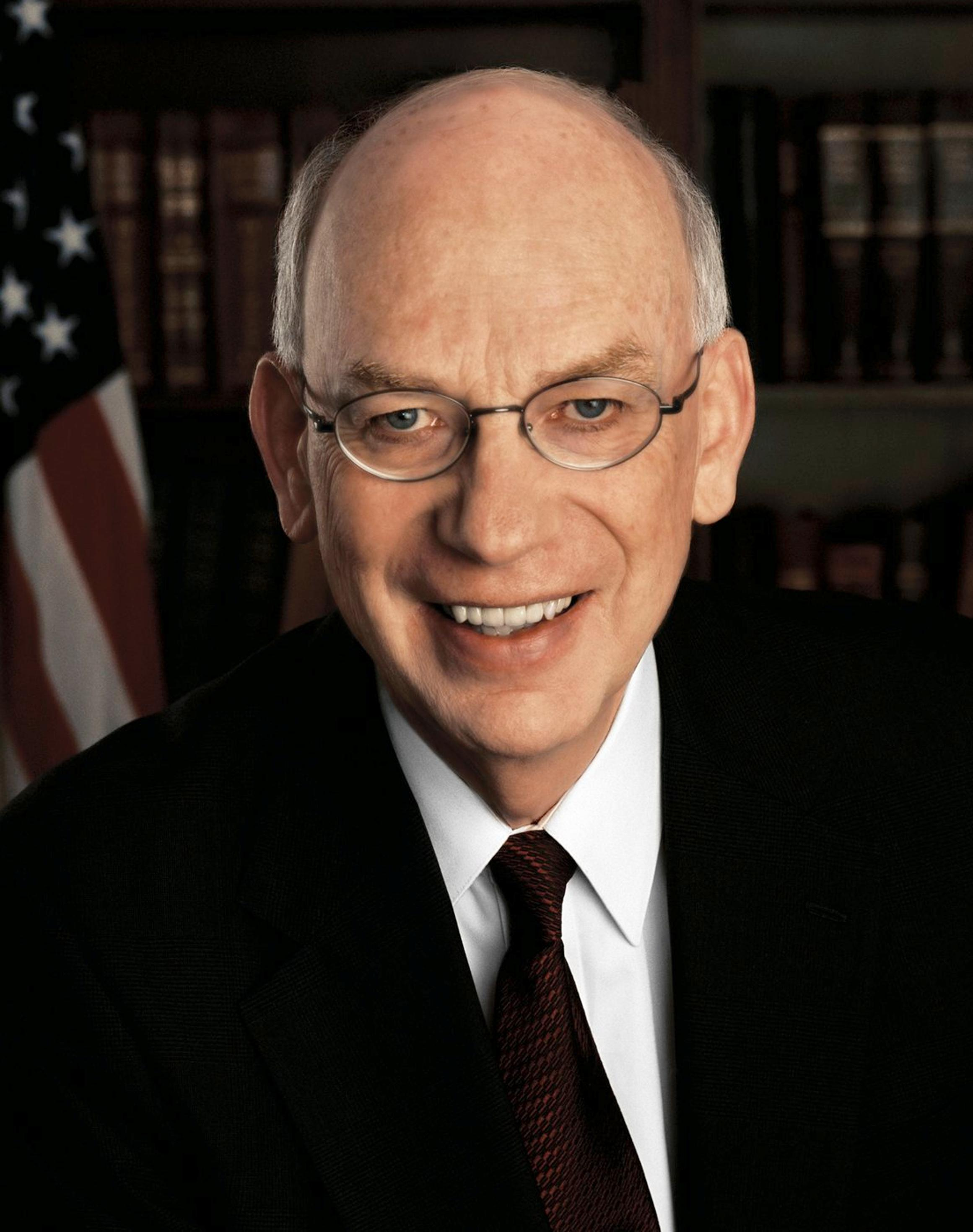

Nominee	Bob Bennett	Scott Leckman
Party	Republican	Democratic
Popular vote	316,652	177,459
Percentage	63.98%	32.97%
- County results Bennett: 50–60% 60–70% 70–80% 80–90% Leckman: 50–60%
U.S. senator before election
Bob Bennett
Republican
Elected U.S. Senator
Bob Bennett
Republican

The 1998 United States Senate election in Utah was held November 3, 1998. Incumbent Republican U.S. Senator Bob Bennett won re-election to a second term.

== Major candidates ==
=== Democratic ===
- Scott Leckman, physician

=== Republican ===
- Bob Bennett, incumbent U.S. Senator

== Results ==
General election results
Party	Candidate	Votes	%	±%
Republican	Bob Bennett (Incumbent)	316,652	63.98%	+8.60%
Democratic	Scott Leckman	163,172	32.97%	−6.74%
Independent American	Gary Van Horn	15,073	3.05%	
Write-ins		12	0.00%	
Majority		153,480	31.01%	+15.34%
Turnout		494,909		
Republican hold		Swing		

== See also ==
- 1998 United States Senate elections
