= 2022 Utah elections =

A general election was held on Tuesday, November 8, 2022, to elect candidates throughout Utah, as part of the 2022 midterm elections. The results of the elections showed strong Republican Party outcomes, although some races were unusually competitive for the traditionally Republican state.

== United States House of Representatives ==
All of Utah's four house seats were up in the 2022 elections, and all were won by Republicans following redistricting.

== United States Senate ==
Evan McMullin, presidential candidate in 2016, ran as an independent, cutting a net 15 points into Lee's margin six years prior, leaving Lee with the lowest Republican vote for a Senate candidate since 1974.

2022 United States Senate election in Utah
Party	Candidate	Votes	%	±%
Republican	Mike Lee (incumbent)	571,974	53.15%	–15.00
Independent	Evan McMullin	459,958	42.74%	N/A
Libertarian	James Hansen	31,784	2.95%	N/A
Independent American	Tommy Williams	12,103	1.12%	–1.33
Write-in		242	0.02%	N/A
Total votes		1,076,061	100.0%	
Republican hold				

== State treasurer ==
Oaks 50–60% 60–70% 70–80% 80–90% 90–100%

Incumbent treasurer Marlo Oaks, who had been appointed by Governor Spencer Cox in 2021, held on to his seat with 74% of the vote.

2022 Utah State Treasurer election
Party	Candidate	Votes	%	±%
Republican	Marlo Oaks (incumbent)	726,482	74.11%	−0.46%
Libertarian	Joseph Geddes Buchman	97,171	9.91%	−4.98%
United Utah	Thomas Alan Horne	94,265	9.62%	+9.62%
Independent American	Warren T. Rogers	62,295	6.36%	−4.18%
Total votes		980,213	100.0%	
Republican hold				

== Ballot measures ==
=== Amendment A ===
Amendment A
- November 8, 2022
- Limits on Emergency Appropriations
No
70–80%
60–70%
50–60%

Constitutional Amendment A aimed to increase limits on emergency appropriations, but failed with the support of a mere 36% of the vote.

Amendment 1
Choice	Votes	%
For	356,882	36.33
Against	625,367	63.67
Total	982,249	100.00
