= United States Senate Appropriations Subcommittee on Energy and Water Development =

The U.S. Senate Appropriations Subcommittee on Energy and Water Development is one of twelve subcommittees of the U.S. Senate Committee on Appropriations. The United States Senate Committee on Appropriations has joint jurisdiction with the United States House Committee on Appropriations over all appropriations bills in the United States Congress. Each committee has 12 matching subcommittees, each of which is tasked with working on one of the twelve annual regular appropriations bills.

== Appropriations process ==
Traditionally, after a federal budget for the upcoming fiscal year has been passed, the appropriations subcommittees receive information about what the budget sets as their spending ceilings. This is called "302(b) allocations" after section 302(b) of the Congressional Budget Act of 1974. That amount is separated into smaller amounts for each of the twelve Subcommittees. The federal budget does not become law and is not signed by the President. Instead, it is guide for the House and the Senate in making appropriations and tax decisions. However, no budget is required and each chamber has procedures in place for what to do without one. The House and Senate now consider appropriations bills simultaneously, although originally the House went first. The House Committee on Appropriations usually reports the appropriations bills in May and June and the Senate in June. Any differences between appropriations bills passed by the House and the Senate are resolved in the fall.

== Appropriations bills ==
An appropriations bill is a bill that appropriates (gives to, sets aside for) money to specific federal government departments, agencies, and programs. The money provides funding for operations, personnel, equipment, and activities. Regular appropriations bills are passed annually, with the funding they provide covering one fiscal year. The fiscal year is the accounting period of the federal government, which runs from October 1 to September 30 of the following year.

There are three types of appropriations bills: regular appropriations bills, continuing resolutions, and supplemental appropriations bills. Regular appropriations bills are the twelve standard bills that cover the funding for the federal government for one fiscal year and that are supposed to be enacted into law by October 1. If Congress has not enacted the regular appropriations bills by the time, it can pass a continuing resolution, which continues the pre-existing appropriations at the same levels as the previous fiscal year (or with minor modifications) for a set amount of time. The third type of appropriations bills are supplemental appropriations bills, which add additional funding above and beyond what was originally appropriated at the beginning of the fiscal year. Supplemental appropriations bills can be used for things like disaster relief.

Appropriations bills are one part of a larger United States budget and spending process. They are preceded in that process by the president's budget proposal, congressional budget resolutions, and the 302(b) allocation. Article One of the United States Constitution, section 9, clause 7, states that "No money shall be drawn from the Treasury, but in Consequence of Appropriations made by Law..." This is what gives Congress the power to make these appropriations. The President, however, still has the power to veto appropriations bills.

== Jurisdiction ==
This subcommittee, as its name implies, is responsible for funding related to the Department of Energy and water development projects in the United States. It also oversees the Tennessee Valley Authority, the federal power marketing administrations, and non-defense nuclear power, including nuclear waste disposal and the Nuclear Regulatory Commission.

It is also responsible for the multibillion-dollar budget of the U.S. Army Corps of Engineers and the Interior Department's U.S. Bureau of Reclamation. The Corps of Engineers is the primary federal agency with responsibility over "waters of the United States" that plans, designs, builds, and operates water resources and other civil works projects, while the Bureau of Reclamation oversees federal dams, irrigation, and rural drinking water projects in the Western United States.

== Members, 119th Congress ==
Majority	Minority
John Kennedy, Louisiana, Chair; Mitch McConnell, Kentucky; Lisa Murkowski, Alaska; Lindsey Graham, South Carolina (until July 11, 2026); John Hoeven, North Dakota; Cindy Hyde-Smith, Mississippi; Bill Hagerty, Tennessee; Katie Britt, Alabama; Mike Rounds, South Dakota; Darline Graham, South Carolina (from July 22, 2026)	Patty Murray, Washington, Ranking Member; Dick Durbin, Illinois; Jeff Merkley, Oregon; Chris Coons, Delaware; Tammy Baldwin, Wisconsin; Martin Heinrich, New Mexico; Gary Peters, Michigan; Jon Ossoff, Georgia
Ex officio
Susan Collins, Maine	

== Historical membership ==
=== 116th Congress ===
Majority	Minority
Lamar Alexander, Tennessee, Chairman; Mitch McConnell, Kentucky; Richard Shelby, Alabama; Susan Collins, Maine; Lisa Murkowski, Alaska; Lindsey Graham, South Carolina; John Hoeven, North Dakota; John Neely Kennedy, Louisiana; Cindy Hyde-Smith, Mississippi	Dianne Feinstein, California, Ranking Member; Patty Murray, Washington; Jon Tester, Montana; Dick Durbin, Illinois; Tom Udall, New Mexico; Jeanne Shaheen, New Hampshire; Jeff Merkley, Oregon; Chris Coons, Delaware
Ex officio
	Patrick Leahy, Vermont

=== 117th Congress ===
Majority	Minority
Dianne Feinstein, California, Chair; Patty Murray, Washington; Jon Tester, Montana; Dick Durbin, Illinois; Jeanne Shaheen, New Hampshire; Jeff Merkley, Oregon; Chris Coons, Delaware; Tammy Baldwin, Wisconsin; Martin Heinrich, New Mexico	John Kennedy, Louisiana, Ranking member; Mitch McConnell, Kentucky; Richard Shelby, Alabama; Susan Collins, Maine; Lisa Murkowski, Alaska; Lindsey Graham, South Carolina; John Hoeven, North Dakota; Cindy Hyde-Smith, Mississippi; Bill Hagerty, Tennessee
Ex officio
Patrick Leahy, Vermont	

=== 118th Congress ===
Majority	Minority
Dianne Feinstein, California, Chair (until September 29, 2023); Patty Murray, Washington, Interim Chair (from September 29, 2023); Jon Tester, Montana; Dick Durbin, Illinois; Jeanne Shaheen, New Hampshire; Jeff Merkley, Oregon; Chris Coons, Delaware; Tammy Baldwin, Wisconsin; Martin Heinrich, New Mexico; Kyrsten Sinema, Arizona (from October 17, 2023)	John Kennedy, Louisiana, Ranking member; Mitch McConnell, Kentucky; Lisa Murkowski, Alaska; Lindsey Graham, South Carolina; John Hoeven, North Dakota; Cindy Hyde-Smith, Mississippi; Bill Hagerty, Tennessee; Katie Britt, Alabama
Ex officio
	Susan Collins, Maine

== See also ==
- United States House Appropriations Subcommittee on Energy and Water Development
