= 1992 United States Senate election in Utah =

- November 3, 1992
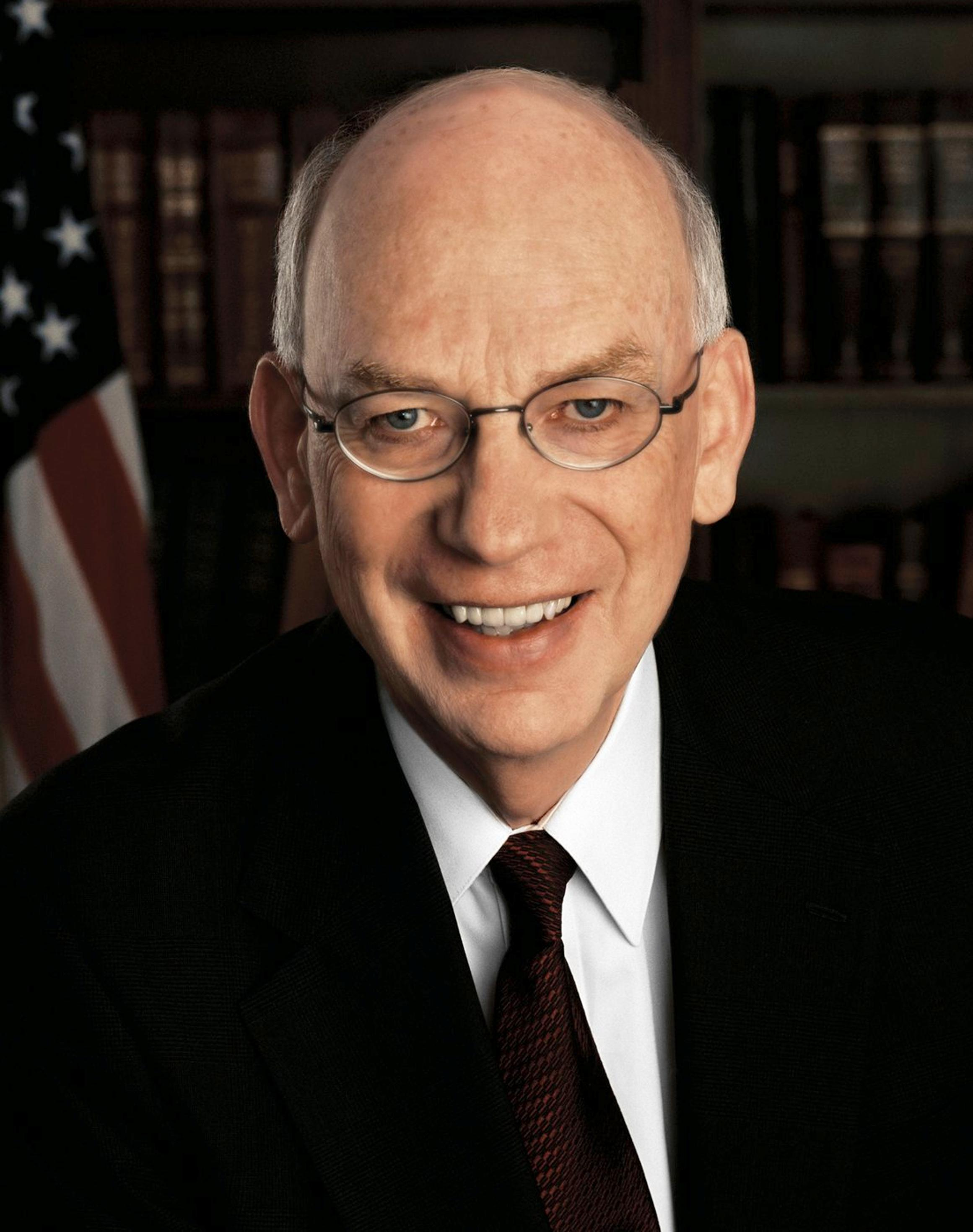

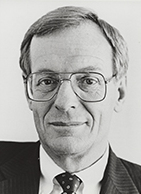
Nominee	Bob Bennett	Wayne Owens
Party	Republican	Democratic
Popular vote	420,069	301,228
Percentage	55.38%	39.72%
- County results Bennett: 40–50% 50–60% 60–70% 70–80% 80–90% Owens: 40–50% 50–60%
U.S. senator before election
Jake Garn
Republican
Elected U.S. Senator
Bob Bennett
Republican

The 1992 United States Senate election in Utah was held on November 3, 1992. Incumbent Republican U.S. Senator Jake Garn decided to retire instead of seeking a fourth term. Republican Bob Bennett won the open seat.

== Major candidates ==
=== Democratic ===
- Wayne Owens, U.S Representative

=== Republican ===
- Bob Bennett, CEO of FranklinCovey and son of former U.S. Senator Wallace F. Bennett
- Joseph A. Cannon
- Ted Stewart

== Other candidates ==
=== Populist ===
- Anita Morrow

=== Libertarian ===
- Maury Modine

=== Socialist Workers ===
- Patricia Grogan

== Results ==
General election results
Party	Candidate	Votes	%
Republican	Bob Bennett	420,069	55.38%
Democratic	Wayne Owens	301,228	39.72%
Populist	Anita Morrow	17,549	2.31%
Libertarian	Maury Modine	14,341	1.89%
Socialist Workers	Patricia Grogan	5,292	0.7%
Republican hold			

== See also ==
- 1992 United States Senate elections
