= Mike Lee =

American lawyer and politician (born 1971)

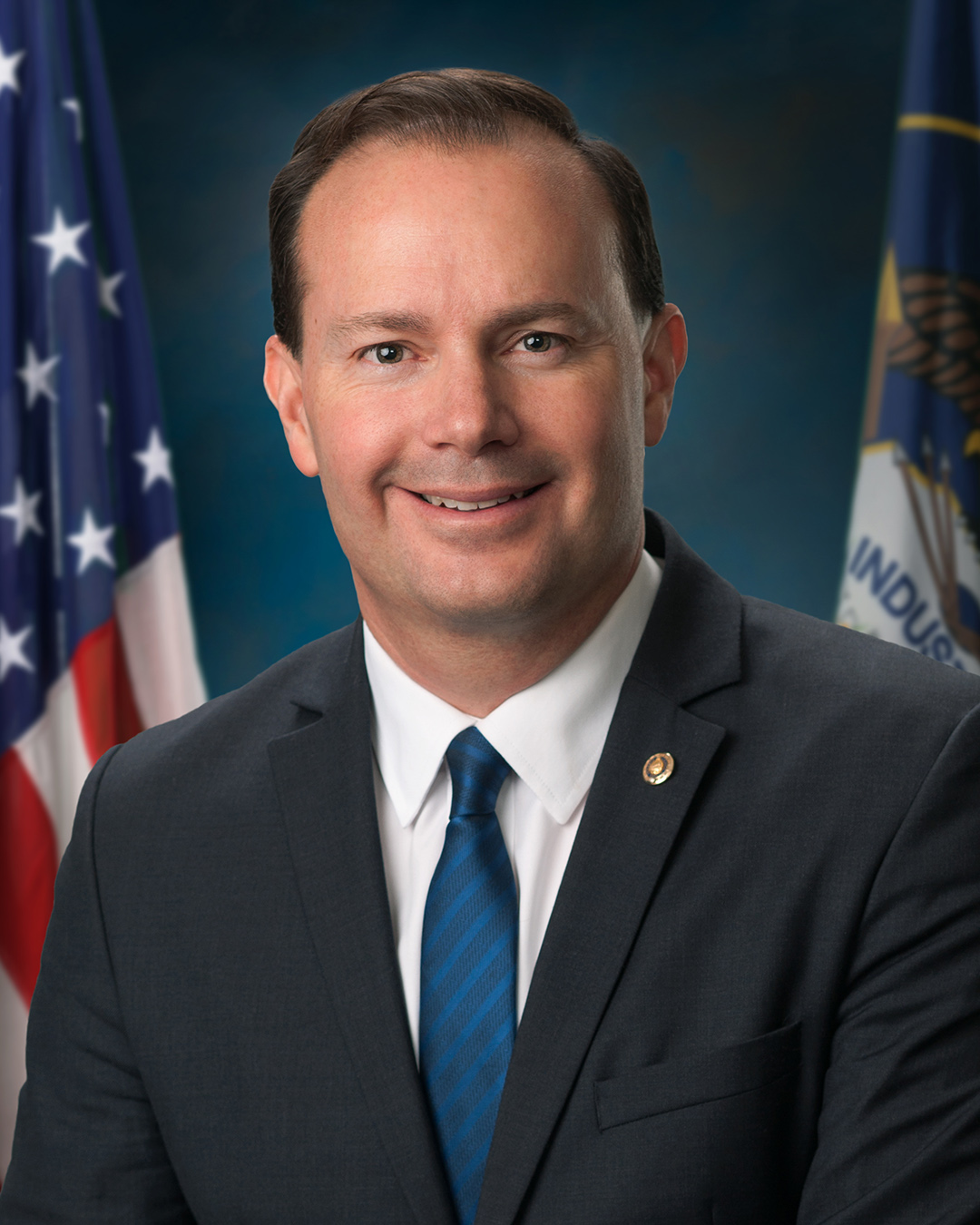
- Official portrait, 2017

Chair of the Senate Energy Committee
- Incumbent
- Assumed office January 3, 2025
- Preceded by: Joe Manchin

United States Senator from Utah
- Incumbent
- Assumed office January 3, 2011 Serving with John Curtis
- Preceded by: Bob Bennett
Senate positions
Chair of the Joint Economic Committee
In office January 3, 2019 – February 3, 2021
Preceded by	Erik Paulsen
Succeeded by	Don Beyer

Personal details
- Born: Michael Shumway Lee; June 4, 1971 (age 55) Mesa, Arizona, U.S.
- Party: Republican
- Spouse: Sharon Burr (m. 1993)
- Children: 3
- Parent: Rex E. Lee (father)
- Relatives: Udall-Hunt-Lee family
- Education: Brigham Young University (BA, JD)
- Website: Senate website Campaign website
- Lee's voice Lee on Bryce Canyon National Park; Recorded June 8, 2023

Michael Shumway Lee (born June 4, 1971) is an American lawyer and politician serving as the senior United States senator from Utah, a seat he has held since 2011. A member of the Republican Party, Lee has been Utah's senior senator since 2019 and the dean of Utah's congressional delegation since 2021.

The son of U.S. Solicitor General Rex E. Lee and brother of Utah Supreme Court justice Thomas Rex Lee, Lee began his career as a clerk for the U.S. District Court for the District of Utah before clerking for Samuel Alito, who was then a judge on the Third Circuit Court of Appeals. From 2002 to 2005, Lee was an assistant U.S. attorney for the District of Utah. He joined the administration of Utah governor Jon Huntsman Jr., serving as the general counsel in the governor's office from 2005 to 2006. Lee again clerked for Alito after he was appointed to the U.S. Supreme Court.

Lee was first elected to the Senate in 2010 after defeating incumbent senator Bob Bennett in the Republican primary. Although he refused to endorse Donald Trump during the 2016 Republican presidential primaries and voted for Evan McMullin in the general election, Lee eventually became a Trump ally. He endorsed Trump in 2020 and 2024, and supported the Trump administration's efforts to overturn the 2020 presidential election, though he did not sign the Texas v. Pennsylvania amicus brief and ultimately voted to certify the outcome.

Lee has been reelected twice, in 2016 and 2022, the latter victory over McMullin. Lee also chaired the Joint Economic Committee from 2019 to 2021.

== Early life and education ==
Lee was born in Mesa, Arizona on June 4, 1971, the son of Janet (née Griffin) and Rex E. Lee, who was solicitor general under President Ronald Reagan. Lee's older brother, Thomas Rex Lee, is a former justice of the Utah Supreme Court.

Lee's family moved to Provo, Utah, one year later, when his father became the founding dean of Brigham Young University's J. Reuben Clark Law School. While Lee spent about half of his childhood years in Utah, he spent the other half in McLean, Virginia, a suburb of Washington, D.C. His father served first as the assistant U.S. attorney general for the civil division of the U.S. Department of Justice from 1975 to 1976, and then as the solicitor general of the United States from 1981 to 1985. Lee is of English, Swiss, and Danish descent.

After graduating from Timpview High School in 1989, Lee attended Brigham Young University. He was elected president of the students' association, BYUSA, (Note: comparable to student body president in most colleges) while his father was president of the university. He graduated in 1994 with a bachelor of arts in political science. Lee then attended BYU's J. Reuben Clark Law School, where he was a member of the BYU Law Review and graduated with a Juris Doctor in 1997.

== Legal career ==
After law school, Lee clerked for Judge Dee Benson of the U.S. District Court for the District of Utah from 1997 to 1998, then for Judge (later Supreme Court Justice) Samuel Alito of the U.S. Court of Appeals for the Third Circuit from 1998 to 1999. Lee then entered private practice at the Washington, D.C., office of the law firm Sidley Austin, specializing in appellate and Supreme Court litigation. In 2002, Lee left Sidley and returned to Utah to serve as an assistant U.S. attorney in Salt Lake City, preparing briefs and arguing cases before the U.S. Court of Appeals for the Tenth Circuit. He served as general counsel to Utah Governor Jon M. Huntsman Jr. from 2005 to 2006. From 2006 to 2007, Lee again clerked for Alito, who had recently been appointed to the U.S. Supreme Court. Afterward, Lee returned to private practice in Utah, joining the Salt Lake City office of the law firm Howrey LLP.

As an attorney, Lee also represented Class A low-level radioactive waste facility provider EnergySolutions Inc. in a highly publicized dispute between the company and the Utah public and public officials that caused controversy during his first Senate election. Utah's government had allowed the company to store radioactive waste in Utah as long as it was low-grade "Class A" material. When the company arranged to store waste from Italy, many objected that the waste was foreign and could be more radioactive than permitted. Lee argued that the Commerce Clause of the U.S. Constitution allowed the company to accept foreign waste and that the waste could be reduced in grade by mixing it with lower-grade materials, while the state government sought to ban the importation of foreign waste using a radioactive waste interstate compact. EnergySolutions eventually abandoned its plans to store Italian radioactive waste in Utah, ending the dispute, with the 10th U.S. Circuit Court later ruling that the compact had the power to block foreign radioactive waste from being stored in Utah.

== U.S. Senate ==
=== Elections ===
==== 2010 ====
Lee ran for the U.S. Senate in 2010. When campaigning, he focused on the size of the federal government. He said the U.S. Constitution needed to be amended to create a flat-tax system and impose term limits on members of Congress. Senators would be allowed up to two terms and representatives up to six terms under the proposal.

At the Republican State Convention, he received 982 votes (28.75%) on the first ballot, to Tim Bridgewater's 26.84% and incumbent U.S. senator Bob Bennett's 25.91%. Bridgewater won the second and third ballots to win the party endorsement. Both Bridgewater and Lee received enough support to have their names placed on the primary ballot.

In the June 22 primary election, Lee won the Republican nomination with 51% of the vote to Bridgewater's 49%.

Lee won the November 2 general election with 62% of the vote to Democratic nominee Sam Granato's 33% and Constitution Party nominee Scott Bradley's 6%.

==== 2016 ====
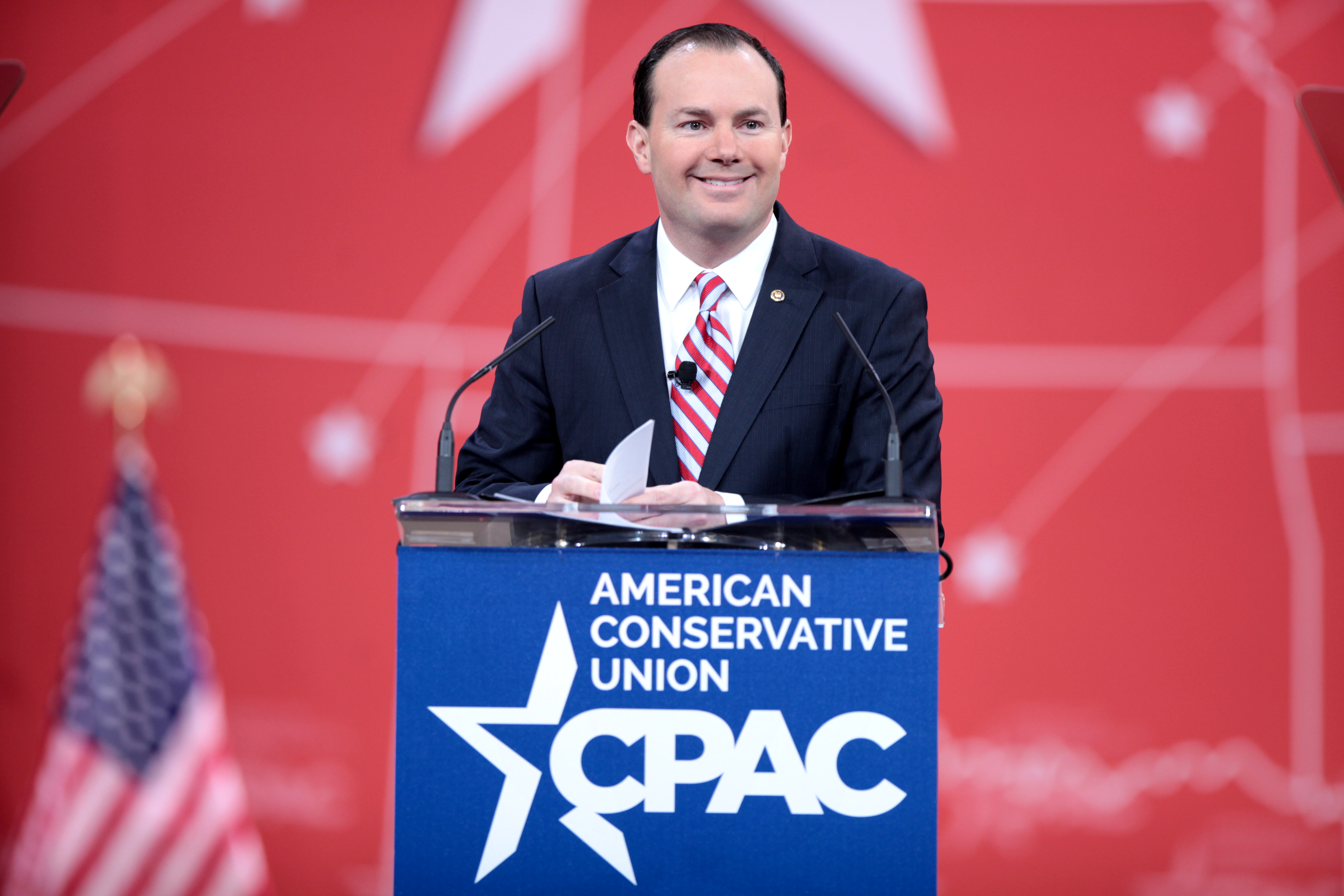
Mike Lee speaking at the 2015 Conservative Political Action Conference (CPAC) in National Harbor, Maryland on February 26, 2015

Lee was reelected in 2016. He was endorsed by the Club for Growth, the Senate Conservatives Fund, and the National Republican Senatorial Committee.

==== 2022 ====
Lee defeated Becky Edwards and Ally Isom in the Republican primary election. Isom criticized Lee for seeking a third term after he had supported legislation to limit senators to two terms.

In the general election, Lee was challenged by independent Evan McMullin, for whom Lee voted for president in 2016. The Utah Democratic Party backed McMullin instead of nominating a candidate. Polling in September showed Lee with 36% support and McMullin with 34%, with the rest undecided or choosing another candidate. According to Jason Perry, the director of the Hinckley Institute of Politics at the University of Utah, Utah had "not seen a Senate race this competitive in decades". Lee won the election 53% to 43%.

=== Tenure ===
==== Scorecards and rankings ====
In 2011, Club for Growth gave Lee a 100% score. He also received a 100% Conservative voting record for 2011 from the American Conservative Union. The Heritage Foundation gave him a 99% score, tied for first with Jim DeMint. He received a Liberal Action score of 38%.

==== 2016 presidential election ====
In March 2016, Lee endorsed Ted Cruz over Donald Trump in the 2016 Republican primary. He was the first senator to do so. At the time, he said, "I expect I'll be the first of many Republican senators who will endorse Ted Cruz. I'm confident more are on the way, and I welcome others to join." By June, after Trump had become the presumptive nominee, Lee had still not endorsed him, saying he needed "assurances" that Trump would not act as an "authoritarian" or "autocrat" and expressing frustration that Trump had "accused my best friend's father of conspiring to kill JFK"; at several points during the 2016 primary, Trump publicly implied that Ted Cruz's father Rafael had consorted with Lee Harvey Oswald to assassinate President John F. Kennedy. Lee voted for Independent Evan McMullin.

==== 2017 Alabama special election ====
On October 16, 2017, Lee endorsed Roy Moore in the 2017 Alabama special election runoff to fill the seat of U.S. Attorney General and former senator Jeff Sessions. Moore had been removed as the Alabama Supreme Court's chief justice in 2003 for defying a federal order to remove an illegal Ten Commandments monument from the Alabama Judicial Building. He was reelected chief justice in 2012. In May 2016, Moore was once again removed from the bench by the Alabama Judicial Inquiry Commission (JIC), permanently via suspension for the rest of his term, making him ineligible for reelection, for ordering state probate judges to ignore a U.S. Supreme Court decision. In a 50-page opinion, the Court of the Judiciary denied Moore's appeal of the JIC's decision, and said his removal was necessary "to preserve the integrity, independence, impartiality of Alabama's judiciary". Nevertheless, Lee praised Moore for his "reputation of integrity" and said he was essential to getting conservative legislation through the Senate. "That is why I am proudly endorsing Judge Roy Moore. Alabamians have the chance to send a proven, conservative fighter to the United States Senate." On November 9, 2017, Moore was accused of molesting a 14-year-old and other girls under age 18 when he was 32.

On November 10, Lee asked the Moore campaign to stop using Lee's endorsement of Moore in its ads. Lee's spokesperson said of the sexual misconduct allegations, "If these allegations are true, Judge Moore should resign." Later that day, Lee rescinded his endorsement of Moore.

==== 2020 presidential election ====
On October 28, 2020, Lee compared President Trump to Captain Moroni, a heroic figure in the Book of Mormon, telling rally-goers in Arizona: "To my Mormon friends, my Latter-Day Saint friends, think of him as Captain Moroni." He said that Trump "seeks not the praise of the world" and wants only "the well-being and peace of the American people". His comparison was met with backlash. The overwhelming majority of responses on Lee's Facebook account characterized his efforts as "shameful" or "blasphemous". In a follow-up Facebook post, Lee wrote that he had praised Trump for his willingness to "threaten the established political order", but that the comparison was "perhaps awkward" and that his "impromptu comments may not have been the best forum for drawing a novel analogy from scripture".

Text messages gathered by the January 6 Committee reveal Lee's close coordination with White House Chief of Staff Mark Meadows in the aftermath of Trump's defeat in the 2020 election. In the weeks after the election, Lee pursued a series of strategies to overturn the election results, claiming to have been working "14 hours a day" to find a path he could "persuasively defend". The strategies included attempts to persuade state legislatures in states Joe Biden won to put forward alternative slates of electors and promoting the efforts of attorneys Sidney Powell and John Eastman, arguing that "everything changes, of course, if the swing states submit competing slates of electors pursuant to state law." Ultimately, Lee became concerned by what he considered Powell's missteps, the lack of evidence given by her and others of election fraud, state legislatures' failure to convene alternate slates of electors, and what Lee considered the unconstitutional efforts of Senators Ted Cruz and Josh Hawley to challenge the election certification in Congress on January 6.

Lee ultimately voted to certify the election, saying that the effort to block the certification "could all backfire badly", but he continued to promulgate disinformation, claiming the FBI was involved in the January 6 attack on the Capitol. To date, only one FBI agent, Brett Gloss, has been identified as having entered a restricted area of the Capitol grounds.

After Biden won the 2020 presidential election, Trump refused to concede, and a pro-Trump mob stormed the U.S. Capitol, Lee said Trump should be given a "mulligan" for his inflammatory January 6 speech immediately before the storming of the Capitol. Lee later defended his remarks, saying, "my reference to taking a 'mulligan' was not referring to Trump, but to Democratic politicians whose inflammatory comments had just been played for me on the air [on Fox News]. I used the term...to avoid needlessly inflaming partisan passions." On May 28, 2021, Lee voted against creating an independent commission to investigate the riot. By April 2022, the January 6 Committee had discovered and released over 100 emails between Lee, Congressman Chip Roy, and Meadows discussing their plans to overturn the election results.

==== 2025 Minnesota shootings ====
In response to the shooting of two Minnesota Democratic–Farmer–Labor Party lawmakers and their spouses on June 14, 2025, Lee wrote on his personal X account, "This is what happens When Marxists don't get their way" and "Nightmare on Waltz Street", apparently referring to Minnesota Governor Tim Walz, who was included on the shooter's list along with Senator Tina Smith. Reports indicated that the shooter had been a supporter of Trump and had targeted Democratic lawmakers. Minnesota senators Amy Klobuchar and Tina Smith criticized Lee for his post. Both spoke to him, with Smith saying, "I wanted him to know how much pain that caused me and the other people in my state, and I think around the country, who think that this was a brutal attack". Lee later removed the posts after facing heavy criticism.

==== Social media ====
Lee is a prolific user of X, posting an average of 36 times daily in 2024 and an average of 100 times daily in the first four months of 2025. His account was temporarily suspended in 2023 for posts threatening the Prime Minister of Japan. Lee shared a video from Alex Jones's media company Infowars that claimed without evidence that the Biden administration planned to impose new COVID-19-related lockdowns in the fall of 2023. "Over my lifeless body", he wrote in response. In November 2023, Lee shared on X a post endorsing a debunked conspiracy theory that January 6 rioter Kevin Lyons was an undercover federal agent. Lee frequently interacted with Elon Musk on X, where he praised Musk's plans for a Department of Government Efficiency. In July 2025, Lee shared a fake resignation letter allegedly by Chairman of the Federal Reserve Jerome Powell. He deleted the post after being informed Powell was not resigning. In December 2025, Lee shared a post by antisemitic conspiracy theorist Ian Carroll endorsing the debunked Pizzagate conspiracy theory.

Following the assassination of Charlie Kirk, Lee suggested that the Kirk estate sue novelist Stephen King over a comment he made in the wake of the murder. Raw Story responded with an article titled 'Proof morons pass the bar': GOP senator mocked for lawsuit threat against Stephen King, which quoted legal bloggers who said that defamation suits by decedents' estates have been barred in the US and Britain for at least two centuries.

=== Committee assignments ===
Committee on the Judiciary

- Subcommittee on Administrative Oversight and the Courts
- Subcommittee on Antitrust, Competition Policy and Consumer Rights (Ranking Member)
- Subcommittee on the Constitution, Civil Rights and Human Rights

Committee on Energy and Natural Resources

- Subcommittee on Energy
- Subcommittee on Public Lands and Forests
- Subcommittee on Water and Power

Committee on Commerce, Science, and Transportation

- Subcommittee on Oceans, Atmosphere, Fisheries, and Coast Guard
- Subcommittee on Aviation Operations, Safety, and Security
- Subcommittee on Communications Technology, Innovation, and the Internet
- Subcommittee on Consumer Protection, Product Safety, Insurance and Data Security
- Subcommittee on Space, Science, and Competitiveness

Special Committee on Aging (2021–present)

Joint Economic Committee

Previous committee assignments

- Committee on Foreign Relations (2011–2013)
- Committee on Armed Services (2013–2017)

== Political positions ==
Lee is a conservative Republican. A study by Brigham Young University political science professor Michael Barber found Lee to be the "most ideologically extreme senator in the 113th Congress". The New York Times used the NOMINATE system to rank Senate members by ideology; Lee ranked as the Senate's most conservative member. GovTrack's 2017 analysis placed Lee on the right end of the spectrum, to the right of most Republicans, but to the left of a handful of Republican senators. FiveThirtyEight, which tracks congressional votes, found that Lee voted with Trump's positions on legislation 81.3% of the time as of July 2018.

=== 9/11 Responders Compensation Fund ===
On July 17, 2019, Jon Stewart and disabled construction worker John Feal criticized Lee and Rand Paul on Fox News for blocking a bill that provided Victims Compensation Fund support for disabled 9/11 responders. The fund was near exhaustion. On the Senate floor, Paul objected to Senator Kirsten Gillibrand's request for the bill to be approved by unanimous consent; per Senate rules, such a request is rejected if any senator objects. Lee had placed such a hold on the measure, despite its 73 Senate co-sponsors.

Stewart and Feal, as well as leaders of the Fraternal Order of Police and the International Association of Firefighters, tried to get both senators to withdraw their objections. "The people from the state of Kentucky and the people from the state of Utah deserve better", Feal said. Stewart said, "We have to stand up for the people who have always stood up for us, and maybe cannot stand up for themselves due to their illnesses and their injuries. ... There [are] some things that they have no trouble putting on the credit card, but somehow when it comes to the 9/11 first responder community, the cops, the firefighters, the construction workers, the volunteers, the survivors, all of a sudden ... we gotta go through this." On July 23, 2019, Lee was one of two senators to vote against the 9/11 Victim Compensation Fund.

=== Criminal justice reform ===
In 2013, Lee, Dick Durbin, and Patrick Leahy proposed a bill aiming "to focus limited federal resources on the most serious offenders". The bill would reduce some minimum sentences for drug-related offenses by half.

In November 2018, Lee criticized Senator Tom Cotton for his stance on the proposed First Step Act, a criminal justice reform bill Lee supported. Cotton had said that the legislation "gives early release to 'low level, nonviolent' criminals like those convicted of assaulting police, even with deadly weapons". Lee responded that "the First Step Act does not 'give early release' to anyone. Anyone claiming it does, does not understand how the bill works." The bipartisan bill, drafted by Chuck Grassley, Lee, and Durbin, passed the House of Representatives overwhelmingly, 360–59. The bill intends to improve rehabilitation programs for former prisoners and to give judges more "wiggle room" when sentencing nonviolent crime offenders. The bill eventually passed the Senate and became law.

=== District of Columbia Home Rule ===
In February 2025, Lee and Representative Andy Ogles introduced the BOWSER Act to repeal the District of Columbia Home Rule Act.

=== Democracy and election reform ===
In September 2020, during a Senate hearing, Lee took out and waved a pocket-sized Constitution published by the National Center for Constitutional Studies, a Mormon anti-government group founded by conspiracy theorist W. Cleon Skousen.

In October 2020, Lee sent a series of tweets declaring that the United States is "not a democracy" and that "democracy isn't the objective; liberty, peace, and prospefity [sic] are. We want the human condition to flourish. Rank democracy can thwart that." After provoking controversy, Lee continued to argue that the United States is more properly characterized as a constitutional republic.

In March 2021, Lee said on Fox News that the For the People Act was "rotten to the core" and was "as if written in Hell by the devil himself". The act attempts to expand voting rights, change campaign finance laws to reduce the influence of money in politics, limit partisan gerrymandering, and create new ethics rules for federal officeholders. It has been criticized by conservatives, including Lee, who believe its provisions improperly take power over elections away from state governments and give it to the federal government.

=== Economy ===
Lee has worked with Senator Amy Klobuchar to use antitrust laws against large technology companies like Facebook, Apple, and Amazon. Klobuchar said of collaborating with Lee:

We do find common ground on questions of policy, working out deals and contingencies we want to have. We get along quite well.

Lee was among the 31 Senate Republicans who voted against final passage of the Fiscal Responsibility Act of 2023.

=== Environment ===
In 2017, Lee was one of 22 Republican senators to sign a letter to Trump urging him to withdraw the U.S. from the Paris Agreement. According to OpenSecrets, Lee has received campaign contributions from oil and gas interests amounting to $231,520 and from coal interests in the amount of $21,895, for a total of $253,415 since 2012. At a May 2016 event, Lee rejected the scientific consensus on climate change, calling it "little more than a cheap public-relations ploy" by the Democratic Party. Lee opposes a carbon tax to deal with climate change.

In 2018, Lee defended Jim Bridenstine's nomination to head NASA. Bridenstine's nomination was contentious, given that he rejected the scientific consensus on climate change and had no background in science. In defending Bridenstine, Lee falsely claimed that NASA disputed that there was a scientific consensus on climate change. Since his confirmation, Bridenstine has said that he agrees with the scientific consensus on human contributions to climate change.

On March 26, 2019, the Senate opened debate on the Green New Deal. When Lee took the floor, he called the plan absurd, comparing it to an image of Ronald Reagan riding a velociraptor, and argued that having more babies was the real solution. He also said that "the authors of the Green New Deal proposal are trying to suggest people should not have babies and I think that's atrocious". According to Deseret News, "The text of the resolution does not address population growth or suggest limiting the number of children people can have."

==== Flint water crisis ====
In 2016, Lee used a procedural hold to block a vote on federal assistance for the Flint, Michigan water crisis. He was initially part of a group of senators blocking $220 million in aid to repair lead-contaminated pipes but, due to public pressure on others, Lee eventually became the last opposing senator. While initially anonymous, multiple sources leaked Lee's opposition to the media.

=== Foreign policy ===
As part of the Senate Foreign Relations Committee in 2018, Lee, Bernie Sanders, and Chris Murphy co-sponsored a resolution "that would end U.S. military support for the Saudi-led campaign in Yemen's civil war". Interviewed by The Hill, he said: "regardless of what may have happened with Mr. Khashoggi [referring to the assassination of Jamal Khashoggi], we are fighting a war in Yemen that we haven't declared, that has never been declared or authorized by Congress. That's not constitutional." The Senate voted 60–39 to "formally begin debate on the resolution", which would require the President to "withdraw troops in or 'affecting' Yemen within 30 days unless they are fighting al Qaeda".

In April 2018, Lee was one of eight Republican senators to sign a letter to Treasury Secretary Steve Mnuchin and acting Secretary of State John Sullivan expressing "deep concern" over a United Nations report exposing "North Korean sanctions evasion involving Russia and China" and asserting that the findings "demonstrate an elaborate and alarming military-venture between rogue, tyrannical states to avoid United States and international sanctions and inflict terror and death upon thousands of innocent people" while calling it "imperative that the United States provides a swift and appropriate response to the continued use of chemical weapons used by President Assad and his forces, and works to address the shortcomings in sanctions enforcement". He criticized Trump for ordering the 2018 missile strikes against Syria in response to the Douma chemical attack, saying he lacked the constitutional authority to do so without Congress's permission because the U.S. was not in imminent danger. Lee supported Trump's decision to withdraw U.S. troops from Syria in December 2018, saying they should not have been in the country without congressional authorization. He said the Obama administration had not made clear U.S. objectives in Syria regarding Assad's future, and that he believed Trump's claim that the Islamic State had been defeated.

Lee has long been in favor of ending American involvement in Afghanistan. He signed a letter in 2011 urging President Barack Obama to withdraw troops from the country. In May 2017, he called into question a proposal from military leaders to send additional troops there, calling to mind previous times when more soldiers were sent to the country but which, according to Lee, failed to make a significant difference. Lee maintained that American involvement in the war has wasted thousands of lives and trillions of dollars. In April 2021, President Joe Biden announced plans to withdraw all remaining US troops from Afghanistan by September 11 of that year. At a virtual meeting later that month, Lee stated his support of Biden's plan.

In April 2019, after the House passed the resolution withdrawing American support for the Saudi-led coalition in Yemen, Lee was one of nine lawmakers to sign a letter to Trump requesting a meeting with him and urging him to sign "Senate Joint Resolution 7, which invokes the War Powers Act of 1973 to end unauthorized US military participation in the Saudi-led coalition's armed conflict against Yemen's Houthi forces, initiated in 2015 by the Obama administration." The group of senators included Bernie Sanders, Rand Paul, and others. Trump was expected to veto the measure.

In June 2019, Lee was one of seven Republicans who voted to block Trump's Saudi arms deal, providing weapons to Saudi Arabia, the United Arab Emirates, and Jordan.

In September 2019, Lee stirred up controversy by refusing to cancel his trip to Russia after other members of the delegation had their visas denied. He insisted solo talks with Russian officials would ensure dialogue remained open between the two nations. Lee has been considered a strong supporter of Israel.

Lee has been a vocal critic of Japan's handling of the conviction and imprisonment of Lieutenant Ridge Alkonis, who was serving a three-year sentence in Japan for a May 2021 car crash that killed two Japanese citizens. In February 2023, Lee issued a 24-hour deadline on Twitter to Japanese Prime Minister Fumio Kishida to hand Alkonis over and threatened to cut off military aid to Japan over the incident. After the deadline passed, Lee took to the Senate floor to question the Status of Forces Agreement between the U.S. and Japan, which governs how military personnel stationed in Japan are treated under Japanese law. In March 2023, the Japanese Foreign Ministry lodged an official complaint against Lee through the U.S. government.

In December 2023, Lee introduced the Disengaging Entirely from the United Nations Debacle (DEFUND) Act, legislation to withdraw the U.S. from the United Nations.

In January 2024, Lee voted against a resolution proposed by Senator Bernie Sanders that would have applied the human rights provisions of the Foreign Assistance Act to U.S. military aid to Israel. The proposal was defeated, 72 to 11.

In January 2025, Lee called for U.S. withdrawal from the NATO alliance.

=== Healthcare ===
Lee was part of the group of 13 senators drafting the Senate version of the American Health Care Act of 2017 behind closed doors. He eventually came out against the bill, along with Senator Jerry Moran, bringing the "no" vote total among Republicans to four. This effectively stopped any chance of the bill's passage.

=== Immigration ===
In February 2019, Lee was one of 16 senators to vote against legislation preventing a partial government shutdown and containing $1.375 billion in funding for barriers along the U.S.-Mexico border that included 55 miles of fencing. In that same month, he reintroduced a bill to remove the per-country limitation on employment-based green cards and raised the per-country limitation on family-based green cards from 7% to 15%.

In March 2019, Lee was one of 12 Republican senators to vote to block Trump's national emergency declaration that would have granted him access to $3.6 billion in military construction funding to build border barriers.

=== LGBTQ rights ===
In 2015, Lee condemned the Supreme Court's decision in Obergefell v. Hodges, which held that same-sex marriage bans violated the Constitution.

In 2018, Lee condemned the Inter-American Court of Human Rights, which is part of the Organization of American States (OAS), for recommending that Costa Rica legalize same-sex marriage. The court's decision was spurred by a petition by Costa Rican President Luis Guillermo Solís, who was working on ways to improve LGBTQ rights in Costa Rica. Lee suggested that the United States, a primary funder of the OAS, should use its money more wisely and do more to safeguard religious liberties worldwide.

In May 2019, Lee called the Equality Act "counterproductive" and argued it "unnecessarily pits communities against each other".

On November 29, 2022, Lee voted against the Respect for Marriage Act, which requires the U.S. federal government to recognize the validity of same-sex and interracial marriages in the United States. Lee was the sole member of Utah's all-Republican congressional delegation to vote against the bill. (Note: Representative Burgess Owens of Utah's 4th congressional district was present bid did not vote on the amened Senate version of the bill.) A member of the Church of Jesus Christ of Latter-day Saints, Lee cast this vote despite his church's support for the legal guarantees of religious freedom found in the legislation.

=== National security ===
In February 2011, Lee was one of two Republicans to vote against extending the three provisions of the USA PATRIOT Act that deal with roving wiretaps, "lone wolf" terrorism suspects, and the government's ability to seize "any tangible items" in the course of surveillance. He voted in the same manner in May 2011.

=== Pornography ===
In 2022, Lee introduced the Interstate Obscenity Definition Act, which seeks to revise the legal definition of obscenity as established by the Communications Act of 1934 and the U.S. Supreme Court's 1973 Miller test in such a way as to criminalize pornography. He reintroduced the bill in 2024 and 2025. In February 2025, Lee introduced the SCREEN Act, which would require websites that contain any obscene content to require age verification.

=== Social Security ===
In April 2011, Lee and Senators Lindsey Graham and Rand Paul proposed a plan to reform the U.S. Social Security retirement payment system. Workers born after 1969 would have to wait until their 70th birthday to receive full Social Security benefits, rather than age 67 under current law. Furthermore, higher-income earners would receive smaller monthly checks under the plan.

In December 2020, Lee was the sole vote in the Senate against the ALS Disability Insurance Access Act of 2019, which eliminated the five-month waiting period for those with amyotrophic lateral sclerosis to receive Social Security benefits.

=== Spending ===
In September 2018, Lee was one of six senators, including Jeff Flake, Pat Toomey, Rand Paul, David Perdue, Ben Sasse, and Bernie Sanders, to vote against a $854 billion spending bill that would avert another government shutdown. The bill included funding for the departments of Defense, Health and Human Services, Labor, and Education.

In June 2025, Lee proposed the sale of substantial amounts of public lands as a fundraising measure to support the budget of the One Big Beautiful Bill Act. He suggested the effort was an attempt to better utilize the land, but western senators rejected the measure, which would have disproportionately affected their states, with large areas sold to private citizens or groups. Lee proposed other measures to sell public lands to private interests, but backed down in December 2025 after hunting and recreation advocates objected.

=== Supreme Court ===
In March 2019, Lee was one of 12 senators to cosponsor a resolution that would impose a constitutional amendment limiting the Supreme Court to nine justices. The resolution was introduced after multiple Democratic presidential candidates expressed openness to the idea of increasing the seats on the Supreme Court.

In March 2016, eight months before the 2016 election, Lee opposed considering Obama's Supreme Court nominee, Merrick Garland, during a presidential election year, citing "the contentious presidential election already well underway". But in September 2020, less than two months before the 2020 presidential election, Lee supported an immediate Senate vote to confirm Trump's nominee, Amy Coney Barrett.

=== Trade ===
In January 2018, Lee was one of 36 Republican senators to sign a letter to Trump requesting that he preserve the North American Free Trade Agreement (NAFTA) by modernizing it for the economy of the 21st century.

In November 2018, Lee was one of 12 Republican senators to sign a letter to Trump requesting the United States–Mexico–Canada Agreement (the replacement to NAFTA) be submitted to Congress by the end of that month to allow a vote on it before the end of the year as they were concerned "passage of the USMCA as negotiated will become significantly more difficult" if it had to be approved by the incoming 116th Congress.

=== Veterans ===
In 2022, Lee was among the 11 senators who voted against the Honoring our PACT Act of 2022, a bill that funded research and benefits for up to 3.5 million veterans exposed to toxic substances during their service.

== Personal life ==
Lee married Sharon Burr in 1993. They live in Alpine, Utah, and have three children. Lee is a second cousin to former Democratic U.S. senators Mark Udall of Colorado and Tom Udall of New Mexico, as well as former Republican senator Gordon H. Smith of Oregon.

As a young adult, Lee served a two-year mission for the Church of Jesus Christ of Latter-day Saints in the Texas Rio Grande Valley.

On October 2, 2020, Lee announced he had tested positive for COVID-19. A few days earlier, he had attended an event for Amy Coney Barrett at the White House where he interacted closely with a number of other people who tested positive for COVID-19. Lee did not wear a mask, and video footage showed him hugging others at the event.

Lee has served on the BYU alumni board, the BYU Law School alumni board, and as a longtime member of the J. Reuben Clark Law Society and the Federalist Society for Law and Public Policy Studies. He earned the Eagle Scout award from Boy Scouts of America in 1989 and was selected to receive the National Eagle Scout Association Outstanding Eagle Scout Award (NOESA) in 2011.

== Electoral history ==
2010

State Republican I Convention results, 2010
Candidate	First ballot	Pct.	Second ballot	Pct.	Third ballot	Pct.
Tim Bridgewater	917	26.84%	1274	37.42%	1854	57.28%
Mike Lee	982	28.75%	1225	35.99%	1383	42.72%
Bob Bennett	885	25.91%	905	26.99%	Eliminated	
Cherilyn Eagar	541	15.84%	Eliminated			
Merrill Cook	49	1.43%	Eliminated			
Leonard Fabiano	22	0.64%	Eliminated			
Jeremy Friedbaum	16	0.47%	Eliminated			
David Chiu	4	0.12%	Eliminated			
Total	3,416	100.00%	3,404	100.00%	3,237	100.00%

State Republican Primary results
Party	Candidate	Votes	%
Republican	Mike Lee	98,512	51.2%
Republican	Tim Bridgewater	93,905	48.8%
Total votes		192,417	100.0%

United States Senate election in Utah, 2010
Party	Candidate	Votes	%	±%
Republican	Mike Lee	390,179	61.56%	−7.18%
Democratic	Sam Granato	207,685	32.77%	+4.37%
Constitution	Scott Bradley	35,937	5.67%	+3.78%
Majority		182,494	28.79%	
Total votes		633,801	100.00%	
Republican hold		Swing		

2016

United States Senate election in Utah, 2016
Party	Candidate	Votes	%	±%
Republican	Mike Lee	760,241	68.15%	+6.59%
Democratic	Misty Snow	301,860	27.06%	−5.71%
Independent American	Stoney Fonua	27,340	2.45%	N/A
Unaffiliated	Bill Barron	26,167	2.34%	N/A
Majority		458,381		
Total votes		1,115,608	100.00%	
Republican hold		Swing		

2022

United States Senate election in Utah, 2022
Party	Candidate	Votes	%	±%
Republican	Mike Lee (incumbent)	571,974	53.15%	–15.00
Independent	Evan McMullin	459,958	42.74%	N/A
Libertarian	James Hansen	31,784	2.95%	N/A
Independent American	Tommy Williams	12,103	1.12%	–1.33
Write-in		242	0.02%	N/A
Total votes		1,076,061	100.00%	
Republican hold				

== Books ==
Since his election to the Senate in 2010, Lee has published six books:

- The Freedom Agenda: Why a Balanced Budget Amendment is Necessary to Restore Constitutional Government (July 2011, Regnery Publishing)
- Why John Roberts Was Wrong About Healthcare: A Conservative Critique of The Supreme Court's Obamacare Ruling (June 2013, Threshold Editions e-book)
- Our Lost Constitution: The Willful Subversion of America's Founding Document (April 2015, Sentinel)
- Written Out of History: The Forgotten Founders Who Fought Big Government (May 2017, Sentinel)
- Our Lost Declaration: America's Fight Against Tyranny from King George to the Deep State (April 2019, Sentinel)
- Saving Nine: The Fight Against the Left's Audacious Plan to Pack the Supreme Court and Destroy American Liberty (June 2022, Center Street)

== See also ==
- Donald Trump Supreme Court candidates
- Lee–Hamblin family
- List of law clerks for the eighth seat of the Supreme Court of the United States
- List of politicians affiliated with the Tea Party movement
- Utah Transfer of Public Lands Act

== Notes ==
Party political offices
Preceded by Bob Bennett	Republican nominee for U.S. Senator from Utah (Class 3); 2010, 2016, 2022	Most recent
Preceded by Pat Toomey	Chair of the Senate Republican Steering Committee; 2015–2025	Succeeded by Rick Scott
U.S. Senate
Preceded by Bob Bennett	U.S. Senator (Class 3) from Utah; 2011–present Served alongside: Orrin Hatch, Mitt Romney, John Curtis	Incumbent
Preceded by Erik Paulsen	Chair of the Joint Economic Committee; 2019–2021	Succeeded by Don Beyer
Preceded by Joe Manchin	Chair of the Senate Energy Committee; 2025–present	Incumbent
Honorary titles
Preceded by George LeMieux	Baby of the Senate; 2011–2012	Succeeded by Brian Schatz
U.S. order of precedence (ceremonial)
Preceded by John Hoeven	Order of precedence of the United States as United States Senator	Succeeded by Brian Schatz
Preceded by Richard Blumenthal	United States senators by seniority 32nd	Succeeded by Brian Schatz
