= 2010 United States Senate election in Utah =

- November 2, 2010
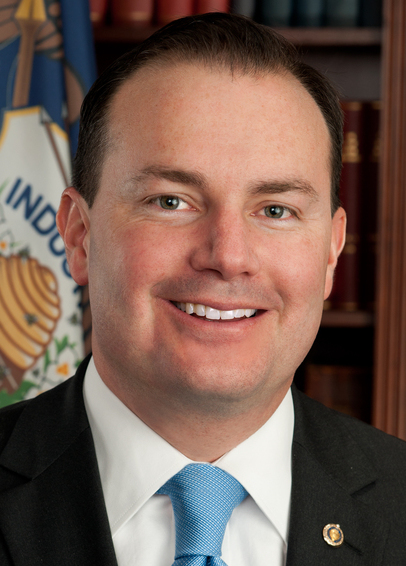

Nominee	Mike Lee	Sam Granato	Scott Bradley
Party	Republican	Democratic	Constitution
Popular vote	390,179	207,685	35,937
Percentage	61.56%	32.77%	5.67%
- County results Lee: 40–50% 50–60% 60–70% 70–80% 80–90% Granato: 50–60%
U.S. senator before election
Bob Bennett
Republican
Elected U.S. Senator
Mike Lee
Republican

The 2010 United States Senate election in Utah took place on November 2, 2010, along with other midterm elections throughout the United States. Incumbent Republican U.S. Senator Bob Bennett was seeking re-election to a fourth term, but lost renomination at the Republican Party's state convention. Mike Lee proceeded to win the Republican primary against Tim Bridgewater and the general election against Democrat Sam Granato. As of 2026, this is the most recent U.S. Senate election in which a political party held the seat after denying renomination to the incumbent senator.

== Process ==
The filing period for candidates began March 12, 2010 and ended March 19, 2010. Candidates who had not filed by that date cannot appear on the ballot in November. Eleven candidates filed with the Office of the Lieutenant Governor.

Both the Utah State Democratic Party and the Utah State Republican Party held statewide caucus meetings on March 23, 2010. Caucus meetings are grouped by legislative district and divided by precincts with each precinct electing delegates who attend their respective party's state nominating convention.

The Utah State Democratic and Republican Parties held their conventions on May 8, 2010. At the Republican convention, incumbent Senator Bob Bennett finished third in balloting among delegates and was eliminated from the race. Business owner Tim Bridgewater finished first and attorney Mike Lee finished second, but Bridgewater did not receive enough votes (he needed at least 60 percent) to avoid a primary election runoff against Lee. At the Democratic convention, delegates nominated businessman Sam Granato, who received 77.5 percent of the vote.

In the Republican primary election, held on June 22, 2010, Lee became the Republican nominee by winning 51 percent of the vote against Bridgewater's 49 percent.

The general election was held on November 2, 2010. Lee won the election with 62 percent of the vote to Granato's 33 percent and 6 percent for Constitution Party candidate Scott Bradley.

== Republican nomination ==
=== Convention ===
==== Candidates ====
On Ballot

- Bob Bennett, incumbent U.S. Senator
- Tim Bridgewater, businessman and candidate for UT-02 in 2002 and 2004
- David Chiu
- Merrill Cook, former U.S. Representative
- Cherilyn Eagar, businesswoman
- Leonard Fabiano
- Jeremy Friedbaum
- Mike Lee, attorney

Withdrew

- Mark Shurtleff State Attorney General

==== Endorsements ====
The following are endorsements made before the convention

Bennett

Notable Individuals and Organizations endorsing Bob Bennett
- U.S. Senator Orrin Hatch of Utah
- Former U.S. Senator Jake Garn of Utah
- Former Speaker of the House Newt Gingrich of Georgia
- Former Governor Mitt Romney of Massachusetts

Lee

State/local level positions (State Senators, Governors, etc.)
- Former Governor Norm Bangerter of Utah
- Attorney General Mark Shurtleff
- State Senator Curt Bramble
- State Senator Allen Christensen
- State Senator Mark Madsen
- State Representative John Dougall
- State Representative Craig Frank
- State Representative Francis Gibson
- State Representative Kerry Gibson
- State Representative Todd Kiser
- State Representative Mike Morley
- State Representative Curt Oda
- State Representative Ken Sumsion
- Former State Representative John Swallow
- State Representative Ryan Wilcox
- State Representative Carl Wimmer
Federal politicians and Organizations
- Former House Majority Leader Dick Armey of Texas
- Former U.S. Congressman James V. Hansen of Utah
- U.S. Congressman Ron Paul of Texas
- Former U.S. Senator Rick Santorum of Pennsylvania
- U.S. Senator John McCain of Arizona
- Editor of conservative webblog RedState Erick Erickson
- Prominent conservative author and talk show host Mark Levin
- FreedomWorks PAC
- Most of the 9/12 and Tea Party Groups of Utah

==== Polling ====
Poll Source	Dates Administered	Bob Bennett	Tim Bridgewater	Merrill Cook	Cherilyn Eagar	Mike Lee
Rasmussen Reports	April 8, 2010	14%	14%	6%	4%	37%
Mason Dixon	April 22–25, 2010	16%	20%	1%	11%	37%

==== Results ====
State Republican Convention results, 2010
Candidate	First ballot	Pct.	Second ballot	Pct.	Third ballot	Pct.
Mike Lee	982	28.75%	1225	35.99%	1383	42.72%
Tim Bridgewater	917	26.84%	1274	37.42%	1854	57.28%
Bob Bennett	885	25.91%	905	26.99%	Eliminated	
Cherilyn Eagar	541	15.84%	Eliminated			
Merrill Cook	49	1.43%	Eliminated			
Leonard Fabiano	22	0.64%	Eliminated			
Jeremy Friedbaum	16	0.47%	Eliminated			
David Chiu	4	0.12%	Eliminated			
Total	3,416	100.00%	3,404	100.00%	3,237	100.00%

=== Primary ===
==== Candidates ====
- Tim Bridgewater, businessman
- Mike Lee, attorney

==== Endorsements ====
Bridgewater

Notable Individuals
- Incumbent U.S. Senator Bob Bennett
- Former chairman of RNC Dick Richards
- State Senator Howard A. Stephenson
- State Senator Jerry Stevenson
- State Senator David Hinkins
- State Representative Greg Hughes
- State Representative Lorie Fowlke
- State Representative Julie Fisher
- State Representative Merlynn Newbold
Utah Mayors
- Clearfield: Don Wood
- Coalville: Duane Schmidt
- Draper: Darrel Smith
- Fruit Heights: Todd Stevenson
- Farmington: Scott Harbertson
- Harrisville: Richard Hendrix
- Kaysville: Steve Hiatt
- Pleasant Grove: Bruce Call
- Pleasant View: Doug Clifford
- Provo: John Curtis
- Riverdale: J. Bruce Burrows
- Roy: Joe Ritchie
- Sandy: Tom Dolan
- Saratoga Springs: Mia Love
- St. George: Daniel McArthur
- South Weber: M. Jeffery Monroe
- Taylorsville: Russ Wall
- West Jordan: Melissa Johnson

Lee

Federal politicians and Organizations
- U.S. Senator Jim DeMint
- Former U.S. Senator Rick Santorum of Pennsylvania
- Former House Majority Leader Dick Armey of Texas
- Former U.S. Congressman James V. Hansen of Utah
- U.S. Congressman Ron Paul of Texas
- Editor of conservative weblog RedState Erick Erickson
- Prominent conservative author and talk show host Mark Levin
- FreedomWorks PAC
- Republican Liberty Caucus
State/local politicians and organizations
- Former governor Norm Bangerter of Utah
- Attorney General Mark Shurtleff
- State Senator Curt Bramble
- State Senator Allen Christensen
- State Senator Mark Madsen
- State Representative John Dougall
- State Representative Francis Gibson
- State Representative Kerry Gibson
- State Representative Craig Frank
- State Representative Ken Sumsion
- State Representative Todd Kiser
- State Representative Mike Morley
- State Representative Curt Oda
- State Representative Ryan Wilcox
- State Representative Carl Wimmer
- Former State Representative John Swallow
- Most of the 9/12 and Tea Party Groups of Utah

==== Polling ====
Poll Source	Dates Administered	Tim Bridgewater	Mike Lee
Wilson Research	June 10, 2010	30%	39%
Deseret News/KSL-TV	June 12–17, 2010	42%	33%

==== Results ====
Results by county: Lee—60–70% Lee—50–60% Bridgewater—50–60% Bridgewater—60–70%

State Republican Primary results
Party	Candidate	Votes	%
Republican	Mike Lee	98,512	51.2%
Republican	Tim Bridgewater	93,905	48.8%
Total votes		192,417	100.0%

== Democratic nomination ==
=== Candidates ===
- Sam Granato, businessman
- Christopher Stout, accountant

=== Results ===
State Democratic Convention results (first round)
Party	Candidate	Votes	%
Democratic	Sam Granato	77	77%
Democratic	Christopher Stout	23	23%
Total votes		100	100.0%

== General election ==
=== Candidates ===
- Scott Bradley (C), businessman
- Sam Granato (D), businessman
- Mike Lee (R), attorney

=== Campaign ===
Granato emphasized his opposition to nuclear weapon tests in neighboring Nevada. In addition, he criticized Lee for his support of raising the retirement age and for questioning the constitutionality of Social Security.

=== Predictions ===
Source	Ranking	As of
Cook Political Report	Solid R	October 26, 2010
Rothenberg	Safe R	October 22, 2010
RealClearPolitics	Safe R	October 26, 2010
Sabato's Crystal Ball	Safe R	October 21, 2010
CQ Politics	Safe R	October 26, 2010

=== Polling ===
Poll source	Date(s) administered	Sample size	Margin of error	Sam Granato (D)	Mike Lee (R)	Other	Undecided
Rasmussen Reports	June 23, 2010	500	± 4.5%	28%	58%	5%	9%
Rasmussen Reports	August 23, 2010	500	± 4.5%	29%	54%	5%	12%
Rasmussen Reports	October 13, 2010	500	± 4.5%	28%	61%	4%	8%
Deseret News/KSL-TV	October 11–14, 2010	600	± 4.0%	31%	53%	1%	11%
Mason-Dixon	October 27, 2010	625	± 4.0%	32%	48%	5%	15%
Deseret News/KSL-TV	October 25–28, 2010	1,206	± 3.0%	30%	57%	6%	7%

=== Fundraising ===
Candidate (Party)	Receipts	Disbursements	Cash On Hand	Debt
Mike Lee (R)	$1,595,383	$1,423,494	$165,314	$57,691
Sam Granato (D)	$250,607	$219,776	$30,831	$15,000
Source: Federal Election Commission

=== Results ===
United States Senate election in Utah, 2010
Party	Candidate	Votes	%	±%
Republican	Mike Lee	390,179	61.56%	−7.18%
Democratic	Sam Granato	207,685	32.77%	+4.37%
Constitution	Scott Bradley	35,937	5.67%	+3.78%
Majority		182,494	28.79%	
Total votes		633,801	100.00%	
Republican hold		Swing		

==== Counties that flipped from Republican to Democratic ====
- Summit (largest municipality: Park City)
