= 2004 United States Senate election in Utah =

- November 2, 2004
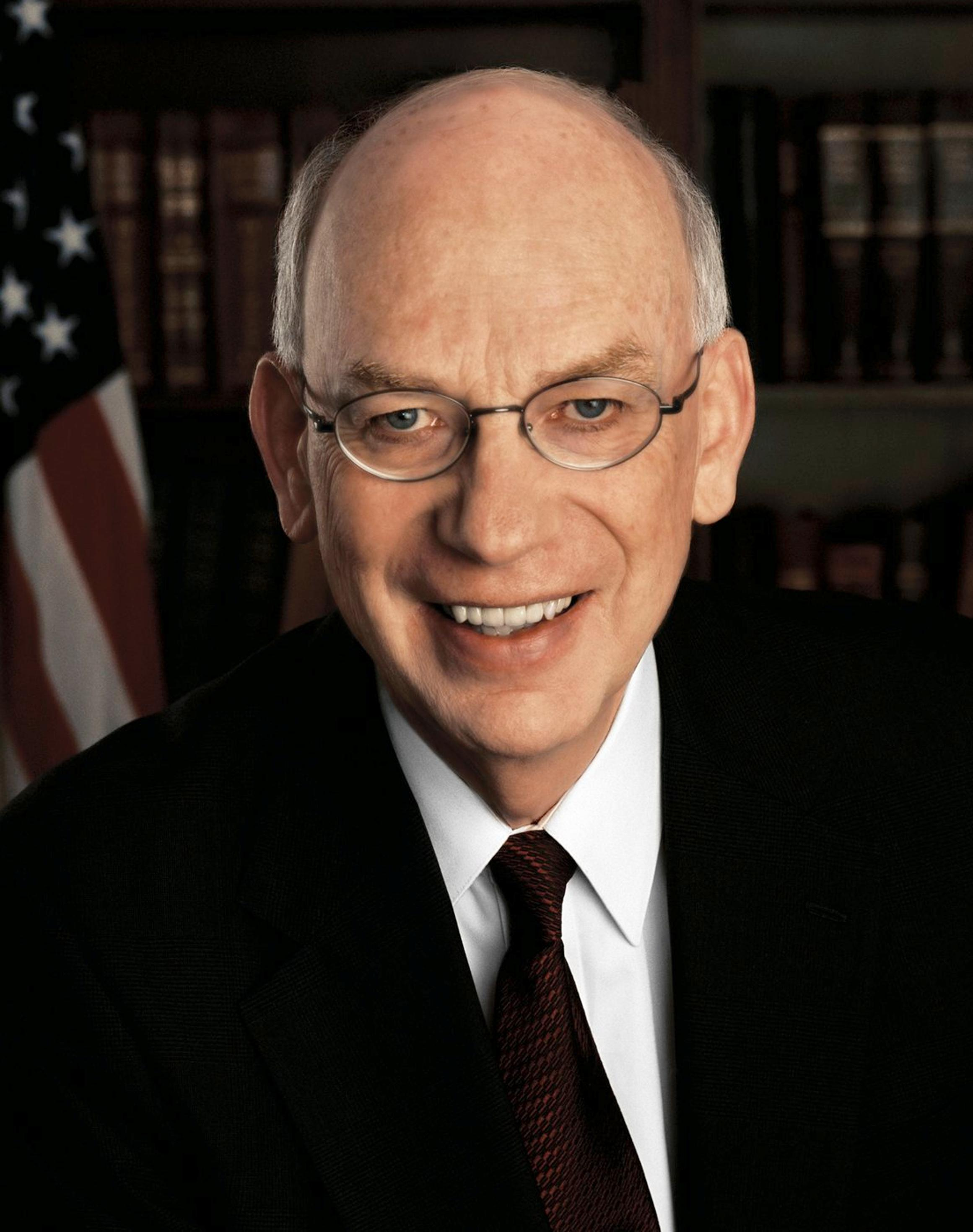

Nominee	Bob Bennett	Paul Van Dam
Party	Republican	Democratic
Popular vote	626,640	258,955
Percentage	68.73%	28.40%
- County results Bennett: 50–60% 60–70% 70–80% 80–90%
U.S. senator before election
Bob Bennett
Republican
Elected U.S. Senator
Bob Bennett
Republican

The 2004 United States Senate election in Utah was held on November 2, 2004. Incumbent Republican U.S. Senator Bob Bennett won re-election to a third term.

== Major candidates ==
=== Democratic ===
- Paul Van Dam, former Attorney General of Utah and former Salt Lake County District Attorney

==== Declined ====
- Ken Jennings, game show contestant

=== Republican ===
- Bob Bennett, incumbent U.S. Senator

== General election ==
=== Predictions ===
Source	Ranking	As of
Sabato's Crystal Ball	Safe R	November 1, 2004

=== Polling ===
Poll source	Date(s) administered	Sample size	Margin of error	Bob Bennett (R)	Paul Van Dam (D)	Gary Van Horn (C)	Undecided
Dan Jones & Associates	October 21–28, 2004	1228 (V)	± 3.3%	65%	22%	2%	11%
Valley Research	October 21–26, 2004	1200 (RV)	± 2.8%	61%	23%		16%
for Salt Lake Tribune	September 24–29, 2004	400 (LV)	± 4.9%	62%	19%		19%
Dan Jones & Associates	September 6–9, 2004	915 (V)	± 3.3%	60%	23%	1%	16%
Dan Jones & Associates	July 6–10, 2004	920 (RV)	± 3.5%	61%	24%		15%
Dan Jones & Associates	May 10–13, 2004	923 (V)	± 3.2%	64%	24%		12%
Dan Jones & Associates	March 17–20, 2004	612 (V)	± 4%	63%	16%	2%	19%

=== Results ===
General election results
Party	Candidate	Votes	%	±%
Republican	Bob Bennett (Incumbent)	626,640	68.73%	+4.75%
Democratic	Paul Van Dam	258,955	28.40%	−4.57%
Constitution	Gary R. Van Horn	17,289	1.90%	
Personal Choice	Joe LaBonte	8,824	0.97%	
Write-ins		18	0.00%	
Majority		367,685	40.33%	+9.32%
Turnout		911,726		
Republican hold		Swing		

==== Counties that flipped from Democratic to Republican ====
- Carbon (largest municipality: Price)

== See also ==
- 2004 United States Senate elections
