= Southwestern Power Administration =

Regional power administration of the U.S. Department of Energy

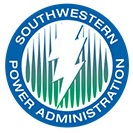

Agency overview
- Formed: September 1, 1943
- Jurisdiction: U.S. government
- Headquarters: Tulsa, Oklahoma, U.S.
- Agency executive: Mike Wech, Administrator
- Parent agency: U.S. Department of Energy
- Website: swpa.gov

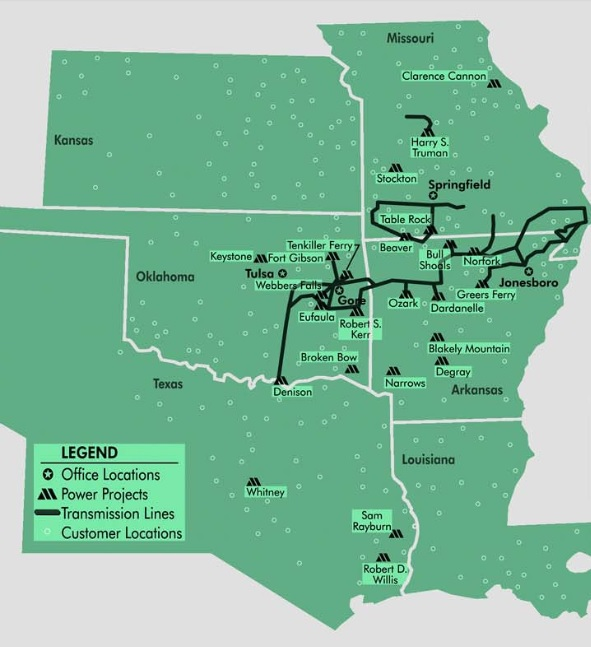
Map of the 24 dams and transmission lines of the Southwestern Power Administration.

The Southwestern Power Administration (Southwestern) is an agency of the U.S. Department of Energy. Southwestern's mission was established by Section 5 of the Flood Control Act of 1944. The agency is a power marketing administration responsible for marketing the hydroelectric power produced at 24 United States Army Corps of Engineers multipurpose dams. By law, the power and associated energy are marketed to publicly held entities such as rural electric cooperatives and municipal utilities. Southwestern has over one hundred such "preference" customers which ultimately serve over 10 million end use customers.

Southwestern operates and maintains 1,380 miles of high-voltage transmission lines, 24 substations, and 46 microwave and VHF radio sites from field offices. Around-the-clock power scheduling and dispatching is conducted from the Operations Center.

Southwestern's rates, by law, are designed to recover the costs of producing the power. These costs include repayment of the dams' initial construction, with interest; repayment of the transmission system construction, with interest; major replacements; and both the Corps of Engineers' and Southwestern's annual operating and maintenance expenses. Annual revenues vary with water conditions, but generally average about US$100 million. Southwestern returns the revenues to the U.S. Treasury, and of that, about US$40 million is applied toward interest and repayment of the Federal investment.

== History ==
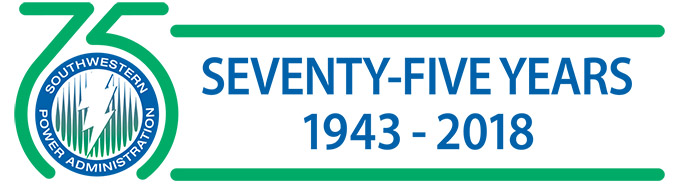
Logo used to commemorate 75 years of the Southwestern Power Administration

Speaker of the House Sam Rayburn of Texas and Representative Clyde T. Ellis of Arkansas spearheaded the effort to make all federal dams constructed by the U.S. Army Corps of Engineers in the region to stay owned and operated by the military while the hydroelectric power stations were to be managed and marketed by the new Southwestern Power Administration. In the late 1930s Rayburn and Ellis were able to secure dams in Denison, TX and Norfork, AR in separate independent projects for their House district constituents. The two representatives pushed for a 'mini-Tennessee Valley Authority' system for the states of Texas, Arkansas, Oklahoma, and Missouri (and a few more states who would be customers to these dams' energy production) but only for the federally built dams and their hydroelectric power plants. Other power plants like fossil fuel plants were not going to be owned and managed by the SWPA like Tennessee's power plants. The reason for the creation of the SWPA was the fear that the federal dams, which are multipurpose in terms of flood control and water storage for recreation and human use, would be poorly managed by private businesses and also because utility companies during the 1920s and 1930s hiked up electricity prices in rural areas far higher than in urban areas.

The SWPA was a hallmark of Rayburn's campaign to provide electricity to all farmers and rural Americans. He previously succeeded in the landmark Rural Electrification Act of 1936 to establish rural cooperatives to supply very cheap electricity to rural Americans. The SWPA (as well as the establishment of the other three Power Marketing Administrations) and the guaranteed cheap electricity from dams helped the REA's goals to be realized. Rayburn first persuaded President Roosevelt to sign an executive order establishing the SWPA in July 1943. This was crucial because private utility companies were hoping for the dams to be turned over to the Federal Works Administration during World War II. Most public projects that were turned over to the FWA were scheduled to end up in private companies' hands after the war. Executive orders are only temporary so Rayburn was able to get the SWPA to be permanently established in the Flood Control Act of 1944. This act also established the similar Southeastern Power Administration. From 1943 to 1984 twenty-four dams were built for the SWPA.

== List of dams ==
Name	Capacity (MW)	Year of completion	Location
Denison Dam	80	1943	Bryan County, OK / Grayson County, TX
Norfork Dam	80.4	1944	Mountain Home, Arkansas
Fort Gibson Dam	48	1949	Fort Gibson, Oklahoma
Bull Shoals Dam	380	1951	Bull Shoals, Arkansas
Narrows Dam	25.5	1951	Murfreesboro, Arkansas
Whitney Dam	43	1951	Whitney, Texas
Tenkiller Ferry Dam	34	1952	Gore, Oklahoma
Blakely Mountain Dam	75	1953	Hot Springs, Arkansas
Town Bluff Dam	8	1953	Jasper, Texas
Table Rock Dam	200	1958	Branson, Missouri
Greers Ferry Dam	96	1962	Heber Springs, Arkansas
Eufaula Dam	90	1964	Eufaula, Oklahoma
Sam Rayburn Dam	52	1965	Jasper, Texas
Beaver Dam	112	1966	Eureka Springs, Arkansas
Broken Bow Dam	100	1968	Broken Bow, Oklahoma
Keystone Dam	70	1968	Tulsa, Oklahoma
Stockton Dam	52	1969	Stockton, Missouri
Robert S. Kerr Dam	110	1970	Sallisaw, Oklahoma
Webbers Falls Dam	60	1970	Webbers Falls, Oklahoma
Dardanelle Dam	160.8	1971	Russellville, Arkansas
DeGray Dam	68	1972	Arkadelphia, Arkansas
Ozark-Jeta Taylor Lock and Dam	100	1974	Ozark, Arkansas
Harry S. Truman Dam	160	1979	Tom Township, Missouri
Clarence Cannon Dam	58	1984	Monroe City, Missouri

== Depictions of Southwestern Power Administration ==
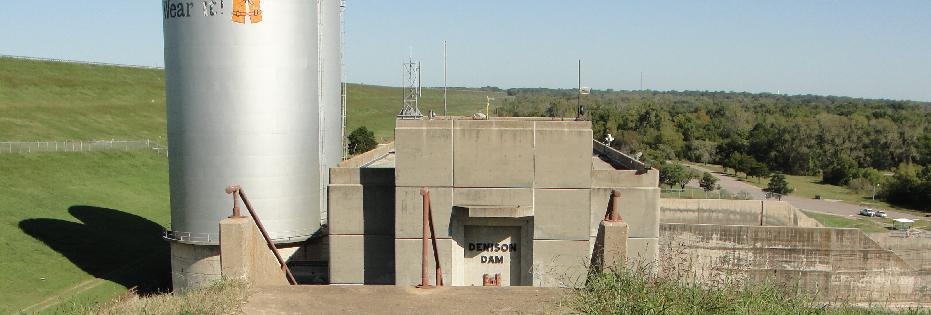
Denison Dam is the oldest dam in the SWPA. It was completed in 1943.

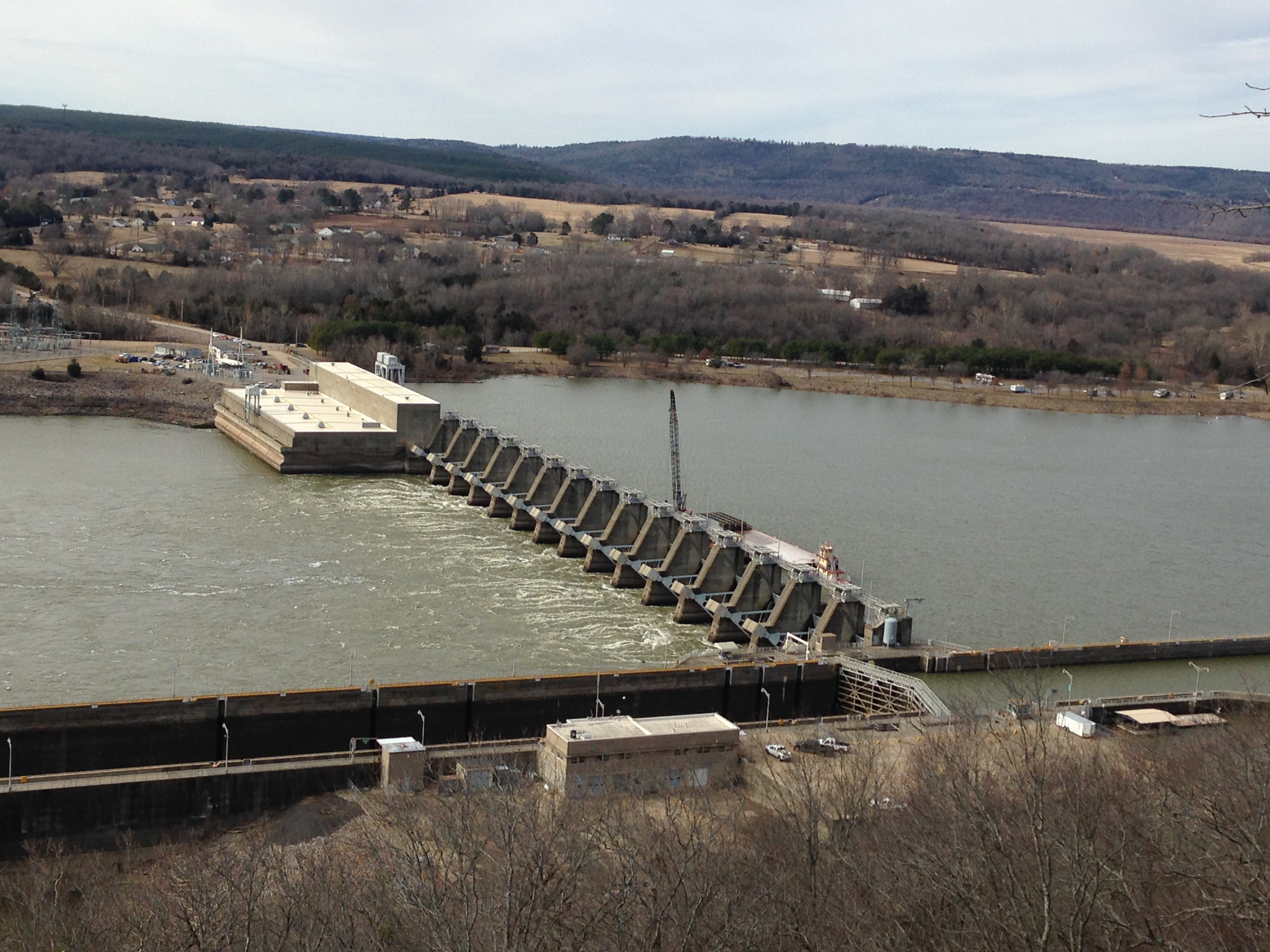
The Ozark-Jeta Taylor Lock and Dam in Ozark, Arkansas is a part of the Southwestern Power Administration. It is unique in that it is the only hydroelectric power station in the SWPA that doesn't create a reservoir like the other 23 dams. It is a low head dam

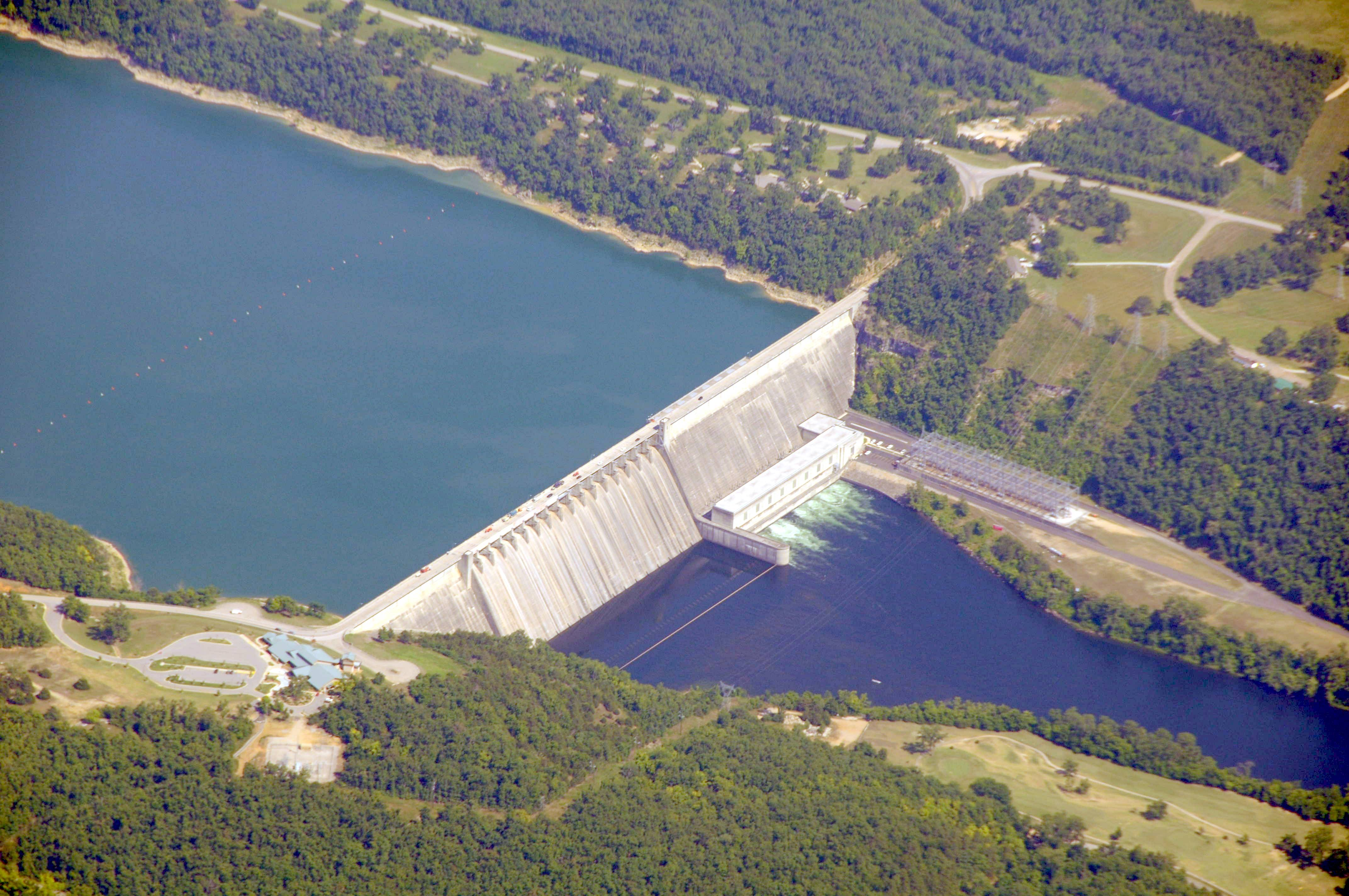
Bull Shoals Dam of North Arkansas

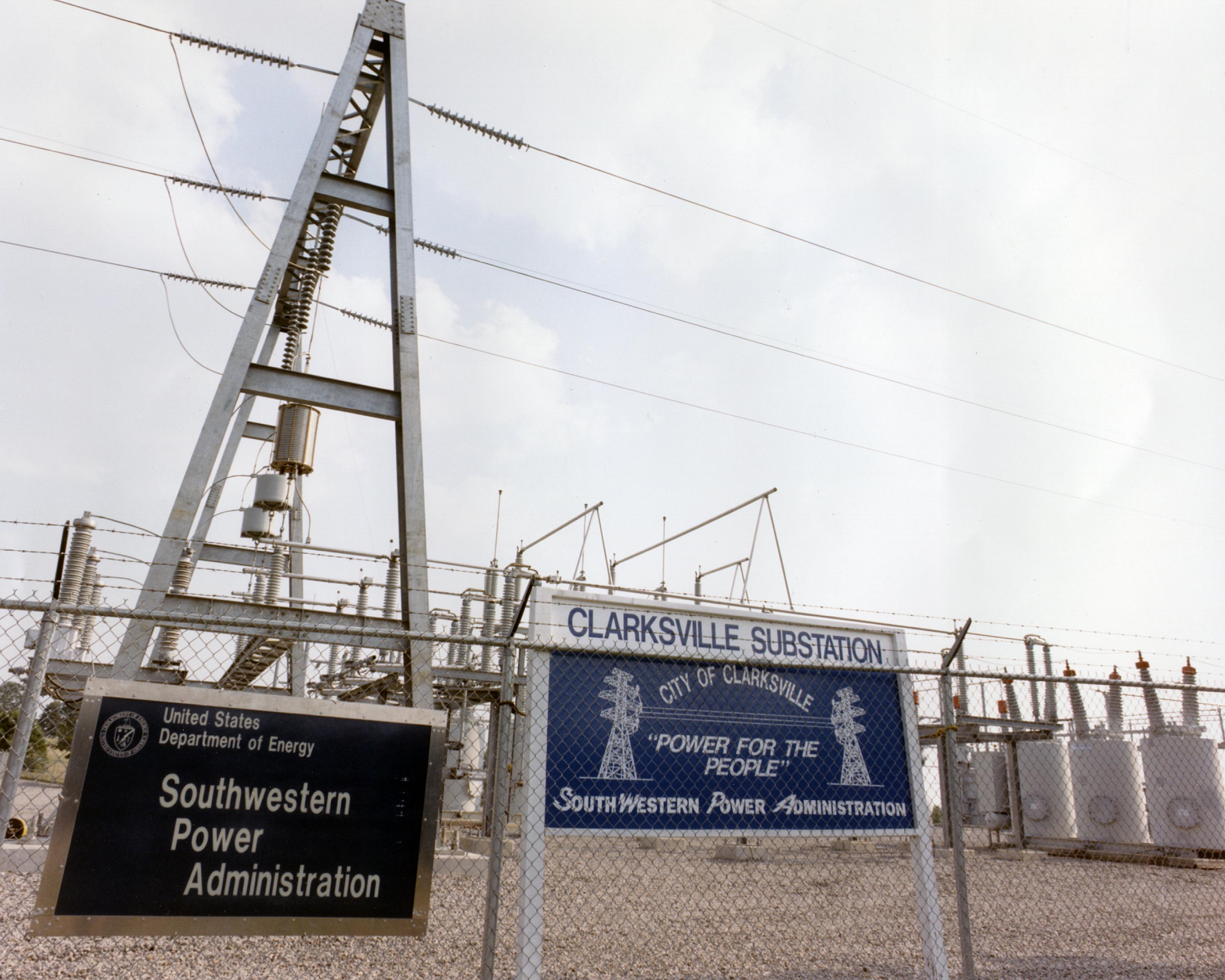
SWPA substation in Clarksville, Arkansas

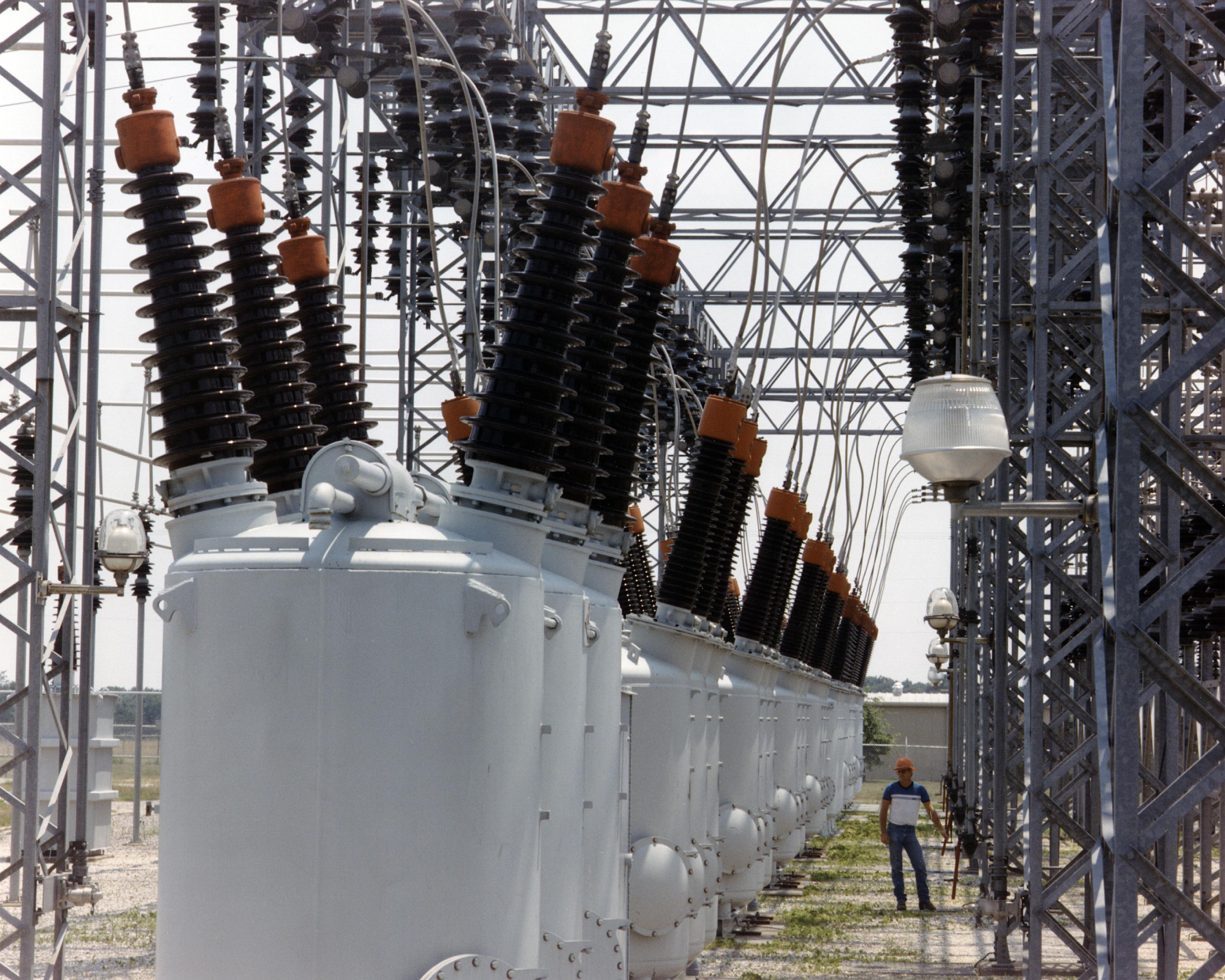
SWPA switchyard in Oklahoma

== Bibliography ==
- Roosevelt, Franklin D. (May 11, 1935). "Executive Order No. 7037 ~ The Establishment of the Rural Electrification Administration". Internet Archive. Washington, D.C.: National Archives and Records Service. pp. 172–175.
- Peters,Gerhard; Woolley, John T. "Franklin D. Roosevelt: "Executive Order 9366 - Relating to the Operation and Disposition of Electric Energy at the Denison Dam, the Grand River Dam, and the Norfork Dam, in the States of Texas, Oklahoma, and Arkansas" July 30, 1943". The American Presidency Project. University of California - Santa Barbara.
- U.S. General Accounting Office (November 22, 1972). "Southwestern Federal Power Program--Financial Progress and Problems" [Report to the Congress by the Comptroller General of the United States]. HathiTrust Digital Library. Washington, D.C.: U.S. Government Printing Office.
- Ford, Jeanette W. (1982). "Electricity for a Region: The Southwest Power Administration". The Chronicles of Oklahoma. 60 (4 - Winter 1982-83). Oklahoma Historical Society: 448–459. LCCN 23027299. OCLC 655582328.
