= Power Marketing Administration =

Type of US federal agency for selling hydroelectricity

This power marketing area for Southeastern Power Administration.

The Power Marketing Administration (PMA) is a United States federal agency within the Department of Energy responsible for marketing hydropower, primarily from multiple-purpose water projects operated by the Bureau of Reclamation, the U.S. Army Corps of Engineers, and the International Boundary and Water Commission.

The federal government first assumed a role in power marketing in the early 1900s when power from federal water projects in excess of project needs was sold in order to repay the government's investment in the projects.

The Southeastern Power Administration is the only PMA that doesn't construct and own transmission lines, putting it at a disadvantage with regard to dealing with private utility companies compared to the other three PMAs. The SEPA has to contract with other utilities to provide transmission.

There are four federal PMAs, which market and deliver power in 34 U.S. states:

- Bonneville Power Administration (established 1937)
- Southwestern Power Administration (established 1943)
- Southeastern Power Administration (established 1950)
- Western Area Power Administration (established 1977)

A fifth PMA, the Alaska Power Administration, existed from 1967 to 1998. In 1995 Congress passed a law authorizing the sale of the two hydroelectric power projects in the APA, the Eklutna Hydroelectric Project and the Snettisham Hydroelectric Project, to private companies. It also authorized the termination of the APA.
