= Government of Utah =

U.S. state government

- Great Seal of the State of Utah
- Polity type: Presidential republic Federated state
- Constitution: Constitution of Utah

Legislative branch
- Name: Legislature
- Type: Bicameral
- Meeting place: Utah State Capitol
- Upper house
- Name: Senate
- Presiding officer: J. Stuart Adams, President
- Lower house
- Name: House of Representatives
- Presiding officer: Mike Schultz, Speaker

Executive branch
- Head of state and government
- Title: Governor
- Currently: Spencer Cox
- Appointer: Election
- Cabinet
- Name: Cabinet
- Leader: Governor
- Deputy leader: Lieutenant Governor
- Headquarters: Utah State Capitol

Judicial branch
- Name: Judiciary of Utah
- Courts: Courts of Utah
- Supreme Court
- Chief judge: Matthew B. Durrant
- Seat: Scott M. Matheson Courthouse, Salt Lake City

Utah is a state in the United States of America. Its government consists of a state executive, legislative, and judicial branch, laid forth by the Constitution and law of the State of Utah.

== Executive Branch ==
The executive powers of government are vested in the Governor. The current governor is Spencer Cox, a Republican. Gary Herbert, the previous governor, assumed the governorship on August 11, 2009, following the resignation of Governor Jon Huntsman, Jr., who was appointed United States Ambassador to China by President Barack Obama. Herbert was elected for a further four-year term in 2012 and 2016. In 2019, Herbert announced he would not seek a third full term in 2020, and endorsed then-Lieutenant Governor Cox for governor. In the 2020 Utah gubernatorial election, Cox was elected governor, after first defeating former Governor Jon Huntsman, Jr., former Utah GOP chair Thomas Wright, and former Utah House Speaker Greg Hughes in the Republican primary, then defeating Democratic nominee Chris Peterson in the general election.

Officers

Office	Office-holder
Governor	Spencer Cox
Lieutenant Governor	Deidre Henderson
Attorney General	Sean Reyes
State Treasurer	Marlo Oaks
State Auditor	John Dougall

The Governor's Cabinet consists of the following appointees, who are the heads of the agencies listed:

- Executive Director, Utah Department of Administrative Services
- Commissioner, Utah Department of Agriculture and Food
- Executive Director, Utah Department of Corrections
- Chief Information Officer for the State of Utah, Utah Department of Technology Services
- Executive Director, Utah Department of Commerce
- Executive Director, Utah Department of Environmental Quality
- Commissioner, Utah Department of Financial Institutions
- Executive Director, Utah Governor's Office of Economic Development
- Executive Director, Utah Department of Health
- Executive Director, Utah Department of Human Resource Management
- Executive Director, Utah Department of Human Services
- Commissioner, Utah Insurance Department
- Adjutant General of Utah, Utah National Guard
- Executive Director, Utah Department of Natural Resources
- Commissioner, Utah Department of Public Safety
- Executive Director, Utah Department of Transportation
- Executive Director, Utah Department of Community and Culture
- Executive Director, Utah Department of Workforce Services
- Executive Director, Utah Department of Veteran Affairs
- Chairperson, Utah Board of Pardons and Parole
- Commissioner, Utah Labor Commission
- Commissioner, Utah State Tax Commission

== Legislative Branch ==
The legislative powers of government are vested in the Senate, House of Representatives and the people. Both the Utah Senate and the Utah House of Representatives have a Republican majority.

=== Utah State Senate ===
Leadership

- President: Stuart Adams (R-22)

Majority (Republican) Leadership

- Majority Leader: Evan Vickers (R-28)
- Majority Whip: Ann Millner (R-18)

Minority (Democratic) Leadership

- Minority Leader: Karen Mayne (D-5)
- Minority Whip: Luz Escamilla (D-1)

=== Utah State House of Representatives ===
Leadership

- Speaker of the House: Brad Wilson (R-15)

Majority (Republican) Leadership

- Majority Leader: Francis D. Gibson (R-65)
- Majority Whip: Mike Schultz (R-12)

Minority (Democratic) Leadership

- Minority Leader: Brian King (D-28)
- Minority Whip: Karen Kwan (D-34)

== Judicial Branch ==
The judicial powers of government are vested in a Supreme Court, district courts, and other courts of record.

=== Supreme Court ===
Office	Office-holder
Chief Justice	Matthew B. Durrant
Associate Chief Justice	Thomas R. Lee
Associate Justice	Constandinos Himonas
Associate Justice	John A. Pearce
Associate Justice	Paige Petersen

=== District Courts ===
District	Counties
1	Box Elder, Cache, and Rich
2	Davis, Morgan, and Weber
3	Salt Lake, Summit, and Tooele
4	Juab, Millard, Utah, and Wasatch
5	Beaver, Iron, and Washington
6	Garfield, Kane, Piute, Sanpete, Sevier, and Wayne
7	Carbon, Emery, Grand, and San Juan
8	Daggett, Duchesne, and Uintah
