= 2020 Utah gubernatorial election =

- November 3, 2020
- Turnout: 69.17% ▲
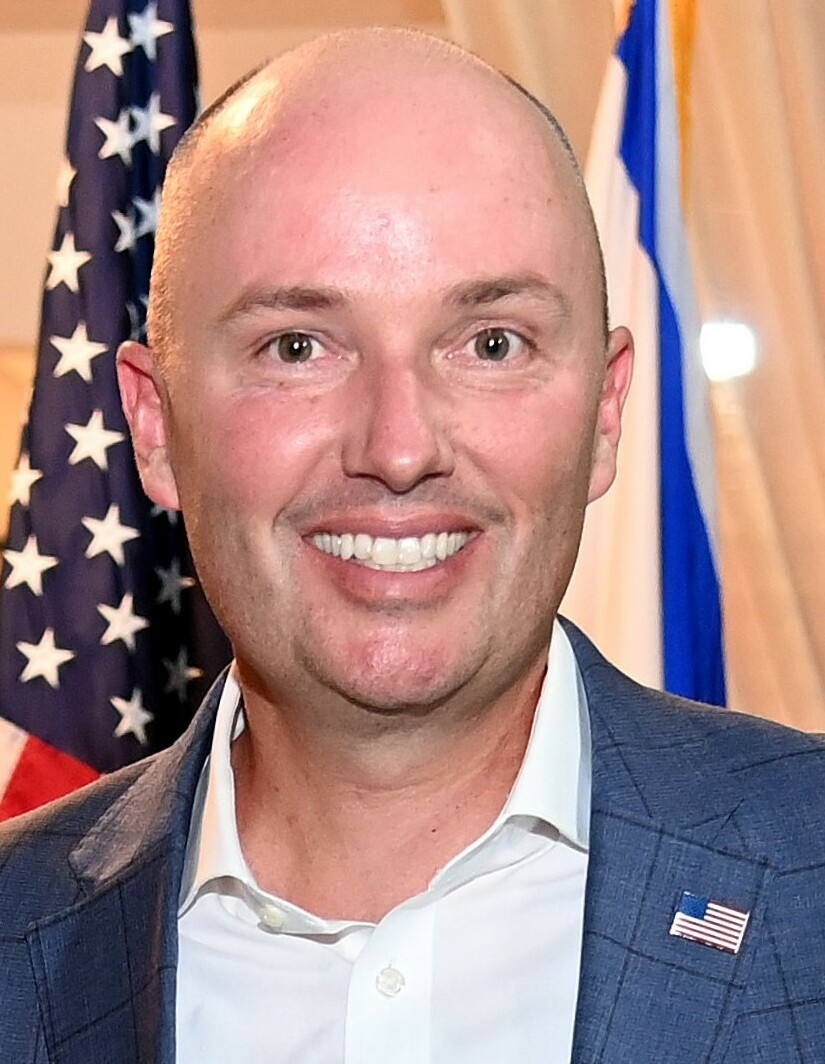

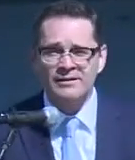
Nominee	Spencer Cox	Christopher Peterson
Party	Republican	Democratic
Running mate	Deidre Henderson	Karina Brown
Popular vote	918,754	442,754
Percentage	62.98%	30.35%
- Cox: 30–40% 40–50% 50–60% 60–70% 70–80% 80–90% >90% Peterson: 40–50% 50–60% 60–70% 70–80% 80–90% >90% Tie: 40–50% 50% No data
Governor before election
Gary Herbert
Republican
Elected Governor
Spencer Cox
Republican

The 2020 Utah gubernatorial election was held on November 3, 2020, to elect the governor of Utah. Incumbent Republican Governor Gary Herbert declined to run for election to a third full term.

== Background ==
Although incumbent Republican governor Gary Herbert was eligible to run for re-election to a third full term, he initially announced shortly after being re-elected in 2016 that he would not run again, but indicated in January 2019 that he was open to the possibility of running again before ultimately deciding to retire and endorse his lieutenant governor, Spencer Cox. Utah had not had a Democratic governor since Scott M. Matheson left office in January 1985. This is the second longest active streak of one-party leadership, trailing only South Dakota, which had not had a Democratic governor since Harvey L. Wollman left office in 1979.

The primaries took place on June 30, 2020. The filing deadline was on June 19, 2020.

== Description ==
The 2020 Utah gubernatorial election was held on November 3, 2020, to elect the governor of Utah, concurrently with the 2020 U.S. presidential election, as well as elections to the United States Senate and elections to the United States House of Representatives and various state and local elections.

The winner of the election was the first non-incumbent gubernatorial candidate to be elected since Jon Huntsman Jr. in 2004, who ran in this election before he was eliminated in the primaries.

Lieutenant Governor Spencer Cox won the general election by defeating the Democratic nominee, University of Utah law professor and former CFPB official Christopher Peterson. This election was the first open-seat gubernatorial election in Utah since 1992.

== Republican primary ==
=== Candidates ===
==== Nominee ====
- Spencer Cox, Lieutenant Governor of Utah
  - Running mate: Deidre Henderson, state senator and candidate for UT-03 in 2017

==== Eliminated in the primary ====
- Greg Hughes, former speaker of the Utah House of Representatives
  - Running mate: Victor Iverson, Washington County Commission Chairman
- Jon Huntsman Jr., former United States Ambassador to Russia, China and Singapore, former governor of Utah, and candidate for president in 2012
  - Running mate: Michelle Kaufusi, Mayor of Provo
- Thomas Wright, Republican National Committee executive committee member and former chair of the Utah Republican Party
  - Running mate: Rob Bishop, U.S. representative for Utah's 1st congressional district and former speaker of the Utah House of Representatives

==== Eliminated at the convention ====
- Jeff Burningham, businessman
  - Running mate: Dan McCay, state senator
- Jason Christensen, activist
  - Running mate: Drew Chamberlain
- Jan Garbett, businesswoman
  - Running mate: Joseph Jarvis, physician and small business owner
- Aimee Winder Newton, Salt Lake County councilwoman (Endorsed Cox)
  - Running mate: John Dougall, Utah state auditor

==== Declined ====
- Rob Bishop, U.S. representative (endorsed Wright, who in turn chose Bishop to run with him as his lieutenant governor)
- Jason Chaffetz, former U.S. representative
- John Dougall, Utah state auditor
- Gary Herbert, incumbent governor (endorsed Cox)
- Mike Lee, U.S. senator (endorsed Huntsman)
- Greg Miller, former CEO of the Utah Jazz
- Sean Reyes, Attorney General of Utah
- Josh Romney, real estate developer and son of Mitt Romney

=== Endorsements ===
Spencer Cox

Federal officials

- John Curtis, United States representative from Utah's 3rd congressional district

State officials

- Gary Herbert, Governor of Utah

Local officials

- Aimee Winder Newton, Salt Lake County councilwoman and former Republican candidate in 2020 Utah gubernatorial election

Organizations

- Utah Education Association (UEA)

Individuals

- Gail Miller, Utah Jazz owner
Jon Huntsman Jr.

Federal officials

- Orrin Hatch, former U.S. senator from Utah (1977-2019)
- Mike Lee, U.S. senator from Utah

Individuals

- Karl Malone, retired professional basketball player
Thomas Wright

Federal officials

- Rob Bishop, U.S. representative from Utah's 1st congressional district (Running mate)

=== Polling ===
Poll source	Date(s) administered	Sample size	Margin of error	Rob Bishop	Jeff Burningham	Jason Chaffetz	Spencer Cox	Jan Garbett	Greg Hughes	Jon Huntsman Jr.	Greg Miller	Aimee Winder Newton	Sean Reyes	Thomas Wright	Other / Undecided
Dan Jones & Associates/Salt Lake Chamber of Commerce	June 17–24, 2020	1,247 (LV)	± 2.77%	—	—	—	30%	—	15%	29%	—	—	—	6%	19% (Note: "Prefer not to answer" with 19%)
Y2 Analytics UtahPolicy/KUTV 2 News	June 9–17, 2020	797 (LV) (Note: Including registered Republican likely primary voters and currently unaffiliated likely primary voters)	—	—	—	—	32%	—	23%	36%	—	—	—	9%	—
Y2 Analytics/Cox for Governor (Note: Poll sponsored by Cox's campaign)	June 13–16, 2020	691 (LV)	± 3.72%	—	—	—	34%	—	20%	28%	—	—	—	9%	9% (Note: "Don't know/refused" with 9%)
Dan Jones & Associates/Salt Lake Chamber of Commerce	June 1–10, 2020	676 (LV)	± 3.77%	—	—	—	32% (Note: Including voters who lean towards a given candidate)	—	10%	37%	—	—	—	5%	4% (Note: Undecided with 4%)
Suffolk University/Salt Lake Tribune	June 4–7, 2020	500 (LV)	± 4.4%	—	—	—	32%	—	10%	30%	—	—	—	8%	17%
Deseret News/Hinckley Institute	May 25–31, 2020	643 (LV)	—	—	—	—	28%	—	18%	24%	—	—	—	4%	26%
Y2 Analytics/UtahPolicy/KUTV 2 News	May 9–15, 2020	610 (LV) (Note: Including registered Republican likely primary voters and currently unaffiliated likely primary voters)	—	—	—	—	40%	—	18%	34%	—	—	—	8%	—
	April 25, 2020	All remaining candidates except Cox, Hughes, Huntsman Jr. and Wright eliminated at convention													
Y2 Analytics	March 21–30, 2020	738 (LV) (Note: Including registered Republican likely primary voters and currently unaffiliated likely primary voters)	–	—	5%	—	39%	< 1%	17%	33%	—	4%	—	1%	< 1% (Note: Christensen with <1%)
Hinckley Institute	March 23–28, 2020	326 (LV)	± 5.4%	—	7%	—	24%	1%	7%	26%	—	2%	—	2%	32%
Dan Jones & Associates	February 28 – March 11, 2020	338 (V)	± 5.3%	—	6%	—	30%	2%	12%	27%	—	4%	—	6%	15%
Hinckley Institute	February 24 – March 1, 2020	312 (LV)	± 5.5%	—	7%	—	20%	1%	7%	32%	—	2%	—	1%	30%
	February 21, 2020	Garbett announces her candidacy													
Suffolk University/Salt Lake Tribune	January 18–22, 2020	246 (LV)	± 6.3%	—	1%	—	18%	–	7%	26%	—	1%	—	1%	46%
Hinckley Institute/Deseret News	January 15–22, 2020	424 (LV)	± 4.8%	—	6%	—	25%	–	3%	35%	—	3%	—	3%	25%
	January 17, 2020	Reyes announces he will not run													
	January 13, 2020	Bishop announces he will not run													
	January 8, 2020	Hughes announces his candidacy													
	January 2, 2020	Wright announces his candidacy													
Y2 Analytics	November 19 – December 7, 2019	457 (V)	± 4.6%	9%	5%	—	41%	–	5%	29%	–	5%	5%	1%	—
	November 14, 2019	Huntsman Jr. announces his candidacy													
	October 23, 2019	Newton announces her candidacy													
Dan Jones & Associates/Salt; Lake Chamber of Commerce	October 3–10, 2019	271 (V)	–	—	2%	—	34%	–	2%	30%	—	—	–	7%	25%
	October 2, 2019	Miller announces he will not run													
	September 10, 2019	Burningham announces his candidacy													
	June 3, 2019	Chaffetz announces he will not run													
	May 14, 2019	Cox announces his candidacy													
University of Utah	January 15–24, 2019	311 (RV)	± 5.6%	10%	–	27%	28%	–	4%	–	2%	—	4%	–	24%
University of Utah	October 3–9, 2018	291 (RV)	± 6.0%	11%	–	25%	16%	–	3%	–	2%	—	7%	–	36%
Hinckley Institute/Salt Lake Tribune	June 11–18, 2018	510 (V)	± 4.3%	9%	–	25%	16%	–	3%	–	–	—	9%	–	37%

=== Convention results ===
Republican convention results
Candidate/running mate	Round 1		Round 2		Round 3		Round 4		Round 5		Round 6	
Candidate/running mate	Votes	%	Votes	%	Votes	%	Votes	%	Votes	%	Votes	%
Spencer Cox/Deidre Henderson	1081	30.2%	1082	30.2%	1223	34.3%	1287	36.3%	1488	42.4%	1884	55.0%
Greg Hughes/Victor Iverson	663	18.5%	674	18.8%	719	20.2%	901	25.4%	1107	31.5%	1544	45.0%
Aimee Winder Newton/John 'Frugal' Dougall	500	14.0%	508	14.2%	540	15.1%	703	19.8%	918	26.1%	Eliminated	
Thomas Wright/Rob Bishop	489	13.7%	494	13.8%	553	15.5%	658	18.5%	Eliminated			
Jeff Burningham/Dan McCay	487	13.6%	504	14.1%	530	14.9%	Eliminated					
Jon Huntsman Jr./Michelle Kaufusi	315	8.8%	315	8.8%	Eliminated							
Jason Christensen/Drew Chamberlain	44	1.2%	Eliminated									
Inactive ballots	0 ballots		2 ballots		14 ballots		30 ballots		66 ballots		151 ballots	

=== Debate ===
2020 Utah gubernatorial election republican primary debate
No.	Date	Host	Moderator	Link	Republican	Republican	Republican	Republican
Key: P Participant A Absent N Not invited I Invited W Withdrawn								
Key: P Participant A Absent N Not invited I Invited W Withdrawn					Spencer Cox	Greg Hughes	Jon Huntsman Jr.	Thomas Wright
1	Jun. 1, 2020	Utah Debate Commission	Bruce Lindsay		P	P	P	P

=== Primary results ===
2020 primary results by county: Cox: Cox—60–70%; Cox—50–60%; Cox—40–50%; Cox—30–40%; Huntsman: Huntsman—30–40%; Huntsman—40–50%; Huntsman—50–60%; Hughes: Hughes—30–40%; Hughes—40–50%

Republican primary results
Party	Candidate	Votes	%
Republican	Spencer Cox	190,565	36.15%
Republican	Jon Huntsman Jr.	184,246	34.95%
Republican	Greg Hughes	110,835	21.02%
Republican	Thomas Wright	41,532	7.88%
Total votes		527,178	100%

== Democratic primary ==
=== Candidates ===
==== Nominee ====
- Christopher Peterson, University of Utah law professor and former CFPB official
  - Running mate: Karina Brown, community organizer

==== Eliminated at the convention ====
- Neil Hansen, former state representative
  - Running mate: Brandy Farmer, candidate for Utah House of Representatives
- Ryan Jackson
- Zachary Moses, CEO of HeTravel.com
  - Running mate: Nate Kizerian, community activist
- Nikki Pino Jr., youth counselor
  - Running mate: Nikki Pino Sr., retired Army lieutenant colonel and father to Nikki Pino Jr.
- Archie A Williams, 2014 Democratic candidate for District 60 of the Utah House of Representatives III

==== Declined ====
- Peter Corroon, former Utah Democratic Party chair, former mayor of Salt Lake County, and nominee for governor in 2010
- Scott Howell, former state senator and nominee for U.S. Senate in 2000 and 2012
- Patricia W. Jones, former state senator
- Brian King, minority leader of the Utah House of Representatives (endorsed Peterson)
- Jim Matheson, former U.S. representative
- Ben McAdams, U.S. representative (running for re-election)
- Peter Metcalf, former CEO of Black Diamond Equipment
- Paul Rolly, former columnist for The Salt Lake Tribune
- Jim Winder, former Salt Lake County Sheriff

=== Polling ===
Poll source	Date(s) administered	Sample size (Note: Key: A – all adults RV – registered voters LV – likely voters V – unclear)	Margin of error	Neil Hansen	Ryan Jackson	Zachary Moses	Christopher Peterson	Nikki Pino	Archie Williams III	Other / Undecided
Y2 Analytics/UtahPolicy/KUTV 2 News	March 21–30, 2020	167 (LV)	± 7.6%	11%	11%	7%	38%	28%	5%	10%

=== Convention results ===
Democratic convention results
Candidate	Pct.
Christopher Peterson	88.4%
Zachary Moses	4.7%
Neil Hansen	4.0%
Nikki Ray Pino	1.4%
Ryan Jackson	1.4%
Archie Williams III	0.1%

== Other candidates ==
=== Independent American Party ===
==== Nominee ====
- Gregory Duerden,
  - Wayne Hill, Vice Chair of the Utah Independent American Party

=== Libertarian Party ===
==== Nominee ====
- Daniel Cottam, Bariatric Surgeon
  - Running mate: Barry Short, businessman and Vice Chair of the Libertarian Party of Utah

=== Republican write-in ===
- Madeline Kazantzis ran for election for Governor of Utah as a write-in in the general election on November 3, 2020. She received 18,988 votes.

==== Declined ====
- Jon Huntsman Jr., former United States Ambassador to Russia, China and Singapore, former governor of Utah, and candidate for president in 2012

== General election ==
=== Campaign ===
An advertisement that featured both major-party candidates, calling for civility in politics, drew significant media coverage and praise.

=== Predictions ===
Source	Ranking	As of
The Cook Political Report	Safe R	October 23, 2020
Inside Elections	Safe R	October 28, 2020
Sabato's Crystal Ball	Safe R	November 2, 2020
Politico	Safe R	November 2, 2020
Daily Kos	Safe R	October 28, 2020
RCP	Safe R	November 2, 2020
270towin	Safe R	November 2, 2020

=== Endorsements ===
Spencer Cox (R)

Federal officials

- John Curtis, United States representative from Utah's 3rd congressional district

State officials

- Gary Herbert, Governor of Utah

Local officials

- Aimee Winder Newton, Salt Lake County councilwoman and former Republican candidate in 2020 Utah gubernatorial election

Organizations

- Utah Education Association (UEA)

Individuals

- Gail Miller, Utah Jazz owner

=== Polling ===
Graphical summary

Polls

Poll source	Date(s) administered	Sample size	Margin of error	Spencer Cox (R)	Christopher Peterson (D)	Daniel Cottam (L)	Gregory Duerden (IAP)	Other	Undecided
Y2 Analytics/Salt Lake Tribune	October 15–24, 2020	660 (LV)	± 3.8%	58%	33%	–	–	–	–
RMG Research/Deseret News/Hinckley Institute of Politics	October 12–17, 2020	1,000 (LV)	± 3.1%	50%	26%	6%	3%	–	16%
Y2 Analytics/Salt Lake Tribune	September 26 – October 4, 2020	1,214 (LV)	± 2.8%	57%	29%	–	–	14%	–
RMG Research/Deseret News/Hinckley Institute of Politics	September 7–12, 2020	1,000 (LV)	± 3.1%	52%	19%	4%	3%	–	22%
Lighthouse Research/Salt Lake Tribune	August 31 – September 12, 2020	2,000 (RV)	± 4.38%	55%	20%	5%	3%	3%	15%
RMG Research	July 27 – August 1, 2020	1000 (RV)	± 4.0%	49%	17%	3%	3%	–	29%

Hypothetical polling

with Spencer Eccles

Poll source	Date(s) administered	Sample size	Margin of error	Jeff Burningham	Spencer Cox	Spencer Eccles	Greg Hughes	Jon Huntsman Jr.	Thomas Wright	Other / Undecided
Dan Jones & Associates/Salt; Lake Chamber of Commerce	Oct 3–10, 2019	599 (LV)	± 4%	2%	26%	5%	2%	33%	4%	21%

with only Spencer Cox, Greg Hughes and Jon Huntsman

Poll source	Date(s) administered	Sample size	Margin of error	Spencer Cox	Greg Hughes	Jon Huntsman Jr.	Other / Undecided
Dan Jones & Associates/Salt; Lake Chamber of Commerce	Jun 11-Jul 1, 2019	801 (LV)	–	37%	8%	43%	12%

with Generic Democrat

Poll source	Date(s) administered	Sample size	Margin of error	Spencer Cox	Greg Hughes	Jon Huntsman Jr.	Aimee Winder-Newton	Thomas Wright	Generic Democrat (D)	Other / Undecided
Dan Jones & Associates/Salt; Lake Chamber of Commerce	Jun 11-Jul 1, 2019	801 (LV)	–	33%	5%	32%	2%	5%	11%	13%

with Bishop, Chaffetz, Cox, Dougall, Hughes, Miller, Newton, Reyes and Generic Democrat (D)

Poll source	Date(s) administered	Sample size	Margin of error	Rob Bishop	Jason Chaffetz	Spencer Cox	Generic Democrat (D)	Other / Undecided
Dan Jones & Associates/UtahPolicy	Jan 3–15, 2019	822 (RV)	± 3.4%	7%	18%	24%	11%	39% (Note: Undecided with 26%, Reyes with 5%; "Other" with 3%; Miller and Winder-Newton with 2%; Hughes with 1%; Dougall with 0%)

with Jason Chaffetz, Spencer Cox, Spencer Eccles, Greg Hughes, Ben McAdams, Greg Miller and Josh Romney

Poll source	Date(s) administered	Sample size	Margin of error	Jason Chaffetz	Spencer Cox	Ben McAdams	Josh Romney	Other	Undecided
Dan Jones & Associates/Salt Lake Tribune/Hinkley Institute	Oct 10–13, 2017	605 (RV)	± 3.98%	24%	11%	20%	9%	11% (Note: Eccles, Hughes and "Other" with 3%; Miller with 2%)	26%

=== Results ===

2020 Utah gubernatorial election
Party	Candidate	Votes	%	±%
Republican	Spencer Cox; Deidre Henderson	918,754	62.98%	−3.76%
Democratic	Christopher Peterson; Karina Brown	442,754	30.35%	+1.61%
Libertarian	Daniel Cottam; Barry Short	51,393	3.52%	+0.42%
Independent American	Gregory Duerden; Wayne Hill	25,810	1.77%	+0.36%
Write-in		20,167	1.38%	+1.37%
Total votes		1,458,878	100%	
Turnout		1,515,845	69.17%	
Registered electors		1,682,512		
Republican hold				

==== By county ====
By county

County	Spencer Cox Republican		Chris Peterson Democratic		Daniel Cottam Libertarian		Greg Duerden Ind. American		Write-in		Margin		Total votes
County	#	%	#	%	#	%	#	%	#	%	#	%	Total votes
Beaver	2,468	83.27	291	9.82	102	3.44	48	1.62	55	1.86	2,177	73.45	2,964
Box Elder	20,642	77.75	3,507	13.21	1,038	3.91	553	2.08	809	3.05	17,135	64.54	26,549
Cache	39,952	70.64	12,943	22.88	1,948	3.44	835	1.48	882	1.56	27,009	47.75	56,560
Carbon	6,506	72.10	2,091	23.17	271	3.00	155	1.72	0	0.00	4,415	48.93	9,023
Daggett	469	79.36	91	15.40	10	1.69	15	2.54	6	1.02	378	63.96	591
Davis	115,501	68.61	41,101	24.41	6,018	3.57	4,374	2.60	1,359	0.81	74,400	44.19	168,353
Duchesne	6,096	73.93	739	8.96	308	3.74	210	2.55	893	10.83	5,357	64.96	8,246
Emery	3,918	82.82	489	10.34	105	2.22	88	1.86	131	2.77	3,429	72.48	4,731
Garfield	2,123	80.26	428	16.18	73	2.76	21	0.79	0	0.00	1,695	64.08	2,645
Grand	2,303	45.59	2,499	49.47	158	3.13	56	1.11	36	0.71	-196	-3.88	5,052
Iron	17,650	73.19	3,854	15.98	1,425	5.91	644	2.67	543	2.25	13,796	57.21	24,116
Juab	4,606	80.30	470	8.19	211	3.68	219	3.82	230	4.01	4,136	72.11	5,736
Kane	2,802	69.70	918	22.84	140	3.48	71	1.77	89	2.21	1,884	46.87	4,020
Millard	4,528	75.57	519	8.66	183	3.05	168	2.80	594	9.91	4,009	66.91	5,992
Morgan	5,190	81.09	770	12.03	229	3.58	122	1.91	89	1.39	4,420	69.06	6,400
Piute	672	80.96	65	7.83	36	4.34	27	3.25	30	3.61	607	73.13	830
Rich	1,081	81.03	158	11.84	28	2.10	16	1.20	51	3.82	923	69.19	1,334
Salt Lake	266,177	50.32	238,249	45.04	16,001	3.02	6,137	1.16	2,402	0.45	27,928	5.28	528,966
San Juan	3,477	52.84	2,642	40.15	258	3.92	135	2.05	68	1.03	835	12.69	6,580
Sanpete	10,326	82.91	1,012	8.13	363	2.91	388	3.12	365	2.93	9,314	74.79	12,454
Sevier	8,364	82.43	882	8.69	288	2.84	271	2.67	342	3.37	7,482	73.74	10,147
Summit	11,290	44.62	13,066	51.64	587	2.32	205	0.81	153	0.60	-1,776	-7.02	25,301
Tooele	21,293	69.47	7,058	23.03	1,383	4.51	662	2.16	253	0.83	14,235	46.45	30,649
Uintah	10,290	69.35	1,482	9.99	509	3.43	367	2.47	2,190	14.76	8,808	59.36	14,838
Utah	208,514	74.07	52,524	18.66	10,798	3.84	5,355	1.90	4,307	1.53	155,990	55.41	281,498
Wasatch	11,472	66.34	4,911	28.40	509	2.94	202	1.17	199	1.15	6,561	37.94	17,293
Washington	61,125	69.57	16,698	19.00	4,432	5.04	2,520	2.87	3,087	3.51	44,427	50.56	87,862
Wayne	1,115	70.52	321	20.30	55	3.48	46	2.91	44	2.76	794	50.22	1,581
Weber	68,804	63.37	32,976	30.37	3,927	3.62	1,900	1.75	960	0.88	35,828	33.00	108,567
Totals	918,754	62.98	442,754	30.35	51,393	3.52	25,810	1.77	20,167	1.38	476,000	32.63	1,458,878

Counties that flipped from Republican to Democratic

- Grand (largest municipality: Moab)

==== By congressional district ====
Cox won all four congressional districts.

District	Cox	Peterson	Representative
1st	66%	25%	Rob Bishop
1st	66%	25%	Blake Moore
2nd	57%	33%	Chris Stewart
3rd	67%	27%	John Curtis
4th	59%	35%	Ben McAdams
4th	59%	35%	Burgess Owens

== Notes ==
Additional candidates

General
