= Margaret Bird =

American economist and activist

- Born: 1947 (age 78–79)
- Education: Vanderbilt University; University of Utah
- Occupation: Economist

Margaret R. Bird (born 1947) is an economist and school trust lands activist in Utah. She is an executive director of the non-profit organization Children's Land Alliance Supporting Schools (CLASS). She has served on the Utah Board of Oil, Gas, and Mining and is currently a member of the Draper Tree Commission.

In 2008, Bird ran unsuccessfully against Utah Republican Greg Hughes for Utah House Seat 51. She did not make it past the Republican Convention in her run for the office.

== Education ==
Bird received her bachelor's degree in Theoretical Mathematics from Vanderbilt University and her master's degree in economics from the University of Utah.

== School Trust Land Reform ==
Bird led the efforts to reform the operations of school trust lands in Utah. She compared the Trust Lands Administration in its early days to an apartment complex in which the tenants decided how high their rent would be. Her job, she said, was to take back the school-trust lands from the tenants - the ranchers and miners and oilmen - and start "running it like a business."

For these efforts, the Utah State Bar gave her their Community Member of the Year Award in 1997 "to a community member for significant contributions to the legal profession."

Bird created the Children's Land Alliance Supporting Schools organization to advocate for school trust land reforms in other states. She testified before the Minnesota Legislature in March 2010 that "Utah's 1994 reforms turned its school trust fund from a poorly managed, oft-raided 'molehill' into a 'gold mine' worth $1 billion".

== Publications ==
- Permanent School Funds Created From the Proceeds of School Trust Grants (2005)

== See also ==
- Land trust
- State Trust Lands
