= Derrin Owens =

Member of the Utah State Senate

Member of the Utah Senate
- Incumbent
- Assumed office January 1, 2021
- Preceded by: Ralph Okerlund
- Constituency: 24th district (2021–2023); 27th district (2023–present)

Member of the Utah House of Representatives from the 58th district
- In office August 10, 2015 – December 31, 2020
- Preceded by: Jon Cox
- Succeeded by: Steve Lund

Personal details
- Born: April 7, Show Low, Arizona
- Party: Republican
- Education: Southern Utah University and Grand Canyon University
- Profession: School Counselor

Derrin R. Owens is an American politician and a Republican member of the Utah State Senate who represents Senate district 27 and previously district 24. He previously served Utah House of Representatives representing District 58 from August 10, 2015 to December 31, 2020.

== Early life and education ==
Owens was born in the Show Low, Arizona and is the eighth of nine children. After serving a mission for the Church of Jesus Christ of Latter-day Saints in Chicago, Illinois, his family moved to Ephraim, Utah. He received a bachelor's degree in Social Science from Southern Utah University. He received a master's degree in Education from Grand Canyon University. He is now a school counselor who works closely with the students at Juab High School. He currently lives in Fountain Green, Utah with his wife Heather and five children.

== Political career ==
2015 Owens was appointed by Governor Gary Herbert after the resignation of former Representative Jon Cox.

During the 2016 General Session Owens served on the House Business and Labor Committee, House Natural Resources, Agriculture, and Environment Committee, and Higher Education Appropriations Subcommittee. During the interim he serves on the Business and Labor Interim Committee and the Transportation Interim Committee.

In 2020, he announced he would instead run for the Utah State Senate, winning the November election with 90.2% of the vote, against Independent American Party of Utah candidate Warren Rogers.

== 2016 sponsored legislation ==
Bill number	Bill title	Status
HB0139	Transparency Advisory Board Modifications	Governor Signed - 3/18/2016
HB0226	Early Intervention Amendments	House/ filed - 3/10/2016
HB0447	Student Residence Amendments	House/ filed - 3/10/2016
HB0448	Airport Fee Amendments	Governor Signed - 3/23/2016

In 2016, Owens floor sponsored SB 144 Dead Domestic Animal Disposal Amendments.
