= Jon Cox (politician) =

American politician

Director of Communications for the Governor of Utah
- In office 2015–2016
- Governor: Gary Herbert
- Succeeded by: Aimee Edwards

Member of the Utah House of Representatives from the 58th district
- In office November 15, 2013 – July 2015
- Preceded by: Spencer Cox
- Succeeded by: Derrin Owens

Personal details
- Party: Republican
- Relations: Spencer Cox (cousin)
- Education: Utah State University (BA); University of Utah (MA)

Jon Cox is an American politician from the state of Utah. He is a member of the Republican Party and served as a member of the Utah House of Representatives until he resigned in 2015 to work as Governor Gary R. Herbert's director of communications.

== Education ==
Cox earned a Bachelor of Arts in communications from Utah State University and a Master of Arts in history from the University of Utah.

== Career ==
Cox worked in the office of Bob Bennett when he served in the United States Senate as a constituent liaison for five years. He then worked at Snow College as an assistant professor of history.

Cox was elected as a Sanpete County Commissioner in 2012, succeeding his fourth cousin, Spencer Cox, when Spencer was elected to the Utah House of Representatives. Republican Party delegates chose Jon Cox to succeed Spencer as the member of the Utah House for the 58th district following his appointment as Lieutenant Governor of Utah, and he was appointed by Gary Herbert on November 15.

During the 2014 General Session, he served on the House Business and Labor Committee as well as the House Political Subdivisions Committee.

In July 2015, Cox resigned to serve as communications director and senior adviser for Governor Herbert. After serving for one year, he became the vice president of government affairs at Rocky Mountain Power in September 2016. He was succeeded by communications consultant Aimee Edwards.

== Personal life ==
He currently lives in Ephraim, Utah.
