= Thomas Wright (Utah politician) =

American political executive and real estate broker

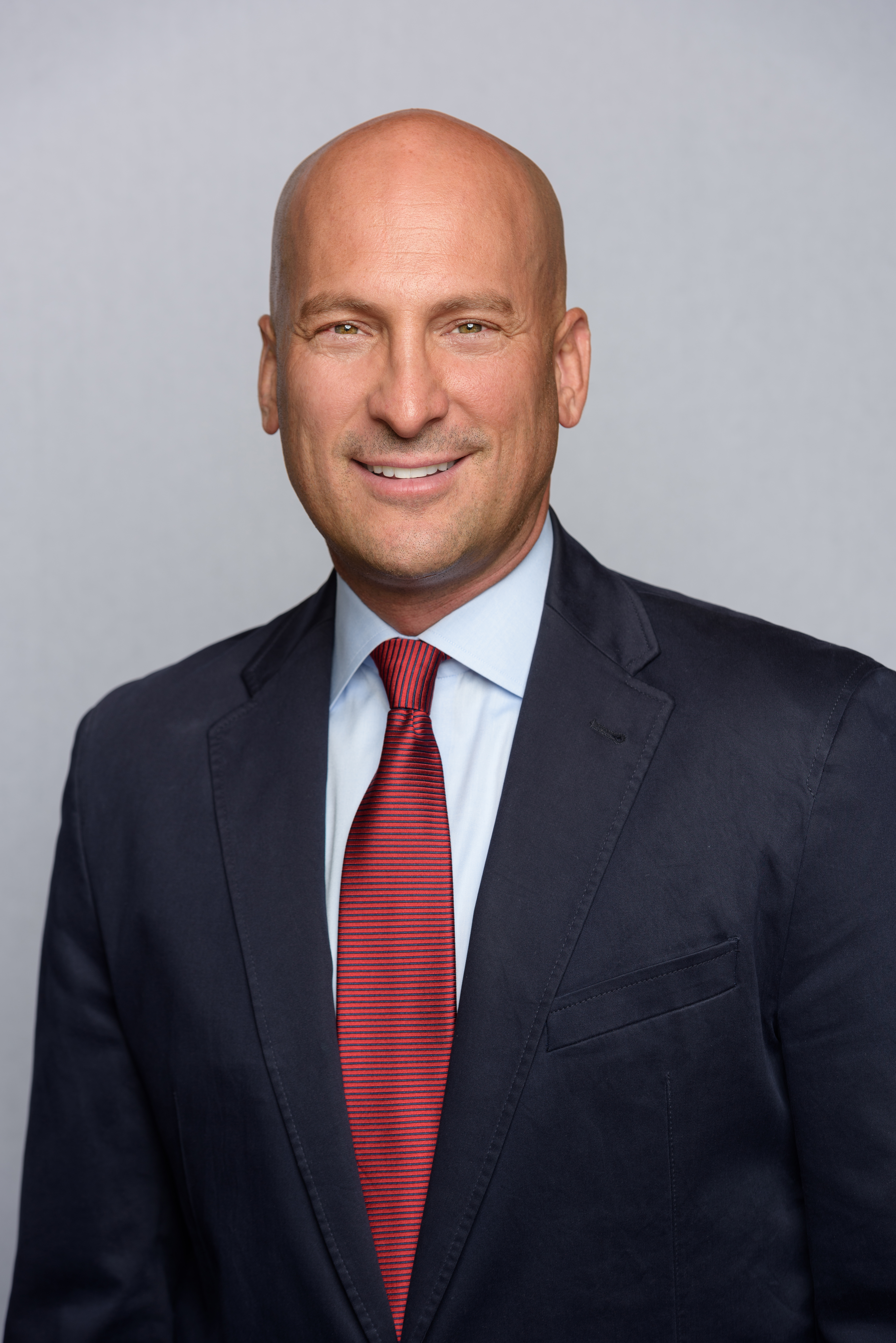

Chair of the Utah Republican Party
- In office January 22, 2011 – May 18, 2013
- Preceded by: Dave Hansen
- Succeeded by: James Evans

Personal details
- Born: 1973 or 1974 (age 52–53) Salt Lake City, Utah, U.S.
- Party: Republican
- Relatives: Bob Wright (father)
- Education: University of Utah (BA)
- Website: Official website

Thomas Wright (born 1973/1974) is an American politician, real estate broker, and was a candidate for the 2020 Utah gubernatorial election. Wright previously served as the chairman of the Utah Republican Party from 2011 to 2013.

== Early life and education ==
Wright was born and raised in Utah, the son of lawyer and politician Bob Wright. He attended Quince Orchard High School in Gaithersburg, Maryland, and later spent two years in Eastern Europe serving an LDS mission in Ukraine. After returning from Europe, Wright graduated from the University of Utah on a golf scholarship to the University of Utah, earning a Bachelor of Arts in Russian and Marketing. He has been married for over 20 years and has 4 children.

== Career ==
Wright is the owner, president, and principal broker of Summit Sotheby's International Realty, based in Park City, Utah.

Wright was nominated to serve on the Utah State Board of Regents by Governor Gary Herbert. He had previously served on the Dixie State University Board of Trustees. Wright has served as the co-chairman of the Utah Debate Commission and is a member of the Republican National Committee.

In January 2020, Wright announced his candidacy for governor in the 2020 Utah gubernatorial election. Wright ran against former governor and diplomat Jon Huntsman Jr., Lieutenant Governor Spencer Cox, former Speaker of the Utah House of Representatives Greg Hughes, Salt Lake City Councilwoman Aimee Winder Newton, and others. After announcing his candidacy, Wright named Congressman Rob Bishop as his running mate. He ultimately lost the primary election to Cox.

Party political offices
| Preceded by Dave Hansen | Chair of the Utah Republican Party; 2011–2013 | Succeeded by James Evans |
