= 2008 Utah gubernatorial election =

- November 4, 2008
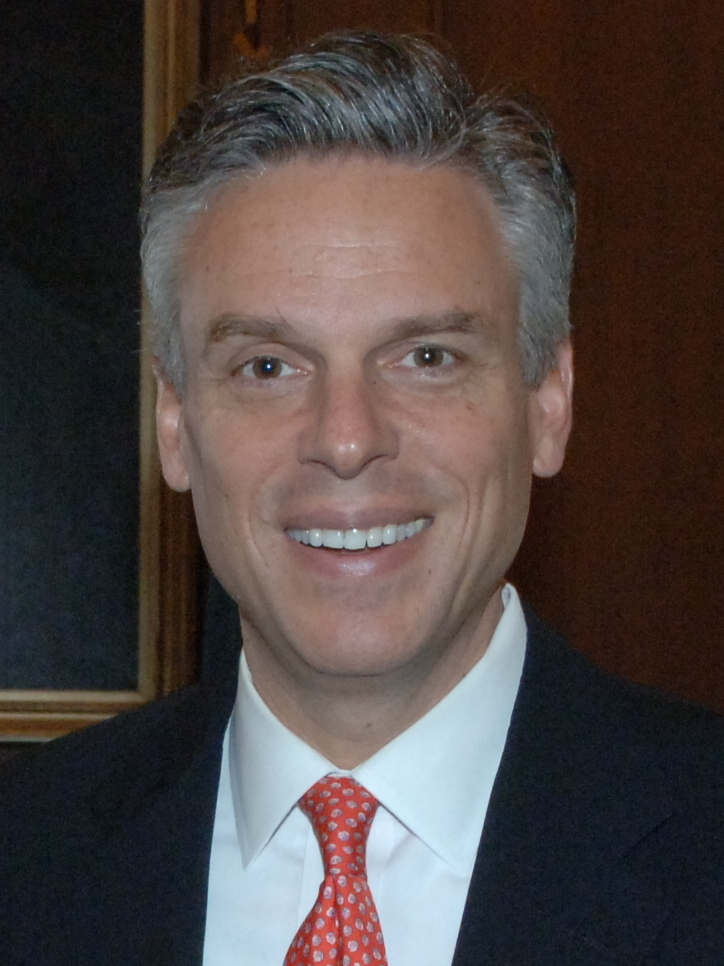

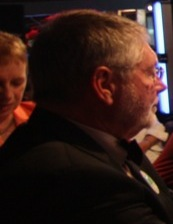
Nominee	Jon Huntsman Jr.	Bob Springmeyer
Party	Republican	Democratic
Running mate	Gary Herbert	Josie Valdez
Popular vote	734,049	186,503
Percentage	77.63%	19.72%
- County results Huntsman: 60–70% 70–80% 80–90%
Governor before election
Jon Huntsman Jr.
Republican
Elected Governor
Jon Huntsman Jr.
Republican

The 2008 Utah gubernatorial election was held on November 4, 2008. The deadline to file for the primary was June 24, 2008. Incumbent Republican governor Jon Huntsman Jr. won re-election in a landslide, defeating Democratic nominee Bob Springmeyer and Libertarian nominee Dell Schanze.

== Candidates ==
=== Republican Party ===
- Jon Huntsman, Jr., incumbent governor

=== Democratic Party ===
- Bob Springmeyer, businessman

=== Libertarian Party ===
- Dell Schanze, businessman

== General election ==
=== Predictions ===
Source	Ranking	As of
The Cook Political Report	Safe R	October 16, 2008
Rothenberg Political Report	Safe R	November 2, 2008
Sabato's Crystal Ball	Safe R	November 3, 2008
Real Clear Politics	Safe R	November 4, 2008

=== Polling ===
Source	Date	Jon Huntsman Jr. (R)	Bob Springmeyer (D)
Dan Jones/Deseret News	September 8–11, 2008	77%	13%
Mason-Dixon/Salt Lake Tribune	August 13–15, 2008	73%	9%
Rasmussen Reports	June 25, 2008	66%	19%

=== Results ===
2008 Utah gubernatorial election
Party	Candidate	Votes	%	±%
Republican	Jon Huntsman Jr. (incumbent)	735,049	77.63%	+19.89%
Democratic	Bob Springmeyer	186,503	19.72%	−21.62%
Libertarian	Dell Schanze	24,820	2.62%	
Write-in	Bob Doughton	153	0.02%	
Total votes		945,525	100.00%	
Majority		547,546	57.91%	
Republican hold		Swing	+41.51%	

=== Results by county ===
County	Jon Huntsman Republican		Bob Springmeyer Democratic		Dell Schanze Libertarian		Margin		Total votes cast
County	#	%	#	%	#	%	#	%	Total votes cast
Beaver	2,038	82.34%	386	15.60%	51	2.06%	1,652	66.75%	2,475
Box Elder	16,619	87.98%	1,681	8.90%	589	3.12%	14,938	79.08%	18,889
Cache	34,909	85.30%	4,967	12.14%	1,045	2.55%	29,942	73.16%	40,924 (Note: Includes 3 write-in votes)
Carbon	4,943	65.14%	2,412	31.79%	233	3.07%	2,531	33.36%	7,588
Daggett	357	80.77%	79	17.87%	6	1.36%	278	62.90%	442
Davis	90,998	82.82%	16,103	14.66%	2,724	2.48%	74,895	68.16%	109,879 (Note: Includes 54 write-in votes)
Duchesne	4,961	87.30%	586	10.31%	136	2.39%	4,375	76.98%	5,683
Emery	3,418	77.70%	854	19.41%	127	2.89%	2,564	58.29%	4,399
Garfield	1,834	85.66%	251	11.72%	56	2.62%	1,583	73.94%	2,141
Grand	2,505	63.43%	1,295	32.79%	149	3.77%	1,210	30.64%	3,949
Iron	14,060	86.47%	1,702	10.47%	498	3.06%	12,358	76.00%	16,260
Juab	2,464	77.93%	542	17.14%	156	4.93%	1,922	60.78%	3,162
Kane	2,447	78.83%	575	18.52%	82	2.64%	1,872	60.31%	3,104
Millard	3,743	80.08%	676	14.46%	255	5.46%	3,067	65.62%	4,674
Morgan	3,615	87.91%	374	9.10%	123	2.99%	3,241	78.82%	4,112
Piute	662	84.55%	95	12.13%	26	3.32%	567	72.41%	783
Rich	878	89.05%	89	9.03%	19	1.93%	789	80.02%	986
Salt Lake	250,311	69.02%	103,290	28.48%	8,978	2.48%	147,021	40.54%	362,663 (Note: Includes 84 write-in votes)
San Juan	3,050	60.18%	1,879	37.08%	139	2.74%	1,171	23.11%	5,068
Sanpete	7,125	82.41%	1,182	13.67%	339	3.92%	5,943	68.74%	8,646
Sevier	6,488	82.90%	1,074	13.72%	264	3.37%	5,414	69.18%	7,826
Summit	11,771	70.87%	4,469	26.91%	369	2.22%	7,302	43.96%	16,609
Tooele	13,442	77.91%	3,276	18.99%	536	3.11%	10,166	58.92%	17,254
Uintah	8,697	87.42%	995	10.00%	257	2.58%	7,702	77.41%	9,949
Utah	136,753	87.09%	15,801	10.06%	4,464	2.84%	120,952	77.02%	157,030 (Note: Includes 12 write-in votes)
Wasatch	6,834	81.13%	1,407	16.70%	182	2.16%	5,427	64.43%	8,423
Washington	41,254	84.47%	6,445	13.20%	1,142	2.34%	34,809	71.27%	48,841
Wayne	1,018	79.41%	234	18.25%	30	2.34%	784	61.15%	1,282
Weber	56,855	78.44%	13,784	19.02%	1,845	2.55%	43,071	59.42%	72,484
Total	734,049	77,63%	186,503	19.72%	24,820	2.62%	547,546	57.91%	945,525

==== Counties that flipped from Democratic to Republican ====
- Carbon (largest municipality: Price)
- Grand (largest municipality: Moab)
- Salt Lake (largest city: Salt Lake City)
- Summit (largest city: Park City)
