= Aimee Winder Newton =

American politician

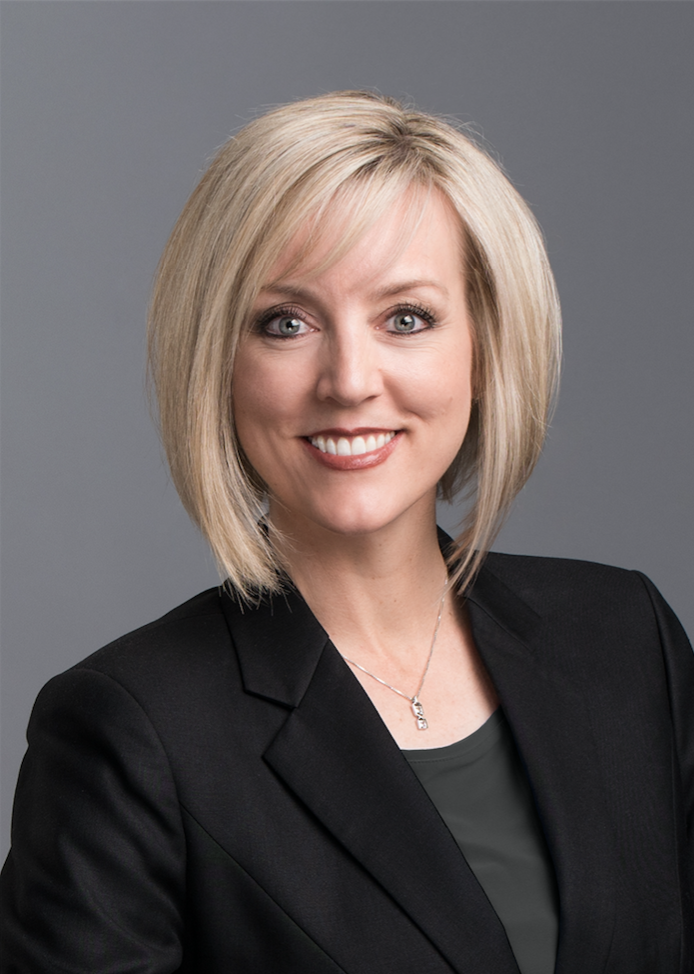

Member of the Salt Lake County Council from the 3rd district
- Incumbent
- Assumed office January 14, 2014
- Preceded by: David Wilde

Personal details
- Born: May 10, 1974 (age 52) West Valley City, Utah, United States
- Party: Republican
- Spouse: Matthew T. Newton
- Children: 4
- Education: University of Utah

Aimee Winder Newton is an American politician and member of the Salt Lake County Council representing the 3rd district. On October 23, 2019, Winder Newton announced her candidacy for Governor of Utah in 2020.

== Political career ==
Winder Newton was elected to the Salt Lake County Council with 78% of the vote. She is the first female Republican to serve on the Salt Lake County Council and was elected to chair the Council in 2018 and 2023.

While Winder Newton led the Council in 2018, the Council passed a balanced budget with no tax increase with an emphasis on public safety. During her time on the council, Winder Newton has focused on breaking the cycle of inter-generational poverty, improving the criminal justice system and advocating for mental health resources. In 2019 Winder Newton rejected a proposal by her colleagues to give points in the County bidding process for women and minority-owned businesses stating "that no groups should receive an unfair advantage or disadvantage based on their skin color or gender." In 2019, she co-sponsored a bill with Democratic Councilman Arlyn Bradshaw, who is gay, to urge Utah State Legislature to ban conversion therapy, which passed the Council unanimously.

Long active in Republican politics, Winder Newton was involved with the College Republicans and served as a delegate to the 2016 Republican National Convention from Utah.

In her campaign for Utah Governor, Winder Newton said the top issues she will look at include high quality education, supporting a stronger and more nimble workforce, as well as growth related issues such as air quality, housing affordability, adequate water supply, and enhanced infrastructure.

== Personal life ==
Winder Newton was born in Granger, the daughter of Sherri (Jepson) and Kent Winder. Her family has a long history of civic involvement. Winder Newton's great-grandfather and father both served as Granger-Hunter Improvement District trustees, with her father also being elected to Taylorsville's first city council.

Her mother, who died in 2011, worked for Utah Governor Jon Huntsman and was U.S. Rep. Jason Chaffetz’s office manager in West Jordan. The eldest of five children, her youngest brother, Isaac, died in 2014. Another brother, Mike Winder, was mayor of West Valley City and was a member of the Utah House of Representatives from 2017 to 2022. Winder Newton married her husband Matt in 1993 and has four children.

== Education and career ==
She graduated from Taylorsville High School, Ricks College, and the University of Utah, where she received a BS in Mass Communications. Winder Newton grew a mortgage business and started the communications firm Figco, Inc. She is the founder of Citizens Supporting a Strong Taylorsville, and was the first director of communications for Taylorsville City. Winder Newton served as vice-chair for the Taylorsville Economic Development committee, the public-relations and advertising director of the Taylorsville Incorporation Committee, eight years as a planning commissioner, and five years on the Granite School District Community Council.

In 2022, Winder Newton was appointed by Governor Spencer J. Cox to serve as a senior advisor and director of the newly formed state Office of Families. In this position she advises the governor on policy to strengthen families and strive for better outcomes for children.
