= Greg Hughes =

American politician (born 1969)

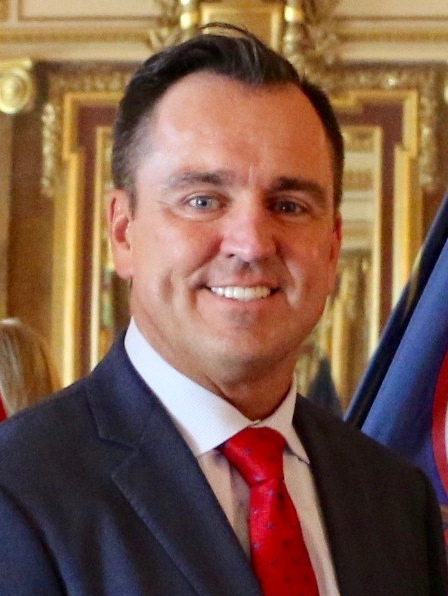

Speaker of the Utah House of Representatives
- In office January 26, 2015 – December 31, 2018
- Preceded by: Becky Lockhart
- Succeeded by: Brad Wilson

Member of the Utah House of Representatives from the 51st district
- In office January 1, 2003 – December 31, 2018
- Preceded by: John Swallow
- Succeeded by: Jeff Stenquist

Personal details
- Born: Gregory Holden Hughes; October 13, 1969 (age 56) Pittsburgh, Pennsylvania, U.S.
- Party: Republican
- Education: Utah Valley University (AA); Brigham Young University

Gregory Holden Hughes (born October 13, 1969) is an American politician who served as a member of the Utah House of Representatives representing District 51 from January 1, 2003 through December 31, 2018. Hughes is the former Speaker of the House for the House of Representatives in the state of Utah. He announced that he would not be seeking reelection as Speaker of the House or as a representative in 2018. In 2020, Hughes ran for the office of Governor of Utah. Spencer Cox became the Republican nominee after the Republican primary vote. Hughes ran to replace retiring U.S. Congressman Chris Stewart in the 2023 Utah 2nd congressional district special election, losing the primary to Celeste Maloy.

== Early life and education ==
Born in Pittsburgh, Pennsylvania, Hughes never knew his father and was brought up by a single mother who sold cemetery plots on commission. She joined the Church of Jesus Christ of Latter-day Saints and married when Hughes was five, but the marriage ended in divorce by the time he was ten. At age 16, Hughes was in a car accident with friends, and subsequently used a wheelchair for a year.

He later worked as a bellhop in an upscale Pittsburgh hotel and then on the 1988 presidential campaign staff for George H. W. Bush. He served a full-time mission for The Church of Jesus Christ of Latter-day Saints in Australia and Papua New Guinea. Hughes earned an associate degree from Utah Valley State College (now Utah Valley University) and attended briefly Brigham Young University.

== Career ==
When District 51 Republican representative John Swallow ran for Congress and left the seat open, Hughes ran in the June 25, 2002 Republican primary and won with 1,047 votes (53%) and was unopposed for the November 5, 2002 general election, winning with 7,224 votes.

Hughes was unopposed in the 2004 and 2006 elections. In 2008, Hughes faced Margaret Bird in the Republican primary. Hughes was unopposed in the 2010 and 2012 elections before facing a primary challenger again in 2014.

From 2015 to 2018, Hughes served as Speaker of the Utah House of Representatives. He opted not to run for re-election in 2018. In January 2020, Hughes announced his candidacy for the 2020 Utah gubernatorial election. In April 2020, Hughes named Washington County Commissioner, Victor Iverson, as his running mate. In the Republican primary, Hughes faced former governor and diplomat Jon Huntsman Jr., incumbent lieutenant governor Spencer Cox, and former chair of the Utah Republican Party, Thomas Wright. After placing third behind Huntsman and Cox, Hughes conceded the race before a winner was announced.

=== Controversy ===
Conflict of interest concerns were raised over Hughes' business relationship with developer Kevin Garn while Hughes was serving as the Utah Transit Authority (UTA) board chairman. In April 2011, Greg Hughes and former House Majority Leader Kevin Garn formed a company together to construct an apartment building on land that Hughes owned in downtown Salt Lake City. Several months later, UTA chose a separate company owned by Garn to develop several transit-oriented developments. Hughes was the UTA board chairman at that time, and did not disclose a business relationship with Garn.

In 2018, The Salt Lake Tribune reported on a conflict-of-interest controversy as part of on ongoing federal probe into the Utah Transit Authority (UTA). Questions were raised in 2016 surrounding the company "Urban Chase Property Management", which is co-owned by Hughes, that would use surplus property owned by UTA. Newly-released documents from 2016 show that UTA believed that "Greg Hughes' proposed participation in this project, even if it is just as an investor, appears to be a conflict of interest." Hughes had no comment due to an ongoing federal investigation, but documents indicate Hughes "did not know the project was related to UTA."

In June 2018, a conflict-of-interest caused Greg Hughes to step down from his self-appointed position on the board of the Utah Inland Port Authority after it was discovered that he was registered with at least eight companies owning land within five miles of the inland port. Hughes said he had been unaware that his land was within the disqualification boundary.

== Personal life ==
He and his wife, Krista, live in Draper, Utah with their three kids. Hughes is a self-employed property manager and developer, and has served on the board of the Utah Transit Authority.

Political offices
Preceded by Becky Lockhart	Speaker of the Utah House of Representatives; 2015–2018	Succeeded by Brad Wilson
