= Spencer Cox =

Governor of Utah since 2021

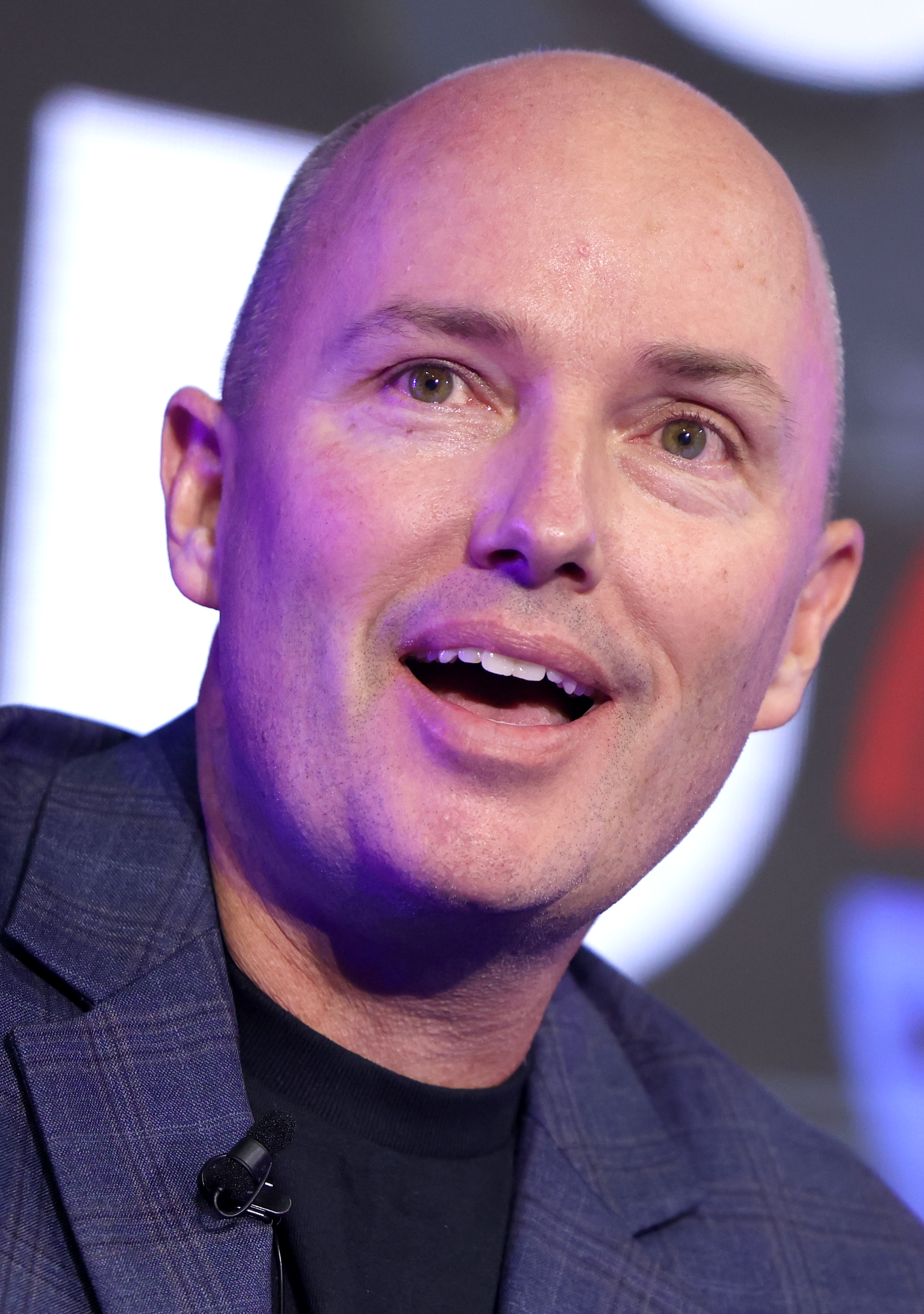
- Cox in 2025

18th Governor of Utah
- Incumbent
- Assumed office January 4, 2021
- Lieutenant: Deidre Henderson
- Preceded by: Gary Herbert

Chair of the National Governors Association
- In office July 14, 2023 – July 12, 2024
- Preceded by: Phil Murphy
- Succeeded by: Jared Polis

8th Lieutenant Governor of Utah
- In office October 16, 2013 – January 4, 2021
- Governor: Gary Herbert
- Preceded by: Greg Bell
- Succeeded by: Deidre Henderson

Member of the Utah House of Representatives from the 58th district
- In office January 1, 2013 – October 16, 2013
- Preceded by: Stephen Sandstrom
- Succeeded by: Jon Cox

Personal details
- Born: Spencer James Cox; July 11, 1975 (age 51) Mount Pleasant, Utah, U.S.
- Party: Republican
- Spouse: Abby Palmer (m. 1996)
- Children: 4
- Education: Snow College (AA); Utah State University (BA); Washington and Lee University (JD)
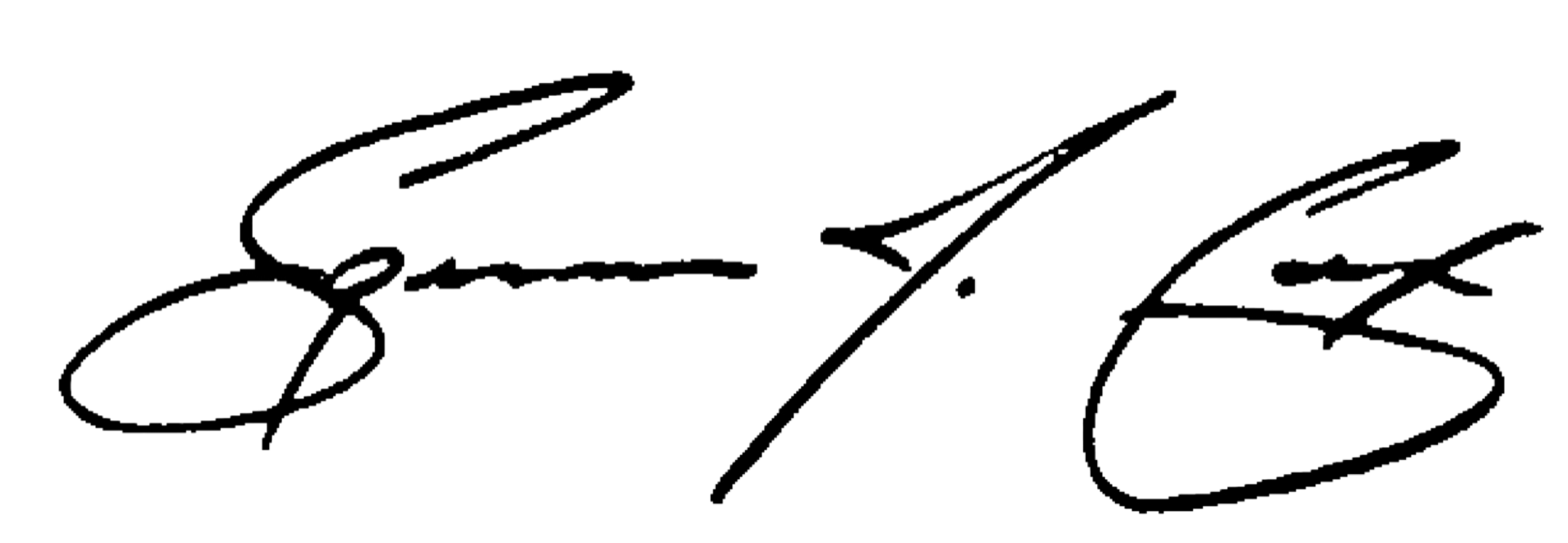
- Signature
- Website: Office website Campaign website
- Spencer Cox's voice Spencer Cox speaks to service members at Camp Williams. Recorded September 24, 2022

Spencer James Cox (born July 11, 1975) is an American lawyer and politician serving since 2021 as the 18th governor of Utah. A member of the Republican Party, he served from 2013 to 2021 as the eighth lieutenant governor of Utah. In Fairview, Utah, where Cox lives and was raised, he was elected to the city council in 2004 and then as mayor in 2005. In 2008, he was elected as a Sanpete County commissioner.

He was elected to the Utah House of Representatives in 2012. In October 2013, Governor Gary Herbert appointed Cox to replace Greg Bell as lieutenant governor; he was confirmed unanimously by the Utah State Senate. Cox was elected to the lieutenant governorship as Herbert's running mate in 2016 and was elected governor in 2020. He was reelected in 2024.

== Early life and education ==
Cox was born on July 11, 1975, in Mount Pleasant, Utah. He grew up in the nearby town of Fairview and graduated from North Sanpete High School in Mount Pleasant. He enrolled at Snow College in Ephraim, taking two years off to serve a full-time mission for the Church of Jesus Christ of Latter-day Saints in Mexico. After his mission, he returned to Snow and married his high-school sweetheart, Abby, who also graduated from Snow College. After graduating with an associate's degree, he attended Utah State University (USU) in Logan, Utah, graduating in 1998 with a Bachelor of Arts in political science.

Cox was accepted to Harvard Law School but instead chose to attend the Washington and Lee University School of Law. He was a member of the Washington and Lee Law Review, and graduated in 2001 with a Juris Doctor degree with honors.

== Career ==
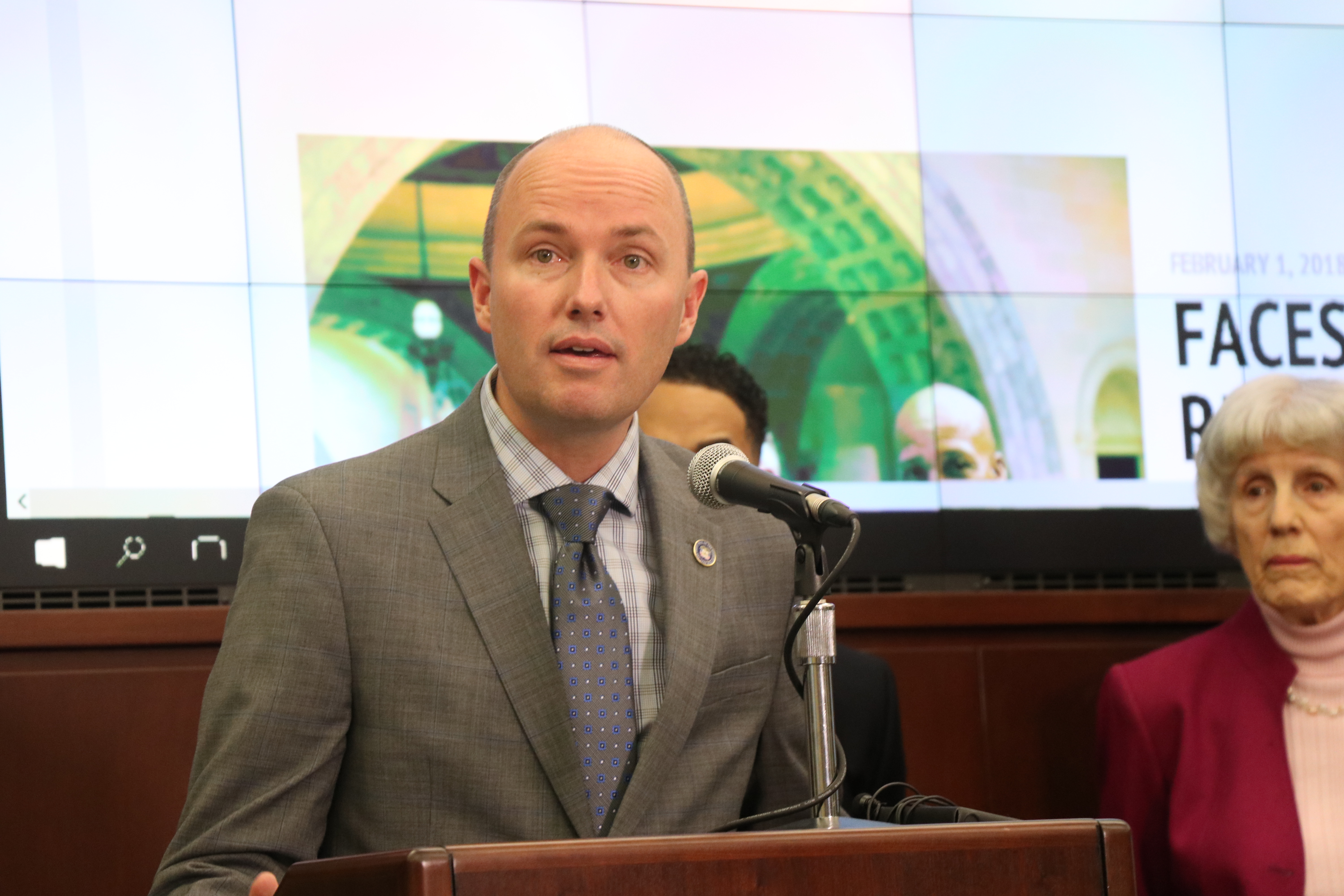
Spencer Cox in 2018

=== Early legal work ===
After graduating from law school, Cox was a law clerk to Judge Ted Stewart of the U.S. District Court for the District of Utah from 2001 to 2002. He then entered private practice as an associate at the Salt Lake City law firm Fabian & Clendenin (now Fabian VanCott). He returned to rural Utah and became a vice president of Centracom.

=== Political career ===
Cox was elected as a city councilor of Fairview, Utah in 2004, and mayor the next year. In 2008, he was elected as a Sanpete County commissioner. Cox was elected to the Utah House of Representatives in 2012 and became the first member to call for the impeachment of John Swallow, the attorney general of Utah, over violations of campaign finance laws. Cox and Lieutenant Governor Bell served as co-chairs of Governor Herbert's Rural Partnership Board.

=== Lieutenant governor of Utah ===
In October 2013, Herbert selected Cox to succeed Bell as lieutenant governor following Bell's resignation. The Utah Senate's Government Operations Confirmation Committee unanimously approved his nomination on October 15. The next day, the full Utah Senate confirmed him unanimously, and he was sworn in. As lieutenant governor, Cox produced a report on Swallow's financial interests, demonstrating that Swallow had failed to properly disclose all of his income and business interests. Swallow resigned before the report's release. In the 2016 Utah gubernatorial election, Cox was elected to a full term as lieutenant governor as Herbert's running mate.

== Governor of Utah ==
Cox speaks on the assassination of conservative activist Charlie Kirk; September 10, 2025.

On May 14, 2019, after Herbert announced that he would not seek reelection, Cox announced his candidacy for the Republican nomination for governor of Utah in 2020. With 36% of the vote in the primary, he defeated former governor Jon Huntsman Jr., former Utah GOP chair Thomas Wright, and former Utah House speaker Greg Hughes. In the general election, Cox defeated the Democratic nominee, Chris Peterson, 63% to 30%. In a break with tradition, Cox's January 4, 2021 inauguration (with precautions against the COVID-19 pandemic) was held at the Tuacahn Center for the Arts in Ivins, Utah, a small town in Washington County. The stated purpose of this move was to express Cox's desire to be governor for the entire state as opposed to focusing on the Wasatch Front region. Within days of his inauguration, he opened an office on Southern Utah University's Cedar City campus.

Cox said early on that increasing the speed of the state's vaccine distribution was his administration's top priority. As of April 2021, Utah had administered more than 85% of the doses it had received, according to CDC data. In 2020, during the COVID-19 pandemic in Utah, Cox faced criticism for the state's decision to award millions of dollars in no-bid contracts in the early days of the crisis and for the controversial purchase of an anti-malaria drug as a possible treatment for COVID-19. Cox says he had no role in approving the $800,000 hydroxychloroquine order, which was later canceled. In July 2022, Cox was elected vice chair of the National Governors Association, succeeding New Jersey governor Phil Murphy, who was voted chair. In March 2023, Cox signed two bills into law, including the Utah Social Media Regulation Act, which bans social media platforms, such as TikTok, Instagram, and Snapchat, from allowing minors to create accounts without parental consent and blocks children's access during certain hours.

Cox designated September 10, 2026, "Charlie Kirk Day" in the state to mark the anniversary of Kirk's death.

=== Vetoes ===
Cox has vetoed five bills as of 2022, all of which were Republican-backed (Republicans have supermajorities in both of Utah's state legislative chambers). His first veto was of a bill sponsored by his brother-in-law, Senator Mike McKell, that sought to regulate how social media platforms moderate content. Cox also vetoed Senate Bill 187: Local Education Agency Policies Amendments, sponsored by Ronald Winterton; Senate Bill 39: Hemp Regulation Amendments, sponsored by David Hinkins; and House Bill 98: Local Government Building Regulation Amendments, sponsored by Paul Ray. In March 2022, Cox vetoed House Bill 11: Student Eligibility in Interscholastic Activities, sponsored by Kera Birkeland, which aimed to prevent transgender youth athletes from participating in women's sports. Cox noted that, of Utah's 75,000 student athletes, only four were transgender and only one competed in women's sports. The legislature overrode his veto.

== Political positions ==
Cox is frequently considered a moderate Republican. In October 2015, Cox endorsed Marco Rubio in the 2016 Republican presidential primary. After Rubio withdrew, Cox endorsed Ted Cruz in March 2016. Cox said of Donald Trump's 2016 campaign that Trump "does not represent neither goodness nor kindness." He said he did not vote for Hillary Clinton or Trump in the 2016 presidential election.

Cox voted for a write-in candidate in the 2020 presidential election. After the 2021 United States Capitol attack, Cox said Trump was responsible for inciting the violence and called on him to resign. Cox endorsed Trump in July 2024 for the 2024 presidential election after an attempted assassination against Trump. He wrote that he believed that God saved Trump in assassination attempt and that only Trump could unify and save the country.

In April 2026, after public pushback against plans for a data center to be built in Utah, Cox said that every state had an obligation to allow for the construction of data centers.

=== Abortion ===
Cox describes himself as "pro-life". He opposes abortion except in cases of rape, incest, or danger to the life of the mother. Cox supported the overturning of Roe v. Wade in June 2022. In March 2023, Cox signed a bill banning abortion clinics from operating in Utah and requiring abortions to be performed in a hospital. The law was temporarily blocked by district court judge Andrew H. Stone a day before it was to take effect in May 2023.

=== Environment ===
Cox opposes the use of the Antiquities Act to create national monuments, saying that he believes monument designations hurt the landscapes they are meant to protect. He has expressed opposition to the restored boundaries of Bears Ears National Monument and Grand Staircase–Escalante National Monument, and to the creation of Baaj Nwaavjo I'tah Kukveni – Ancestral Footprints of the Grand Canyon National Monument.

=== Guns ===
In February 2021, Cox signed a constitutional carry bill to allow individuals to carry a firearm in public without a permit. At a June 2022 press conference, Cox said he was open to discussing with the legislature a red flag law to permit a state court to order the temporary seizure of firearms from any person believed to present a danger.

=== Health ===
On March 28, 2025, Cox signed into law a bill introduced by Republican state lawmaker Stephanie Gricius banning from Utah's public water the addition of fluoride, a mineral added to public water since 1945 to prevent cavities, making Utah the first U.S. state to ban water fluoridation. Major medical associations and public health groups, such as the American Academy of Pediatrics, the American Dental Association, and the Centers for Disease Control and Prevention, support water fluoridation.

=== LGBT rights ===
On June 13, 2016, Cox spoke at a vigil in Salt Lake City honoring those who died in the Orlando nightclub shooting the day before. He apologized for mistreating schoolmates and his lack of support for the LGBT community, and directed part of his speech at straight people.

In March 2022, Cox vetoed HB11, which would ban transgender youth from participating in high school sports. The legislature overrode his veto. On June 1, 2022, Cox issued an official proclamation recognizing June as LGBTQ+ Pride Month and encouraged Utahns to be more welcoming and accepting of the LGBTQ community. On January 28, 2023, Cox signed Senate Bill 16, which bans gender-affirming surgery for patients under 18. On March 22, 2023, Cox signed HB228, codifying Utah's existing conversion therapy ban, previously approved through a 2020 administrative rule.

In June 2024, Cox said his earlier declarations of Pride Month had created "division and hurt". On August 5, 2024, he and other state leaders shared unconfirmed reports that Olympic boxer Imane Khelif was genetically male. At the time of these statements, Khelif was qualified as a woman by the International Olympic Committee but had been disqualified by the Russian-led International Boxing Association. The results of any genetic or other sex-related tests are confidential under medical privacy rules.

Cox declared June 2026 "Fidelity Month", an initiative centered on the "principles of God, marriage, family, country and community".

== Personal life ==
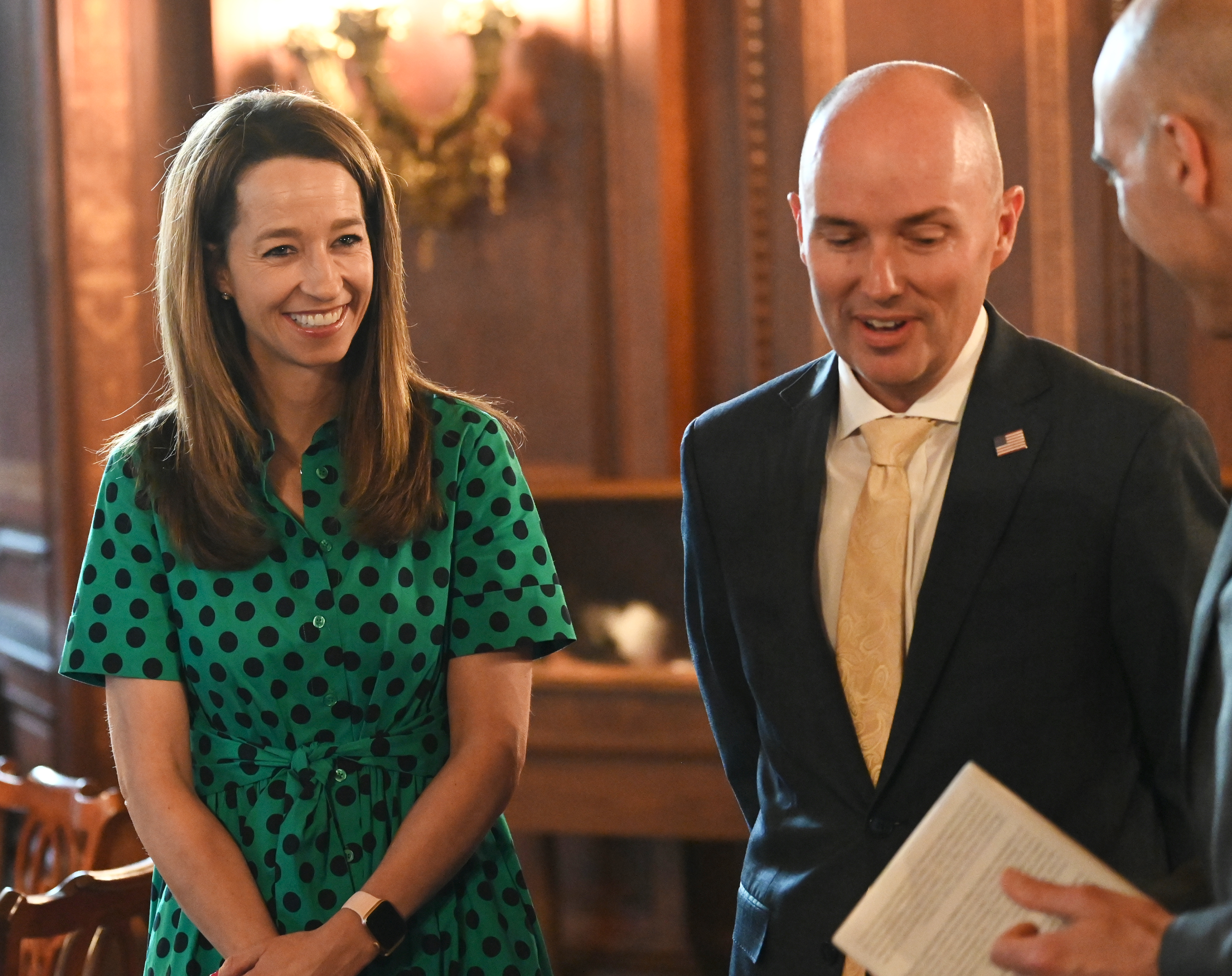
Cox with his wife Abby in 2024

Cox is the oldest of eight children and grew up on a farm in Fairview. He and his wife, Abby, have four children and live on their family farm in Fairview. His father, Eddie, served on the Utah Transportation Commission and was also a Sanpete County commissioner.

Cox plays bass guitar in a garage band. His brother-in-law, Travis Osmond, the son of Merrill Osmond, taught him to play bass. State Senator Mike McKell is also a brother-in-law. Cox's fourth cousin, Jon Cox, succeeded him in the Utah House of Representatives.

Cox is a fan of the band The Killers and in 2018 recorded a cover of their song "Read My Mind" with his band. In 2024, The Killers' lead singer Brandon Flowers performed at a fundraiser for Cox's campaign.

== Electoral history ==
2016 Utah gubernatorial election
Party	Candidate	Votes	%	±%
Republican	Gary Herbert/Spencer Cox (incumbent)	750,850	66.74%	−1.67%
Democratic	Mike Weinholtz/Kim Bowman	323,349	28.74%	+1.16%
Libertarian	Brian Kamerath/Barry Short	34,827	3.10%	+0.85%
Independent American	Superdell Schanze/Gregory Duerden	15,912	1.41%	N/A
Independent	L.S. Brown (write-in)	97	0.01%	N/A
Total votes		1,125,035	100.0%	N/A
Republican hold				

2020 Republican gubernatorial primary
Party	Candidate	Votes	%
Republican	Spencer Cox	190,565	36.15%
Republican	Jon Huntsman Jr.	184,246	34.95%
Republican	Greg Hughes	110,835	21.02%
Republican	Thomas Wright	41,532	7.88%
Total votes		527,178	100.00%

2020 Utah gubernatorial election
Party	Candidate	Votes	%	±%
Republican	Spencer Cox	918,754	62.98%	−3.76%
Democratic	Christopher Peterson	442,754	30.35%	+1.61%
Libertarian	Daniel Cottam	51,393	3.52%	+0.42%
Independent American	Gregory Duerden	25,810	1.77%	+0.36%
Write-in		20,167	1.38%	+1.37%
Total votes		1,458,878	100.00%	
Republican hold				

2024 Utah gubernatorial election
Party	Candidate	Votes	%	±%
Republican	Spencer Cox (incumbent); Deidre Henderson (incumbent)	781,431	52.89%	−10.09
Democratic	Brian King; Rebekah Cummings	420,514	28.63%	−1.72
Write-In	Phil Lyman; Natalie Clawson	200,551	13.57%	N/A
Libertarian	J. Robert Latham; Barry Evan Short	41,164	2.79%	−0.73
Independent American	Tommy Williams; Archie Williams	27,480	1.86%	+0.09
Independent	Tom Tomeny; William Lansing Taylor	5,792	0.39%	N/A
Write-In	Charlie Tautuaa; Sylvia Miera Fisk	525	0.04%	N/A
Total votes		1,477,457	100.00%	
Republican hold				

Utah House of Representatives
Preceded by Stephen Sandstrom	Member of the Utah House of Representatives from the 58th district 2013	Succeeded by Jon Cox
Political offices
Preceded by Greg Bell	Lieutenant Governor of Utah; 2013–2021	Succeeded by Deidre Henderson
Preceded by Gary Herbert	Governor of Utah; 2021–present	Incumbent
Preceded by Phil Murphy	Chair of the National Governors Association; 2023–2024	Succeeded by Jared Polis
Party political offices
Preceded by Greg Bell	Republican nominee for Lieutenant Governor of Utah; 2016	Succeeded by Deidre Henderson
Preceded by Gary Herbert	Republican nominee for Governor of Utah; 2020, 2024	Most recent
U.S. order of precedence (ceremonial)
Preceded by JD Vance as Vice President	Order of precedence of the United States; Within Utah	Succeeded by Mayor of city in which event is held
Preceded by JD Vance as Vice President	Order of precedence of the United States; Within Utah	Succeeded by Otherwise Mike Johnson as Speaker of the House
Preceded by Mark Gordon as Governor of Wyoming	Order of precedence of the United States; Outside Utah	Succeeded by Kevin Stitt as Governor of Oklahoma
