= Christopher Peterson (law professor) =

American legal scholar (born 1975)

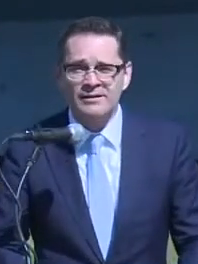
- Peterson in 2023

Personal details
- Born: Christopher Lewis Peterson; 1975 (age 50–51) West Valley City, Utah, U.S.
- Party: Democratic
- Spouse: Tera Peterson
- Children: 3
- Education: University of Utah (BA, BS, JD)
- Awards: Office of the Secretary of Defense Award for Excellence (2015); Order of the Coif (2001)
- Website: Campaign website

Christopher Lewis Peterson (born 1975) is an American attorney, legal scholar, and political candidate working as the John J. Flynn Endowed Professor of Law at the University of Utah S.J. Quinney College of Law. Peterson was the Democratic nominee for the 2020 Utah gubernatorial election, losing to Republican lieutenant governor Spencer Cox. Peterson specializes in consumer protection law. He served as a finance official for the Obama administration, where he focused on protecting United States Armed Forces members from predatory lending. On July 27, 2026, it was announced that Peterson would become the Director of the New Jersey Division of Consumer Affairs.

== Early life and education ==
Born and raised in West Valley City, Utah, Peterson attended public schools. He earned a Bachelor of Arts degree and Juris Doctor from the University of Utah.

== Career ==
After graduating from law school, Peterson worked in Wyoming, Washington, D.C., and Florida before returning as a professor at his alma mater. In 2012–2016 he was on leave to work in Washington, D.C., where he worked in various roles including as a Special Advisor in the Office of the Director at the Consumer Financial Protection Bureau (CFPB), in the Office of Legal Policy for Personnel and Readiness in the United States Department of Defense, and as senior counsel for enforcement policy and strategy in the CFPB's Office of Enforcement.

In 2018, he was elected fellow of the American College of Consumer Financial Lawyers.

=== Utah's 2020 gubernatorial election ===
Peterson announced his candidacy for governor of Utah on March 4, 2020. In April his campaign secured 88.4 percent of the vote during the Democratic Primary Convention. On April 20 he announced Karina Brown, a Cache County resident as his running mate for Lieutenant governor. Brown is a healthcare and Medicaid expansion advocate and was a signatory on Proposition 3 to expand healthcare coverage to 150,000 low income Utahns. Voters approved Proposition 3 in 2018, but it was later replaced by elected state leaders.

During the COVID-19 pandemic in Utah Peterson initially supported leaving face mask mandates to local governments until cases in Utah spiked, before urging for a statewide mandate. According to his campaign website Peterson supports increased funding for education in Utah including higher teacher compensation and more funds for supplies. He also supports expanding access to affordable health care, safeguarding consumer rights, and stopping gerrymandering. His campaign website also states he wants to improve air quality in Utah, which at times has been poorest in the nation.

Peterson encouraged Republican candidate Spencer Cox to public debates as early as July, but the Cox campaign ignored or refused requests stating it was too early.

== Personal life ==
He lives in Salt Lake City and is married to Tera Peterson who is also a practicing attorney. They have three children.

Party political offices
Preceded by Mike Weinholtz	Democratic nominee for Governor of Utah; 2020	Succeeded by Brian King
