= Jon Huntsman Jr. =

American politician (born 1960)

Jon Huntsman
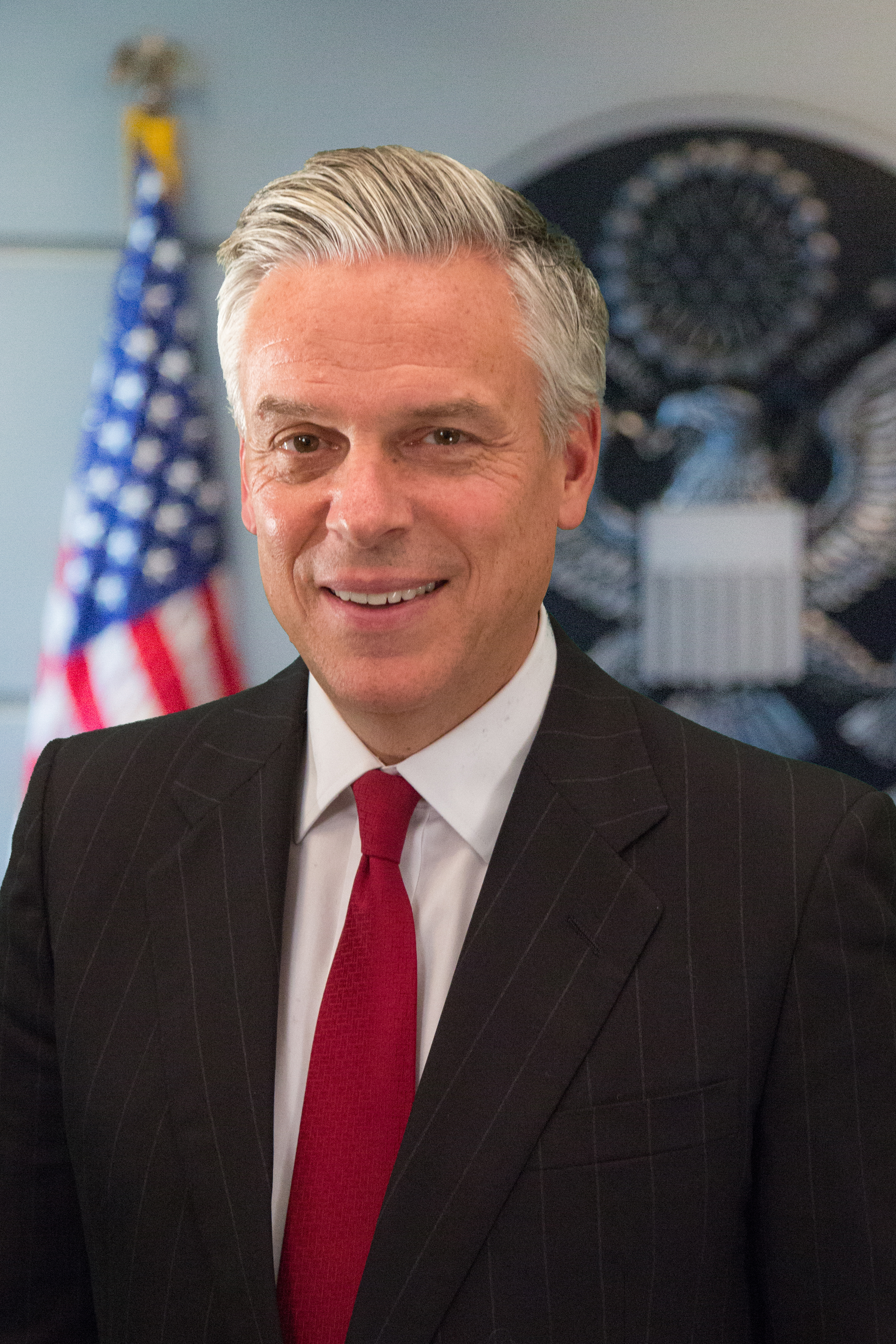
- Official portrait, 2018

9th United States Ambassador to Russia
- In office October 3, 2017 – October 3, 2019
- President: Donald Trump
- Preceded by: John F. Tefft
- Succeeded by: John Sullivan

9th United States Ambassador to China
- In office August 28, 2009 – April 28, 2011
- President: Barack Obama
- Preceded by: Clark T. Randt Jr.
- Succeeded by: Gary Locke

16th Governor of Utah
- In office January 3, 2005 – August 11, 2009
- Lieutenant: Gary Herbert
- Preceded by: Olene Walker
- Succeeded by: Gary Herbert

United States Deputy Trade Representative
- In office August 3, 2001 – April 2, 2003
- President: George W. Bush
- Preceded by: Susan Esserman
- Succeeded by: Josette Sheeran

United States Ambassador to Singapore
- In office September 22, 1992 – June 15, 1993
- President: George H. W. Bush; Bill Clinton
- Preceded by: Robert D. Orr
- Succeeded by: Ralph L. Boyce

Personal details
- Born: Jon Meade Huntsman Jr. March 26, 1960 (age 66) Redwood City, California, U.S.
- Party: Republican
- Spouse: Mary Cooper (m. 1983)
- Children: 7, including Abby
- Parent: Jon Huntsman Sr. (father)
- Relatives: Peter R. Huntsman (brother)
- Education: University of Pennsylvania (BA)

Jon Meade Huntsman Jr. (born March 26, 1960) is an American politician, businessman, and diplomat who served as the 16th governor of Utah from 2005 to 2009. Huntsman is a member of the Republican Party. Huntsman has served three times as an ambassador of the United States: 1992–1993 as ambassador to Singapore, 2009–2011 as ambassador to China, and 2017–2019 as ambassador to Russia.

Huntsman served in every presidential administration from the presidency of Ronald Reagan to the first Donald Trump administration. He began his career as a White House staff assistant for Ronald Reagan, and was appointed deputy assistant secretary of commerce and U.S. ambassador to Singapore by George H. W. Bush. Later as deputy U.S. trade representative under George W. Bush, he launched global trade negotiations in Doha in 2001 and guided the accession of China into the World Trade Organization. He was CEO of Huntsman Family Holdings, a private entity which held the family's stock in Huntsman Corporation. He was a board member of Huntsman Corporation, and chaired the Huntsman Cancer Foundation. Huntsman is the only American ambassador to have served in both Russia and China, having been the U.S. ambassador to China under Barack Obama from 2009 to 2011 and as the U.S. ambassador to Russia under Donald Trump from 2017 to 2019.

While governor of Utah, Huntsman was named chair of the Western Governors Association and joined the executive committee of the National Governors Association. Under his leadership, Utah was named the best-managed state in America by the Pew Center on the States. During his tenure, Huntsman was one of the most popular governors in the country, and won reelection in a landslide in 2008, winning every single county. He left office with approval ratings over 80 percent and was succeeded by Lieutenant Governor Gary Herbert. He was an unsuccessful candidate for the 2012 Republican presidential nomination. He ran for governor again in 2020, but narrowly lost in the Republican primary to Lieutenant Governor Spencer Cox.

Huntsman is a No Labels National Co-chair, and in July 2023, appeared with US senator Joe Manchin as headliners for a No Labels Common Sense Agenda Town Hall in Manchester, New Hampshire. Huntsman is a member of the Defense Policy Board Advisory Committee, but in April 2025 he was dismissed along with the entire board by Defense Secretary Pete Hegseth.

== Early life and education ==
Jon Meade Huntsman Jr. was born on March 26, 1960. His father, Jon Huntsman Sr., was a business executive who later became a billionaire through the company he founded, the Huntsman Corporation, which achieved breakthrough success in the 1970s manufacturing generic styrofoam cartons for McDonald's and other fast food companies and by the 1990s was one of the largest petrochemical companies in the United States. His mother is Karen (née Haight) Huntsman, daughter of David B. Haight, an apostle in the Church of Jesus Christ of Latter-day Saints (LDS Church). Through his father, Huntsman is the great-great-great-grandson of early LDS Church leader Parley P. Pratt.

In 1975, Huntsman earned the rank of Eagle Scout, the highest rank of the Boy Scouts of America. He attended Highland High School in Salt Lake City but dropped out before graduating to perform as a keyboard player in a rock band. He later obtained a G.E.D. and enrolled at the University of Utah, where he became a member of the Sigma Chi fraternity like his father. He then studied Chinese at National Taiwan Normal University and served as a missionary for the LDS Church in Taiwan for two years before transferring to the University of Pennsylvania, where he graduated with a bachelor of arts in international politics in 1987.

== Political career ==
While Huntsman was visiting the White House in 1971 during his father's service as special assistant to U.S. president Richard Nixon, Henry Kissinger confided to the eleven-year-old that he was secretly traveling to China. Jon Huntsman Jr. worked as a White House staff assistant in Reagan administration in 1983. From 1987 to 1988, Huntsman and his family lived and worked in Taipei, Taiwan.

Huntsman and Enid Greene Mickelsen were co-directors of Reagan's campaign in Utah. During the 1988 presidential election, he was a state delegate at the 1988 Republican National Convention.

=== George H. W. Bush administration ===
Under President George H. W. Bush, Huntsman was deputy assistant secretary in the International Trade Administration from 1989 to 1990. He served as deputy assistant secretary of commerce for East Asian and Pacific Affairs, from 1990 to 1991.

In June 1992, Bush appointed Huntsman as U.S. ambassador to Singapore, and he was unanimously confirmed by the United States Senate in August. At 32 years old, he became the youngest U.S. Ambassador to serve in over 100 years.

=== George W. Bush administration ===
In January 2001, after George W. Bush took office as president, The Washington Post reported there was a strong possibility Huntsman would be appointed to be the new U.S. ambassador to China. In March, Huntsman reportedly turned down the nomination to be the U.S. Ambassador to Indonesia. On March 28, Bush appointed Huntsman to be one of two Deputy United States trade representatives in his administration; he served in this role from 2001 to 2003.

=== Governor of Utah ===
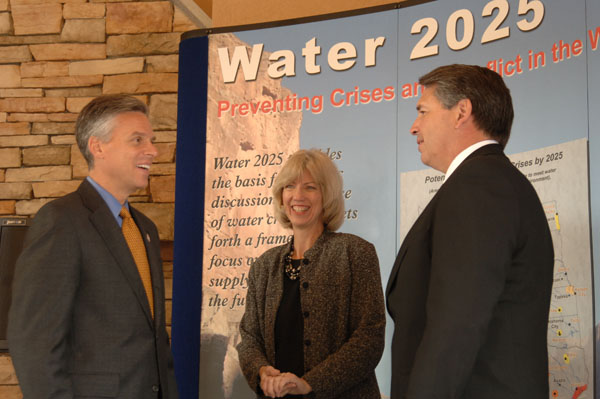
Huntsman with Secretary of the Interior Gale Norton, and Assistant Secretary for Water and Science Mark Limbaugh in October 2005.

In March 2003, Huntsman resigned his post in the Bush administration. In mid-August, three-term incumbent governor Mike Leavitt, who Huntsman strongly supported, decided not to run for re-election in order to become EPA administrator in the Bush administration. Shortly thereafter, Huntsman filed papers to run for Governor of Utah. In the June 2004 Republican primary, Huntsman defeated State Representative Nolan Karras 66–34%. In November 2004, Huntsman was elected with 58% of the vote, defeating Democratic Party nominee Scott Matheson Jr. In 2008, Huntsman won re-election with 77.7% of the vote, defeating Democratic nominee Bob Springmeyer.

Huntsman maintained high approval ratings as governor of Utah, reaching 90% approval at times. He left office with his approval ratings over 80%. Utah was named the best managed state by the Pew Center on the States. Following his term as governor, Utah was also named a top-three state to do business in. The 2006 Cato Institute evaluation gave Huntsman an overall fiscal policy grade of "B"; the institute gave him an "A" on tax policy and an "F" on spending policy.

Depending on the methodology used, Utah was either the top-ranked state or fourth-ranked state in the nation for job growth during Huntsman's tenure, with a rate of either 5.9% or 4.8% between 2005 and 2009.

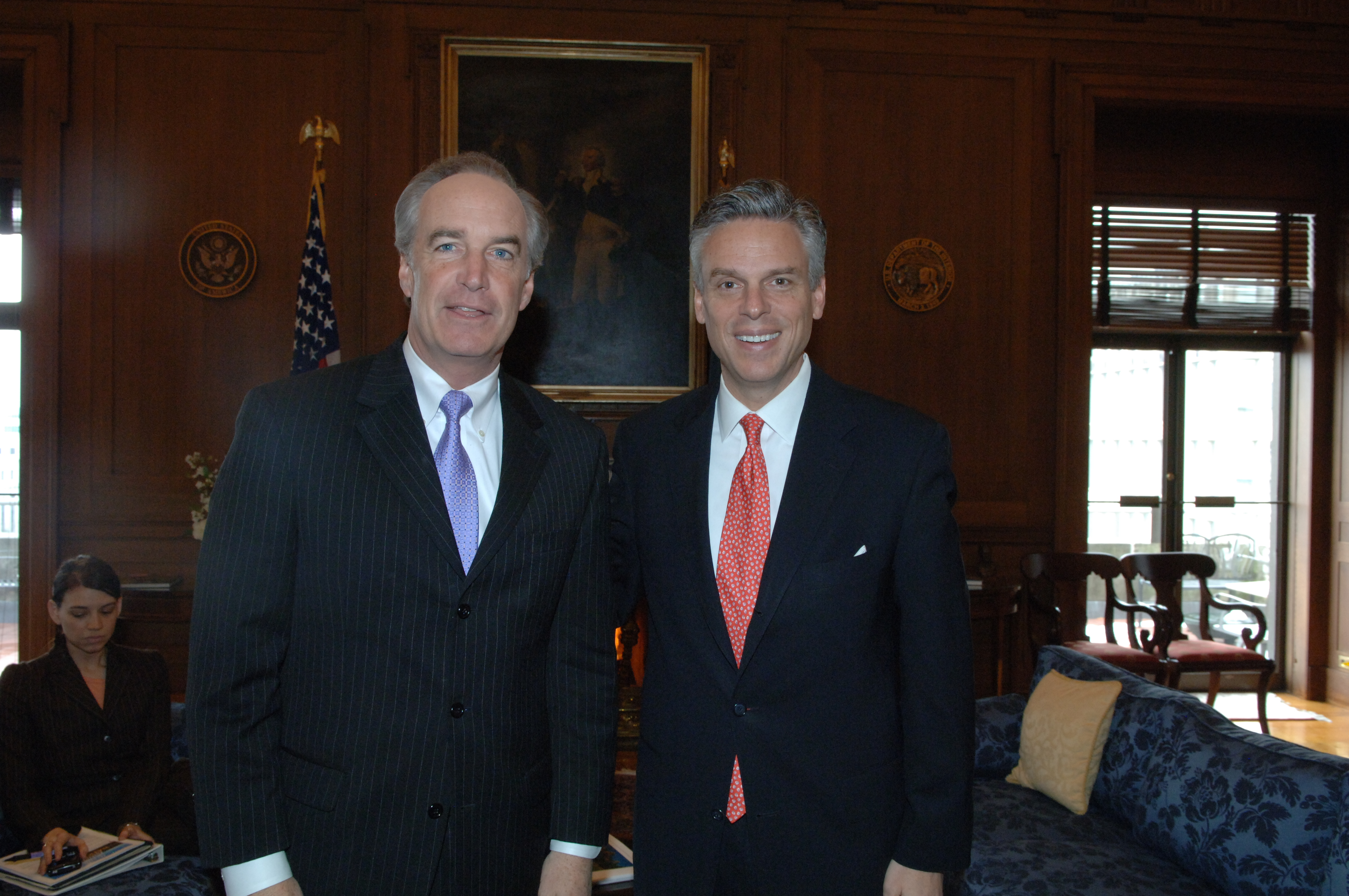
Huntsman with Secretary of the Interior Dirk Kempthorne in February 2007.

The Utah Taxpayers Association estimates that "tax cuts from 2005 to 2007 totaled $407 million." Huntsman proposed eliminating the corporate franchise tax for small businesses making less than $5 million. During his term as governor, he was successful in having Utah replace its progressive income tax with a top rate of 7%, with a flat tax of 5%; cut the statewide sales tax rate from 4.75% to 4.65% and sales tax on unprepared food from 4.70% to 1.75%; and raise motor vehicle registration fees. He proposed a 400% increase in cigarette taxes, but the measure was never signed into law. In 2008, he successively proposed tax credits for families purchasing their own health insurance, as well as income tax credits for capital gains and solar projects.

During Huntsman's administration, the state budget rose from $8.28 to 11.57 billion.

Huntsman supported cap and trade policies, and as governor, signed the Western Climate Initiative. He also supported an increase in the federal minimum wage. He also cut some regulations, including Utah's very strict alcohol laws. In 2007, he signed into law the Parent Choice in Education Act, which he said was "the largest school-voucher bill to date in the United States. This massive school-choice program provides scholarships ranging from $500 to $3000 to help parents send their children to the private school of their choice. The program was open to all current public school children, as well as some children already in private school." The voucher law was later repealed in a public referendum.

Huntsman was one of John McCain's earliest supporters in his 2008 presidential campaign. Huntsman helped McCain campaign in New Hampshire and other early primary states and went with him to Iraq twice including over Thanksgiving in 2007. At the 2008 Republican National Convention, Huntsman delivered a nominating speech for Alaska Gov. Sarah Palin, the party's nominee for vice president. Huntsman also helped raise more than $500,000 for McCain's 2008 presidential campaign. Speaking about McCain's loss, Huntsman later observed, "We're fundamentally staring down a demographic shift that we've never seen before in America".

=== Ambassador to China ===
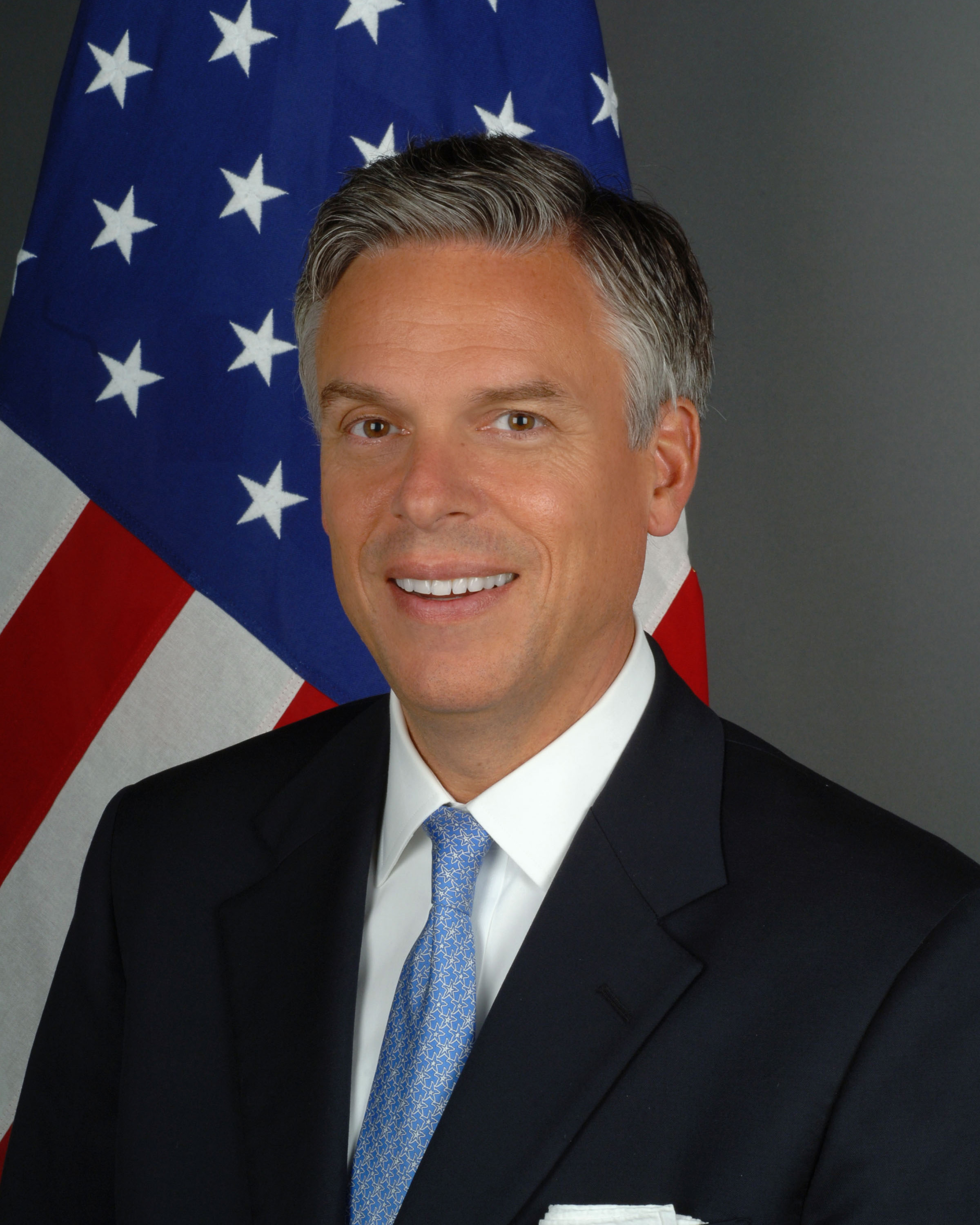
Huntsman's official portrait as U.S. ambassador to China, July 2009

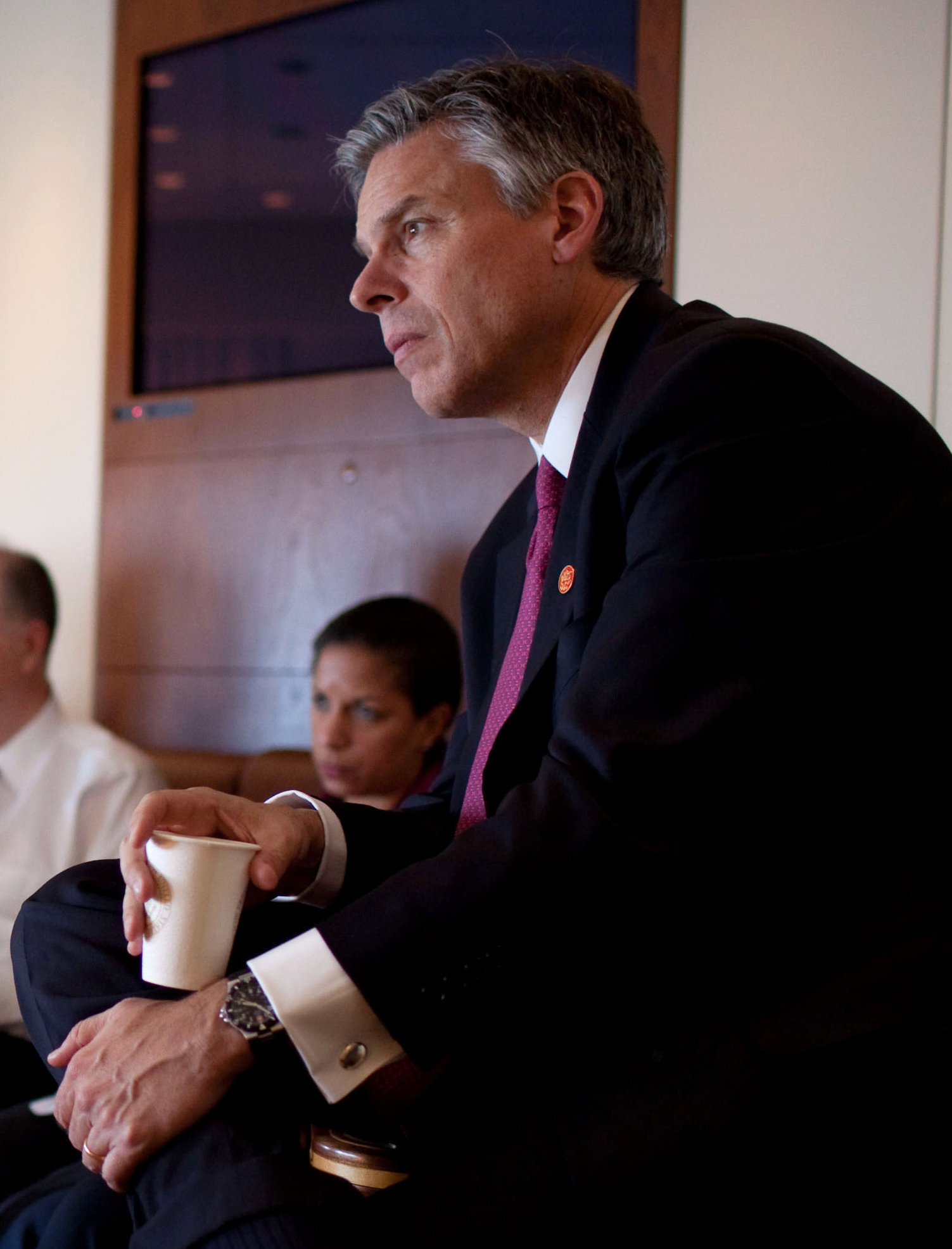
Huntsman aboard Air Force One en route to Beijing, November 2009

President Barack Obama nominated Jon Huntsman to serve as the United States Ambassador to China on May 16, 2009, noting his experience in the region and proficiency in Mandarin Chinese. His nomination was formally delivered to the Senate on July 6, 2009, and on July 23, 2009, he appeared before the Senate Foreign Relations Committee, which favorably reported his nomination to the full Senate on August 4, 2009. On August 7, 2009, the Senate unanimously confirmed Huntsman and he formally resigned as governor of Utah and was sworn in as ambassador to China on August 11, 2009. Huntsman arrived in Beijing on August 21, 2009, to begin his assignment, and he delivered his first press conference on August 22 after a meeting with Commerce Minister Chen Deming.

In February 2011, Huntsman made a controversial appearance at the site of a planned pro-democracy protest in Beijing. The spokesman for the U.S. Embassy in China stated that Huntsman had been unaware of the planned protest, and happened to be strolling through the area on a family outing.

Huntsman resigned from his position as ambassador, effective April 30, 2011, in order to return to the United States to explore a 2012 presidential bid.

=== 2012 presidential campaign ===
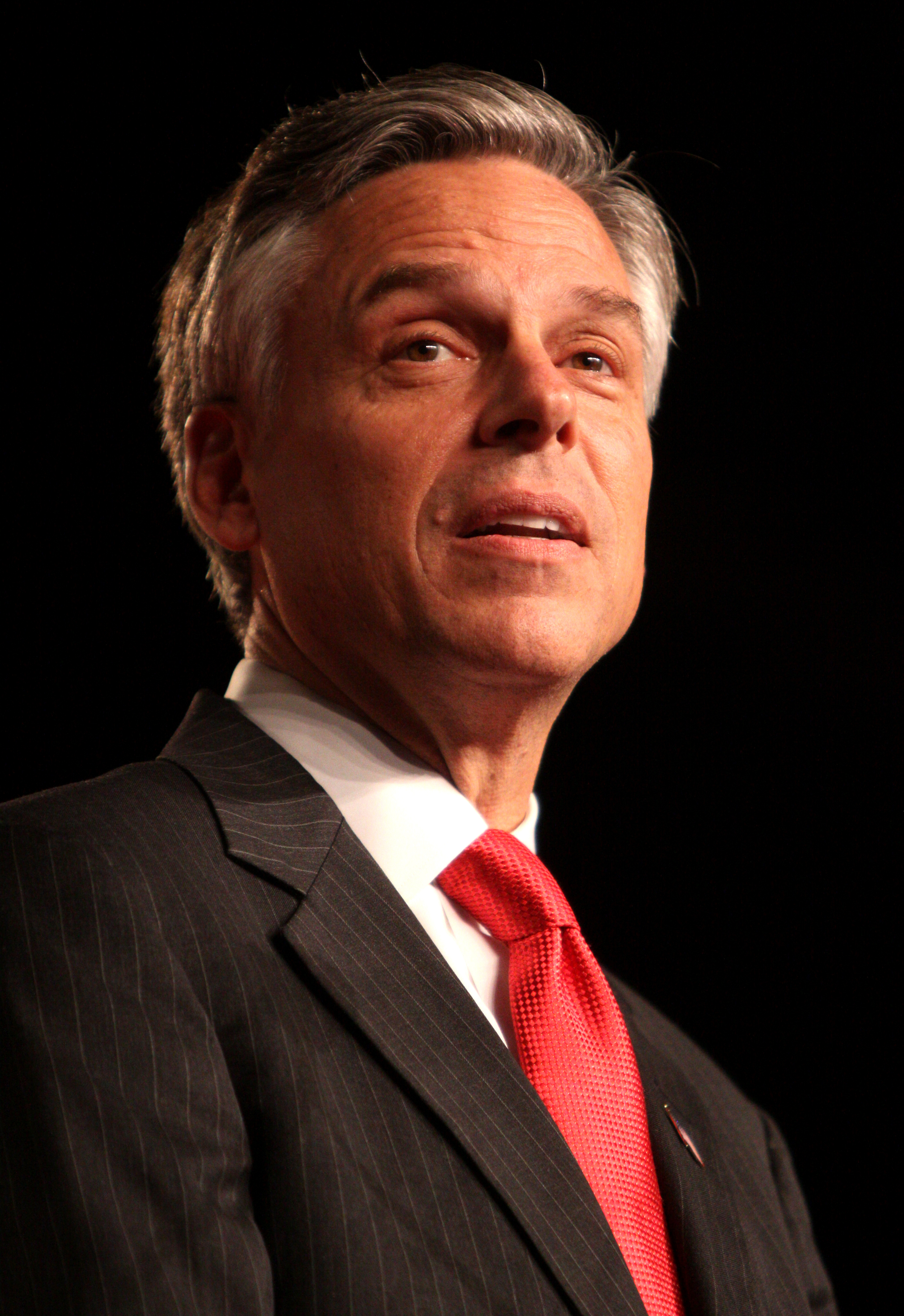
Huntsman speaking in Orlando, Florida in September 2011

==== Background ====
Huntsman's name appeared on lists of potential Republican nominees for the 2012 presidential election as early as 2008 and 2009, and John McCain specifically mentioned Huntsman as a potential candidate for the 2012 election in March 2009.

In August 2010, a group of political strategists close to Huntsman formed a political action committee called Horizon PAC. On February 22, 2011, Horizon PAC launched its official website, stating that it "supports free-market values, principled leadership and a commitment to long-term solutions".

==== Campaign ====
On January 31, 2011, Huntsman submitted his formal resignation from his post as U.S. Ambassador to China effective April 30, 2011, indicating his plans to return to the United States at that time. Huntsman's associates indicated that he was likely to explore a 2012 Republican presidential bid.

On May 3, 2011, he formed an official fundraising political action committee, building on the efforts of the previously established Horizon PAC. On May 18, 2011, Huntsman opened his 2012 national campaign headquarters in Orlando, Florida. Huntsman formally entered the race for the Republican presidential nomination on June 21, 2011, announcing his bid in a speech at Liberty State Park in New Jersey, with the Statue of Liberty in the background—the same site where Ronald Reagan launched his campaign in 1980.

Huntsman sought to establish himself as an anti-negative candidate and take the "high road". In his announcement, he also stated "I don't think you need to run down someone's reputation in order to run for the office of President."

Huntsman focused his energy and resources on the New Hampshire primary. On October 18, 2011, he boycotted the Republican presidential debate in Las Vegas, out of deference to New Hampshire, which was locked in a political scheduling fight with Nevada. Huntsman eventually finished third in New Hampshire, and announced the end of his campaign on January 16, 2012. He endorsed Mitt Romney at that time.

=== Post-campaign politics ===
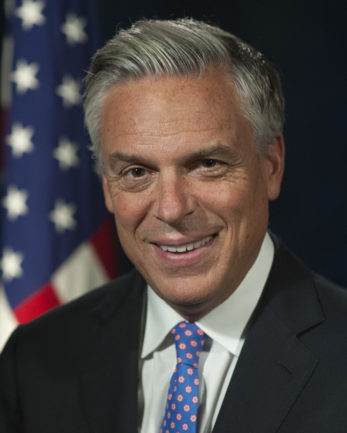
Huntsman's official photograph in September 2017 during the first Trump administration

A month after dropping out of the 2012 race, Huntsman suggested there was a need for a third party in the United States, stating that "the real issues [were] not being addressed, and it's time that we put forward an alternative vision." Huntsman said that he would not run as a third-party presidential candidate in 2012. In early July, Huntsman announced that he would not be attending the 2012 Republican National Convention for the first time since he attended as a Reagan delegate in 1984; he stated he would "not be attending this year's convention, nor any Republican convention in the future until the party focuses on a bigger, bolder, more confident future for the United States—a future based on problem solving, inclusiveness, and a willingness to address the trust deficit, which is every bit as corrosive as our fiscal and economic deficits."

Shortly after Obama's re-election, Obama's campaign manager Jim Messina admitted that the Obama campaign believed Huntsman would have been a particularly difficult candidate to defeat in the general election. Messina said that the campaign was "honest about our concerns about Huntsman" and that Huntsman "would have been a very tough candidate".

In January 2014, Huntsman was named chairman of the Atlanticist think-tank the Atlantic Council. Huntsman indicated in an interview with Politico that he would not run in the 2016 presidential election.

In April 2016, Huntsman decided to endorse Republican nominee Donald Trump, but later retracted his endorsement of Trump following the Access Hollywood controversy. However, Huntsman later defended Trump in interviews with Fox News and The New York Times after Trump received criticism for accepting a congratulatory phone call with the president of Taiwan, Tsai Ing-wen, during his transition process. Huntsman said the critics were overreacting to Trump's decision to accept the phone call, and that Trump's nontraditional style might be an opportunity for a shift in Asia relations in future talks with China.

In November 2016, Huntsman said he was considering a run for the U.S. Senate in 2018, though he ultimately chose not to run for the seat.

Huntsman was the co-chair of the Commission on the Theft of American Intellectual Property, along with Dennis C. Blair. The commission is an independent and bipartisan initiative from the public and private sectors. Its mission is to document and assess the extent of international intellectual property theft, particularly by China, and propose appropriate policy responses. According to the commission's analysis, the U.S. has lost up to $600 billion in illicit technology transfers to China. According to Huntsman,

The vast, illicit transfer of American innovation is one of the most significant economic issues impacting U.S. competitiveness that the nation has not fully addressed. It ... must be a top priority of the new administration [in 2016].

=== Ambassador to Russia ===
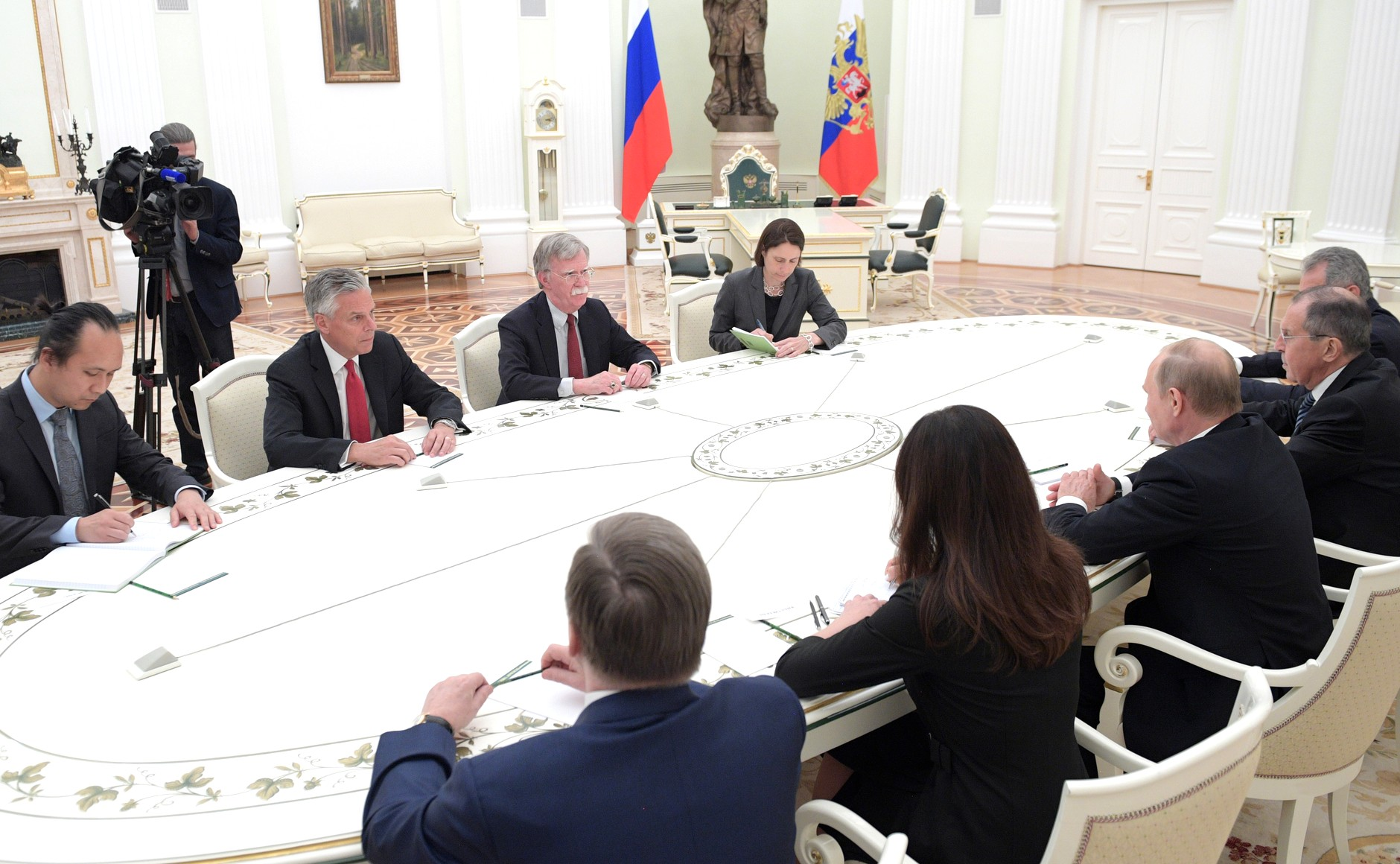
Huntsman speaking with Russian President Vladimir Putin and Russian Foreign Minister Sergey Lavrov in June 2018. John Bolton is seated to his right.

On December 3, 2016, the Associated Press reported Huntsman was being considered by Donald Trump and the Trump transition team as a possible choice for United States Secretary of State in 2017, although Rex Tillerson was chosen 10 days later.

On March 8, 2017, it was reported that Huntsman accepted a position as United States Ambassador to Russia. During his Senate confirmation hearings, he said, "There is no question that the Russian Government interfered in the U.S. election" in 2016. He also said the relationship between the two countries was "among the most consequential and complex foreign policy challenges we face." Huntsman was unanimously confirmed by the Senate, via voice vote, on September 28, 2017.

Statement from an interview with the Ambassador of the United States to Russia Jon Huntsman in 2018 while at the launch of Expedition 56-57 from the Baikonur Cosmodrome to the International Space Station

During his time as ambassador, Huntsman reported having access to senior Russian officials, which he stated was not always the case during his ambassadorship to China. He also expressed a desire to avoid repeating past mistakes in the relationship, stating: "In the years past, every new administration has tried to reset or redo of some sort.(...) Let's not repeat the cycles of the past, because in every case,(...) those resets could not be sustained. Let's not even begin with that thought in mind; no resets, no redos. Just take the relationship for what it is, clear-eyed and realistically."

Huntsman submitted his resignation as U.S. Ambassador to Russia to President Trump on August 6, 2019, with his resignation taking effect on October 3, 2019. After Huntsman left the post, Bartle B. Gorman, deputy ambassador to Russia, served as the embassy's Chargé d'Affaires (until the arrival of John J. Sullivan as new ambassador).

=== 2020 Utah gubernatorial campaign ===
After his resignation as U.S. ambassador to Russia in August 2019, many speculated that Huntsman was considering another run for Utah governor. An October 2019 poll of likely Utah voters showed Huntsman as a favorite among several potential gubernatorial candidates.

On November 14, 2019, Huntsman announced on KSL Radio that he would run for Governor of Utah in the 2020 election. In the six weeks between Huntsman's announcement and the end of 2019, Huntsman's campaign raised $520,000, and visited all 29 Utah counties.

His daughter, Abby Huntsman, announced in January 2020 that she would leave her position on The View to join his gubernatorial campaign as a senior advisor. On February 7, 2020, Huntsman announced that Provo city mayor Michelle Kaufusi would be his gubernatorial running mate. A poll taken among likely voters in February showed Huntsman leading the race with 32% support, while 31% remained undecided. However, Lieutenant Governor Spencer Cox ultimately won the primary with 36.4% of the vote against Huntsman's 34.6%, and went on to win the general election.

== Political positions ==
Huntsman has been described as "a conservative technocrat-optimist with moderate positions who was willing to work substantively with President Barack Obama" and identifies himself as a center-right conservative.

During his first term as Utah governor, Huntsman listed economic development, healthcare reform, education, and energy security as his top priorities. He oversaw tax cuts and advocated reorganizing the way that services were distributed so that the government would not become overwhelmed by the state's fast-growing population.

Building a winning coalition to tackle the looming fiscal and trust deficits will be impossible [for Republicans] if we continue to alienate broad segments of the population. We must be happy warriors who refuse to tolerate those who want Hispanic votes but not Hispanic neighbors.

— Jon Huntsman Jr.

=== Healthcare ===
During his time as Utah governor, Huntsman proposed a plan to reform healthcare, mainly through the private sector, by using tax breaks and negotiation to keep prices down.

In 2007, when asked about a healthcare mandate, Huntsman said, "I'm comfortable with a requirement–you can call it whatever you want, but at some point we're going to have to get serious about how we deal with this issue". The healthcare plan that passed in Utah under Huntsman did not include a healthcare mandate.

=== Fiscal policy ===
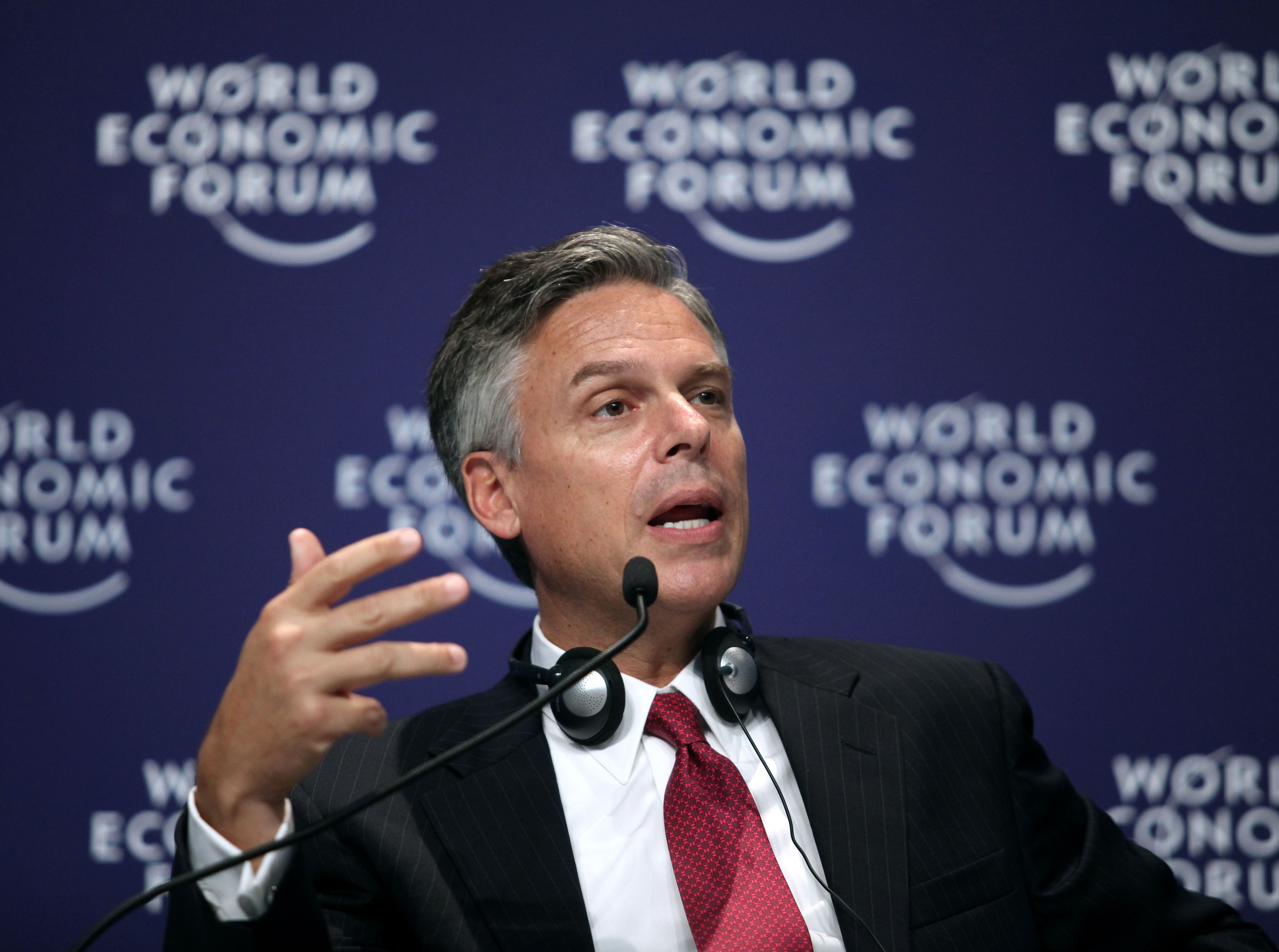
Huntsman speaking at the World Economic Forum in Dalian, China, in September 2009

In a 2008 evaluation of state governors' fiscal policies, the libertarian Cato Institute praised Huntsman's conservative tax policies, ranking him in a tie for fifth place on overall fiscal policy. He was particularly lauded for his efforts to cut taxes. The report specifically highlighted his reductions of the sales tax and simplification of the tax code. However the report concluded that: "Unfortunately, Huntsman has completely dropped the ball on spending, with per capita spending increasing at about 10 percent annually during his tenure." He defines his taxation policy as "business friendly".

As part of his presidential campaign Huntsman said "our tax code has devolved into a maze of special-interest carve-outs, loopholes, and temporary provisions that cost taxpayers more than $400 billion a year to comply with". The candidate called for "[getting] rid of all tax expenditures, all loopholes, all deductions, all subsidies. Use that to lower rates across the board. And do it on a revenue-neutral basis".

In addition, Huntsman has proposed reducing the corporate tax rate from 35% to 25%, eliminating corporate taxes on income earned overseas, and implementing a tax holiday to encourage corporations to return profits from offshore tax havens. He favored eliminating taxes on capital gains and dividends.

=== Social issues ===
As the governor of Utah, Huntsman signed several bills placing limits on abortion.

During the 2012 presidential race, and as governor of Utah, Huntsman supported civil unions for same-sex couples but not same-sex marriage.

In a February 2013 op-ed published in The American Conservative, Huntsman updated his stance to one of support for same-sex marriage, stating: "All Americans should be treated equally by the law, whether they marry in a church, another religious institution, or a town hall. This does not mean that any religious group would be forced by the state to recognize relationships that run counter to their conscience. Civil equality is compatible with, and indeed promotes, freedom of conscience." In 2013, Huntsman was a signatory to an amicus curiae brief submitted to the Supreme Court in support of same-sex marriage during the Hollingsworth v. Perry case.

=== Environment and energy ===
In 2007, in response to the issue of global warming, Huntsman signed the Western Climate Initiative, by which Utah joined with other governments in agreeing to pursue targets for reduced production of greenhouse gases. He also appeared in an advertisement sponsored by Environmental Defense, in which he said, "Now it's time for Congress to act by capping greenhouse-gas pollution."

In 2011, in response to comments by Rick Perry and other Republican presidential candidates, Huntsman stated he "believe[s] in evolution and trust[s] scientists" on climate change. Commenting later on his statement, Huntsman remarked "I felt that it was important to remind a lot of Republican voters who care and a lot of independent voters who care, that there is a candidate who does believe in science."

Huntsman has stated a preference for international cooperation in handling climate change, stating "it's a global issue. We can enact policies here [in the United States], but I wouldn't want to unilaterally disarm as a country."

=== Foreign policy ===
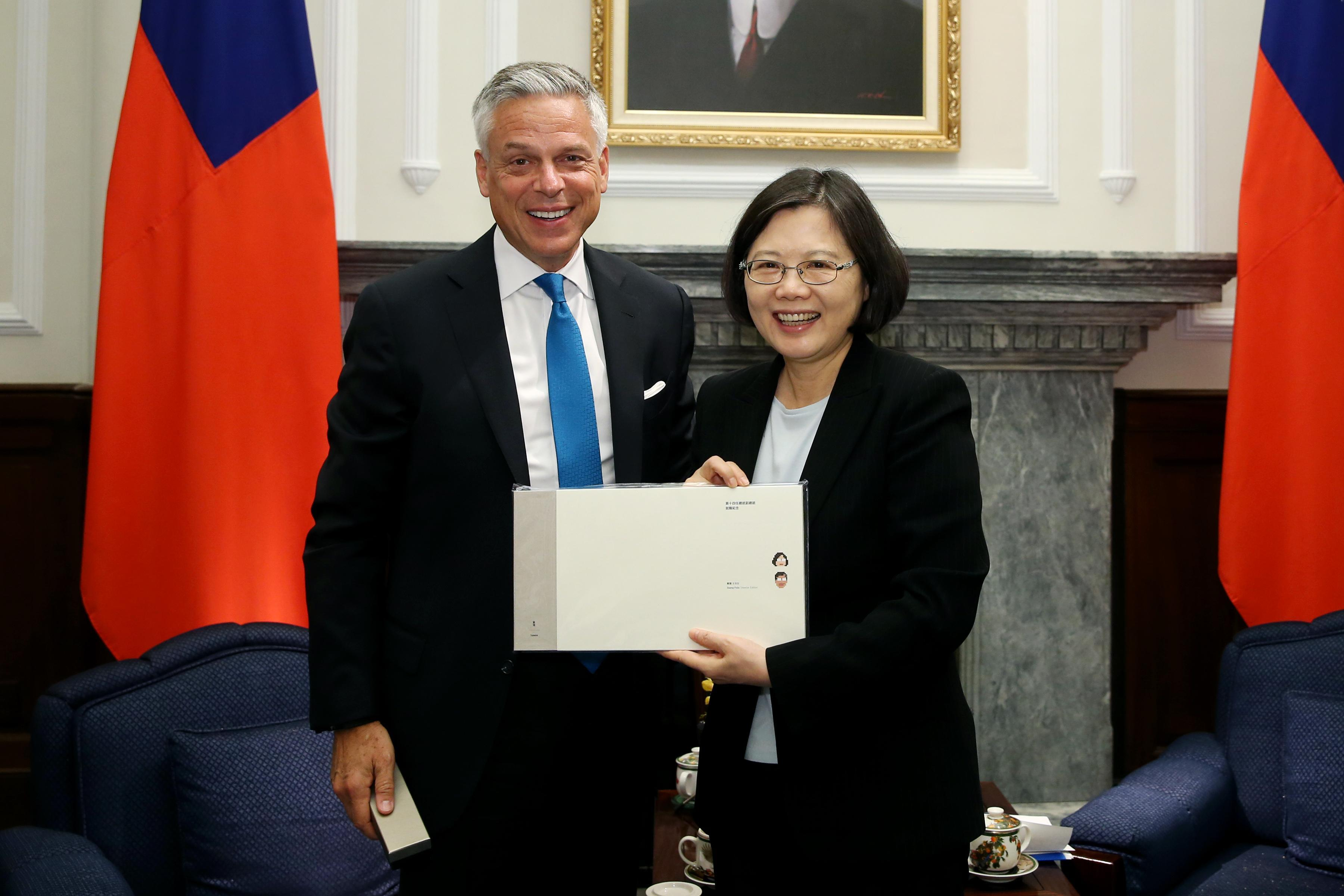
Huntsman meeting with Taiwan President Tsai Ing-wen in June 2016

Huntsman has repeatedly stated, "We need to continue working closely with China to convince North Korea to abandon its nuclear weapons program". He has also named Taiwan, human rights, and Tibet among the "areas where we have differences with China" and vowed "robust engagement" as ambassador. Huntsman, who lived in Taiwan as a Mormon missionary, said he felt "personally invested in the peaceful resolution of cross-strait differences, in a way that respects the wishes of the people on both Taiwan and the mainland. In 2009, he said that then-current U.S. policy "support[ed] this objective, and [he was] encouraged by the recent relaxing of cross-strait tensions."

During his 2020 gubernatorial campaign, and after serving as Ambassador to Russia, Huntsman stated that "[the Russians] want to see us divided. They want to drive a wedge into politics... The American people do not understand the expertise at their disposal to divide us, to prey on our divisions. They take both sides of an issue to deepen the political divide. They are active during mass shootings. They are active during racial tension. They take advantage of us. We think it's fellow Americans who are taking extreme positions sometimes. It's not."

=== Immigration ===
In 2005, Huntsman signed a bill giving undocumented migrants access to "driving-privilege cards", which allowed them to have driving privileges but unlike driver licenses, cannot be used for identification purposes. In a 2011 presidential debate, Huntsman defended the move, explaining that "[illegal immigrants] were given a driver's license before and they were using that for identification purposes. And I thought that was wrong. Instead we issued a driver privilege card, which in our state allowed our economy to continue to function. And it said in very bold letters, not to be used for identification purposes. It was a pragmatic local government driven fix and it proved that the Tenth Amendment works."

In June 2007, Huntsman joined other Western governors in urging the Senate to pass comprehensive immigration reform. As governor, Huntsman threatened to veto a measure repealing in-state college tuition for illegal immigrants.

Huntsman has stated support for a border fence, saying that, "as an American, the thought of a fence to some extent repulses me ... but the situation is such that I don't think we have a choice".

Huntsman supports granting more H-1B visas to foreigners. Huntsman also supported the DREAM Act, which proposed a path to citizenship for young people brought to the United States by their parents illegally.

== Business career ==
From 1993 to 2001, Huntsman served as an executive for the Huntsman Corporation, chairman of the Huntsman Cancer Foundation, and CEO of Huntsman Family Holdings Company.

In January 2012, Huntsman Cancer Institute announced that Huntsman had been appointed to the position of chairman, replacing his father, who founded the institute.

Huntsman was appointed to the board of directors of the Ford Motor Co. in February 2012. The announcement quoted Ford's executive chairman, William Clay Ford Jr., as praising Huntsman's global knowledge and experience—especially in Asia—as well as his tenure as the governor of Utah. Huntsman was appointed to the board of Caterpillar Inc. in April 2012.

From 2014 to 2017, and again from September 2020, Huntsman served on the board of directors of Chevron Corporation.

Huntsman is a founding director of the Pacific Council on International Policy and has served on the boards of the Brookings Institution, Carnegie Endowment for International Peace, the Asia Society in New York, and the National Bureau of Asian Research.

== Personal life ==
Huntsman has eight brothers and sisters. He married activist Mary Kaye and they have seven children: daughters Mary Anne (b. 1985, who is married to Evan Morgan, son of CNN commentator Gloria Borger), Abigail ("Abby"; b. 1986), Elizabeth ("Liddy"; b. 1988), Gracie Mei (b. 1999; adopted from China) and Asha Bharati (b. 2006; adopted from India); and sons Jon III (b. 1990) and William (b. 1993), both of whom are graduates of the U.S. Naval Academy and serving active duty assignments.

Huntsman is distantly related to 2012 Republican presidential nominee Mitt Romney. Their relationship has been reported to be one of rivalry. After a scandal erupted over the 2002 Winter Olympics in Salt Lake City, Romney and Huntsman were both considered to take over the Salt Lake Organizing Committee for the games. After intense lobbying, Romney was chosen, and the Huntsman family was reportedly "livid". As Romney prepared his 2008 presidential run, he began consulting Huntsman on foreign policy and trade issues. Huntsman's father signed on as a finance chair for Romney's campaign, and it was expected that Huntsman would endorse Romney; instead, Huntsman backed John McCain and became one of the McCain campaign's national co-chairs. Huntsman did endorse Romney in the 2012 election after dropping out.

Huntsman is a self-proclaimed fan of the progressive rock genre and played keyboards during high school in the band Wizard. Huntsman joined REO Speedwagon on the piano for two songs during their concert at the Utah State Fair in 2005. Huntsman is a fan of riding motocross, and he helped in pushing extreme sports and outdoor sports and tourism for the State of Utah.

Huntsman has been awarded eleven honorary doctorate degrees, including an honorary doctorate of public service from Snow College in 2005, an honorary doctorate of science from Westminster College in 2008, an honorary doctorate of humane letters from the University of Utah in 2010, an honorary doctorate of laws from the University of Pennsylvania in 2010, and an honorary doctorate of law from Southern New Hampshire University in 2011. He also received honorary doctorates from the University of Washington, University of Arizona, Utah State University, and University of Wisconsin. He has been recognized as a Significant Sig by Sigma Chi.

In 2007 Huntsman was awarded the Distinguished Eagle Scout Award by the BSA. In October 2018, Huntsman was diagnosed with stage-1 melanoma and sought treatment at the Huntsman Cancer Institute. On June 10, 2020, Huntsman announced that he had tested positive for COVID-19.

=== Religious views ===
Huntsman is a member of the LDS Church and served a church mission to Taiwan. In an interview with Time magazine, he stated that he considers himself more spiritual than religious, and in December 2010, he told Newsweek that the LDS Church doesn't have a monopoly on his spiritual life. In a May 2011 interview, Huntsman said "I believe in God. I'm a good Christian. I'm very proud of my Mormon heritage. I am Mormon."

Huntsman rejects the notion that faith and evolution are mutually exclusive. He said, "The minute that the Republican Party becomes the anti-science party, we have a huge problem. We lose a whole lot of people who would otherwise allow us to win the election in 2012."

== Electoral history ==
2020 Utah Gubernatorial Republican primary results
Party	Candidate	Votes	%
Republican	Spencer Cox	190,565	36.15%
Republican	Jon Huntsman Jr.	184,246	34.95%
Republican	Greg Hughes	110,835	21.02%
Republican	Thomas Wright	41,532	7.88%
Total votes		527,178	100.0%

2008 Utah gubernatorial election
Party	Candidate	Votes	%	±%
Republican	Jon Huntsman Jr. (incumbent)	735,049	77.63%	+19.89%
Democratic	Bob Springmeyer	186,503	19.72%	−21.62%
Libertarian	Dell Schanze	24,820	2.62%	
Write-ins		153	0.02%	
Majority		547,546	57.91%	+41.51%
Turnout		945,525		
Republican hold		Swing		

2004 Utah gubernatorial election
Party	Candidate	Votes	%	±%
Republican	Jon Huntsman Jr.	531,190	57.74%	+1.97%
Democratic	Scott Matheson Jr.	380,359	41.35%	−0.92%
Personal Choice	Ken Larsen	8,399	0.91%	
Write-ins		12	0.00%	
Majority		150,831	16.40%	+2.89%
Turnout		919,960		
Republican hold		Swing		

== See also ==
- 2004 Utah gubernatorial election
- 2008 Utah gubernatorial election
- List of U.S. political appointments that crossed party lines
- List of people and companies named in the Paradise Papers

Diplomatic posts
Preceded by Robert D. Orr	United States Ambassador to Singapore; 1992–1993	Succeeded by Ralph L. Boyce
Preceded by Clark T. Randt Jr.	United States Ambassador to China; 2009–2011	Succeeded by Gary Locke
Preceded by John F. Tefft	United States Ambassador to Russia; 2017–2019	Succeeded by John Sullivan
Preceded by Anthony F. Godfrey as Chargé d'affaires	United States Ambassador to Russia; 2017–2019	Succeeded by John Sullivan
Party political offices
Preceded by Mike Leavitt	Republican nominee for Governor of Utah; 2004, 2008	Succeeded by Gary Herbert
Political offices
Preceded by Olene Walker	Governor of Utah; 2005–2009	Succeeded by Gary Herbert
U.S. order of precedence (ceremonial)
Preceded by Martha McSally as Former U.S. Senator	Order of precedence of the United States; Within Utah	Succeeded by Gary Herbert as Former Governor
Preceded by Matt Mead as Former Governor	Order of precedence of the United States; Outside Utah	Succeeded by Gary Herbert as Former Governor
