= Political party strength in Utah =

Politics in the US state of Utah

== Party affiliation ==
=== Current ===
Party registration as of June 16, 2026
Party	Number of voters	Fraction
Republican	1,034,645	49.6%
Democratic	296,505	14.2%
Unaffiliated	621,905	29.8%
Independent American	95,080	4.6%
Libertarian	24,615	1.2%
Constitution	8,439	0.4%
Forward	3,091	0.1%
Green	1,184	0.1%
Total	2,085,464	100.0%

== Partisan affiliation of elected officials ==
The following table indicates the party of elected officials in the U.S. state of Utah:

- Governor
- Secretary of State/Lieutenant Governor (Note: The Office of the Lieutenant Governor was created in 1976. Prior to the creation of the Lieutenant Governor's office, the succession to the governorship was held by the state secretary of state. The office of Secretary of State was abolished by the legislature in 1976 and those duties given to the newly created Office of the Lieutenant Governor.)
- Attorney General
- State Treasurer
- State Auditor

The table also indicates the historical party composition in the:

- State Senate
- State House of Representatives
- State delegation to the U.S. Senate
- State delegation to the U.S. House of Representatives

For years in which a presidential election was held, the table indicates which party's nominees received the state's electoral votes.

Year	Executive offices					State Legislature		United States Congress			Electoral votes
Year	Governor	Lt. Gov./ Sec. of State	Attorney General	State Treasurer	State Auditor	State Senate	State House	U.S. Senator (Class I)	U.S. Senator (Class III)	U.S. House	Electoral votes
1896	Heber Manning Wells (R)	James T. Hammond (R)	Alexander C. Bishop (R)	James Chipman (R)	Morgan Richards Jr. (R)	12R, 6D	31R, 14D	Frank J. Cannon (R)	Arthur Brown (R)	Clarence Emir Allen (R)	2 – Bryan/Sewall (D/Sv) ✗ 1 – Bryan/Watson (Pop) ✗
1897	Heber Manning Wells (R)	James T. Hammond (R)	Alexander C. Bishop (R)	James Chipman (R)	Morgan Richards Jr. (R)	17R, 1Pop	40R, 3Pop, 2D	Frank J. Cannon (R)	Joseph L. Rawlins (D)	William H. King (D) (Note: King lost renomination in the Democratic primary in 1898 to Brigham H. Roberts. Roberts won the 1898 election, but the House refused to seat him because he was a polygamist. There was a special election in 1900, and King was elected to complete his term until 1901.)	2 – Bryan/Sewall (D/Sv) ✗ 1 – Bryan/Watson (Pop) ✗
1898	Heber Manning Wells (R)	James T. Hammond (R)	Alexander C. Bishop (R)	James Chipman (R)	Morgan Richards Jr. (R)	17R, 1Pop	40R, 3Pop, 2D	Frank J. Cannon (SvR)	Joseph L. Rawlins (D)	William H. King (D)	2 – Bryan/Sewall (D/Sv) ✗ 1 – Bryan/Watson (Pop) ✗
1899	Heber Manning Wells (R)	James T. Hammond (R)	Alexander C. Bishop (R)	James Chipman (R)	Morgan Richards Jr. (R)	14D, 2R, 2I	26D, 15R, 4I	vacant	Joseph L. Rawlins (D)	William H. King (D)	2 – Bryan/Sewall (D/Sv) ✗ 1 – Bryan/Watson (Pop) ✗
1900	Heber Manning Wells (R)	James T. Hammond (R)	Alexander C. Bishop (R)	James Chipman (R)	Morgan Richards Jr. (R)	14D, 2R, 2I	26D, 15R, 4I	vacant	Joseph L. Rawlins (D)	William H. King (D)	William McKinley/ Theodore Roosevelt (R) ✓
1901	Heber Manning Wells (R)	James T. Hammond (R)	M. A. Breeden (R)	John DeGrey Dixon (R)	Charles S. Tingey (R)	10D, 8R	28R, 17D	Thomas Kearns (R)	Joseph L. Rawlins (D)	George Sutherland (R)	William McKinley/ Theodore Roosevelt (R) ✓
1902	Heber Manning Wells (R)	James T. Hammond (R)	M. A. Breeden (R)	John DeGrey Dixon (R)	Charles S. Tingey (R)	10D, 8R	28R, 17D	Thomas Kearns (R)	Joseph L. Rawlins (D)	George Sutherland (R)	William McKinley/ Theodore Roosevelt (R) ✓
1903	Heber Manning Wells (R)	James T. Hammond (R)	M. A. Breeden (R)	John DeGrey Dixon (R)	Charles S. Tingey (R)	12R, 6D	38R, 7D	Thomas Kearns (R)	Reed Smoot (R)	Joseph Howell (R)	William McKinley/ Theodore Roosevelt (R) ✓
1904	Heber Manning Wells (R)	James T. Hammond (R)	M. A. Breeden (R)	John DeGrey Dixon (R)	Charles S. Tingey (R)	12R, 6D	38R, 7D	Thomas Kearns (R)	Reed Smoot (R)	Joseph Howell (R)	Theodore Roosevelt/ Charles W. Fairbanks (R) ✓
1905	John Christopher Cutler (R)	Charles S. Tingey (R)	M. A. Breeden (R)	James Christiansen (R)	J. A. Edwards (R)	15R, 3D	41R, 4D	George Sutherland (R)	Reed Smoot (R)	Joseph Howell (R)	Theodore Roosevelt/ Charles W. Fairbanks (R) ✓
1906	John Christopher Cutler (R)	Charles S. Tingey (R)	M. A. Breeden (R)	James Christiansen (R)	J. A. Edwards (R)	15R, 3D	41R, 4D	George Sutherland (R)	Reed Smoot (R)	Joseph Howell (R)	Theodore Roosevelt/ Charles W. Fairbanks (R) ✓
1907	John Christopher Cutler (R)	Charles S. Tingey (R)	M. A. Breeden (R)	James Christiansen (R)	J. A. Edwards (R)	18R	38R, 7D	George Sutherland (R)	Reed Smoot (R)	Joseph Howell (R)	Theodore Roosevelt/ Charles W. Fairbanks (R) ✓
1908	John Christopher Cutler (R)	Charles S. Tingey (R)	M. A. Breeden (R)	James Christiansen (R)	J. A. Edwards (R)	18R	38R, 7D	George Sutherland (R)	Reed Smoot (R)	Joseph Howell (R)	William Howard Taft/ James S. Sherman (R) ✓
1909	William Spry (R)	Charles S. Tingey (R)	A. R. Barnes (R)	David M. Mattson (R)	Jesse D. Jewkes (R)	18R	43R, 2D	George Sutherland (R)	Reed Smoot (R)	Joseph Howell (R)	William Howard Taft/ James S. Sherman (R) ✓
1910	William Spry (R)	Charles S. Tingey (R)	A. R. Barnes (R)	David M. Mattson (R)	Jesse D. Jewkes (R)	18R	43R, 2D	George Sutherland (R)	Reed Smoot (R)	Joseph Howell (R)	William Howard Taft/ James S. Sherman (R) ✓
1911	William Spry (R)	Charles S. Tingey (R)	A. R. Barnes (R)	David M. Mattson (R)	Jesse D. Jewkes (R)	16R, 2D	38R, 7D	George Sutherland (R)	Reed Smoot (R)	Joseph Howell (R)	William Howard Taft/ James S. Sherman (R) ✓
1912	William Spry (R)	Charles S. Tingey (R)	A. R. Barnes (R)	David M. Mattson (R)	Jesse D. Jewkes (R)	16R, 2D	38R, 7D	George Sutherland (R)	Reed Smoot (R)	Joseph Howell (R)	William Howard Taft/ Nicholas Murray Butler (R) ✗
1913	William Spry (R)	David M. Mattson (R)	A. R. Barnes (R)	Jesse D. Jewkes (R)	Lincoln Kelly (R)	17R, 1D	30R, 15D	George Sutherland (R)	Reed Smoot (R)	2R	William Howard Taft/ Nicholas Murray Butler (R) ✗
1914	William Spry (R)	David M. Mattson (R)	A. R. Barnes (R)	Jesse D. Jewkes (R)	Lincoln Kelly (R)	17R, 1D	30R, 15D	George Sutherland (R)	Reed Smoot (R)	2R	William Howard Taft/ Nicholas Murray Butler (R) ✗
1915	William Spry (R)	David M. Mattson (R)	A. R. Barnes (R)	Jesse D. Jewkes (R)	Lincoln Kelly (R)	12R, 6D	23R, 10D-Prog, 8D, 3Prog, 1Soc	George Sutherland (R)	Reed Smoot (R)	1D, 1R	William Howard Taft/ Nicholas Murray Butler (R) ✗
1916	William Spry (R)	David M. Mattson (R)	A. R. Barnes (R)	Jesse D. Jewkes (R)	Lincoln Kelly (R)	12R, 6D	23R, 10D-Prog, 8D, 3Prog, 1Soc	George Sutherland (R)	Reed Smoot (R)	1D, 1R	Woodrow Wilson/ Thomas R. Marshall (D) ✓
1917	Simon Bamberger (D)	Harden Bennion (D)	Dan B. Shields (D)	Daniel O. Larson (D)	Joseph Ririe (D)	14D, 4R	44D, 1Soc	William H. King (D)	Reed Smoot (R)	2D	Woodrow Wilson/ Thomas R. Marshall (D) ✓
1918	Simon Bamberger (D)	Harden Bennion (D)	Dan B. Shields (D)	Daniel O. Larson (D)	Joseph Ririe (D)	14D, 4R	44D, 1Soc	William H. King (D)	Reed Smoot (R)	2D	Woodrow Wilson/ Thomas R. Marshall (D) ✓
1919	Simon Bamberger (D)	Harden Bennion (D)	Dan B. Shields (D)	Daniel O. Larson (D)	Joseph Ririe (D)	18D	37D, 8R	William H. King (D)	Reed Smoot (R)	2D	Woodrow Wilson/ Thomas R. Marshall (D) ✓
1920	Simon Bamberger (D)	Harden Bennion (D)	Dan B. Shields (D)	Daniel O. Larson (D)	Joseph Ririe (D)	18D	37D, 8R	William H. King (D)	Reed Smoot (R)	2D	Warren G. Harding/ Calvin Coolidge (R) ✓
1921	Charles R. Mabey (R)	H. E. Crockett (R)	Harvey H. Cluff (R)	W. D. Sutton (R)	Mark Tuttle (R)	11R, 7D	46R, 1D	William H. King (D)	Reed Smoot (R)	2R	Warren G. Harding/ Calvin Coolidge (R) ✓
1922	Charles R. Mabey (R)	H. E. Crockett (R)	Harvey H. Cluff (R)	W. D. Sutton (R)	Mark Tuttle (R)	11R, 7D	46R, 1D	William H. King (D)	Reed Smoot (R)	2R	Warren G. Harding/ Calvin Coolidge (R) ✓
1923	Charles R. Mabey (R)	H. E. Crockett (R)	Harvey H. Cluff (R)	W. D. Sutton (R)	Mark Tuttle (R)	19R, 1D	45R, 10D	William H. King (D)	Reed Smoot (R)	2R	Warren G. Harding/ Calvin Coolidge (R) ✓
1924	Charles R. Mabey (R)	H. E. Crockett (R)	Harvey H. Cluff (R)	W. D. Sutton (R)	Mark Tuttle (R)	19R, 1D	45R, 10D	William H. King (D)	Reed Smoot (R)	2R	Calvin Coolidge/ Charles G. Dawes (R) ✓
1925	George Dern (D)	H. E. Crockett (R)	Harvey H. Cluff (R)	John Walker (R)	John E. Holden (R)	19R, 1D	46R, 9D	William H. King (D)	Reed Smoot (R)	2R	Calvin Coolidge/ Charles G. Dawes (R) ✓
1926	George Dern (D)	H. E. Crockett (R)	Harvey H. Cluff (R)	John Walker (R)	John E. Holden (R)	19R, 1D	46R, 9D	William H. King (D)	Reed Smoot (R)	2R	Calvin Coolidge/ Charles G. Dawes (R) ✓
1927	George Dern (D)	H. E. Crockett (R)	Harvey H. Cluff (R)	John Walker (R)	John E. Holden (R)	19R, 1D	49R, 6D	William H. King (D)	Reed Smoot (R)	2R	Calvin Coolidge/ Charles G. Dawes (R) ✓
1928	George Dern (D)	H. E. Crockett (R)	Harvey H. Cluff (R)	John Walker (R)	John E. Holden (R)	19R, 1D	49R, 6D	William H. King (D)	Reed Smoot (R)	2R	Herbert Hoover/ Charles Curtis (R) ✓
1929	George Dern (D)	Milton H. Welling (D)	George P. Parker (R)	A. Edsel Christensen (R)	Ivor Ajax (R)	11R, 9D	29R, 26D	William H. King (D)	Reed Smoot (R)	2R	Herbert Hoover/ Charles Curtis (R) ✓
1930	George Dern (D)	Milton H. Welling (D)	George P. Parker (R)	A. Edsel Christensen (R)	Ivor Ajax (R)	11R, 9D	29R, 26D	William H. King (D)	Reed Smoot (R)	2R	Herbert Hoover/ Charles Curtis (R) ✓
1931	George Dern (D)	Milton H. Welling (D)	George P. Parker (R)	A. Edsel Christensen (R)	Ivor Ajax (R)	11R, 9D	41R, 14D	William H. King (D)	Reed Smoot (R)	2R	Herbert Hoover/ Charles Curtis (R) ✓
1932	George Dern (D)	Milton H. Welling (D)	George P. Parker (R)	A. Edsel Christensen (R)	Ivor Ajax (R)	11R, 9D	41R, 14D	William H. King (D)	Reed Smoot (R)	2R	Franklin D. Roosevelt/ John Nance Garner (D) ✓
1933	Henry H. Blood (D)	Milton H. Welling (D)	Joseph Chez (D)	A. Edsel Christensen (R)	Julius C. Anderson (D)	13D, 10R	51D, 9R	William H. King (D)	Elbert D. Thomas (D)	2D	Franklin D. Roosevelt/ John Nance Garner (D) ✓
1934	Henry H. Blood (D)	Milton H. Welling (D)	Joseph Chez (D)	Enos Hodge (NP)	Julius C. Anderson (D)	13D, 10R	51D, 9R	William H. King (D)	Elbert D. Thomas (D)	2D	Franklin D. Roosevelt/ John Nance Garner (D) ✓
1935	Henry H. Blood (D)	Milton H. Welling (D)	Joseph Chez (D)	Joseph Ririe (D)	Julius C. Anderson (D)	19D, 4R	56D, 4R	William H. King (D)	Elbert D. Thomas (D)	2D	Franklin D. Roosevelt/ John Nance Garner (D) ✓
1936	Henry H. Blood (D)	Milton H. Welling (D)	Joseph Chez (D)	Joseph Ririe (D)	Julius C. Anderson (D)	19D, 4R	56D, 4R	William H. King (D)	Elbert D. Thomas (D)	2D	Franklin D. Roosevelt/ John Nance Garner (D) ✓
1937	Henry H. Blood (D)	E. E. Monson (D)	Joseph Chez (D)	Reece M. Reese (D)	John W. Guy (D)	22D, 1R	56D, 4R	William H. King (D)	Elbert D. Thomas (D)	2D	Franklin D. Roosevelt/ John Nance Garner (D) ✓
1938	Henry H. Blood (D)	E. E. Monson (D)	Joseph Chez (D)	Reece M. Reese (D)	John W. Guy (D)	22D, 1R	56D, 4R	William H. King (D)	Elbert D. Thomas (D)	2D	Franklin D. Roosevelt/ John Nance Garner (D) ✓
1939	Henry H. Blood (D)	E. E. Monson (D)	Joseph Chez (D)	Reece M. Reese (D)	John W. Guy (D)	21D, 2R	45D, 15R	William H. King (D)	Elbert D. Thomas (D)	2D	Franklin D. Roosevelt/ John Nance Garner (D) ✓
1940	Henry H. Blood (D)	E. E. Monson (D)	Joseph Chez (D)	Reece M. Reese (D)	John W. Guy (D)	21D, 2R	45D, 15R	William H. King (D)	Elbert D. Thomas (D)	2D	Franklin D. Roosevelt/ Henry A. Wallace (D) ✓
1941	Herbert B. Maw (D)	E. E. Monson (D)	Grover A. Giles (D)	Oliver G. Ellis (D)	Reece M. Reese (D)	19D, 4R	44D, 16R	Abe Murdock (D)	Elbert D. Thomas (D)	2D	Franklin D. Roosevelt/ Henry A. Wallace (D) ✓
1942	Herbert B. Maw (D)	E. E. Monson (D)	Grover A. Giles (D)	Oliver G. Ellis (D)	Reece M. Reese (D)	19D, 4R	44D, 16R	Abe Murdock (D)	Elbert D. Thomas (D)	2D	Franklin D. Roosevelt/ Henry A. Wallace (D) ✓
1943	Herbert B. Maw (D)	E. E. Monson (D)	Grover A. Giles (D)	Oliver G. Ellis (D)	Reece M. Reese (D)	17D, 6R	39D, 21R	Abe Murdock (D)	Elbert D. Thomas (D)	2D	Franklin D. Roosevelt/ Henry A. Wallace (D) ✓
1944	Herbert B. Maw (D)	E. E. Monson (D)	Grover A. Giles (D)	Oliver G. Ellis (D)	Reece M. Reese (D)	17D, 6R	39D, 21R	Abe Murdock (D)	Elbert D. Thomas (D)	2D	Franklin D. Roosevelt/ Harry S. Truman (D) ✓
1945	Herbert B. Maw (D)	E. E. Monson (D)	Grover A. Giles (D)	Reece M. Reese (D)	Ferrell Adams (D)	18D, 5R	45D, 15R	Abe Murdock (D)	Elbert D. Thomas (D)	2D	Franklin D. Roosevelt/ Harry S. Truman (D) ✓
1946	Herbert B. Maw (D)	E. E. Monson (D)	Grover A. Giles (D)	Reece M. Reese (D)	Ferrell Adams (D)	18D, 5R	45D, 15R	Abe Murdock (D)	Elbert D. Thomas (D)	2D	Franklin D. Roosevelt/ Harry S. Truman (D) ✓
1947	Herbert B. Maw (D)	E. E. Monson (D)	Grover A. Giles (D)	Reece M. Reese (D)	Ferrell Adams (D)	12D, 11R	39R, 21D	Arthur V. Watkins (R)	Elbert D. Thomas (D)	1D, 1R	Franklin D. Roosevelt/ Harry S. Truman (D) ✓
1948	Herbert B. Maw (D)	E. E. Monson (D)	Grover A. Giles (D)	Reece M. Reese (D)	Ferrell Adams (D)	12D, 11R	39R, 21D	Arthur V. Watkins (R)	Elbert D. Thomas (D)	1D, 1R	Harry S. Truman/ Alben W. Barkley (D) ✓
1949	J. Bracken Lee (R)	Heber Bennion Jr. (D)	Clinton D. Vernon (D)	Ferrell Adams (D)	Reece M. Reese (D)	12D, 11R	41D, 19R	Arthur V. Watkins (R)	Elbert D. Thomas (D)	2D	Harry S. Truman/ Alben W. Barkley (D) ✓
1950	J. Bracken Lee (R)	Heber Bennion Jr. (D)	Clinton D. Vernon (D)	Ferrell Adams (D)	Reece M. Reese (D)	12D, 11R	41D, 19R	Arthur V. Watkins (R)	Elbert D. Thomas (D)	2D	Harry S. Truman/ Alben W. Barkley (D) ✓
1951	J. Bracken Lee (R)	Heber Bennion Jr. (D)	Clinton D. Vernon (D)	Ferrell Adams (D)	Reece M. Reese (D)	16D, 7R	30D, 30R (Note: After a four-day standoff, a power-sharing agreement was worked out between both parties, with Republicans gaining the Speakership under Clifton G.M. Kerr, and Democrats having control of four committees of their choosing, including the Appropriations Committee, with the other 34 committees alternating between the two parties for choice of control. As such, Democrats controlled 21 committees, and Republicans 17.)	Arthur V. Watkins (R)	Wallace F. Bennett (R)	2D	Harry S. Truman/ Alben W. Barkley (D) ✓
1952	J. Bracken Lee (R)	Heber Bennion Jr. (D)	Clinton D. Vernon (D)	Ferrell Adams (D)	Reece M. Reese (D)	16D, 7R	30D, 30R	Arthur V. Watkins (R)	Wallace F. Bennett (R)	2D	Dwight D. Eisenhower/ Richard Nixon (R) ✓
1953	J. Bracken Lee (R)	LaMont Toronto (R)	Sherman J. Preece (R)	Sid Lambourne (R)	E. R. Callister Jr. (R)	15R, 8D	39R, 21D	Arthur V. Watkins (R)	Wallace F. Bennett (R)	2R	Dwight D. Eisenhower/ Richard Nixon (R) ✓
1954	J. Bracken Lee (R)	LaMont Toronto (R)	Sherman J. Preece (R)	Sid Lambourne (R)	E. R. Callister Jr. (R)	15R, 8D	39R, 21D	Arthur V. Watkins (R)	Wallace F. Bennett (R)	2R	Dwight D. Eisenhower/ Richard Nixon (R) ✓
1955	J. Bracken Lee (R)	LaMont Toronto (R)	Sherman J. Preece (R)	Sid Lambourne (R)	E. R. Callister Jr. (R)	16R, 7D	33R, 27D	Arthur V. Watkins (R)	Wallace F. Bennett (R)	2R	Dwight D. Eisenhower/ Richard Nixon (R) ✓
1956	J. Bracken Lee (R)	LaMont Toronto (R)	Sherman J. Preece (R)	Sid Lambourne (R)	E. R. Callister Jr. (R)	16R, 7D	33R, 27D	Arthur V. Watkins (R)	Wallace F. Bennett (R)	2R	Dwight D. Eisenhower/ Richard Nixon (R) ✓
1957	George Dewey Clyde (R)	LaMont Toronto (R)	E. R. Callister Jr. (R)	Sherman J. Preece (R)	Sid Lambourne (R)	15R, 10D	39R, 24D, 1I	Arthur V. Watkins (R)	Wallace F. Bennett (R)	2R	Dwight D. Eisenhower/ Richard Nixon (R) ✓
1958	George Dewey Clyde (R)	LaMont Toronto (R)	E. R. Callister Jr. (R)	Sherman J. Preece (R)	Sid Lambourne (R)	15R, 10D	39R, 24D, 1I	Arthur V. Watkins (R)	Wallace F. Bennett (R)	2R	Dwight D. Eisenhower/ Richard Nixon (R) ✓
1959	George Dewey Clyde (R)	LaMont Toronto (R)	E. R. Callister Jr. (R)	Sherman J. Preece (R)	Sid Lambourne (R)	13R, 12D	42D, 22R	Frank Moss (D)	Wallace F. Bennett (R)	1D, 1R	Dwight D. Eisenhower/ Richard Nixon (R) ✓
1960	George Dewey Clyde (R)	LaMont Toronto (R)	E. R. Callister Jr. (R)	Sherman J. Preece (R)	Sid Lambourne (R)	13R, 12D	42D, 22R	Frank Moss (D)	Wallace F. Bennett (R)	1D, 1R	Richard Nixon/ Henry Cabot Lodge Jr. (R) ✗
1961	George Dewey Clyde (R)	LaMont Toronto (R)	Walter L. Budge (R)	Sharp M. Larsen (D)	Sherman J. Preece (R)	14D, 11R	36D, 28R	Frank Moss (D)	Wallace F. Bennett (R)	2D	Richard Nixon/ Henry Cabot Lodge Jr. (R) ✗
1962	George Dewey Clyde (R)	LaMont Toronto (R)	Walter L. Budge (R)	Sharp M. Larsen (D)	Sherman J. Preece (R)	14D, 11R	36D, 28R	Frank Moss (D)	Wallace F. Bennett (R)	2D	Richard Nixon/ Henry Cabot Lodge Jr. (R) ✗
1963	George Dewey Clyde (R)	LaMont Toronto (R)	Walter L. Budge (R)	Sharp M. Larsen (D)	Sherman J. Preece (R)	13R, 12D	34R, 30D	Frank Moss (D)	Wallace F. Bennett (R)	2R	Richard Nixon/ Henry Cabot Lodge Jr. (R) ✗
1964	George Dewey Clyde (R)	LaMont Toronto (R)	Walter L. Budge (R)	Sharp M. Larsen (D)	Sherman J. Preece (R)	13R, 12D	34R, 30D	Frank Moss (D)	Wallace F. Bennett (R)	2R	Lyndon B. Johnson/ Hubert Humphrey (D) ✓
1965	Cal Rampton (D)	Clyde L. Miller (D)	Phil L. Hansen (D)	Linn C. Baker (D)	Sharp M. Larsen (D)	15D, 12R	39D, 30R	Frank Moss (D)	Wallace F. Bennett (R)	1D, 1R	Lyndon B. Johnson/ Hubert Humphrey (D) ✓
1966	Cal Rampton (D)	Clyde L. Miller (D)	Phil L. Hansen (D)	Linn C. Baker (D)	Sharp M. Larsen (D)	15D, 12R	39D, 30R	Frank Moss (D)	Wallace F. Bennett (R)	1D, 1R	Lyndon B. Johnson/ Hubert Humphrey (D) ✓
1967	Cal Rampton (D)	Clyde L. Miller (D)	Phil L. Hansen (D)	Linn C. Baker (D)	Sharp M. Larsen (D)	23R, 5D	59R, 10D	Frank Moss (D)	Wallace F. Bennett (R)	2R	Lyndon B. Johnson/ Hubert Humphrey (D) ✓
1968	Cal Rampton (D)	Clyde L. Miller (D)	Phil L. Hansen (D)	Linn C. Baker (D)	Sharp M. Larsen (D)	23R, 5D	59R, 10D	Frank Moss (D)	Wallace F. Bennett (R)	2R	Richard Nixon/ Spiro Agnew (R) ✓
1969	Cal Rampton (D)	Clyde L. Miller (D)	Vernon B. Romney (R)	Golden L. Allen (R)	Sherman J. Preece (R)	20R, 8D	48R, 21D	Frank Moss (D)	Wallace F. Bennett (R)	2R	Richard Nixon/ Spiro Agnew (R) ✓
1970	Cal Rampton (D)	Clyde L. Miller (D)	Vernon B. Romney (R)	Golden L. Allen (R)	Sherman J. Preece (R)	20R, 8D	48R, 21D	Frank Moss (D)	Wallace F. Bennett (R)	2R	Richard Nixon/ Spiro Agnew (R) ✓
1971	Cal Rampton (D)	Clyde L. Miller (D)	Vernon B. Romney (R)	Golden L. Allen (R)	Sherman J. Preece (R)	16R, 12D	40D, 29R	Frank Moss (D)	Wallace F. Bennett (R)	1D, 1R	Richard Nixon/ Spiro Agnew (R) ✓
1972	Cal Rampton (D)	Clyde L. Miller (D)	Vernon B. Romney (R)	Golden L. Allen (R)	Sherman J. Preece (R)	16R, 12D	40D, 29R	Frank Moss (D)	Wallace F. Bennett (R)	1D, 1R	Richard Nixon/ Spiro Agnew (R) ✓
1973	Cal Rampton (D)	Clyde L. Miller (D)	Vernon B. Romney (R)	David L. Duncan (D)	David Smith Monson (R)	16R, 13D	44R, 31D	Frank Moss (D)	Wallace F. Bennett (R)	2D	Richard Nixon/ Spiro Agnew (R) ✓
1974	Cal Rampton (D)	Clyde L. Miller (D)	Vernon B. Romney (R)	David L. Duncan (D)	David Smith Monson (R)	16R, 13D	44R, 31D	Frank Moss (D)	Wallace F. Bennett (R)	2D	Richard Nixon/ Spiro Agnew (R) ✓
1975	Cal Rampton (D)	Clyde L. Miller (D)	Vernon B. Romney (R)	David L. Duncan (D)	David Smith Monson (R)	15D, 14R	41D, 34R	Frank Moss (D)	Jake Garn (R)	2D	Richard Nixon/ Spiro Agnew (R) ✓
1976	Cal Rampton (D)	Clyde L. Miller (D)	Vernon B. Romney (R)	David L. Duncan (D)	David Smith Monson (R)	15D, 14R	41D, 34R	Frank Moss (D)	Jake Garn (R)	2D	Gerald Ford/ Bob Dole (R) ✗
1977	Scott M. Matheson (D)	David Smith Monson (R)	Robert B. Hansen (R)	Linn C. Baker (D)	Richard Jensen (R)	17D, 12R	40R, 35D	Orrin Hatch (R)	Jake Garn (R)	1D, 1R	Gerald Ford/ Bob Dole (R) ✗
1978	Scott M. Matheson (D)	David Smith Monson (R)	Robert B. Hansen (R)	Linn C. Baker (D)	Richard Jensen (R)	17D, 12R	40R, 35D	Orrin Hatch (R)	Jake Garn (R)	1D, 1R	Gerald Ford/ Bob Dole (R) ✗
1979	Scott M. Matheson (D)	David Smith Monson (R)	Robert B. Hansen (R)	Linn C. Baker (D)	Richard Jensen (R)	19R, 10D	51R, 24D	Orrin Hatch (R)	Jake Garn (R)	1D, 1R	Gerald Ford/ Bob Dole (R) ✗
1980	Scott M. Matheson (D)	David Smith Monson (R)	Robert B. Hansen (R)	Linn C. Baker (D)	Richard Jensen (R)	19R, 10D	51R, 24D	Orrin Hatch (R)	Jake Garn (R)	1D, 1R	Ronald Reagan/ George H. W. Bush (R) ✓
1981	Scott M. Matheson (D)	David Smith Monson (R)	David L. Wilkinson (R)	Ed Alter (R)	W. Val Oveson (R)	22R, 7D	58R, 17D	Orrin Hatch (R)	Jake Garn (R)	2R	Ronald Reagan/ George H. W. Bush (R) ✓
1982	Scott M. Matheson (D)	David Smith Monson (R)	David L. Wilkinson (R)	Ed Alter (R)	W. Val Oveson (R)	22R, 7D	58R, 17D	Orrin Hatch (R)	Jake Garn (R)	2R	Ronald Reagan/ George H. W. Bush (R) ✓
1983	Scott M. Matheson (D)	David Smith Monson (R)	David L. Wilkinson (R)	Ed Alter (R)	W. Val Oveson (R)	24R, 5D	59R, 16D	Orrin Hatch (R)	Jake Garn (R)	3R	Ronald Reagan/ George H. W. Bush (R) ✓
1984	Scott M. Matheson (D)	David Smith Monson (R)	David L. Wilkinson (R)	Ed Alter (R)	W. Val Oveson (R)	24R, 5D	59R, 16D	Orrin Hatch (R)	Jake Garn (R)	3R	Ronald Reagan/ George H. W. Bush (R) ✓
1985	Norman H. Bangerter (R)	W. Val Oveson (R)	David L. Wilkinson (R)	Ed Alter (R)	Tom L. Allen (R)	23R, 6D	62R, 13D	Orrin Hatch (R)	Jake Garn (R)	3R	Ronald Reagan/ George H. W. Bush (R) ✓
1986	Norman H. Bangerter (R)	W. Val Oveson (R)	David L. Wilkinson (R)	Ed Alter (R)	Tom L. Allen (R)	23R, 6D	62R, 13D	Orrin Hatch (R)	Jake Garn (R)	3R	Ronald Reagan/ George H. W. Bush (R) ✓
1987	Norman H. Bangerter (R)	W. Val Oveson (R)	David L. Wilkinson (R)	Ed Alter (R)	Tom L. Allen (R)	21R, 8D	48R, 27D	Orrin Hatch (R)	Jake Garn (R)	2R, 1D	Ronald Reagan/ George H. W. Bush (R) ✓
1988	Norman H. Bangerter (R)	W. Val Oveson (R)	David L. Wilkinson (R)	Ed Alter (R)	Tom L. Allen (R)	21R, 8D	48R, 27D	Orrin Hatch (R)	Jake Garn (R)	2R, 1D	George H. W. Bush/ Dan Quayle (R) ✓
1989	Norman H. Bangerter (R)	W. Val Oveson (R)	Paul Van Dam (D)	Ed Alter (R)	Tom L. Allen (R)	22R, 7D	47R, 28D	Orrin Hatch (R)	Jake Garn (R)	2R, 1D	George H. W. Bush/ Dan Quayle (R) ✓
1990	Norman H. Bangerter (R)	W. Val Oveson (R)	Paul Van Dam (D)	Ed Alter (R)	Tom L. Allen (R)	22R, 7D	47R, 28D	Orrin Hatch (R)	Jake Garn (R)	2R, 1D	George H. W. Bush/ Dan Quayle (R) ✓
1991	Norman H. Bangerter (R)	W. Val Oveson (R)	Paul Van Dam (D)	Ed Alter (R)	Tom L. Allen (R)	19R, 10D	44R, 31D	Orrin Hatch (R)	Jake Garn (R)	2D, 1R	George H. W. Bush/ Dan Quayle (R) ✓
1992	Norman H. Bangerter (R)	W. Val Oveson (R)	Paul Van Dam (D)	Ed Alter (R)	Tom L. Allen (R)	19R, 10D	44R, 31D	Orrin Hatch (R)	Jake Garn (R)	2D, 1R	George H. W. Bush/ Dan Quayle (R) ✗
1993	Mike Leavitt (R) (Note: Resigned to become director of the Environmental Protection Agency.)	Olene Walker (R)	Jan Graham (D)	Ed Alter (R)	Tom L. Allen (R)	18R, 11D	49R, 26D	Orrin Hatch (R)	Bob Bennett (R)	2D, 1R	George H. W. Bush/ Dan Quayle (R) ✗
1994	Mike Leavitt (R)	Olene Walker (R)	Jan Graham (D)	Ed Alter (R)	Tom L. Allen (R)	18R, 11D	49R, 26D	Orrin Hatch (R)	Bob Bennett (R)	2D, 1R	George H. W. Bush/ Dan Quayle (R) ✗
1995	Mike Leavitt (R)	Olene Walker (R)	Jan Graham (D)	Ed Alter (R)	Tom L. Allen (R)	19R, 10D	55R, 20D	Orrin Hatch (R)	Bob Bennett (R)	2R, 1D	George H. W. Bush/ Dan Quayle (R) ✗
1995	Mike Leavitt (R)	Olene Walker (R)	Jan Graham (D)	Ed Alter (R)	Auston Johnson (R)	19R, 10D	55R, 20D	Orrin Hatch (R)	Bob Bennett (R)	2R, 1D	George H. W. Bush/ Dan Quayle (R) ✗
1996	Mike Leavitt (R)	Olene Walker (R)	Jan Graham (D)	Ed Alter (R)	Auston Johnson (R)	19R, 10D	55R, 20D	Orrin Hatch (R)	Bob Bennett (R)	2R, 1D	Bob Dole/ Jack Kemp (R) ✗
1997	Mike Leavitt (R)	Olene Walker (R)	Jan Graham (D)	Ed Alter (R)	Auston Johnson (R)	20R, 9D	55R, 20D	Orrin Hatch (R)	Bob Bennett (R)	3R	Bob Dole/ Jack Kemp (R) ✗
1998	Mike Leavitt (R)	Olene Walker (R)	Jan Graham (D)	Ed Alter (R)	Auston Johnson (R)	20R, 9D	55R, 20D	Orrin Hatch (R)	Bob Bennett (R)	3R	Bob Dole/ Jack Kemp (R) ✗
1999	Mike Leavitt (R)	Olene Walker (R)	Jan Graham (D)	Ed Alter (R)	Auston Johnson (R)	18R, 11D	54R, 21D	Orrin Hatch (R)	Bob Bennett (R)	3R	Bob Dole/ Jack Kemp (R) ✗
2000	Mike Leavitt (R)	Olene Walker (R)	Jan Graham (D)	Ed Alter (R)	Auston Johnson (R)	18R, 11D	54R, 21D	Orrin Hatch (R)	Bob Bennett (R)	3R	George W. Bush/ Dick Cheney (R) ✓
2001	Mike Leavitt (R)	Olene Walker (R)	Mark Shurtleff (R)	Ed Alter (R)	Auston Johnson (R)	20R, 9D	51R, 24D	Orrin Hatch (R)	Bob Bennett (R)	2R, 1D	George W. Bush/ Dick Cheney (R) ✓
2002	Mike Leavitt (R)	Olene Walker (R)	Mark Shurtleff (R)	Ed Alter (R)	Auston Johnson (R)	20R, 9D	51R, 24D	Orrin Hatch (R)	Bob Bennett (R)	2R, 1D	George W. Bush/ Dick Cheney (R) ✓
2003	Olene Walker (R) (Note: Lieutenant Governor ascended to governorship upon the resignation of their predecessor.)	Gayle McKeachnie (R)	Mark Shurtleff (R)	Ed Alter (R)	Auston Johnson (R)	22R, 7D	56R, 19D	Orrin Hatch (R)	Bob Bennett (R)	2R, 1D	George W. Bush/ Dick Cheney (R) ✓
2004	Olene Walker (R)	Gayle McKeachnie (R)	Mark Shurtleff (R)	Ed Alter (R)	Auston Johnson (R)	22R, 7D	56R, 19D	Orrin Hatch (R)	Bob Bennett (R)	2R, 1D	George W. Bush/ Dick Cheney (R) ✓
2005	Jon Huntsman Jr. (R) (Note: Resigned to become United States Ambassador to China.)	Gary Herbert (R)	Mark Shurtleff (R)	Ed Alter (R)	Auston Johnson (R)	21R, 8D	56R, 19D	Orrin Hatch (R)	Bob Bennett (R)	2R, 1D	George W. Bush/ Dick Cheney (R) ✓
2006	Jon Huntsman Jr. (R)	Gary Herbert (R)	Mark Shurtleff (R)	Ed Alter (R)	Auston Johnson (R)	21R, 8D	56R, 19D	Orrin Hatch (R)	Bob Bennett (R)	2R, 1D	George W. Bush/ Dick Cheney (R) ✓
2007	Jon Huntsman Jr. (R)	Gary Herbert (R)	Mark Shurtleff (R)	Ed Alter (R)	Auston Johnson (R)	21R, 8D	55R, 20D	Orrin Hatch (R)	Bob Bennett (R)	2R, 1D	George W. Bush/ Dick Cheney (R) ✓
2008	Jon Huntsman Jr. (R)	Gary Herbert (R)	Mark Shurtleff (R)	Ed Alter (R)	Auston Johnson (R)	21R, 8D	55R, 20D	Orrin Hatch (R)	Bob Bennett (R)	2R, 1D	John McCain/ Sarah Palin (R) ✗
2009	Gary Herbert (R)	Greg Bell (R)	Mark Shurtleff (R)	Richard Ellis (R) (Note: Resigned to work in the private sector.)	Auston Johnson (R)	21R, 8D	53R, 22D	Orrin Hatch (R)	Bob Bennett (R)	2R, 1D	John McCain/ Sarah Palin (R) ✗
2010	Gary Herbert (R)	Greg Bell (R)	Mark Shurtleff (R)	Richard Ellis (R)	Auston Johnson (R)	21R, 8D	53R, 22D	Orrin Hatch (R)	Bob Bennett (R)	2R, 1D	John McCain/ Sarah Palin (R) ✗
2011	Gary Herbert (R)	Greg Bell (R)	Mark Shurtleff (R)	Richard Ellis (R)	Auston Johnson (R)	22R, 7D	58R, 17D	Orrin Hatch (R)	Mike Lee (R)	2R, 1D	John McCain/ Sarah Palin (R) ✗
2012	Gary Herbert (R)	Greg Bell (R)	Mark Shurtleff (R)	Richard Ellis (R)	Auston Johnson (R)	22R, 7D	58R, 17D	Orrin Hatch (R)	Mike Lee (R)	2R, 1D	Mitt Romney/ Paul Ryan (R) ✗
2013	Gary Herbert (R)	Greg Bell (R)	John Swallow (R)	Richard Ellis (R)	John Dougall (R)	24R, 5D	61R, 14D	Orrin Hatch (R)	Mike Lee (R)	3R, 1D	Mitt Romney/ Paul Ryan (R) ✗
2014	Gary Herbert (R)	Spencer Cox (R)	Sean Reyes (R)	Richard Ellis (R)	John Dougall (R)	24R, 5D	61R, 14D	Orrin Hatch (R)	Mike Lee (R)	3R, 1D	Mitt Romney/ Paul Ryan (R) ✗
2015	Gary Herbert (R)	Spencer Cox (R)	Sean Reyes (R)	Richard Ellis (R)	John Dougall (R)	24R, 5D	63R, 12D	Orrin Hatch (R)	Mike Lee (R)	4R	Mitt Romney/ Paul Ryan (R) ✗
2016	Gary Herbert (R)	Spencer Cox (R)	Sean Reyes (R)	David Damschen (R)	John Dougall (R)	24R, 5D	63R, 12D	Orrin Hatch (R)	Mike Lee (R)	4R	Donald Trump/ Mike Pence (R) ✓
2017	Gary Herbert (R)	Spencer Cox (R)	Sean Reyes (R)	David Damschen (R)	John Dougall (R)	24R, 5D	62R, 13D	Orrin Hatch (R)	Mike Lee (R)	4R	Donald Trump/ Mike Pence (R) ✓
2018	Gary Herbert (R)	Spencer Cox (R)	Sean Reyes (R)	David Damschen (R)	John Dougall (R)	24R, 5D	62R, 13D	Orrin Hatch (R)	Mike Lee (R)	4R	Donald Trump/ Mike Pence (R) ✓
2019	Gary Herbert (R)	Spencer Cox (R)	Sean Reyes (R)	David Damschen (R)	John Dougall (R)	23R, 6D	59R, 16D	Mitt Romney (R)	Mike Lee (R)	3R, 1D	Donald Trump/ Mike Pence (R) ✓
2020	Gary Herbert (R)	Spencer Cox (R)	Sean Reyes (R)	David Damschen (R)	John Dougall (R)	23R, 6D	59R, 16D	Mitt Romney (R)	Mike Lee (R)	3R, 1D	Donald Trump/ Mike Pence (R) ✗
2021	Spencer Cox (R)	Deidre Henderson (R)	Sean Reyes (R)	David Damschen (R)	John Dougall (R)	23R, 6D	58R, 17D	Mitt Romney (R)	Mike Lee (R)	4R	Donald Trump/ Mike Pence (R) ✗
2022	Spencer Cox (R)	Deidre Henderson (R)	Sean Reyes (R)	Marlo Oaks (R)	John Dougall (R)	23R, 6D	58R, 17D	Mitt Romney (R)	Mike Lee (R)	4R	Donald Trump/ Mike Pence (R) ✗
2023	Spencer Cox (R)	Deidre Henderson (R)	Sean Reyes (R)	Marlo Oaks (R)	John Dougall (R)	23R, 6D	61R, 14D	Mitt Romney (R)	Mike Lee (R)	4R	Donald Trump/ Mike Pence (R) ✗
2024	Spencer Cox (R)	Deidre Henderson (R)	Sean Reyes (R)	Marlo Oaks (R)	John Dougall (R)	23R, 6D	61R, 14D	Mitt Romney (R)	Mike Lee (R)	4R	Trump/ Vance (R) ✓
2025	Spencer Cox (R)	Deidre Henderson (R)	Derek Brown (R)	Marlo Oaks (R)	Tina Cannon (R)	22R, 6D, 1Fwd (Note: Sen. Dan Thatcher left the Republican Party and joined the Utah Forward Party on March 7, 2025.)	61R, 14D	John Curtis (R)	Mike Lee (R)	4R	Trump/ Vance (R) ✓
2026	Spencer Cox (R)	Deidre Henderson (R)	Derek Brown (R)	Marlo Oaks (R)	Tina Cannon (R)	22R, 6D, 1Fwd	61R, 14D	John Curtis (R)	Mike Lee (R)	4R	Trump/ Vance (R) ✓
2027	Spencer Cox (R)	Deidre Henderson (R)	Derek Brown (R)	Marlo Oaks (R)	Tina Cannon (R)	21R, 8D	45R, 28D, 2I	John Curtis (R)	Mike Lee (R)	3R, 1D	Trump/ Vance (R) ✓

Key to party colors and abbreviations for members of the U.S. Congress and other politicians or officials
Alaskan Independence (AKIP) Know Nothing (KN) American Labor (AL) Anti-Jacksonian (Anti-J); National Republican (NR) Anti-Administration (AA) Anti-Masonic (Anti-M) Conservative (Con) Covenant (Cov)	Democratic (D) Democratic–Farmer–Labor (DFL) Democratic–NPL (D-NPL) Dixiecrat (Dix), States' Rights (SR) Democratic-Republican (DR) Farmer–Labor (FL) Federalist (F); Pro-Administration (PA)	Free Soil (FS) Fusion (Fus) Greenback (GB) Independence (IPM) Jacksonian (J) Liberal (Lib) Libertarian (L) National Union (NU)	Nonpartisan League (NPL) Nullifier (N) Opposition Northern (O); Opposition Southern (O) Populist (Pop) Progressive (Prog) Prohibition (Proh) Readjuster (Rea)	Republican (R) Silver (Sv) Silver Republican (SvR) Socialist (Soc) Union (U) Unconditional Union (UU) Vermont Progressive (VP) Whig (W)	Independent (I) Nonpartisan (NP)

== See also ==
- Politics of Utah
