= General Hansen =

General Hansen may refer to:

- Alfred G. Hansen (born 1933), U.S. Air Force four-star general
- Christian Hansen (general) (1885–1972), German Wehrmacht general of the artillery
- Erick-Oskar Hansen (1889–1967), German Wehrmacht general of the cavalry
- Harold D. Hansen (1904–1987), U.S. Marine Corps brigadier general
- Helge Hansen (general) (born 1936), German Army general
- Murray A. Hansen (fl. 1980s–2010s), U.S. Army National Guard brigadier general
- Ole Hansen (officer) (1842–1922), Norwegian Army general

== See also ==
- Roger Hanson (1827–1863), Confederate States Army brigadier general
- Thomas Grafton Hanson (1865–1945), U.S. Army brigadier general
- Halvor Hansson (1886–1956), Norwegian Army major general
- Attorney General Hansen (disambiguation)
