= Joseph Toronto =

Italian missionary (1818–1883)

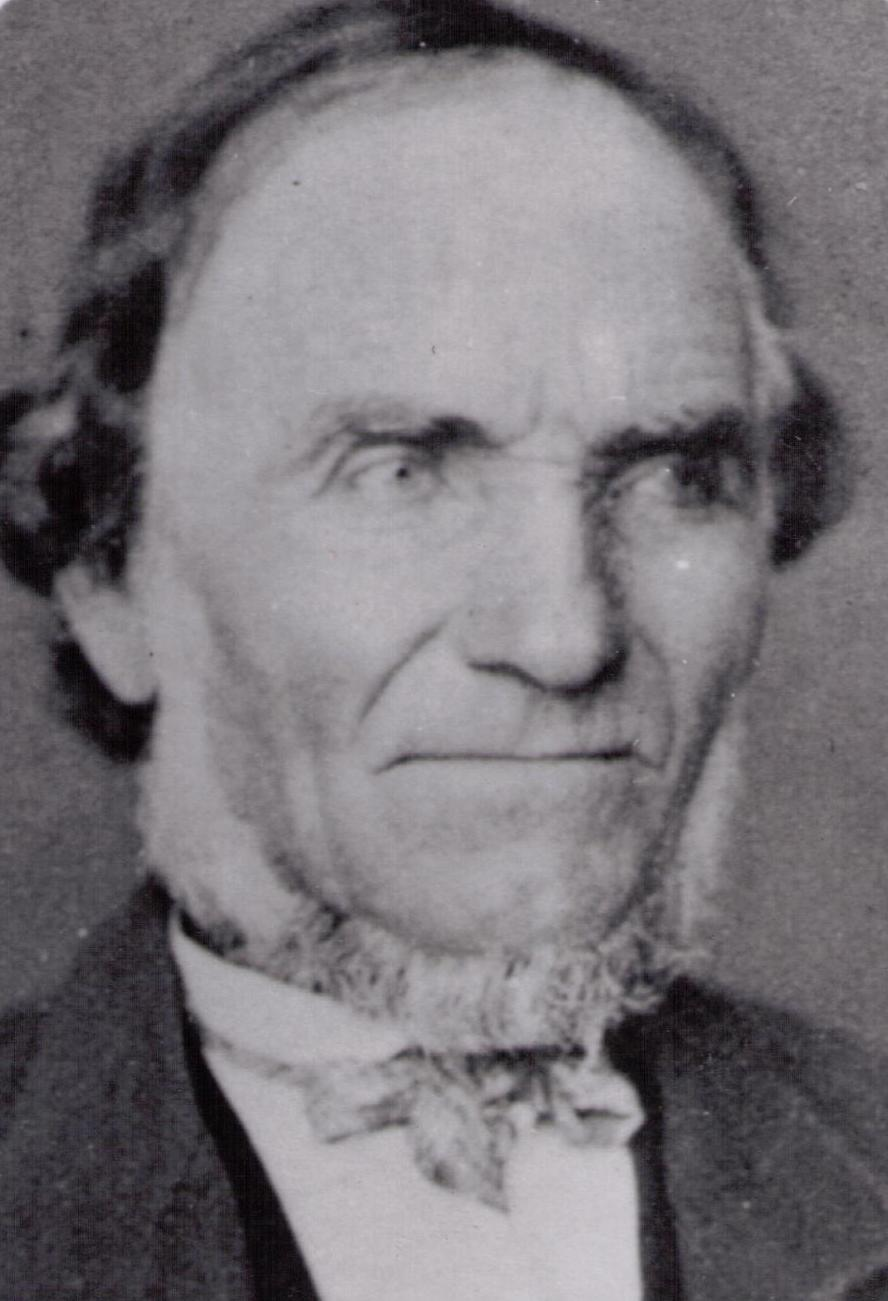
Joseph Toronto

Joseph Toronto (born Giuseppe Taranto) (June 25, 1818 – July 6, 1883) was the first Italian convert to the Latter Day Saint movement and was one of the first missionaries of the Church of Jesus Christ of Latter-day Saints (LDS Church) in Italy.

== Biography ==
Taranto was born in Cagliari, in Sardinia and was a sailor in the Mediterranean Merchant Marines and on trans-Atlantic freighters. While in Boston, Massachusetts in 1843, Toronto met Latter Day Saint missionaries, read the Book of Mormon (in English), and was baptized by George B. Wallace.

Shortly after joining the Latter Day Saint church, Toronto's ship collided with another, which almost resulted in Toronto's drowning. Toronto abandoned sailing and moved to Nauvoo, Illinois in 1845 to join the main gathering of Latter Day Saints. He donated his life's savings — nearly $2600 in gold coins — to the building of the Nauvoo Temple; Toronto's donation enabled work to continue after it had stalled due to lack of funds.

In 1848, Toronto emigrated as a Mormon pioneer from Illinois to Utah Territory and was the first Sardinian (coming from the Piedmont-Sardinia which would, in 1861, become Italy) to set foot in the Salt Lake Valley. In Utah, he was employed as the keeper of the church's cattle herds on Antelope Island in the Great Salt Lake.

In 1849, Toronto was ordained a seventy in the LDS Church. In 1850, he traveled with Lorenzo Snow and Thomas B. H. Stenhouse to England and then on to continental Europe and became the first LDS Church missionaries in Italy. Toronto and his associates met with little success due in part to opposition from the Italian media and government. In 1851, Snow and Toronto hired an Italian to translate the Book of Mormon into Italian, a project that was completed by 1852.

Toronto died in Salt Lake City, Utah Territory.

== Descendants ==
One of Toronto's sons, Joseph B. Toronto, served as a professor and vice president of the University of Utah.

Toronto's grandson Wallace F. Toronto served as president of the Czechoslovakia Mission of the LDS Church in absentia for 25 years as well as serving once as a missionary and twice more as mission president in Czechoslovakia. Joseph Toronto's grandson Lamont F. Toronto served as Secretary of State of Utah for 12 years, from 1952 to 1964. He also served in the Utah House of Representatives, and as the mission president in Canada (Ontario and Quebec) from 1965 to 1968.

Joseph's grandson (Wallace F. Toronto's younger brother) the late Joseph Young Toronto served in the first presidency of the Provo Temple (1971).
