= East High School (Utah) =

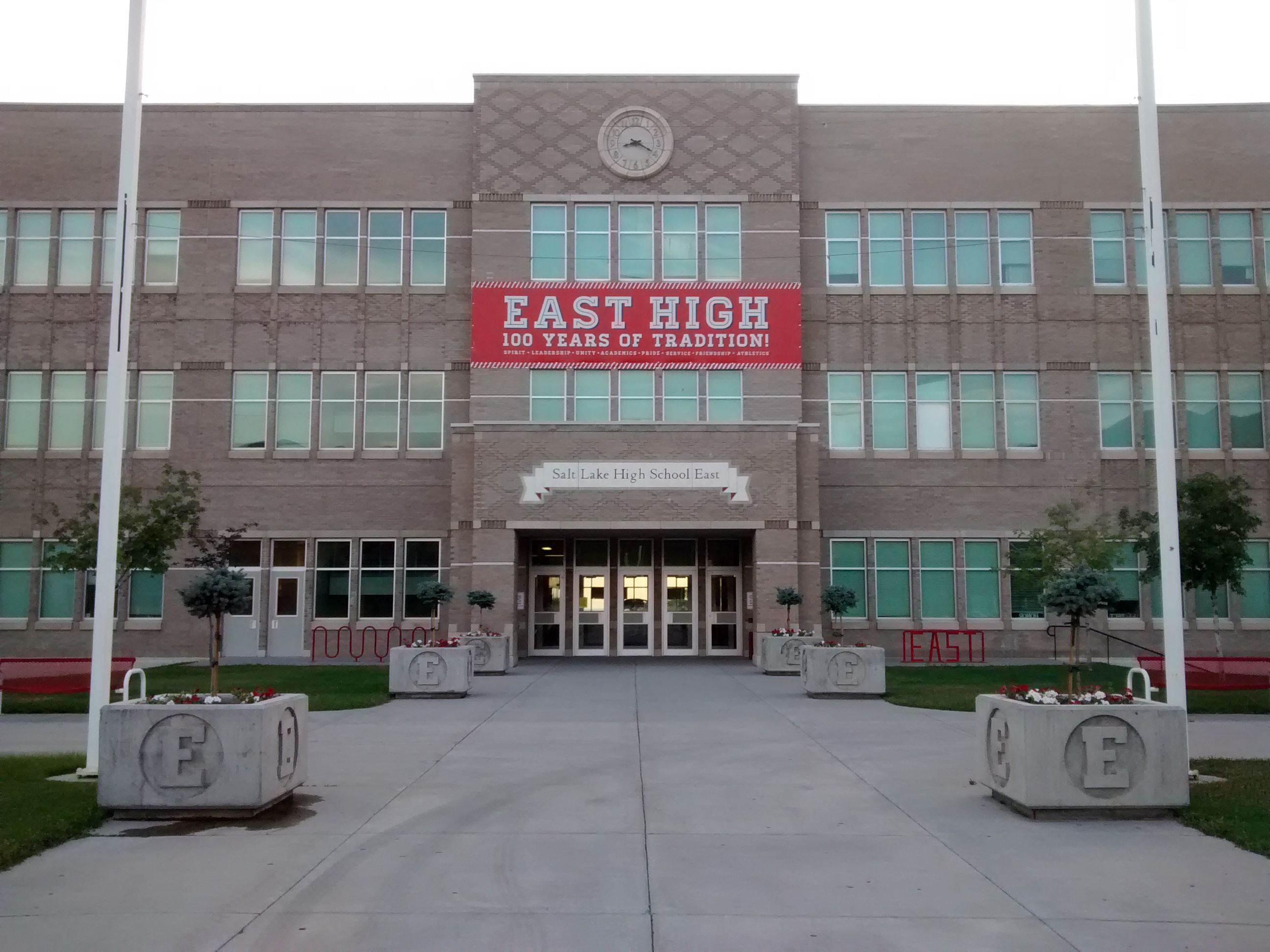

Location
- 1800 S XV3; Salt Lake City, Utah 84102; United States; 40°45′03″N 111°51′19″W

Information
- Type: Public high school
- Established: 1913; 113 years ago
- School district: Salt Lake City School District
- NCES School ID: 490087000486
- Principal: Ryan Oaks
- Teaching staff: 83.53 (on an FTE basis)
- Grades: 9–12
- Enrollment: 1,764 (2024–2025)
- Student to teacher ratio: 21.12
- Colors: White, red and navy
- Team name: Leopards
- Website: Official website

Salt Lake High School East or simply East High School is a public high school in the Salt Lake City School District in Salt Lake City, Utah, United States. It serves grades nine through twelve in general and special education. It is located at 840 South 1300 East in the East Bench neighborhood. The school is known for being a filming site of the High School Musical franchise.

== History ==
East High School was founded in 1913. In 1972, a fire destroyed the interior of the main building. The school's current structure was built in 1997.

Much of the Disney Channel film High School Musical and parts of its two sequels, High School Musical 2 and High School Musical 3: Senior Year, were filmed at East High. As a result, the school has become a destination for some tourists. In the summer of 2007, the school received 40 to 50 visitors per day who wanted to visit the location of the film. In November 2007, the school staged its own production of High School Musical. Demand for tickets was so strong that the school added an extra performance. The school is also the setting of the Disney+ show High School Musical: The Musical: The Series.

In 2017, the school re-purposed two locker rooms below the gymnasium and installed washing machines in order to accommodate homeless students. The non-profit organization Chapman-Richards Cares donated two washing machines and two dryers to the school. About 100 students at the time were homeless. In July 2017, a flood caused about $3 million in damages to the school.

== Notable alumni ==
- Roseanne Barr, actress, comedian, writer, producer, and director
- Jenny Oaks Baker, violinist
- Merrill Cook, former U.S. Representative
- Alyosha Efros, computer scientist
- Herman Franks, former professional baseball player and manager
- Patrick Fugit, actor
- Jake Garn, former U.S. Senator and astronaut
- Greg Grant, basketball player
- Josh Grant, basketball player
- Dee Hartford, actress
- Abby Huntsman, American journalist and television co-host
- Tyler Hughes, American football coach
- James Irwin, astronaut and eighth person to walk on the Moon
- Reed Jeppson, member of the school's football team, missing since 1964
- Bob Lewis, basketball player
- Edward D. Maryon, painter and educator
- Jim Matheson, former U.S. Representative
- Scott M. Matheson, former Governor of Utah
- Ritt Momney, singer
- Carol Ohmart, actress
- Bruce "Utah" Phillips, activist and musician
- Sione Po'uha, football player
- Vernon B. Romney, former Attorney General of Utah
- Ken Sansom, actor
- Elizabeth Smart, kidnapping survivor and activist
- Wallace Stegner, author
- Taki Taimani, professional football player, Minnesota Vikings
- Tang Wei-tsu, skier and businessman
- Stevie Tu'ikolovatu, football player
- Will Tukuafu, professional football player
- Paul Van Dam, former Attorney General of Utah
- Jaylen Warren, professional football player
- Steven C. Wheelwright, academic professor and leader
- Herb Wilkinson, basketball player
- Russell M. Nelson, surgeon and religious leader
