= William Thurman =

William Thurman may refer to:

- William E. Thurman (born 1931), United States Air Force general
- William Sims Thurman, (1931–2019) American classicist
- William T. Thurman (1908–2001), American attorney

== See also ==
- Bill Thurman (1920–1995), American film and television actor
