= Attorney General Barnes =

Attorney General Barnes may refer to:

- A. R. Barnes (1867–1944), Attorney General of Utah
- Clarence A. Barnes (1882–1970), Attorney General of Massachusetts

== See also ==
- General Barnes (disambiguation)
