= 1968 United States Senate election in Utah =

- November 5, 1968
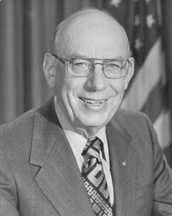

Nominee	Wallace F. Bennett	Milton L. Weilenmann
Party	Republican	Democratic
Popular vote	225,075	192,168
Percentage	53.68%	45.83%
- County results Bennett: 50–60% 60–70% 70–80% Weilenmann: 40–50% 50–60% 60–70% Tie: 40–50%
U.S. senator before election
Wallace F. Bennett
Republican
Elected U.S. Senator
Wallace F. Bennett
Republican

The 1968 United States Senate election in Utah took place on November 5, 1968. Incumbent Republican Senator Wallace F. Bennett won re-election to a fourth term.

== Primary elections ==
Primary elections were held on September 10, 1968.

=== Democratic primary ===
==== Candidates ====
- Phil L. Hansen, incumbent Attorney General of Utah
- Milton L. Weilenmann, State Economic Development Director

==== Results ====
Democratic primary results
Party	Candidate	Votes	%
Democratic	Milton L. Weilenmann	47,908	50.70
Democratic	Phil L. Hansen	46,579	49.30
Total votes		94,487	100.00

=== Republican primary ===
==== Candidates ====
- Mark E. Anderson, lawyer
- Wallace F. Bennett, incumbent U.S. Senator

==== Results ====
Republican primary results
Party	Candidate	Votes	%
Republican	Wallace F. Bennett (incumbent)	81,945	60.87
Republican	Mark E. Anderson	52,689	39.13
Total votes		134,634	100.00

== General election ==
=== Results ===
1968 United States Senate election in Utah
Party	Candidate	Votes	%
Republican	Wallace F. Bennett (Incumbent)	225,075	53.68
Democratic	Milton N. Weilenmann	192,168	45.83
Peace and Freedom	Utah Phillips	2,019	0.48
Majority		32,907	7.85
Turnout		419,262	
Republican hold			

== See also ==
- 1968 United States Senate elections

== Bibliography ==
- Congressional Elections, 1946-1996. Washington, D.C.: Congressional Quarterly Inc. 1998. ISBN 1-56802-248-4.
- Scammon, Richard M., ed. (1970). America Votes 8: a handbook of contemporary American election statistics, 1968. Washington, D.C.: Governmental Affairs Institute.
