= Attorney General Hansen =

Attorney General Hansen may refer to:

- Phil L. Hansen (1923–1992), Attorney General of Utah from 1965 to 1969
- Robert B. Hansen (1925–2005), Attorney General of Utah from 1977 to 1981

== See also ==
- Richard Hanson (Australian politician) (1805–1876), Attorney-General of South Australia
