= A. Pratt Kessler =

American politician (1905–1984)

12th Attorney General of Utah
- In office December 1961 – January 4, 1965
- Governor: George Dewey Clyde
- Preceded by: Walter L. Budge
- Succeeded by: Phil L. Hansen

United States Attorney for the District of Utah
- In office May 22, 1953 – 1961
- President: Dwight D. Eisenhower
- Preceded by: Scott Milne Matheson Sr.
- Succeeded by: William T. Thurman

Personal details
- Born: April 26, 1905; Salt Lake City, Utah
- Died: October 13, 1984 (aged 79); Salt Lake City, Utah
- Political party: Republican

A. Pratt Kessler (April 26, 1905 – October 13, 1984) was an American politician who served as the United States Attorney for the District of Utah from 1953 to 1961 and as the Attorney General of Utah from 1961 to 1965.

He died of cardiac arrest on October 13, 1984, in Salt Lake City, Utah at age 79.
