= Lamont Toronto =

Utah politician (1914–1971)

Secretary of State of Utah
- In office 1953–1963

Member of the Utah House of Representatives
- In office 1947

Personal details
- Born: Lamont Felt Toronto; February 21, 1914 Salt Lake City, Utah, U.S.
- Died: January 1971 (aged 56)
- Party: Republican
- Spouse: Helen Davidson (m. 1940)
- Parent(s): Albert Toronto; Minnie Etta Felt
- Relatives: Joseph Toronto (grandfather)
- Profession: Politician

Lamont Felt Toronto (February 21, 1914 – January 1971) was a Utah politician. He was Secretary of State of Utah from 1953 to 1963. He also served in the Utah state House of Representatives.

Toronto was a member of the Republican Party. He served in the Utah Legislature in 1947.

Toronto was a member of the Church of Jesus Christ of Latter-day Saints (LDS Church), a grandson of Joseph Toronto and the brother of Wallace F. Toronto. In 1914, Toronto married Helen Davidson (died 2009). From 1965 to 1968, Toronto served as president of the LDS Church's Canadian Mission, based in Toronto, Ontario. while presiding over the Canadian Mission Toronto also served on Canada's Centennial Planning Commission.
