= C. Nelson Day =

American attorney (1915–1974)

United States Attorney for the District of Utah
- In office 1969 – November 17, 1974
- President: Richard Nixon; Gerald Ford
- Preceded by: William T. Thurman
- Succeeded by: Ramon M. Child

Personal details
- Born: June 30, 1915; Fillmore, Utah
- Died: November 17, 1974 (aged 59); Mona, Utah
- Political party: Republican

C. Nelson Day (June 30, 1915 – November 17, 1974) was an American attorney who served as the United States Attorney for the District of Utah from 1969 to 1974.

He died in a car accident on November 17, 1974, in Mona, Utah at age 59.
