= 1976 Utah gubernatorial election =

- November 2, 1976
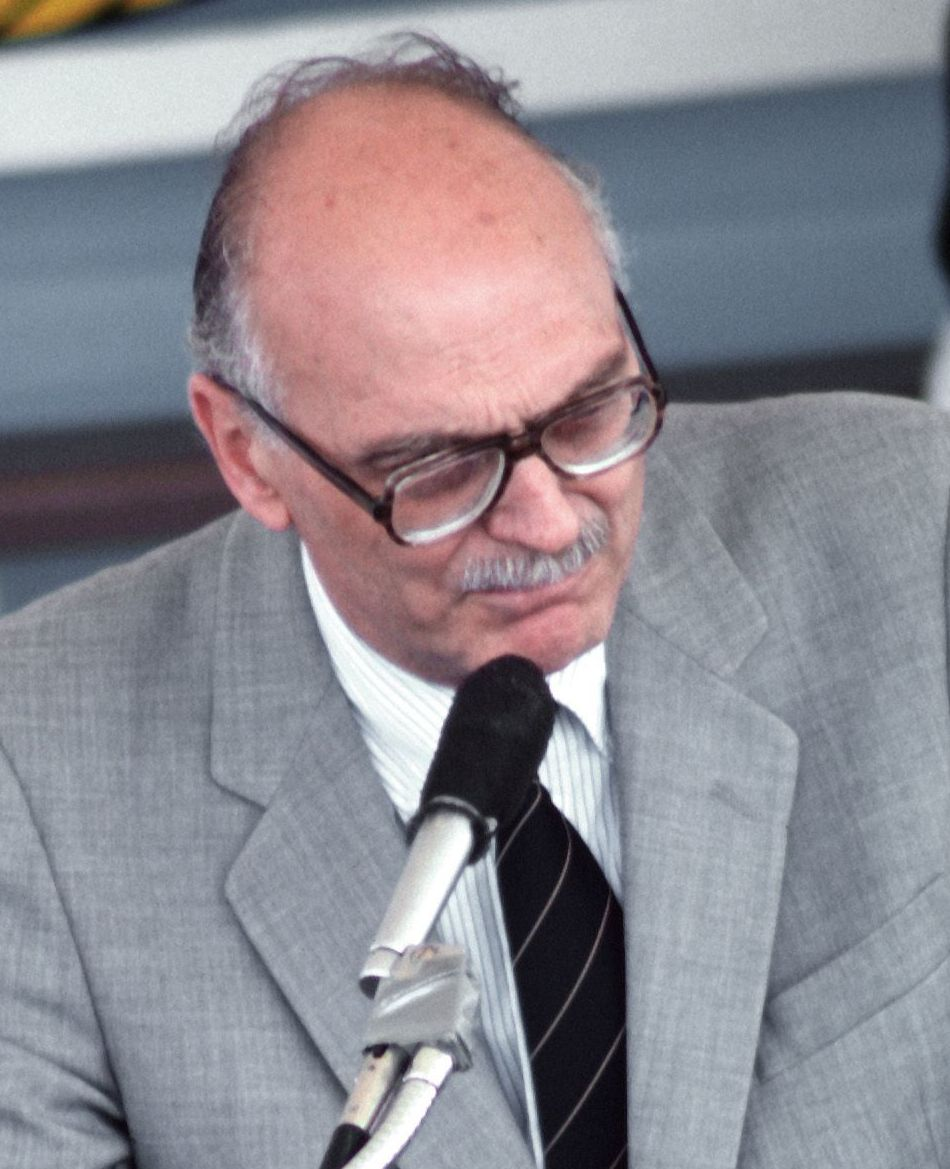

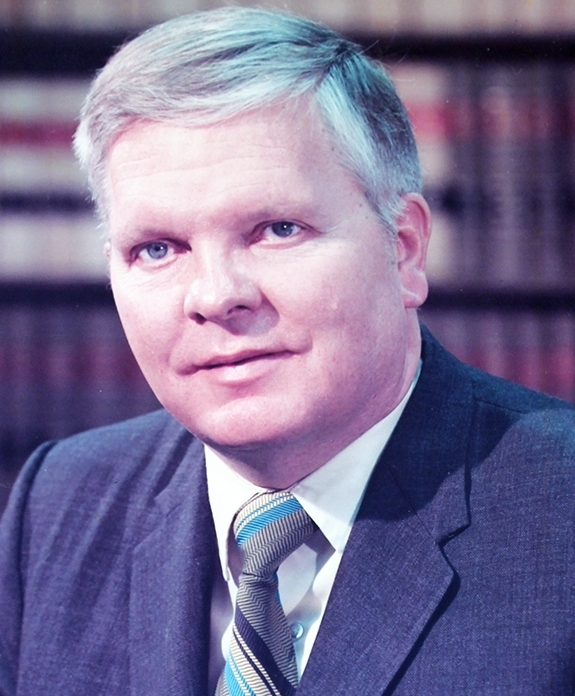
Nominee	Scott M. Matheson	Vernon B. Romney
Party	Democratic	Republican
Popular vote	280,706	248,027
Percentage	52.02%	45.96%
- County results Matheson: 50–60% 60–70% 70–80% Romney: 40–50% 50–60%
Governor before election
Cal Rampton
Democratic
Elected Governor
Scott M. Matheson
Democratic

The 1976 Utah gubernatorial election was held on November 2, 1976. Democratic candidate Scott M. Matheson defeated Republican nominee Vernon B. Romney, who had defeated Dixie L. Leavitt for his party's nomination, with 52.02% of the vote.

== Primary election ==
Primary elections were held on September 14, 1976.

=== Democratic primary ===
==== Candidates ====
- John P. Creer, attorney and Democratic nominee for Attorney General in 1968
- Scott M. Matheson, attorney and general counsel for Union Pacific Railroad

==== Results ====
Democratic primary results
Party	Candidate	Votes	%
Democratic	Scott M. Matheson	50,505	58.96%
Democratic	John P. Creer	35,154	41.04%
Total votes		85,659	100.00%

=== Republican primary ===
==== Candidates ====
- Dixie L. Leavitt, member of Utah State Senate
- Vernon B. Romney, Attorney General of Utah

==== Results ====
Republican primary results
Party	Candidate	Votes	%
Republican	Vernon B. Romney	87,251	53.40%
Republican	Dixie L. Leavitt	76,139	46.60%
Total votes		163,390	100.00%

== General election ==
=== Candidates ===
- Scott M. Matheson, Democratic
- Vernon B. Romney, Republican
- L. S. Brown, American Party
- Betty Bates, Concerned Citizens

=== Results ===
1976 Utah gubernatorial election
Party	Candidate	Votes	%	±%
Democratic	Scott M. Matheson	280,706	52.02%	−17.67%
Republican	Vernon B. Romney	248,027	45.96%	+15.64%
American	L. S. Brown	7,201	1.33%	
Concerned Citizens	Betty Bates	3,715	0.69%	
Total votes		539,649	100.00%	
Majority		32,679	6.06%	
Democratic hold		Swing	-33.31%	

=== Results by county ===
County	Scott M. Matheson Democratic		Vernon B. Romney Republican		L. S. Brown American		Betty Bates Concerned Citizens		Margin		Total votes cast
County	#	%	#	%	#	%	#	%	#	%	Total votes cast
Beaver	1,270	61.83%	760	37.00%	16	0.78%	8	0.39%	510	24.83%	2,054
Box Elder	5,681	42.19%	7,241	53.78%	465	3.45%	78	0.58%	-1,560	-11.59%	13,465
Cache	9,528	41.29%	12,713	55.10%	603	2.61%	230	1.00%	-3,185	-13.80%	23,074
Carbon	6,601	76.41%	1,971	22.82%	40	0.46%	27	0.31%	4,630	53.59%	8,639
Daggett	185	51.82%	164	45.94%	5	1.40%	3	0.84%	21	5.88%	357
Davis	22,420	47.58%	23,618	50.12%	564	1.20%	522	1.11%	-1,198	-2.54%	47,124
Duchesne	1,874	47.28%	1,941	48.97%	124	3.13%	25	0.63%	-67	-1.69%	3,964
Emery	2,180	60.25%	1,348	37.26%	72	1.99%	18	0.50%	832	23.00%	3,618
Garfield	774	43.95%	920	52.24%	56	3.18%	11	0.62%	-146	-8.29%	1,761
Grand	1,653	59.01%	1,100	39.27%	23	0.82%	25	0.89%	553	19.74%	2,801
Iron	3,878	56.95%	2,787	40.93%	117	1.72%	28	0.41%	1,091	16.02%	6,810
Juab	1,285	51.28%	1,172	46.77%	28	1.12%	21	0.84%	113	4.51%	2,506
Kane	663	44.23%	789	52.64%	41	2.74%	6	0.40%	-126	-8.41%	1,499
Millard	1,746	44.27%	2,046	51.88%	119	3.02%	33	0.84%	-300	-7.61%	3,944
Morgan	1,049	48.30%	1,065	49.03%	45	2.07%	13	0.60%	-16	-0.74%	2,172
Piute	284	42.97%	344	52.04%	33	4.99%	0	0.00%	-60	-9.08%	661
Rich	392	48.51%	407	50.37%	7	0.87%	2	0.25%	-15	-1.86%	808
Salt Lake	134,442	56.48%	100,346	42.16%	1,654	0.69%	1,593	0.67%	34,096	14.32%	238,035
San Juan	1,434	46.24%	1,592	51.34%	63	2.03%	12	0.39%	-158	-5.10%	3,101
Sanpete	2,650	44.81%	3,070	51.91%	163	2.76%	31	0.52%	-420	-7.10%	5,914
Sevier	2,307	41.01%	2,773	49.29%	510	9.07%	36	0.64%	-466	-8.28%	5,626
Summit	1,997	53.81%	1,638	44.14%	57	1.54%	19	0.51%	359	9.67%	3,711
Tooele	5,596	61.09%	3,432	37.47%	61	0.67%	71	0.78%	2,164	23.62%	9,160
Uintah	2,204	38.01%	3,334	57.49%	211	3.64%	50	0.86%	-1,130	-19.49%	5,799
Utah	29,693	41.94%	39,422	55.68%	1,244	1.76%	439	0.62%	-9,729	-13.74%	70,798
Wasatch	1,507	48.12%	1,582	50.51%	27	0.86%	16	0.51%	-75	-2.39%	3,132
Washington	3,335	38.79%	4,972	57.83%	227	2.64%	64	0.74%	-1,637	-19.04%	8,598
Wayne	392	42.06%	430	46.14%	106	11.37%	4	0.43%	-38	-4.08%	932
Weber	33,686	56.53%	25,050	42.04%	520	0.87%	330	0.55%	8,636	14.49%	59,586
Total	280,706	52.02%	248,027	45.96%	7,201	1.33%	3,715	0.69%	32,679	6.06%	539,649

==== Counties that flipped from Democratic to Republican ====
- Box Elder
- Cache
- Davis
- Duchesne
- Garfield
- Kane
- Millard
- Morgan
- Piute
- Rich
- San Juan
- Sanpete
- Sevier
- Utah
- Wasatch
- Washington
- Wayne
