= 1956 United States Senate election in Utah =

- November 6, 1956
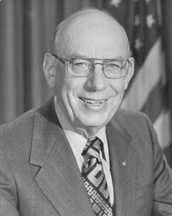

| Nominee | Wallace F. Bennett | Alonzo F. Hopkin |
| Party | Republican | Democratic |
| Popular vote | 178,261 | 152,120 |
| Percentage | 53.96% | 46.04% |
- County results Bennett: 50–60% 60–70% 70–80% Hopkin: 50–60% 60–70% 80–90%
U.S. senator before election
Wallace F. Bennett
Republican
Elected U.S. Senator
Wallace F. Bennett
Republican

The 1956 United States Senate election in Utah took place on November 6, 1956. Incumbent Republican Senator Wallace F. Bennett won re-election to a second term.

== Primary elections ==
Primary elections were held on September 11, 1956.

=== Democratic primary ===
==== Candidates ====
- Alonzo F. Hopkin, State Senator
- Herbert B. Maw, former Governor of Utah

==== Results ====
Democratic primary results
| Party | Candidate | Votes | % |
|---|---|---|---|
| Democratic | Alonzo F. Hopkin | 44,980 | 56.77 |
| Democratic | Herbert B. Maw | 34,246 | 43.23 |
| Total votes | | 79,226 | 100.00 |

=== Republican primary ===
==== Candidates ====
- Wallace F. Bennett, incumbent U.S. Senator, unopposed

==== Results ====
Republican primary results
| Party | Candidate | Votes | % |
|---|---|---|---|
| Republican | Wallace F. Bennett (incumbent) | unopposed | |

== General election ==
=== Results ===
1956 United States Senate election in Utah
| Party | Candidate | Votes | % |
|---|---|---|---|
| Republican | Wallace F. Bennett (Incumbent) | 178,261 | 53.96 |
| Democratic | Alonzo F. Hopkin | 152,120 | 46.04 |
| Majority | | 26,141 | 10.92 |
| Turnout | | 330,381 | |
| Republican hold | | | |

== See also ==
- 1956 United States Senate elections

== Bibliography ==
- Congressional Elections, 1946-1996. Washington, D.C.: Congressional Quarterly Inc. 1998. ISBN 1-56802-248-4.
- Scammon, Richard M., ed. (1958). America Votes: a handbook of contemporary American election statistics, 1956-57. New York: Governmental Affairs Institute.
