= 31st Utah Territorial Legislature =

The 31st Utah Territorial Legislature met in 1894. The regular election for the Territorial Council and the House of Representatives was held November 7, 1893.

== Session ==
The legislative session convened on January 8, 1894, in Salt Lake City, and ended on March 12, 1894. Unlike previous legislatures that typically met at City Hall, this body convened in the Wasatch building, using remodeled space that had previously served as the federal courthouse.

== Territorial Council ==
- President: M.A. Breeden
- Republican Party: 7
- Democratic Party: 5

=== Members ===
Name	Party	District	County
Charles Adams	Democratic	10	Iron
Hiram E. Booth	Republican	4	Salt Lake
John E. Booth	Republican	6	Utah
M. A. Breeden	Republican	2	Weber
Alma Eldredge	Republican	7	Summit
Alma T. Hague	Republican	5	Juab
Charles H. Hart	Democratic	1	Cache
Christian N. Lund	Democratic	8	Sanpete
John Seaman	Democratic	3	Weber
Orange Seely	Republican	9	Emery
Edward W. Taylor	Republican	4	Salt Lake
Parley L. Williams	Democratic	4	Salt Lake

== House of Representatives ==
- Speaker: Albion B. Emery
- Republican Party: 16
- Democratic Party: 8

=== Members ===
Name	Party	District	County	Notes
Clarence E. Allen	Republican	5	Salt Lake	
William H. Clark	Republican	15	Sevier	
Hugh M. Dougall	Republican	11	Utah	Seated January 18, 1894
Albion B. Emery	Republican	10	Summit	
Clarence W. Hall	Democratic	5	Salt Lake	Died December 2, 1893
Abram C. Hatch	Republican	14	Wasatch	
D. Clark Hubbard	Democratic	2	Box Elder	
Anthony W. Ivins	Democratic	17	Washington	
Jacob Johnson	Republican	13	Sanpete	
Curtis P. Mason	Republican	5	Salt Lake	
Charles R. McBride	Republican	9	Tooele	
David McKay	Republican	4	Weber	
Joseph Monson	Democratic	1	Cache	
John Moore	Democratic	12	Utah	
Aquila Nebeker	Democratic	1	Rich	
Maurice K. Parsons	Republican	5	Salt Lake	
Simeon G. Pigman	Republican	5	Salt Lake	
Orlando W. Powers	Democratic	5	Salt Lake	
Alexander G. Robertson	Democratic	11	Utah	Unseated January 18, 1894
Septimus W. Sears	Republican	8	Salt Lake	
Joseph Stanford	Republican	3	Weber	
David Stoker	Democratic	6	Davis	
John F. Tolton	Democratic	16	Beaver	
Charles S. Varian	Republican	5	Salt Lake	Elected January 4, 1894
Andrew J. Warner	Republican	3	Weber	
Ira D. Wines	Republican	7	Utah	

Based on the initial election results, the Republican majority in the House would only have been 14-10. However, the Republicans were able to increase their advantage when Clarence W. Hall, a Liberal who identified with the Democratic Party in national politics, died and was replaced in a special election by Charles S. Varian, a Liberal who identified as a Republican.

Meanwhile, the closest ballot involved two candidates from Springville in the 11th district. As initially certified by the Utah Commission overseeing the election, the result favored Democrat Alexander G. Robertson with 858 votes over Republican Hugh M. Dougall with 856 votes. Dougall protested the outcome because the county court had created a new precinct in Mapleton, which consisted of areas previously in the Springville precinct (in the 11th district) as well as Spanish Fork (in the 12th district). As Mapleton had voted heavily for Robertson (42-15), Dougall sought to have those votes thrown out as being cast in the wrong district, arguing the court lacked authority to redistrict, which could only be done by Congress or the Commission itself. For the purpose of certifying the election, the Commission concluded that it lacked jurisdiction to go behind the results as counted.

When it convened, the House established a committee on elections to revisit the question. The committee sent a special commissioner to investigate, who determined that 25 of the Mapleton ballots had been cast by voters living in the 12th district. Rather than attempt to inquire how those residents had voted individually, the committee deducted votes from each candidate proportionally based on how the Mapleton precinct voted overall, thus deeming the final result to be Dougall 849, Robertson 840.
