= Harvey H. Cluff (politician) =

American politician

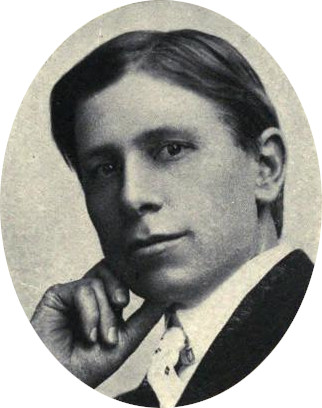

5th Attorney General of Utah
- In office January 3, 1921 – January 7, 1929
- Governor: Charles R. Mabey; George Dern
- Preceded by: Dan B. Shields
- Succeeded by: George P. Parker

Personal details
- Born: October 24, 1872 Provo, Utah
- Died: January 1, 1949 (aged 76) Salt Lake City, Utah
- Party: Republican

Harvey Harris Cluff (October 24, 1872 – January 1, 1949) was an American politician who served as the Attorney General of Utah from 1921 to 1929. He was the nephew of his namesake, Utah church and civic leader Harvey H. Cluff.
