= General Barnes =

General Barnes may refer to:

- Edward Barnes (British Army officer) (1776–1838), British Army lieutenant general
- Gladeon M. Barnes (1887–1961), U.S. Army major general
- James Barnes (general) (1801–1869), Union Army brigadier general and brevet major general
- Joseph Barnes (American physician) (1817–1883), Union Army brigadier general and brevet major general, 12th Surgeon General of the United States Army
- Reginald Barnes (1871–1946), British Army major general

== See also ==
- Alfred Smith Barnes (1817–1888), American publisher and philanthropist known as "the General"
- Attorney General Barnes (disambiguation)
