= Walter L. Budge =

American politician

11th Attorney General of Utah
- In office 1959 – December 10, 1961
- Governor: George Dewey Clyde
- Preceded by: E. R. Callister Jr.
- Succeeded by: A. Pratt Kessler

Personal details
- Born: March 6, 1906 Paris, Idaho
- Died: December 10, 1961 (aged 55) Salt Lake City, Utah
- Political party: Republican

Walter L. Budge (March 6, 1906 – December 10, 1961) was an American politician who served as the Attorney General of Utah from 1959 to 1961.

He died of internal bleeding on December 10, 1961, in Salt Lake City, Utah at age 55.
