= Dan B. Shields =

American politician (1878–1970)

United States Attorney for the District of Utah
- In office June 26, 1933 – 1949
- President: Franklin D. Roosevelt; Harry S. Truman
- Preceded by: Charles R. Hollingswroth
- Succeeded by: Scott Milne Matheson Sr.

4th Attorney General of Utah
- In office January 1, 1917 – January 3, 1921
- Governor: Simon Bamberger
- Preceded by: A. R. Barnes
- Succeeded by: Harvey H. Cluff

Personal details
- Born: August 9, 1878; Crawford County, Kansas
- Died: January 4, 1970 (aged 91); Salt Lake City, Utah
- Political party: Democratic

Dan B. Shields (August 9, 1878 – January 4, 1970) was an American politician who served as the Attorney General of Utah from 1917 to 1921 and as the United States Attorney for the District of Utah from 1933 to 1949.

He died on January 4, 1970, in Salt Lake City, Utah at age 91.
