= Vernon B. Romney =

American politician (1924–2013)

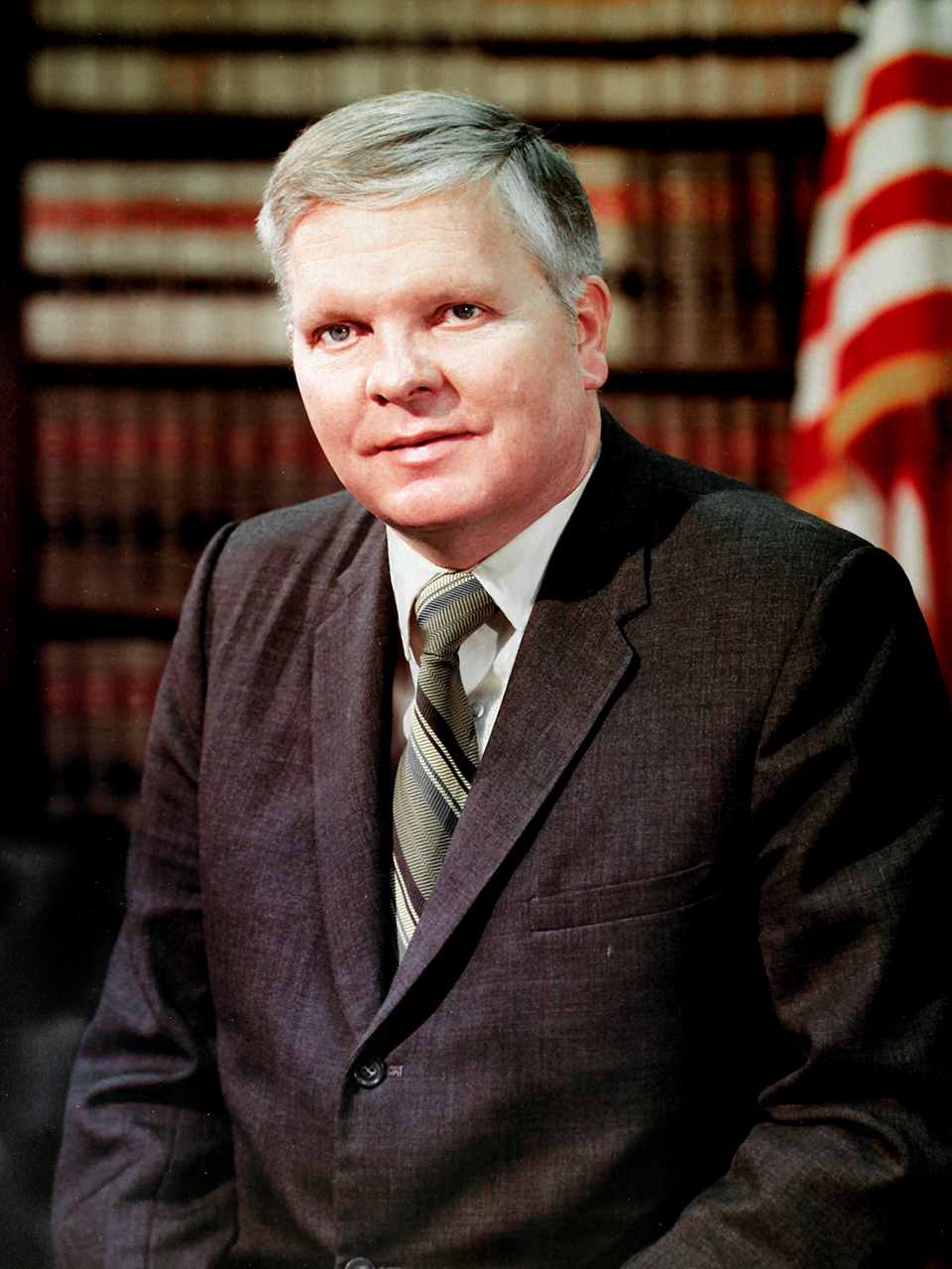

14th Attorney General of Utah
- In office January 6, 1969 – January 3, 1977
- Governor: Cal Rampton; Scott M. Matheson
- Preceded by: Phil L. Hansen
- Succeeded by: Robert B. Hansen

Personal details
- Born: Vernon Bradford Romney; April 27, 1924 Salt Lake City, Utah, U.S.
- Died: July 13, 2013 (aged 89) Salt Lake City, Utah, U.S.
- Party: Republican
- Spouse: Patricia Pingree (m. 1951)
- Children: 6
- Relatives: Romney family
- Education: University of Utah (BS); George Washington University (JD)
- Profession: Lawyer

Military service
- Allegiance: United States
- Branch/service: United States Army
- Unit: 96th Infantry Division
- Battles/wars: World War II

Vernon Bradford Romney (April 27, 1924 – July 13, 2013) was an American lawyer who served as the attorney general of Utah from 1969 to 1977, and the Republican candidate for Governor of Utah in 1976. He was a member of the Romney family and the Church of Jesus Christ of Latter-day Saints.

== Early life, military, and education ==
Romney was born to Vernon Romney (1896–1976) and Anna Lois Bradford (1900–1957) in Salt Lake City, Utah, the oldest of eight children. His father was an attorney and the chair of the Utah Republican party in 1944–50 and 1958–62. He is a first cousin of George W. Romney and a first cousin once removed to Mitt Romney. Romney graduated in 1941 from East High School.

Romney served in Okinawa and Leyte during World War II as an infantryman in the 96th Infantry Division as a radio operator and an assistant to a Methodist chaplain. He graduated with a BS in political science from the University of Utah and with a JD from George Washington University in 1953.

== Legal and political career ==
Romney worked as an attorney for the Federal Communications Commission and on the staff of Senator Arthur V. Watkins, both while in Washington, DC. He practiced law in Salt Lake City for fifteen years with the firms Romney and Nelson, and later Romney, Madsen, and Cummings. From 1955-1959 he was an Assistant Attorney General for the State of Utah. He was elected Attorney General of Utah in 1968, and was reelected to this position in 1972. He appeared before the U.S. Supreme Court in a case to obtain the mineral rights in the Great Salt Lake for the State of Utah, helped to improve airline service to the Salt Lake International Airport, increased consumer protection in the state of Utah, and was involved in efforts to reform federal habeas corpus laws. After a failed bid for Governor of Utah in 1976, Romney was the Highland, Utah City Attorney from 1977 to 1992.

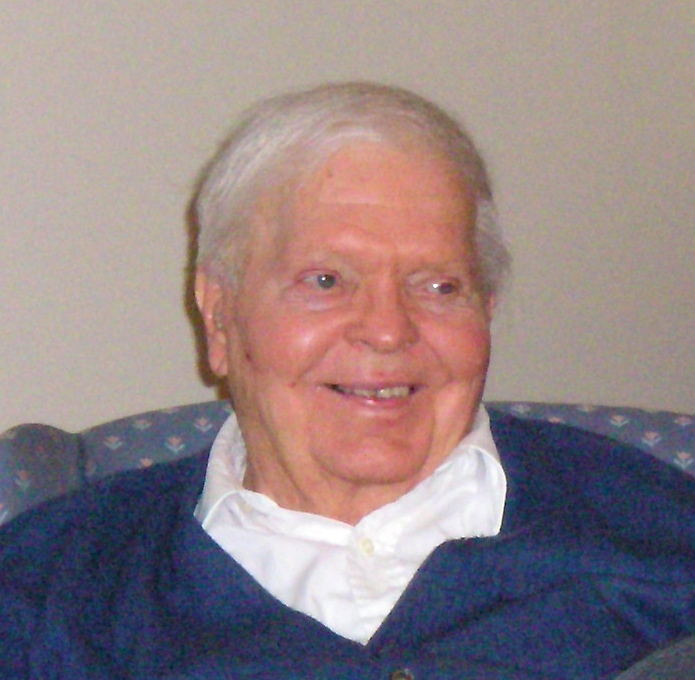
Romney in 2005

== Church service ==
Romney served a mission for the Church of Jesus Christ of Latter-day Saints (LDS Church) to Buffalo and Niagara Falls, New York from 1948 to 1950. He later served missions with his wife Pat to Charleston, West Virginia, from 1997 to 1998, and La Jolla, California, from 2001 to 2002.

== Family ==
Romney married Patricia (Pat) Pingree on December 29, 1951. In 1986, Pat was called as the national president of Lambda Delta Sigma, the LDS Church-sponsored sorority for college-age women. They are the parents to six children. They also have twenty-one grandchildren and, at the time of Romney's death, eleven great-grandchildren. He died on July 13, 2013 in Salt Lake City, Utah at the age of 89.

Party political offices
Preceded by Nicholas L. Strike	Republican nominee for Governor of Utah; 1976	Succeeded by Bob Wright
Legal offices
Preceded by Phil L. Hansen	Attorney General of Utah; 1977–1981	Succeeded by Robert B. Hansen
