= Alexander C. Bishop =

American politician

1st Attorney General of Utah
- In office January 6, 1896 – January 7, 1901
- Governor: Heber Manning Wells
- Succeeded by: M. A. Breeden

Personal details
- Party: Republican

Alexander C. Bishop was an American politician who served as the Attorney General of Utah from 1896 to 1901.
