= William T. Thurman =

American lawyer (1908–2001)

United States Attorney for the District of Utah
- In office April 10, 1961 – 1969
- President: John F. Kennedy; Lyndon B. Johnson; Richard Nixon
- Preceded by: A. Pratt Kessler
- Succeeded by: C. Nelson Day

Personal details
- Born: October 31, 1908 Provo, Utah
- Died: January 14, 2001 (aged 92) Salt Lake City, Utah
- Party: Democratic

William T. Thurman (October 31, 1908 – January 14, 2001) was an American attorney who served as the United States Attorney for the District of Utah from 1961 to 1969.

He died on January 14, 2001, in Salt Lake City, Utah at age 92.
