= Murray A. Hansen =

United States Air Force general

Murray A. Hansen is a brigadier general in the National Guard of the United States.

== Early life ==
Hansen was born in Seaford, Delaware. He attended Marist High School in Atlanta, Georgia and graduated from Lake Forest High School in Lake Forest, Illinois. After his graduation, he worked on the Chicago Board of Trade. He attended University of Kansas and graduated from Valdosta State University in 1987 and Liberty University in 2012.

== Career ==
In 1987, Hansen began training at Mather Air Force Base, Sacramento, California. The following year, he started undergoing B-52G training at Castle Air Force Base, Atwater, California. From 1989 to 1992, he was assigned to the 2d Bombardment Wing at Barksdale Air Force Base, Bossier City, Louisiana. There he was instructor in the Air Force's only dual nuclear and conventional qualified B-52 squadron. During this time, Hansen was deployed to serve in Desert Storm flying 11 combat missions for 156 flight hours from Moron, Spain.

Hansen studied electronic warfare at Ellsworth Air Force Base and B1-B training at Dyess Air Force Base before joining the Georgia Air National Guard and being assigned to the 116th Bomb Wing in 1996. With the exception of undergoing Air Battle Manager training at Tyndall Air Force Base, Florida in 2002, he remained with the 116th deploying twice in 2004 and 2005 flying E-8 Joint Stars missions in support of Operations Iraqi and Enduring Freedom. In late 2005, Hansen was selected to serve as the Director of Staff, Joint Force Headquarters, Georgia, Dobbins Air Reserve Base, Marietta, Georgia. He returned to the 116th in 2008 to serve as the Support Group Commander, 116 Air Control Wing. In 2011 Hansen was selected as the first Air National Guard Advisor to Chief, Air Force Reserve, Air Force Reserve Headquarters, Robins Air Force Base, Georgia. Hansen was promoted to Brigadier General in 2015 to serve as the Chief of Staff, Joint Force Headquarters, Wisconsin, Wisconsin Air National Guard, Madison, Wisconsin. After a brief stint as Chief of Staff, Joint Force Headquarters, Missouri, Missouri Air National Guard, Jefferson City, Missouri in late 2016, he went on to serve as Special Assistant to the Deputy Director, Air National Guard Pentagon. Then in 2017, Hansen was named Assistant Adjutant General, Joint Force Headquarters-HI, Hawaii National Guard, Diamond Head, Hawaii.

In 2019, Hansen held the role of Executive Vice President at American Data Solutions (ADS).

General Hansen's medals include three Meritorious Service Medal, the National Defense Service Medal, the Armed Forces Expeditionary Medal, the Southwest Asia Service Medal, the Global War on Terrorism Expeditionary Medal, the Global War on Terrorism Service Medal, the Air Force Overseas Short Tour Service Ribbon, the Air Force Expeditionary Service Ribbon, the Air Force Longevity Service Award, the Armed Forces Reserve Medal, the Air Force Training Ribbon, the Kuwait Liberation Medal (Saudi Arabia) and the Kuwait Liberation Medal (Kuwait).

== Education ==
- BS, Valdosta State University, Valdosta, GA
- Air War College, Montgomery, AL
- Joint Forces Staff College, National Defense University, Norfolk, VA
- MBA, Business, Management and Leadership, Liberty University, Lynchburg, VA
