= David L. Wilkinson =

American politician (1936–2022)

16th Attorney General of Utah
- In office January 5, 1981 – January 2, 1989
- Governor: Scott M. Matheson; Norman H. Bangerter
- Preceded by: Robert B. Hansen
- Succeeded by: Paul Van Dam

Personal details
- Born: David Lawrence Wilkinson; December 6, 1936; Washington, D.C., U.S.
- Died: December 10, 2022 (aged 86); Provo, Utah, U.S.
- Political party: Republican
- Spouse: Tricia Thomas
- Children: 4
- Parent(s): Ernest Leroy Wilkinson; Alice Ludlow Wilkinson
- Education: Brigham Young University; Oxford University; University of California, Berkeley
- Profession: Politician, lawyer

David Lawrence Wilkinson (December 6, 1936 – December 10, 2022) was an American politician and lawyer who served as the 16th Attorney General of Utah from 1981 to 1989 as a Republican.

== Early life and education ==
Wilkinson was born in Washington, D.C., on December 6, 1936, to Ernest Leroy and Alice Ludlow Wilkinson. Wilkinson's family moved to Provo, Utah, when his father became president of Brigham Young University.

Wilkinson obtained degrees from Brigham Young University, Oxford University, and the University of California, Berkeley.

== Career ==
Prior to entering politics, Wilkinson practiced law in California, Utah, and Washington, D.C.

In 1980, Wilkinson ran for Attorney General of Utah as a Republican, defeating incumbent Robert B. Hansen in the primary. Wilkinson won the general election in 1980 and re-election in 1984, defeating Park City attorney Joe Tesch. He served as the 16th Attorney General of Utah from 1981 to 1989.

=== Utah Cable Television Programming Decency Act ===
In 1983, during Wilkinson's time in office, the Utah State Legislature passed a controversial measure known as the Utah Cable Television Programming Decency Act, which limited the airing of R-rated movies to seven hours a day, between midnight and 7:00 a.m. Though Wilkinson spent up to $2 million defending the measure, the law was prevented from ever being enforced, and in 1987, by a 7-2 ruling, the law was declared unconstitutional by the United States Supreme Court due to being a violation of the First Amendment of the United States Constitution.

Following the Supreme Court's decision, Wilkinson voiced his disapproval of the verdict, stating, "While I regret the court's decision today, I do not regret my decision to pursue this matter to its ultimate resolution." Wilkinson also suggested that there would be another attempt to enforce the measure following changes to the Supreme Court.

Wilkinson ran for a third term as Attorney General in 1988, though his use of taxpayer money for his cable television feud resulted in an unsuccessful bid, as Wilkinson was defeated by Democrat Paul Van Dam in the general election by roughly 28,000 votes.

== Personal life and death ==
Wilkinson was married and had four children.

Wilkinson died in his sleep at his home in Provo on December 10, 2022, just four days after he had turned 86 years old.

Legal offices
Preceded by Robert B. Hansen	16th Attorney General of Utah; 1981–1989	Succeeded by Paul Van Dam
