= George P. Parker =

American politician

6th Attorney General of Utah
- In office January 7, 1929 – January 2, 1933
- Governor: George Dern
- Preceded by: Harvey H. Cluff
- Succeeded by: Joseph Chez

Personal details
- Born: March 27, 1885; American Fork, Utah, U.S.
- Died: February 17, 1937 (aged 51); Long Beach, California, U.S.
- Political party: Republican

George P. Parker (March 27, 1885 – February 17, 1937) was an American politician who served as the Attorney General of Utah from 1929 to 1933.

He died of a heart attack on February 17, 1937, in Long Beach, California at age 51.
