= M. A. Breeden =

American politician

2nd Attorney General of Utah
- In office January 7, 1901 – January 4, 1909
- Governor: Heber Manning Wells; John Christopher Cutler
- Preceded by: A. C. Bishop
- Succeeded by: A. R. Barnes

Personal details
- Born: February 27, 1847 Maysville, Kentucky
- Died: October 19, 1916 (aged 69) Redondo Beach, California
- Party: Republican

Marshall A. Breeden (February 27, 1847 – October 19, 1916) was an American politician who served as the Attorney General of Utah from 1901 to 1909.

Born in Kentucky, as a youth Breeden's family moved to Lexington, Missouri. However, being Unionists, they relocated after the First Battle of Lexington in 1861 to Decatur, Illinois. From there Breeden enlisted at age 17 in the 145th Illinois Infantry Regiment. As part of the Hundred Days Men, his unit had a relatively brief term of enlistment before he mustered out of service again.

After the Civil War, Breeden went to New Mexico where an older brother, William, had taken up the practice of law. While William Breeden worked in such capacities as clerk of the New Mexico Supreme Court and Attorney General of New Mexico Territory, M. A. Breeden (as he was generally known) secured an appointment as postmaster of Santa Fe. He also studied law himself and, during a second tenure of William's as Attorney General, was appointed as his brother's Assistant Attorney General.

In 1890, Breeden moved his family to Ogden, Utah, and began to practice law there. In 1893, he was elected to the 31st Utah Territorial Legislature, in which he served as the last President of the Territorial Council (the upper house of the legislature). As Utah prepared for statehood, he was a candidate at the Republican Party convention for one of the first seats on the Utah Supreme Court, but came in fourth behind the three judges who were ultimately elected to the court.

Trying again for statewide office, Breeden won the Republican nomination for Attorney General in 1900 and was elected, then re-elected in 1904. After two terms as Attorney General, Breeden retired to California, where he died on October 19, 1916, in Redondo Beach.
