= Paul Van Dam =

17th Attorney General of Utah
- In office 1989–1993
- Governor: Norman Bangerter
- Preceded by: Dan Wilkinson
- Succeeded by: Jan Graham

Personal details
- Born: October 15, 1937 (age 89) Salt Lake City, Utah, U.S.
- Party: Democratic
- Spouse: Mary Dawn Bailey
- Children: 5
- Education: University of Utah
- Occupation: lawyer

R. Paul Van Dam (born October 15, 1937) is an American politician and attorney from the state of Utah. He attended East High School and graduated in 1955. Paul and his wife Mary Bailey are fifth-generation Utahns. He served as Attorney General of Utah from 1989 to 1993, as a Democrat. He attended the University of Utah and is a former Salt Lake County district attorney.

Under District Attorney Van Dam's leadership, Salt Lake County DA's office was the first jurisdiction to prosecute serial killer Ted Bundy, subsequently getting a conviction.

Prior to his serving as DA, there were separate organizations for the county attorney and the district attorney. As DA, he oversaw a huge reorganization to combine the two.

In 1988, he ran for Utah Attorney General believing the office was under-funded and too small for the job. He was able to get the legislature to increase the budget, which enabled him to hire qualified attorneys and update the computer system making case handling more expedient and effective. He was a Democrat AG working with a Republican legislature.

Cold fusion at the University of Utah was a huge issue early in his term as AG. The state had to do whatever they could to protect the university's rights and interests in the process of cold fusion. Cold fusion ended up being a losing issue for the university but required a major effort by the AG's office.

An antitrust suit involving the University of Utah and medical services for children was another major case during his term. The university had been warned not to combine with a business that provided the same services but did so anyway, thereby making them the only providers. He pursued action against the university, incurring the wrath of the university. The case ran over into his successor's term for completion.

The abortion issue toward the end of his term proved very challenging when the state wanted to pass an anti-abortion law. He told them the law would be unconstitutional. As he was a Democrat, many did not want him involved. The state wanted to challenge the abortion issue but AG Van Dam argued it would be a waste of state dollars when case law indicated they would lose. The state hired an outside firm but ultimately failed in their efforts for the state.

During his term as AG he served as chair of the National Association of Attorneys General's antitrust committee.

A quote from Utah's Deseret News provides his public service philosophy:

"Throughout my life, including my service as attorney general, I have worked with people from both parties to solve problems and represent the people of Utah. I will establish that same dynamic in the Senate, where the needs and concerns of the people of Utah will always be my priorities."

Van Dam did not run for a second term. He did in 2004 run for U.S. Senate against then Senator Robert Bennett feeling that issues needed to be dealt with such as health care.

== Personal life ==
Van Dam was born on October 15, 1937, to Richard Warren Van Dam and Geraldine (Gerry) Slade Van Dam. He was raised in Salt Lake City and pursued music from an early age at the encouragement of his mother after his father bought him a guitar. He performed in many groups during his musical career and continued with his music during his retirement in Ivins, Utah where he performed for the Southern Utah Veterans Home and at fund raising events.

He was a member of the Church of Jesus Christ of Latter-day Saints (LDS Church) for a good deal of his life. In 1957 he served a missionary for the LDS Church in the Netherlands. There he witnessed how people lived in an “environmentally-friendly” manner and with great acceptance of different life-styles, which affected his philosophy of life from then on. Later in life, he resigned from the church.

During Paul's early years, he worked as an iron worker, following in his father's footsteps. That work taught Paul lessons: the value of the work, how hard it was, and that he didn't want to grow old doing it. Serving as a court reporter in a JAG unit during his military service caught his interest and led to his desire to attend law school.

Paul married Mary Lynne Palmer of Farmington, New Mexico in 1964. They divorced in 1982. They had two children, Michael Andrew and Julie Elizabeth. He has one grandson, Carson Janke. Paul retired in 1999. In 2004, Paul married Mary Dawn Bailey, who had three children from a previous marriage. Mary Dawn died in March 2007 after an 18-month bout with brain cancer.

Van Dam continued his public service in a variety of ways during his retirement and following his 2004 run for the U.S. Senate. His great love for and appreciate of the outdoors and Utah's public lands led him to be an outspoken advocate for public lands and related issues. After Mary Dawn's death in early 2007, Paul's retirement led him to Southern Utah where he became involved in conservation issues revolving around water and public land issues. He served as Executive Director of Citizens for Dixie's Future (later renamed Conserve Southwest Utah), from 2008 to 2010, ran for Washington County Commissioner in 2014 on a “conservation” platform in a very conservative area of Utah, and was called upon at various times to testify for Congress on these issues.

In 2016, after having resigned as executive director of the organization but remaining as an advisor, he was asked to give testimony at a Congressional hearing in St. George, Utah, before the Subcommittee on Federal Lands about a proposed road called the "Northern Corridor" through the Red Cliffs National Conservation Area, formerly part of the Red Cliffs Desert Reserve, a habitat created in 1996 for the protection of threatened and endangered species.

In 2018, Van Dam joined the CSU board. Soon after that the Northern Corridor issue was elevated from a local issue to the national level through legislation sponsored by Congressman Chris Stewart, H.R. 5597. Once again, Van Dam was called upon to testify and did so at a Washington, D.C., Congressional hearing May 22, 2018, before the Subcommittee on Federal Lands of the House Committee on Natural Resources.

In 2008 when he became Executive Director of CDF, he met board member Lisa Abel Rutherford. They spend their retirement years fighting conservation battles and enjoying their retirement years with his music. He shares his music with others in his Southern Utah community when asked to perform at events and does a monthly presentation at the Southern Utah Veterans Home.

Legal offices
Preceded by David L. Wilkinson	Attorney General of Utah; 1989–1993	Succeeded by Jan Graham
Party political offices
Preceded by Scott Leckman	Democratic nominee for U.S. Senator from Utah (Class 3); 2004	Succeeded by Sam Granato
