= Clinton D. Vernon =

American politician

9th Attorney General of Utah
- In office January 3, 1949 – January 5, 1953
- Governor: J. Bracken Lee
- Preceded by: Grover A. Giles
- Succeeded by: E. R. Callister Jr.

Personal details
- Born: April 22, 1907; Logan, Utah
- Died: September 16, 1987 (aged 80); Logan, Utah
- Political party: Democratic

Clinton D. Vernon (April 22, 1907 – September 16, 1987) was an American politician who served as the Attorney General of Utah from 1949 to 1953.
