= Olene Walker =

American politician (1930–2015)

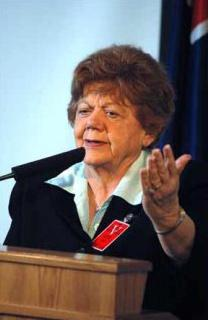
- Walker in 2005

15th Governor of Utah
- In office November 5, 2003 – January 3, 2005
- Lieutenant: Gayle McKeachnie
- Preceded by: Mike Leavitt
- Succeeded by: Jon Huntsman Jr.

4th Lieutenant Governor of Utah
- In office January 4, 1993 – November 5, 2003
- Governor: Mike Leavitt
- Preceded by: Val Oveson
- Succeeded by: Gayle McKeachnie

40th Chair of the National Lieutenant Governors Association
- In office 1999–2000
- Preceded by: Ronnie Musgrove
- Succeeded by: Steve Henry

Member of the Utah House of Representatives
- In office 1981–1989

Personal details
- Born: Olene Smith; November 15, 1930 Ogden, Utah, U.S.
- Died: November 28, 2015 (aged 85) Salt Lake City, Utah, U.S.
- Party: Republican
- Spouse: Myron Walker
- Children: 7
- Education: Brigham Young University (BA); Stanford University (MA); University of Utah (PhD)

Olene Walker (née Smith; November 15, 1930 – November 28, 2015) was an American politician who served as the 15th governor of Utah from 2003 to 2005, succeeding the governorship after Mike Leavitt's resignation.

A member of the Republican Party, Walker was Utah's first female lieutenant governor of Utah as well the first and currently only female governor.

She is also the shortest serving Governor of Utah, serving for only a year and two months.

== Early life and education ==
Walker was born Olene Smith in Ogden, Utah, in 1930 to Thomas Ole Smith and Nina (née Hadley) Smith, the second of their five children. She graduated from Weber High School. Walker received her bachelor's degree from Brigham Young University in 1953, her master's from Stanford University, and her doctorate in education administration from the University of Utah.

== Career ==
Walker's began her career in the Utah House of Representatives, including a term as Majority Whip, during which she helped create Utah’s Rainy Day Fund. She served in the Utah House from 1981 to 1989. She served as the fourth Lieutenant Governor of Utah for the 10 years prior to becoming governor. She founded the Salt Lake Education Foundation and served as its director. She served as director of the Utah Division of Community Development. She has chaired the Commission on Criminal and Juvenile Justice, the Utah State Housing Coordinating Committee, the Governor's Commission on Child Care, and the National Conference of Lieutenant Governors. She also became the first woman governor of Utah. Senator Orrin Hatch said Walker "truly paved the way for women in government in Utah." Also, throughout her political career "her passion across the board" was education.

=== Governorship ===
Walker assumed the office of Governor of the State of Utah after previous governor Mike Leavitt was nominated by President George W. Bush to lead the Environmental Protection Agency in 2003. Walker served as governor until the end of the term on January 3, 2005.

During her short term as governor, Walker focused on supporting education in Utah. She created the Read With a Child Early Literacy Initiative, visited classrooms often to read to children, and vetoed a proposal for vouchers for private schools with the reasoning that the proposal would take funding away from public schools. She also signed legislation ending the use of firing squads for execution in Utah and worked to preserve Utah wilderness and to create affordable housing.

In a move that caused a degree of controversy within the state, the Utah Republican Party at its convention on May 8, 2004, elected not to place Walker on the ballot for the party primary (held on June 22, 2004), selecting instead Jon Huntsman, Jr. and Nolan Karras as the two potential Republican party candidates for the office of Governor of the State of Utah, the first time in 48 years that an incumbent Utah governor failed to win a party nomination. Huntsman went on to win the primary election with more than 66% of the vote. These events effectively ruled out any possibility of Walker being on the ballot in the 2004 general election. Convention delegates defended their choice by claiming that many of the delegates were already pledged to other candidates, because Walker had served only six months as Governor before the party convention. She had also waited until two months before the nominating convention to choose to run for re-election, giving her rivals a head start to build their campaigns. She left office with an 87% approval rating.

=== Olene S. Walker Institute of Politics & Public Service ===
In 2012 Walker created the Olene S. Walker Institute of Politics & Public Service to "help foster in Weber State University students and the broader community the ideals of public service and political engagement that motivated her decades-long career in Utah politics." The Walker Institute coordinates internships for Weber State University students, holds public forums and debates on public policy issues, and provides leadership and engaged-citizenship workshops for students and the community at large.

== Personal life ==
Walker was married to Myron Walker; they had seven children. Walker and her husband were Latter-day Saints (Mormons). She and her husband served as International Affairs missionaries for The Church of Jesus Christ of Latter-day Saints in New York City. Starting in spring of 2010 she served as the Primary president in the Bloomington 7th Ward on the south side of St. George, Utah.

Olene Walker died of natural causes on November 28, 2015, thirteen days after her 85th birthday.

== Recognition ==
The State of Utah operates the Olene Walker Housing Loan Fund, which seeks to provide affordable housing throughout the state, renovate rural housing, protect tenants from landlords who seek to exploit them, and in other ways provide livable housing options to low income residents of the state.

In 2003, The Salt Lake Tribune named her Utahn of the Year.

In May 2010 the Utah County Democratic Party gave Walker its first distinguished service award.

Walker was one of the first co-chairs of the Utah Debate Commission.

Olene Walker Elementary School opened in 2020.

== See also ==
- List of female governors in the United States
- List of female lieutenant governors in the United States

Political offices
Preceded by Val Oveson	Lieutenant Governor of Utah; 1993–2003	Succeeded by Gayle McKeachnie
Preceded by Mike Leavitt	Governor of Utah; 2003–2005	Succeeded by Jon Huntsman
