= Gayle McKeachnie =

American politician (born 1943)

5th Lieutenant Governor of Utah
- In office November 5, 2003 – January 3, 2005
- Governor: Olene Walker
- Preceded by: Olene Walker
- Succeeded by: Gary Herbert

Member of the Utah House of Representatives

Personal details
- Born: January 26, 1943 (age 83)
- Party: Republican
- Profession: Civil servant

Gayle F. McKeachnie (born January 26, 1943) is an American Republican politician and was the fifth lieutenant governor of Utah from 2003 until 2005.

== Education ==
McKeachnie received his B.A. from the College of Southern Utah and his J.D. from the University of Utah. For a time, McKeachnie was an adjunct professor at Brigham Young University's J. Reuben Clark Law School.

== Public office ==
McKeachnie was elected to four terms in the Utah State House of Representatives. From 1985 to 1986 he served as the majority whip for the Republican Party. After his service in the state legislature, McKeachnie served as the chairman of the board of trustees for Utah State University.

It was while serving as a university trustee that McKeachnie became Utah's fifth Lieutenant Governor. In October, 2003, Utah Governor Michael O. Leavitt resigned his office, having been appointed to a position in the Bush Administration. Leavitt was succeeded by his lieutenant governor, Olene S. Walker, and to fill the vacancy that she had left in the office of Lieutenant Governor, Walker appointed McKeachnie.

The Walker–McKeachnie administration was short-lived, however. In May 2004, at the Utah State Republican Convention, Walker failed to win her party's nomination to seek a full term, and in January 2005, both she and her lieutenant governor left office.

== Today ==
Today, McKeachnie continues to be involved in Utah politics and policies. He is prominent in Utah as an expert on rural issues, including gas and oil-field discoveries. His expertise in both rural and energy issues makes him a highly sought-after advisor. McKeachnie served in the Huntsman administration as the leader of Rural Affairs and continues to do so in the Herbert administration. McKeachnie is also a close confidante of his successor as Lieutenant Governor, Gary Herbert, who served as Governor from 2009 to 2021.

McKeachnie also currently serves as a member of the Board overseeing the School and Institutional Trust Lands Association.

Political offices
Preceded by Olene Walker	Lieutenant Governor of Utah; 2003–2005	Succeeded by Gary Herbert
