= Grover A. Giles =

American politician (1892–1974)

8th Attorney General of Utah
- In office January 6, 1941 – January 3, 1949
- Governor: Herbert B. Maw
- Preceded by: Joseph Chez
- Succeeded by: Clinton D. Vernon

Personal details
- Born: October 7, 1892; Fillmore, Utah
- Died: November 26, 1974 (aged 82); Salt Lake City, Utah
- Political party: Democratic

Grover A. Giles (October 7, 1892 – November 26, 1974) was an American politician who served as the Attorney General of Utah from 1941 to 1949.

He died on November 26, 1974, in Salt Lake City, Utah at age 82.
