= Wallace F. Bennett =

American businessman and politician (1898–1993)

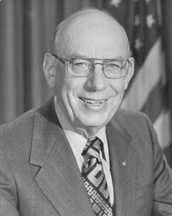

United States Senator from Utah
- In office January 3, 1951 – December 20, 1974
- Preceded by: Elbert D. Thomas
- Succeeded by: Jake Garn

Personal details
- Born: Wallace Foster Bennett; November 13, 1898 Salt Lake City, Utah, U.S.
- Died: December 19, 1993 (aged 95) Salt Lake City, Utah, U.S.
- Resting place: Salt Lake City Cemetery; 40°46′37.92″N 111°51′28.8″W
- Party: Republican
- Spouse: Frances Marion Grant
- Children: 5, including Bob
- Education: University of Utah

Military service
- Allegiance: United States
- Branch/service: United States Army
- Rank: Second lieutenant
- Battles/wars: World War I

Wallace Foster Bennett (November 13, 1898 – December 19, 1993) was an American businessman and politician. A member of the Republican Party, he served as a U.S. senator from Utah from 1951 to 1974. He was the father of Bob Bennett, who later held his father's seat in the Senate.

== Early life and education ==
Wallace Bennett was born in Salt Lake City, Utah, to John Foster and Rosetta Elizabeth (née Wallace) Bennett. His grandparents were English immigrants who came to the United States in 1868. He received his early education at local public schools and graduated from LDS High School in 1916. He then enrolled at the University of Utah, where he majored in English and won a varsity letter in debate.

After his military career, he returned to the University of Utah and earned his Bachelor of Arts degree in 1919. For a year after his graduation, he served as principal of San Luis Stake Academy in Manassa, Colorado.

=== Military career ===
Bennett, a member of the university's Reserve Officers' Training Corps, interrupted his college education to serve in the US Army during World War I. He was commissioned as a second lieutenant of the Infantry in September 1918 and was assigned as an instructor in the Student Army Training Corps at Colorado College.

== Family ==
In 1922, Bennett married Frances Marion Grant, the youngest daughter of Heber J. Grant (who served as President of the LDS Church from 1918 to 1945). The couple had three sons, Wallace, David, and Robert; and two daughters, Rosemary and Frances.

Frances served for a time as a member of the Primary General Board of the LDS Church.

== Business career ==
In 1920, Bennett returned to Salt Lake City and became an office clerk at Bennett's Paint and Glass Company, which his father had established. He was later advanced to cashier, production manager, and sales manager. He became secretary-treasurer of the company in 1929 and, after his father's death in 1938, became president and general manager. He served in that position until 1950, when he became chairman of the board. In 1938, the company completed what Bennett described as the most modern paint manufacturing plant in the West.

In addition to his work in his family's business, Bennett organized a Ford dealership, the Bennett Motor Company, and served as its president from 1939 to 1950. He also served as president of the Cardon Jewelry Company and of the National Glass Distributors Association; vice-president of Glayton Investment Company and of the National Paint, Varnish and Lacquer Association; and director of Zion's Savings Bank and Trust Company, the Utah Oil Refining Company, and the Utah Home Fire Insurance Company. In 1949, he was elected president of the National Association of Manufacturers. He spent his year-long tenure as president traveling the country and preached "the partnership of the men who put up the money, the men who do the work, and the men who tie the whole thing together."

He hosted a daily one-hour program, The Observatory Hour, on KSL (1932–1933), and was president of the Salt Lake Civic Opera Company (1938–1941) and the Salt Lake Community Chest (1944–1945). In 1935, he became treasurer of the Latter-day Saints Sunday School General Board. He directed the chorus of student nurses of LDS Hospital (1942–1948) and wrote the words to God of Power, God of Right, which is Hymn #20 in the 1985 Latter-day Saints Hymnal. He authored Faith and Freedom (1950) and Why I am a Mormon (1958).

== U.S. Senate ==
In March 1950, Bennett announced his candidacy for a seat in the United States Senate from Utah. After receiving the Republican nomination, he faced three-term Democratic incumbent Elbert D. Thomas in the general election. During the campaign, he accused Thomas of having communist positions and circulated pamphlets associating Thomas with communist organizations and figures. In November, he defeated Thomas by a margin of 54%–46%. He was subsequently re-elected to three more terms.

=== Silver problem ===
In the late 1950s, the US Treasury became a begrudging supplier of silver at $0.905 an ounce. Bennett warned that the lack of supply for the high demand would cause the deficit to fall on the Treasury Stocks. By 1961, the Treasury Stocks had unnecessarily been depleted. In 1963, the government had only 30 million ounces of free silver, but the annual coinage requirement for the United States was more than 75 million ounces. The price of silver per ounce was now $1.2929, but if the United States bought extra silver, the price would go above $1.29. The Silver Purchase Act of 1963 was supported by Bennett and repealed "existing silver purchase requirements and the transfer of tax of silver bullion." It also allowed the Federal Reserve to issue $1 and $2 notes to replace "silver certificates or the denominations thus making 1.6 billion ounces of silver available to the United States Treasury."

Bennett spoke at the Convention of the American Mining Congress in 1963 that declared the coin and silver problem had reached a catastrophic level. His views were faced with much criticism. Two years later, to function properly, the Treasury proposed a new set of coins. Bennett joined forces with the administration and worked on a solution, the Coinage Act of 1965, which he got through Congress to be enacted into law.

=== Leadership ===
During his 23 years in the Senate, Bennett earned a reputation as a conservative and a pro-business advocate by opposing government regulations and supporting right-to-work laws. He served as a member of the Senate Finance and Banking and Currency Committees, as well as the Joint Committee on Atomic Energy and Defense Production. Bennett was the vice chairman of Senate Ethics Committee. Bennett voted in favor of the Civil Rights Acts of 1957, 1960, 1964, and 1968, as well as the Voting Rights Act of 1965 and the confirmation of Thurgood Marshall to the US Supreme Court, but Bennett did not vote on the 24th Amendment to the U.S. Constitution. He also supported a measure that prohibited federal aid to schools that practiced racial discrimination. He opposed the Partial Nuclear Test Ban Treaty and the creation of Medicare. He also voted against the Equal Rights Amendment. He was also instrumental in bringing the Central Utah Project and the defense and aerospace industries to Utah. By the end of his political career, Bennett was the ranking Republican on Senate Banking, Housing and Urban Affairs Committee, and the Senate Finance Committee. He was "recognized as one of the nations leading fiscal and monetary experts."

Bennett declined to seek re-election in 1974 and resigned on December 20 of that year to let his elected successor, Jake Garn, take office early and gain seniority.

== Later life ==
After his departure from the Senate, Bennett returned to Salt Lake City, resumed his business pursuits, and served on a variety of boards. When his son Robert was elected to his former Senate seat in 1992, the elder Bennett said, "Bob and I have made Utah history. We are the first father and son combination to be elected to the U.S. Senate in this state."

=== Death and burial ===
Bennett died at his home in Salt Lake City at the age of 95. He is buried at Salt Lake City Cemetery.

== See also ==
- Bennett Amendment
- Wallace F. Bennett Federal Building

== Sources ==
- Bennett, Wallace F. Faith and Freedom: The Pillars of American Democracy, New York: Scribner, 1950.
- Bennett, Wallace F. Why I Am A Mormon, New York: T. Nelson, 1958.

Party political offices
| Preceded by Adam S. Bennion | Republican nominee for U.S. Senator from Utah (Class 3); 1950, 1956, 1962, 1968 | Succeeded by Jake Garn |
U.S. Senate
| Preceded by Elbert D. Thomas | U.S. senator (Class 3) from Utah; 1951–1974; Served alongside: Arthur V. Watkins, Frank Moss | Succeeded by Jake Garn |
