= David Smith Monson =

American politician

David Monson
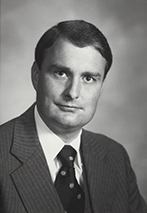

Member of the U.S. House of Representatives from Utah's 2nd district
- In office January 3, 1985 – January 3, 1987
- Preceded by: David Daniel Marriott
- Succeeded by: Wayne Owens

2nd Lieutenant Governor of Utah
- In office January 3, 1977 – January 7, 1985
- Governor: Scott M. Matheson
- Preceded by: Clyde L. Miller
- Succeeded by: W. Val Oveson

Personal details
- Born: David Smith Monson; June 20, 1945 (age 81) Salt Lake City, Utah, U.S.
- Party: Republican
- Spouse: Julie Johnson
- Children: 5
- Education: University of Utah (BS)

Military service
- Allegiance: United States
- Branch/service: Utah Air National Guard
- Years of service: 1967–1973
- Rank: Sergeant

David Smith Monson (born June 20, 1945) is an American politician and former U.S. Representative and the second lieutenant governor of Utah. He is a member of the Republican Party.

== Early life and education ==
Born in Salt Lake City, Utah, Monson attended public schools. He earned a B.S. from the University of Utah in 1970.

== Early career ==
He became a certified public accountant afterwards. He also served as a Sergeant in the Utah Air National Guard from 1967 to 1973.

== Political career ==
Monson was elected Utah State Auditor in 1972. He was one of only two Republicans to win a statewide office that year, the rest being taken by the Democrats. He served from 1973 to 1977. He then served as lieutenant governor of Utah for two terms, from 1977 to 1985.

=== Congress ===
In 1984, Monson ran for the United States House of Representatives for the Ninety-ninth Congress. He had a difficult race due to reports of his going on a trade mission to Japan along with a man who was later accused of spying and a developer who had been accused of defrauding investors. In the general election, he defeated former state Senator Frances Farley by a vote of 105,540 to 105,044. He was not a candidate for reelection in 1986, ending his political career on January 3, 1987 after serving only one term as a representative.

== Later career ==
He subsequently became a business executive involved in international trade and recycling paper. He currently resides in Salt Lake City.

Monson is a member of the Church of Jesus Christ of Latter-day Saints.

== Electoral history ==
1984 United States House of Representatives elections
Party	Candidate	Votes	%
Republican	David Smith Monson	105,540	49.37
Democratic	Frances Farley	105,044	49.13
Libertarian	Hugh A. Butler	1,456	0.68
Independent	James Waters	962	0.45
American	Maryellen Gardner	791	0.37
Total votes		213,793	100.0
Republican hold			

Political offices
Preceded by Clyde L. Miller	Lieutenant Governor of Utah; 1977–1985	Succeeded by W. Val Oveson
U.S. House of Representatives
Preceded by David Daniel Marriott	Member of the U.S. House of Representatives from Utah's 2nd congressional district 1985–1987	Succeeded by Wayne Owens
U.S. order of precedence (ceremonial)
Preceded by Walt Minnick as Former U.S. Representative	Order of precedence of the United States as Former U.S. Representative	Succeeded by Karen Shepherd as Former U.S. Representative
