= Clyde L. Miller =

American politician (1910–1988)

1st Lieutenant Governor of Utah
- In office 1975 – January 3, 1977
- Governor: Cal Rampton
- Succeeded by: David Smith Monson

Member of the Utah House of Representatives
- In office 1951–1952

Member of the Utah Senate

Personal details
- Born: January 1, 1910
- Died: September 14, 1988 (aged 78) Salt Lake City, Utah, U.S.
- Party: Democratic
- Education: University of Utah

Clyde L. Miller (January 1, 1910 – September 14, 1988) was a Democratic politician who was the first lieutenant governor of Utah. He remains the only Democrat to have served in this position.

== Biography ==
Miller was a member of the Church of Jesus Christ of Latter-day Saints (LDS Church). He began his involvement with politics at age 18, when he distributed materials in support of Democrat Al Smith's 1928 presidential campaign against Republican Herbert Hoover. He then held various leadership positions in the Utah Democratic Party and the Young Democrats of America and in city government.

From 1951 to 1952 Miller served in the Utah House of Representatives. Afterward he was elected to the Utah State Senate, representing the 4th Senate District in Salt Lake City. He was Senate Democratic Whip in 1961.

Miller began serving as Utah's Secretary of State in 1965. From 1974 to 1975 he served as president of the National Association of Secretaries of State. In 1976, the Utah Legislature passed a law that replaced the office of Secretary of State with the office of Lieutenant Governor. Miller thus served as the first Lieutenant Governor of Utah from 1976 to 1977, when his term ended. Miller was part of the administration of popular three-term Governor Cal Rampton. In 1968, he was the only Democrat besides Rampton to win statewide in Utah in a year where Richard Nixon carried Utah by nearly twenty points and Utah's strong Republican trend began.

At the time, the Lieutenant Governor's duties included serving as superintendent of the Capitol grounds. In this capacity, Miller ordered Capitol guards to keep their guns but not carry any bullets.

Miller died in 1988 at the age of 78.

Political offices
Preceded by None	Lieutenant Governor of Utah; 1975–1977	Succeeded by David S. Monson
