= Joseph Chez =

American politician

7th Attorney General of Utah
- In office January 2, 1933 – January 6, 1941
- Governor: Henry H. Blood
- Preceded by: George P. Parker
- Succeeded by: Grover A. Giles

Personal details
- Born: January 24, 1869; Richmond, Iowa
- Died: November 23, 1961 (aged 92); Medford, Oregon
- Political party: Democratic

Joseph Chez (January 24, 1869 – November 23, 1961) was an American politician who served as the Attorney General of Utah from 1933 to 1941.

He died on November 23, 1961, in Medford, Oregon at age 92.
