= W. Val Oveson =

American politician (born 1952)

3rd Lieutenant Governor of Utah
- In office January 7, 1985 – January 4, 1993
- Governor: Norman H. Bangerter
- Preceded by: David Smith Monson
- Succeeded by: Olene Walker

Personal details
- Born: Wilford Val Oveson; February 11, 1952 (age 74) Provo, Utah, U.S.
- Party: Republican
- Profession: Civil servant

Wilford Val Oveson (born February 11, 1952) is an American Republican Party politician in the state of Utah. Oveson has held several state offices in Utah, most notably the third lieutenant governor of Utah, and the federal office of National Taxpayer Advocate for the Internal Revenue Service. He resides in Bountiful, Utah.

== Biography ==
=== Early life and education ===
Oveson was born in 1952 in Provo, Utah and raised in Orem, Utah, where his father worked for Geneva Steel. He attended Brigham Young University and earned a degree in accounting. He became a certified public accountant, working for an Orem accounting firm for several years before starting his own accounting and auditing business.

=== Career ===
Oveson launched his political career with a successful run for Utah State Auditor in 1980. The Republican Party's presumptive nominee had been disqualified from running because he had not lived in Utah for the required five years. Oveson became the Republican nominee instead and soon became the youngest person elected to statewide office in Utah at the age of 28. His performance as State Auditor led Utah House of Representatives Speaker Norm Bangerter to say that he "audit[ed] like a junkyard dog."

In 1984, rather than running for re-election, Oveson became the running mate of Republican gubernatorial candidate Norm Bangerter. Bangerter and Oveson won the Republican primary in August 1984, overcoming the wealthy Congressman Dan Marriott's well-funded campaign, which was backed by party leaders. Next, in the general election, Bangerter and Oveson defeated the Democratic tandem of former Congressman Wayne Owens and Dale Carpenter, then the director of the state Department of Community and Economic Development. Bangerter and Oveson received about 56% of the vote. They were narrowly re-elected in 1988. As lieutenant governor, Oveson directed a statewide performance audit aimed at reducing the cost of government. In 1990, Utah was named "Best Managed State" by Financial World.

Soon after his second term expired, Oveson was appointed Chairman of the Utah State Tax Commission in 1993 by Governor Mike Leavitt. In this capacity he redesigned the computer systems and processes for the commission and created the Utah Tax Law Library on CD-ROM. He served in this position until 1998, when he was appointed the first head of the Office of the Taxpayer Advocate; this position had been created by legislation passed by Congress in 1996. In this role, Oveson led 2,300 employees in 74 locations across the U.S., reported independently to Congress on problems facing America's taxpayers, and recommended administrative and legislative solutions to stop the problems from recurring.

In 2000, Oveson joined PricewaterhouseCoopers, where he was a managing director and lead of the knowledge management function for the state and local tax group. He was based in Washington, D.C. In 2003, Governor Leavitt selected Oveson as Utah's Chief Information Officer. Oveson was confirmed by the Utah Senate and served until the end of Leavitt's term. In 2004, during his tenure as state CIO, Oveson was named one of the Public Officials of the Year by Governing Magazine for his work in eGovernment.

Oveson returned to the private sector after leaving the state government. He is currently a partner with Utah's largest accounting firm, WSRP, LLC, Accountant's and Business Consultants.

Political offices
Preceded by David Smith Monson	Lieutenant Governor of Utah; 1985-1993	Succeeded by Olene Smith Walker
