= Robert B. Hansen =

American politician

15th Attorney General of Utah
- In office January 3, 1977 – January 5, 1981
- Governor: Scott M. Matheson
- Preceded by: Vernon B. Romney
- Succeeded by: David L. Wilkinson

Personal details
- Born: August 13, 1925; Pocatello, Idaho
- Died: December 25, 2005 (aged 80); Salt Lake City, Utah
- Political party: Republican

Robert B. Hansen (August 13, 1925 – December 25, 2005) was an American politician who served as the Attorney General of Utah from 1977 to 1981.

Although born in Idaho, Hansen was raised in Merced, California. During World War II he joined the navy and studied at the University of New Mexico. He then went to the University of California, Hastings College of Law. He moved to Salt Lake City in 1950 where he began to practice law. He became assistant attorney general of Utah in 1969.

He died on December 25, 2005, in Salt Lake City, Utah at age 80. Hansen was attorney general at the time of the execution of Gary Gilmore.

Hansen was a member of the Church of Jesus Christ of Latter-day Saints. He served as bishop of the Monument Park 7th ward on the east side of Salt Lake City.
