= A. R. Barnes =

American politician

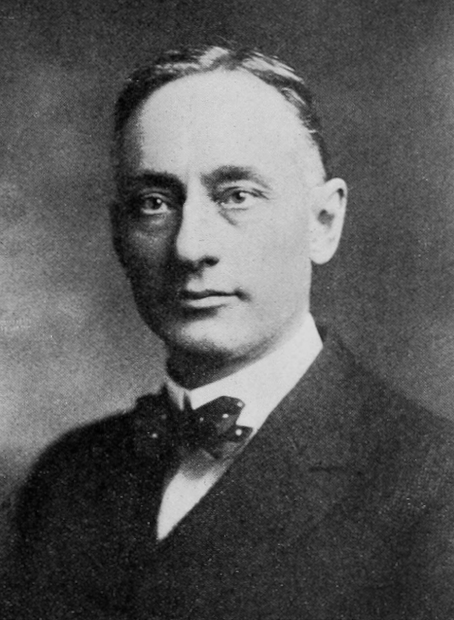

3rd Attorney General of Utah
- In office January 4, 1909 – January 1, 1917
- Governor: William Spry
- Preceded by: M. A. Breeden
- Succeeded by: Dan B. Shields

Personal details
- Born: Albert Raymond Barnes; March 9, 1867 Attica, Indiana, US
- Died: July 20, 1944 (aged 77) Hollywood, California, US
- Party: Republican
- Spouse: Josephine C. Naisbitt (m. 1907)
- Children: 2
- Education: Northwestern University; University of Michigan Law School (LLB)

Albert Raymond Barnes (March 9, 1867 – July 20, 1944) was an American politician who served as the Attorney General of Utah from 1909 to 1917.

== Education and career ==
Born in Attica, Indiana, Barnes graduated from Northwestern University, and then received an LL.B. from the University of Michigan Law School in 1899. He established a private practice in Salt Lake City, Utah, until 1908, when he was appointed a deputy attorney general. The following year, he became attorney general of the state, remaining in that office until 1917. He then returned to private practice until 1920, when he was elected as a judge of Utah's third judicial district. He left that position in 1924, again returning to private practice.

== Personal life and death ==
Barnes married Josephine C. Naisbitt in Salt Lake City on June 22, 1907, with whom he had two sons.

Barnes retired to Hollywood, California, where he died at his home at the age of 77.
