= Phil L. Hansen =

American politician

13th Attorney General of Utah
- In office January 4, 1965 – January 6, 1969
- Governor: Cal Rampton
- Preceded by: A. Pratt Kessler
- Succeeded by: Vernon B. Romney

Personal details
- Born: September 5, 1923 Park City, Utah
- Died: August 3, 1992 (aged 68) Murray, Utah
- Party: Democratic

Phil L. Hansen (September 5, 1923 – August 3, 1992) was an American politician who served as the Attorney General of Utah from 1965 to 1969. He served in the United States military during World War II.

== Tenure as Attorney General ==
Hansen was a controversial figure in Utah politics, while in office he often had public tax troubles and clashes with the IRS.

Hansen was also accused of taking advantage of a state program to buy cars for its elected officials by ordering a Jaguar. He defended the action, however, by saying that Jaguars have good resale value and that he was saving the state money.

Hansen left his office to campaign for the Democratic nomination for U.S. Senate in 1968. He would go on to narrowly lose in the primary to Milton Weilenmann.

== Later Life ==
Outside of politics Hansen was a notable defense attorney and he was president of the Utah Criminal Law Section and American Board of Trial Lawyers.

In June of 1992 Hansen was stripped of his law license by the U.S. Supreme court on account of allegations that he neglected clients.

He died of heart failure on August 3, 1992, in Murray, Utah at age 68.
