= Lieutenant Governor of Utah =

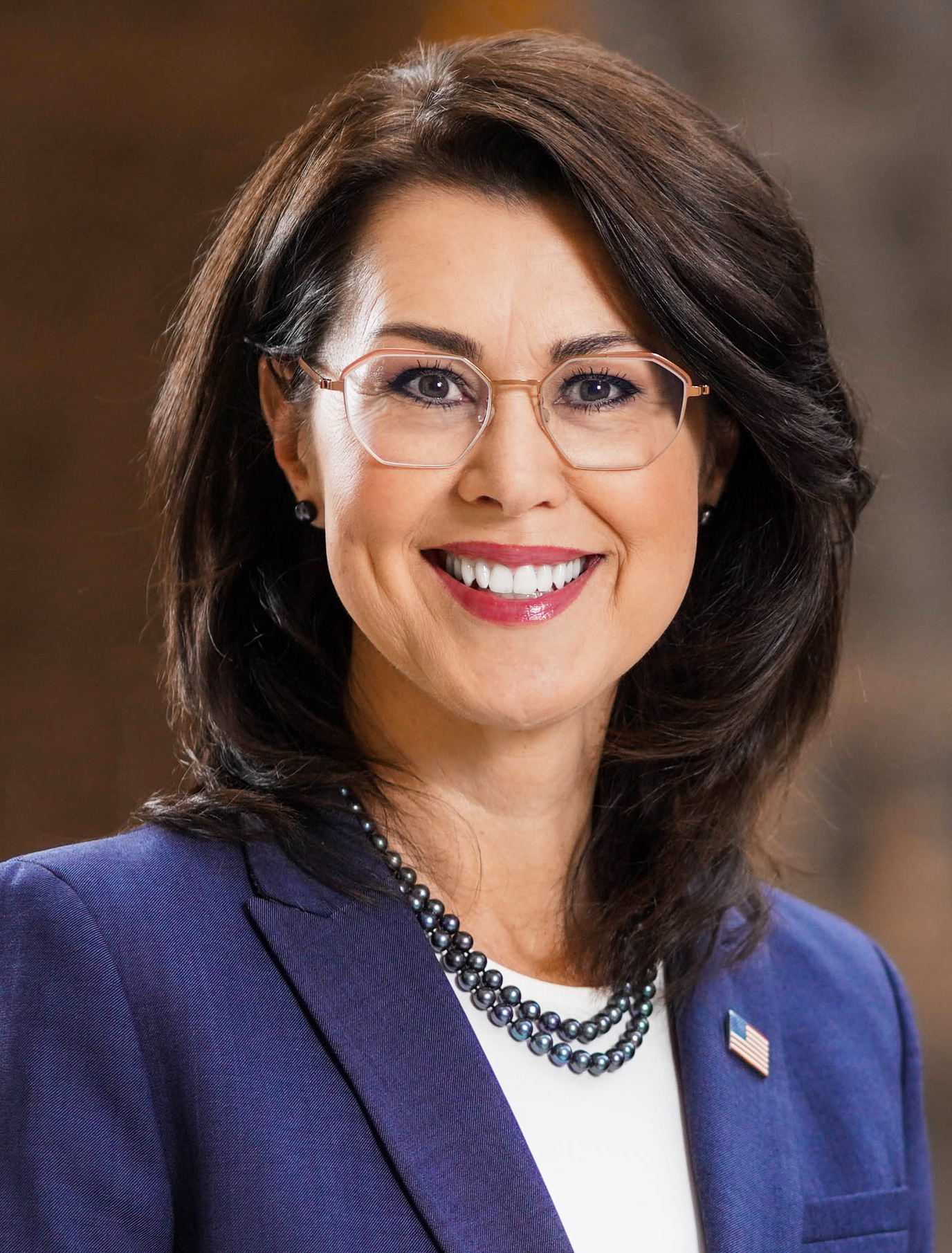
- Incumbent; Deidre Henderson since January 4, 2021
- Type: Lieutenant governor
- Formation: 1975
- First holder: Clyde L. Miller

The office of the lieutenant governor of Utah was created in 1975. Nine people have held the position since then.

Prior to the creation of the lieutenant governor's office, the succession to the governorship of Utah was held by the Utah Secretary of State. The office of the secretary of state was abolished by the state legislature in 1976; its duties were given to the newly created office of the lieutenant governor. The lieutenant governor is elected on the same ticket as the governor.

The incumbent lieutenant governor is Republican Deidre Henderson, who has served since 2021.

== Duties ==
Utah has no secretary of state, and many of the functions that would commonly be performed by a secretary of state are instead fulfilled by the lieutenant governor. The lieutenant governor's statutory duties include oversight of all notaries public, the legal authentication or apostillation of official documents for use in foreign jurisdictions, registering and regulating licensed lobbyists, certifying municipal annexations, and serving as the "keeper" of the Great Seal of the State of Utah. Notably, she has general administrative authority over all elections—federal, state, or local—that take place in Utah.

== List of lieutenant governors ==
Parties

Democratic Republican

#	Portrait	Lieutenant Governor	Took office	Left office	Governor(s) served under	Party
1		Clyde L. Miller (1910–1988)	1975	1977	Cal Rampton (D)	Democratic
2		David Smith Monson (born 1945)	1977	1985	Scott M. Matheson (D)	Republican
3		W. Val Oveson (born 1952)	1985	1993	Norman H. Bangerter (R)	Republican
4		Olene Walker (1930–2015)	1993	2003	Mike Leavitt (R)	Republican
5		Gayle McKeachnie (born 1943)	2003	2005	Olene Walker (R)	Republican
6		Gary Herbert (born 1947)	2005	2009	Jon Huntsman Jr. (R)	Republican
7		Greg Bell (born 1948)	2009	2013	Gary Herbert (R)	Republican
8		Spencer Cox (born 1975)	2013	2021	Gary Herbert (R)	Republican
9		Deidre Henderson (born 1974)	2021	Incumbent	Spencer Cox (R)	Republican

== See also ==
- Constitution of Utah
