= Utah Attorney General =

Attorney general for the U.S. state of Utah

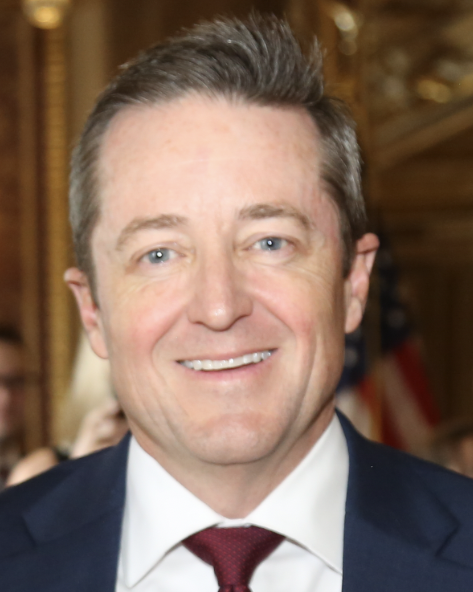
- Incumbent; Derek Brown since January 6, 2025
- Term length: Four years
- First holder: Daniel H. Wells
- Website: https://attorneygeneral.utah.gov

The attorney general of Utah is an elected constitutional officer in the executive branch of the state government of Utah. The attorney general is the chief legal officer and legal adviser in the state. The office is elected, with a term of four years. The current office holder is Derek Brown, who was inaugurated on January 8, 2025.

== List of attorneys general ==
=== Deseret (1849) ===
- Daniel H. Wells (1849)

=== Utah Territory (1850–1874) ===
- Hosea Stout (1850–?)
- James Ferguson
- Albert Carrington (1856–?)
- Zerubbabel Snow (1869–1874)

=== State of Utah (1896–present) ===
#	Image	Name	Term	Party
1		A. C. Bishop	1896–1901	Republican
2		M. A. Breeden	1901–1909	Republican
3		A. R. Barnes	1909–1917	Republican
4		Dan B. Shields	1917–1921	Democratic
5		Harvey H. Cluff	1921–1929	Republican
6		George P. Parker	1929–1933	Republican
7		Joseph Chez	1933–1941	Democratic
8		Grover A. Giles	1941–1949	Democratic
9		Clinton D. Vernon	1949–1953	Democratic
10		E. R. Callister	1953–1959	Republican
11		Walter L. Budge	1959–1961	Republican
12		A. Pratt Kessler	1961–1965	Republican
13		Phil L. Hansen	1965–1969	Democratic
14		Vernon B. Romney	1969–1977	Republican
15		Robert B. Hansen	1977–1981	Republican
16		David L. Wilkinson	1981–1989	Republican
17		Paul Van Dam	1989–1993	Democratic
18		Jan Graham	1993–2001	Democratic
19		Mark Shurtleff	2001–2013	Republican
20		John Swallow	2013	Republican
21		Sean Reyes	2013–2025	Republican
22		Derek Brown	2025–present	Republican
