= 2014 Utah Attorney General special election =

- November 4, 2014
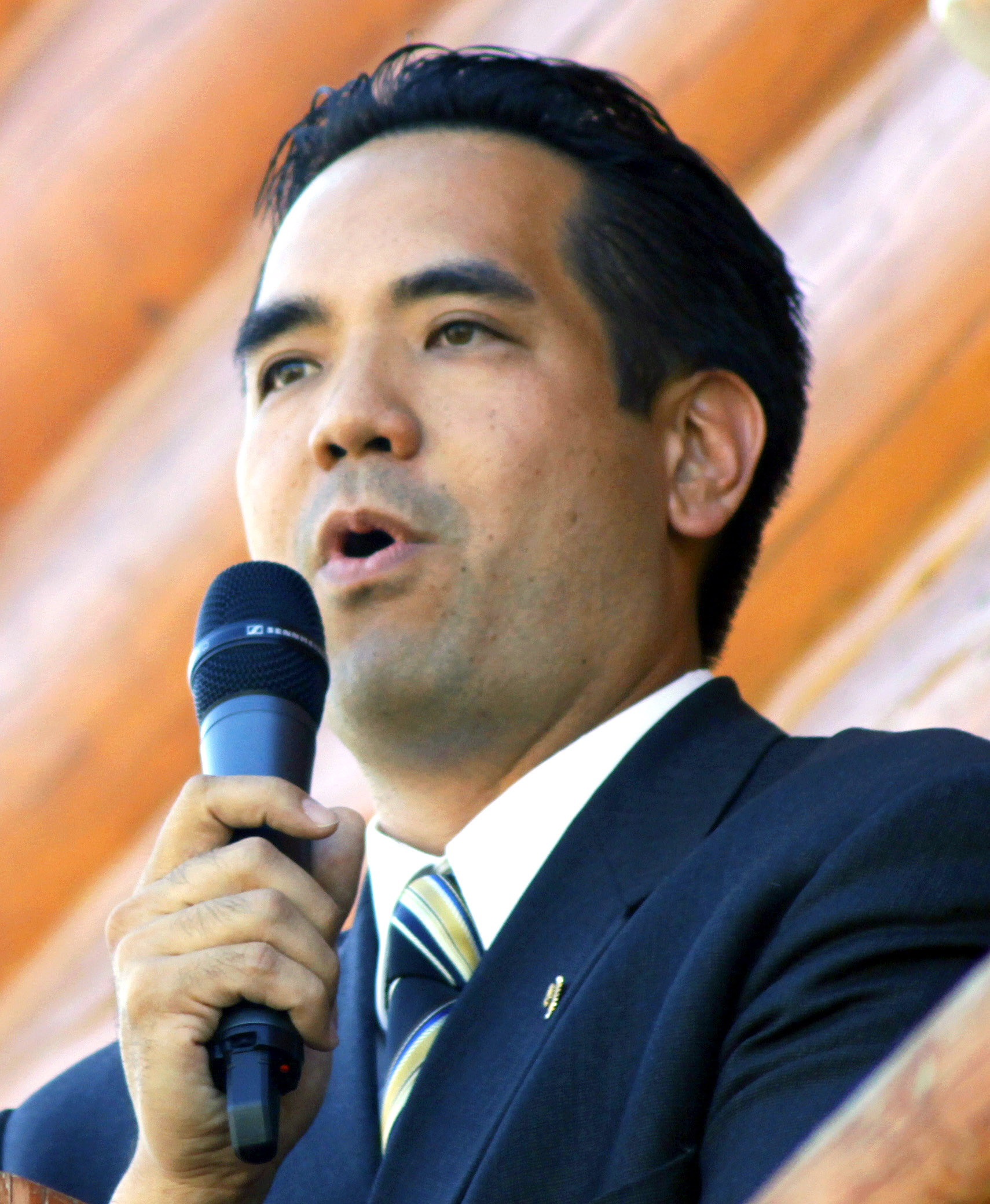
		DEM
Nominee	Sean Reyes	Charles Stormont
Party	Republican	Democratic
Popular vote	355,275	151,967
Percentage	63.06%	26.97%
- County results Reyes: 50–60% 60–70% 70–80% 80–90% Stormont: 40–50%
Attorney General before election
Sean Reyes
Republican
Elected Attorney General
Sean Reyes
Republican

The 2014 Utah Attorney General special election was held on November 4, 2014. Attorney General John Swallow resigned after investigations into improprieties, and Governor Gary Herbert appointed Sean Reyes to replace him. Reyes defeated Democratic nominee Charles Stormont in a landslide. Stormont was the first Democratic candidate since 2004 to win multiple counties, carrying Summit and Grand counties.

== Appointment ==
Pursuant to Utah law, Governor Gary Herbert was required to pick a replacement from three names chosen by the Utah Republican Party Central Committee. Nine Republican candidates put their names forward for consideration. They were:

- Scott Burns, former Iron County attorney, former deputy director for State and Local Affairs at the ONDCP and nominee for attorney general in 1992 and 1996
- Michelle Mumford, an attorney, assistant dean of admissions at the Brigham Young University law school and secretary of the Utah Republican Party
- Bret Rawson, a reserve Bountiful policeman and attorney
- Sean Reyes, an attorney who lost to Swallow in the primary in 2012
- Stephen Sorenson, a retired prosecutor and former head of the litigation division of the Attorney General's office
- Robert Smith, an attorney and managing director of Brigham Young University's International Center for Law and Religion Studies
- Brian Tarbet, a retired Adjutant General of the Utah National Guard and the Acting Attorney General
- Brent Ward, former United States Attorney for the District of Utah and a candidate for the U.S. Senate in 1992
- Michael J. Wilkins, a former justice of the Utah Supreme Court and former chairman of the Utah Independent Ethics Commission.

Burns, Sorensen, Tarbet and Wilkins all said they would not run in the special election if chosen.

Sorenson withdrew from contention on December 9, 2013, with Ward also withdrawing two days later. A debate was held on December 11 and Reyes, Smith and Tarbet were chosen as the finalists by the Central Committee on December 14. Herbert chose Reyes on December 23, who was sworn in on December 30, 2013.

== General election ==
=== Candidates ===
- Sean Reyes, appointed incumbent Attorney General (Republican)
- Charles Stormont, rancher and attorney (Democratic)
- W. Andrew McCullough, perennial candidate, Libertarian nominee for this office in 1996, 2000, 2004, 2008 and 2012 (Libertarian)
- Gregory Hansen (Constitution)
- Leslie Curtis (Independent American)

=== Results ===
2014 Utah Attorney General special election
Party	Candidate	Votes	%	±%
Republican	Sean Reyes	355,275	63.06%	▼1.64
Democratic	Charles Stormont	151,967	26.97%	▼2.96
Libertarian	W. Andrew McCullough	22,333	3.96%	▼1.41
Constitution	Gregory Hansen	18,722	3.32%	New
Independent American	Leslie Curtis	15,108	2.68%	New
Total votes		563,403	100.00%	N/A
Republican hold				
