= 2012 Utah Attorney General election =

- November 6, 2012
	GOP	DEM	LIB
Nominee	John Swallow	Dee W. Smith	W. Andrew McCullough
Party	Republican	Democratic	Libertarian
Popular vote	638,492	295,317	53,018
Percentage	64.70%	29.93%	5.37%
- Swallow: 40–50% 50–60% 60–70% 70–80% 80–90% Smith: 40–50%
Attorney General before election
Mark Shurtleff
Republican
Elected Attorney General
John Swallow
Republican

The 2012 Utah Attorney General election was held on November 6, 2012. Mark Shurtleff, the incumbent Attorney General of Utah since 2001, elected to retire. Republican John Swallow won the election, defeating Weber County Attorney Dee W. Smith in a landslide and underperformed Republican nominee Mitt Romney in the concurrent presidential election by 13%. In December 2013, Swallow resigned after investigations into improprieties.

== General election ==
=== Candidates ===
- John Swallow, Chief Deputy Attorney General for Utah and former state senator (Republican)
- Dee W. Smith, Weber County Attorney (Democratic)
- W. Andrew McCullough, perennial candidate, Libertarian nominee for this office in 1996, 2000, 2004 and 2008 (Libertarian)

=== Results ===
2012 Utah Attorney General election
Party	Candidate	Votes	%	±%
Republican	John Swallow	638,492	64.70%	▼4.62
Democratic	Dee W. Smith	295,317	29.93%	▲3.33
Libertarian	W. Andrew McCullough	53,018	5.37%	▲1.29
Total votes		986,827	100.00%	N/A
Republican hold				

==== By congressional district ====
Swallow won all four congressional districts, including one that elected a Democrat.

District	Swallow	Smith	McCullough	Representative
1st	66%	29%	5%	Rob Bishop
2nd	61%	33%	5%	Chris Stewart
3rd	71%	24%	5%	Jason Chaffetz
4th	60%	34%	6%	Jim Matheson

== See also ==
- 2012 Utah gubernatorial election
