= 2016 United States attorney general elections =

- November 8, 2016

10 attorney general offices 10 states (Note: Seat tallies and popular vote do not include states that do not elect attorneys general or territorial attorneys general.)
	Majority party	Minority party
Party	Republican	Democratic
Seats before	23	20
Seats after	24	19
Seat change	▲1	▼1
Popular vote	10,444,739	11,149,338
Percentage	45.82%	48.92%
Seats up	4	6
Seats won	5	5
- Democratic hold Republican hold Republican gain No election

The 2016 United States attorney general elections were held on November 8, 2016, in 10 states. The previous attorney general elections for eight of the 10 states took place in 2012. The last attorney general elections for Utah and Vermont took place in 2014, as Utah held a special election due to the resignation of John Swallow, while the attorney general of Vermont serves two-year terms. The elections took place concurrently with the 2016 presidential election, elections to the House of Representatives and Senate, and numerous state and local elections.

Six state attorneys general ran for reelection and four did not. Missouri was only state that changed partisan control, where Republican Josh Hawley won the open seat, replacing outgoing Democrat Chris Koster. The four other open seats were won by the party which previously held the office, and all five incumbents who ran won re-election. Republicans expanded their majority control of popularly elected state attorneys general.

== Election predictions ==
Several sites and individuals published predictions of competitive seats. These predictions looked at factors such as the strength of the incumbent (if the incumbent is running for re-election), the strength of the candidates, and the partisan leanings of the state. The predictions assigned ratings to each seat, with the rating indicating the predicted advantage that a party has in winning that seat.

Most election predictors use:

- "tossup": no advantage
- "tilt" (used by some predictors): advantage that is not quite as strong as "lean"
- "lean": slight advantage
- "likely": significant, but surmountable, advantage
- "safe": near-certain chance of victory

State	Incumbent	Governing March 14, 2016	Result
Indiana	Greg Zoeller	Lean R	Curtis Hill
Missouri	Chris Koster	Tossup	Josh Hawley
Montana	Tim Fox	Safe R	Tim Fox
North Carolina	Roy Cooper	Tossup	Josh Stein
Oregon	Ellen Rosenblum	Solid D	Ellen Rosenblum
Pennsylvania	Bruce Beemer	Tossup	Josh Shapiro
Utah	Sean Reyes	Solid R	Sean Reyes
Vermont	William Sorrell	Likely D	T. J. Donovan
Washington	Bob Ferguson	Solid D	Bob Ferguson
West Virginia	Patrick Morrisey	Likely R	Patrick Morrisey

== Results summary ==
State	Attorney General	Party	First elected	Result	Candidates
Indiana	Greg Zoeller	Republican	2008	Incumbent retired to run for U.S. Representative. New attorney general elected. Republican hold.	✓ Curtis Hill (Republican) 62.3%; Lorenzo Arredondo (Democratic) 37.7%
Missouri	Chris Koster	Democratic	2008	Incumbent retired to run for Governor of Missouri. New attorney general elected. Republican gain.	✓ Josh Hawley (Republican) 58.5%; Teresa Hensley (Democratic) 41.5%
Montana	Tim Fox	Republican	2012	Incumbent re-elected.	✓ Tim Fox (Republican) 67.8%; Larry Jent (Democratic) 32.3%
North Carolina	Roy Cooper	Democratic	2000	Incumbent retired to run for Governor of North Carolina. New attorney general elected. Democratic hold.	✓ Josh Stein (Democratic) 50.3%; Buck Newton (Republican) 49.7%
Oregon	Ellen Rosenblum	Democratic	2012 (Note: Rosenblum took office after her predecessor (John Kroger) resigned. She was subsequently elected in the 2012 Oregon Attorney General election.)	Incumbent re-elected.	✓ Ellen Rosenblum (Democratic) 55.2%; Daniel Crowe (Republican) 41.4%; Lars Hedbor (Libertarian) 3.2%
Pennsylvania	Bruce Beemer	Democratic	2016 (Note: Beemer took office after his predecessor (Kathleen Kane) resigned.)	Incumbent retired. New attorney general elected. Democratic hold.	✓ Josh Shapiro (Democratic) 51.4%; John Rafferty Jr. (Republican) 48.6%
Utah	Sean Reyes	Republican	2013 (Note: Reyes took office after his predecessor (John Swallow) resigned. He was subsequently elected in the 2014 Utah Attorney General special election.)	Incumbent re-elected.	✓ Sean Reyes (Republican) 65.4%; Jon Harper (Democratic) 25.1%; Andrew McCullough (Libertarian) 6.7%; Michael Isbell (Ind. American) 2.8%
Vermont	William Sorrell	Democratic	1997 (Note: Sorrell took office after his predecessor (Jeffrey Amestoy) resigned. He was subsequently elected in 1998.)	Incumbent retired. New attorney general elected. Democratic hold.	✓ T. J. Donovan (Democratic) 66.6%; Deborah Bucknam (Republican) 29.4%; Rosemarie Jackowski (Liberty Union) 4.0%
Washington	Bob Ferguson	Democratic	2012	Incumbent re-elected.	✓ Bob Ferguson (Democratic) 66.9%; Joshua Trumbull (Libertarian) 32.8%
West Virginia	Patrick Morrisey	Republican	2012	Incumbent re-elected.	✓ Patrick Morrisey (Republican) 51.6%; Doug Reynolds (Democratic) 42.0%; Karl Kolenich (Libertarian) 3.5%; Michael Sharley (Mountain) 3.0%

== Closest races ==
States where the margin of victory was under 1%:

1. North Carolina, 0.4% (20,232 votes)

States where the margin of victory was under 5%:

1. Pennsylvania, 2.8% (165,685 votes)

States where the margin of victory was under 10%:

1. West Virginia, 9.7% (67,192 votes)

== Indiana ==
2016 Indiana Attorney General election
- November 8, 2016
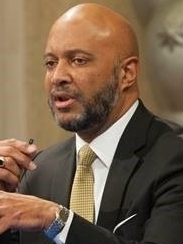

Nominee	Curtis Hill	Lorenzo Arredondo
Party	Republican	Democratic
Popular vote	1,643,689	994,085
Percentage	62.3%	37.7%
- County results Hill: 50–60% 60–70% 70–80% 80–90% Arredondo: 50–60% 60–70%
Attorney General before election
Greg Zoeller
Republican
Elected Attorney General
Curtis Hill
Republican

Incumbent Republican Attorney General Greg Zoeller declined to run for a third term in order to run for the U.S. House of Representatives. Republicans chose Elkhart County Prosecutor Curtis Hill over former Attorney General Steve Carter, state senator Randall Head, and Deputy Attorney General Abby Kuzma at the Republican state convention on June 11. Democrats nominated Lorenzo Arredondo, former Lake County Circuit Judge. Hill won the election.

Indiana general election
Party	Candidate	Votes	%
Republican	Curtis Hill	1,643,689	62.31
Democratic	Lorenzo Arredondo	994,085	37.69
Total votes		2,637,774	100.00
Republican hold			

== Missouri ==
2016 Missouri Attorney General election
- November 8, 2016
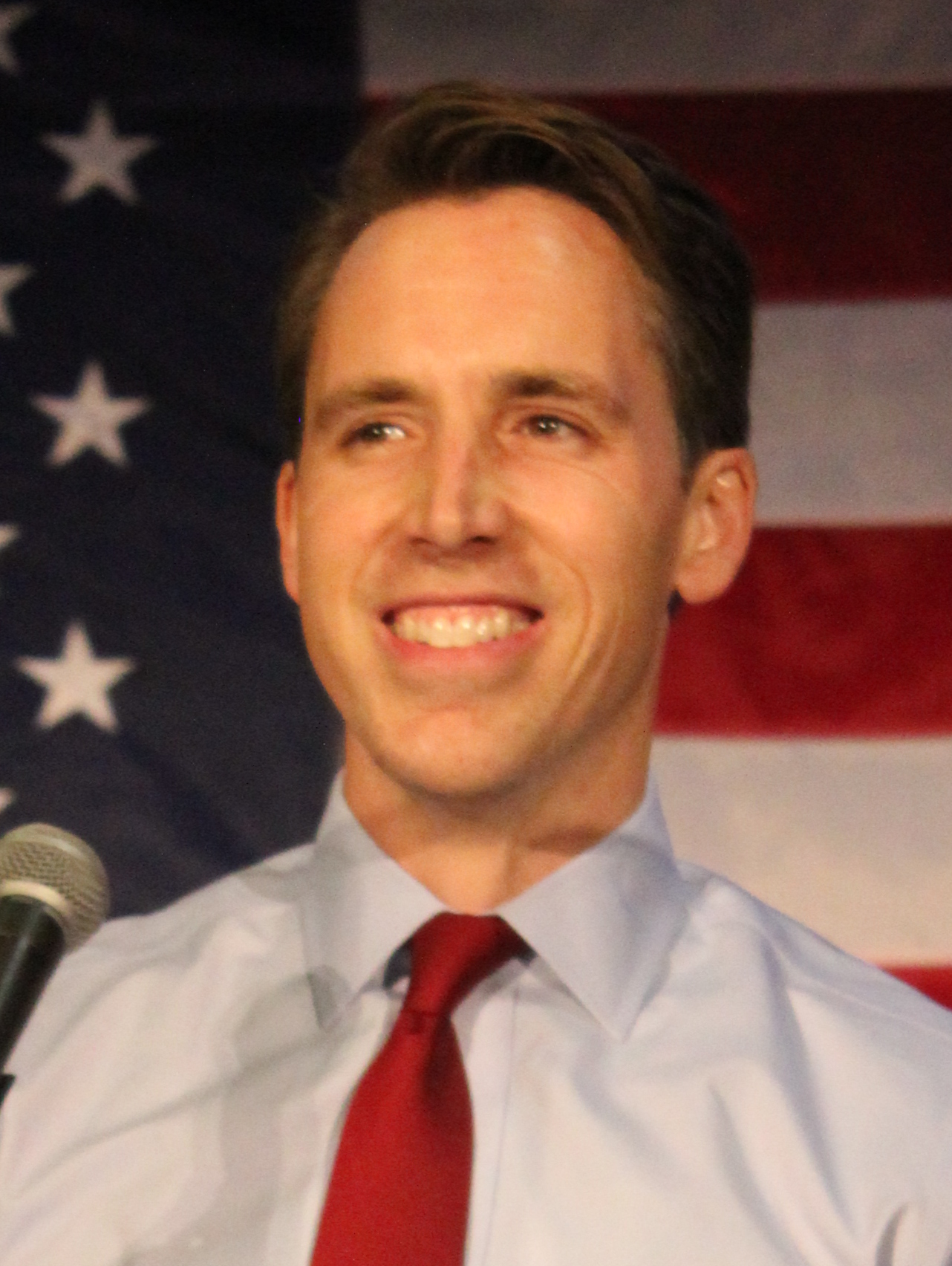

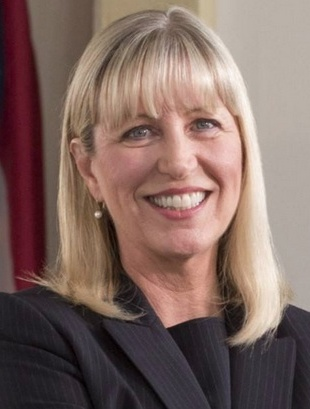
Nominee	Josh Hawley	Teresa Hensley
Party	Republican	Democratic
Popular vote	1,607,550	1,140,252
Percentage	58.5%	41.5%
- County results Hawley: 50–60% 60–70% 70–80% 80–90% Hensley: 50–60% 70–80%
Attorney General before election
Chris Koster
Democratic
Elected Attorney General
Josh Hawley
Republican

Incumbent Democratic Attorney General Chris Koster chose not to run for re-election to a third term, but instead ran for Governor of Missouri.

Former Cass County prosecuting attorney Tereasa Hensley was nominated in the Democratic primary over St. Louis County assessor Jake Zimmerman. State senator Scott Sifton also announced his candidacy, but withdrew before the primary in order to run for re-election. The Republican nominee was MU law professor Josh Hawley, who was nominated over state senator Kurt Schaefer.

Although early polling showed a tighter race, Hawley won the election by a wide margin, becoming the first Republican attorney general since William L. Webster left office in 1993.

Missouri Democratic primary
Party	Candidate	Votes	%
Democratic	Teresa Hensley	167,626	52.72
Democratic	Jake Zimmerman	150,322	47.28
Total votes		317,948	100.00

Missouri Republican primary
Party	Candidate	Votes	%
Republican	Josh Hawley	415,702	64.22
Republican	Kurt Schaefer	231,657	35.79
Total votes		647,359	100.00

Missouri general election
Party	Candidate	Votes	%
Republican	Josh Hawley	1,607,550	58.50
Democratic	Teresa Hensley	1,140,252	41.50
Total votes		2,747,802	100.00
Republican gain from Democratic			

== Montana ==
2016 Montana Attorney General election
- November 8, 2016
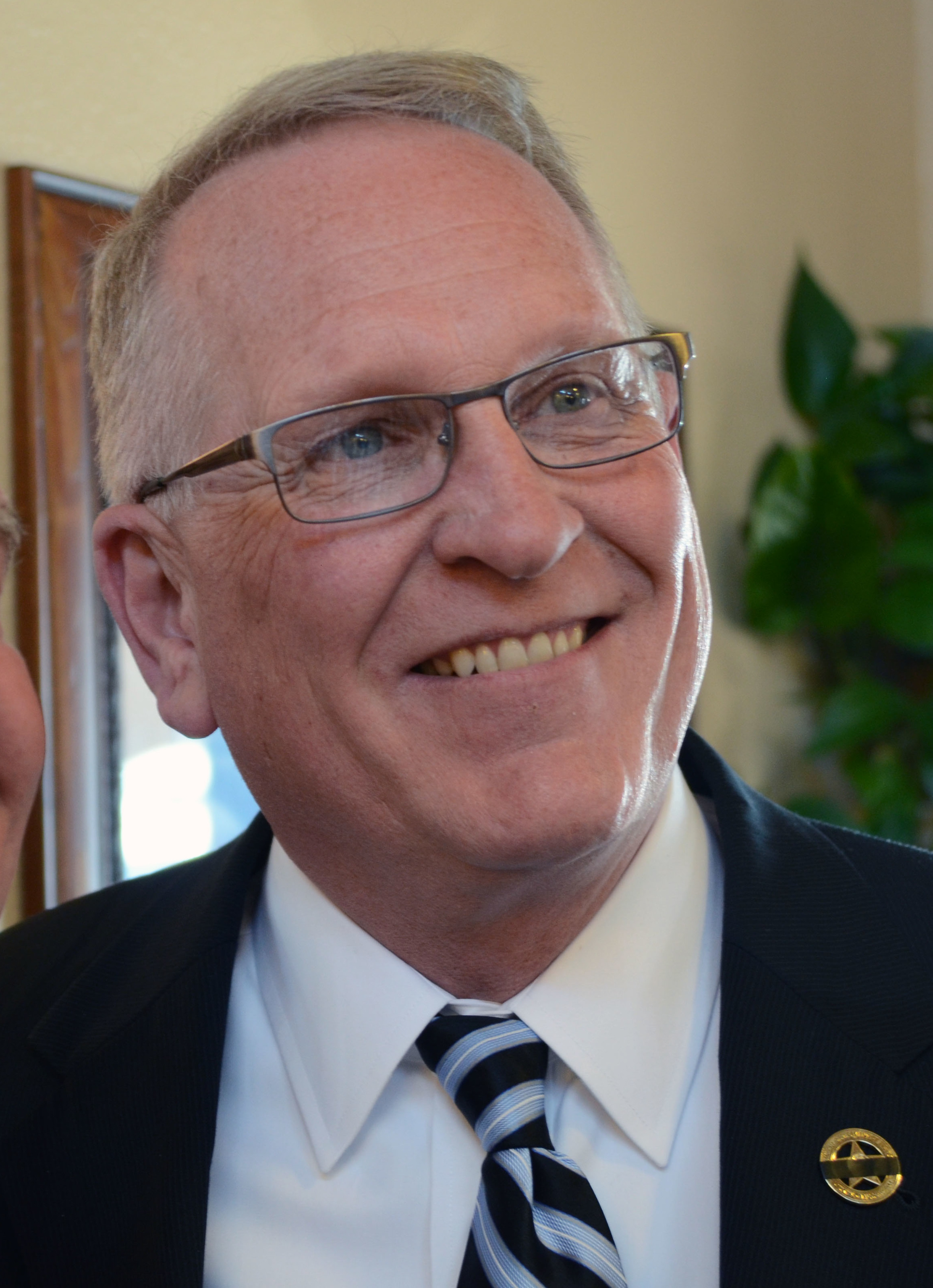

Nominee	Tim Fox	Larry Jent
Party	Republican	Democratic
Popular vote	332,766	158,970
Percentage	67.7%	32.3%
- County results Fox: 50–60% 60–70% 70–80% 80–90% >90% Jent: 50–60% 60–70%
Attorney General before election
Tim Fox
Republican
Elected Attorney General
Tim Fox
Republican

Incumbent Republican Tim Fox ran for re-election to a second term and was unopposed in the Republican primary. The Democratic nominee was state senator Larry Jent, who also ran for the nomination unopposed. Fox easily won re-election.

Montana Republican primary
Party	Candidate	Votes	%
Republican	Tim Fox (incumbent)	140,173	100.00
Total votes		140,173	100.00

Montana Democratic primary
Party	Candidate	Votes	%
Democratic	Larry Jent	102,171	100.00
Total votes		102,171	100.00

Montana general election
Party	Candidate	Votes	%
Republican	Tim Fox (incumbent)	332,766	67.67
Democratic	Larry Jent	158,970	32.33
Total votes		491,736	100.00
Republican hold			

== North Carolina ==
2016 North Carolina Attorney General election
- November 8, 2016
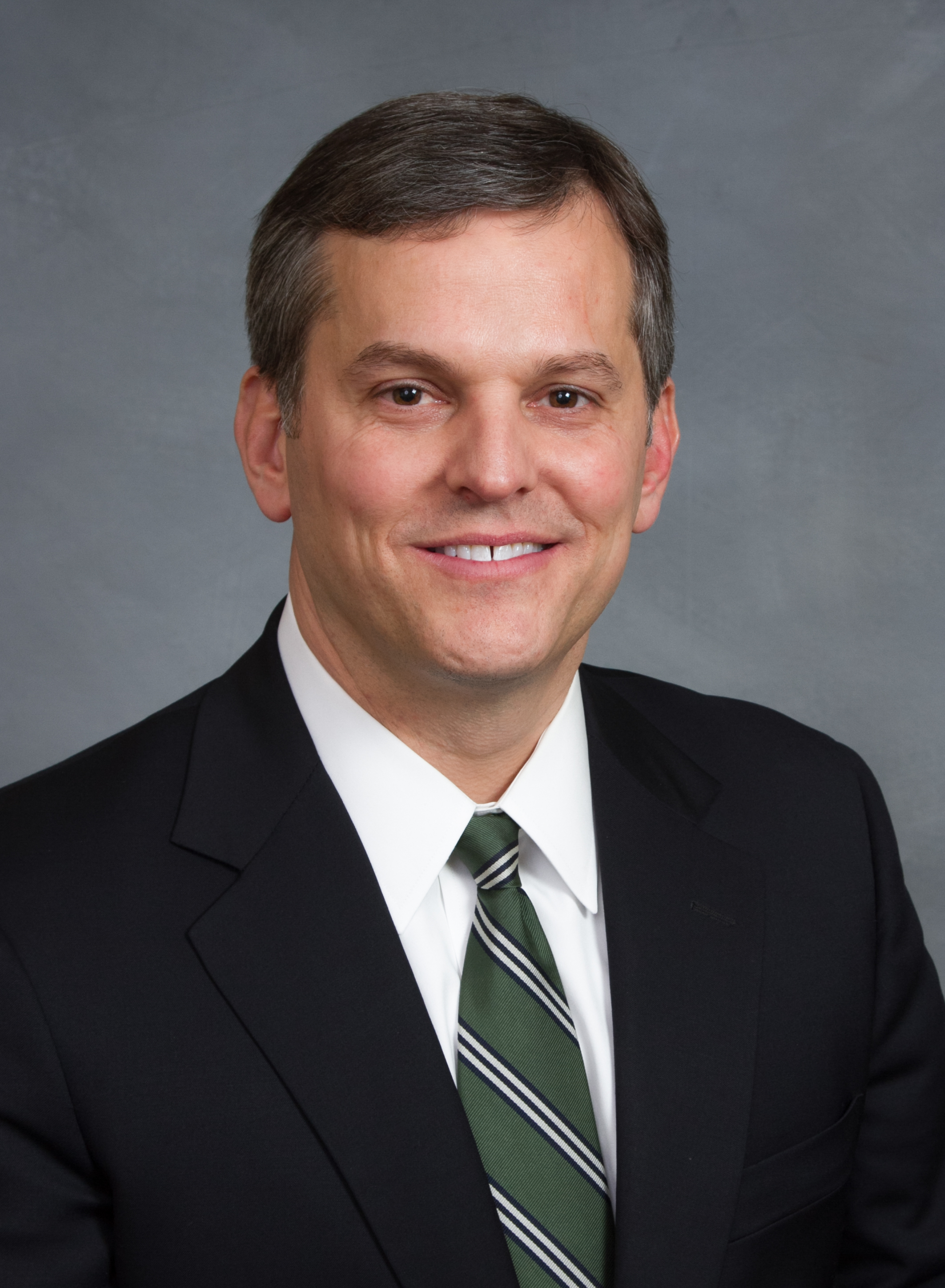

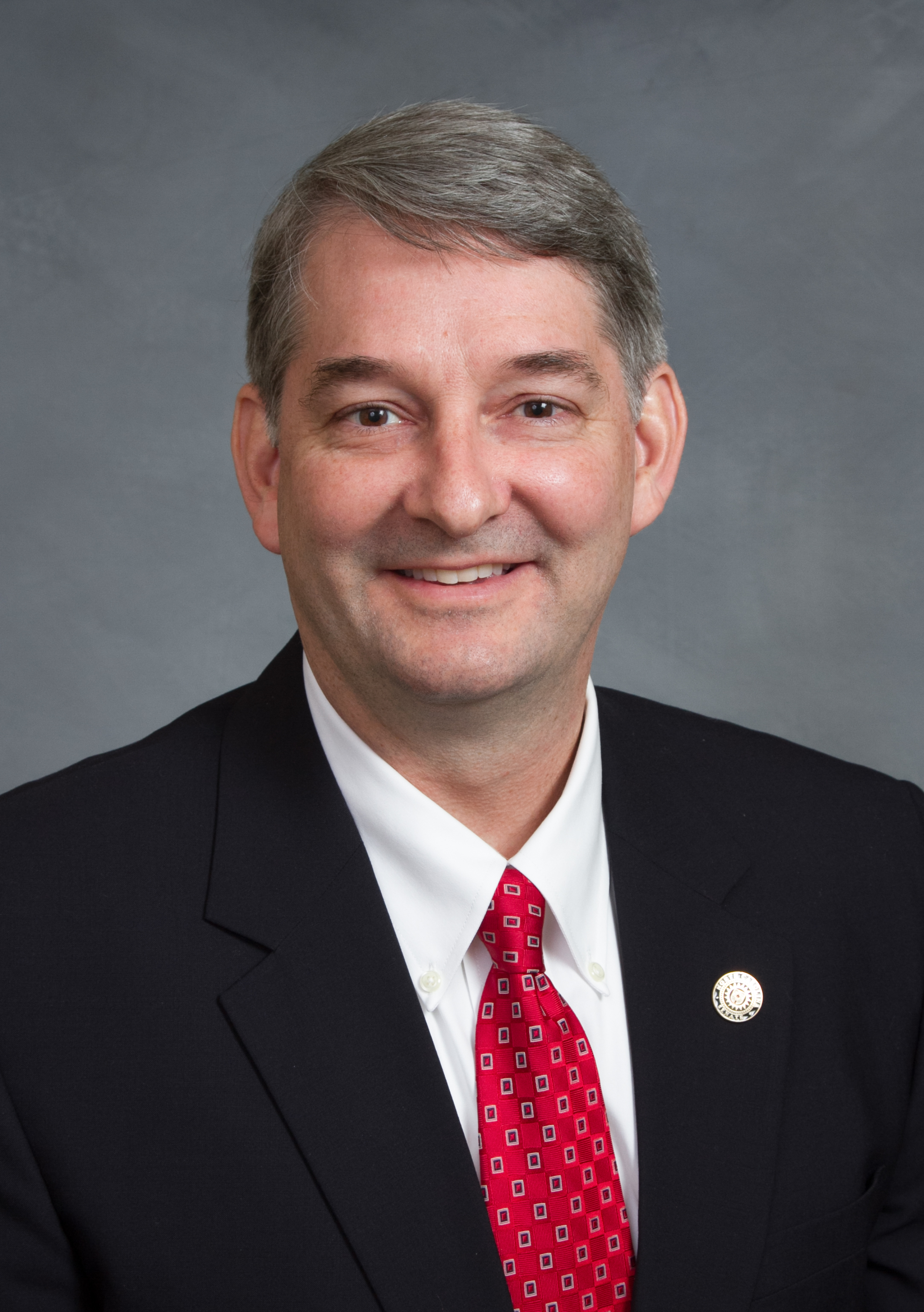
Nominee	Josh Stein	Buck Newton
Party	Democratic	Republican
Popular vote	2,303,619	2,279,006
Percentage	50.3%	49.7%
- County results Stein: 50–60% 60–70% 70–80% Newton: 50–60% 60–70% 70–80%
Attorney General before election
Roy Cooper
Democratic
Elected Attorney General
Josh Stein
Democratic

Incumbent Democratic Attorney General Roy Cooper chose not to run for re-election to a fifth term in office, but instead successfully ran for Governor.

Primary elections were held on March 15. Democratic former state senator Josh Stein defeated Republican state senator Buck Newton in the general election.

North Carolina Democratic primary
Party	Candidate	Votes	%
Democratic	Josh Stein	510,003	53.37
Democratic	Marcus Williams	445,524	46.63
Total votes		955,527	100.00

North Carolina Republican primary
Party	Candidate	Votes	%
Republican	Buck Newton	503,880	54.89
Republican	Jim O'Neill	414,073	45.11
Total votes		917,953	100.00

North Carolina general election
Party	Candidate	Votes	%
Democratic	Josh Stein	2,303,619	50.27
Republican	Buck Newton	2,279,006	49.73
Total votes		4,582,625	100.00
Democratic hold			

== Oregon ==
2016 Oregon Attorney General election
- November 8, 2016
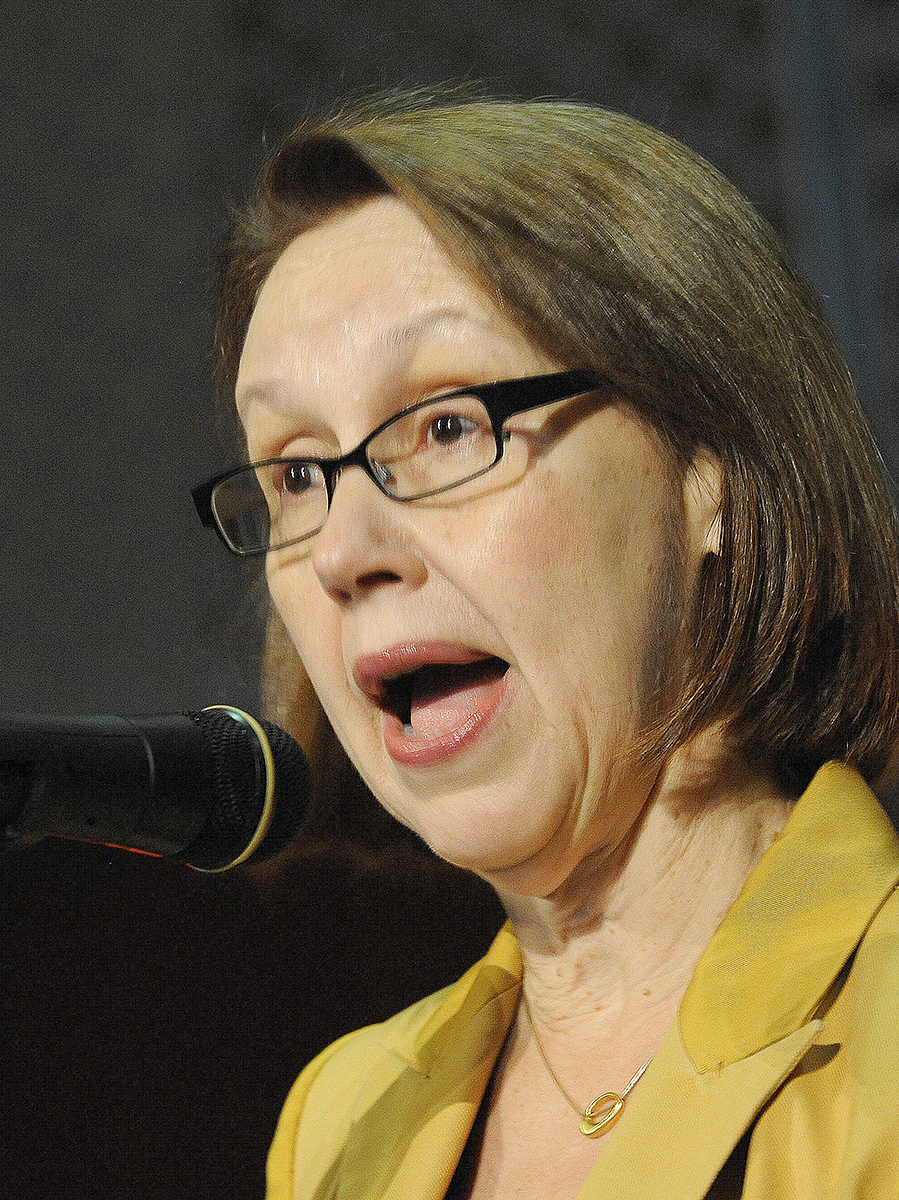

Nominee	Ellen Rosenblum	Daniel Crowe
Party	Democratic	Republican
Popular vote	1,035,361	776,664
Percentage	55.2%	41.4%
- County results Rosenblum: 40–50% 50–60% 60–70% 70–80% Crowe: 40–50% 50–60% 60–70% 70–80%
Attorney General before election
Ellen Rosenblum
Democratic
Elected Attorney General
Ellen Rosenblum
Democratic

Incumbent Democratic Attorney General Ellen Rosenblum ran for re-election to a second full term. She won the election over Republican nominee Daniel Zene Crowe.

Oregon general election
Party	Candidate	Votes	%
Democratic	Ellen Rosenblum (incumbent)	1,011,761	54.97
Republican	Daniel Zene Crowe	766,753	41.66
Libertarian	Lars Hedbor	58,609	3.18
Write-in		3,507	0.19
Total votes		1,840,630	100.00
Democratic hold			

== Pennsylvania ==
2016 Pennsylvania Attorney General election
- November 8, 2016
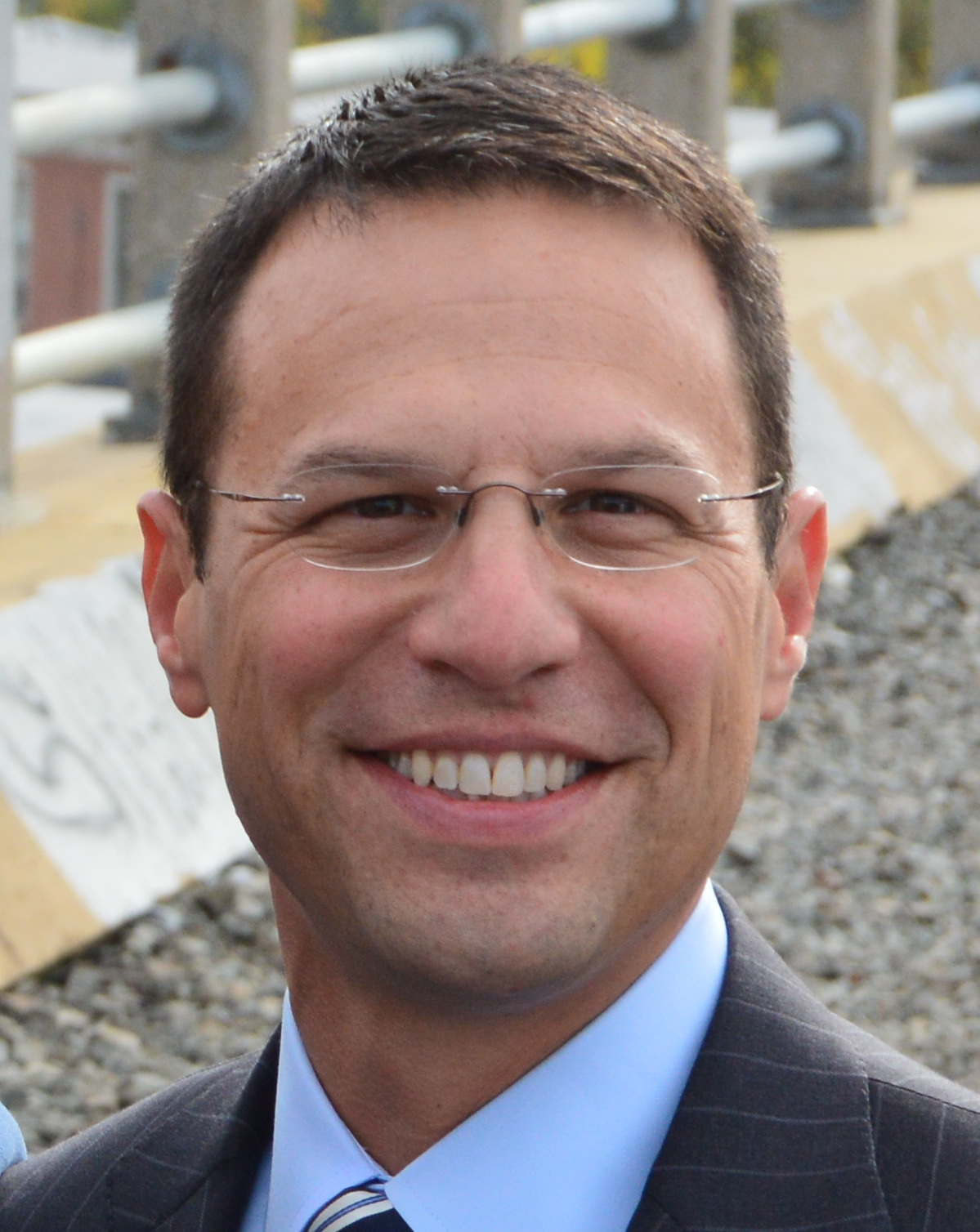

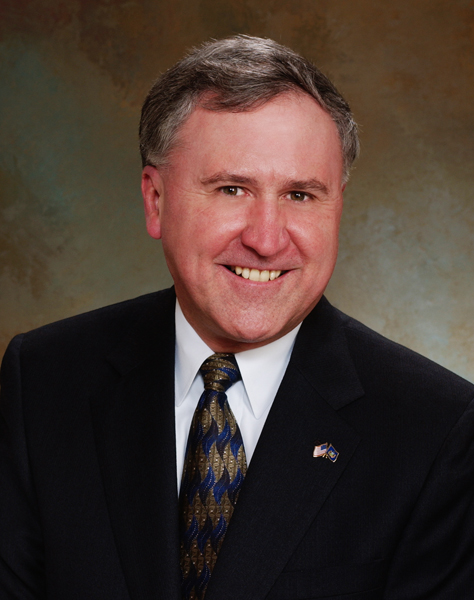
Nominee	Josh Shapiro	John Rafferty Jr.
Party	Democratic	Republican
Popular vote	3,057,010	2,891,325
Percentage	51.4%	48.6%
- County results Shapiro: 50–60% 60–70% 80–90% Rafferty: 50–60% 60–70% 70–80% 80–90%
Attorney General before election
Bruce Beemer
Democratic
Elected Attorney General
Josh Shapiro
Democratic

Incumbent Democratic Attorney General Kathleen Kane originally indicated her intention to seek re-election, but dropped out after she was criminally charged with violating grand jury secrecy laws stemming from alleged leaks of grand jury investigation details to embarrass a political enemy. Inspector General Bruce Beemer was appointed to fill out the remainder of her term, although he did not seek election to a full term.

Democratic candidates included Northampton County District Attorney John Morganelli, Montgomery County Board of Supervisors chair Josh Shapiro, and Allegheny County District Attorney Stephen Zappala. The Republican primary was between two candidates: state senator John Rafferty Jr. and former prosecutor Joe Peters. Shapiro and Rafferty won their respective primaries.

Governing rated this election as a tossup. Shapiro narrowly defeated Rafferty in the general election.

Pennsylvania Democratic primary
Party	Candidate	Votes	%
Democratic	Josh Shapiro	725,168	47.03
Democratic	Stephen Zappala	566,501	36.74
Democratic	John Morganelli	250,097	16.22
Total votes		1,541,766	100.00

Pennsylvania Republican primary
Party	Candidate	Votes	%
Republican	John Rafferty Jr.	819,510	63.82
Republican	Joe Peters	464,491	36.18
Total votes		1,284,001	100.00

Pennsylvania general election
Party	Candidate	Votes	%
Democratic	Josh Shapiro	3,057,010	51.39
Republican	John Rafferty Jr.	2,891,325	48.61
Total votes		5,948,335	100.00
Democratic hold			

== Utah ==
2016 Utah Attorney General election
- November 8, 2016
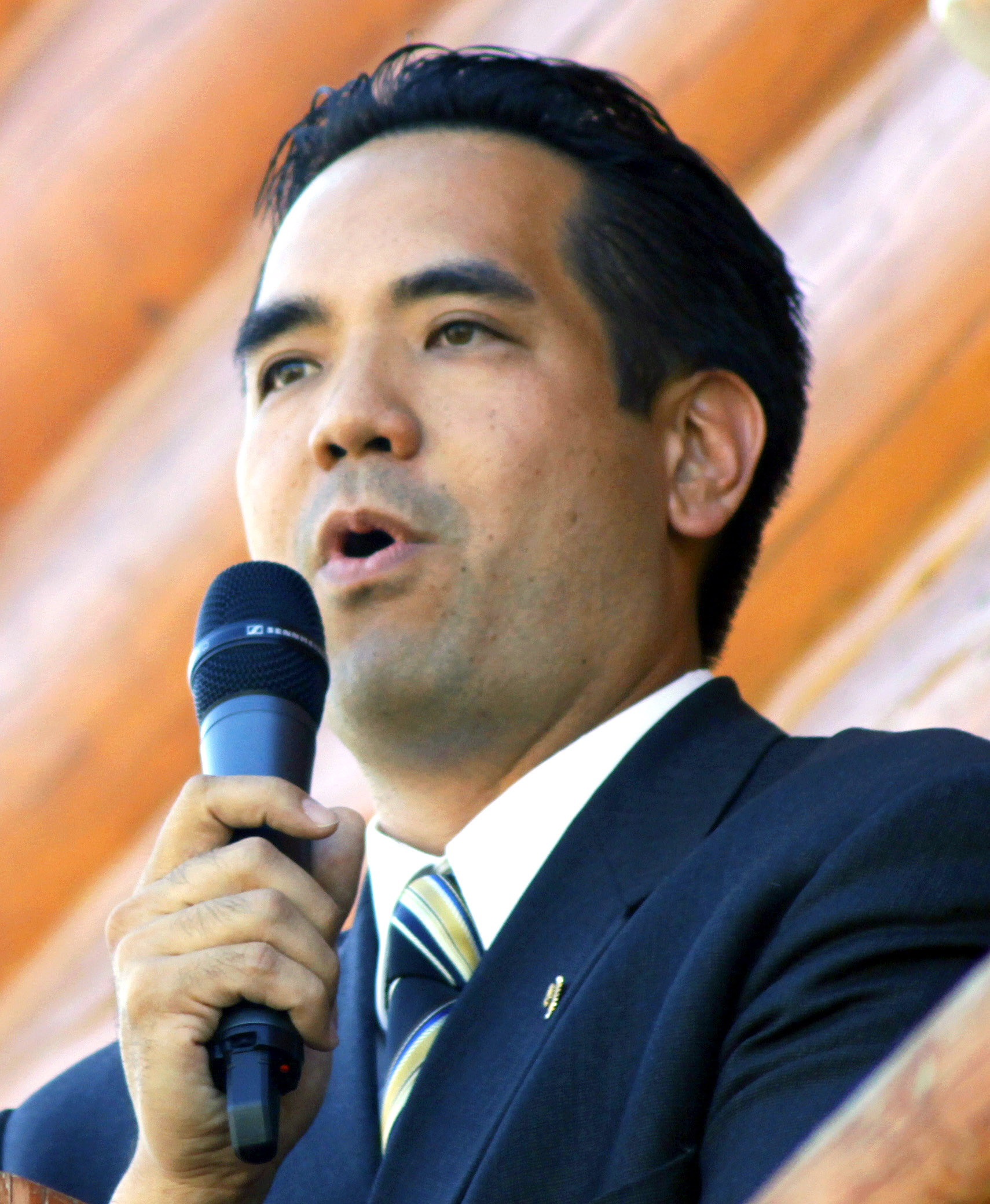

Nominee	Sean Reyes	Jon Harper	Andrew McCullough
Party	Republican	Democratic	Libertarian
Popular vote	719,064	275,571	73,975
Percentage	65.4%	25.1%	6.7%
- County results Reyes: 40–50% 50–60% 60–70% 70–80% 80–90% Harper: 40–50%
Attorney General before election
Sean Reyes
Republican
Elected Attorney General
Sean Reyes
Republican

Incumbent Republican Attorney General Sean Reyes ran for re-election to a full term after serving the remainder of John Swallow's term. He easily won the general election, defeating Democratic nominee Jon Harper and Libertarian nominee Andrew McCullogh.

Utah general election
Party	Candidate	Votes	%
Republican	Sean Reyes (incumbent)	719,064	65.41
Democratic	Jon Harper	275,571	25.07
Libertarian	Andrew McCullough	73,975	6.73
Independent American	Michael Isbell	30,687	2.79
Total votes		1,099,297	100.00
Republican hold			

== Vermont ==
2016 Vermont Attorney General election
- November 8, 2016

Nominee	T. J. Donovan	Deborah Bucknam
Party	Democratic	Republican
Popular vote	200,020	88,431
Percentage	66.6%	29.4%
- County results Donovan: 50–60% 60–70% 70–80% Buckman: 40–50%
Attorney General before election
William Sorrell
Democratic
Elected Attorney General
T. J. Donovan
Democratic

Incumbent Democratic Attorney General William Sorrell, the state's longest-serving Attorney General (since 1997), did not run for re-election. Democratic nominee T.J. Donovan won the general election.

Vermont Democratic primary
Party	Candidate	Votes	%
Democratic	T. J. Donovan	49,017	80.16
Democratic	H. Brooke Paige	11,917	19.49
Write-in		214	0.35
Total votes		61,148	100.00

Vermont Republican primary
Party	Candidate	Votes	%
Republican	Deborah Bucknam	31,173	95.48
Write-in		1,477	4.52
Total votes		32,650	100.00

Vermont general election
Party	Candidate	Votes	%
Democratic	T. J. Donovan	200,020	66.56
Republican	Deborah Bucknam	88,431	29.43
Liberty Union	Rosemarie Jackowski	11,844	3.94
Write-in		202	0.07
Total votes		300,497	100.00
Democratic hold			

== Washington ==
2016 Washington Attorney General election
- November 8, 2016
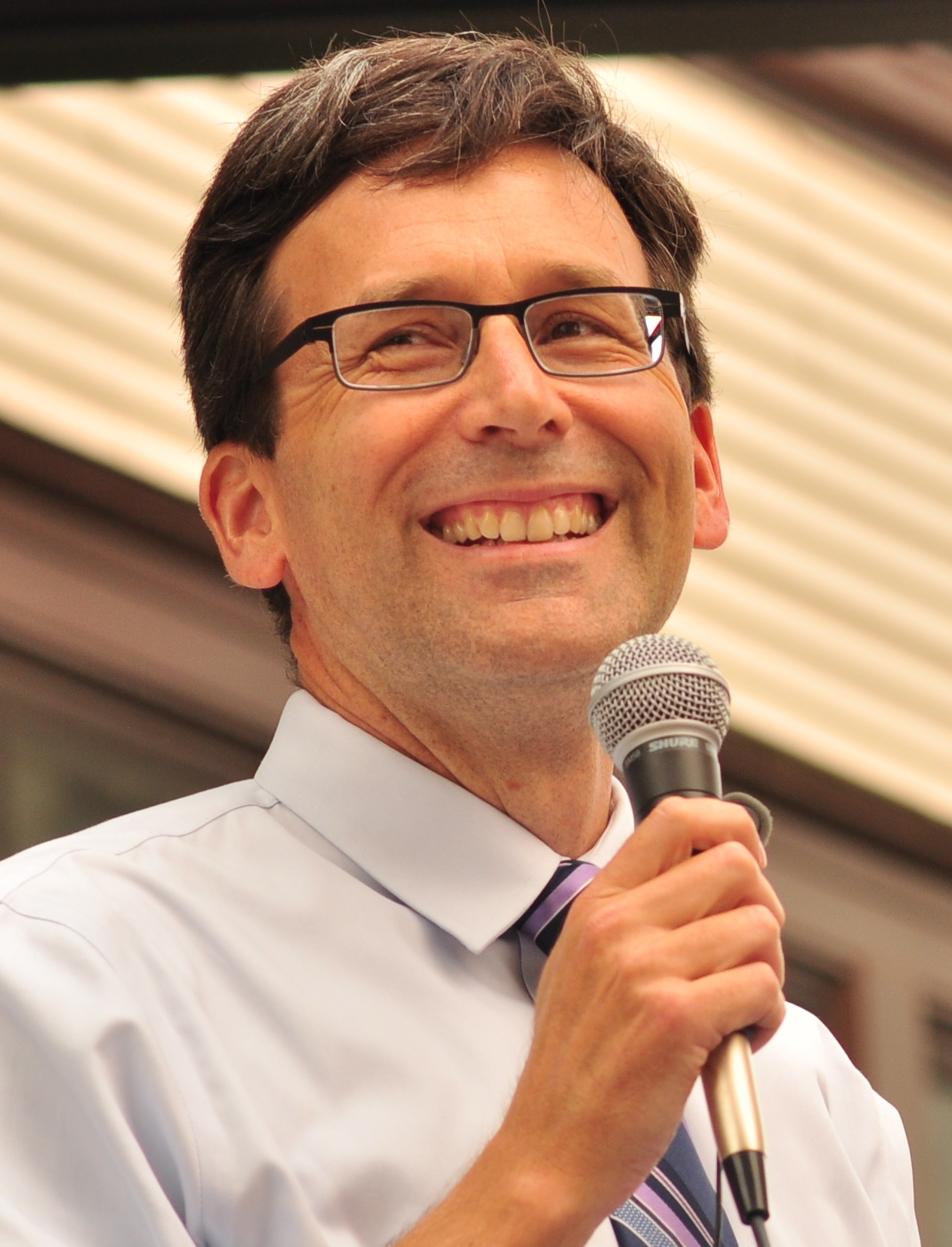

Nominee	Bob Ferguson	Joshua B. Trumbull
Party	Democratic	Libertarian
Popular vote	2,000,804	979,105
Percentage	66.9%	32.8%
- County results Ferguson: 50–60% 60–70% 70–80% Trumbull: 50–60%
Attorney General before election
Bob Ferguson
Democratic
Elected Attorney General
Bob Ferguson
Democratic

Incumbent Democratic Attorney General Bob Ferguson sought re-election, opposed by Joshua B. Trumbull, who ran as a Libertarian. In the general election, Ferguson won re-election to a second term, defeating Trumbull.

Washington blanket primary
Party	Candidate	Votes	%
Democratic	Bob Ferguson (incumbent)	906,493	72.61
Libertarian	Joshua B. Trumbull	341,932	27.39
Total votes		1,248,425	100.00

Washington general election
Party	Candidate	Votes	%
Democratic	Bob Ferguson (incumbent)	2,000,804	66.93
Libertarian	Joshua B. Trumbull	979,105	32.75
Write-in		9,567	0.32
Total votes		2,989,476	100.00
Democratic hold			

== West Virginia ==
2016 West Virginia Attorney General election
- November 8, 2016
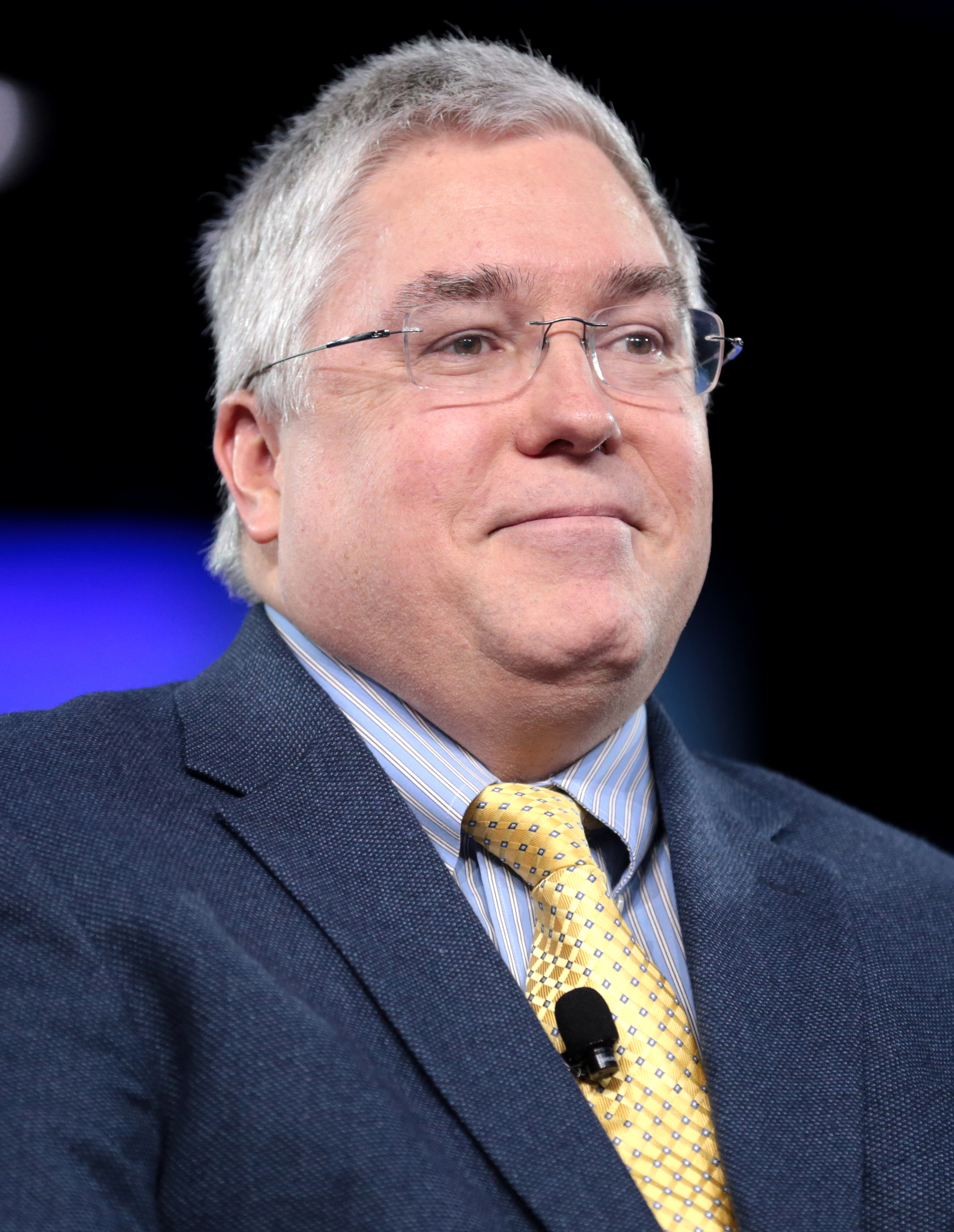

Nominee	Patrick Morrisey	Doug Reynolds
Party	Republican	Democratic
Popular vote	358,424	291,232
Percentage	51.6%	42.0%
- County results Morrisey: 40–50% 50–60% 60–70% 70–80% Reynolds: 40–50% 50–60%
Attorney General before election
Patrick Morrisey
Republican
Elected Attorney General
Patrick Morrisey
Republican

Incumbent Republican Attorney General Patrick Morrisey ran for re-election to a second term. He faced Democratic state delegate Doug Reynolds in the general election, with both being unopposed in their respective primaries. Morrisey won the general election.

West Virginia Republican primary
Party	Candidate	Votes	%
Republican	Patrick Morrisey (incumbent)	157,369	100.00
Total votes		157,369	100.00

West Virginia Democratic primary
Party	Candidate	Votes	%
Democratic	Doug Reynolds	187,786	100.00
Total votes		187,786	100.00

West Virginia general election
Party	Candidate	Votes	%
Republican	Patrick Morrisey (incumbent)	358,424	51.64
Democratic	Doug Reynolds	291,232	41.96
Libertarian	Karl Kolenich	24,023	3.46
Mountain	Michael Sharley	20,475	2.95
Total votes		694,154	100.00
Republican hold			
