= 2008 Utah Attorney General election =

- November 4, 2008
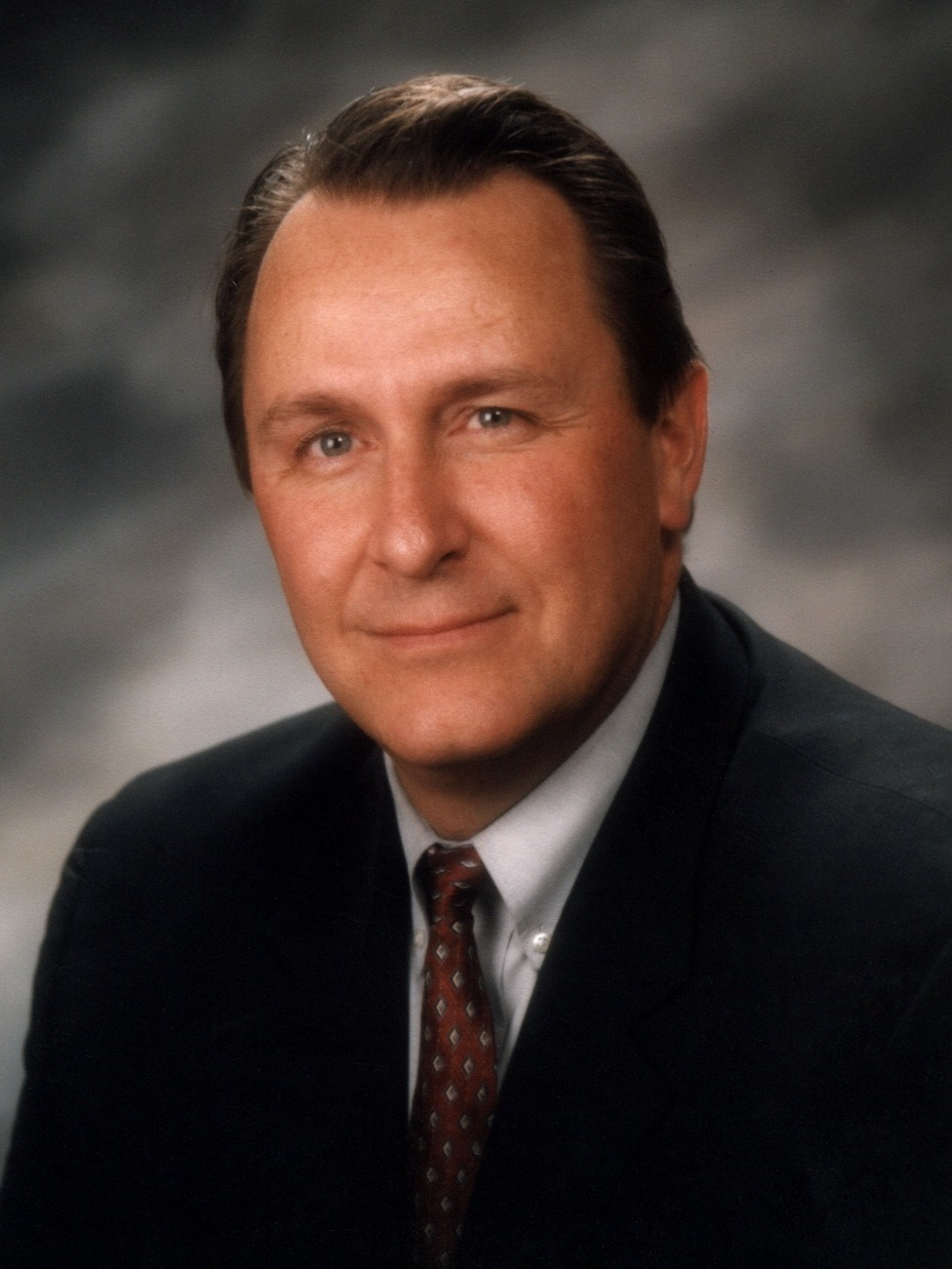

Nominee	Mark Shurtleff	Jean Welch Hill
Party	Republican	Democratic
Popular vote	650,147	249,492
Percentage	69.32%	26.60%
- County results Shurtleff: 50–60% 60–70% 70–80% 80–90% Welch Hill: 40–50%
Attorney General before election
Mark Shurtleff
Republican
Elected Attorney General
Mark Shurtleff
Republican

The 2008 Utah Attorney General election was held on November 4, 2008. Republican Mark Shurtleff, incumbent Attorney General of Utah, was elected to his third term in office, defeating Jean Welch Hill in a landslide. This election was Shurtleff's best statewide performance, overperforming Republican presidential nominee John McCain in the concurrent presidential election by 14%. This was the first time Grand County had voted against Shurtleff.

== General election ==
=== Candidates ===
- Mark Shurtleff, incumbent Attorney General of Utah (Republican)
- Jean Welch Hill, prosecutor and counsel to the Utah System of Higher Education (Democratic)
- W. Andrew McCullough, perennial candidate, Libertarian nominee for this office in 1996, 2000 and 2004 (Libertarian)

=== Results ===
2008 Utah Attorney General election
Party	Candidate	Votes	%	±%
Republican	Mark Shurtleff	650,147	69.32%	▲0.96
Democratic	Jean Welch Hill	255,779	26.60%	▼1.84
Libertarian	W. Andrew McCullough	38,231	4.08%	▲0.89
Total votes		937,870	100.00%	N/A
Republican hold				

== See also ==
- 2008 Utah gubernatorial election
