= One vote =

One vote can refer to:

- One man, one vote, a political slogan
- one member, one vote, an election process in the UK and Canada
- One share, one vote, a standard in corporate governance
- one vote, one value, an election principle in Australia
- ONE Vote, a campaign run by the ONE Campaign
- One Vote (film), 2018 documentary film

== See also ==
- List of close election results, for a list of election decided by a single vote
