= 2004 Utah Attorney General election =

- November 2, 2004
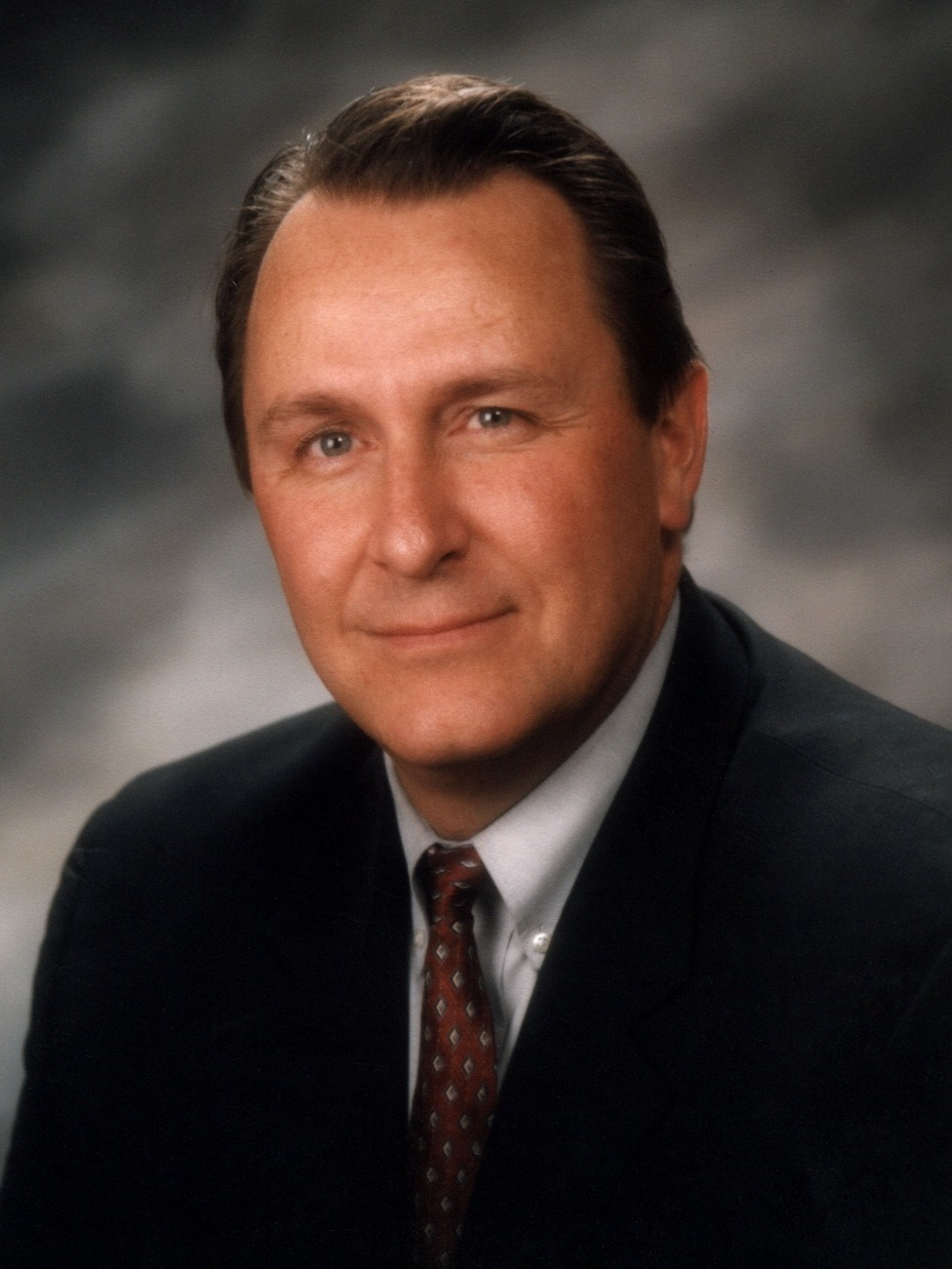

Nominee	Mark Shurtleff	Greg Skordas
Party	Republican	Democratic
Popular vote	614,742	255,779
Percentage	68.36%	28.44%
- County results Shurtleff: 50–60% 60–70% 70–80% 80–90%
Attorney General before election
Mark Shurtleff
Republican
Elected Attorney General
Mark Shurtleff
Republican

The 2004 Utah Attorney General election was held on November 5, 2004. Republican Mark Shurtleff, a member of the Salt Lake County Commission, was elected to his second term in office, defeating Greg Skordas in a landslide.

== General election ==
=== Candidates ===
- Mark Shurtleff, member of the Salt Lake County Commission (Republican)
- Greg Skordas, Salt Lake County chief deputy attorney (Democratic)
- W. Andrew McCullough, Libertarian nominee in 1996 and 2000 (Libertarian)

=== Results ===
2004 Utah Attorney General election
Party	Candidate	Votes	%	±%
Republican	Mark Shurtleff	614,742	68.36%	▲10.84
Democratic	Greg Skordas	255,779	28.44%	▼11.10
Libertarian	W. Andrew McCullough	28,704	3.19%	▲0.25
Total votes		757,944	100.00%	N/A
Republican hold				

== See also ==
- 2004 Utah gubernatorial election
