= 2016 United States elections =

- ← 2014 2015 2016 2017 2018 → Presidential election year
- Election day: November 8
- Incumbent president: ▌Barack Obama (D)
- Next Congress: 115th

Presidential election
- Partisan control: Republican gain
- Popular vote margin: Democratic +2.1%
- Electoral vote
- Donald Trump (R): 304
- Hillary Clinton (D): 227
- Others: 7
- Presidential election results map. Red denotes states won by Trump/Pence, blue denotes states won by Clinton/Kaine. Numbers indicate electoral votes allotted to the winner of each state. Seven faithless electors cast votes for various individuals.

Senate elections
- Overall control: Republican hold
- Seats contested: 34 of 100 seats
- Net seat change: Democratic +2
- 2016 Senate results Democratic hold Republican hold Democratic gain

House elections
- Overall control: Republican hold
- Seats contested: All 435 voting-members and 6 non-voting delegates
- Popular vote margin: Republican +1.1%
- Net seat change: Democratic +6
- Map of the 2016 House races (delegate races not shown) Democratic hold Republican hold Democratic gain Republican gain

Gubernatorial elections
- Seats contested: 14 (12 states, two territories)
- Net seat change: Republican +2
- Map of the 2016 gubernatorial elections Democratic hold Republican hold Democratic gain Republican gain New Progressive gain Nonpartisan

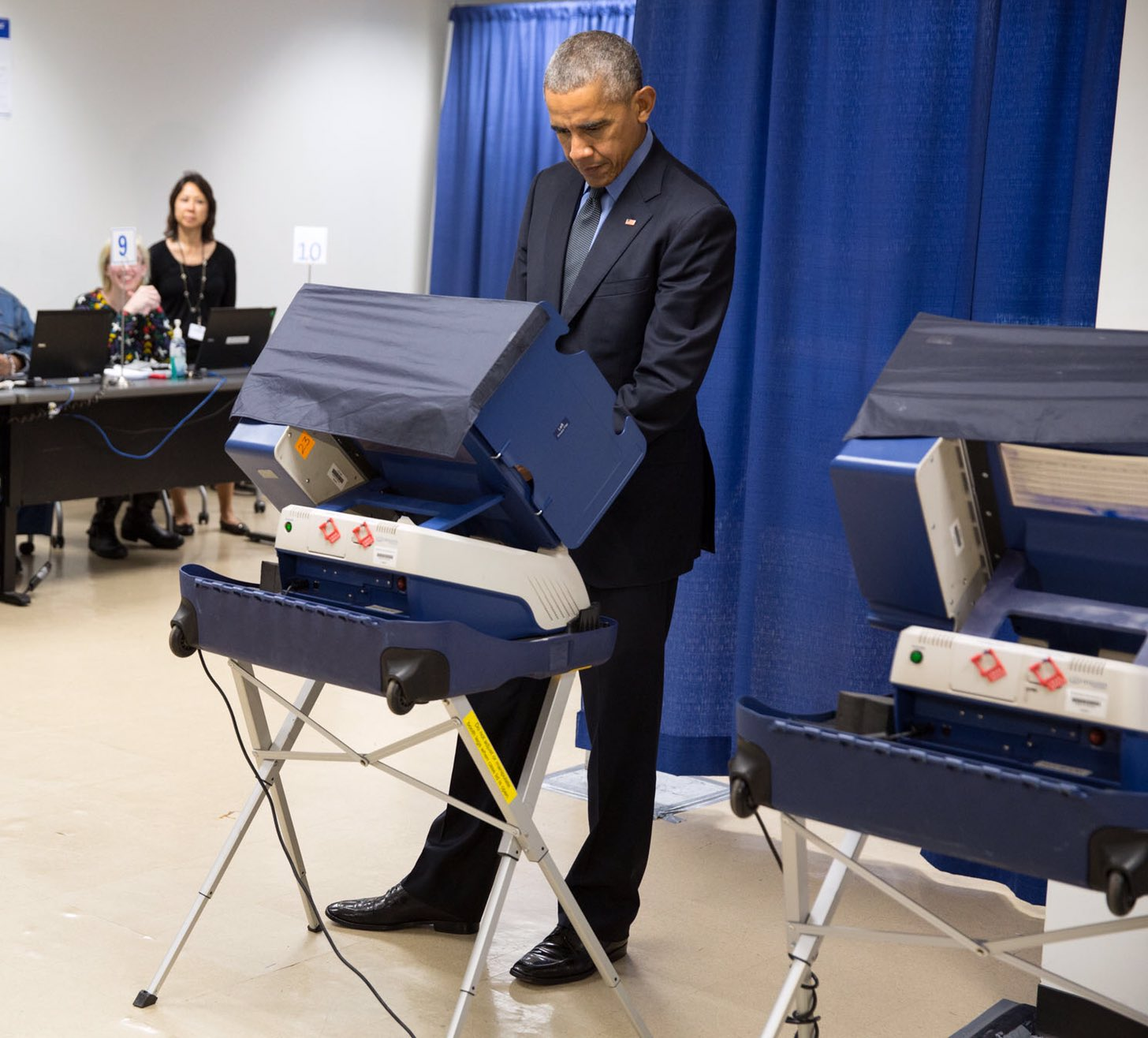
Then-incumbent President Barack Obama casts his vote early in Chicago on October 7, 2016

Elections were held in the United States on November 8, 2016. Republican businessman and media celebrity Donald Trump defeated Democratic former Secretary of State Hillary Clinton in the presidential election, and the Republicans retained their majorities in both chambers of Congress. This marked the first time since 2004 that the Republicans controlled both Congress and the presidency in the same election, something that would not occur again until 2024.

Democrats won a net gain of two seats in the Senate and six seats in the House of Representatives, but Republicans retained control of both chambers. In the gubernatorial elections, Republicans won a net gain of two seats. Various other state, territorial, and local races and referendums were held throughout the year. This was the first election cycle since 2000 where the winning candidate failed to have coattails in either house of Congress, and the last election where one party simultaneously gained seats in both houses of Congress until 2026.

Trump won his party's nomination after defeating Ted Cruz and several other candidates in the 2016 Republican presidential primaries. With Democratic president Barack Obama term-limited, Clinton secured the nomination over Bernie Sanders in the 2016 Democratic presidential primaries. Trump won the general election with 304 of the 538 electoral votes, although Clinton won the popular vote by a margin of 2.1%.

Wall Street banks and other big financial institutions spent a record $2 billion trying to influence the 2016 United States elections. In the presidential election, Clinton outspent Trump approximately two-to-one.

== Issues ==
Trump's right-wing populist nationalist campaign, which promised to "Make America Great Again" and opposed political correctness, illegal immigration, and many United States free-trade agreements garnered extensive free media coverage due to Trump's inflammatory comments. Clinton emphasized her extensive political experience, denounced Trump and many of his supporters as a "basket of deplorables", bigots and extremists, and advocated the expansion of President Obama's policies; racial, LGBT, and women's rights; and inclusive capitalism.

=== Russian interference ===
The United States government's intelligence agencies concluded the Russian government interfered in the 2016 United States elections. A joint US intelligence review stated with high confidence that, "Russian President Vladimir Putin ordered an influence campaign in 2016 aimed at the US presidential election. In May 2019, Republican Florida Governor Ron DeSantis announced Russians hacked voting databases in two Florida counties prior to the 2016 presidential election and no election results were compromised.

=== Candidate campaigns and exit poll results ===
The election saw an aggressive set of campaigns from both Trump and Clinton leading up to the election, Clinton's being of particular interest when considering the exit polls and voter demographics. With her gender presenting as the biggest target for Trump's campaign as a point of criticism, the Clinton campaign made a conscious decision to capitalize on the negativity surrounding her gender to appeal to female voters (young women in particular) by co-opting feminist ideals alongside traditional democratic ones. The party's social media campaign was particularly aggressive, with the use of hashtags and celebrity endorsement being crucial to Clinton's appeal to the wider public. This backfired however, when exit polls showed that, while Clinton was popular with the female vote, it was Trump who had won the favour of a majority white female demographic, with some citing political 'wokeness' as a voter turn-off.

== Federal elections ==
=== Presidential election ===
The United States presidential election of 2016 was the 58th quadrennial presidential election. The electoral vote distribution was determined by the 2010 census from which presidential electors electing the president and vice president were chosen; a simple majority (270) of the 538 electoral votes were required to win. In one of the greatest election upsets in U.S. History, businessman and reality television personality Donald Trump of New York won the Republican Party's presidential nomination on July 19, 2016, after defeating Texas Senator Ted Cruz, Ohio Governor John Kasich, Florida Senator Marco Rubio, and several other candidates in the Republican primary elections.^{[1]} Former Secretary of State, First Lady and New York Senator Hillary Clinton won the Democratic Party's presidential nomination on July 26, 2016, after a tough battle with Vermont Senator Bernie Sanders in the Democratic primary elections. This was the first election with a female presidential nominee from a major political party, as well as the first election since 1944 that had major party presidential nominees from the same home state.

Clinton won the popular vote, taking 48% of the vote compared to Trump's 46% of the vote, but Trump won the electoral vote and thus the presidency. The election is one of five presidential elections in American history that the winner of the popular vote did not win the presidency. Libertarian Gary Johnson won 3.3% of the popular vote, the strongest performance by a third party presidential nominee since the 1996 election. Trump flipped the states of Michigan, Pennsylvania, Wisconsin, Florida, Ohio, and Iowa, that were won by Obama in 2008 and 2012. The former two last voted Republican in 1988 and Wisconsin last did so in 1984.

=== Congressional elections ===
==== Senate elections ====
All seats in Senate Class 3 were up for election. Democrats won a net gain of two seats, but Republicans retained a majority with 52 seats in the 100-member chamber.

==== House of Representatives elections ====
All 435 voting seats in the United States House of Representatives were up for election. Additionally, elections were held to select the delegates for the District of Columbia and the U.S. territories, including the Resident Commissioner of Puerto Rico.

Democrats won a net gain of six seats, but Republicans held a 241-to-194 majority following the elections. Nationwide, Republicans won the popular vote for the House of Representatives by a margin of 1.1 percent.

== State elections ==
=== Gubernatorial elections ===
Regular elections were held for the governorships of 11 U.S. states and two U.S. territories. Additionally, a special election was held in Oregon after the resignation of John Kitzhaber as governor. Republicans won a net gain of two seats by winning open seats in Missouri, Vermont, and New Hampshire while Democrats defeated an incumbent in North Carolina. However, Governor Jim Justice of West Virginia switched his party affiliation to Republican shortly after his inauguration, thereby netting Republicans 3 seats and giving them 34 seats nationwide, tying their record set in the 1921 elections.

=== Legislative elections ===
In 2016, 44 states held state legislative elections; 86 of the 99 chambers were up for election. Only six states did not hold state legislative elections: Louisiana, Mississippi, New Jersey, Virginia, Alabama, and Maryland.

Democrats won both chambers in the Nevada Legislature and the New Mexico House of Representatives, while Republicans won the Kentucky House of Representatives, the Iowa Senate, and the Minnesota Senate. The Alaska House of Representatives flipped from Republican control to a Democrat-led coalition majority, and the Connecticut State Senate went from Democratic control to tied control. Meanwhile, the New York Senate went from Republican to a Republican-led coalition.

=== Other elections ===
Many states also held elections for other elected offices:

==== Attorney General elections ====
In the 2016 United States attorney general elections, Republicans gained one seat in Missouri.

=== Ballot Measures ===
Many states had voters reject or approve ballot measures.

== Local elections ==
=== Mayoral elections ===
Mayoral elections were held in many cities, including:

- Bakersfield, California: Incumbent Harvey Hall did not seek re-election. Karen Goh was elected to succeed Hall. The office is not partisan.
- Baltimore, Maryland: Incumbent Democrat Stephanie Rawlings-Blake did not seek re-election. Democrat Catherine E. Pugh was elected as Rawlings-Blake's replacement.
- Gilbert, Arizona: Incumbent John Lewis resigned prior to the election. Interim mayor Jenn Daniels was elected to succeed Lewis. The office is not partisan.
- Honolulu, Hawaii: Incumbent Democrat Kirk Caldwell won re-election to a second term.
- Milwaukee, Wisconsin: Incumbent Tom Barrett was re-elected to a fourth term. The office is not partisan.
- Portland, Oregon: Incumbent Charlie Hales did not seek re-election. Ted Wheeler was elected to succeed Hales. The office is not partisan.
- Richmond, Virginia: Incumbent Dwight C. Jones was term-limited and cannot seek re-election. Levar Stoney was elected as the new Richmond, VA, mayor. The office is not partisan.
- Sacramento, California: Incumbent Democrat Kevin Johnson did not seek re-election. Democrat Darrell Steinberg was elected as Johnson's replacement.
- San Diego, California: Incumbent Kevin Faulconer won a second term as mayor. The office is not partisan.
- Tulsa, Oklahoma: Incumbent Republican Dewey F. Bartlett Jr. was defeated by city councilor and fellow Republican G. T. Bynum.

=== Other local elections ===
The citizens of the City of Virginia Beach voted against expanding Norfolk's Tide lightrail into their city.

== Table of state, territorial, and federal results ==
This table shows the partisan results of congressional, gubernatorial, presidential, and state legislative races held in each state and territory in 2016. Note that not all states and territories hold gubernatorial, state legislative, and United States Senate elections in 2016; additionally, the territories do not have electoral votes in American presidential elections, and neither Washington, D.C. nor the territories elect members of the United States Senate. Washington, D.C., and the five inhabited territories each elect one non-voting member of the United States House of Representatives. Nebraska's unicameral legislature and the governorship and legislature of American Samoa are officially non-partisan. In the table, offices/legislatures that are not up for election in 2016 are already filled in for the "after 2016 elections" section, although vacancies or party switching could potentially lead to a flip in partisan control.

Subdivision and PVI		Before 2016 elections				After 2016 elections				
Subdivision	PVI	Governor	State leg.	US Senate	US House	Pres.	Governor	State leg.	US Senate	US House
Alabama	R+14	Rep	Rep	Rep	Rep 6–1	Rep	Rep	Rep	Rep	Rep 6–1
Alaska	R+12	Ind	Rep	Rep	Rep 1–0	Rep	Ind	Split	Rep	Rep 1–0
Arizona	R+7	Rep	Rep	Rep	Rep 5–4	Rep	Rep	Rep	Rep	Rep 5–4
Arkansas	R+14	Rep	Rep	Rep	Rep 4–0	Rep	Rep	Rep	Rep	Rep 4–0
California	D+9	Dem	Dem	Dem	Dem 39–14	Dem	Dem	Dem	Dem	Dem 39–14
Colorado	D+1	Dem	Split	Split	Rep 4–3	Dem	Dem	Split	Split	Rep 4–3
Connecticut	D+7	Dem	Dem	Dem	Dem 5–0	Dem	Dem	Split	Dem	Dem 5–0
Delaware	D+8	Dem	Dem	Dem	Dem 1–0	Dem	Dem	Dem	Dem	Dem 1–0
Florida	R+2	Rep	Rep	Split	Rep 17–10	Rep	Rep	Rep	Split	Rep 16–11
Georgia	R+6	Rep	Rep	Rep	Rep 10–4	Rep	Rep	Rep	Rep	Rep 10–4
Hawaii	D+20	Dem	Dem	Dem	Dem 2–0	Dem	Dem	Dem	Dem	Dem 2–0
Idaho	R+18	Rep	Rep	Rep	Rep 2–0	Rep	Rep	Rep	Rep	Rep 2–0
Illinois	D+8	Rep	Dem	Split	Dem 10–8	Dem	Rep	Dem	Dem	Dem 11–7
Indiana	R+5	Rep	Rep	Split	Rep 7–2	Rep	Rep	Rep	Split	Rep 7–2
Iowa	D+1	Rep	Split	Rep	Rep 3–1	Rep	Rep	Rep	Rep	Rep 3–1
Kansas	R+12	Rep	Rep	Rep	Rep 4–0	Rep	Rep	Rep	Rep	Rep 4–0
Kentucky	R+13	Rep	Split	Rep	Rep 5–1	Rep	Rep	Rep	Rep	Rep 5–1
Louisiana	R+12	Dem	Rep	Rep	Rep 5–1	Rep	Dem	Rep	Rep	Rep 5–1
Maine	D+5	Rep	Split	Split R/I (Note: One of Maine's senators is a Republican, the other (Angus King) is an independent who has caucused with the Democrats since taking office in 2013.)	Split 1–1	Dem	Rep	Split	Split R/I	Split 1–1
Maryland	D+10	Rep	Dem	Dem	Dem 7–1	Dem	Rep	Dem	Dem	Dem 7–1
Massachusetts	D+10	Rep	Dem	Dem	Dem 9–0	Dem	Rep	Dem	Dem	Dem 9–0
Michigan	D+4	Rep	Rep	Dem	Rep 9–5	Rep	Rep	Rep	Dem	Rep 9–5
Minnesota	D+2	Dem	Split	Dem	Dem 5–3	Dem	Dem	Rep	Dem	Dem 5–3
Mississippi	R+9	Rep	Rep	Rep	Rep 3–1	Rep	Rep	Rep	Rep	Rep 3–1
Missouri	R+5	Dem	Rep	Split	Rep 6–2	Rep	Rep	Rep	Split	Rep 6–2
Montana	R+7	Dem	Rep	Split	Rep 1–0	Rep	Dem	Rep	Split	Rep 1–0
Nebraska	R+12	Rep	NP	Rep	Rep 2–1	Rep	Rep	NP	Rep	Rep 3–0
Nevada	D+2	Rep	Rep	Split	Rep 3–1	Dem	Rep	Dem	Split	Dem 3–1
New Hampshire	D+1	Dem	Rep	Split	Split 1–1	Dem	Rep	Rep	Dem	Dem 2–0
New Jersey	D+6	Rep	Dem	Dem	Split 6–6	Dem	Rep	Dem	Dem	Dem 7–5
New Mexico	D+4	Rep	Split	Dem	Dem 2–1	Dem	Rep	Dem	Dem	Dem 2–1
New York	D+11	Dem	Split (Note: In New York and Washington, Democrats control the House and a coalition of Republicans and Democrats control the Senate.)	Dem	Dem 18–9	Dem	Dem	Split	Dem	Dem 18–9
North Carolina	R+3	Rep	Rep	Rep	Rep 10–3	Rep	Dem	Rep	Rep	Rep 10–3
North Dakota	R+10	Rep	Rep	Split	Rep 1–0	Rep	Rep	Rep	Split	Rep 1–0
Ohio	R+1	Rep	Rep	Split	Rep 12–4	Rep	Rep	Rep	Split	Rep 12–4
Oklahoma	R+19	Rep	Rep	Rep	Rep 5–0	Rep	Rep	Rep	Rep	Rep 5–0
Oregon	D+5	Dem	Dem	Dem	Dem 4–1	Dem	Dem	Dem	Dem	Dem 4–1
Pennsylvania	D+1	Dem	Rep	Split	Rep 13–5	Rep	Dem	Rep	Split	Rep 13–5
Rhode Island	D+11	Dem	Dem	Dem	Dem 2–0	Dem	Dem	Dem	Dem	Dem 2–0
South Carolina	R+8	Rep	Rep	Rep	Rep 6–1	Rep	Rep	Rep	Rep	Rep 6–1
South Dakota	R+10	Rep	Rep	Rep	Rep 1–0	Rep	Rep	Rep	Rep	Rep 1–0
Tennessee	R+12	Rep	Rep	Rep	Rep 7–2	Rep	Rep	Rep	Rep	Rep 7–2
Texas	R+10	Rep	Rep	Rep	Rep 25–11	Rep	Rep	Rep	Rep	Rep 25–11
Utah	R+22	Rep	Rep	Rep	Rep 4–0	Rep	Rep	Rep	Rep	Rep 4–0
Vermont	D+16	Dem	Dem	Split D/I (Note: One of Vermont's senators is a Democrat, the other (Bernie Sanders) was elected as an independent but has caucused with the Democrats since taking office in 2007.)	Dem 1–0	Dem	Rep	Dem	Split D/I	Dem 1–0
Virginia	Even	Dem	Rep	Dem	Rep 8–3	Dem	Dem	Rep	Dem	Rep 7–4
Washington	D+5	Dem	Split	Dem	Dem 6–4	Dem	Dem	Split	Dem	Dem 6–4
West Virginia	R+13	Dem	Rep	Split	Rep 3–0	Rep	Dem	Rep	Split	Rep 3–0
Wisconsin	D+2	Rep	Rep	Split	Rep 5–3	Rep	Rep	Rep	Split	Rep 5–3
Wyoming	R+22	Rep	Rep	Rep	Rep 1–0	Rep	Rep	Rep	Rep	Rep 1–0
United States	Even	Rep 31–18	Rep 30–11	Rep 54–46 (Note: Including two Independents who caucus with the Democrats.)	Rep 247–188	Rep	Rep 33–16	Rep 32–13	Rep 52–48	Rep 241–194
Washington, D.C.	D+40	Dem (Note: Washington, D.C. does not elect a governor, but it does elect a mayor.)	Dem	—N/a	Dem	Dem	Dem	Dem	—N/a	Dem
American Samoa	—N/a	NP/I (Note: Although elections for governor of American Samoa are non-partisan, Governor Lolo Matalasi Moliga was an Independent when first elected governor in 2014.)	NP	—N/a	Rep	—N/a	NP/D (Note: With the 2016 election, Governor Lolo Matalasi Moliga affiliated himself with the Democratic Party at the national level.)	NP	—N/a	Rep
Guam	—N/a	Rep	Dem	—N/a	Dem	Dem (Note: Although Guam does not have a vote in the Electoral College, the territory has held a presidential advisory vote for every presidential election since 1980.)	Rep	Dem	—N/a	Dem
N. Mariana Islands	—N/a	Rep	Split	—N/a	Ind (Note: Delegate Gregorio Sablan was elected as an independent, but he has caucused with the Democrats since taking office in 2009.)	—N/a	Rep	Rep	—N/a	Ind
Puerto Rico	—N/a	PDP/D (Note: Governor Alejandro García Padilla is a member of the Popular Democratic Party, but also affiliates with the Democratic Party at the national level.)	PDP	—N/a	PNP/D (Note: Resident Commissioner Pedro Pierluisi is a member of the New Progressive Party, but he has caucused with the Democrats since taking office in 2009.)	—N/a	PNP/D (Note: Governor Ricardo Rosselló is a member of the New Progressive Party, but also affiliates with the Democratic Party at the national level.)	PNP	—N/a	PNP/R (Note: Resident Commissioner Jenniffer González is member of the New Progressive Party, but she has caucused with the Republicans since taking office in 2017.)
U.S. Virgin Islands	—N/a	Ind	Dem	—N/a	Dem	—N/a	Ind	Dem	—N/a	Dem
Subdivision	PVI	Governor	State leg.	US Senate	US House	Pres.	Governor	State leg.	US Senate	US House
Subdivision and PVI		Before 2016 elections				After 2016 elections				

=== Partisan control of statewide offices ===
Italics indicate office was not up for election in 2016.

	Before 2016 elections						After 2016 elections					
State	Governor	Lieutenant Governor	Secretary of State	Attorney General	Treasurer	Auditor	Governor	Lieutenant Governor	Secretary of State	Attorney General	Treasurer	Auditor
Indiana	Rep	Rep	Rep	Rep	Rep	Rep	Rep	Rep	Rep	Rep	Rep	Rep
Missouri	Dem	Rep	Dem	Dem	Dem	Dem	Rep	Rep	Rep	Rep	Rep	Dem
Montana	Dem	Dem	Dem	Rep		Dem	Dem	Dem	Rep	Rep		Rep
North Carolina	Rep	Rep	Dem	Dem	Dem	Dem	Dem	Rep	Dem	Dem	Rep	Dem
Oregon	Dem		Dem	Dem	Dem		Dem		Rep	Dem	Dem	
Pennsylvania	Dem	Dem		Dem	Ind	Dem	Dem	Dem		Dem	Dem	Dem
Utah	Rep	Rep		Rep	Rep	Rep	Rep	Rep		Rep	Rep	Rep
Vermont	Dem	Rep	Dem	Dem	Dem	Dem	Rep	Prog	Dem	Dem	Dem	Dem
Washington	Dem	Dem	Rep	Dem	Dem	Dem	Dem	Dem	Rep	Dem	Rep	Dem
West Virginia	Dem		Dem	Rep	Dem	Dem	Dem		Rep	Rep	Dem	Rep

== See also ==
- One Vote – documentary film about the 2016 election
