= 1992 Utah Attorney General election =

- November 3, 1992

Nominee	Jan Graham	Scott Burns
Party	Democratic	Republican
Popular vote	364,119	358,766
Percentage	49.17%	48.44%
- County results Graham: 50–60% 60–70% 70–80% Burns: 40–50% 50–60% 60–70% 70–80%
Attorney General before election
Paul Van Dam
Democratic
Elected Attorney General
Jan Graham
Democratic

The 1992 Utah Attorney General election was held on November 3, 1992, in order to elect the Attorney General of Utah. Democratic nominee Jan Graham defeated Republican nominee Scott Burns and Libertarian nominee John M. Coombs.

== General election ==
On election day, November 3, 1992, Democratic nominee Jan Graham won the election by a margin of 5,353 votes against her foremost opponent Republican nominee Scott Burns, thereby retaining Democratic control over the office of Attorney General and thus becoming the first woman elected to this office. Graham was sworn in as the 18th Attorney General of Utah on January 3, 1993 and was re-elected in 1996 in a rematch with Burns.

=== Results ===
Utah Attorney General election, 1992
Party	Candidate	Votes	%
Democratic	Jan Graham	364,119	49.17%
Republican	Scott Burns	358,766	48.44%
Libertarian	John M. Coombs	17,690	2.39%
Total votes		740,575	100.00%
Democratic hold			

== See also ==
- 1992 Utah gubernatorial election
