= 2014 Utah elections =

A general election was held in the U.S. State of Utah on November 4, 2014. The state's four seats in the United States House of Representatives are up for election and there was a special election for Utah's attorney general. Primary elections were held on June 24, 2014.

== Attorney general special election ==
=== Background ===
Republican Attorney General John Swallow resigned in December 2013, less than a year into his first term, following multiple investigations into alleged bribery and campaign finance violations.

=== Appointment ===
Pursuant to Utah law, Governor Gary Herbert was required to pick a replacement from three names chosen by the Utah Republican Party Central Committee. Nine Republican candidates put their names forward for consideration. They were:

- Scott Burns, former Iron County attorney, former deputy director for State and Local Affairs at the ONDCP and nominee for attorney general in 1992 and 1996
- Michelle Mumford, an attorney, assistant dean of admissions at the Brigham Young University law school and secretary of the Utah Republican Party
- Bret Rawson, a reserve Bountiful policeman and attorney
- Sean Reyes, an attorney who lost to Swallow in the primary in 2012
- Stephen Sorenson, a retired prosecutor and former head of the litigation division of the Attorney General's office
- Robert Smith, an attorney and managing director of Brigham Young University's International Center for Law and Religion Studies
- Brian Tarbet, a retired Adjutant General of the Utah National Guard and the Acting Attorney General
- Brent Ward, former United States Attorney for the District of Utah and a candidate for the U.S. Senate in 1992
- Michael J. Wilkins, a former justice of the Utah Supreme Court and former chairman of the Utah Independent Ethics Commission.

Burns, Sorensen, Tarbet and Wilkins all said they would not run in the special election if chosen.

Sorenson withdrew from contention on December 9, 2013, with Ward also withdrawing two days later. A debate was held on December 11 and Reyes, Smith and Tarbet were chosen as the finalists by the Central Committee on December 14. Herbert chose Reyes on December 23, who was sworn in on December 30, 2013.

=== Special election ===
A special election was thus be held for the remaining two years of Swallow's term, with the office then up for the regularly scheduled election in 2016. Reyes was unopposed in the Republican primary. Opposing him in the general election were Democratic rancher and attorney Charles A. Stormont, American Independent Party nominee Leslie Curtis, Constitution Party nominee Gregory Hansen and Libertarian nominee Andrew McCullough, a perennial candidate for office.

==== Polling ====
Poll source	Date(s) administered	Sample size	Margin of error	Sean Reyes (R)	Charles A. Stormont (D)	Other	Undecided
Brigham Young University	October 15–22, 2014	159	± 3.42%	47%	27%	7%	19%

Results by county Reyes: 50–60%; 60–70%; 70–80%; 80–90%; Stormont: 40–50%

== United States House of Representatives ==
Utah's four seats in the United States House of Representatives will be up for election in 2014.
