= One Vote (film) =

One Vote is a non-partisan documentary film portrayal of the American voter, directed by Christine Woodhouse. Filmed in five locations on Election Day 2016, the film captures the personal stories of diverse American voters, including Warren Buffett of Omaha, NE; Dr. Brenda Williams of Sumter, SC; Michael Hiser of Shepherdsville, KY; Jennifer, Claude and Robert Bondy of Alaska; and Jim Higgins, the owner of Club Lucky in Chicago, IL.

== Release ==
One Vote premiered at the Omaha Film Festival on March 10, 2018. All of the film's major cast members, including Warren Buffett, appeared at the premiere. Throughout 2018, the film was screened at several other festivals including the Greenwich International Film Festival, Nashville Film Festival, New Haven Documentary Film Festival, Reel to Reel International Film Festival and the Louisville International Film Festival. In addition, One Vote was screened at more than 60 college and university campuses in the lead-up to the 2018 midterm elections.

The film was subsequently released on multiple streaming services including iTunes, Amazon, Google, Vudu and Vimeo on August 8, 2020, three months prior to the 2020 Presidential Election.

== Stories ==
The five stories featured in One Vote are interwoven throughout the film, which follows the cast members' Election Day journeys from dawn to dusk. In Sumter, South Carolina, gospel-singing physician and voting rights advocate, Dr. Brenda Williams, assists citizens facing shifting voter ID requirements and other challenges to voting on Election Day. In Omaha, Nebraska, billionaire Warren Buffett transports voters needing a ride to the polls via Omaha's iconic "Ollie the Trolley," swapping stories and taking selfies with the citizens of Nebraska's second district. In Shepherdsville, Kentucky, former felon Michael Hiser casts an emotional ballot, voting for the first time since his right to vote was restored due to a pardon from former Kentucky governor, Steve Beshear. In the Bucktown neighborhood of Chicago, Illinois, the staff and voters at Club Lucky, the last tavern polling place remaining in the United States, come together to vote and watch the election results in a celebration that recalls election days past. And finally, on the Denali Highway in Alaska, the owners of the Alpine Lodge, Jennifer, Claude and Bob Bondy, travel more than 222 miles via dogsled, snowmobile and truck to reach their polling place.

== Reception ==
One Vote has received positive reviews from several critics, including Michael Phillips of the Chicago Tribune, who said the film "gives every imminent 2020 voter a lot to absorb and to admire, and does so with tact and concision." Its August, 2020 release was covered by multiple newspapers, T.V. stations and other publications, including the Louisville Courier-Journal, WOWT Omaha, WLKY Louisville, WTNH New Haven, KTUU Anchorage, Film Threat, and the Fairbanks Daily News-Miner, among others.
