= 2000 Utah Attorney General election =

- November 7, 2000
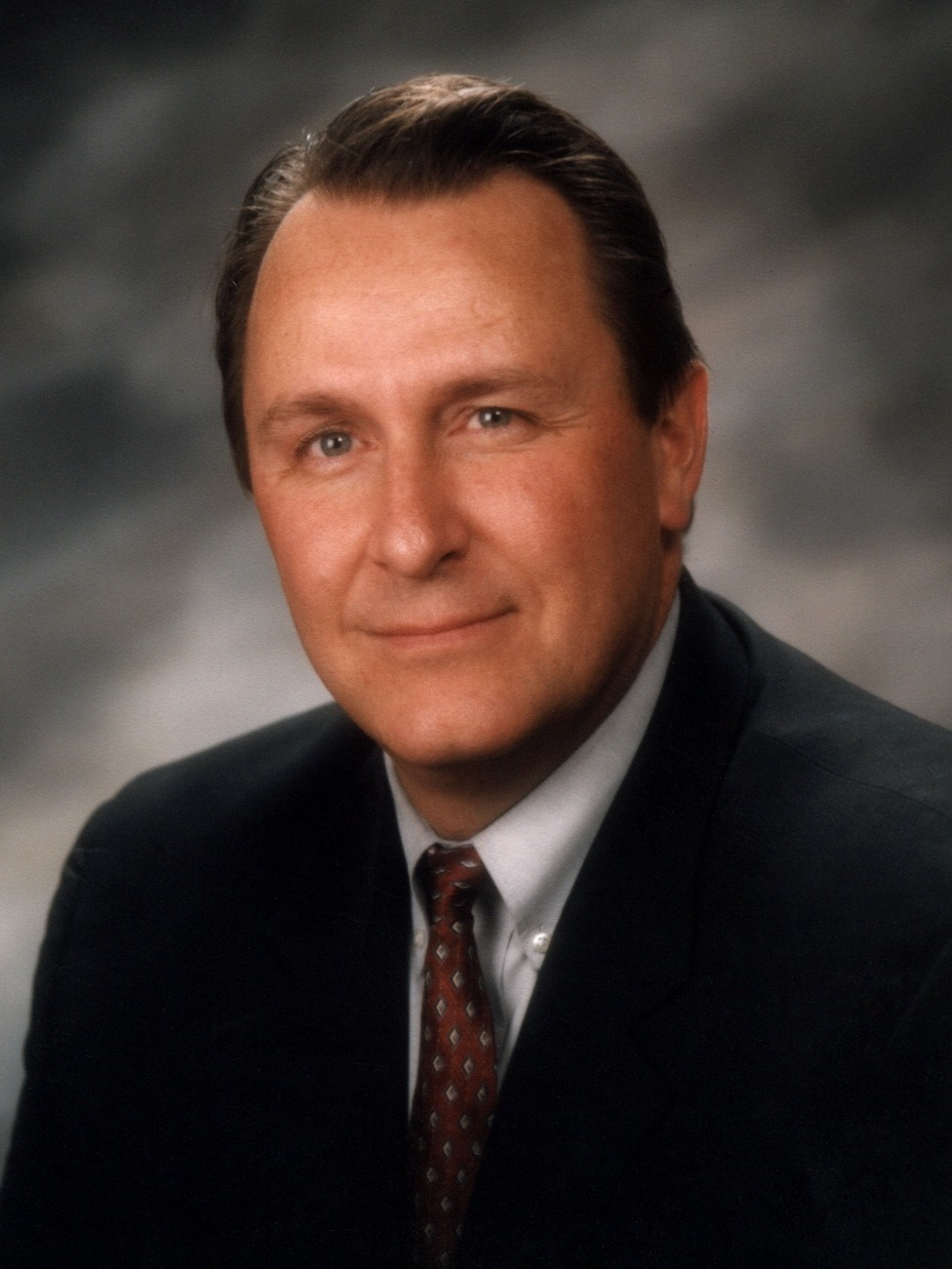

| Nominee | Mark Shurtleff | Reed M. Richards |
| Party | Republican | Democratic |
| Popular vote | 435,988 | 299,683 |
| Percentage | 57.52% | 39.54% |
- County results Shurtleff: 40–50% 50–60% 60–70% 70–80% 80–90% Richards: 50–60%
Attorney General before election
Jan Graham
Democratic
Elected Attorney General
Mark Shurtleff
Republican

The 2000 Utah Attorney General election was held on November 7, 2000. Republican Mark Shurtleff, a member of the Salt Lake County Commission, was elected to his first term in office, defeating Reed M. Richards.

As of 2024, this is the last time the position of attorney general changed partisan affiliation.

== General election ==
=== Candidates ===
- Mark Shurtleff, member of the Salt Lake County Commission (Republican)
- Reed M. Richards, chief deputy state attorney general (Democratic)
- W. Andrew McCullough, Libertarian nominee in 1996 (Libertarian)

=== Results ===
2000 Utah Attorney General election
| Party | Candidate | Votes | % | ±% |
|---|---|---|---|---|
| Republican | Mark Shurtleff | 435,988 | 57.52% | ▲11.49 |
| Democratic | Reed M. Richards | 299,683 | 39.54% | ▼12.87 |
| Libertarian | W. Andrew McCullough | 22,273 | 2.94% | ▲2.41 |
| Total votes | | 757,944 | 100.00% | N/A |
| Republican gain from Democratic | | | | |

== See also ==
- 2000 Utah gubernatorial election
