= Jan Graham =

American politician (1949–2024)

18th Attorney General of Utah
- In office January 1993 – January 2001
- Governor: Mike Leavitt
- Preceded by: Paul Van Dam
- Succeeded by: Mark Shurtleff

Personal details
- Born: Janet Ann Crump; July 19, 1949 Salt Lake City, Utah, U.S.
- Died: January 29, 2024 (aged 74) St. George, Utah, U.S.
- Party: Democratic
- Spouse: Verl "Buzz" Hunt (m. 1989)
- Children: 2
- Education: University of Utah (JD)
- Profession: Lawyer

Janet Ann Graham Hunt (née Crump; July 19, 1949 – January 29, 2024), best-known as Jan Graham, was an American lawyer from Utah who served as State Attorney General from 1993 to 2001. She is the only Democratic woman ever elected to statewide office in the state of Utah. She is the last Democrat to hold statewide office in Utah.

== Early life, education, and legal career ==
Janet Ann Crump was born on July 19, 1949, and raised in Salt Lake City, Utah. She graduated from South High in 1967, and enrolled at Brigham Young University. While at BYU, Crump successfully bypassed BYU’s prohibition on women wearing jeans to its Testing Center by wearing no pants at all, which gave the impression she was wearing a hidden skirt. She transferred to the University of Utah, and then to Clark University in Massachusetts, and graduated in 1971 with a bachelor's degree in psychology.

Crump returned to Salt Lake and enrolled in the University of Utah's graduate school, where she got a master's degree in psychology in 1977. While in graduate school, she worked as a teacher at Franklin Elementary for one year, and as a counselor at the Northwest Multipurpose Center. In 1977, she enrolled in the University of Utah law school, and was awarded her J.D. in 1980. While in law school, she married, and took the name Graham. She subsequently divorced.

Graham was hired at Jones, Waldo, Holbrook and McDonough in 1980. By 1985, she had made partner, and become the first woman on the Board of Directors. In 1989, she married Verl "Buzz" Hunt. She was a founding member of Women Lawyers of Utah, and one of the first four women members of the Alta Club.

== Public office ==
She ran for the office of Attorney General in 1992, while she was pregnant with her first child. She had her baby two days after the State Democratic Convention. In the general election, she defeated Iron County Attorney Scott Burns, getting 49% of the statewide vote. She was re-elected in 1996 in a rematch with Burns with 52% of the vote.

Graham made the state of Utah a plaintiff in landmark tobacco legislation. The litigation included arguments over the Attorney General's power, both from the tobacco companies, and from Utah's Governor, Michael Leavitt. The struggle between Utah's only Democratic statewide officeholder and the state's Republican legislature and Governor resulted in passage of a law requiring the Governor's approval on any civil litigation. The Attorney General sued, a compromise was reached, and the law was ultimately repealed.

At the end of her second term, Graham was one of two women on the Deseret News list of Utah's most powerful people.

== Later life and death ==
Graham died at her home in St. George, Utah, on January 29, 2024, at the age of 74. She had been diagnosed a decade earlier with primary peritoneal cancer.

== See also ==
- List of female state attorneys general in the United States

Legal offices
Preceded by Paul Van Dam	Attorney General of Utah; 1993–2001	Succeeded by Mark Shurtleff
