= Sean Reyes =

American lawyer & politician (born 1971)

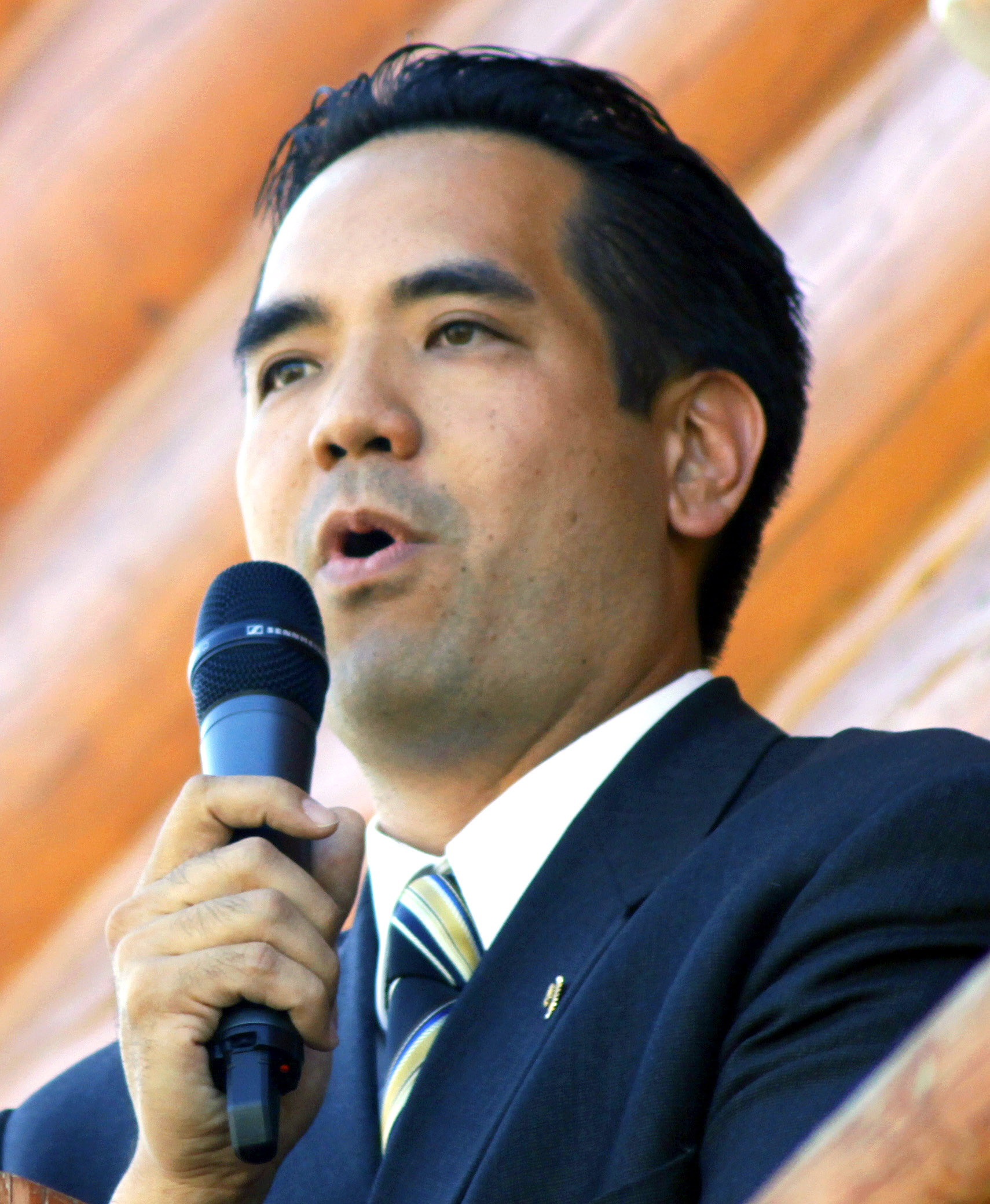

21st Attorney General of Utah
- In office December 30, 2013 – January 6, 2025
- Governor: Gary Herbert; Spencer Cox
- Preceded by: John Swallow
- Succeeded by: Derek Brown

Personal details
- Born: February 16, 1971 (age 55)
- Party: Republican
- Spouse: Saysha Fawson
- Children: 6
- Education: Brigham Young University (BA); University of California, Berkeley (JD)
- Website: Official website

Sean David Reyes (born February 16, 1971) is an American lawyer and politician who served as the Attorney General of Utah from 2013 to 2025. Appointed to the office by Governor Gary Herbert following the resignation of John Swallow, Reyes was reelected. Reyes is a member of the Republican Party and is a vocal and longtime supporter of Donald Trump. He has served as a county, state, and national delegate for the Republican Party and a member of the Utah Republican Party's State Central Committee.

== Early life and education ==
Reyes was raised in the Los Angeles area. His father was an immigrant from the Philippines. His mother was of half-Native Hawaiian and half-Japanese descent. He is a great-nephew of former Philippine President Ramon Magsaysay.

Reyes earned his bachelor's degree, summa cum laude, from Brigham Young University in 1994. He graduated from University of California, Berkeley, School of Law in 1997.

== Early career ==
Reyes spent 14 years working at Utah's largest law firm, Parsons Behle & Latimer, where he became the first person of color to become a partner. He practiced commercial litigation and employment law. He later became general counsel for eTAGz, a Springville, Utah-based media and technology company that aimed to develop products for embedding digital files on packaging. He was also a partner and co-founder of the venture capital firm Accelerate Ventures, a state small claims court judge, and president of the Minority Bar Association.

== Utah Attorney General ==
=== Elections ===
Reyes ran for state Attorney General in 2012 against Deputy state Attorney General John Swallow. He lost the primary election by a margin of 68 to 32 percent. After Swallow resigned amid scandal in December 2013, Reyes was selected by the Utah Republican Party State Central Committee as one of three candidates to fill the vacancy (on December 14, 2013), and Utah Governor Gary Herbert appointed Reyes to the position (on December 23, 2013).

Because of Utah's election laws, Reyes had to run in the 2014 Utah elections to be elected to finish out the remainder of Swallow's term. He won with 63.06 percent of the vote over his Democratic challenger, Charles A. Stormont, and Libertarian candidate Andrew McCullough.

In 2016, members of the Latter Day Church of Christ, a Mormon fundamentalist denomination, donated to Reyes' campaign for attorney general individually and through Washakie Renewable Energy, a business partially owned by members of the LDCC. Reyes' representatives indicated in response to these reports that the contributions had been placed in escrow.

In 2020, Reyes ran for a third term. He was challenged for the Republican nomination by Utah County Attorney David Leavitt, but won the Republican renomination in the July 2020 primary election with 54.04% of the vote. In the November 2020 general election, Reyes was reelected, defeating Democratic nominee Greg Skordas.

During the 2020 presidential election, Reyes was an elector. Unable to serve because of COVID-19 self-quarantine, Mia Love was nominated as a replacement elector.

=== Tenure ===
In 2015, Reyes joined Tim Ballard in a sting operation in Colombia of Ballard´s non-profit Operation Underground Railroad. During his time with Operation Underground Railroad, Reyes emerged as a global leader in the fight against human trafficking, leading daring undercover missions to rescue victims and spearheading prosecutions to dismantle trafficking networks.

As attorney general, Reyes frequently joined other Republican state attorneys general who sued the Obama administration on various issues, ranging from federal lands use to transgender rights.

Immediately after taking office, Reyes appealed U.S. District Judge Robert J. Shelby's ruling that struck down Amendment 3, the state's same-sex marriage ban. The estimated $2 million price tag in appealing Shelby's ruling was criticized by The Advocate, Daily Kos, and ThinkProgress. In response, Reyes stated, "We're willing to spend whatever it takes to protect the laws and the will of the people" and that "everyone benefits from appealing the case." The U.S. Court of Appeals for the Tenth Circuit upheld the district court's ruling; Reyes petitioned the U.S. Supreme Court for review, but the court denied his request to hear the case.

In 2020, after the New York Attorney General sued the National Rifle Association of America, asserting that Wayne LaPierre and other NRA officials unlawfully misappropriated NRA funds for personal expenses and self-enrichment, Reyes joined Arkansas Attorney General Leslie Rutledge in filing an amicus brief challenging the New York suit. Reyes asserted that the New York AG was discriminating against the NRA.

==== Trump support ====
Reyes is a vocal and longtime supporter of Donald Trump. In late-January 2017, Reyes was named as a top candidate for the chairmanship of the Federal Trade Commission by officials in the Trump administration. He praised Trump in a speech at the 2020 Republican National Convention, and Trump endorsed him in his 2020 primary. Reyes was also named Utah state co-chairman of Trump's reelection campaign. In September 2020, during the COVID-19 pandemic, Reyes appeared in the front row of an indoor Trump rally in Nevada, without social distancing from other attendees and without wearing a face mask, garnering criticism.

In November 2020, Reyes took several days leave to go to Nevada in a bid to bolster the Trump campaign's claims of purported voter fraud in neighboring Nevada. Reyes claimed that "voting irregularities" occurred but never provided any evidence for this claim. Nevada Attorney General Aaron Ford noted that there was no evidence of voter fraud in the 2020 Nevada elections, stated that Reyes had not returned his telephone calls or text messages, and termed his conduct "disrespectful" to Nevada. A number of Utah officials, as well as the United Utah Party, criticized Reyes for baselessly undermining faith in the democratic process without evidence.

In December 2020, Reyes joined a group of 16 other Republican state attorneys general in a failed lawsuit to overturn the results of the 2020 presidential election. His participation in the suit was criticized by the outgoing Utah Governor, Gary Herbert, and his successor, Lieutenant Governor and Governor-elect Spencer Cox. Utahns created a petition calling for Reyes's recall. The suit, which attempted to invoke the U.S. Supreme Court's original jurisdiction, was brought by Texas Attorney General Ken Paxton, against Georgia, Michigan, Wisconsin, and Pennsylvania, four swing states in which Joe Biden defeated Trump. The suit repeated claims made by Trump and his allies - which had already been rejected in other state and federal courts - that the election was marred by widespread voter fraud. Paxton asked the Supreme Court to invalidate the states' 62 electoral votes, allowing Trump to be declared the winner. Legal experts stated that the suit was meritless. Election law expert Rick Hasen described the lawsuit as "the dumbest case I've ever seen filed on an emergency basis at the Supreme Court." Nebraska Republican Senator Ben Sasse said the situation of Paxton initiating the lawsuit "looks like a fella begging for a pardon filed a PR stunt"; at the time he brought the suit, Paxton was facing a federal securities fraud charge and allegations of abuse of office allegations). On December 11, the U.S. Supreme Court quickly rejected the suit which Reyes had joined, in an unsigned opinion.

== Personal life ==
Reyes and his wife Saysha have six children.

A member of the Church of Jesus Christ of Latter-day Saints (LDS Church), Reyes was a bishop in Salt Lake City for five years in his early career.

== Television ==
Reyes appeared as himself in three episodes of A&E network's The Secret of Skinwalker Ranch. His first appearance was in 2020's S1.E8 "Revelations." Reyes later appears twice in 2023: S4.E4 "The Watchers"and S4.E12 "In and Out,"

== Controversy ==
On November 14, 2023, the Utah legislature authorized a formal audit of Reyes. A bipartisan group of legislators stated they were concerned with Reyes' relationship with Tim Ballard and Operation Underground Railroad. The letter directly asked the audit committee to investigate four different areas, including Reyes' travel practices and procedures, the culture of the Attorney General's office, the government of the office, and if Reyes' involvement with Operation Underground Railroad impaired his judgment or misused state resources. This audit request came shortly after a separate lawsuit claimed Reyes intimidated witnesses related to an OUR investigation.

On November 27, 2023, a lawsuit was filed by Suzanne Whitehead where she accused Reyes of witness tampering. In the lawsuit, she accused Reyes of using his authority to "unconstitutionally suppress" free speech, but on December 19, 2023, she voluntarily dismissed all claims against Reyes, and he was removed from the case at that point and never added back. The lawsuit also mentioned Reyes was a ghostwriter for a potential sequel to Sounds of Freedom. Reyes wrote himself into the show, where he called himself one of the Republican Party's top four rising stars and potential White House material. Concerns included Reyes' potential conflict of interest. At one time, Reyes' job title on LinkedIn was updated to "Associate Producer, Sound of Freedom,' then reverted to "Utah Attorney General."

In November 2023, the Utah Attorney's General's office confirmed that Reyes knew Operation Underground Railroad (OUR) used donations to retain a psychic, Janet Russon, to find missing and/or dead children. His office issued a statement that Utah law enforcement does not engage psychics but that they "sometimes provide useful information."

In 2023, Utah media outlets KSL TV and the Salt Lake Tribune sued for access to Reyes' official calendar. The Utah State Records Committee ruled the calendar must be released, but Reyes argued that release of private work and personal information would present a security risk. The lawsuit was fully resolved in November 2024, when the office released 9,165 pages of calendar invitations sent to or from Reyes’ official Microsoft Outlook account, covering January 2019 through December 2023. The records include meetings of various official and semi-official events.

== See also ==
- Asian Americans in politics
- Hispanic Americans in politics
- Politics of Utah

== Electoral history ==
Utah Attorney General Republican Primary Election, 2012
Party	Candidate	Votes	%
Republican	John Swallow	156,644	67.95
Republican	Sean Reyes	73,868	32.05

Utah Attorney General Election, 2014
Party	Candidate	Votes	%
Republican	Sean Reyes (inc.)	355,275	63.06
Democratic	Charles Stormont	151,967	26.97
Libertarian	Andrew McCullough	22,333	3.96
Constitution	Gregory Hansen	18,722	3.32
Independent American	Leslie Curtis	15,108	2.68

Utah Attorney General Election, 2016
Party	Candidate	Votes	%
Republican	Sean D. Reyes (inc.)	719,043	65.41
Democratic	John V. Harper	275,568	25.07
Libertarian	W. Andrew McCullough	73,973	6.73
Independent American	Michael W. Isbell	30,687	2.79

== See also ==
- List of minority attorneys general in the United States

Legal offices
Preceded by John Swallow	Attorney General of Utah; 2013–2025	Succeeded by Derek Brown
