= Mark Shurtleff =

American lawyer

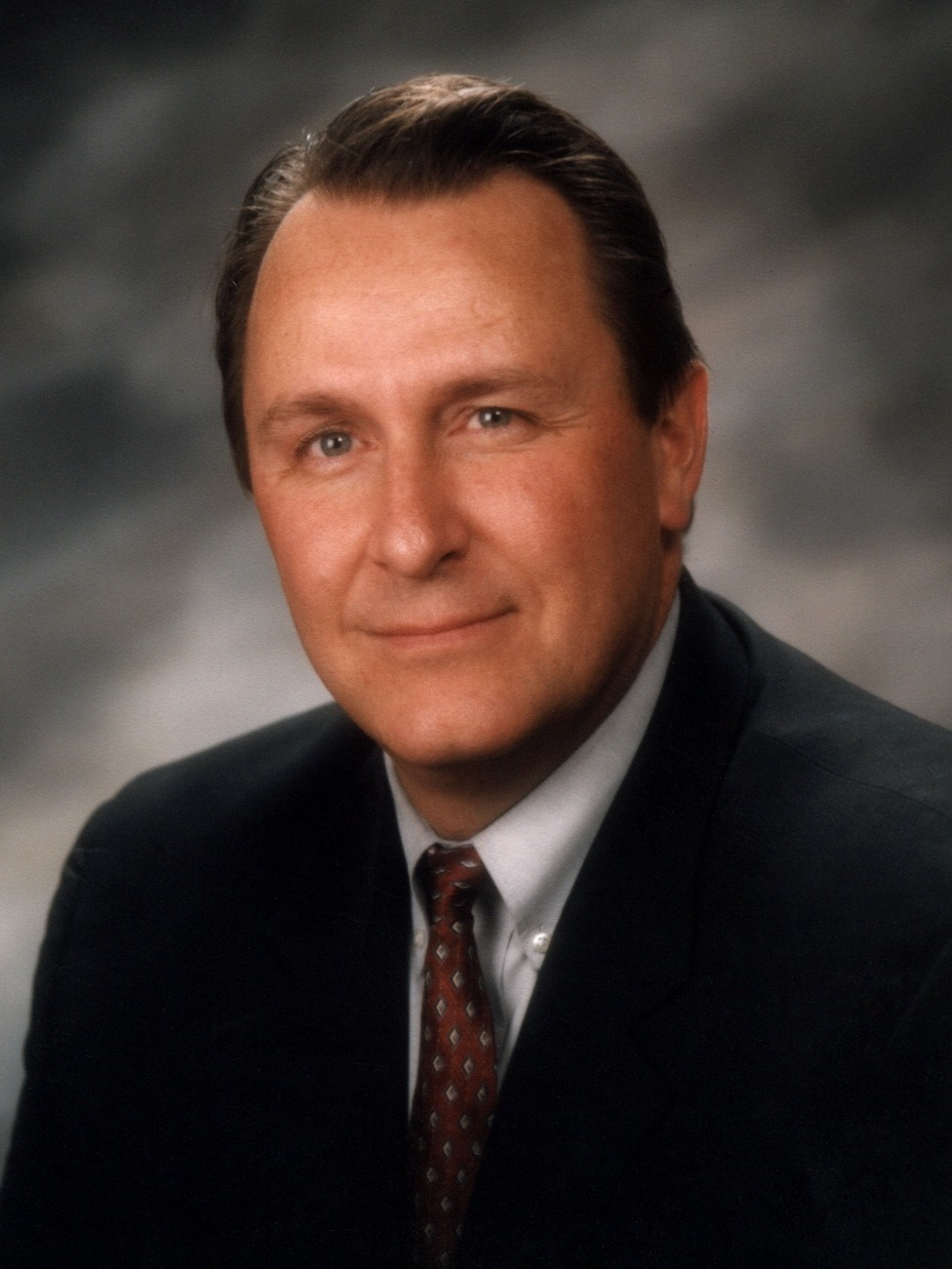

19th Attorney General of Utah
- In office January 2001 – January 2013
- Governor: Mike Leavitt; Olene Walker; Jon Huntsman; Gary Herbert
- Preceded by: Jan Graham
- Succeeded by: John Swallow

Member of the Salt Lake County Commission
- In office January 1999 – January 2001

Personal details
- Born: Mark Leonard Shurtleff; August 9, 1957 (age 68) Salt Lake City, Utah, U.S.
- Party: Republican
- Children: 5
- Education: Brigham Young University (BS); University of Utah (JD)

Military service
- Branch/service: United States Navy
- Years of service: 1985-1990
- Rank: Commander
- Unit: J.A.G. Corps

Mark Leonard Shurtleff (born August 9, 1957) is an American attorney, former three-term Utah Attorney General, and founder of the Shurtleff Law Firm and the Shurtleff Group. He was a partner in the Washington, D.C. office of the law firm Troutman Sanders and served as a Salt Lake County Commissioner prior to being elected as Attorney General of the state of Utah.

== Education and early career ==
Shurtleff attended Brighton High School (Cottonwood Heights, Utah), Brigham Young University, University of Utah College of Law, and University of San Diego School of Law. Shurtleff served as a missionary for the Church of Jesus Christ of Latter-day Saints in Peru. He served four years in the United States Navy as a Judge Advocate General Corps (JAG).

== Career ==
Shurtleff was the Deputy County Attorney and a Commissioner of Salt Lake County and later became an Assistant Attorney General for the state of Utah. Shurtleff was elected Attorney General in November 2000, and re-elected in 2004 and 2008. He is the first Attorney General in Utah to win re-election for a third term.

As Attorney General, Shurtleff issued an official legal opinion stating that under a second law (HB174), private school vouchers would still be funded even if voters rejected the primary voucher bill (HB 148) in a November referendum.

In May 2007, Shurtleff testified before the United States Senate Judiciary Committee as a Republican in support of the Constitutionality of granting full representation in Congress for residents of Washington DC. That year Shurtleff co-founded the Utah Meth Cops Project and raised money to provide detoxification treatment to police officers.

On May 12, 2009, Shurtleff disclosed, via a Twitter message, that he planned to enter the 2010 Republican primary. On November 4, 2009, Shurtleff ended his campaign for U.S. Senate in order to spend more time with his daughter, who was experiencing health problems. That year, he co-founded the Utah Pharmaceutical Drug Crime Project, an unprecedented multi-agency, multi-disciplinary task force to combat the serious problem of prescription drug abuse. Partners included the DEA, FBI, Utah Departments of Public Safety and Human Services, and the Salt Lake City Police Department.

In September 2010, Shurtleff testified before the House Judiciary Committee in support of the Comprehensive Alcohol Regulatory Effectiveness Act, an act that seeks to reverse the effects of Granholm v. Heald, a 2005 U.S. Supreme Court case that ruled unconstitutional state laws that permitted in-state wineries to ship wine directly to consumers, but prohibited out-of-state wineries from doing the same. Shurtleff's remarks were drafted by the general counsel of the National Beer Wholesalers Association.

In April 2013, Shurtleff testified before the United States Senate Judiciary Committee in support of comprehensive immigration reform during the Hearing on the Border Security, Economic Opportunity and Immigration Modernization Act, S.744.

In February 2013, Shurtleff spoke on Capitol Hill in Washington DC on "The Role of State Attorneys General in Enforcing Federal Law" to Congressional staffers at the Civil Justice Caucus Academy run by George Mason University School of Law

In July 2015, Mark Shurtleff, with his brother Kevin Shurtleff, started a business called MicromistNOW. The company's first product is the QuickNic Nicotine Inhaler. While attorney general Shurtleff made multiple public statements critical of the tobacco industry.

== Election history ==
Utah Attorney General Election, 2000
Party	Candidate	Votes	%	±%
Republican	Mark Shurtleff	435,988	57	
Democratic	Reed Richards	299,683	40	

Utah Attorney General Election, 2004
Party	Candidate	Votes	%	±%
Republican	Mark Shurtleff	614,742	68.4	+11.4
Democratic	Gregory Skordas	255,779	28.4	

Utah Attorney General Election, 2008
Party	Candidate	Votes	%	±%
Republican	Mark Shurtleff	650,147	69.3	+0.9
Democratic	Jean Welch	249,492	26.6	

== Personal life ==
Shurtleff is divorced with five children and eight grandchildren. He is an Eagle Scout and is fluent in Spanish. Shurtleff was honored by the Boys and Girls Clubs with their 2012 Living Legacy Award. Shurtleff was divorced on November 6, 2019

== Allegations of criminal misconduct ==
In 2008 several articles from local news sources accused Shurtleff of corruption and bribery regarding his prosecutorial decisions. These allegations were investigated by the FBI but the United States Department of Justice took no action.

In 2014 Salt Lake County District Attorney Sim Gill filed 10 felony charges against Shurtleff. Davis County District Attorney Troy Rawlings took over the Shurtleff prosecution when Shurtleff's criminal case was severed from the case of former Attorney General John Swallow.

In July 2016 the state criminal charges against Shurtleff were dismissed on a motion by the state.

Legal offices
Preceded by Jan Graham	Attorney General of Utah; 2001–2013	Succeeded by John Swallow
