= John Swallow =

American politician (born 1962)

20th Attorney General of Utah
- In office January 7, 2013 – December 3, 2013
- Governor: Gary Herbert
- Preceded by: Mark Shurtleff
- Succeeded by: Sean Reyes

Member of the Utah House of Representatives from the 51st district
- In office January 1997 – January 2003
- Preceded by: Shirley V. Jensen
- Succeeded by: Greg Hughes

Personal details
- Born: November 10, 1962 (age 63) San Gabriel, California, U.S.
- Party: Republican
- Spouse: Suzanne Seader
- Children: 5
- Education: Brigham Young University (BA, JD)
- Website: Official website

John Swallow (born November 10, 1962) is an American lawyer and politician who served as Attorney General of Utah. Just prior to serving as attorney general, he served as Chief Deputy Attorney General overseeing all civil litigation for the state of Utah.

Swallow has been a lawyer since 1990 and was a member of the Utah State House of Representatives from 1996 to 2002. In December 2009, John Swallow was appointed Chief Deputy Attorney General for Utah. While serving as Chief Deputy, some of his most prominent projects included the fights to overturn the Patient Protection and Affordable Care Act and to gain state control of Utah's federally controlled lands. In November 2012, Swallow easily won the election for Utah Attorney General by a 64 to 30 percent margin.

In November 2013, following federal and state investigations into alleged improprieties, Swallow resigned, after less than a year in office, while proclaiming his innocence and denying all wrongdoing. Swallow and his predecessor, Mark Shurtleff, were arrested in July 2014 on corruption charges. In March 2017, a jury acquitted Swallow of all charges. Thereafter, following an extensive review of all evidence in all investigations and according to a letter dated July 16, 2017, the Utah State Bar absolved John Swallow of any ethical violations. In September 2019, the Utah State Legislature, by nearly-unanimous votes, approved a $1.5 million damages payment, reimbursing Swallow for his legal fees. Thereafter a licensed private investigator asserted publicly that all investigations of John Swallow's conduct had been orchestrated by politicians who benefitted from the false allegations.

== Early life ==
John Swallow was born in San Gabriel, California and moved to St. George, Utah when he was five years old. Four years later, his father left the family and later the family was informed that he had died. When his father left, the family moved to live with his maternal grandparents in Juneau, Alaska for three years. When John was 13, his mother married Richard Swallow, and John and his siblings were adopted into the Swallow family when John was 16. Richard Swallow was a farmer in Spring Valley, Nevada, in an area of what is now Great Basin National Park. John and his brothers worked on the alfalfa farm in the summers and attended White Pine High School.

Swallow served a Spanish-speaking mission for the Church of Jesus Christ of Latter-day Saints in Los Angeles, California. Before July 2012, he had also served as a Bishop in the Church. He earned an undergraduate degree in Psychology and then a J.D. degree from Brigham Young University J. Reuben Clark Law School, where he was a member of the Law Review. In 1985, Swallow married Suzanne Seader; after his graduation they moved to Sandy, a suburb of Salt Lake City. They have five children.

== Politics ==
In 1996, after working as a law firm partner for several years, Swallow successfully ran for the Utah House of Representatives for a district based in Sandy and continued serving as a State Representative for six consecutive years. While in the legislature, Swallow was named one of the most effective lawmakers by the Deseret News and sponsored the then-largest tax cut in Utah's history and was named Taxpayer Advocate of the Year by the Utah Taxpayers Association for sponsoring and passing legislation to reduce taxes in Utah.

Swallow gave up his state house seat in 2002 to run for Utah's 2nd congressional district against freshman Democrat Jim Matheson. The district had been located entirely within Salt Lake County, but redistricting after the 2000 census pushed it into a large swath of rural territory in southern Utah, where Swallow had lived as a boy. The national party spent very little money on Swallow's behalf, but “in spite of little assistance from outside groups and parties and with serious financial constraints, Swallow was able to wage a very competitive campaign.” Ultimately, Swallow lost to Matheson by a margin of only 1,600 votes, largely because he could not overcome a 25,800-vote deficit in Salt Lake County.

In 2009, Swallow was appointed as the Chief Deputy Attorney General of Utah over seven civil divisions. A major focus was the state lawsuit to overturn U.S. President Obama's healthcare law. Swallow also sued Barack Obama and Interior Secretary Ken Salazar to unlock federal land within Utah for oil and gas exploration, and to help fund education for Utah children.

Swallow announced his candidacy for Attorney General in January 2012. During his race, he was endorsed by his predecessor, Attorney General Mark Shurtleff and U.S. Senator Mike Lee. Swallow was also endorsed in his candidacy by the NRA and received an "A+" rating from the 2nd Amendment organization, because of "his dedication to gun owners," and "his defense of the second amendment." Swallow was elected and sworn on January 7, 2013.

== Investigations ==
=== Federal Investigation ===
In January 2013, the United States Department of Justice and FBI investigated Swallow's role in an alleged scheme to help indicted businessman Jeremy Johnson avoid a lawsuit by the FTC. According to Johnson, who was indicted for mail-fraud charges related to his internet business iWorks, Swallow attempted to broker a deal to bribe Senate Majority Leader Harry Reid with $600,000 through lobbyist Richard Rawle.

In May 2013, Marc Sessions Jenson (who was convicted in 2008 of defrauding millions from investors) turned receipts over to the FBI, claiming to show that in 2009 he gave Swallow free meals, massages, golf outings and rooms at a gated Newport Beach villa. At the time, Swallow was a private lawyer and not a public official; thus, there was no improper receipt of benefits.

In September 2013, the United States Department of Justice closed its investigation and gave notice that they would not file charges.

=== Utah State Bar Investigation ===
In May 2013, former Utah State Consumer protection director Traci Gunderson filed a complaint with the Utah State Bar, alleging improperly discussed settlement negotiations with a company under investigation by the Utah State Division of Consumer Protection. Swallow's office stated: "John Swallow did not violate any bar rules, and the complaint confuses the rules between a private law firm and a public law firm. The attorney general can and should hear complaints from the public. However, no meeting actually took place and no settlement offers were made or accepted" The Utah State Bar dismissed the complaint as non-meritorious in December, 2013, and during the investigation of the complaint, Gunderson admitted under oath that she had colluded with a member of the Governor's cabinet to secretly file the complaint so the cabinet member would have "plausible deniability."

=== Lieutenant Governor's Investigation ===
In May 2013, Lieutenant Governor Gregory S. Bell announced he would appoint a special counsel to investigate potential violations of campaign laws.

=== Utah State House Investigation ===
On July 3, 2013, H.R. 9001 was passed by the Utah State House of Representatives, which formed a committee to investigate allegations of misconduct against Swallow. Swallow previously stated the investigative committee was the state legislature's choice and that he "completely respect[s] their prerogative."

On August 7, 2013, the Utah House special investigative committee held its first meeting. Chairman Rep. Jim Dunnigan expected the investigation to take months.

=== Resignation ===
On November 21, 2013, Swallow announced his resignation from office. Swallow resigned to clear his name as a private citizen without the distractions of being a public figure in office. He also cited the personal and financial strains involved in the investigations. The Deseret News, a Salt Lake City daily newspaper, reported that he "cut a deal" with the Utah lieutenant governor's office to avoid criminal charges and the release of a report charging Swallow with violating state law.

=== Utah State House Completes Investigation ===
On March 11, 2014, the investigative committee commissioned by the Utah State House of Representatives completed their investigation and published their report. The committee concluded that Swallow had engaged in unethical and potentially illegal behavior, including the disappearance of substantial electronic evidence under suspicious circumstances. Swallow and his counsel were alleged to have repeatedly stymied investigators with false statements and fabricated documents.

=== Arrest ===
On July 15, 2014, the FBI arrested Swallow, along with former Attorney General Mark Shurtleff just after 8 a.m. at their homes and charged him with receiving or soliciting bribe or bribery by a public servant, false or inconsistent material statements, evidence tampering and misusing public monies. They were both released hours later at 11:45 a.m. The arrest came after a search warrant was executed on the Swallow residence in June 2014.

== Outcome ==
On December 6, 2013, the Utah State Bar dismissed an ethics complaint filed at the request of a Gary Herbert cabinet member saying: “the evidence you provided is insufficient to establish. . . that Mr. Swallow engaged in conduct that violated the Rules of Professional Conduct.” On March 2, 2017, more than three years after he stepped away from office, a jury of eight unanimously acquitted him on all charges. Two jurors who spoke to reporters said prosecutors just didn't have the evidence to convict. “Without a doubt…the evidence just wasn’t there to support the allegations” said one juror.

On June 16, 2017, after a full review of all of the investigative reports, including the House Report, the Governor's Report, and all trial evidence related to all allegations, the Utah State Bar's Office of Professional Conduct cleared Swallow on all matters related to professional ethics.

A year later, a federal district judge dismissed a federal lawsuit that had been filed by the Federal Elections Commission alleging missteps relative to campaign finance issues. “I did not do what they said I did,” Swallow is reported to have said. He added: "This is the end of the state and federal government's actions against me. In every single instance I have been found innocent," he said. "I have been absolutely now vindicated and I am moving forward with my life."

in September, 2019, the Utah legislature nearly unanimously approved a payment of $1.5 million in damages owed to Swallow for the wrongful prosecution by the State, which Swallow described as an exclamation point on his innocence.

Swallow is now practicing law and writing a book on government investigative abuses.

== Public lands ==
He advocates a position arguing that federal control over land in Utah keeps the state government from having access to Utah's resources and that this subsequently prevents economic growth and impinges on what he sees as constitutional rights. Swallow credits his upbringing on a farm with giving him an appreciation for the land and its worth.

While serving as Chief Deputy Attorney General, Swallow doubled the size of the Public Lands litigation team. The office also filed suit over the Wild Lands Policy, filed notices of intent to litigate against the government over more than 12,000 RS-2477 roads, and worked to keep the Sage Grouse from being listed as an endangered species. Swallow alleges that expansive federal policies that cut off access to public lands are killing jobs, hurting Utah's economy and robbing children's classrooms of greatly needed funding.

Utah House of Representatives
Preceded by Shirley V. Jensen	Member of the Utah House of Representatives from the 51st district 1997–2003	Succeeded by Greg Hughes
Legal offices
Preceded by Mark Shurtleff	Attorney General of Utah; 2013	Succeeded by Sean Reyes
