= 1996 Utah Attorney General election =

- November 5, 1996
	DEM	GOP
Nominee	Jan Graham	Scott Burns
Party	Democratic	Republican
Popular vote	351,523	308,698
Percentage	52.41%	46.03%
- County results Graham: 50–60% 60–70% 70–80% Burns: 50–60% 60–70% 70–80%
Attorney General before election
Jan Graham
Democratic
Elected Attorney General
Jan Graham
Democratic

The 1996 Utah Attorney General election was held on November 5, 1996. Incumbent Democratic Attorney General Jan Graham was re-elected to a second term in office, defeating Iron County Attorney Scott Burns in a rematch of the 1992 race. As of 2026, this is the last time a Democrat won a statewide election in Utah. This is also the longest drought nationally for the Democratic Party winning in a statewide race.

== General election ==
=== Candidates ===
- Scott Burns, Iron County Attorney (Republican)
- Jan Graham, incumbent Attorney General of Utah since 1993 (Democratic)
- W. Andrew McCullough (Independent & Libertarian)

=== Results ===
1996 Utah Attorney General election
Party	Candidate	Votes	%	±%
Democratic	Jan Graham (incumbent)	351,523	52.41%	+3.24
Republican	Scott Burns	308,698	46.03%	−2.41
Independent	W. Andrew McCullough	6,910	1.03%	N/A
Libertarian	W. Andrew McCullough	3,536	0.53%	−1.86%
Total	W. Andrew McCullough	10,436	1.56%	N/A
Total votes		670,667	100.00%	N/A
Democratic hold				

== See also ==
- 1996 Utah gubernatorial election
