= 2006 Washington State local elections =

The following local races were on the ballot in Washington State during the 2006 election. The filing period for candidates for public office was July 24 through July 28, 2006. Washington State's primary election was held on September 19, 2006.

== County & Local Elections ==
=== Adams County ===
County Commissioner District 3

- Jeffrey W. Stevens (R)

County Assessor

- David Anderson (R)

County Auditor

- Nancy McBroom (R)

County Clerk

- Paulette Gibler (R)

Othello District Court Judge

- Gary Brueher (NP)

County Prosecutor

- Randy Flyckt (R)

County Sheriff

- Douglas Barger (R)

County Treasurer

- Laura Danekas (R)

=== Asotin County ===
==== City Council ====
City of Asotin

City of Asotin Council Pos 3

- Vickie Bonfield (NP)

City of Asotin Council Pos 4

- Marvin A. Schneider (NP)

City of Asotin Council Pos 5

- Del Schnider (NP)

City of Clarkston

City of Clarkston Council Pos 1

- Dave Richards (NP)

City of Clarkston Council Pos 2

- John Smith (NP)

City of Clarkston Council Pos 3

- Larry Baumberger (NP)

City of Clarkston Council Pos 4

- Terry Beadles (NP)

City of Clarkston Council Pos 5

- Kathy Renggli (NP)

==== Fire Districts ====
Asotin County Fire Protection District No. 1

Fire Protection District No. 1 Comm Pos 2

- Patrick Loseth (NP)

==== Port Districts ====
Port of Clarkston

Port Commissioner Dist 1

- Don Hillis (NP)

==== School districts ====
Clarkston School District No. 250-185

Clarkston School Dist Director Dist 2

- Nancy Randall (NP)

Clarkston School Dist Director Dist 3

- Lloyd Wallis (NP)

Clarkston School Dist Director Dist 4

- Judy Rooney (NP)

Clarkston School Dist Director Dist 5

- Dennis Lentz (NP)

Asotin-Anatone School District No. 420

Asotin-Anatone School Director Dist 2

- Chris Loseth (NP)

Asotin-Anatone School Director Dist 3

- Lorine Utmor (NP)

Asotin-Anatone School Director Dist 4

- Kenneth Weiss (NP)

=== Benton County ===
Benton County Assessor

- Carolyn Kathleen Joyce (R)
- Barbara Wagner (R)

Benton County Auditor

- Bobbie Gagner (R)

Benton County Clerk

- Byron Pugh (R)
- Josie Delvin (R)

Benton County Coroner

- John Hansens (R)
- Rick Corson (R)
- Kimberly Kennedy (D)
- Mark A. Cope (D)

Benton County Prosecuting Attorney

- Andy Miller (D)

Benton County Sheriff

- Larry D. Taylor (R)

Benton County Treasurer

- Duane A. Davidson (R)

=== Chelan County ===
Chelan County Commissioners

District 2

- Keith Goehner (R)

Public Utility District Commissioners

District 2

- Bob Boyd

District B At-Large

- Gary Montague

Chelan County Assessor

- Russ Griffith

Chelan County Auditor

- Evely L. Arnold

Chelan County Clerk

- Siri Woods

Chelan County Coroner

- Wayne Harris

Chelan County Pros. Attorney

- Gary Riesen

Chelan County Sheriff

- Mike Harum

Chelan County Treasurer

- David E. Griffiths

District Court Judge A

- Alicia Nakata

District Court Judge B

- Nancy Harmon

=== Clallam County ===
- Assessor
- Auditor
- Treasurer
- Pros. Atty
- Sheriff
- Director of DCD
- Dist. Court 1 Judge
- Dist. Court 2 Judge
- County Commissioner Dist. 3
  - Mike Doherty (D) - Incumbent
- PUD Commissioner Dist. 3
- 5 Charter Review Commissioners from each Commissioner Dist.

=== Cowlitz County ===
County Assessor

- Terry McLaughlin (D) - Incumbent

County Auditor

- Kristina K. Swanson (D) - Incumbent

County Clerk

- Roni A. Booth (D) - Incumbent

County Commissioner District 3

- Jeff Rasmussen (R) - Incumbent
- Axel Swanson (D) (GENERAL ELECTION WINNER)
- The following candidates for County Commissioner lost the primary.
  - Ken Spring (R)
  - Chuck Wallace (D)
  - Elizabeth (Beth) J. Webb (D)

County Coroner

- Timothy J. Davidson (D) - Incumbent

County Prosecuting Attorney

- Sue Baur (D) - Incumbent

County Sheriff

- Bill Mahoney (D) - Incumbent

County Treasurer

- Judy 'Lyons' Ainslie (R) - Incumbent

Cowlitz County District Court

- Judge Position 1
  - David R. Koss (NP) - Incumbent
- Judge Position 2
  - Edward J. Putka (NP) - Incumbent

Cowlitz Public Utility District

- Commissioner District 2
  - Mark McCrady (NP) (GENERAL ELECTION WINNER)
  - John Searing (NP) - (Incumbent) (Searing was a primary winner but withdrew from the race on October 2. His name was on the general election ballot. Had John Searing received the most votes, Searing would have declined another six years as PUD Commissioner, and a person other than Mark McCrady would have been appointed.)
  - Howard Meharg (NP) (lost primary)

=== Island County ===
Place data here please

=== King County ===
- King County Prosecutor Norm Maleng, R
- Seattle City Council, Seat 9 - Sally Clark, NP

=== Kitsap County ===
County Commissioner District 3

- Patricia Lent (R)

County Assessor

- Jim Avery (R)

County Auditor

- Karen Flynn (D)

County Clerk

- Dave Peterson (D)

County Coroner

- Greg Sandstrom (R)

County Prosecuting Attorney

- Russ Hauge (D)

County Sheriff

- Steve Boyer (D)

County Treasurer

- Barbara Stephenson (D)

District Court Judge Department 1

- James Riehl (NP)

District Court Judge Department 2

- W. Daniel Phillips (NP)

District Court Judge Department 3

- Marilyn Paja (NP)

=== Kittitas County ===
County Assessor

- Iris Rominger

County Auditor

- Jerald Pettit

County Clerk

- Joyce Julsrud

County Commissioner District 3

- Perry Huston (R) - Incumbent, running for Sheriff in '06
- Fennelle Miller (D)
  - Website: https://web.archive.org/web/20130612143757/http://miller4kittitas.com/
- Dale Hubbard (D)
- Mark McClain (R)

District Court Judge

- Lower County
  - Tom Haven
- Upper County
  - Darrel Ellis

County Prosecuting Attorney

- Greg Zempel

County Sheriff

- Gene Dana
- Perry Huston (R)

County Treasurer

- Amy Mills

Public Utility District Position 2

- John Hanson

=== Lewis County ===
County Assessor

- Dianne Dorey (R)

County Auditor

- Gary E. Zandell (R)

County Clerk

- A. Kathy Brack (R)

County Commissioner District 3

- Dennis Hadaller (R)

County Coroner

- Terry L. Wilson (R)

County Prosecutor

- Jeremy Randolph (R)

County Sheriff

- Steve Mansfield (R) (appointed 1/26/05)

County Treasurer

- Rose Bowman (R)

District Court Dept #1

- Michael P. Roewe (NP)

District Court Dept #2

- R.W. Buzzard (NP)

=== Mason County ===
Mason County Commissioner District 3

- Jayni Kamin (R)

Mason County Assessor

- Dixie Smith (D)

Mason County Auditor

- Al Brotche (D)

Mason County Clerk

- Pat Swartos (D)

Mason County Coroner

- Wes Stockwell (D)

Mason County Prosecutor

- Gary Burleson (R)

Mason County Sheriff

- Steve Whybark (D)

Mason County Treasurer

- Elisabeth (Lisa) Frazier (D)

Mason County PUD No. 1

- Johnny "Jack" Janda

Mason County PUD No. 3

- Bruce E. Jorgenson

=== Okanogan County ===
Okanogan County Commissioner District #3

- Mary Lou Peterson

Okanogan County Auditor

- Peggy Robbins

Okanogan County Assessor

- Scott D. Furman

Okanogan County Treasurer

- Delmer L. Shove

Okanogan County Clerk

- Jackie Bradley http://www.wenatcheeworld.com/news/2012/apr/16/longtime-okanogan-clerk-killed-in-wreck/

Okanogan County Prosecuting Attorney

- Kark F. Sloan

Okanogan County Sheriff

- Frank Rogers

Okanogan County District Judge Position 1

- Chris Culp

Okanogan County District Judge Position 2

- Dave Edwards

=== Pierce County ===
Pierce County Auditor

- Pat McCarthy (D)

Pierce County Prosecuting Attorney

- Gerald Horne (D)

Pierce County Council District 1

- Shawn Bunney (R)

Pierce County Council District 5

- Barbra Gelman (D)

Pierce County Council District 7

- Terry Lee (R)

=== San Juan County ===
San Juan County Commissioner District 6

- Robert O. Myhr

San Juan County Assessor

- Paul G. Dossett (R)

San Juan County Auditor

- Si A. Stephens (R)

San Juan County Clerk

- Mary Jean Cahail (D)

San Juan County District Court Judge

- Stewart Andrew (NP)

San Juan County Prosecuting Attorney

- Randall K. Gaylord (D)

San Juan County Sheriff

- Bill Cumming (D)

San Juan County Treasurer

- Kathy Turnbull (R)

=== Skagit County ===
There may be a November 2006 special ballot by the Skagit County Commissioners to adopt a fluoridation ordinance that would allow and require the Skagit Public Utility District #1 to adjust the natural level of fluoride in its water supply so that a greater number of Skagit County residents can receive the proven benefits of fluoride, and thereby oral disease may be reduced. For more information read: Citizens for a Healthy Skagit or Skagit County Clean Water

Skagit County Commissioner District 3

- Ted W. Anderson (R)
- Sharon Dillon (D)

Website: Sharon Dillon

Skagit County Assessor

- Mark Leander (R)

Skagit County Auditor

- Norma Brummett (R)

Skagit County Clerk

- Nancy Scott (D)

Skagit County Coroner

- Bruce Bacon (D)

Skagit County Prosecutor

- Tom Seguine (R)
- Jennifer Bouwens (R)
  - Website: http://www.electjenbouwens.com

Skagit County Sheriff

- Rick Grimstead (D)

Skagit County Treasurer

- Katie Jungquist

Skagit County District Court Judge Position 1

- Stephen Skelton (NP)

Skagit County District Court Judge Position 2

- David Svaren (NP)

Skagit County Public Utility District Commissioner District 2

- Robbie Robertson (NP)

=== Spokane County ===
(See also Spokane County Auditor's candidate filing page and primary results page)

Spokane County Commissioner District 3

- Phil Harris (R) - Incumbent (PRIMARY WINNER)
- Bonnie Mager (D) (PRIMARY WINNER) (GENERAL ELECTION WINNER)
  - Bonnie has been executive director of Citizens for Clean Air, the Eastern Washington Coordinator for Washington Environmental Council and Director of Neighborhood Alliance of Spokane County.
  - Website: https://web.archive.org/web/20060813220156/http://www.votebonniemager.com/
- George Orr (D)
  - Former Washington State Representative, U.S. Navy Veteran, Career Firefighter, former PTA President, school district Boardmember
  - Website: https://web.archive.org/web/20060814144827/http://www.votegeorgeorr.com/
  - Additional Info: https://web.archive.org/web/20060513182355/http://www.spokanedemocrats.org/index.cfm?page=hopefuls.cfm
- Barbara "Barb" K. Chamberlain (D)
  - Director of Communications & Public Affairs at Washington State University Spokane since 1998; Friends of the Falls Board of Directors; University District Development Steering Committee; Co-chair, Citizens for Spokane Schools, 2006 successful levy campaign; former Idaho State Legislator, former Chair North Idaho College Board of Trustees
  - Website: https://web.archive.org/web/20110202175619/http://votebarbchamberlain.com/
- Larry R. Vandervert (R)

Spokane County Auditor

- Vicky M. Dalton (D) - Incumbent (GENERAL ELECTION WINNER)
- Mike Volz (R)
  - Website: https://web.archive.org/web/20071010130036/http://votevolz.com/

Spokane County Assessor (As of the evening of November 9, Baker led by less than 200 votes)

- Ralph Baker (R) - Incumbent (PRIMARY WINNER)
- Judy Personett (D) (PRIMARY WINNER)
  - Website: http://www.electpersonettassessor.com
- Brad Stark (R)
  - Currently a Spokane City Council member

Spokane County Clerk

- Thomas R. Fallquist (R) - Incumbent

Spokane County Prosecuting Attorney

- Steve Tucker (R) - Incumbent (PRIMARY WINNER) (GENERAL ELECTION WINNER)
- Bob Caruso (D) (PRIMARY WINNER)
- Jim Reierson (D)

Spokane County Sheriff

- Ozzie D. Knezovich (R) - Incumbent (appointed) (PRIMARY WINNER) (GENERAL ELECTION WINNER)
  - Website: http://www.ozzieforsheriff.com/
- James Flavel (D) (PRIMARY WINNER)
- Cal Walker (R)
  - Website: http://www.calwalkerforsheriff.com/

Spokane County Treasurer

- Bob Wrigley (R)
- D. E. "Skip" Chilberg (D) (GENERAL ELECTION WINNER)

Spokane County District Court Position 1

- Vance W. Peterson - Incumbent

Spokane County District Court Position 2

- Sara B. Derr - Incumbent (PRIMARY WINNER—with more than 50% of the vote, Derr will advance to the general election alone)
  - Website: http://www.reelectsaraderr.com/
- Dan Davis
- F. Dana Kelley.

Spokane County District Court Position 3

- John O. Cooney (GENERAL ELECTION WINNER)
  - Website: https://web.archive.org/web/20080821075610/http://www.cooney4judge.com/
- Mark A. Laiminger
  - Senior Deputy Prosecutor, Spokane County
  - Website: https://web.archive.org/web/20071009043919/http://www.marklaiminger.org/

Spokane County District Court Position 4

- Patti Connolly Walker - IncumbentSpokane County District Court (GENERAL ELECTION WINNER)
  - EDUCATION: B.A. Law & Psychology, Carleton University, 1985; J.D. Gonzaga University School of Law, cum laude, 1988.
  - OCCUPATION: Spokane District & Municipal Court Judge, Position 4.
  - EMPLOYER: Spokane County District & Municipal Court.
  - LEGAL/JUDICIAL EXPERIENCE: Judge Patti Connolly Walker is the only Position 4 candidate with judicial experience. Elected in 2002 to District & Municipal Court after serving as Court Commissioner, Judge Walker was first a civil litigation attorney and criminal prosecutor for 13 years. She set up the Internet Crimes Unit, prosecuted adult entertainment cases and individuals who sexually abused children. She successfully argued constitutional cases before the Washington State Supreme Court, Court of Appeals and Federal Ninth Circuit Court of Appeals.
  - OPTIONAL INFORMATION: An avid hockey coach, Patti shares her love of hockey and sports with her three children ages 13, 11 and 8.
  - Candidate Statement: A trusted leader in our court, Judge Walker was elected Acting Presiding Judge for 2006. A community leader, she was President of multiple Lawyers Associations and served on numerous Boards. Accomplished, fair and impartial, she was instrumental in developing and implementing the comprehensive DUI court. Judge Walker is endorsed by those who closely monitor the courts including Judges & Community Leaders, the Regional Labor Council, State Patrol Troopers Association, Washington Council of Police/Sheriffs, Fraternal Order of Police, Spokane Police Guild, Spokane Sheriffs Association, Spokane Firefighters Union and Prosecutor Steve Tucker. She is rated Exceptionally Well Qualified - Washington Women Lawyers.
  - Questionnaire: Received by Spokane County Bar Association
  - Official web site: www.judgepattiwalker.com
- Mary C. Logan
  - Website: https://web.archive.org/web/20070630181633/http://www.maryloganforjudge.com/

Spokane County District Court Position 5

- Gregory J. Tripp - Incumbent (GENERAL ELECTION WINNER)
  - Website: https://web.archive.org/web/20070929044901/http://www.judgetripp.com/
  - Rated exceptionally well-qualified by the Spokane County Bar Association and Washington Women Lawyers
  - Candidate Statement: "A District Court Judge since 1997, I am honored to serve the Spokane community, where I have lived and worked for over 30 years. As the only candidate with long term, proven experience as an attorney, prosecutor and judge, I have the support of our local legal community. Anyone who appears in court deserves to be treated with respect and courtesy. A judge should be open-minded and fair - and those who have committed crimes should be held accountable for their actions."
  - Endorsed by The Spokesman Review, see website for list of extensive legal community endorsements
- Jeffrey Leslie

Spokane County District Court Position 6

- Debra R. Hayes (PRIMARY WINNER) (GENERAL ELECTION WINNER)
  - Website: https://web.archive.org/web/20061208103020/http://www.debrahayesforjudge.com/
- Mike Nelson (PRIMARY WINNER)
  - Website: http://www.willworkforjustice.com/
- Harvey A. Dunham - Incumbent (appointed)
  - Website: http://www.retain-dunham.com
- David Stevens
  - Deputy Spokane County Prosecutor, U.S. Navy veteran
  - Website: http://www.davidstevens.org/
- Christine L. Carlile

Spokane County District Court Position 7

- Donna Wilson - Incumbent

Spokane County District Court Position 8

- Annette S. Plese - Incumbent

Spokane County District Court Position 9

- Richard B. White - Incumbent

=== Stevens County ===
Stevens County Assessor

- Al Taylor (R)

Stevens County Auditor

- Tim Gray (D)

Stevens County Clerk

- Patricia A. Chester (D)

Stevens County Commissioner District 2

- Merrill J. Ott (R)

Stevens County Coroner

- Patti Hancock (D)

Stevens County Prosecuting Attorney

- John G. Wetle (R)

Stevens County Sheriff

- Craig Thayer (D)

Stevens County Treasurer

- Sue Harnasch (D)

Stevens County District Court Judge

- Pamela F. Payne (NP)

Stevens County PUD Commissioner District 2

- K.O. (Ken) Rosenberg

=== Thurston County ===
(Visit the Thurston County Auditor's web site for current information.)

Thurston County Conservation District Supervisor Position 2

- David L. Hall

Thurston County PUD Commissioner District 1

- Paul J. Pickett (NP)
- Bud Kerr (NP)

Thurston County Commissioner District 3

- Kevin O'Sullivan (R)
- Bob Macleod (D)

Thurston County Assessor

- Patricia Costello (D)
- Tom Crowson (R)

Thurston County Auditor

- Kim Wyman (R)

Thurston County Clerk

- Betty J. Gould (D)

Thurston County Coroner

- Terry Harper (R)
- Gary Warnock (D)

Thurston County Prosecuting Attorney

- Ed Holm (D)

Thurston County Sheriff

- Howard Thronson (R)
- Dan Kimball (D)

Thurston County Superior Court Judge Position 8

- Anne Hirsch (NP)
- Jim Powers (NP)

Thurston County District Judge Position 1

- Susan A. Dubuisson

Thurston County District Judge Position 2

- CL (Kip) Stilz

Chambers Lake Drainage District No. 3 Position 2

- John Livingston

Hopkins Drainage District No. 2 Position 2

- Chuck Cline

Scott Lake Drainage District No. 11 Position 3

- Paul Eddy

Zenker Valley Drainage District No. 7 Position 3

- Vacant

=== Whatcom County ===
Whatcom County Council District 1

- L. Ward Nelson (NP)

=== Yakima County ===
Yakima County Commissioner Position 3

- Jesse Palacios (R)

Yakima County Assessor

- Dave Cook (R)

Yakima County Auditor

- Corky Mattingly (D)

Yakima County Clerk

- Kim Eaton (R)

Yakima County Coroner

- Maurice Rice (R)

Yakima County Prosecuting Attorney

- Ron Zirkle (R)

Yakima County Sheriff

- Ken Irwin (R)

Yakima County Treasurer

- Ilene Thompson (R)

Yakima County District Court Position 1

- Kevin Roy

Yakima County District Court Position 2

- Rod Fitch

Yakima County District Court Position 3

- Donald W. Engel

Yakima County District Court Position 4

- Michael McCarthy

Yakima County Educational Service District #105 Director Position 2

- Maggie Perez

Yakima County Educational Service District #105 Director Position 4

- Patsy Callaghan

Yakima County Educational Service District #105 Director Position 6

- Bruce Ricks

== Judicial races ==
=== Court of Appeals Division I, District 1, Position 4 ===
(King County)

- Ronald E. Cox - Incumbent

=== Court of Appeals Division I, District 1, Position 7 ===
(King County)

- Marlin J Appelwick - Incumbent

=== Court of Appeals Division I, District 3, Position 1 ===
(Island, San Juan, Skagit, and Whatcom Counties)

- Mary Kay Becker - Incumbent
- Jeff Teichert

=== Court of Appeals Division II, District 1, Position 3 ===
(Pierce County)

- Christine Quinn-Brintnall - Incumbent
- Beth Jensen

=== Court of Appeals Division II, District 2, Position 2 ===
(Clallam, Grays Harbor, Jefferson, Kitsap, Mason, and Thurston Counties)

- David H. Armstrong - Incumbent

=== Court of Appeals Division II, District 3, Position 1 ===
(Clark, Cowlitz, Lewis, Pacific, Skamania, and Wahkiakum Counties)

- Joel Penoyar - Incumbent (ELECTION WINNER, His name was the only name on the ballot for the position in the general election.)
- Brent Boger

=== Court of Appeals Division III, District 1, Position 1 ===
(Ferry, Lincoln, Okanogan, Pend Oreille, Spokane, and Stevens Counties)

- John A. Schultheis - Incumbent

=== Court of Appeals Division III, District 3, Position 2 ===
(Chelan, Douglas, Kittitas, Klickitat, and Yakima Counties)

- Teresa C. Kulik - Incumbent
