= Laurel Currie Oates =

Laurel Currie Oates is a legal author and law professor at Seattle University School of Law. Oates is also a visiting professor at the University of Witwatersrand School of Law in Johannesburg.

She was a co-founder of the Legal Writing Institute, which now has more than 8,000 members; helped establish its newsletter known as The Second Draft; and helped organize and host seven of its national conferences, including the 1984, 1986, 1988, 1992, 1996, 2000, and 2004 conferences. She is the co-author of five books, including The Legal Writing Handbook, which is now in its eighth edition, and Just Research, Just Memos, Just Briefs, and Just Writing.

After graduating from the University of Puget Sound Law School (now the Seattle University School of Law), she clerked for the Washington Court of Appeals. In 1980, Professor Oates joined the faculty at Seattle University School of Law until June 2021.

She designed and taught in the Legal Writing program at Seattle University School of Law, which has been ranked as the best or second best legal writing program in the United States by U.S. News & World Report in 14 or the last 15 years during her tenure there.

In 2014, Oates launched the Law School's first online course, a course on effective legal writing.

During the last fifteen years, Oates has taught multiple courses and workshops on legal writing in Afghanistan, Botswana, China, Ethiopia, India, Liberia, South Africa, Uganda, and the United States. She has hosted programs for both students and lawyers in South Africa. In 2018, she helped design an online Legal Writing course, which is now being used in South African law schools.

== Awards ==
In June 2007, Oates received the Burton Award for Outstanding Contributions to Legal Writing Education at the Library of Congress in Washington D.C.; in October 2009 she received the Marjorie Rombauer Award for Contributions to the Teaching of Legal Writing; in October 2012 she received the Tom Holdych Award for Meritorious and Transformational Service, and in 2016 she received both the Global Legal Skills Award and the Terri LeClercq Courage Award for her work in Afghanistan.
