= Seattle University School of Law =

Law school in Seattle, Washington, US

Coordinates: 47°36′35″N 122°19′03″W

- Established: 1972
- School type: Private, Jesuit
- Parent endowment: $312 million (2021)
- Dean: Anthony Varona
- Location: Seattle, Washington, United States
- Enrollment: 489 full-time, 120 part-time
- Faculty: 59 full-time, 154 non-full-time
- USNWR ranking: 111th (2024)
- Bar pass rate: 75.3% 2015 (WA state average is 79.9%)
- Website: law.seattleu.edu
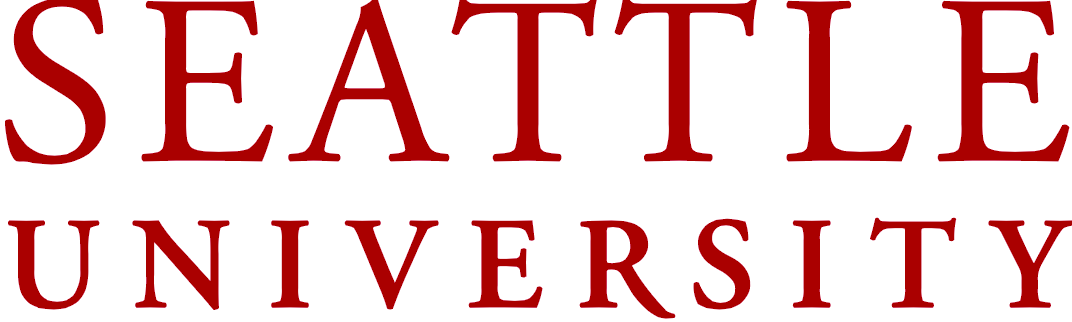

Seattle University School of Law (formerly University of Puget Sound School of Law) is the law school affiliated with Seattle University, located in Seattle, Washington, United States.

The School is accredited by the American Bar Association and is a member of the Association of American Law Schools. Alumni of Seattle University School of Law practice in all 50 U.S. states and 18 foreign countries. The law school offers degree programs for Juris Doctor (JD), Master of Laws (LLM) and Master of Studies in Law (MLS).

According to Seattle University School of Law's 2020 ABA-required disclosures, 86% of the class of 2020 obtained bar passage-required or JD-advantage employment nine months after graduation.

== History ==
The law school was founded as the University of Puget Sound Law School in Tacoma around 1972 and was accredited by the ABA in 1975. In the 1974–75 academic year, the student bar association was established, the first edition of the law review was published, and the first law clinic was started.

In September 1980, the Norton Clapp Law Center was dedicated. This new law center helped to draw a class of 466 students—130 more than anticipated—into the entering class of 1980.

=== Move to Seattle ===
Seattle University purchased the University of Puget Sound Law School in November 1993. The law school officially became part of Seattle University in August 1994.

Kellye Testy was appointed dean on February 15, 2005. During her tenure at the law school, she co-founded the Law School's Access to Justice Institute, the Seattle Journal for Social Justice, and the Center on Corporations, Law & Society. In 2009, Testy left Seattle University to be the new dean at the University of Washington School of Law. Mark Niles, Associate Dean for Academic Affairs at the American University Washington College of Law in Washington, D.C., served as dean of the School of Law from 2010 to 2013 before returning to American University.

In 2013, the School of Law welcomed Annette Clark as its permanent dean. After completing her MD at the University of Washington in 1985, she earned her J.D. from Seattle University in 1989 and served on the SU Law faculty for many years. Dean Clark was the first alumna of the law school to serve as its dean. Her areas of expertise include civil procedure, medical liability, bioethics, and legal education.

In August 2021, Dean Clark announced her intention to retire. Former Miami Law Dean, Tony Varona was selected to succeed Dean Clark.

== Location, Institutes, and Centers ==
Seattle University's 42-acre (17 ha) campus is located in the First Hill area of Seattle.

=== Sullivan Hall ===
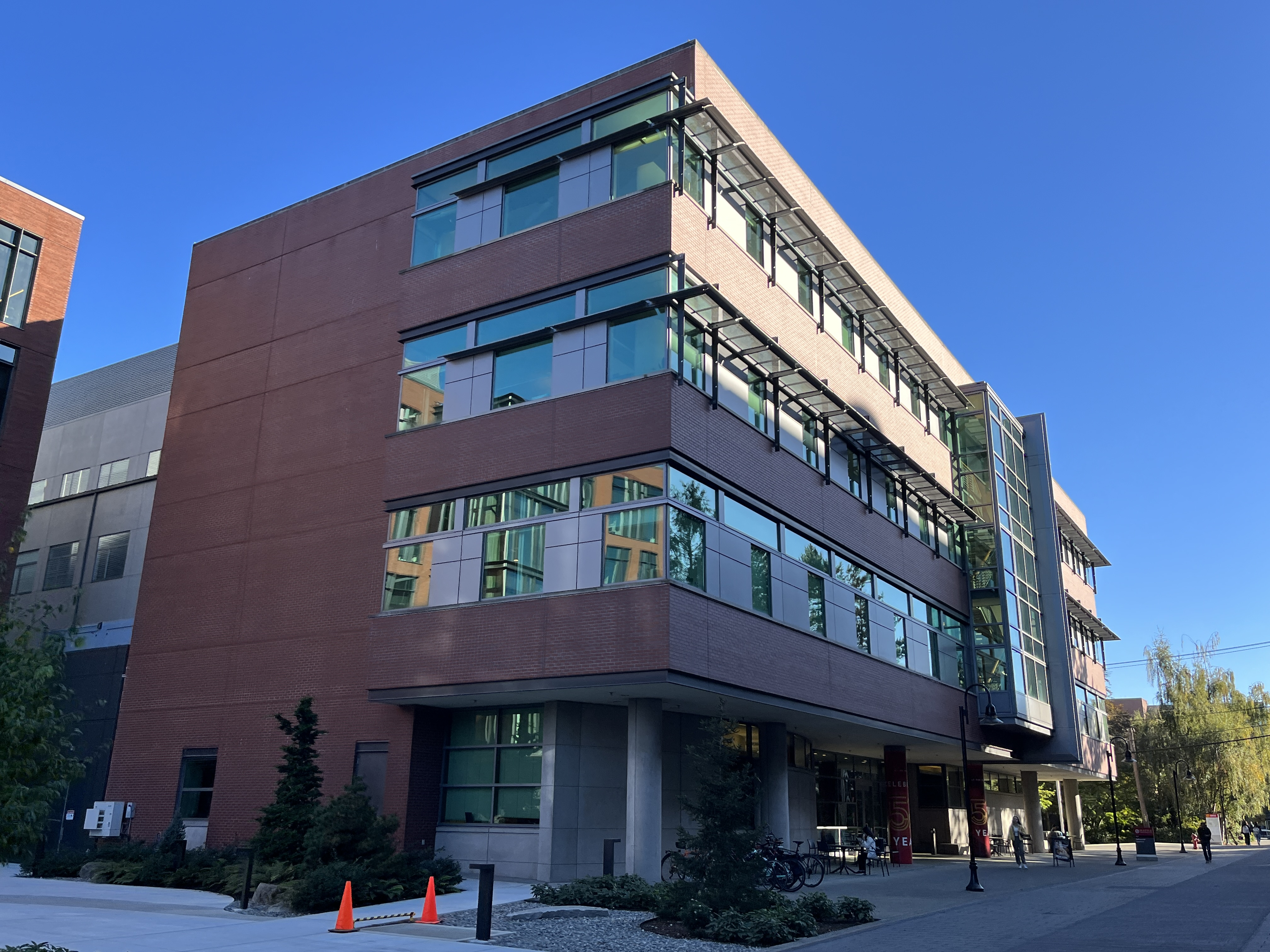
The building's exterior

Sullivan Hall, home to the School of Law, is a five-story building housing the law school and law library on the eastern boundary of Seattle University campus. It features a street-front law clinic, media-equipped classrooms, law library, full courtroom, and activity areas. The court room is used for class, mock trials and actual court proceedings administrated by local judges.

Designed by Olson/Sundberg, the 135,000-square-foot building was completed in August 1999 and cost approximately $21 million.

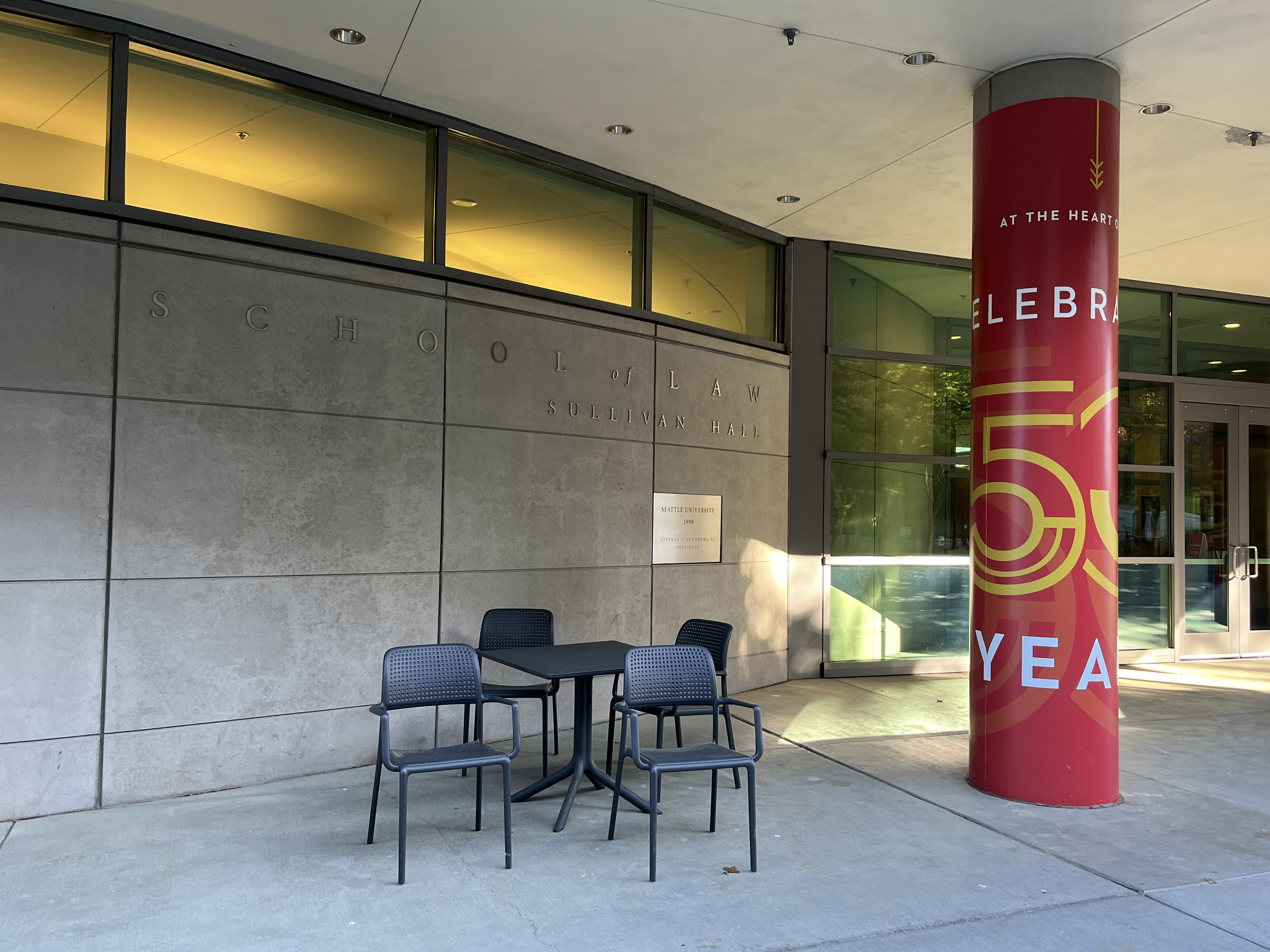
Exterior

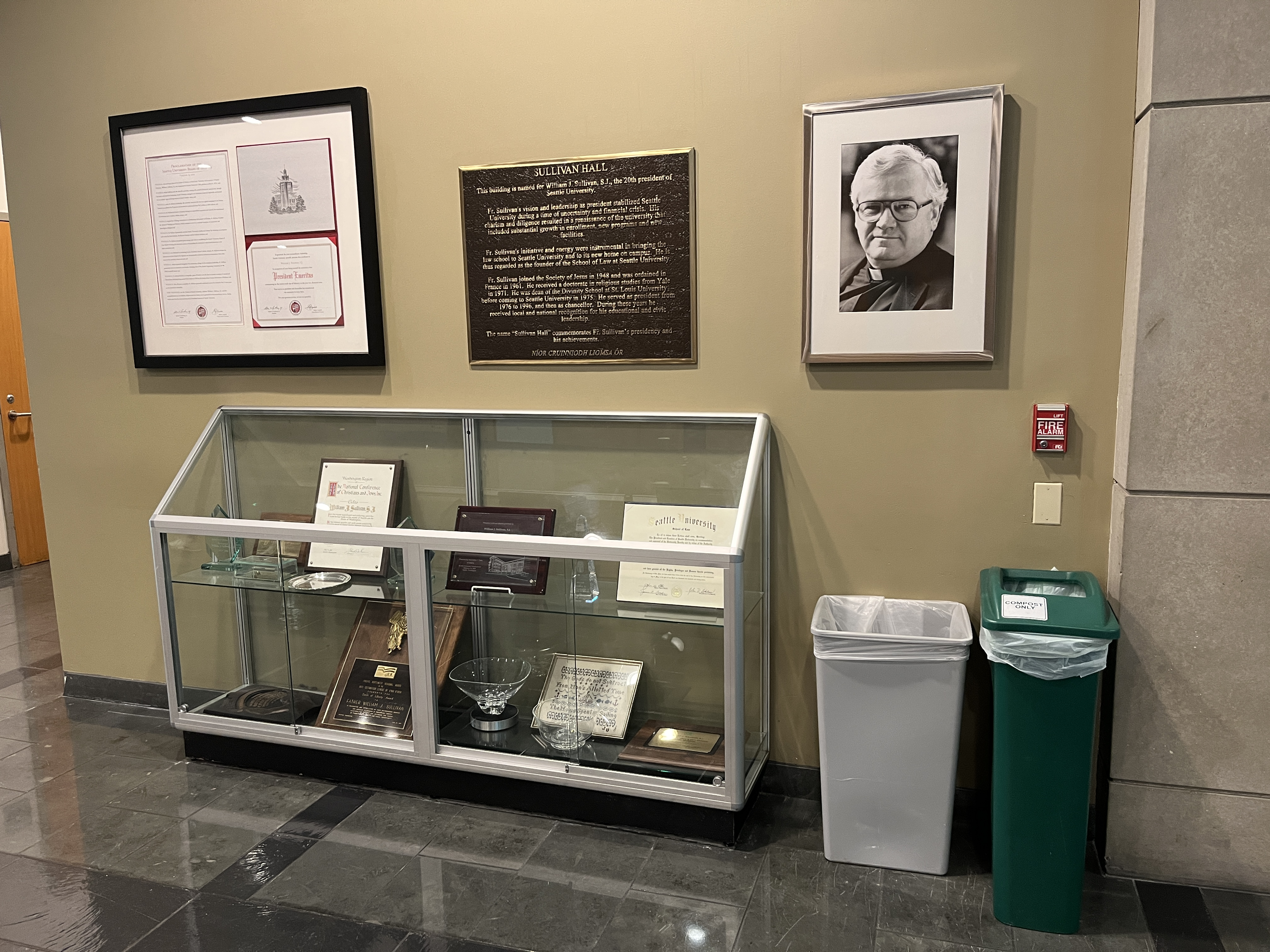
Interior

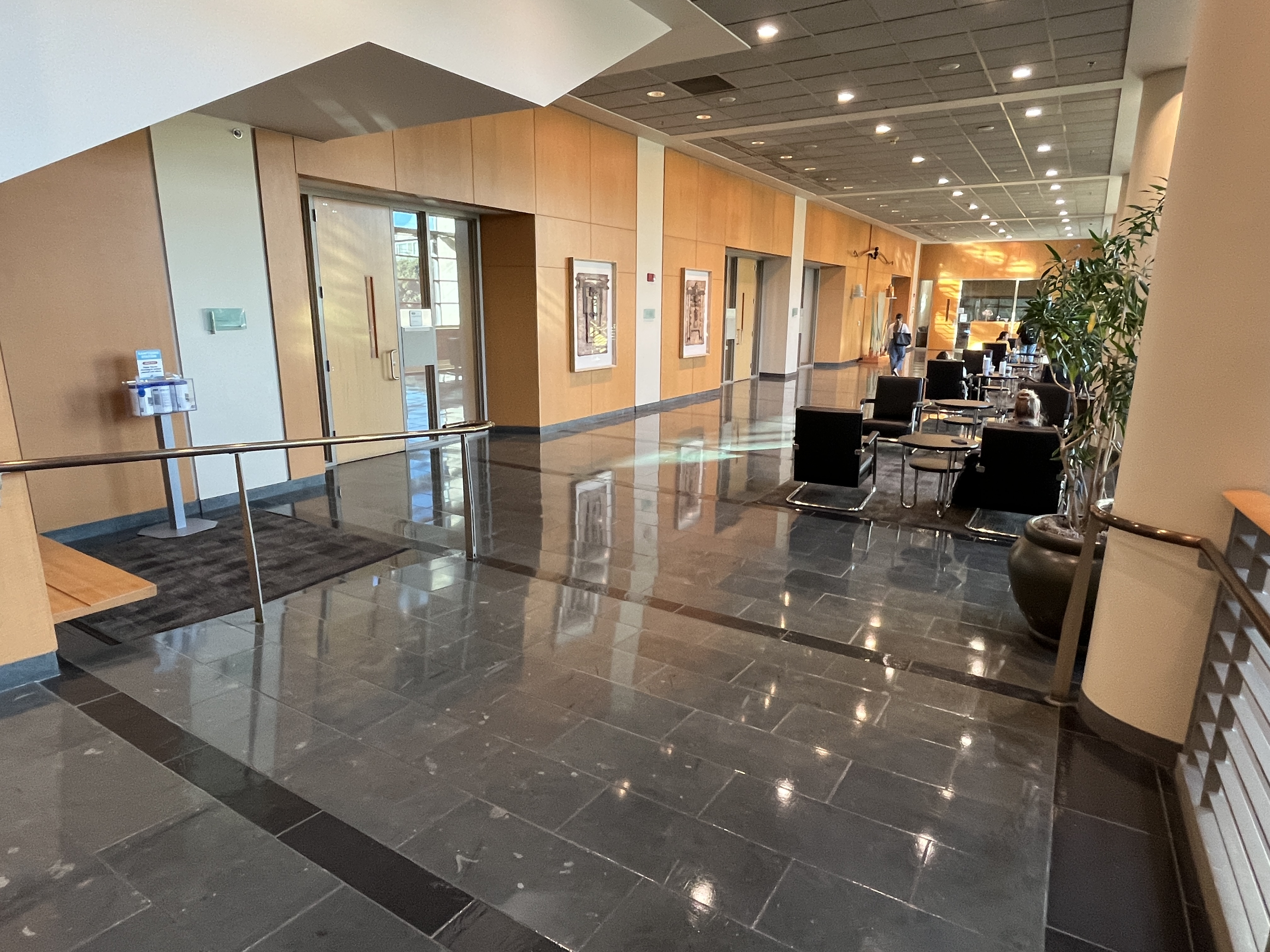
Interior

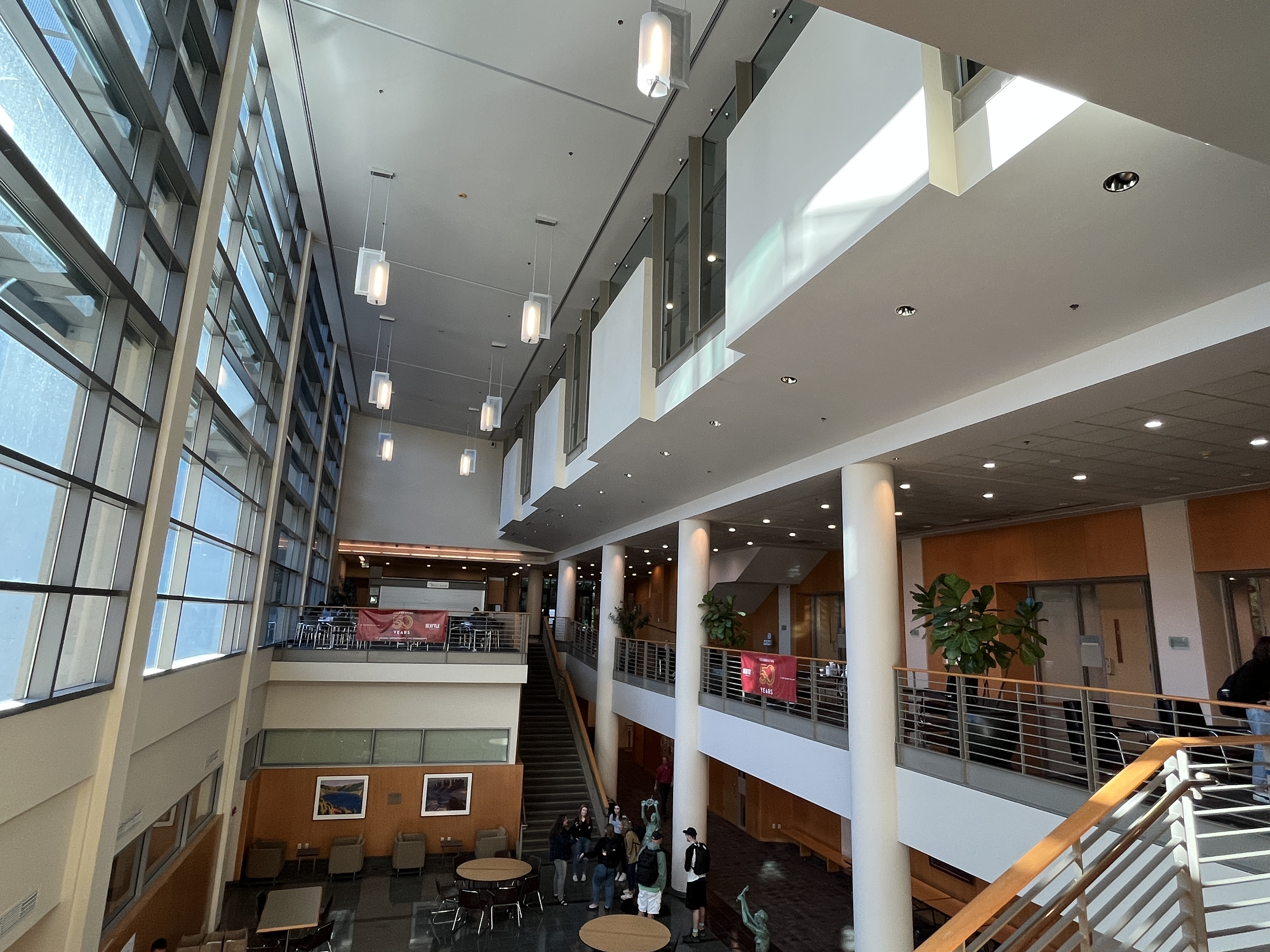
Interior

=== Law Library ===
The Seattle University School of Law Library was founded in 1972. Located in Sullivan Hall, the library occupies four floors. The law library provides information resources and services to support the instructional, research and scholarship endeavors of the Law School.

=== Access to Justice Institute ===
The Access to Justice Institute (ATJI) is home to the law school's pro bono, public interest, and social justice activities. The ATJI is also home to the Incubator Program, which trains and provides resources to lawyers that want to start their own law firms that serve moderate-income clients.

=== The Adolf A. Berle Jr. Center on Corporations, Law and Society ===
Established in 2009, the Adolf A. Berle Jr. Center promotes and hosts legal research, education, and events on the role of the rule of law in governing and mediating the relationships among governments, corporations, individuals, and society.

=== Fred T. Korematsu Center for Law and Equality ===
The center is the civil rights arm of the law school, and it aims to advance justice and equality through research, advocacy, and education. The Center seeks to combat discrimination, train the next generation of social justice advocates, and helps underrepresented communities learn to advocate for themselves. The center is named after dissident Fred T. Korematsu, who was incarcerated by the U.S. government during the Japanese internment camps of World War II.

In 2024, the Korematsu Center moved to the University of California, Irvine School of Law.

== Rankings ==
Seattle University School of Law is tied for #128 in Best Law Schools and #13 in Part-time Law in U.S. News & World Report's 2026 rankings. The university's law school programs ranked in the Top 30 on the "Best Graduate Schools" list.

== Juris Doctor program ==
=== Admissions ===
Admission to the law school is competitive with an acceptance rate of 52%. In admission decisions, the law school places equal emphasis on three factors: (1) LSAT performance; (2) the undergraduate academic record; and (3) personal achievements. Admission is made to either the full-time day or part-time evening program. The mean LSAT score for admitted students is 157, and the median undergraduate GPA is 3.51.

Students admitted to the full-time program can choose to begin classes in June to reduce their first semester course-load in August. All part-time students begin in June.

2023 matriculating students were 65% women, 31% First Generation College Students, 45% students of color, 31% identify as LGBTQ, and average age of 29.

=== Focus areas ===
Seattle University School of Law offers "pathways" as one way for students to decide which courses to take, though choosing a pathway is not required. These pathways demonstrate sequences within and connections across the curriculum. Current pathways include:

- Business law
- Constitutional law
- Commercial law
- Criminal law
- Environmental law, natural resource, and land use
- Family law
- Health law
- Law and social inequality
- Intellectual property, innovation and technology
- Litigation
- Labor and employment law
- Real estate law
- Taxation law

== Employment ==
According to the school's official 2017 ABA-required disclosures, 76.5% of the class of 2017 obtained bar passage-required employment nine months after graduation. Seattle University School of Law's Law School Transparency under-employment score is 22.8%, indicating the percentage of the class of 2017 unemployed, pursuing an additional degree, or working in a non-professional, short-term, or part-time job nine months after graduation.

== Costs and financial aid ==
The total cost of attendance (indicating the cost of full-time tuition, fees, and living expenses) at Seattle University School of Law for the academic year is $70,564.

The Law School Transparency estimated debt-financed cost of attendance for three years is $235,798.

== Publications ==
- Seattle University Law Review (flagship journal)
- Seattle Journal for Social Justice
- Seattle Journal of Technology, Environmental, and Innovation Law
- The American Indian Law Journal

== Notable alumni ==
- Greg Anton, musician, recording artist, writer, and practicing attorney
- Ralph Beistline, Chief Judge, United States District Court for the District of Alaska.
- Anne Bremner, trial attorney and legal commentator
- Desley Brooks, former member of the Oakland City Council, former vice mayor of Oakland, California, and lawyer
- Annette Clark, Dean of Seattle University School of Law
- Frank E. Cuthbertson, first African-American judge on the Pierce County Superior Court
- Janet K.G. Dickson, law professor and legal writing expert
- Joe Fain, member of the Washington State Senate and lawyer
- Tom Galligan, former college president and Dean of the Paul M. Hebert Law Center
- Lorena González, politician, President of Seattle City Council
- Kristin Hannah, novelist, writer of The Nightingale (2015)
- John J. Burns, Attorney General of Alaska
- Ted Bundy, serial killer
- Nick Harper, member of the Washington State Senate and lawyer
- Steve Haugaard, politician, Speaker of the South Dakota House of Representatives
- Laurie Jinkins, politician, Speaker of the Washington House of Representatives.
- Charles W. Johnson, Associate Chief Judge, Washington Supreme Court
- Debora Juarez, member of the Seattle City Council and lawyer
- Anne Kirkpatrick, first female police chief of Oakland
- Richard Labunski, American columnist and journalism professor
- Lee Lambert, Chancellor of Pima Community College
- Paula Lustbader, law professor, renowned legal educator in professional civility
- Rajeev Majumdar, lawyer and President of the Washington State Bar Association
- William Marler, food-borne illness attorney
- Steve McAlpine, lawyer and 5th Lieutenant Governor of Alaska
- Mark D. McLaughlin, business executive and CEO of cybersecurity firm Palo Alto Networks, Inc.
- Ron Meyers, trial attorney and former Speaker Pro Tempore of the Washington House of Representatives
- Brian T. Moran, United States Attorney for the Western District of Washington
- Laurel Currie Oates, author, law professor, co-founder of the Legal Writing Institute, and pioneer in the academic field of legal writing
- Steve O'Ban, member of the Washington State Senate and lawyer
- Patrick Oishi, prosecutor and current judge of the King County Superior Court
- Greg Overstreet, lawyer and member of the Montana legislature
- Sean Parnell, former Governor of Alaska and lawyer
- Joe Paskvan, former member of the Alaskan House of Representatives
- Linda Lau, former Judge, Washington Court of Appeals
- Benson Porter, banker, current president and CEO of BECU
- Michele Radosevich, Wisconsin State Senator and lawyer
- Mary Robnett, first woman Pierce County Prosecuting Attorney.
- Cheryl Pflug, member of the Washington State Senate.
- Greg Gilday, member of the Washington State House of Representatives
- Angela Rye, former director of the Congressional Black Caucus (2012-13), podcaster
- Charles Swift, national security law and civil rights expert, defense counsel in Hamdan v. Rumsfeld
- Linda Trujillo, politician, member of the New Mexico House of Representatives
- Christine Quinn-Brintnall, former Judge, Washington Court of Appeals
- Bill Walker, former Governor of Alaska and former mayor of Valdez, Alaska
- Tracy Staab, Judge, Washington Court of Appeals
- Richard N.W. Wohns, renowned neurosurgeon and professor
- Rufus Yerxa, former Deputy Director-General of the World Trade Organization and former Deputy U.S. Trade Representative
- Eric Gibbs, consumer protection law expert and attorney
- Lisa L. Sutton, Judge, Washington Court of Appeals
- G. Helen Whitener, Associate Justice, Washington Supreme Court
- Tarra Simmons, lawyer, politician, member of the Washington State House of Representatives
- Katrina Foley, Member, Orange County Board of Supervisors, former mayor of Costa Mesa, and attorney
- Jamal Whitehead, Judge, United States District Court for the Western District of Washington

== Notable faculty ==
- Cyrus Vance Jr., Manhattan District Attorney
- Dean Spade, founder of the Sylvia Rivera Law Project
- David Skover, constitutional law scholar
- Eduardo Peñalver, former Dean of Cornell Law School and property law scholar
- Jill Otake, Judge, United States District Court for the District of Hawaii
- Nikkita Oliver, political activist
- Courtney Milan, legal scholar and pioneer of the #MeToo movement in the federal judiciary
- Wallace Loh, former Seattle University Law School dean, legal scholar, and renowned academic administrator
- Lauren King, Judge of the United States District Court for the Western District of Washington
- John H. Chun, Judge of the United States District Court for the Western District of Washington
- Mary Yu, Associate Justice, Supreme Court of Washington
- Laurel Currie Oates, pioneer of the legal writing academic field
- Randy Gordon, attorney and former member of the Washington State Senate
- Richard Delgado, legal scholar and pioneer of critical race theory in the law
- Annette Clark, legal scholar, bioethicist, and Dean of Seattle University Law School
- Joaquin Avila, renowned civil rights attorney, drafter of the California Voting Rights Act, and MacArthur Genius Fellow
- John McKay, former United States Attorney for the Western District of Washington
- Charles W. Johnson, Associate Chief Justice, Supreme Court of Washington
- Cyrus Habib, former Lieutenant Governor of Washington
