= Lisa Sutton =

Lisa Sutton may refer to:

- Lisa Sutton Gunderson, Asian-American entrepreneur
- Lisa L. Sutton, Washington Court of Appeals judge
