= Romancing the Runoff =

Romancing the Runoff was a charity auction held in 2020, supporting voter organizations in the U.S. state of Georgia. It supported the Democratic Party's Senate candidates participating in the 2020–21 United States Senate election in Georgia and the 2020–21 United States Senate special election in Georgia runoff elections.

Organized by romance authors Alyssa Cole, Courtney Milan and Kit Rocha, and inspired by Stacey Abrams' involvement in favor of the Democrats in Georgia, the auction raised $498,000 (including $95,000 before the auction started) for the Georgia voter organizations Fair Fight Action, the New Georgia Project, and Black Voters Matter. Items auctioned were romance-related things and events, including signed copies of novels by Tessa Dare and Stacey Abrams, and a writing mentorship with Ann Aguirre.

== Romancing the Vote ==
In 2022, the Romancing the Runoff team ran the Romancing the Vote fundraiser. Romancing the Vote 2022 raised $188,000 in support of Fair Fight Action.
