= RIPL =

RIPL may refer to:

- John Marshall Review of Intellectual Property Law
- Remote Initial Program Load
