= Joel M. Penoyar =

American judge and politician

Joel Penoyar
- Education: University of Oregon
- Occupation: Judge

Joel Penoyar is a judge on the Washington Court of Appeals. He was appointed in 2005 by Governor Christine Gregoire and was elected to the position in 2006. He also received the WSBA Community Service Award in 2006. Before being appointed, he served as the Superior Court Judge of Pacific and Wahkiakum Counties.

Penoyar is originally from Michigan and attended the University of Oregon (law school class of 1974). He was admitted to the Washington Bar in 1975 and was appointed as a district court judge the following year.
