= Mary Kay Becker =

American politician from Washington state and judge (born 1946)

Judge of the Washington Court of Appeals
- In office 2004–2019

Member of the Washington House of Representatives from the 42nd district
- In office 1975–1983

Personal details
- Born: 1946 (age 79–80)
- Party: Democratic

Mary Kay Becker (born 1946) is an American politician and judge, She has served as a Washington state judge on the Washington Court of Appeals, a former paralegal, Democratic member of the Washington House of Representatives and newspaper editor.

== Background and early career ==
Becker was born in Aberdeen, Washington, and grew up at her family's ocean resort at Kalaloch. She is a graduate of Lake Quinault High School, and earned her undergraduate degree from Stanford University in 1966. After moving to Bellingham in 1969, Becker began her career as a paralegal for Northwest Washington Legal Services. She served as an early editor of the underground newspaper Northwest Passage. In 1974 she wrote the fictional Superspill: An Account of the 1978 Grounding at Bird Rocks (Madrona Press, Seattle) with Patricia Coburn. From 1975 to 1983, she served as a Democratic state representative for the 42nd district. Described at the time as "one of the most articulate voices in the Legislature", "one of the bright lights of the state Democratic party" and "an unequivocal liberal", she chose not to run for re-election in 1982.

== Legal career ==
She earned her Juris Doctor degree in 1982 from the University of Washington School of Law and worked as a private practice lawyer until 1994, when she was appointed to the Court of Appeals. She has also worked as a member of the Whatcom County Council (1984–85) and on the Western Washington University board of trustees (1989–1994).

== Judgeship ==
She was elected to the Court of Appeals position in 1994. She was retained by voters in 2000 and 2006 and she completed her service in 2019. In 2004 she was an unsuccessful candidate for state Supreme Court., losing by 1,086,319 votes (47.97%) to rival Jim Johnson's 1,178,194 (52.03%).

== Family life ==
Becker lives in Bellingham, Washington, with her husband, fellow lawyer Bill Johnston. They have two children, Joe and Maureen.
