= Joaquin Avila (lawyer) =

American lawyer (1948–2018)

Joaquin Guadalupe Avila (June 23, 1948 – March 9, 2018) was an American voting rights attorney and activist. Avila spent more than two decades using the federal Voting Rights Act of 1965 to increase election fairness for minority voters. But as several court precedents weakened the federal Voting Rights Act, Avila conceived of state voting rights acts as a way to again strengthen minority voting rights. Thus Avila crafted the California Voting Rights Act that was enacted in 2001.

Avila brought lawsuits that set important voting rights precedents. He also served as president and general counsel of the Mexican American Legal Defense and Educational Fund, and directed the National Voting Rights Advocacy Initiative at Seattle University School of Law. Among the many honors he received recognizing his work, he was awarded a MacArthur Foundation Fellowship in 1996.

== Early life and education ==
Joaquin Guadalupe Avila was born in Los Angeles, California and grew up in Compton. His father was a foundry worker. He earned his B.A. in political science at Yale University in 1970 and received his J.D. degree from Harvard Law School in 1973. He was an editor of the Harvard Civil Rights-Civil Liberties Law Review.

== Career ==
After law school, Avila worked briefly on voting rights litigation in California before relocating to Texas. There, Avila worked as a staff attorney for the Mexican American Legal Defense and Educational Fund, and quickly rose in the organization, eventually becoming its president and general counsel. He served as president and general counsel of MALDEF from 1982 to 1985, during which he had a hand in over 70 voting rights cases.

After leaving MALDEF, Avila moved to Fremont, California where he successfully argued important voting rights cases, including Gomez v. the City of Watsonville, in which the city's at-large elections for city council diluted the voting power of the city's Latino residents in violation of the federal Voting Rights Act of 1965. He successfully argued two voting rights cases before the United States Supreme Court.

Avila drafted the 2001 California Voting Rights Act (CVRA), which made it easier for plaintiffs to challenge at-large election systems by eliminating one of the criteria required to challenge such systems under the federal Voting Rights Act. The law also required the government to pay the legal fees of plaintiffs who successfully challenge an election system under the law.

In 2003 he authored a UCLA law school report which called for the amendment of the state constitution to allow millions of non-citizen adults to vote in local elections.

Avila later served as practitioner in residence and director of the National Voting Rights Advocacy Initiative at the Seattle University School of Law.

== Awards and honors ==
Avila's work has been recognized by awards that include:

- MacArthur Foundation Fellowship "Genius Grant" (1996)
- State Bar of California Loren Miller Legal Services Award (2001)
- Vanguard Public Foundation Social Justice Sabbatical
- League of United Latin American Citizens President's Award (2012)
- Mexican government Ohtli Award (2011)
- Harvard Law School Association Award (2012)
- Seattle University School of Law Latino Amicus Award (2012)

== Personal life ==
Avila was married to Sally Cabaruvias, and lived in Compton, California, with whom he had three children, Joaquin Jr., Salvador and Angelique. He died of cancer at his home in Shoreline, Washington.
