= Rufus Yerxa =

American lawyer and government official

President National Foreign Trade Council
- In office May 2016 – October 2021
- Preceded by: Bill Reinsch
- Succeeded by: Jake Colvin

Deputy Director General World Trade Organization
- In office 2002–2013
- Preceded by: Andrew Stoler
- Succeeded by: David Shark

Personal details
- Education: University of Washington (BA); Seattle University Law School (JD); University of Cambridge (LLB)

Rufus Hawkins Yerxa (born May 6, 1951) is a retired American lawyer and former U.S. government and international official. He served as Deputy United States Trade Representative during the George H.W. Bush and Clinton Administrations, and served for 11 years as Deputy Director General of the World Trade Organization (WTO). From 2016 to 2021 he was President of the National Foreign Trade Council.

== Education ==
Yerxa holds degrees from

- University of Washington (BA), 1973
- Seattle University (JD), 1976
- University of Cambridge (LLB, International Law), 1977

== Career ==
From 1977 to 1981 he was legal advisor to the chairman of the International Trade Commission. From 1981 to 1989 he was a staff member of the U.S. House Ways and Means Committee, serving as staff director of its Subcommittee on Trade and later as Assistant Chief Counsel of the full Committee.

From 1989 to 1995 he was a Deputy United States Trade Representative (USTR), serving first in Geneva as U.S. ambassador to the General Agreement on Tariffs and Trade (GATT), and subsequently as Deputy USTR in Washington. He played a key role in the Uruguay Round Negotiations, and was later responsible for overseeing the Clinton Administration's efforts to obtain Congressional approval of both NAFTA and the WTO Agreement. After leaving government service In the mid-1990s, he was a resident partner in the Brussels office of Akin, Gump, Strauss, Hauer & Feld, where his practice focused on international trade and European regulatory matters.

In 2002 he was appointed to serve as Deputy Director General of the WTO, a position he held until 2013. During this time he was also a lecturer on U.S. trade policy at the World Trade Institute (WTI) in Berne. After retiring from the WTO he joined the faculty of the Middlebury Institute of International Studies (MIIS) in Monterey, California as a visiting professor.

From 2016 to 2021 he was President of the National Foreign Trade Council (NFTC), a trade association in Washington representing U.S. companies on global trade and investment matters.

From February 2022 to June 2024 he was a senior advisor with McClarty Associates, advising their international trade practice both in Washington and internationally.
