= Seattle University Law Review =

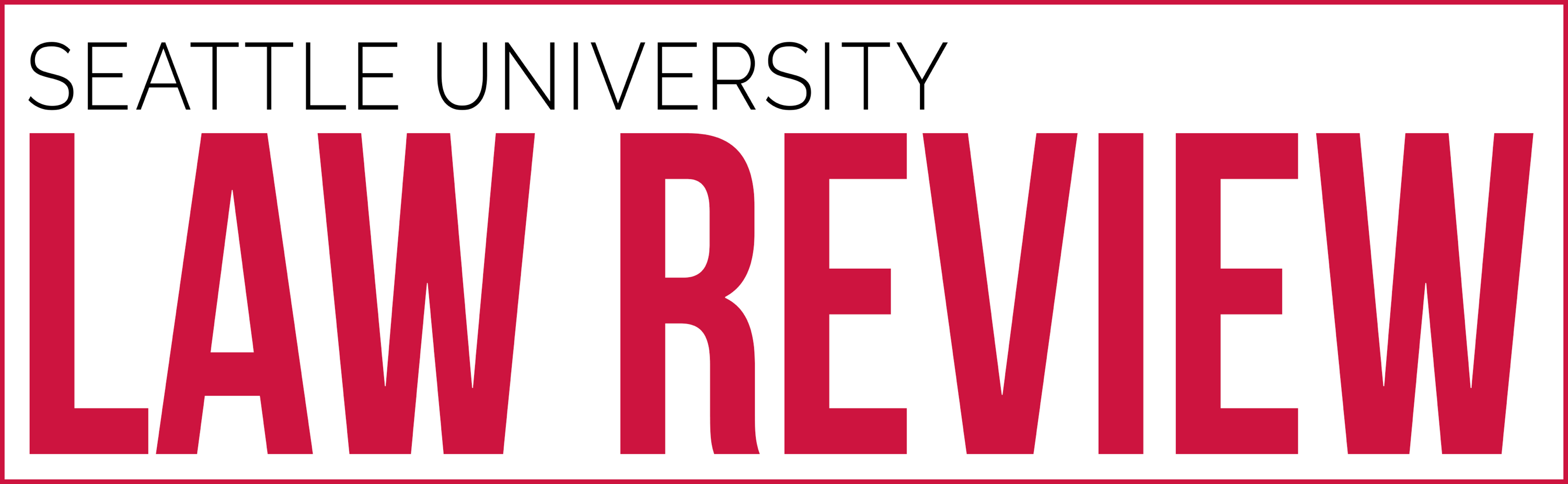
- Discipline: Jurisprudence, Law
- Language: English
- Edited by: Graham Fulton

Publication details
- Former name: University of Puget Sound Law Review
- History: 1975–present
- Publisher: Seattle University Law School (United States)
- Frequency: Quarterly
- Open access: Yes

Standard abbreviations
- Bluebook: Seattle U. L. Rev.
- ISO 4: Seattle Univ. Law Rev.

Indexing
- ISSN: 1078-1927

Links
- Journal homepage

The Seattle University Law Review is the flagship law review journal of the Seattle University School of Law. The journal publishes quarterly and it is currently in its 48th volume. It was originally established as the University of Puget Sound Law Review in 1975.

As of 2021, it is ranked 76th out of 191 flagship law review journals.

== Notable articles ==
Among the most cited articles published in the journal are:

- Roger W. Andersen, Present and Future Interests: A Graphic Explanation, 19 Seattle U. L. Rev 101 (1995).
- Harry v. Jaffa, What Were the "Original Intentions" of the Framers of the Constitution of the United States? 10 Seattle U. L. Rev. 351 (1987).
- Truth, Justice, and Reconciliation Commission, "Commissions of Inquiry - CIPEV Report (Waki Report)" (2008). IX. Government Documents and Regulations. 5.
- Ruth Bader Ginsburg, Women at the Bar—A Generation of Change, 2 Seattle U. L. Rev. 1 (1978).
- Henry M. Jackson, The Pacific Northwest Electric Power Planning and Conservation Act-Solution for a Regional Dilemma, 4 Seattle U. L. Rev. 7 (1980).
- Warren E. Burger, Remarks of Warren E. Burger, Chief Justice of the United States, at the Dedication of the Norton Clapp Law Center, 4 Seattle U. L. Rev. 1 (1980).
- Robert F. Utter, Freedom and Diversity in a Federal System: Perspectives on State Constitutions and the Washington Declaration of Rights, 7 Seattle U. L. Rev. 491 (1984).
- Alex Kozinski, Keynote Colloquy: Finding Justice in the Internet Dimension, 20 Seattle U. L. Rev 619 (1997).
- Derrick Bell, Constitutional Conflicts: The Perils and Rewards of Pioneering in the Law School Classroom, 21 Seattle U. L. Rev. 1039 (1998).
- Shirley S. Abrahamson, The Appeal of Therapeutic Jurisprudence, 24 Seattle U. L. Rev. 228 (2000).
- James Eisenstein, The U.S. Attorney Firings of 2006: Main Justice's Centralization Efforts in Historical Context, 31 Seattle U. L. Rev. 219 (2007).
- John McKay, Train Wreck at the Justice Department: An Eyewitness Account, 31 Seattle U. L. Rev. 265 (2007).
- Judge Stephen J. Dwyer, Leonard J. Feldman, and Ryan McBride, How to Write, Edit, and Review Persuasive Briefs: Seven Guidelines from One Judge and Two Lawyers, 31 Seattle U. L. Rev. 417 (2008).
