= Courtney Milan =

American author

- Born: 1976 (age 49–50)
- Other name: Courtney Milan
- Education: Florida State University (BS); University of California, Berkeley (MS); University of Michigan (JD)
- Occupation: Writer
- Years active: 2009–present
- Website: courtneymilan.com

Courtney Milan, a pseudonym for Heidi Bond, is an American author of historical and contemporary romance novels. After releasing her first few books under a traditional publishing contract, Milan has self-published more recent works.

Prior to her writing career, Bond was a law clerk for Sandra Day O'Connor of the United States Supreme Court and for Judge Alex Kozinski. As the Me Too movement gained steam, Bond alleged that Kozinski had sexually harassed her. Kozinski soon resigned his lifetime appointment, and Chief Justice of the United States John Roberts ordered a review of how the federal judiciary handled reports of sexual harassment.

Milan served on the board of directors of the Romance Writers of America (RWA) for four years, spearheading efforts to make the organization more diverse and inclusive. In late 2019, the RWA board voted to suspend Milan for calling another author's book racist. The board reinstated her days later, noting irregularities with the process. The resulting controversy led to the mass resignation of half of the RWA board of directors, the resignation of the RWA executive director, and the cancellation of the 2020 RITA Award program.

== Early life and education ==
Milan was born in 1976, to her American father Doug Bond, a professor of chemistry at the University of California, Riverside, and her Chinese-American mother, Gloria. According to her website, Milan was raised in Southern California. She wrote her first book at the age of ten and intended to be an author from a young age. She received a bachelor's degree with a double major in mathematics and chemistry from Florida State University in 2000.

Milan attended the University of California, Berkeley, where she earned a master's degree in theoretical physical chemistry. She then went to the University of Michigan Law School, where she received the Henry Moore Bates scholarship. In 2006, she graduated summa cum laude.

== Career ==
During 2007 and 2008, Milan clerked for judge Alex Kozinski of the U.S. Court of Appeals for the Ninth Circuit. Milan later alleged that during her time in his employ, Kozinski called her into his office three times to look at pornography and repeatedly asked if the images aroused her. Milan discussed the harassment and the discomfort it caused her with her friend and fellow author Eve Ortega, but chose not to report it. At the time, there were no methods for clerks to report harassment and remain anonymous.

Milan was then hired to clerk for the Supreme Court of the United States, first for Associate Justice Sandra Day O'Connor and then for Associate Justice Anthony Kennedy. She took a year-long sabbatical to transition from practicing law to teaching. For the next three years, she was a professor at Seattle University School of Law, teaching contracts and intellectual property.

=== Writing ===
Milan began reading romance novels during her time as a law clerk, as a diversion from the voluminous legal research she was required to do. She decided to write a historical romance novel. Milan told The Washington Post that the transition was natural; "'One of the skills that makes you a good lawyer is the ability to take a bunch of disparate facts and weave them together into something that tells a story that pulls on the human imagination. ... Whether you’re convincing a judge that your client is innocent or convincing your reader that a couple is meant to be, it’s the same skill.'" Her first book, Proof by Seduction, was published by Harlequin in 2010. The novel received a starred review in Publishers Weekly, which called the book "delightful" and praised Milan's humor, characterization, and plot.

Her first several books were published as part of a traditional publishing contract, where a major publisher purchased the rights and Milan received royalties. Under this model, Milan reportedly earned "an average household income" from the sale of her books. In 2011, she chose to self-publish her novels. Within 18 months of embracing self-publishing, Milan quit her job. By 2014, she was producing about two novels per year and earning close to $1 million in royalties each year.

Although Milan had always believed she could earn more by publishing her books herself, money was not her sole motivation. She also wanted increased control over how her books were designed and marketed. Self-publishing does not mean that Milan is solely responsible for every detail of the publication of her novels. She hires professional editors and contracts out her cover design. As of 2013, she had also hired a full-time project manager to help get the books ready for release.

Many of her books have reached the New York Times Bestseller List or the USA Today Bestseller List. In 2015, Milan's series, The Brothers Sinister, was listed among NPR's "100 Swoon-Worthy Romances". NPR described Milan as "a master of the intelligent relationship discussion".

Milan's novella, Her Every Wish, was recognized with a RITA Award from the Romance Writers of America in 2017.

In early 2019, a reader alerted Milan to similarities between Milan's novel The Duchess War and the novel Royal Love by Brazilian author Cristiane Serruya. Milan blogged about multiple instances of sentences or paragraphs from her book that appeared in Serruya's novel. Other authors investigated and found that their work had also been plagiarized in Royal Love and other of Serruya's works. Serruya at first denied any wrongdoing, then withdrew Royal Love from consideration for a RITA Award and blamed the plagiarism on a ghostwriter she had hired to write the book.

== Advocacy ==
=== #MeToo ===
In late 2017, the #MeToo movement gained traction, as increasing numbers of women spoke out about sexual harassment that they had experienced in the workplace. Milan shared details of her experiences working for Judge Kozinski, when he was still the Chief Judge (2007–14) of the Ninth Circuit Court of Appeals, with The Washington Post. Other women shared similar stories about Kozinski's behavior. Milan was one of only two women to allow her real name to be used; as she was no longer practicing law, she did not fear the loss of her job. After significant scrutiny, Kozinski resigned from his lifetime position on the federal bench. This effectively halted any investigation into his behavior. Chief Justice of the United States John Roberts commissioned a board to review how harassment claims were handled within the judiciary. The group recommended significant changes.

Six months after Kozinski's resignation, Milan, along with eleven other women who had accused Kozinski of harassment, submitted a letter to the Los Angeles Daily Journal. They criticized the paper and its editor for publishing a column by Kozinski without noting that he had resigned under a cloud of suspicion. As the letter noted, Milan, under her real name Heidi Bond, and the other women will always be known as Kozinski's accusers, and it seems unfair that after six months Kozinski would no longer be known as the accused.

=== Diversity and inclusion ===
Milan was elected to the Romance Writers of America board of directors for multiple terms and served four years. As a board member, Milan pushed for changes to make the organization more diverse and inclusive. More than 80% of the members of the RWA are white, compared to only 61% of the United States population. Milan encouraged other authors of color to join the board and publicly pressed a publisher for answers as to why they had never signed a non-white romance author. For her efforts to increase diversity within the RWA, the Board gave Milan a Service Award in July 2019.

In August 2019, Milan joined an ongoing Twitter conversation about racism and gatekeeping in the romance publishing industry. The conversation originally focused on Sue Grimshaw, a longtime romance buyer who allegedly refused to buy romance novels by authors of color. Grimshaw was hired as an acquiring editor by Suzan Tisdale, an author who had started a small publishing company. Milan reviewed a book written by Tisdale's other acquiring editor, Kathryn Lynn Davis, calling its depiction of a half-Chinese heroine racist.

Tisdale and Davis filed ethics complaints with the RWA against Milan, who was at the time the chair of the RWA's Ethics committee. In her complaint, Davis wrote that Milan “cannot be allowed to hold a position of authority, or to use her voice to urge others to follow her lead" and alleged that Milan's comments had caused Davis to lose a book contract. On request, Milan resigned as chair of the Ethics committee to avoid any conflicts of interest. On December 23, 2019, the RWA Board voted to suspend Milan for one year and ban her from all leadership positions for life. In a statement to CNN, Milan noted that the board sanctioned her for the same behavior that had resulted in an RWA Service Award in July 2019.

There was an intense backlash against the RWA's decision. The board reversed the sanctions a week later, citing irregularities in the process. In a mass resignation, the women of color on the Board of Directors resigned, as did the President, Carolyn Jewell. The RWA was forced to cancel the 2020 RITA Awards after hundreds of authors resigned as judges and more than 300 stories were withdrawn from consideration. Major publishers spoke out against the RWA's decision and announced their intention to skip the 2020 RWA annual conference. The Cultural, Interracial, and Multicultural Special Interest Chapter of the RWA organized a petition to recall the new RWA President, Damon Suede, which gained over 1000 signatures in two days; Suede and RWA executive director Carol Ritter both resigned on January 9. Davis admitted to The Guardian that her initial complaint was exaggerated - she had never had a contract for more books and did not explicitly lose anything because of Milan's comments. Davis further acknowledged that she had rewritten parts of her book to address racial issues after other people told her "calmly" that there were issues.

=== Romancing the Runoff ===
Milan was a co-organizer of Romancing the Runoff, a fundraising event during the 2020–21 United States Senate election in Georgia.

== Personal life ==
Milan and her husband live in the Rocky Mountains with their cat Katya.

== Bibliography ==
=== Carhart series ===
- Heart of Christmas (2009) HQN Books ISBN 0-373-77427-3, October 1, 2009, Paperback
- Proof By Seduction (2010) USA HQN Books ISBN 0-373-77439-7, January 1, 2010, Mass Market Paperback
- Trial by Desire (2010) USA HQN Books ISBN 0-373-77485-0, September 28, 2010, Mass Market Paperback

=== Turner series ===
- Unveiled (2011) USA HQN Books ISBN 0-373-77543-1, January 27, 2011, mass market paperback
- Birthday Gift (2011) USA, Short Story published on her website
- Unlocked (2011) USA ISBN 9781937248000, May 31, 2011, ebook
- Unclaimed (2011) USA HQN Books ISBN 0-373-77603-9, September 20, 2011, mass market paperback
- Out of the Frying Pan (2012) USA, Short Story published on her website
- Unraveled (2011) USA ISBN 1-937-24802-X, December 9, 2001, paperback

=== Brothers Sinister ===
- The Governess Affair (2012) USA CreateSpace ISBN 1-477-58903-1, June 2, 2012, Paperback
- The Duchess War (2012) USA CreateSpace ISBN 1-481-20747-4, December 12, 2012, Paperback
- A Kiss for Midwinter (2013) USA CreateSpace ISBN 1-481-91275-5, January 8, 2013, Paperback
- The Heiress Effect (2013) USA CreateSpace ISBN 1-490-99471-8, July 15, 2013, Paperback
- The Countess Conspiracy (2013) USA CreateSpace ISBN 1-937-24830-5, December 16, 2013, Paperback
- The Suffragette Scandal (2014)
- Talk Sweetly To Me (2014)

=== Cyclone series ===
- Trade Me (2015)
- Hold Me (2016)
- The Year of the Crocodile (2016)
- Find Me (forthcoming)

=== The Worth Saga ===
- Once Upon a Marquess (2015)
- Her Every Wish (2016)
- After The Wedding (2018)
- The Pursuit Of... (2018)
- Mrs. Martin’s Incomparable Adventure (2019)
- The Devil Comes Courting (2021)

=== The Wedgeford Trials ===
- The Duke Who Didn’t (2020)
- The Marquis Who Mustn't (2023)
- The Earl Who Isn't (2024)

== See also ==
- List of law clerks for the first seat of the Supreme Court of the United States
- List of law clerks for the eighth seat of the Supreme Court of the United States
