= David S. Mann (judge) =

American judge

David Mann

Judge of the Court of Appeals of Washington, Division I
- Incumbent
- Assumed office 2016

Personal details
- Education: University of California, Santa Barbara (BA); Lewis & Clark Law School (JD)

David S. Mann is an American lawyer who has served as a judge of the Washington Court of Appeals, Division I since 2016.

== Biography ==
Mann was appointed to Division I of the Washington State Court of Appeals by Governor Jay Inslee in August 2016, and ran unopposed to retain his seat in November 2017. Judge Mann is currently serving as the acting chief judge for Division I and is a member of the Washington Board of Judicial Administration. Mann ran for re-election for the Division I judge of the Washington Court of Appeals. He won in the general election on November 3, 2020.
