= Lisa L. Sutton =

American judge

Lisa Sutton

Judge of the Court of Appeals of Washington, Division II
- Incumbent
- Assumed office October 1, 2014
- Appointed by: Jay Inslee

Judge of the Superior Court of Washington for Thurston County

Personal details
- Born: Lisa L. Sutton
- Education: Pacific Lutheran University (BA); Seattle University (JD)
- Profession: Lawyer, jurist

Lisa L. Sutton (born October 3, 1963) is a Judge of the Washington Court of Appeals.

== Biography ==
Sutton is serving as a judge on the Washington Court of Appeals, Division Two, in Tacoma. She previously served as a judge on the Thurston County Superior Court. Prior to joining the bench, Judge Sutton worked for the Attorney General's Office as a managing attorney and civil litigator.
