= Eric Gibbs =

American lawyer

Eric Gibbs is an American attorney at Gibbs Law Group LLP in the United States. He is a member of the board of governors of the Consumer Attorneys of California. As a part of the American Association for Justice, he co-chairs the Consumer Privacy and Data Breach Litigation Group and the Lumber Liquidators Litigation Group, and serves as the secretary for the Qui Tam Litigation Group.

== Education and early career ==
Gibbs began his legal career at Lieff Cabraser, working his way from the mail room to working as a paralegal. Gibbs attended the Seattle University School of Law and graduated with his juris doctor degree in 1995. After passing the California bar examination he was licensed to practice in that state.

== Career ==
=== Gerard Gibbs LLP ===
Gibbs worked for two years at the Consumer Protection Division of the Washington Attorney General's Office before joining his former colleague from Lieff Cabraser, Daniel Girard, as a named partner at Girard Gibbs LLP which they founded in 1995. After a 20 year period at Gerard Gibbs, Gibbs moved his practice to a new plaintiff's firm, Gibbs Law Group which grew to approximately 20 attorneys. Gibbs litigated General Motors over the organic antifreeze DEX-COOL alledgedly linked to the degradation of engine sealability components. Additionally, Girard Gibbs LLP filed a class action suit against Volkswagen over its circumvention of federal emissions tests. On October 1, 2018, Girard Gibbs LLP changed its name to Girard Sharp LLP and Gibbs opened his own firm.

=== Gibbs Law Group ===
In 2014, Eric Gibbs founded Gibbs Law Group, a national law firm representing consumers, employees, whistleblowers and investors is complex lawsuits.

==== Data Breach Practice ====
In 2013, Gibbs was a lead counsel in the case of the Adobe data breach before the federal court judge, Lucy Koh. This was significant for its examination of the US standing (law) article three in data breach.

Further litigation in the area of data breach followed in 2017 in the consolidated Equifax data breach lawsuit. in 2019, Gibbs successfully argued for plaintiff's pursuance of a nationwide claim for negligence and negligence per se against Equifax.

In 2018, Gibbs received an award from the New York subscription legal news service, Law360, for his litigation of the Anthem Blue Cross Blue Shield data breach to a settlement of $115 million. Gibbs said of the case, "With data breach cases in particular, a lot of what you’re doing is uncertain and untested. There’s not 20 years of data breach jurisprudence that one can draw on”. Then, in 2019, Gibbs received an award for attorney of the year from California Lawyer for his work in data breach and privacy litigation.

Gibb's other court appointed work includes data breach cases against Banner Health and Excellus BlueCross BlueShield.

==== Privacy practice ====
Gibb's firm was appointed co-lead in the litigation of Lenovo in a privacy class action. The lawsuit alleged that Lenovo violated federal hacking and wiretap laws by pre-installing spyware, made by Superfish, on its computers to track their owners' activities, without their consent. An $8.3 million settlement was reached.

Gibbs was also appointed co-lead in litigation against Vizio alleging the company's smart televisions spied on owners without their consent. Gibbs' firm succeeded in defeating Vizio's motion to dismiss the plaintiffs' Video Privacy Protection Act claim and in reaching a $17 million settlement. The settlement required Vizio to delete all the viewing data it had collected without users' consent.

==== Mass Tort Practice ====
Gibbs participated in the mass tort litigation against Johnson & Johnson over its failing to disclose that its antipsychotic drug, Risperdal, could cause growth of breast tissue in men. Janssen Pharmaceuticals was added as a defendant for the same side effect from their antipsychotic drug Invega.

Gibbs also held a leadership role in the mass tort litigation against Takeda Pharmaceuticals concerning allegations that the diabetes drug Actos (Pioglitazone) caused bladder cancer. In 2015, Takeda reached a global settlement with the over 9,000 plaintiffs in the litigation, agreeing to pay them $2.4 billion.

Gibbs' firm provided legal briefing in the Yaz and Yasmin mass tort litigation, concerning allegations that the birth control pills manufactured by Bayer caused blood clots, deep vein thrombosis, and stroke. Bayer paid over $2 billion in settlements to individuals who experienced these side effects, without taking any cases to trial.

Gibbs held a leadership role in the litigation of the Fresenius company which manufactured the dialysis products GranuFlo and Naturalyte over undeclared side effects. In 2017, a $250 million settlement was reached.

==== Consumer Practice ====
Early in his career, Gibbs was a lead counsel in a class action lawsuit against Apple over iPod battery problems. The lawsuit alleged that Apple had promised 8 to 10 hour battery life for early-generation iPods and that the batteries would last the "lifetime" of the iPod, but consumers reported battery performance degrading within 18 months of purchase. Gibbs negotiated a settlement that provided new iPods and monetary reparation to the plaintiffs.

Gibbs participated in the litigation of Chase Bank which alledged that Chase issued attractive loans to consumer in favourable economic times and later increased interests rates on those loans. The case settled for $100 million. The judge noted that the plaintiffs' counsel “fought tooth and nail, down to the wire” to achieve “the best settlement that they could under the circumstances.”

Gibbs was a finalist in the Consumer Attorneys of California 2013 Consumer Attorney of the Year awards. for his work representing plaintiffs against Chase Bank.

== Cases involving court appointed positions ==
- Adobe Systems, Inc. Privacy Litigation, No. 13-cv-05226-LHK
- Velasco v. Chrysler Group LLC, No. 13-cv-08080-DDP-VBK
- Stedman v. Mazda Motor Corporation, No. 8:14-cv-01608-JVS
- Ford Fusion and C-MAX Fuel Economy Litigation, No. 13-MD-2450
- Hyundai and Kia Fuel Economy Litigation, MDL No. 2424, No. 13-m-02424
- JCCP 4775, Risperdal and Invega Product Liability Cases
- Yaeger v. Subaru of America, Inc., No 1:14-cv-04490

== Honors and awards ==
- Top 30 Plaintiff Lawyers in California, 2016
- Consumer Protection MVP for 2016, Law360
- Top 100 Northern California Super Lawyers, 2012-2013
- Northern California Super Lawyers, 2010-2015
- Consumer Attorneys of California 2013 Consumer Attorney of the Year Finalist
- Best Lawyers Guide for Mass Tort Litigation/ Class Actions, 2012-2016
- Martindale-Hubbell AV-Preeminent Rating for Highest Ethics and Legal Skills
