= A Night to Surrender =

2011 novel by Tessa Dare

First edition

A Night to Surrender is a Regency romance written by Tessa Dare and published in 2011. It won a RITA Award for Best Regency Historical Romance and the 2011 Romantic Times award for Historical Love and Laughter.

== Background ==
A Night to Surrender is the first novel in Tessa Dare's Spindle Cove series. It is a Regency romance and was published on August 30, 2011, by Avon.

Avon selected the book to participate in its "K.I.S.S. and Teal" program, donating 25 cents to the Ovarian Cancer National Alliance for each copy the novel sold.

== Plot summary ==
The novel is set during the Regency era, in the remote seaside community of Spindle Cove. Local woman Susanna Finch has turned the village into a retreat for young ladies who do not quite fit into society. Men are, for the most part, not welcome, so that the ladies can be free to be themselves.

Their quiet haven is disrupted with the arrival of the novel's hero, Lieutenant Colonel Victor "Bram" Bramwell. As the new Earl of Rycliff, Bram has inherited a rundown castle on the edge of the village. As rumors fly that Napoleon might invade England, Bram has been assigned to journey to Spindle Cove and organize the local men into a militia. The assignment is important to Bram; he had been injured in battle and wants to prove that he is capable of returning to his command.

Susanna is adamantly opposed to changes in how the town operates, leading to a battle of wits between the protagonists.

== Reception ==
The novel received a starred review from Publishers Weekly, which noted the novel's "endearing one-of-a-kind characters" who indulged in "witty conversations that slowly and seamlessly reveal deep truths". In The Washington Post, Sarah MacLean recommended the book as one of her all-time favorite beach reads, highlighting that the book "is as charming as it is sexy".

Romantic Times named A Night to Surrender its 2011 Historical Love and Laughter winner. The novel also won the 2012 RITA Award for Best Regency Historical.
