= Global Legal Skills Conference =

The Global Legal Skills Conference is a conference hosted by the Global Legal Skills Institute. The goal of the conference is to serve as a resource for law professors, ESL professionals, and other who teach international legal skills and legal writing to persons who speak English as a second language. The GLS Conference Series also includes award presentations to recognize outstanding contributions to the field of international legal skills education.

The first Global Legal Skills conference was held in 2005 at the University of Illinois-Chicago law school, formerly known as The John Marshall Law School in Chicago. The initial conference was a specialized conference connecting legal writing professionals who had an interest in teaching international students and lawyers who spoke English as a second language. The conference series was important because a growing number of lawyers and law students had begun to attend law schools in the United States and other English-speaking countries, and they needed to have special language training in Legal English and related courses. The conference was founded by Professor Mark E. Wojcik of The John Marshall Law School. The GLS Conference series has since grown to include legal writing faculty, international and comparative law professors, clinical faculty, linguists, librarians, judges, attorneys, court translators, law students, and scholars interested in global legal skills education.

Since its inception, the conference has been held in a variety of locations including Chicago, Illinois, United States; Monterrey, Mexico; San Jose, Costa Rica; in Washington D.C., United States; Verona, Italy; Melbourne, Victoria, Australia; Phoenix, Arizona, United States; Nottingham, England, United Kingdom; Bari, Italy; and Brno, Czechia.

The conference series includes presentations of the Global Legal Skills Awards for innovations in international legal skills education. Awards have been presented to individuals for their teaching and academic leadership, for outstanding scholarship and books advancing the field of global legal skills education, for the institutional vision of law firms and other institutions with specialized training in global legal skills, and for law schools in the United States and other countries that have special international skills training programs for law students and lawyers. Winners of Global Legal Skills Awards have come from around the world.

== Past conferences ==
- GLS-1 Chicago, USA 7–8 May 2005 | John Marshall Law School
- GLS-2 Chicago, USA 4–5 May 2007 | John Marshall Law School
- GLS-3 Monterrey, Mexico 28 February – 1 March 2008 | Facultad Libre de Derecho de Monterrey (Mexico)
- GLS-4 Washington D.C., USA 4–6 June 2009 | Georgetown University Law Center
- GLS-5 Monterrey, Mexico 25–27 February 2010 | Facultad Libre de Derecho de Monterrey (Mexico)
- GLS-6 Chicago, USA 5–7 May 2011 | The John Marshall Law School
- GLS-7 San José, Costa Rica 12–14 March 2012 | Universidad de Costa Rica
- GLS-8 San José, Costa Rica 11–13 March 2013
- GLS-9 Verona, Italy 21–23 May 2014 | Università degli studi di Verona Dipartimento di Scienze Giuridiche (Italy) and The John Marshall Law School
- GLS-10 Chicago, USA 20–22 May 2015 | The John Marshall Law School, Northwestern University School of Law, and the Facultad Libre de Derecho de Monterrey (Mexico)
- GLS-11 Verona, Italy 24–26 May 2016 | Università degli studi di Verona Dipartimento di Scienze Giuridiche (Italy) and The John Marshall Law School.
- GLS-12 Monterrey, Mexico, 15–17 March 2017 | Facultad Libre de Derecho de Monterrey (Mexico), in cooperation with The John Marshall Law School, the University of Texas at Austin School of Law, and the Instituto Tecnologico Autonomo de Mexico ITAM Law Department (Mexico).
- GLS-13 Melbourne, Australia 10-12 December 2018 | Melbourne Law School, Melbourne University
- GLS-14 Phoenix, USA 12-14 December 2019 | Sandra Day O'Connor College of Law, Arizona State University
- GLS-15 Nottingham, UK 30 July - 1 August 2023 | Nottingham Law School, Nottingham Trent University
- GLS-16 Bari, Italy 4-6 June 2024 | University of Bari Aldo Moro
- GLS-17 Brno, Czechia 28-30 May 2025 | Masaryk University, Faculty of Law
- GLS-18 Monterrey, Mexico 2-4 December 2026 | Facultad Libre de Derecho de Monterrey
