= Annette Clark =

American academic administrator

Dr. Annette Clark

9th

Dean of the Seattle University School of Law
- Incumbent
- Assumed office July 2013

Dean of Saint Louis University School of Law

Personal details
- Born: Washington, United States
- Education: Washington State University (BS); University of Washington; Seattle University (JD).
- Occupation: Dean, Law Professor

Annette Clark is an American academic administrator and law professor. She served as dean of the Seattle University School of Law and left the position in 2022. Her research interests include bioethics and the law, civil procedure, and medical malpractice.

== Biography ==
Clark received a BS from Washington State University in 1980, an MD from the University of Washington School of Medicine in 1985, and a JD from Seattle University School of Law in 1989, graduating first in her class. While in law school, she clerked for United States Circuit Judge Eugene A. Wright. She joined the law faculty at Seattle University in 1989 as an assistant law professor.

Although she completed an MD degree and completed the "intellectual aspect of medicine," Clark struggled with the practical aspect of the actual practice of medicine. Thus, she did not become a medical doctor, as has been previously claimed. Instead, she became a law professor at the same law school where she obtained her JD degree—a position she held for the majority of her career—and later the dean of this law school.

Clark was the dean of Saint Louis University School of Law from 2011 to 2012 before becoming the dean of Seattle University School of Law in 2013. Clark left Saint Louis University School of Law after a dispute with the school's leadership.

== Publications ==
=== Books ===
- Consent to Health Care, coauthored with Ann Nakamoto & Barbara Shickich, (Washington Health Law Manual 2nd ed., 2006).
- Decision Making for Incompetent Patients, in Washington Health Law Manual, (Washington Society of Hospital Attorneys, 1996).
