= University of Illinois Chicago School of Law =

Public law school in Chicago, Illinois, US

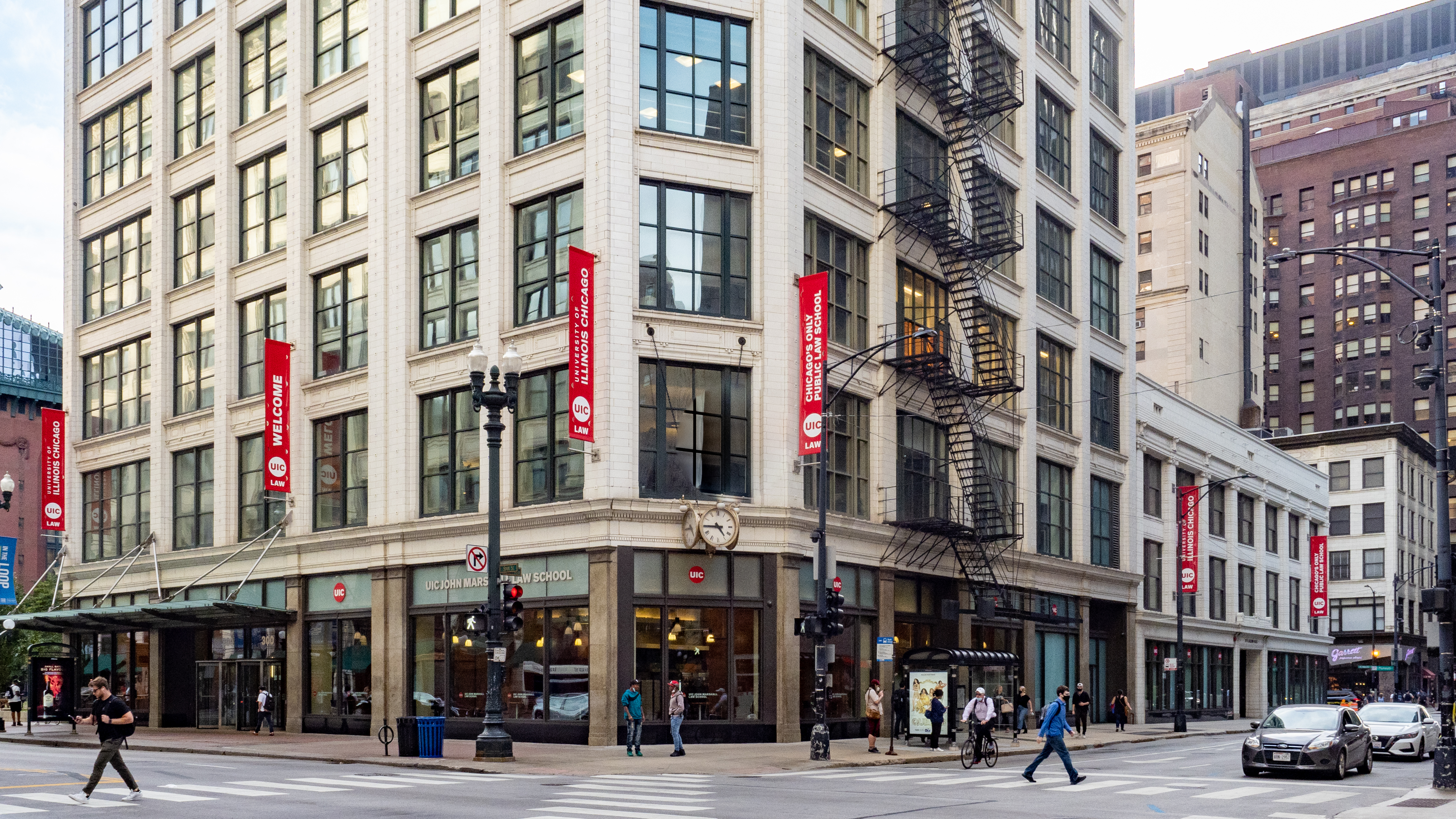
- Parent school: University of Illinois Chicago
- Established: 1899; 127 years ago
- School type: Public law school
- Dean: Nicky Boothe
- Location: Chicago, Illinois, United States; 41.8778°N 87.6284°W
- Enrollment: 987 (Fall 2023)
- Faculty: 48 full-time; 140 part-time (fall 2022)
- USNWR ranking: 167th (tie) (2026)
- Bar pass rate: 59.19% (2023; first-time takers)
- Website: law.uic.edu
- ABA profile: Standard 509 Report

The University of Illinois Chicago School of Law (UIC Law) is the law school of the University of Illinois Chicago, a public research university in Chicago, Illinois. Founded in 1899, it became affiliated with the university in 2019. The school offers programs for both part-time and full-time students, with both day and night classes available, and offers January enrollment.

== History ==
UIC Law was founded in 1899 as the John Marshall Law School and initially accredited by the American Bar Association in 1951. It merged with the University of Illinois at Chicago in 2019, becoming the University of Illinois Chicago John Marshall Law School. On May 20, 2021, following review by a university task force, the school announced its official change of name to University of Illinois Chicago School of Law, effective July 1. The board of trustees acknowledged that "newly discovered research", uncovered by historian Paul Finkelman, had revealed that influential 19th century U.S. Supreme Court chief justice John Marshall was a slave trader and owner who practiced "pro-slavery jurisprudence", which was deemed inappropriate for the school's namesake.

UIC Law is located in Chicago's central financial and legal district, most commonly known as The Loop. It is across the street from the Dirksen Federal Building, which houses the U.S. Court of Appeals for the Seventh Circuit and the U.S. District Court for the Northern District of Illinois, and about four blocks from the Daley Center, which houses the Circuit Court of Cook County and the Bilandic Building site of the Illinois Appellate Court (First District). The Chicago Bar Association is next door to the law school.

== Admissions and costs ==
For the class entering in 2023, UIC Law accepted 69.53% of applicants, with 27.96% of those accepted enrolling. The average enrollee had a 152 LSAT score and 3.39 undergraduate GPA. Tuition and fees at UIC Law for the 2020-2021 academic year is $39,014 for Illinois residents and $48,014 for out of state residents.

== Academics ==
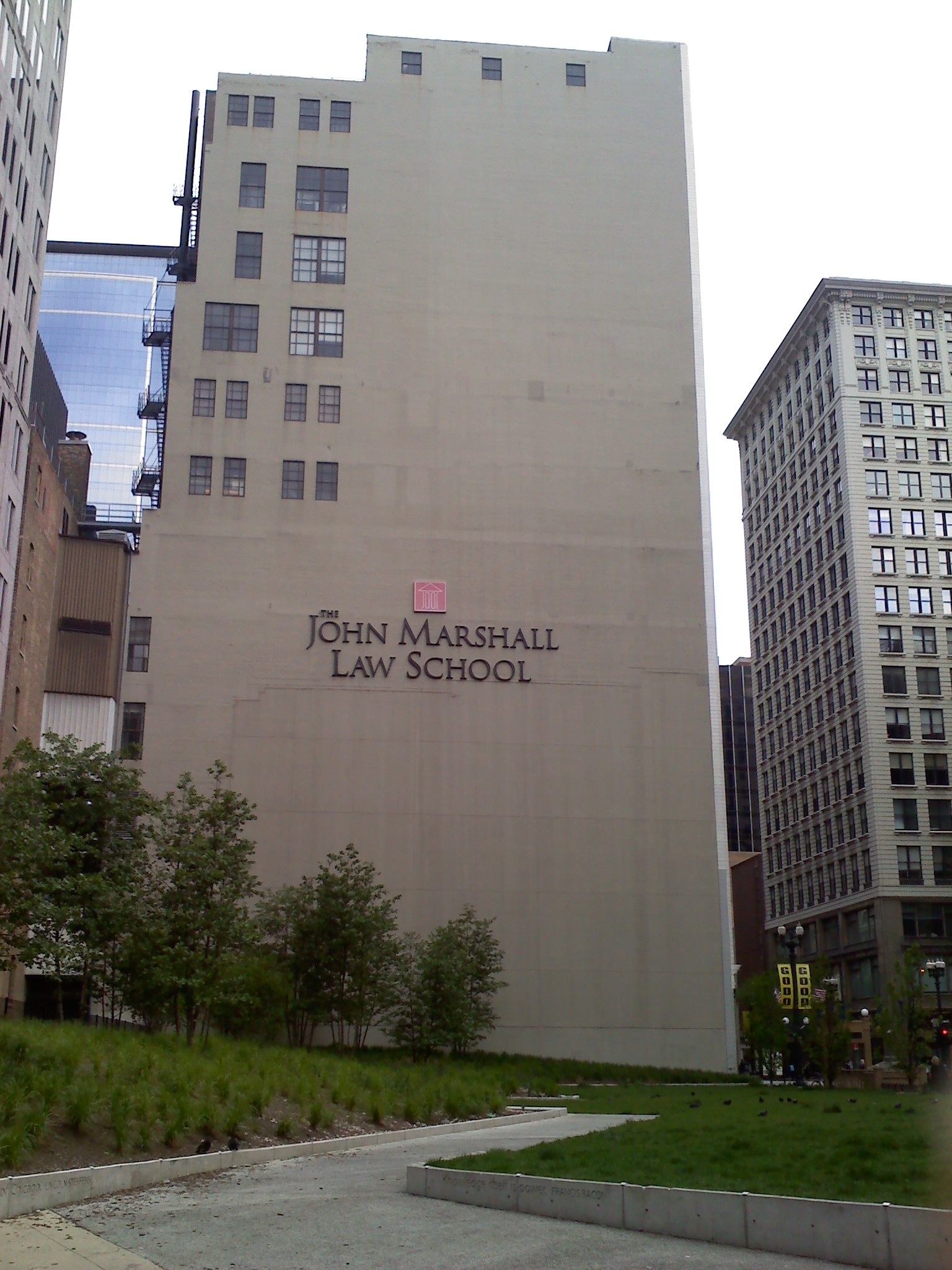
The former name, John Marshall Law School

=== Curriculum ===
UIC Law has day and evening divisions, with identical instruction, course content, and scholastic requirements. Lawyering Skills courses, which focus on writing, research, and oral argument, are an integral part of the core curriculum. These courses are taught in small groups, to maximize the individual attention given to each student. A student may earn a J.D. certificate in a certain area of the law or focus more emphatically and earn a joint degree (J.D./LL.M.).

The law school also offers Master of Laws (LL.M.) and Master of Jurisprudence (M.J.) programs for practicing attorneys and non-attorney professionals and other individual students.

UIC School of Law offers seven Master of Laws (LL.M.) programs for attorneys seeking specialized education in legal issues and for current J.D. students who would like the maximum concentration in particular areas of the law. UIC Law offers a comprehensive curriculum in the following areas: Employee Benefits Law, Estate Planning, Information Technology and Privacy Law, Intellectual Property Law, International Business and Trade Law, Real Estate Law, and Tax Law.

=== Journals and organizations ===
There are four honors programs: UIC Law Review, UIC Review of Intellectual Property Law ("RIPL"), the Moot Court Honors Program, and the Trial Advocacy & Dispute Resolution Honors Program. UIC Law sends teams to more than 30 moot court and mock trial competitions annually.

The student community at UIC Law includes more than 50 student organizations engaging in social awareness, community service, legal discussions, and social activities.

=== Clinics ===
UIC Law students are required to earn three experiential learning credits – working in a clinic, externship, or a combination of both – in order to graduate. The law school offers students practical opportunities through its seven Community Legal Clinics and more than 50 externship placement sites. Clinics include the Community Enterprise & Solidarity Economy Clinic, Fair Housing Legal Support Center & Clinic, International Human Rights Clinic, USPTO-certified IP Patent Clinic, USPTO-certified IP Trademark Clinic, Pro Bono Litigation Clinic, and the Veterans Legal Clinic. Externship opportunities include judicial, governmental, and non-profit placements, as well as a Semester-in-Practice program that allows JD students to earn a semester of credit hours immersed in a legal market outside of Chicago.

=== Global Legal Skills Conference Series ===
The Global Legal Skills Conference Series was founded in 2005 as a forum for professors who teach Legal English and international legal skills to exchange information on teaching techniques and materials. The conference connects legal writing professionals and other professors who have an interest in teaching international students and lawyers who speak English as a second language. Since its inception, the Global Legal Skills Conference has been held four times in Chicago, once in Washington, D.C., twice in Mexico, twice in Costa Rica, and twice in Italy. The conference now also includes presentations of GLS Awards for individual achievement, institutional vision, and outstanding publications.

== Library ==
The Louis L. Biro Law Library occupies the 6th – 10th floors of the law school's State Street building. A team of professional librarians and staff members work to serve the students during the 96 hours/week that the library is open. The library holds over 263,003 volumes and microform equivalents and provides on-campus and remote access to some of those titles via their specialty electronic databases. It is continually adding more online subscriptions to its growing collection of electronic resources, including Lexis, Westlaw, CALI Lessons, BNA Premier, IICLE SmartBooks, Max Planck Encyclopedia of Public International Law Online, Justis International Law Reports, Courtroom View Network, which contains audio versions of law school casebooks and streaming trial videos, and Mango languages, an easy to follow system for learning over 20 different languages.

Students have wireless access throughout the law school and the library offers seating for 750, including twelve group study rooms. In addition to supporting the research & instructional needs of the students, faculty & staff of the law school, the library is also open to law school alumni and members of the Chicago Bar Association, whose headquarters building is next door.

== Bar examination passage ==
In 2023, the overall bar examination passage rate for the law school's first-time examination takers was 59.19%. The average first-time pass rate for ABA accredited schools was 78.14%. The Ultimate Bar Pass Rate for the school, which the ABA defines as the passage rate for graduates who sat for bar examinations within two years of graduating, was 80.51% for the class of 2021.

== Employment ==
According to the school's official ABA-required disclosures for 2023 graduates, within 10 months after graduation 196 (67.59%) of the 290-member graduating class were employed in full-time positions requiring bar passage (i.e. as attorneys) and 17 (5.86%) were employed in full-time JD advantage positions. Attorney positions were in various size law firms, most in 1–10-attorney firms but some in firms exceeding 500 attorneys; 10 graduates obtained local or state judicial clerkships and four obtained federal clerkships. Seventy-five of the class were otherwise employed in public interest, government, higher education, or business. Seventy-two members (24.83%) were unemployed or employed short–term or part–time.

== Rankings and reputation ==
In the 2026 U.S. News & World Report ranking, the school was ranked 167th in the country out of 196 schools.
