= Seattle Journal for Social Justice =

- Discipline: Legal studies
- Language: English

Publication details
- History: 2001-present
- Publisher: Seattle University School of Law (United States)
- Frequency: Triannually

Standard abbreviations
- ISO 4: Seattle J. Soc. Justice

Indexing
- ISSN: 1544-1245

Links
- Journal homepage; Online access

The Seattle Journal for Social Justice is a peer-reviewed student-edited law journal of the Seattle University School of Law. Among specialized law reviews, it is currently ranked 395th out of more than 1,200 law journals.

The journal publishes two to three issues per year—Fall/Winter, Spring, and Summer. Each issue typically includes three or four articles concerning social justice issues written by outside authors, as well as two to three student-written articles. The journal has published issues with articles on wide-ranging social justice themes such as civil liberties after September 11, the resistors of Japanese-American internment, same-sex marriage, and race and education. It is staffed by second- and third-year law students.

== Notable articles ==
Among the most cited articles published in the journal are:

- Archbishop Desmond Mpilo Tutu, We Can Be Human Only Together, 1 Seattle J. Soc. Just. 253, (2002).
- Susan B. Boyd, Claire F.L. Young, From Same-Sex To No Sex?:Trends Towards Recognition of (Same-Sex) Relationships in Canada, 1 Seattle J. Soc. Just. 757, (2003).
- Natsu Taylor Saito, For 'Our' Security: Who Is An 'American' And What Is Protected By Enhanced Law Enforcement and Intelligence Powers?, 2 Seattle J. Soc. Just. 23 (2003).
- Michael Shank, Social Justice is the Will of the People: An Interview with Noam Chomsky, 3 Seattle J. Soc. Just. 471, (2005)
- Lorraine K. Bannai, Taking the Stand: The Lessons of the Three men who Took the Japanese Internment to Court, 4 Seattle J. Soc. Just. 1, (2005).
- Paula Lustbader, Walk The Talk: Creating Learning Communities To Promote A Pedagogy of Justice, 4 Seattle J. Soc. Just. 613, (2006).
- Avi Brisman, Crime-Environment Relationships and Environmental Justice, 6 Seattle J. Soc. Just. 727 (2008).
