= Cecily Hazelrigg =

American lawyer

Judge of the Washington Court of Appeals for Division I
- Incumbent
- Assumed office January 14, 2019

Personal details
- Born: Washington, U.S.
- Children: 2
- Education: Skagit Valley College (ATA); Western Washington University (BA); Gonzaga University (JD)

Cecily C. Hazelrigg is an American attorney and jurist serving as a judge of the Washington Court of Appeals for Division I. She assumed office on January 14, 2019.

== Early life and education ==
Hazelrigg was born and raised in Northwest Washington. She earned an Associate of Technical Arts degree in paralegal studies from Skagit Valley College, a Bachelor of Arts in American cultural studies from Fairhaven College Western Washington University, and a Juris Doctor from the Gonzaga University School of Law.

== Career ==
Hazelrigg worked as an adjunct instructor at Western Washington University and visiting professor at the Universidad Latina de América in Morelia, Mexico. She later worked as a deputy attorney in the Skagit County Public Defender’s Office. She was elected to the Washington Court of Appeals in 2018 as the representative for the four northern counties of Division One (Skagit, Whatcom, Island, and San Juan).
