= Legal writing =

Pleading in civil and criminal law

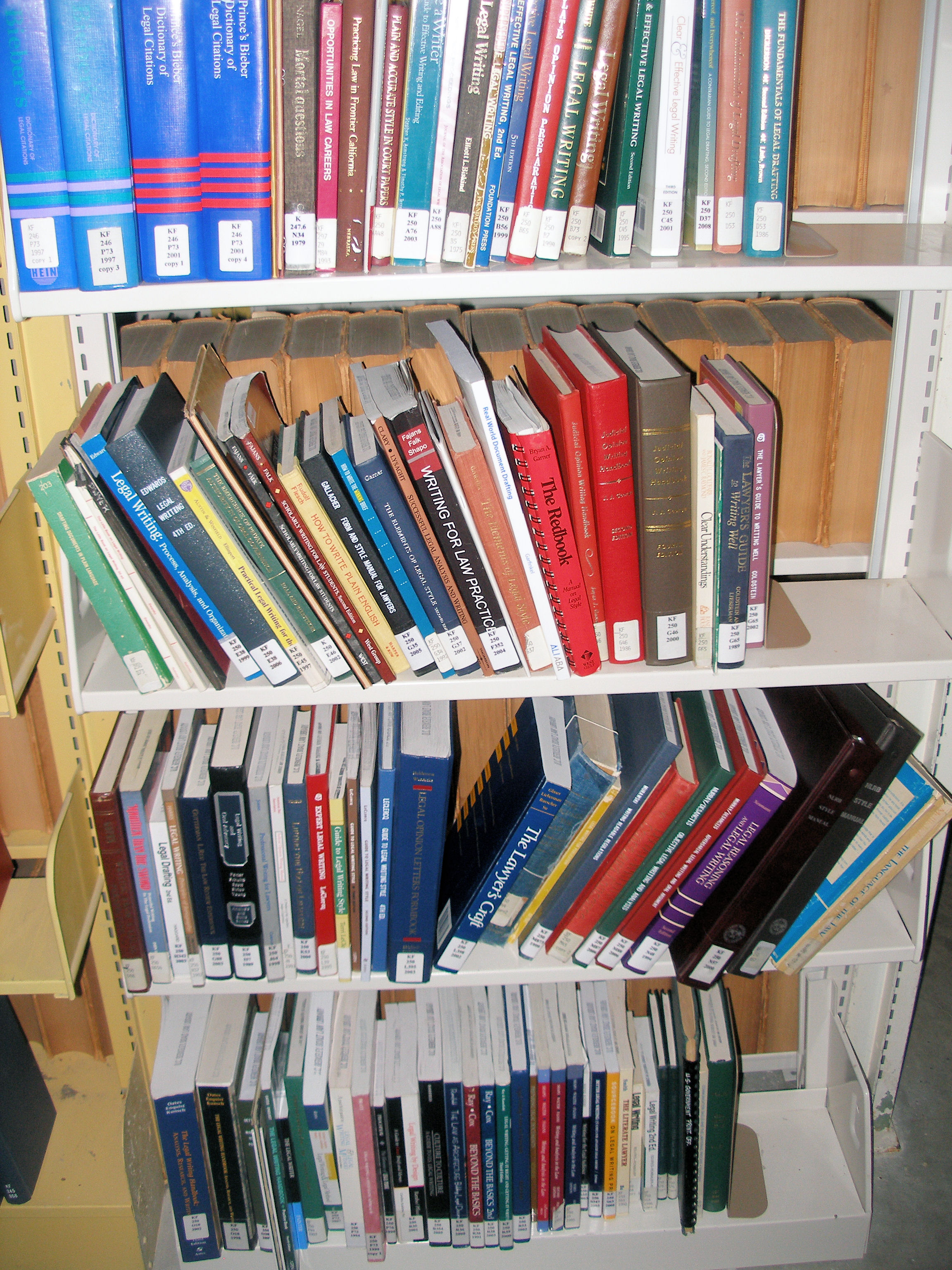
Books on legal writing at a law library

Legal writing involves the analysis of fact patterns and presentation of arguments in documents such as legal memoranda and briefs. One form of legal writing involves drafting a balanced analysis of a legal problem or issue. Another form of legal writing is persuasive, and advocates in favor of a legal position. Another form involves drafting legal instruments, such as contracts and wills.

== Distinguishing features ==
=== Authority ===
Legal writing places heavy reliance on authority. In most legal writing, the writer must back up assertions and statements with citations of authority. This is accomplished by a unique and complicated citation system, unlike that used in any other genre of writing. The standard methods for American legal citation are defined by two competing rule books: the ALWD Citation Manual: A Professional System of Citation and The Bluebook: A Uniform System of Citation. Different methods may be used within the United States and in other nations.

=== Precedent ===
Legal writing values precedent, as distinct from authority. For example, a lawyer who must prepare a contract and who has prepared a similar contract before will often re-use, with limited changes, the old contract for the new occasion. Or a lawyer who has filed a successful motion to dismiss a lawsuit may use the same or a very similar form of motion again in another case, and so on. Many lawyers use and re-use written documents in this way and call these re-usable documents templates or, less commonly, forms.

=== Vocabulary ===
Legal writing extensively uses technical terminology that can be categorized in four ways:

1. Specialized words and phrases unique to law, e.g., tort, fee simple, and novation.
2. Ordinary words having different meanings in law, e.g., action (lawsuit), consideration (support for a promise), execute (to sign to effect), and party (a principal in a lawsuit).
3. Archaic vocabulary: legal writing employs many old words and phrases that were formerly quotidian language, but today exist mostly or only in law, dating from the 16th century; English examples are herein, hereto, hereby, heretofore, herewith, whereby, and wherefore (pronominal adverbs); said and such (as adjectives).
4. Loan words and phrases from other languages: In English, this includes terms derived from French (estoppel, laches, and voir dire) and Latin (certiorari, habeas corpus, prima facie, inter alia, mens rea, sub judice) and are not italicized as English legal language, as would be foreign words in mainstream English writing.

=== Formality ===
These features tend to make legal writing formal. This formality can take the form of long sentences, complex constructions, archaic and hyper-formal vocabulary, and a focus on content to the exclusion of reader needs. Some of this formality in legal writing is necessary and desirable, given the importance of some legal documents and the seriousness of the circumstances in which some legal documents are used. Yet not all formality in legal writing is justified. To the extent that formality produces transparency and precision, it is desirable. To the extent that formality hinders reader comprehension, it is less desirable. In particular, when legal content must be conveyed to nonlawyers, formality should give way to clear communication.

What is crucial in setting the level of formality in any legal document is assessing the needs and expectations of the audience. For example, an appellate brief to the highest court in a jurisdiction calls for a formal style—this shows proper respect for the court and for the legal matter at issue. An interoffice legal memorandum to a supervisor can probably be less formal—though not colloquial—because it is an in-house decision-making tool, not a court document. And an email message to a friend and client, updating the status of a legal matter, is appropriately informal.

Transaction documents—legal drafting—fall on a similar continuum. A 150-page merger agreement between two large corporations, in which both sides are represented by counsel, will be highly formal—and should also be accurate, precise, and airtight (features not always compatible with high formality). A commercial lease for a small company using a small office space will likely be much shorter and will require less complexity, but may still be somewhat formal. But a proxy statement allowing the members of a neighborhood association to designate their voting preferences for the next board meeting ought to be as plain as can be. If informality aids that goal, it is justified.

Many U.S. law schools teach legal writing in a way that acknowledges the technical complexity inherent in law and the justified formality that complexity often requires, but with an emphasis on clarity, simplicity, and directness. Yet many practicing lawyers, busy as they are with deadlines and heavy workloads, often resort to a template-based, outdated, hyperformal writing style in both analytical and transactional documents.

Recently a variety of tools have been produced to allow writers to automate core parts of legal writing. For example, automated tools may be used by transactional lawyers to check certain formalities while writing, and tools exist to help litigators verify citations and quotations to legal authority for motions and briefs.

== Categories ==
Legal writing is of two, broad categories: (i) legal analysis and (ii) legal drafting. Legal analysis is two-fold: (1) predictive analysis, and (2) persuasive analysis. In the United States, in most law schools students must learn legal writing; the courses focus on: (1) predictive analysis, i.e., an outcome-predicting memorandum (positive or negative) of a given action for the attorney's client; and (2) persuasive analysis, e.g., motions and briefs. Although not as widely taught in law schools, legal drafting courses exist; other types of legal writing concentrate upon writing appeals or on interdisciplinary aspects of persuasion.

=== Predictive legal analysis ===
The legal memorandum is the most common type of predictive legal analysis; it may include the client letter or legal opinion. The legal memorandum predicts the outcome of a legal question by analyzing the authorities governing the question and the relevant facts that gave rise to the legal question. It explains and applies the authorities in predicting an outcome, and ends with advice and recommendations. The legal memorandum also serves as record of the research done for a given legal question. Traditionally, and to meet the legal reader's expectations, it is formally organized and written.

=== Persuasive legal analysis ===
The persuasive document, a motion or a brief, attempts to persuade a deciding authority to favorably decide the dispute for the author's client. Motions and briefs are usually submitted to judges, but also to mediators, arbitrators, and others. In addition a persuasive letter may attempt to persuade the dispute's opposing party.

Persuasive writing is the most rhetorically stylized. So although a brief states the legal issues, describes authorities, and applies authorities to the question—as does a memorandum—the brief's application portion is framed as an argument. The author argues for one approach to resolving the legal matter and does not present a neutral analysis.

=== Legal drafting ===
Legal drafting creates binding legal text. It includes enacted law like statutes, rule and regulations; contracts (private and public); personal legal documents like wills and trusts; and public legal documents like notices and instructions. Legal drafting requires no legal authority citation and generally is written without a stylized voice.

== Plagiarism ==
In writing an objective analysis or a persuasive document, including a memorandum or brief, lawyers write under the same plagiarism rules applicable to most other writers, with additional ethical implications for presenting copied materials as original. Legal memoranda and briefs must properly attribute quotations and source authorities; yet, within a law office, a lawyer might borrow from other lawyers' texts without attribution, in using a well-phrased, successful argument made in a previous brief.

Plagiarism is strictly prohibited in academic work, especially in law review articles, seminar papers, and similar writings intended to reflect the author's original thoughts.

The drafting of legal documents such as contracts is different as, unlike in most other legal writing categories, it is common to use language and clauses that are derived from form books, legal opinions and other documents without attribution. Lawyers use forms documents when drafting documents such as contracts, wills, and judgments. The key difference between using phrases or paragraphs from other legal documents, and copying in other contexts or copying the entire document, arises from the fact that lawyers are effectively drawing upon a common pool of clauses that they adjust and modify for their own purposes.

== Plain language movement ==
The Plain Language Movement in legal writing involves an effort to avoid complex language and terminology in legal documents, to make legal writing more understandable and accessible. One of the goals of the movement is to reduce reliance on terms of art, words that have a specific meaning within the context of the law, but that may carry a different meaning in other contexts.

=== Legalese ===
Legalese is an English term first used in 1914 for "legal writing that is very difficult for laymen to read and understand, the implication being that this abstruseness is deliberate for excluding the legally untrained and to justify high fees." Legalese, as a term, has been adopted in other languages. Legalese is characterized by long sentences, many modifying clauses, complex vocabulary, high abstraction, and insensitivity to the layman's need to understand the document's gist. Legalese arises most commonly in legal drafting, yet appears in both types of legal analysis.

Legalese suffers from being less comprehensible to the general public than plain English, which can be important in both private (e.g., contracts) and public matters (e.g., laws, especially in democracies where the populace is seen as both responsible for and subject to the laws).

There is a long history of use of legal terms and definitions, and Legalese may therefore provide a similarly extensive background of precedent tied to its language and phrasing. This may render it particularly resistant to misinterpretation, be it incidental (due to its clarity) or deliberate (due to its precision).

Legal writing faces a trade-off between being as brief and concise as possible, while still covering all possible contingencies. Legalese can be characterized by a shift in priority towards the latter. For example, legalese commonly uses doublets and triplets of words (e.g., "null and void" and "dispute, controversy, or claim") which may appear redundant or unnecessary to laymen, but to a lawyer might reflect an important reference to distinct legal concepts.

Plain-English advocates suggest that no document can possibly cover every contingency, and that lawyers should not attempt to encompass every contingency they can foresee. Rather, lawyers should only draft for the known, possible, reasonably expected contingencies.

== See also ==
- Academese
- Corporate jargon
- Plain English
- Plain language
- Legal Writing Institute
