= Christine Quinn-Brintnall =

American jurist

Christine Quinn-Brintnall (1951 – May 19, 2014) was an American jurist.

Quinn-Brintnall took office in November 2000 after being elected to the Washington State Court of Appeals, Division II, which covers Pierce County and 12 other counties. Between 2004 and 2007, she served as the court's chief judge.

== Election ==
Quinn-Brintnall prevailed in the 2006 primary election against Beth Jenson.

== Cancer diagnosis and retirement ==
In April 2013, the Washington state court system announced Quinn-Brintnall was undergoing treatment for the skin cancer melanoma. In October 2013, Quinn-Brintnall notified Washington Gov. Jay Inslee that she would step down in January 2014. "While I am disappointed that I will not be able to finish my third term, I am confident that the governor will appoint a replacement who will serve the people of Washington well", she explained.

== Professional background ==
Raised in Astoria, Oregon, she lived in Pierce County since 1973. She received a B.A. degree from The Evergreen State College and a Juris Doctor degree from the University of Puget Sound (1980), now Seattle University Law School. At UPS she served on Law Review, was named Outstanding Woman Law Student for two years, and graduated with honors.

Quinn-Brintnall was an experienced trial attorney and appellate attorney. Before being elected to the bench, she worked for 15 years in criminal law and six years in public civil law. She argued many cases before the Court of Appeals and the state Supreme Court, including 97 published cases that set precedent.

While still in law school, Quinn-Brintnall worked for King County, Washington, as a Rule 9 intern on felony prosecutions and appeals. After completing law school, she clerked for Judge James A. Andersen at the Court of Appeals, Division I, and then worked for King County as a deputy prosecuting attorney.

For Pierce County government, Quinn-Brintnall was chief criminal deputy (1983–1986) under prosecuting attorney William Griffies and then senior criminal prosecutor and head of the appeals unit (1986–94) under prosecuting attorney John Ladenburg. In 1994 she moved into the civil division of the Pierce County Prosecuting Attorney's Office. She worked there for six years on a variety of civil topics, including annexations, incorporations, land use, contracts, bankruptcy, elder care, juvenile law, labor law, and privacy issues.

== Community affairs and personal life ==
Active in community affairs, Quinn-Brintnall served on the boards of the Emergency Food Network, Werlin Reading Teams, and Tacoma Youth Symphony. She supported the Christian Brotherhood Academy and serves on its advisory committee. She completed a three-year term on the vestry of St. Matthew Episcopal Church. She had been a volunteer reading tutor in the Tacoma public schools for five years. For relaxation, she played flute and piano.

Quinn-Brintnall had two grown sons, Lincoln and Collin Quinn-Brintnall. Her husband, Matt Temmel, recently retired from his job as a Pierce County performance audit coordinator. His sons are Mark and Dominic Temmel.

== Death ==
Quinn-Brintnall died on May 19, 2014.
