= UIC Review of Intellectual Property Law =

Student-run law review at University of Illinois Chicago School of Law

- Discipline: American law, Technology law, Intellectual property law
- Language: English
- Former name: John Marshall Review of Intellectual Property Law

Standard abbreviations
- Bluebook: UIC Rev. Intell. Prop. L.
- ISO 4: Find out here

Links
- Journal homepage

The UIC Review of Intellectual Property Law (formerly the John Marshall Review of Intellectual Property Law) is a student-run law review covering legal scholarship in the field of intellectual property, established in 2001 at the John Marshall Law School (Chicago). The journal publishes four issues per year, which are available on LexisNexis and Westlaw. Articles in the Journal have been cited by U.S. Courts of Appeals, including the United States Court of Appeals for the Federal Circuit. When JMLS was merged into the University of Illinois Chicago School of Law, the journal was renamed the "UIC Review of Intellectual Property Law." From 2010 to 2024, the UIC IP Review has consistently had one of the highest combined scores for cite count and impact factor among U.S. law journals specializing in intellectual property law.

== Notable contributions ==
- John Paul Stevens (Associate Justice of the U.S. Supreme Court), Section 43(A) of the Shakespeare Canon of Statutory Construction: The Beverly W. Pattishall Inaugural Lecture in Trademark Law, 1 J. Marshall Rev. Intell. Prop. L. 179 (2002).
- Paul Redmond Michel (Chief Judge of the Court of Appeals for the Federal Circuit), Founding a New Journal in the Age of Electronic Law, 1 J. Marshall Rev. Intell. Prop. L. 1 (2001).
- Richard Linn (Circuit Judge of the Court of Appeals for the Federal Circuit), Effective Appellate Practice Before the Federal Circuit, 2 J. Marshall Rev. Intell. Prop. L. 1 (2002).
- Richard Posner (former chief judge of the Seventh Circuit), Transaction Costs and Antitrust Concerns in the Licensing of Intellectual Property, 4 J. Marshall Rev. Intell. Prop. L. 325 (2005).
- Q. Todd Dickinson (former Director of the U.S. Patent and Trademark Office), et al., The Genetic Age: Who Owns the Genome?, 2 J. Marshall Rev. Intell. Prop. L. 6 (2002) (symposium).
- Marybeth Peters (Register of Copyrights), Copyright & Privacy - Through the Legislative Lens, 4 J. Marshall Rev. Intell. Prop. L. 266 (2005).
