= Tessa Dare =

American writer

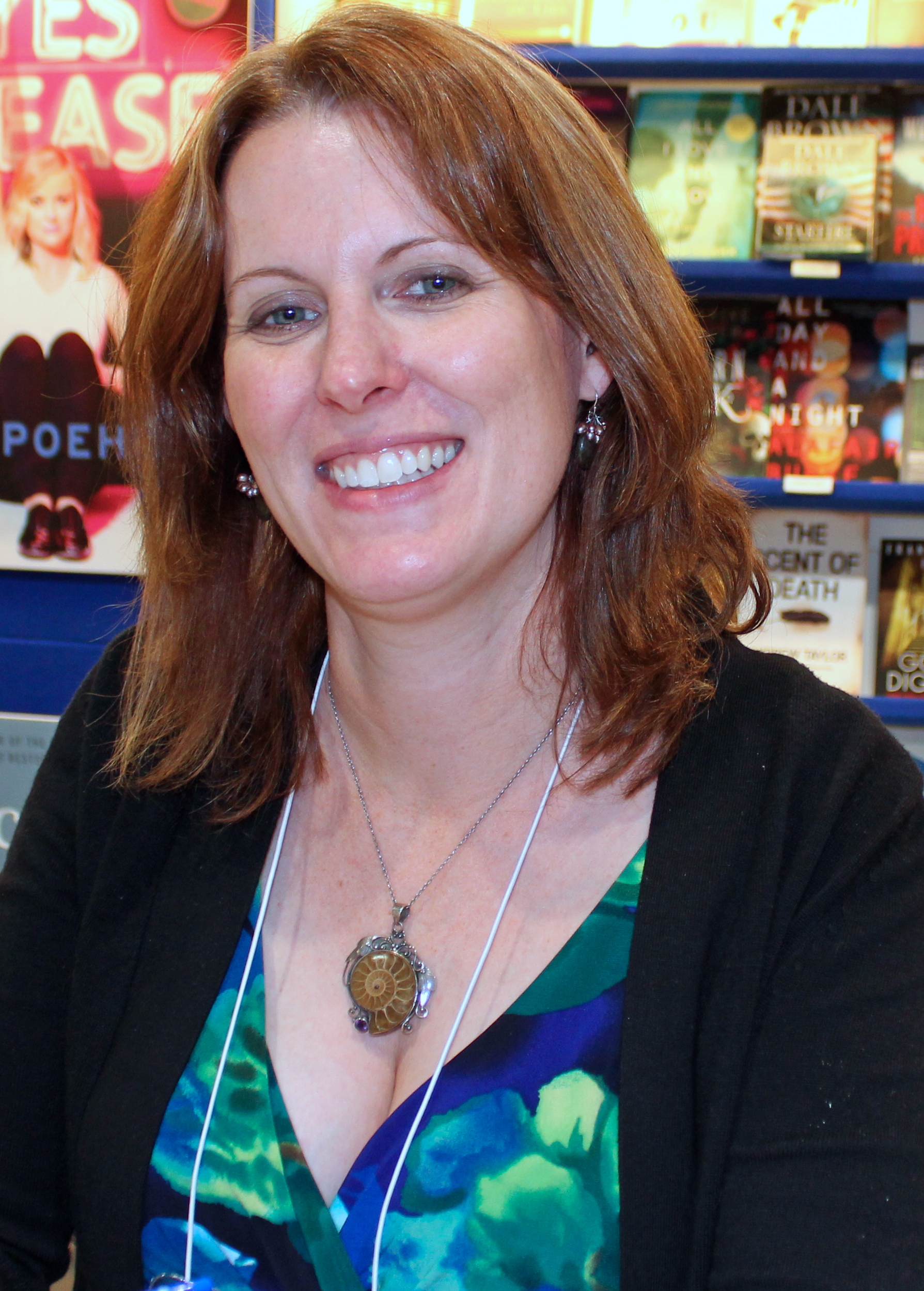
- Dare in 2014
- Occupation: Novelist
- Writing career
- Pen name: Tessa Dare
- Period: 2009–present
- Genre: historical romance
- Notable works: A Night to Surrender, Romancing the Duke
- Notable awards: RITA award – Best Regency Historical Romance; 2012 A Night to Surrender; RITA award – Historical Romance: Short; 2015 Romancing the Duke
- Website: tessadare.com

Tessa Dare is a New York Times and USA Today bestselling American historical romance novelist. She has authored fifteen novels and novellas and created five different series. She has won two Romance Writers of America RITA awards.

== Biography ==
During childhood, her family moved often and books took on an important role for her. She says they became "my refuge, my entertainment, my source of information on all sorts of topics... in a way, they were my home. Whenever I felt lonely or uprooted, opening a familiar book gave me comfort. I would read through dinner, read through classes, read into the wee hours of the night, and, yes, I even read while walking!"

Dare worked as a full-time author and currently resides in Southern California with her husband, two children, and three cats.

== Her writing ==
Her first publicly seen fiction was Jane Austen fan fiction written under the pen name Vangie. Shortly afterward, she entered and won the first Avon FanLit contest and her short story "Forget Me Not" was published as Chapter Four of the HarperCollins e-book, These Wicked Games. It was from this competition that she broke into publishing, along with the other winner, Courtney Milan.

Dare then signed with Ballantine to publish her debut novel, Goddess of the Hunt. In 2011, she switched to Avon with the first book in her Spindle Cove series, A Night to Surrender

When asked why she mixes serious emotion with humor, she tied it back to her first date with her husband. "I ran into a flagpole, face-first. More than a decade later, we're still laughing about it. So the juxtaposition of comic absurdity and deeply felt emotion just seems real to me, because it mirrors my own life."

== Bibliography ==
=== The Wanton Dairymaid Trilogy ===
0.5 "The Legend of the Werestag" (prequel)/ "How to Catch a Wild Viscount" new title
1. Goddess of the Hunt (2009)
2. Surrender of a Siren (2009)
3. A Lady of Persuasion (2009)

=== Stud Club Trilogy ===
1. One Dance with a Duke (2010)
2. Twice Tempted by a Rogue (2010)
3. Three Nights with a Scoundrel (2010)

=== Spindle Cove Series ===
1. A Night to Surrender (2011)
1.5 "Once Upon a Winter's Eve" (2011)
2. A Week to Be Wicked (2012)
3. A Lady by Midnight (2012)
3.5. "Beauty and the Blacksmith"
4. Any Duchess Will Do (2013)
4.5. Lord Dashwood Missed Out (2015)
5. Do You Want to Start a Scandal (2016)
"(Castles Ever After crossover)"

=== Castles Ever After ===
1. Romancing the Duke (February 2014)
2. Say Yes to the Marquess (January 2015)
3. When a Scot Ties the Knot (August 2015)
4. Do You Want to Start a Scandal (Sept 2016)

=== Girl Meets Duke series ===
1. The Duchess Deal (2017)
2. The Governess Game (2018)
3. The Wallflower Wager (2019)
4. The Bride Bet

== Awards and reception ==
Awards for Tessa Dare
Year	Nominated work	Category	Award	Result	Notes	Ref.
2009	Goddess of the Hunt	Best Historical Novels	Romantic Times Reviewers Choice Award	Won		
2010	One Dance with a Duke	Regency-Set Historical Romance	Romantic Times Reviewers Choice Award	Won		
2011	A Night to Surrender	Best Historical Love & Laughter	Romantic Times Reviewers Choice Award	Won		
2012	A Week to Be Wicked	Best Historical Love & Laughter	Romantic Times Reviewers Choice Award	Won		
2012	A Night to Surrender	Regency Historical Romance	Romance Writers of America RITA Award	Won		
2013	Any Duchess Will Do	Best Historical Love & Laughter	Romantic Times Reviewers Choice Award	Won		
2015	Romancing the Duke	Historical Romance: Short	Romance Writers of America RITA Award	Won		
2015	When a Scot Ties the Knot	Romance	Kirkus Best Fiction Books of 2015	Listed		
2015	When a Scot Ties the Knot	Romance	Library Journal Best Books 2015	Listed		
2016	When a Scot Ties the Knot	Romance	RUSA awards Reading List 2016	Shortlisted		
2016	Say Yes to the Marquess	Historical Romance: Short	Romance Writers of America RITA Award	Finalist		

Dare has also received multiple starred reviews in Library Journal, Publishers Weekly, and Booklist. All of her books reviewed at Romantic Times have received a 4 Star or above.

She's made the USA Today bestseller list with multiple titles, including Romancing the Duke, Say Yes to the Marquess, Once Upon a Winter's Eve, A Week To Be Wicked, A Lady By Midnight, Beauty and the Blacksmith, and Any Duchess Will Do.

=== The Wanton Dairymaid Trilogy ===
Her debut novel Goddess of the Hunt garnered much praise, with Romantic Times making it a Top Pick and calling it "a daring debut... From the hilarious opening to the poignant climax, Dare uses wit and wisdom, humor and sensuality to relate a tale of tangled love that reveals her ability to touch hearts with her appealing characters." The same publication went on to name it Best Historical Novel of 2009. Publishers Weekly gave it a starred review and said "Dare seems to have fit all the best of romance into one novel, from sensuous interludes and crafty humor to endearing multidimensional characters." Jane Litte at DearAuthor said "the writing is exquisite" and gave it a B+

=== Spindle Cove series ===
A Lady By Midnight reached #30 in the New York Times bestseller list on September 16, 2012.

A Week To Be Wicked reached #31 in the New York Times bestseller list on April 15, 2012. Publishers Weekly said "Lust, love, and witty repartee are perfectly balanced in this seamlessly plotted romance."

In its review of The Beauty and the Blacksmith, Library Journal said that "The intricacies of village life coupled with a lively group of supporting characters make for an engrossing read."

Kirkus Reviews called Any Duchess Will Do "Great writing and characterization will keep readers engaged and invested. Sly nods to classic and modern Cinderella favorites enhance an already fun, textured plot. Moments of laugh-out-loud humor, emotional intensity and sensual passion woven through an engaging plot and endearing characters make this a great read for romance fans." Whereas Publishers Weekly said "Though hints of Cinderella and Pygmalion aren’t enough to make the premise plausible, Dare more than makes up for that with romance, humor, and intense emotional drama." In 2015, author Beverly Jenkins picked her Top 10 Historical Romances for a column in Publishers Weekly and ranked this novel #2, saying it is "the epitome of what romance is all about." It made Library Journal's Top 10 romance novels of 2013, calling it a "funny, delightfully unexpected tale."

=== Castles Ever After ===
Library Journal said of the first book in this series, Romancing the Duke "Humor, whimsy, and joy overflow as a most unlikely pair find their happy ending in this fairy tale–come–to–life..." Kirkus called it "a unique storyline, a sweet, fun nod to literary fandom, and two main characters who are perfect for each other yet never would have met if they weren't each at a nadir in life’s journey."

When a Scot Ties the Knot received a starred review from Kirkus, which called it "a brilliant, enchanting, and soul-satisfying romance". Publishers Weekly also gave it a starred review, calling it "marvellous" and saying "Dare’s swiftly moving plot is enhanced by the seamlessly developed romance, and the sensuality is heightened by the slow awakening of the unlikely pair’s mutual attraction". Library Journal's starred review said: "With sharp, clever banter, breathtaking sensuality, colorful descriptions, and solid cultural detail, this compelling, often hilarious escapade puts a refreshing spin on the "imaginary lover" theme and adds another winner to Dare's riveting "Castles" series."
