= Legal Writing Institute =

The Legal Writing Institute (LWI) is a nonprofit organization dedicated to improving legal communication, building the discipline of legal writing, and improving the status of legal writing faculty across the United States. The institute currently has almost 3,000 members; while the bulk of the members are law professors, some of the members are judges, attorneys, and undergraduate professors.

== History ==
In 1984, professors Laurel Currie Oates and Chris Rideout used leftover money from an NEH grant to host a conference titled “Teaching Legal Writing.” Although at that time it was difficult to identify those who were teaching legal writing, 108 individuals from 56 different law school attended the conference. As Professor Mary Lawrence has stated, “Those first conferences were extraordinary: intimate, exciting, heartwarming, and exhilarating. Whenever I think of them, I smile. We had a sense of pure joy in being with people who shared common goals and in learning from each other. Together we felt persuaded that legal writing held great promise; we were inspired to keep working in the field. From feeling isolated and unconnected to like-minded professionals, we created a sense of community—a community built on respect, trust, and genuine affection, free of self-promotion and competitiveness. We made friendships at those early conferences, friendships that continue decades later.”^{i}

Because the 1984 conference was so successful, 15 individuals from 14 different law schools decided to establish what is now the Legal Writing Institute at the AALS conference on Legal Writing (held at Chicago-Kent in 1985). The following year, the institute was incorporated as a non-profit organization with its home at the University of Puget Sound in Tacoma, Washington.

== Conferences ==
Since 1984, the institute has sponsored biennial conferences, the most recent ones attracting more than 500 participants. While originally the conferences were held at the University of Puget Sound or its successor, Seattle University, the conferences now rotate among different regions of the county and are held at different law schools or conference sites. The most recent conference was held at Georgetown University Law Center in July 2022 (moved from July 2020 as a result of the COVID-19 pandemic).

The institute also hosts one-day conferences every December and, since 2007, the institute has co-hosted the Applied Legal Storytelling conference, which is held in years in which there is no biennial conference. These conferences have as their focus applied narrative theory and storytelling on behalf of clients

== The Second Draft ==
In 1986, the Institute started a newsletter called The Second Draft, which Professor Laurel Currie Oates herself edited. The Second Draft, which started as a collection of photocopied articles and announcements, is now an online publication sent by email to all Institute members twice a year.

Each issue of The Second Draft collects essays related to a central theme. Past themes have included methodologies for teaching analysis in the classroom, different approaches to commenting on students' writing, and incorporating technology into the legal writing and research classroom.

== Listserv ==
During the 1994 Legal Writing conference, Professor Ralph Brill of Chicago-Kent established a listserv so that those attending the conference could share ideas more easily. Today, the listserv is open to all persons interested in the teaching of Legal Writing and is an extremely active listserv. The listserv address is LWRPROF-L@iupui.edu.

== Legal Writing, the Journal of the Legal Writing Institute ==
In 1998, the Institute established a journal to showcase the developing discipline of legal writing. The Journal's mission is to provide a forum for the publication of scholarly articles about the theory, substance, and pedagogy of legal writing. Unlike most law reviews, which are student-edited, the Journal is peer-reviewed. The editorial board is composed of faculty from law schools across the country and includes some of the leading scholars and academics in the field of legal writing. Although originally called the Journal of the Legal Writing Institute, the Journal is now called Legal Writing, the Journal of the Legal Writing Institute.

== Survey ==
Under the leadership of Professor Jill Ramsfield, in 1990 the Institute developed and sent out the first survey collecting information about Legal Writing programs and staffing. The survey continues to evolve and the information that has been collected has provided institutions with invaluable information about how legal writing is taught at various institutions and about the status of those who teach legal writing.

== Advocacy ==
In 2015, the Institute established the Professional Status Committee and charged it with the task of gathering information about status issues; acting as a resource for Institute members, and assisting Board in addressing status issues and their effect on its members.

In 2015, LWI adopted the following statement:

No justification exists for subordinating one group of law faculty to another based on the nature of the course, the subject matter, or the teaching method. All full-time law faculty should have the opportunity to achieve full citizenship at their institutions, including academic freedom, security of position, and governance rights. Those rights are necessary to ensure that law students and the legal profession benefit from the myriad perspectives and expertise that all faculty bring to the mission of legal education.

Both the Association of Legal Writing Directors (ALWD) and the Society of American Law Teachers (SALT) have also adopted this statement.
