= Washington Court of Appeals =

Appellate court in Washington, US

Court of Appeals of Washington
- Established: May 12, 1969
- Jurisdiction: State of Washington; Counties are divided into one of three geographic appellate divisions
- Location: Division I—Seattle; Division II—Tacoma; Division III—Spokane
- Composition method: Non-partisan election with gubernatorial appointment to vacant seats
- Authorised by: Wash. Const. Art. IV § 30; Wash. Rev. Code Chap. 2.06
- Appeals to: Supreme Court of Washington
- Appeals from: Superior Court of Washington
- Judge term length: Six years
- Number of positions: Division I—12 judges Division II—8 judges Division III—5 judges
- Website: Washington Courts

Chief Judge, Division I
- Currently: Lori K. Smith

Chief Judge, Division II
- Currently: Rebecca Glasgow

Chief Judge, Division III
- Currently: George B. Fearing

Division map

The Washington Court of Appeals is the appellate court for the state of Washington. It hears appellate cases from lower courts, and its decisions may be appealed to the Washington Supreme Court. The Court of Appeals is divided into three divisions: Division I in Seattle, Division II in Tacoma, and Division III in Spokane.

== History ==
As early as 1929, the Washington judiciary observed a need for an intermediate appellate court to relieve the heavy workload of the Washington Supreme Court. That year the state's Judicial Council suggested the establishment of such a court as a possible option for judicial restructuring. Nevertheless, the state legislature took no steps until the mid-1960s, when work began on a Court of Appeals.

The Washington citizenry adopted a Constitutional Amendment on November 5, 1968, which authorized the legislature to create a Court of Appeals and to define its composition and jurisdiction. On May 12, 1969, the legislature passed the enabling act that established a Court of Appeals with three divisions and a total of twelve judges. Governor Dan Evans appointed the initial twelve judges with the judges all facing election at the general election of 1970 and with each elected judge initially serving terms of two, four or six years determined by lot.

== Composition ==
Twenty-two judges currently sit on the Washington Court of Appeals Court, divided into three geographic divisions. Within each division, panels of three judges hear each appeal. The court never sits en banc. Voters elect Court of Appeals judges for six-year terms. Judges on the Court of Appeals, like other Washington jurists, must retire at the end of the calendar year they reach the age of 75.

== Jurisdiction ==
By statute, the court is empowered to hear the following types of cases: 1. As a matter of right, all appeals from final judgments' of the Superior Court, and all other orders that effectively cut-off further litigation, such as condemnation orders, termination of parental rights, juvenile court proceedings, and incompetency proceedings.

- All Personal Restraint Petitions (a statutory variation of the Writ of Habeas Corpus)
- Writs of Mandamus and quo warranto (the Writ of Habeas Corpus is only available in Superior Court)
- Appeals from decisions of administrative agencies.
- Discretionary Review of the Superior Court's decision in an appeal from a court of limited jurisdiction.
- Discretionary Review of interlocutory appeals from rulings of the Superior Court for which there is no other effective remedy.

=== Jurisdiction precluded (vested in the Supreme Court of Washington) ===
- Writs of quo warranto, prohibition, injunction or mandamus that are directed to state officials.
- Cases where the death penalty has been imposed.
- Cases where the validity of all or any part of a statute or tax has been held to violate the state constitution, the US Constitution or federal law.
- Cases involving fundamental and urgent issues of broad public import requiring prompt and ultimate determination.

== Current judges ==
Division	Name	Start	Term End	Law School
1st	Lori Smith, Chief Judge	August 2018	January 2030	Washington
1st	Cecily Hazelrigg, Acting Chief Judge	January 2019	January 2031	Gonzaga
1st	Tam Bui	November 2025	January 2029	Seattle
1st	David Mann	August 2016	January 2027	Lewis and Clark
1st	Bill Bowman	January 2020	January 2027	California Western
1st	Linda Coburn	January 2021	January 2027	Seattle
1st	Janet Chung	March 2022	January 2031	Columbia
1st	Ian Birk	April 2022	January 2029	Washington
1st	Michael Diaz	September 2022	January 2028	Cornell
1st	Leonard Feldman	March 2023	January 2031	Harvard
1st	Masako Kanazawa, Commissioner	–	–	Seattle
1st	Jennifer Koh, Commissioner	–	–	Yale
2nd	Rebecca Glasgow, Chief Judge	January 2018	January 2031	Washington
2nd	Anne Cruser, Acting Chief Judge	March 2019	January 2029	Willamette
2nd	Bradley Maxa	July 2013	January 2029	William and Mary
2nd	Linda Lee	January 2014	January 2031	Hawaii
2nd	Bernard Veljacic	December 2020	January 2031	Seattle
2nd	Erik Price	2021	January 2027	Washington
2nd	Meng Li Che	December 2022	January 2027	Seattle
2nd	Aurora Bearse, Commissioner	–	–	Rutgers
2nd	Karl Triebel, Commissioner	–	–	Chapman
3rd	George Fearing, Chief Judge	June 2013	January 2029	Washington
3rd	Robert Lawerence-Berrey, Acting Chief Judge	March 2014	January 2031	Willamette
3rd	Tracy Staab	January 2021	January 2027	Seattle
3rd	Megan Murphy	January 2025	January 2027	Colorado
3rd	Vacant	January 2026	January 2027	
3rd	Erin Geske, Commissioner	–	–	Lewis and Clark
3rd	Hailey Landrus, Commissioner	–	–	Seattle

=== Vacancies and pending nomination ===
Vacator	Reason	Vacancy Date	Nominee	Nomination Date
Tyson Hill	Retirement	January 2026	TBD	Pending

== Divisions ==
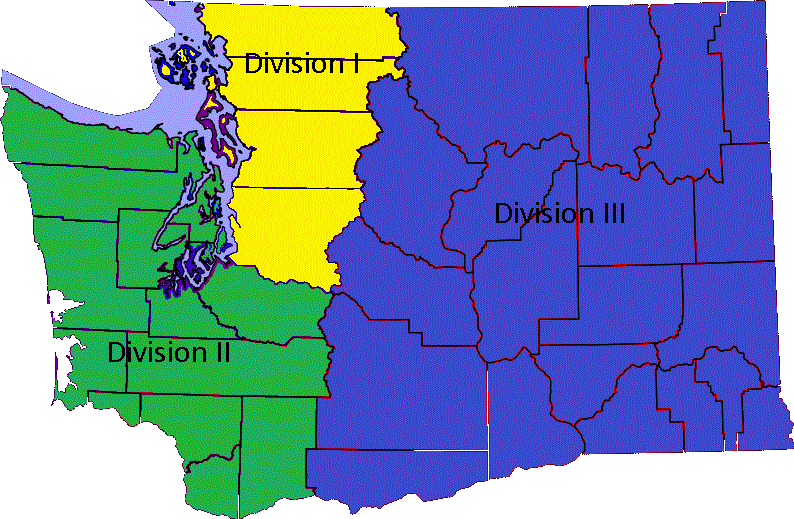
A map showing the three divisions of the Court of Appeals of the State of Washington

=== Division I ===
Division I sits in Seattle, and is the smallest of the three geographic divisions, though the largest by population. It stretches from the White River (to the extent it serves at part of King county's southern boundary) in the south to the Canada–US border in the north, and from the Cascade Range in the east to the San Juan Islands in the west. The division hears appeals from Island, King, San Juan, Skagit, Snohomish and Whatcom.

=== Division II ===
Division II sits in Tacoma and hears appeals from the counties of Clallam, Clark, Cowlitz, Grays Harbor, Jefferson, Kitsap, Lewis, Mason, Pacific, Pierce, Skamania (see note, infra.), Thurston and Wahkiakum.

=== Division III ===
Division III sits in Spokane and includes the three-fifths of the state's land area that lies east of the Cascade Range. In addition to the state's second largest city, Spokane; it embraces the regional cities of Yakima and the Tri-Cities of Kennewick, Pasco, and Richland. It hears appeals from Adams, Asotin, Benton, Chelan, Columbia, Douglas, Ferry, Franklin, Garfield, Grant, Kittitas, Klickitat (see note, infra.), Lincoln, Okanigan, Pend Oreille, Spokane, Stevens, Walla Walla, Whitman and Yakima counties.

=== Other areas ===
Skamania County is in Division II; Klickitat County is in Division III. These counties are sparsely populated, so do not qualify for their own Superior Court judge. They must share one Superior Court Judge. When the judge presides in Skamania County, Division II opinions are followed. When the judge presides in Klickitat County, Division III opinions are followed. When the Divisions issue conflicting opinions, practitioners must be careful to follow/cite from the appropriate appellate division.
