= Courts of Texas =

Courts of Texas include:

State courts of Texas

- Texas Supreme Court (Civil)
- Texas Court of Criminal Appeals (Criminal)
  - Texas Courts of Appeals (14 districts)
    - Texas District Courts (420 districts)
    - Texas Business Court
    - Texas County Courts
      - Texas Justice Courts
      - Texas Municipal Courts

Federal courts located in Texas

- United States District Court for the Eastern District of Texas
- United States District Court for the Northern District of Texas
- United States District Court for the Southern District of Texas
- United States District Court for the Western District of Texas

Former federal courts of Texas

- United States District Court for the District of Texas (extinct, subdivided)

== See also ==
- Judiciary of Texas
