= 2026 Texas's 15th Court of Appeals district election =

Judicial Election

- November 3, 2026

3 of 3 seats on the Fifteenth Court of Appeals of Texas. 2 seats needed for a majority
| | First party | Second party |
|---|---|---|
| Party | Democratic | Republican |
| Seats before | 0 | 3 |
| Seats won | 3 | 0 |
| Seat change | ▲3 | ▼3 |

The 2026 Texas's 15th Court of Appeals district election was held on November 3, 2026, to elect all three justices to the Fifteenth Court of Appeals of Texas. Primary elections were held on March 3.

== Background ==
The Fifteenth Court of Appeals of Texas was created in 2023 to oversee appeals involving the state, challenges to the constitutionality of state laws and cases from business courts. All of the current justices were appointed by Governor Greg Abbott in 2024. This is the first time that the seats on this court have been up for election. The court will ultimately expand to five justices.

== Chief Justice ==
2026 Fifteenth Court of Appeals of Texas Chief Justice election
- November 3, 2026

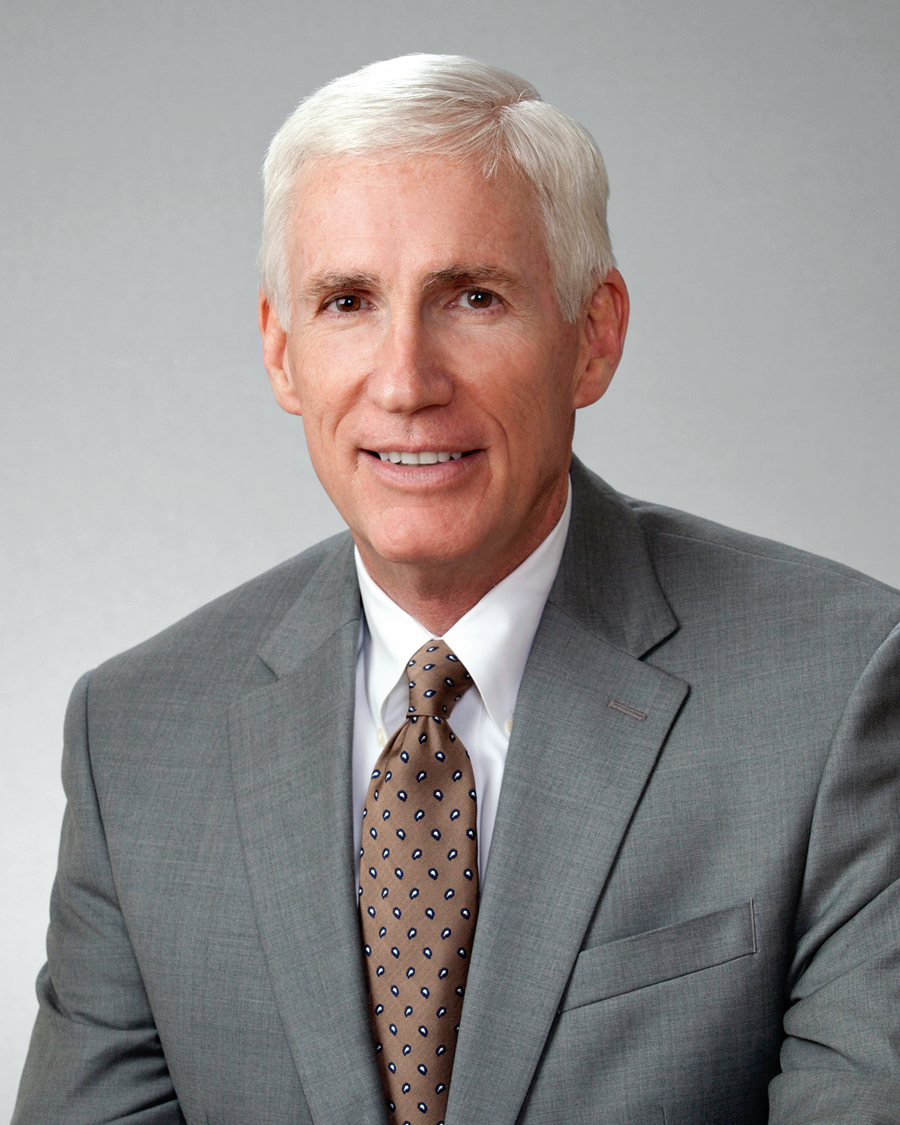
| Nominee | Jerry Zimmerer | Scott Brister |
| Party | Democratic | Republican |
- County results Zimmerer: 50–60% 60–70% 70–80% Brister: 50–60% 60–70% 70–80% 80–90% >90%
Chief Justice before election
Scott Brister
Republican
Elected Chief Justice
Jerry Zimmerer
Democratic

=== Republican primary ===
==== Candidates ====
===== Nominee =====
- Scott Brister, incumbent chief justice and former Justice of the Texas Supreme Court (2003–2009)

==== Endorsements ====
Scott Brister (R)

Statewide officials

- Greg Abbott, governor of Texas (2015–present)

State legislators

- Pat Curry, HD-56 (2024–present)

Organizations

- Texas Alliance for Life

==== Results ====
Republican primary
| Party | Candidate | Votes | % |
|---|---|---|---|
| Republican | Scott Brister (incumbent) | 1,680,736 | 100.0 |
| Total votes | | 1,680,736 | 100.0 |

=== Democratic primary ===
==== Candidates ====
===== Nominee =====
- Jerry Zimmerer, former justice of the Fourteenth Court of Appeals of Texas (2019–2024)

==== Results ====
Democratic primary
| Party | Candidate | Votes | % |
|---|---|---|---|
| Democratic | Jerry Zimmerer | 1,842,128 | 100.0 |
| Total votes | | 1,842,128 | 100.0 |

=== General election ===
==== Results ====
2026 Fifteenth Court of Appeals of Texas Court Chief Justice election
| Party | Candidate | Votes | % |
|---|---|---|---|
| Democratic | Jerry Zimmerer | | |
| Republican | Scott Brister (incumbent) | | |
| Total votes | | | 100.0 |

== Place 2 ==
2026 Fifteenth Court of Appeals of Texas Place 2 election
- November 3, 2026

| Nominee | Tom Baker | Scott Field |
| Party | Democratic | Republican |
Justice before election
Scott Field
Republican
Elected Justice
Tom Baker
Democratic

=== Republican primary ===
==== Candidates ====
===== Nominee =====
- Scott Field, incumbent justice and former justice of the Third Court of Appeals of Texas (2013–2018)

==== Endorsements ====
Scott Field (R)

Statewide officials

- Greg Abbott, governor of Texas (2015–present)

Organizations

- Texas Alliance for Life

==== Results ====
Republican primary
| Party | Candidate | Votes | % |
|---|---|---|---|
| Republican | Scott Field | 1,675,400 | 100.0 |
| Total votes | | 1,675,400 | 100.0 |

=== Democratic primary ===
==== Candidates ====
===== Nominee =====
- Tom Baker, former justice of the Third Court of Appeals of Texas (2019–2024)

==== Results ====
Democratic primary
| Party | Candidate | Votes | % |
|---|---|---|---|
| Democratic | Tom Baker | 1,844,100 | 100.0 |
| Total votes | | 1,844,100 | 100.0 |

=== General election ===
==== Results ====
2026 Fifteenth Court of Appeals of Texas Place 2 election
| Party | Candidate | Votes | % |
|---|---|---|---|
| Democratic | Tom Baker | | |
| Republican | Scott Field (incumbent) | | |
| Total votes | | | 100.0 |

== Place 3 ==
2026 Fifteenth Court of Appeals of Texas Place 3 election
- November 3, 2026

| Nominee | Marc Meyer | April Farris |
| Party | Democratic | Republican |
Justice before election
April Farris
Republican
Elected Justice
Marc Meyer
Democratic

=== Republican primary ===
==== Candidates ====
===== Nominee =====
- April Farris, incumbent justice and former justice of the First Court of Appeals of Texas (2021–2024)

==== Endorsements ====
April Farris (R)

Statewide officials

- Greg Abbott, governor of Texas (2015–present)

Organizations

- Texas Oil and Gas Association

==== Results ====
Republican primary
| Party | Candidate | Votes | % |
|---|---|---|---|
| Republican | April Farris (incumbent) | 1,667,917 | 100.0 |
| Total votes | | 1,667,917 | 100.0 |

=== Democratic primary ===
==== Candidates ====
===== Nominee =====
- Marc Meyer, former chair of the Montgomery County Democratic Party and former candidate for Texas's 457th Texas District Court

==== Endorsements ====
Marc Meyer

Organizations

- AFL-CIO Texas

==== Results ====
Democratic primary
| Party | Candidate | Votes | % |
|---|---|---|---|
| Democratic | Marc Meyer | 1,837,419 | 100.0 |
| Total votes | | 1,837,419 | 100.0 |

=== General election ===
==== Results ====
2026 Fifteenth Court of Appeals of Texas Place 3 election
| Party | Candidate | Votes | % |
|---|---|---|---|
| Democratic | Marc Meyer | | |
| Republican | April Farris (incumbent) | | |
| Total votes | | | 100.0 |
