= Craig T. Enoch =

American judge

Craig Trively Enoch

Justice of the Texas Supreme Court
- In office January 1, 1993 – October 1, 2003
- Preceded by: Oscar Mauzy
- Succeeded by: Scott Andrew Brister

Personal details
- Born: April 3, 1950 (age 76)
- Party: Republican
- Spouse: Kathryn Barker Enoch
- Education: Southern Methodist University; Southern Methodist University School of Law; University of Virginia School of Law
- Occupation: Attorney; former Judge

Craig Trively Enoch (born April 3, 1950) is a former justice of the Texas Supreme Court, having served from 1993 until his retirement in 2003.

== Career ==
Before service on the Supreme Court, he was chief justice of the Texas state Fifth District Court of Appeals located in Dallas. Justice Enoch is currently a managing member of Enoch Kever PLLC in Austin, Texas.

== Personal life ==
Enoch is the son of the former Margery Trively and Don Enoch, who served as the mayor of Wichita, Kansas, from 1969 until 1970. He is married to the former Kathryn Barker (born 1951).
