= Texas Business Court =

Civil court

The Texas Business Court is a civil court with a specialized business and commercial subject matter jurisdiction, established by statute in 2023. It was created along with the Fifteenth Court of Appeals, an appellate court of specialized jurisdiction. The Business Court is a distinct statutory court, and not part of the Texas District Court system.

== History ==
On June 9, 2023, Texas governor Greg Abbott signed a law creating trial and appellate level business courts in Texas. The law provides for trial level business courts in 11 geographical regions within the state, with the Clerk of the Business Court located in Austin. The 2023 law also created the first operational appellate level business court in the United States, the Fifteenth Court of Appeals. The new law became effective in September 2023. The two courts became operational in September 2024.

The Texas Supreme Court approved rules of procedure for the new trial level Business Court in June 2024, and Abbott began appointing Business Court division judges that same month. In August 2024, the Texas Supreme Court rejected a constitutional challenge to the appellate business court's creation.

Only five of the 11 Business Court divisions were originally operational (First Business Court Division, in Dallas; Third Business Court Division, in Austin; Fourth Business Court Division, in San Antonio; Eighth Business Court Division, in Fort Worth; and the Eleventh Business Court Division, in Houston).

== Jurisdiction ==
The Business Court's jurisdiction is limited by both case type and the amount of money in dispute between the parties in some types of actions. Its jurisdiction is concurrent with Texas' district courts. Under the original 2023 statute, among other case types included with the Business Court's jurisdiction are disputes of at least $5 million involving corporate governance, derivative actions, internal business disputes among owners, breach of duties by principals to an organization, individual liability for the acts of an organization, securities law, and cases arising out of Texas' Business Organizations code. The Business Court also has concurrent jurisdiction over cases with at least a $10 million amount-in-controversy for disputes involving certain business transactions, certain types of contracts and for specified violations of Texas' Finance Code or Business and Commerce Code. Finally, the Business Court may have jurisdiction involving statutorily listed case types in actions against publicly traded companies, regardless of the amount of money in dispute.

In June 2025, the Texas legislature passed amendments to the Business Court statute expanding the court’s jurisdiction by, among other things, lowering the amount-in-controversy for certain claims, allowing parties to combine related claims to reach the jurisdictional amount-in-controversy minimum, adding intellectual property and trade secrets cases to fall within the court’s purview, and authorizing the Business Court to decide on whether certain cases are subject to arbitration. Abbott signed the Act into law on June 20, to become effective on September 1, 2025.

== Operations ==
The five operational Business Court divisions have two assigned judges each, while the still dormant divisions are only to be assigned a single judge. Business Court judges have a specific set of qualification criteria they must meet; and unlike most judges in Texas, who are elected, Business Court judges are appointed by the Governor on advice and consent of the state senate. Unlike District Court judges, Business Court judges are authorized to hire permanent law clerks or staff attorneys. During its first half-year of operations, breach of contract claims dominated the Business Court dockets in the five divisions.
