= Judiciary of Texas =

State court system

The structure of the judiciary of Texas is laid out in Article 5 of the Constitution of Texas and is further defined by statute, in particular the Texas Government Code and Texas Probate Code. The structure is complex, featuring many layers of courts, numerous instances of overlapping jurisdiction (in terms of territory), several differences between counties, as well as an unusual bifurcated appellate system at the top level found in only one other state: Oklahoma. Municipal Courts are the most active courts, with County Courts and District Courts handling most other cases and often sharing the same courthouse.

Administration is the responsibility of the Supreme Court of Texas, which is aided by the Texas Office of Court Administration, Texas Judicial Council and the State Bar of Texas, which it oversees.

== History and perception ==
In the 19th century, Texas had a reputation for arbitrary "frontier justice"; in one notorious example highlighted by Stanford legal historian Lawrence M. Friedman, its appellate courts upheld a conviction of "guily" (where the t was omitted) in 1879 but reversed a conviction of "guity" (where the l was omitted) in 1886. To Friedman, this proved "that a 't' was less crucial than an 'l' in the law of Texas". As late as the 1870s, about a decade after the American Civil War, there was no functioning legal system in West Texas. The poor quality of the state's judicial system has been attributed to the state's shortage of proper law schools and law libraries in that era, as well as the traditional preference of Texans for "'self-help' justice as practiced in the courts of 'Judge Winchester' or 'Judge Lynch.'"

== Courts ==
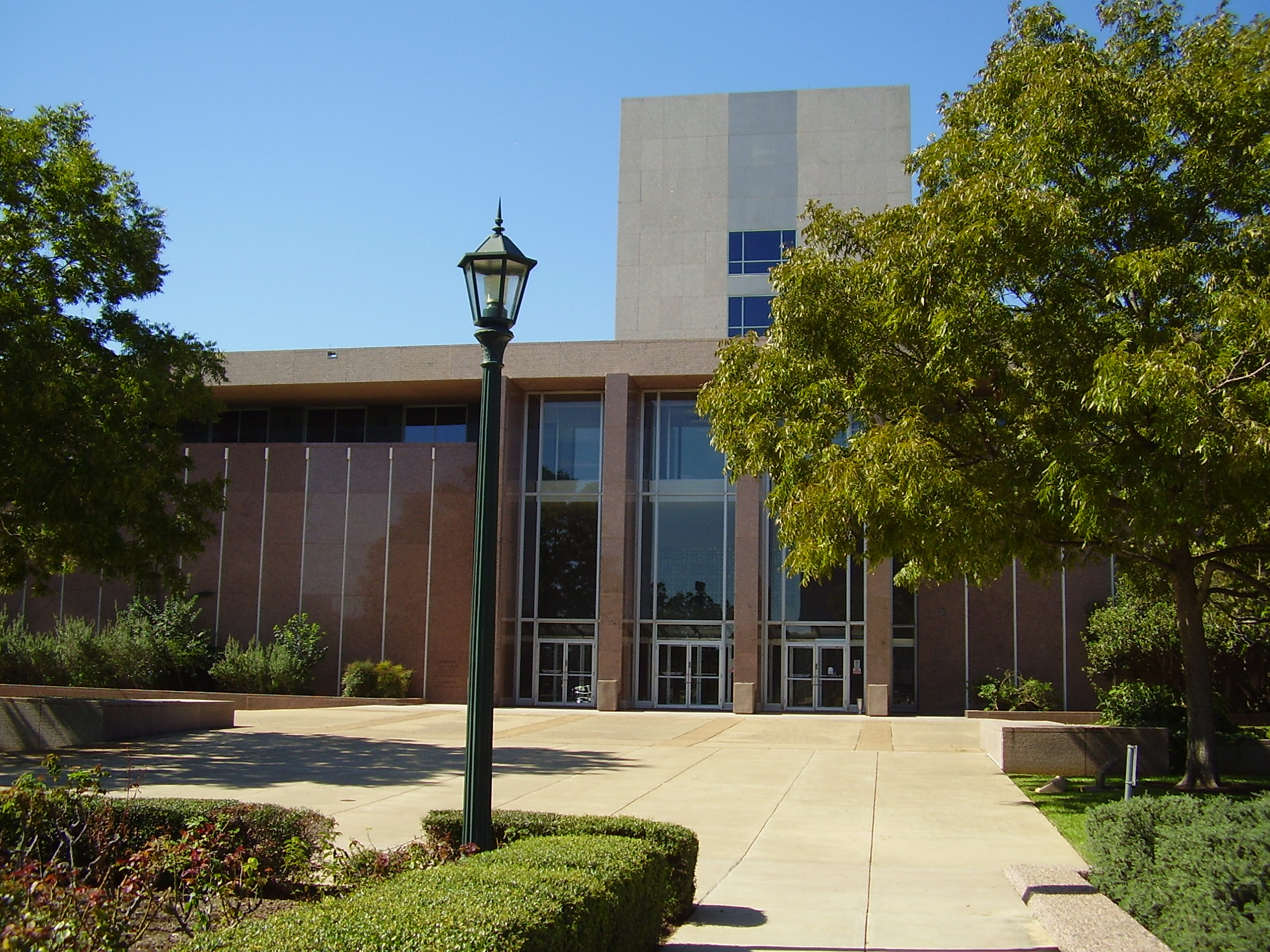
The Texas Supreme Court Building

Texas is the only state besides Oklahoma to have a bifurcated appellate system at the highest level. The Texas Supreme Court hears appeals involving civil matters (which include juvenile cases), and the Texas Court of Criminal Appeals hears appeals involving criminal matters. Sometimes, the dividing line is murky, especially with respect to jurisdiction in mandamus and habeas corpus cases. See, e.g. Justice Willett's dissent in In re Reece, 341 S.W.3d 360 (Tex. 2011) (orig. proceeding). The Texas Supreme Court and the Texas Court of Criminal Appeals are co-equal, unlike in Oklahoma where the Supreme Court is superior to the highest criminal court.

Article V, Section 1, states:

The judicial power of this State shall be vested in one Supreme Court, in one Court of Criminal Appeals, in Courts of Appeals, in District Courts, in County Courts, in Commissioners Courts, in Courts of Justices of the Peace, and in such other courts as may be provided by law. The Legislature may establish such other courts as it may deem necessary and prescribe the jurisdiction and organization thereof, and may conform the jurisdiction of the district and other inferior courts thereto.

Pursuant to this text, the Texas Legislature has created additional courts to address caseload pressures driven by population growth in different areas of the state. District courts are (usually) consecutively numbered regardless of whether they are specialize to handle criminal, civil, or family matters (though in some counties, Criminal District Courts have separate numbering systems, an example being Dallas County which has seven such courts and three Auxiliary Courts). The highest numbers indicate that the court was created recently, but the number alone provides no clue as to location of the new court and the appellate district within which it is located. As of March 2026, there are over 60 courts in Dallas County.

Further sections of Article V spell out the basic requirements for each court's jurisdiction and for its officers.

=== Supreme Court ===
The Supreme Court of Texas hears appeals involving civil matters and does not hear any appeals involving criminal matters except when the defendant is a juvenile. Under Texas law, juvenile proceedings (even those which would be criminal if filed against an adult) are considered civil matters under the Texas Family Code; thus, the Texas Supreme Court hears such appeals, but generally defers to the Texas Court of Criminal Appeals (CCA) in matters where Texas criminal statutes have been interpreted. The Supreme Court also maintains responsibility for attorney licensing and discipline, and plays a more prominent role in promulgation and revision of court rules and in administration of the entire judicial system that does the CCA.

=== Court of Criminal Appeals ===
The Texas Court of Criminal Appeals hears appeals in criminal cases. Cases in which the death penalty was imposed are directly and automatically appealed to this court, bypassing the intermediate Courts of Appeals, which hear both civil and criminal cases.

=== Courts of Appeals ===
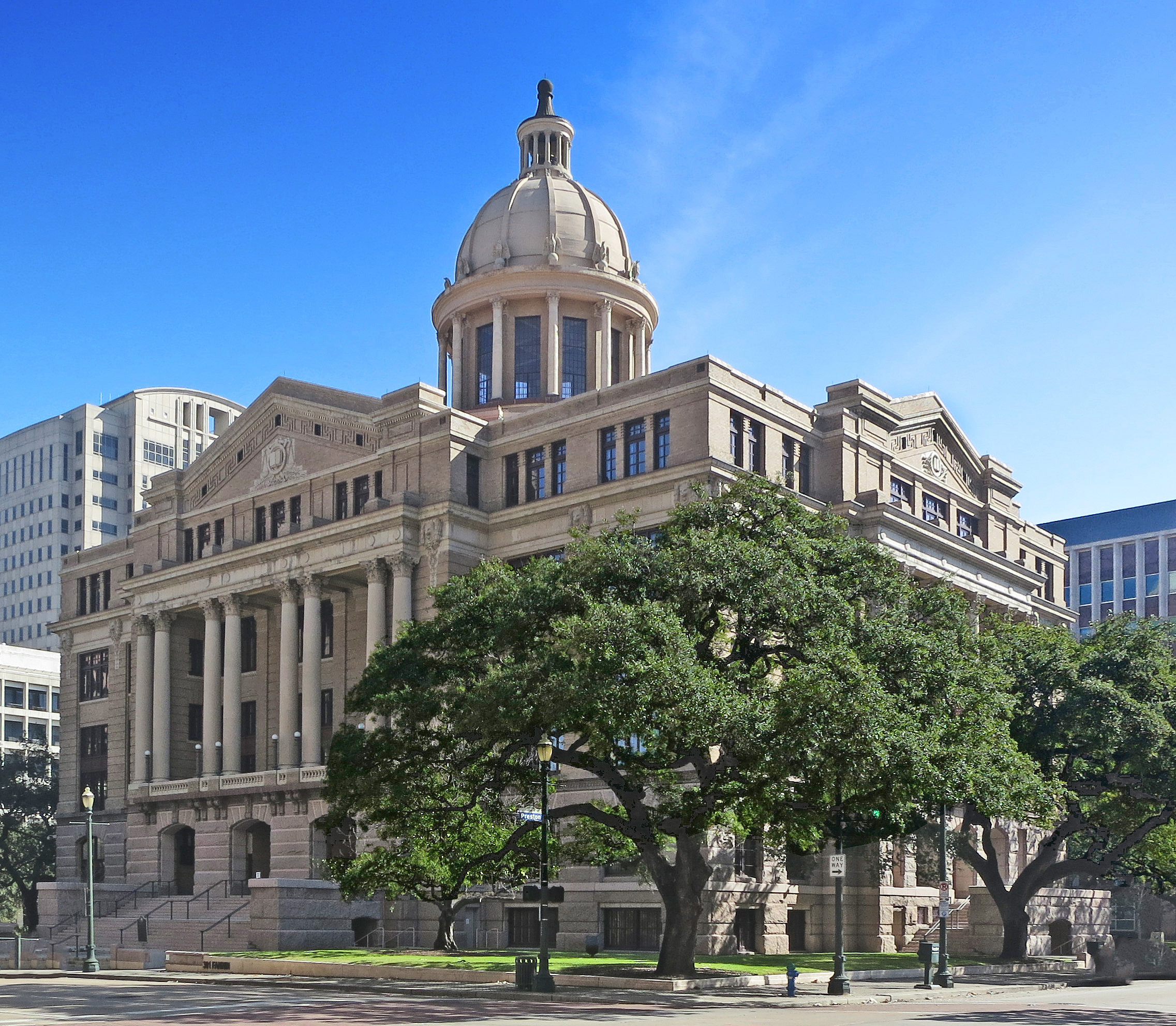
The Old Harris County Courthouse, home of the First Court of Appeals of Texas and Fourteenth Court of Appeals in Houston

Texas has 14 Courts of Appeals, which have intermediate appellate jurisdiction in both civil and criminal cases. Death penalty cases, however, are automatically appealed to the Texas Court of Criminal Appeals and thus skip the intermediate tier in the appellate court hierarchy. The term Court of Appeals (plural) should be capitalized because the generic term would include the two courts of last resorts also.

The total number of intermediate appellate seats is 80, with membership ranging from three to 13 justices per court, as set by statute. All cases are heard by a three-justice panel unless a hearing en banc is ordered (except where a particular court has only three justices assigned to it, in which instance all cases are automatically heard en banc; an example is the 12th Court of Appeals). The en banc process is used to maintain consistency in the court's jurisprudence, to overrule existing precedent that is binding on individual panels, and to set new precedent on an unsettled question of substantive law or procedure.

The Texas Legislature determines which counties are included within a particular court of appeals' district, and has shifted counties between courts to balance the docket. The Texas Supreme Court seeks to even out imbalances in appellate caseloads on an ongoing basis with docket-equalization orders that provide for transfers of batches of cases from the busiest appeals courts to others with spare capacity.

The First and the Fourteenth Courts of Appeal present a peculiarity: both have their seat at the re-purposed historic 1910 Harris County Courthouse in Houston and exercise concurrent jurisdiction over the same ten counties, the largest of which is Harris County. Parties who want to appeal a judgment or other order from a trial court in these counties are required to state in their notice of appeal that they wish to appeal to either the First or the Fourteenth Court of Appeals, and then have to wait for the result of random assignment to one or the other. They also have to disclose any prior appellate history of the same case in either one of the two courts. Both courts are served by the same clerk, currently Christopher Prine, whose office will issue an initial letter with instructions, along with the appellate docket number that will also reveal which court an appellant has drawn. Appeals are governed by the Texas Rules of Appellate Procedure (TRAPs) and the local rules.

An even more bizarre situation occurs in East and North Texas, where the 6th Court has four counties – Gregg, Rusk, Upshur, and Wood – which overlap with the 12th Court, and also has Hunt County overlapping with the 5th Court.

==== List of District Courts of Appeals of Texas ====
Court No.	Counties in District	Seat	Justices
1	Austin, Colorado, Grimes, Washington, Brazoria, Fort Bend, Harris, Chambers, Galveston, Waller	Houston	9
2	Archer, Denton, Montague, Wichita, Clay, Hood, Parker, Wise, Cooke, Jack, Tarrant, Young	Fort Worth	7
3	Bastrop, Bell, Blanco, Burnet, Caldwell, Coke, Comal, Concho, Fayette, Hays, Irion, Lampasas, Lee, Llano, McCulloch, Milam, Mills, Runnels, San Saba, Schleicher, Sterling, Tom Green, Travis, Williamson	Austin	6
4	Atascosa, Gillespie, Kinney, Starr, Bandera, Guadalupe, La Salle, Sutton, Bexar, Jim Hogg, McMullen, Uvalde, Brooks, Jim Wells, Mason, Val Verde, Dimmit, Karnes, Maverick, Webb, Duval, Kendall, Medina, Wilson, Edwards, Kerr, Menard, Zapata, Frio, Kimble, Real, Zavala	San Antonio	7
5	Collin, Grayson, Kaufman, Dallas, Hunt, Rockwall	Dallas	13
6	Bowie, Franklin, Lamar, Rusk, Camp, Gregg, Marion, Titus, Cass, Harrison, Morris, Upshur, Delta, Hopkins, Panola, Wood, Fannin, Hunt, Red River	Texarkana	3
7	Armstrong, Dickens, Hockley, Parmer, Bailey, Donley, Hutchinson, Potter, Briscoe, Floyd, Kent, Randall, Carson, Foard, King, Roberts, Castro, Garza, Lamb, Sherman, Childress, Gray, Lipscomb, Swisher, Cochran, Hale, Lubbock, Terry, Collingsworth, Hall, Lynn, Wheeler, Cottle, Hansford, Moore, Wilbarger, Crosby, Hardeman, Motley, Yoakum, Dallam, Hartley, Ochiltree, Deaf Smith, Hemphill, Oldham	Amarillo	4
8	Andrews, El Paso, Presidio, Ward, Brewster, Hudspeth, Reagan, Winkler, Crane, Jeff Davis, Reeves, Crockett, Loving, Terrell, Culberson, Pecos, Upton	El Paso	3
9	Hardin, Liberty, Orange, Tyler, Jasper, Montgomery, Polk, Jefferson, Newton, San Jacinto	Beaumont	4
10	Bosque, Falls, Leon, Navarro, Brazos, Freestone, Limestone, Robertson, Burleson, Hamilton, McLennan, Somervell, Coryell, Hill, Madison, Walker Ellis, Johnson	Waco	3
11	Baylor, Eastland, Howard, Palo Pinto, Borden, Ector, Jones, Scurry, Brown, Erath, Knox, Shackelford, Callahan, Fisher, Martin, Stephens, Coleman, Gaines, Midland, Stonewall, Comanche, Glasscock, Mitchell, Taylor, Dawson, Haskell, Nolan, Throckmorton	Eastland	4
12	Anderson, Houston, Sabine, Trinity, Angelina, Nacogdoches, San Augustine, Upshur, Cherokee, Rains, Shelby, Van Zandt, Gregg, Rusk, Smith, Wood, Henderson	Tyler	3
13	Aransas, Goliad, Kleberg, Refugio, Bee, Gonzales, Lavaca, San Patricio, Calhoun, Hidalgo, Live Oak, Victoria, Cameron, Jackson, Matagorda, Wharton, De Witt, Kenedy, Nueces, Willacy	Corpus Christi	6
14	Austin, Colorado, Grimes, Washington, Brazoria, Fort Bend, Harris, Chambers, Galveston, Waller	Houston	9

=== District Courts ===
The Texas district courts are the trial courts of general jurisdiction.

The district court has exclusive jurisdiction over felony cases, cases involving title to land, and election contest cases. It shares jurisdiction with the county courts, and in some case justice of the peace courts, for civil cases (its lowest limit for hearing a case is a mere $200 in controversy, while JP courts can hear cases up to $10,000). Family law jurisdiction varies depending on the existence of a county court-at-law; in some counties, the district courts share jurisdiction over divorces, child custody and support matters, adoptions and child welfare cases with county courts at law. Probate jurisdiction varies, depending on the existence of a statutory probate court in the county. In some larger counties, such as Harris County, the district courts are specialized, with designated sets of courts hearing criminal cases, juvenile cases, family matters, and non-family civil cases in four different court houses surrounding the square with the underground jury assembly facility, which suffered severe flood damage in Hurricane Harvey. In the smaller counties, a single district court handles all types of cases. In rural areas, as many as five counties share a single district court; urban counties.

One of the most unusual features of Texas trial courts, including district courts, is the tradition of having only one judge per trial court. Single-judge trial courts were the dominant form of American state trial court organization well into the late 19th century. According to Roscoe Pound, 23 of the 34 states in the Union adhered to that model on the eve of the American Civil War. Accordingly, in 1836, this then-commonplace and familiar model was duly written into the Constitution of the Republic of Texas. Section 2 of Article IV provided for "not less than three nor more than eight" judicial districts, and that "a judge" would be appointed for each district. Similar clauses using the indefinite article to imply one judge per court appeared in all subsequent constitutions. For example, Section 7 of Article V of the 1876 state constitution provided for 26 judicial districts (subject to the right of the Legislature to increase or diminish them), and that "a judge" would be elected for each district. This rigid constitutional language was finally fixed by a constitutional amendment in 1985, but by then, the tradition of one judge per court was thoroughly entrenched.

As a result, instead of adding more judges to existing courts in response to population growth, the Texas Legislature adds more courts. In February 1889, the Legislature tried to constitutionally meet the need for two district court judges in both Dallas and Bexar Counties by dividing each county into two districts, running the district boundary through the middle of the county courthouse, and granting each district court concurrent jurisdiction over the entire county. The Dallas County courthouse burned down on January 7, 1890, and both district courts reopened a month later in temporary rented quarters which were entirely inside of the 44th District. This arrangement was immediately challenged, and in response, the Texas Supreme Court ruled on March 12, 1890 that the state constitution did not prohibit both Dallas County district courts from operating from a shared location inside the same district. This is why today, a typical Texas urban courthouse is home to many single-judge trial courts of concurrent jurisdiction over the same county, each of which is legally organized as a separate court with its own unique name and number. In contrast, in virtually all other U.S. states and the federal government, a trial court can have multiple judges sitting in separate departments who all share coequal authority to act in the name of the same trial court.

Each district court is uniquely numbered on a statewide basis according to its sequence of creation by the Legislature (in other words, the numbers do not reflect the courts' geography). The same is not true of county-level courts, which are numbered sequentially in individual counties.

The first Texas state constitution of 1845 tried to ameliorate the inflexibility of a single-judge trial court model by also authorizing judges to "exchange benches or hold court for each other when they deem it expedient." Relying on this language, the Legislature enacted a variety of procedural laws over the years to get as close as possible to a de facto unified district court in the urban counties that needed multiple district judges, while remaining faithful to the constitutionally mandated structure of single-judge trial courts. However, these procedures are still not as flexible as simply merging all judges in a county into a single district court, and purported failures to properly follow such procedures occasionally result in another basis for appeal.

Large counties typically assign newly filed lawsuits randomly to individual courts to defeat efforts at judge-shopping (a form of forum-shopping), and require re-filed cases involving the same parties to be transferred back to the original randomly-drawn court. Some of these multi-court jurisdictions (e.g., Bexar County/San Antonio) use a centralized docket system, which undercuts the ability to predict which judge will hear a particular motion or try a case, because the assignment of the matter will depend on the availability of judges on a given day. In that system all cases retain their formal assignment to a particular court. The centralized docket system is, at least in principle, more efficient in allocation of judicial resources, and is legally feasible because trial judges in counties with multiple courts are authorized to switch benches and sit for each other. In appeals from such local court systems, the number of the district court provides no clue as to who signed the judgment. The judge must instead be identified by name. Additionally different orders in the same case may have been signed by different judges.

==== List of Judicial District Courts of Texas ====
Court No.	County or Counties Served	Seat
1	Jasper, Newton, Sabine, San Augustine	Jasper
1A	Jasper, Newton, Tyler	Jasper
2	Cherokee	Rusk
3	Anderson, Henderson, Houston	Palestine
4	Rusk	Henderson
5	Bowie, Cass	New Boston
6	Lamar, Red River	Paris
7	Smith	Tyler
8	Delta, Franklin, Hopkins	Sulphur Springs
9	Montgomery	Conroe
10	Galveston	Galveston
11	Harris	Houston
12	Grimes, Madison, Walker	Huntsville
13	Navarro	Corsicana
14	Dallas	Dallas
15	Grayson	Sherman
16	Denton	Denton
17	Tarrant	Fort Worth
18	Johnson, Somervell	Cleburne
19	McLennan	Waco
20	Milam	Cameron
21	Bastrop, Burleson, Lee	Brenham
22	Caldwell, Comal	San Marcos
23	Matagorda, Wharton	Wharton
24	Calhoun, De Witt, Goliad, Jackson, Refugio	Victoria
25	Colorado, Gonzales, Guadalupe	Seguin
26	Williamson	Georgetown
27	Bell, Lampasas	Belton
28	Nueces	Corpus Christi
29	Palo Pinto	Palo Pinto
30	Wichita	Wichita Falls
31	Gray, Hemphill, Lipscomb	Wheeler
32	Fisher, Mitchell, Nolan	Sweetwater
33	Blanco, Burnet, Llano	Burnet
34	El Paso	El Paso
35	Brown, Mills	Brownwood
36	Aransas, Bee, Live Oak	Sinton
37	Bexar	San Antonio
38	Real, Uvalde	Uvalde
39	Haskell, Kent, Stonewall	Haskell
40	Ellis	Waxahachie
41	El Paso	El Paso
42	Callahan, Coleman, Taylor	Abilene
43	Parker	Weatherford
44	Dallas	Dallas
45	Bexar	San Antonio
46	Foard, Hardeman, Wilbarger	Vernon
47	Armstrong, Potter, Randall	Canyon
48	Tarrant	Fort Worth
49	Webb, Zapata	Laredo
50	Baylor, Cottle, King	Seymour
51	Coke, Irion, Schleicher	San Angelo
52	Coryell	Gatesville
53	Travis	Austin
54	McLennan	Waco
55	Harris	Houston
56	Galveston	Galveston
57	Bexar	San Antonio
58	Jefferson	Beaumont
59	Grayson	Sherman
60	Jefferson	Beaumont
61	Harris	Houston
62	Delta, Franklin, Hopkins	Paris
63	Kinney, Terrell	Del Rio
64	Castro, Hale, Swisher	Plainview
65	El Paso	El Paso
66	Hill	Hillsboro
67	Tarrant	Fort Worth
68	Dallas	Dallas
69	Dallam, Hartley, Moore	Dumas
70	Ector	Odessa
71	Harrison	Marshall
72	Crosby, Lubbock	Lubbock
73	Bexar	San Antonio
74	McLennan	Waco
75	Liberty	Liberty
76	Camp, Morris, Titus	Mount Pleasant
77	Freestone, Limestone	Groesbeck
78	Wichita	Wichita Falls
79	Brooks, Jim Wells	Alice
80	Harris	Houston
81	Atascosa, Frio, Karnes	Jourdanton
82	Falls, Robertson	Marlin
83	Pecos, Terrell	Del Rio
84	Hansford, Hutchinson, Ochiltree	Stinnett
85	Brazos	Bryan
86	Kaufman	Kaufman
87	Anderson, Freestone, Leon	Palestine
88	Hardin, Tyler	Woodville
89	Wichita	Wichita Falls
90	Stephens, Young	Graham
91	Eastland	Eastland
92	Hidalgo	Edinburg
93	Hidalgo	Edinburg
94	Nueces	Corpus Christi
95	Dallas	Dallas
96	Tarrant	Fort Worth
97	Archer, Clay, Montague	Montague
98	Travis	Austin
99	Lubbock	Lubbock
100	Carson, Childress, Collingsworth	Clarendon
101	Dallas	Dallas
102	Bowie, Red River	Texarkana
103	Cameron	Brownsville
104	Taylor	Abilene
105	Kenedy, Kleberg, Nueces	Kingsville
106	Dawson, Gaines, Garza	Lamesa
107	Cameron	Brownsville
108	Potter	Amarillo
109	Andrews, Crane, Winkler	Andrews
110	Briscoe, Dickens, Floyd	Floydada
111	Webb	Laredo
112	Crockett, Pecos, Reagan	Ozona
113	Harris	Houston
114	Smith	Tyler
115	Marion, Upshur	Gilmer
116	Dallas	Dallas
117	Nueces	Corpus Christi
118	Glasscock, Howard, Martin	Big Spring
119	Concho, Runnels, Tom Green	San Angelo
120	El Paso	El Paso
121	Terry, Yoakum	Brownfield
122	Galveston	Galveston
123	Panola, Shelby	Carthage
124	Gregg	Longview
125	Harris	Houston
126	Travis	Austin
127	Harris	Houston
128	Orange	Orange
129	Harris	Houston
130	Matagorda	Bay City
131	Bexar	San Antonio
132	Borden, Scurry	Snyder
133	Harris	Houston
134	Dallas	Dallas
135	Calhoun, De Witt, Goliad, Jackson, Refugio	Victoria
136	Jefferson	Beaumont
137	Lubbock	Lubbock
138	Cameron	Brownsville
139	Hidalgo	Edinburg
140	Lubbock	Lubbock
141	Tarrant	Fort Worth
142	Midland	Midland
143	Loving, Reeves, Ward	Monahans
144	Bexar	San Antonio
145	Nacogdoches	Nacogdoches
146	Bell	Belton
147	Travis	Austin
148	Nueces	Corpus Christi
149	Brazoria	Angleton
150	Bexar	San Antonio
151	Harris	Houston
152	Harris	Houston
153	Tarrant	Fort Worth
154	Lamb	Littlefield
155	Austin, Fayette	Grange
156	Aransas, Bee, Live Oak	Sinton
157	Harris	Houston
158	Denton	Denton
159	Angelina	Lufkin
160	Dallas	Dallas
161	Ector	Odessa
162	Dallas	Dallas
163	Orange	Orange
164	Harris	Houston
165	Harris	Houston
166	Bexar	San Antonio
167	Travis	Austin
168	El Paso	El Paso
169	Bell	Belton
170	McLennan	Waco
171	El Paso	El Paso
172	Jefferson	Beaumont
173	Henderson	Athens
174	Harris	Houston
175	Bexar	San Antonio
176	Harris	Houston
177	Harris	Houston
178	Harris	Houston
179	Harris	Houston
180	Harris	Houston
181	Potter, Randall	Canyon
182	Harris	Houston
183	Harris	Houston
184	Harris	Houston
185	Harris	Houston
186	Bexar	San Antonio
187	Bexar	San Antonio
188	Gregg	Longview
189	Harris	Houston
190	Harris	Houston
191	Dallas	Dallas
192	Dallas	Dallas
193	Dallas	Dallas
194	Dallas	Dallas
195	Dallas	Dallas
196	Hunt	Greenville
197	Cameron, Willacy	Brownsville
198	Bandera, Kerr	Kerrville
199	Collin	McKinney
200	Travis	Austin
201	Travis	Austin
202	Bowie	New Boston
203	Dallas	Dallas
204	Dallas	Dallas
205	Culberson, El Paso, Hudspeth	El Paso
206	Hidalgo	Edinburg
207	Caldwell, Comal, Hays	New Braunfels
208	Harris	Houston
209	Harris	Houston
210	El Paso	El Paso
211	Denton	Denton
212	Galveston	Galveston
213	Tarrant	Fort Worth
214	Nueces	Corpus Christi
215	Harris	Houston
216	Gillespie, Kerr	Kerrville
217	Angelina	Lufkin
218	Atascosa, Frio, Karnes	Jourdanton
219	Collin	McKinney
220	Bosque, Comanche, Hamilton	Meridian
222	Deaf Smith, Oldham	Hereford
223	Gray	Pampa
224	Bexar	San Antonio
225	Bexar	San Antonio
226	Bexar	San Antonio
227	Bexar	San Antonio
228	Harris	Houston
229	Duval, Starr	Rio Grande City
230	Harris	Houston
231	Tarrant	Fort Worth
232	Harris	Houston
233	Tarrant	Fort Worth
234	Harris	Houston
235	Cooke	Gainesville
236	Tarrant	Fort Worth
237	Lubbock	Lubbock
238	Midland	Midland
239	Brazoria	Angleton
240	Fort Bend	Richmond
241	Smith	Tyler
242	Castro, Hale, Swisher	Plainview
243	El Paso	El Paso
244	Ector	Odessa
245	Harris	Houston
246	Harris	Houston
247	Harris	Houston
248	Harris	Houston
249	Johnson, Somervell	Cleburne
250	Travis	Austin
251	Potter, Randall	Amarillo
252	Jefferson	Beaumont
253	Chambers, Liberty	Liberty
254	Dallas	Dallas
255	Dallas	Dallas
256	Dallas	Dallas
257	Harris	Houston
258	Polk, San Jacinto, Trinity	Livingston
259	Jones, Shackelford	Anson
260	Orange	Orange
261	Travis	Austin
262	Harris	Houston
263	Harris	Houston
264	Bell	Belton
265	Dallas	Dallas
266	Erath	Stephenville
267	Calhoun, De Witt, Goliad, Jackson, Refugio	Victoria
268	Fort Bend	Richmond
269	Harris	Houston
270	Harris	Houston
271	Jack, Wise	Decatur
272	Brazos	Bryan
273	Sabine, San Augustine, Shelby	San Augustine
274	Comal, Guadalupe, Hays	Seguin
275	Hidalgo	Edinburg
276	Camp Marion, Morris, Titus	Pleasant
277	Williamson	Georgetown
278	Leon, Madison, Walker	Huntsville
279	Jefferson	Beaumont
280	Harris	Houston
281	Harris	Houston
282	Dallas	Dallas
283	Dallas	Dallas
284	Montgomery	Conroe
285	Bexar	San Antonio
286	Cochran, Hockley	Levelland
287	Bailey, Parmer	Muleshoe
288	Bexar	San Antonio
289	Bexar	San Antonio
290	Bexar	San Antonio
291	Dallas	Dallas
292	Dallas	Dallas
293	Dimmit, Maverick, Zavala	Eagle Pass
294	Van Zandt	Canton
295	Harris	Houston
296	Collin	McKinney
297	Tarrant	Fort Worth
298	Dallas	Dallas
299	Travis	Austin
300	Brazoria	Angleton
301	Dallas	Dallas
302	Dallas	Dallas
303	Dallas	Dallas
304	Dallas	Dallas
305	Dallas	Dallas
306	Galveston	Galveston
307	Gregg	Longview
308	Harris	Houston
309	Harris	Houston
310	Harris	Houston
311	Harris	Houston
312	Harris	Houston
313	Harris	Houston
314	Harris	Houston
315	Harris	Houston
316	Hutchinson	Stinnett
317	Jefferson	Beaumont
318	Midland	Midland
319	Nueces	Corpus Christi
320	Potter	Amarillo
321	Smith	Tyler
322	Tarrant	Fort Worth
323	Tarrant	Fort Worth
324	Tarrant	Fort Worth
325	Tarrant	Fort Worth
326	Taylor	Abilene
327	El Paso	El Paso
328	Fort Bend	Richmond
329	Wharton	Wharton
330	Dallas	Dallas
331	Travis	Austin
332	Hidalgo	Edinburg
333	Harris	Houston
334	Harris	Houston
335	Bastrop, Burleson, Lee	Caldwell
336	Fannin	Bonham
337	Harris	Houston
338	Harris	Houston
339	Harris	Houston
340	Tom Green	San Angelo
341	Webb	Laredo
342	Tarrant	Fort Worth
343	Aransas, Bee, Live Oak	Sinton
344	Chambers	Anahuac
345	Travis	Austin
346	El Paso	El Paso
347	Nueces	Corpus Christi
348	Tarrant	Fort Worth
349	Anderson, Houston	Palestine
350	Taylor	Abilene
351	Harris	Houston
352	Tarrant	Fort Worth
353	Travis	Austin
354	Hunt, Rains	Greenville
355	Hood	Granbury
356	Hardin	Kountze
357	Cameron	Brownsville
358	Ector	Odessa
359	Montgomery	Conroe
360	Tarrant	Fort Worth
361	Brazos	Bryan
362	Denton	Denton
363	Dallas	Dallas
364	Lubbock	Lubbock
365	Dimmit, Maverick, Zavala	Eagle Pass
366	Collin	McKinney
367	Denton	Denton
368	Williamson	Georgetown
369	Anderson, Cherokee, Leon	Palestine
370	Hidalgo	Edinburg
371	Tarrant	Fort Worth
372	Tarrant	Fort Worth
377	Victoria	Victoria
378	Ellis	Waxahachie
379	Bexar	San Antonio
380	Collin	McKinney
381	Starr	City
382	Rockwall	Rockwall
383	El Paso	El Paso
384	El Paso	El Paso
385	Midland	Midland
386	Bexar	San Antonio
387	Fort Bend	Richmond
388	El Paso	El Paso
389	Hidalgo	Edinburg
390	Travis	Austin
391	Tom Green	San Angelo
392	Henderson	Athens
393	Denton	Denton
394	Brewster, Culberson, Hudspeth	Alpine
395	Williamson	Georgetown
396	Tarrant	Fort Worth
397	Grayson	Sherman
398	Hidalgo	Edinburg
399	Bexar	San Antonio
400	Fort Bend	Richmond
401	Collin	McKinney
402	Wood	Quitman
403	Travis	Austin
404	Cameron	Brownsville
405	Galveston	Galveston
406	Webb	Laredo
407	Bexar	San Antonio
408	Bexar	San Antonio
409	El Paso	El Paso
410	Montgomery	Conroe
411	Polk, San Jacinto, Trinity	Livingston
412	Brazoria	Angleton
413	Johnson	Cleburne
414	McLennan	Waco
415	Parker	Weatherford
416	Collin	McKinney
417	Collin	McKinney
418	Montgomery	Conroe
419	Travis	Austin
420	Nacogdoches	Nacogdoches
421	Caldwell	Lockhart
422	Kaufman	Kaufman
423	Bastrop	Bastrop
424	Blanco, Burnet, Llano	Burnet
425	Williamson	Georgetown
426	Bell	Belton
427	Travis	Austin
428	Hays	San Marcos
429	Collin	McKinney
430	Hidalgo	Edinburg
431	Denton	Denton
432	Tarrant	Fort Worth
433	Comal	New Braunfels
434	Fort Bend	Richmond
435	Montgomery	Conroe
436	Bexar	San Antonio
437	Bexar	San Antonio
438	Bexar	San Antonio
439	Rockwall	Rockwall
440	Coryell	Gatesville
441	Midland	Midland
442	Denton	Denton
443	Ellis	Waxahachie
444	Cameron	Brownsville
445	Cameron	Brownsville
446	Ector	Odessa
448	El Paso	El Paso
449	Hidalgo	Edinburg
450	Travis	Austin
451	Kendall	Boerne
452	Edwards, Kimble, Mason	Mason
453	Hays	San Marcos
454	Medina	Hondo
458	Fort Bend	Richmond
459	Travis	Austin
460	Travis	Austin
461	Brazoria	Angleton
462	Denton	Denton
464	Hidalgo	Edinburg
468	Collin	McKinney
469	Collin	McKinney
470	Collin	McKinney
471	Collin	McKinney
505	Fort Bend	Richmond
506	Grimes, Waller	Hempstead
507	Harris	Houston

=== Probate Courts ===
In another unique twist, the Constitution grants the Legislature the authority to determine which court handles probate matters. Thus, in ten of the 15 largest counties (specifically, the counties of Bexar, Collin, Dallas, Denton, El Paso, Galveston, Harris, Hidalgo, Tarrant, and Travis) the Legislature has established one or more Statutory Probate Courts. These specialized courts handle matters of probate, guardianship, trust, and mental health. In some counties, the statutory probate courts also hear condemnation cases. There are no jurisdictional monetary limits on the types of lawsuits that a statutory probate court may hear. As such, their jurisdiction at times overlaps that of the district court.

=== Constitutional County Courts ===
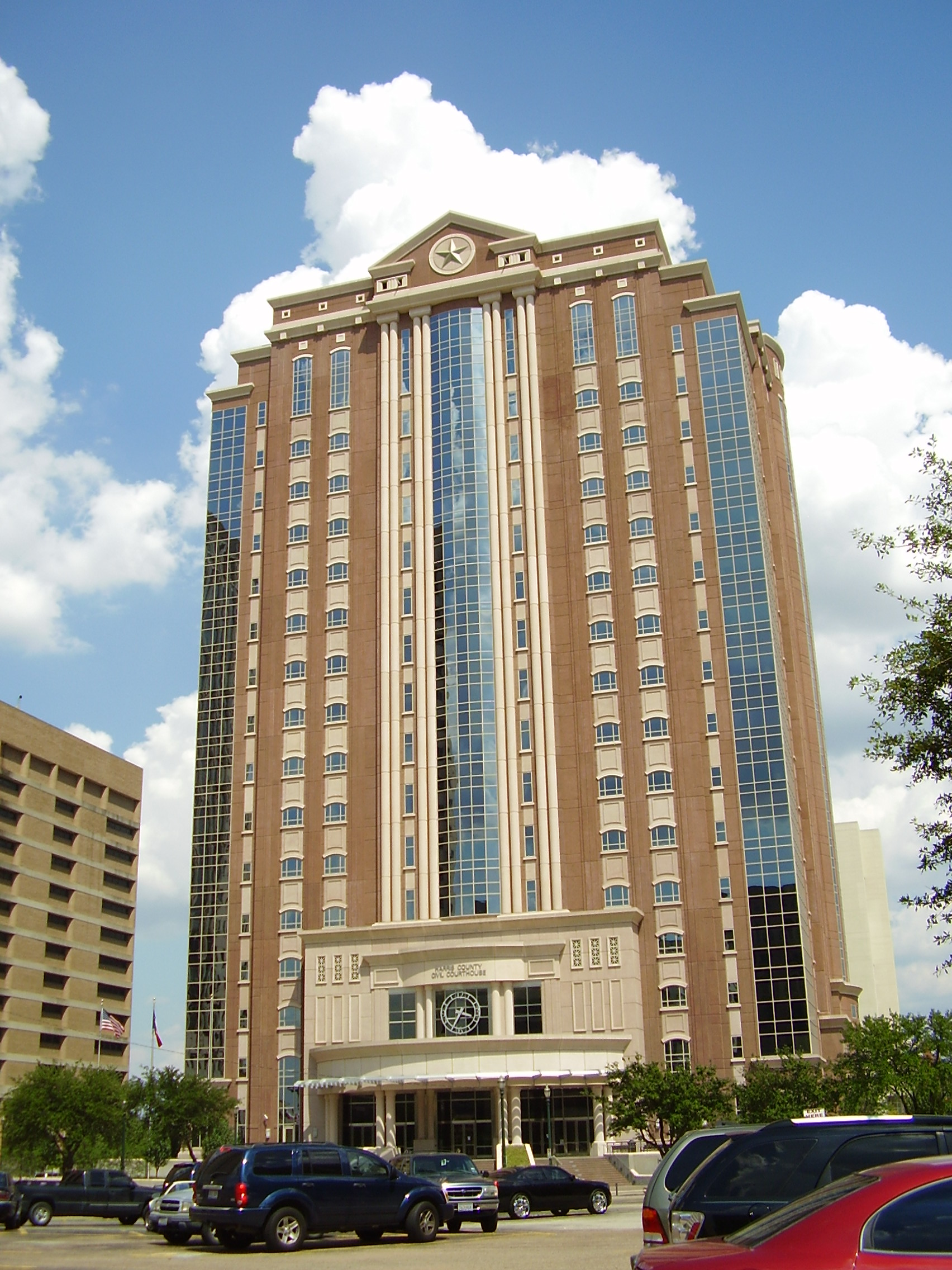
The Harris County Civil Courthouse

Not to be confused with County Courts at Law, which are created by statute, there is a County Court for each of the 254 counties in Texas. The Texas Constitution states that "[t]here shall be established in each county in this State a County Court ..." Sections 15 through 17 of Article V, as well as Chapters 25 and 26 of the Texas Government Code, outline the duties of these Courts and their officers.

The county court has exclusive jurisdiction over "Class A" and "Class B" misdemeanors (these offenses can involve jail time), concurrent jurisdiction over civil cases where the amount in controversy is moderately sized, and appellate jurisdiction over JP and municipal court cases (for municipal court cases, this may involve a trial de novo if the lower court is not a "court of record").

County court judges are not required to be licensed attorneys. Due to this, defendants in counties which only have the traditional constitutional county court may ask to have their cases transferred to that county's district court for trial if the district judge consents . However, defendants in counties with the county court at law structure do not have this option, as the county court at law judges are required to have law degrees.

Section 15 states that the County Court shall be a "court of record". Section 16 states that the County Court "has jurisdiction as provided by law"; Section 17 states that the County Court shall hold terms as provided by law and that County Court juries shall consist of six persons, but in civil cases a jury shall not be empaneled unless one of the parties demands it and pays a jury fee or files an affidavit stating that it is unable to do so.

Since the county judge is also responsible for presiding over the Commissioners Court (the main executive and legislative body of the county), in 94 counties the Texas Legislature has established county courts at law to relieve the county judge of judicial duties. The first multi-county statutory county court (composed of Fisher, Mitchell, and Nolan counties) was created in 2013. In most counties with courts at law, the civil and criminal jurisdiction of the constitutional county court has been transferred to the county courts at law. Unlike the county judge, judges of the county courts of law are required to be attorneys. The county courts at law may hear both civil and criminal matters, or hear them separately, depending on how the Legislature has structured them (Dallas, Denton, El Paso, Harris, and Tarrant counties have "county criminal courts" or "county criminal courts at law" that hear only criminal cases).

=== Statutory County Courts at Law ===
Statutory County Courts at Law, not to be confused with Constitutional County Courts, generally have broader jurisdiction than constitutional county courts. Statutory County Courts can generally entertain lawsuits in which the amount in controversy is over $500 but not over $200,000. However, unlike constitutional county courts, the jurisdiction of Statutory County Courts can vary from county to county. For example, in Dallas County, Statutory County Courts have jurisdiction nearly as broad as that of District Courts. In Harris County, the genera jurisdictional cap is $200,000 but these courts also have exclusive jurisdiction of eminent domain proceedings regardless of the amount in controversy. In Travis County, the amount in controversy for matters the Statutory County Court can entertain ranges from $500 to $250,000. There is no clear policy reason for the varying jurisdictions of the Statutory County Courts.

=== Municipal Courts ===
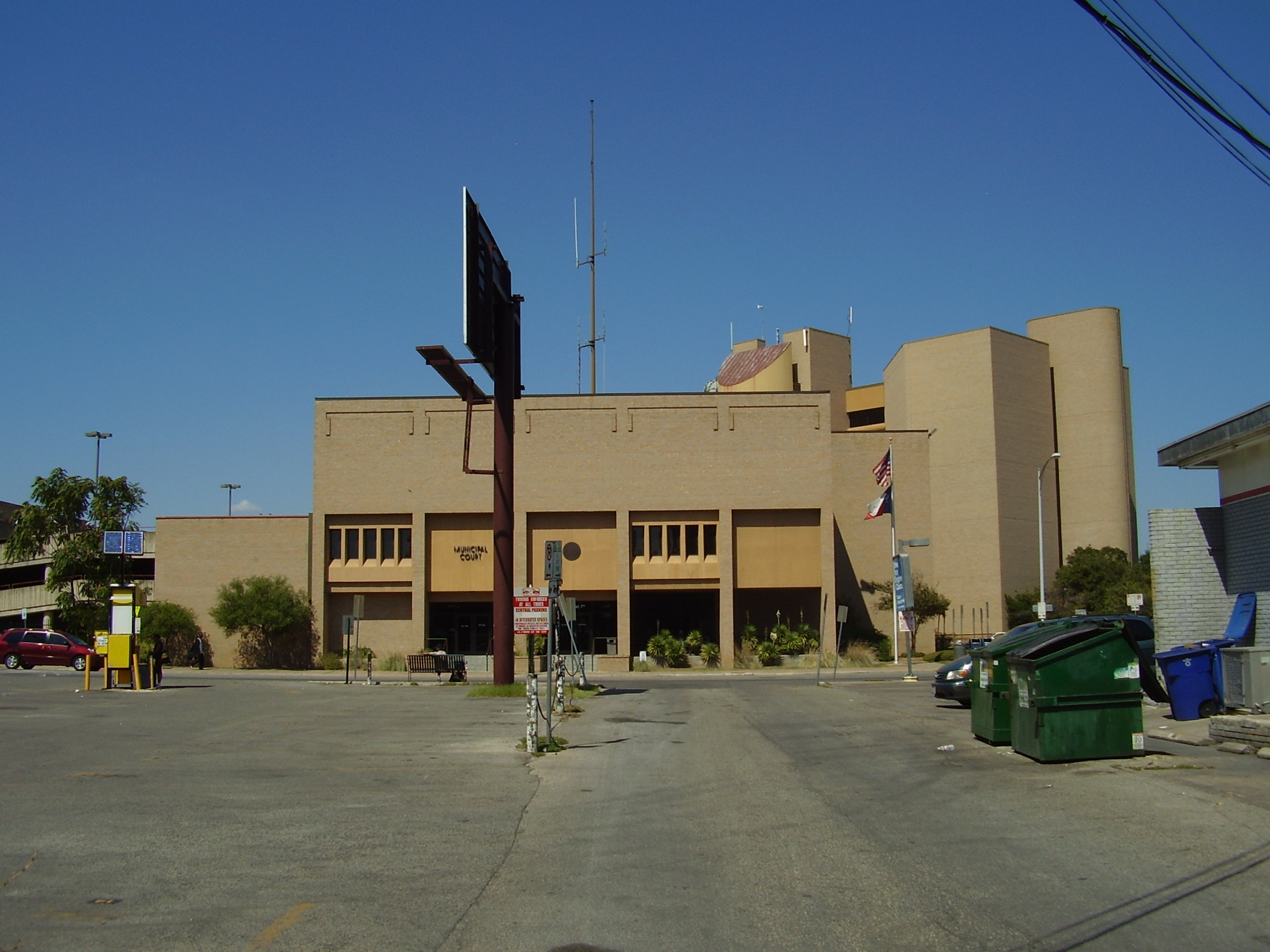
Former Location of the Austin Municipal Court

Under the authority granted it by Section 1 of Article V, the Legislature has allowed for the creation of municipal courts in each incorporated city in Texas, by voter approval creating such court. Chapters 29 and 30 of the Texas Government Code outline the duties of these Courts and their officers.

Municipal courts in Texas come into contact with more defendants than all other Texas courts combined. The subject matter of municipal courts relates to crimes relating to public safety and quality of life issues. In recent years, municipal courts and justice court in Texas have become the primary venue for acts of misconduct committed by children.

Within the city limits, these courts have shared jurisdiction with the JP courts on Class C criminal misdemeanor cases, and have exclusive jurisdiction on cases involving city ordinances. Municipal courts have limited civil jurisdiction over public matters relating to public safety (e.g., dangerous dog determinations). Confusion surrounding a municipal court's civil jurisdiction is complicated that if a municipal court is a "court of record," the Legislature has authorized municipalities to adopt ordinances that give municipal courts concurrent jurisdiction over substandard building cases with county and/or district courts. The matter of civil jurisdiction has been further confused by the advent of civil penalties for conduct that can be prosecuted as a Class C misdemeanor (e.g. certain parking violations, red light camera violations).

As a general rule, the municipal courts are not "courts of record" (i.e., no court reporter recorded and transcribed the proceedings), and thus an appeal to the county level would require a whole new trial (i.e., a trial de novo). This proved to be a loophole for some defendants in traffic cases, who betted on the officer not being able to attend, and thus having the case dismissed. Furthermore, the de novo trials crowded the dockets of already busy county courts at law. Many major cities—such as those in Austin, El Paso, Houston, Dallas and San Antonio—have chosen to convert their municipal courts to courts of record (this also requires voter approval) to close this loophole.

Municipal court cases are generally appealed to the county court level, but cannot be appealed beyond that level unless the fine is more than $100 or a constitutional matter is asserted.

=== Justice of the Peace Courts ===
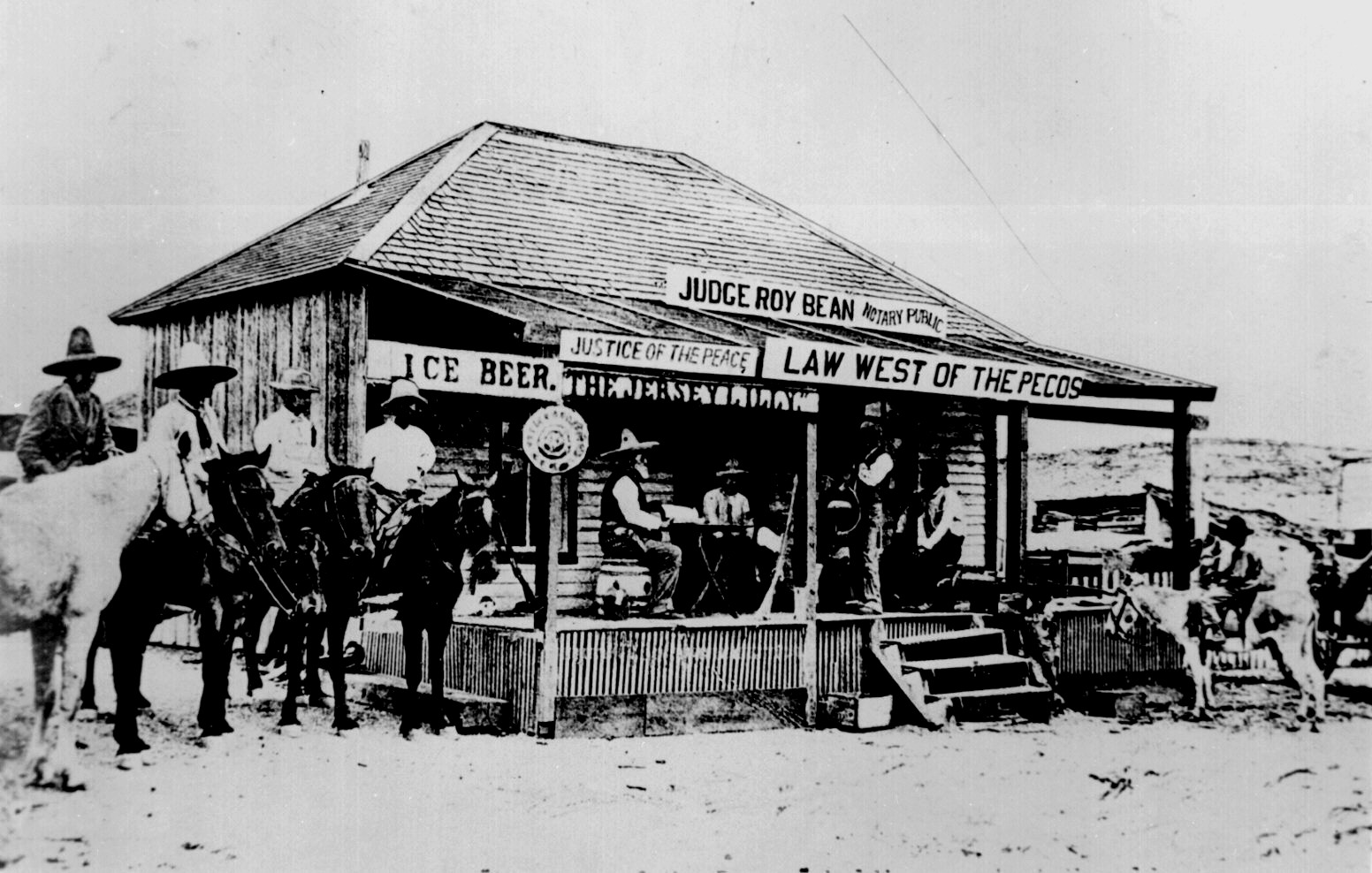
A JP court of Judge Roy Bean in 1900

The lowest court level in Texas is the Justice of the Peace Court (also called Justice Court or JP Court). Each county has at least one JP Court. Sections 18 and 19 of Article V, as well as Chapters 27 and 28 of the Texas Government Code, outline the duties of these Courts and their officers.

Section 19 sets forth the minimum jurisdiction of the JP court:

- Original jurisdiction in "criminal matters of misdemeanor cases punishable by fine only" (called "Class C" misdemeanor cases under the Texas Penal Code),
- Exclusive jurisdiction in "civil matters where the amount in controversy is $200 or less", and
- "Such other jurisdiction as may be provided by law". Under this provision, the Legislature has raised the top limit on civil matters to $20,000 and assigned the JP courts, among others, the right to hear cases involving eviction as well as cases involving foreclosure, liens against personal property where the amount falls within the (revised) JP Court's jurisdiction, and general small claims disputes. In addition, marriage licenses are obtained through JP offices, and JP's are also legally permitted to perform marriage ceremonies.

JP cases are appealed to the county court level where the case results in a trial de novo. The perfection of the appeal vacates the judgment of the JP court, which means that the higher court does not reverse or affirm the JP court when it resolves the appeal. The case is instead retried on appeal, but the jurisdictional limits of the JP court, rather than those of the court of record, apply. Appeals from JP court also differ from appeals to the courts of appeals in that they require the posting of bond. This makes such appeals more onerous to losing defendants than appeals from county courts to the court of appeals unless the defendant qualifies to proceed in forma pauperis.

In criminal cases, cases beginning in justice court cannot be appealed beyond the county level court unless the fine is more than $100 or a constitutional matter is asserted.

Under Section 18, the number of JP's (and associated constables; each county has as many constables as JP's) is dependent on the size of the county:

- For counties with populations less than 18,000 (as determined by the census), the entire county shall be one JP precinct, unless the Commissioners' Court determines that more are needed, in which case the court can divide the county into no more than four JP precincts.
- For counties with populations at least 18,000 but less than 50,000, the number of JP precincts shall be no less than two nor more than eight.
- For counties with populations 50,000 or greater, the number of JP precincts shall be no less than four nor more than eight.
- In any county with population less than 150,000, if any precinct contains a city with 18,000 or more population, that precinct shall have two JP's.
- In any county with population 150,000 or greater, each JP precinct may have more than one JP.
- Special provisions apply to Chambers and Randall counties (must have no fewer than two nor more than six precincts) and to Mills, Reagan, and Roberts (the Constable office is abolished, with the Sheriff's office performing all duties).

== Administration ==
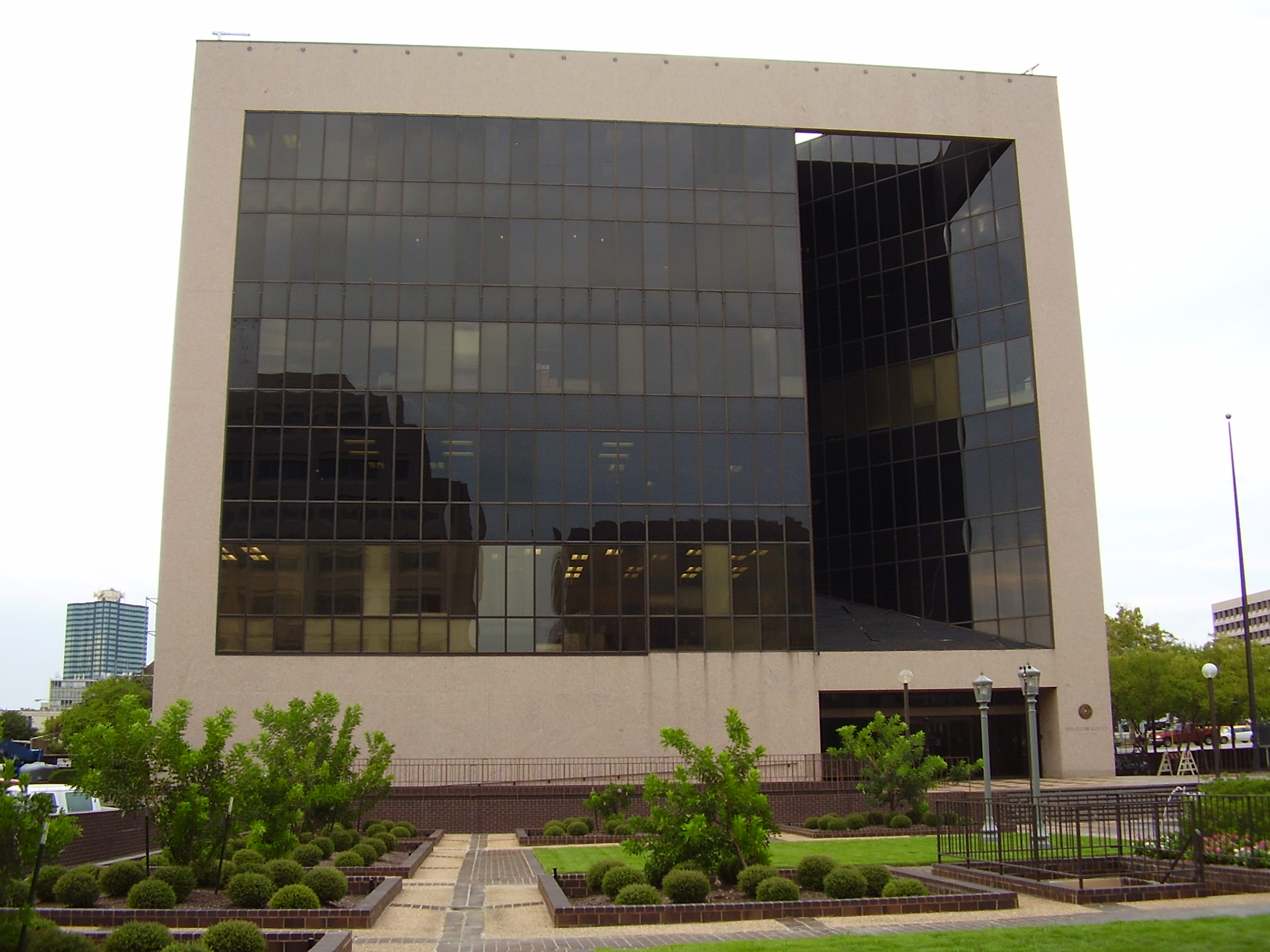
The Texas Law Center, which houses the State Bar of Texas

The Texas Supreme Court has constitutional responsibility for the efficient administration of the judicial system and possesses the authority to make rules of administration applicable to the courts in addition to promulgation and amend rules governing procedure in trial and appellate courts, and rules of evidence. The chief justice of the Supreme Court, presiding judge of the Court of Criminal Appeals, chief justices of each of the 14 courts of appeals, and judges of each of the trial courts are generally responsible for the administration of their respective courts.

There is a local administrative district judge in each county, as well as a local administrative statutory county court judge in each county that has a statutory county court. In counties with two or more district courts, a local administrative district judge is elected by the district judges in the county for a term not to exceed two years; in counties with two or more statutory county courts, a local administrative statutory county court judge is elected by the statutory county court judges for a term not to exceed two years. The local administrative judge is charged with implementing the local rules of administration, supervising the expeditious movement of court caseloads, and other administrative duties.

eFileTexas.gov is the official electronic court filing (e-filing) system. Each county maintains (or does not maintain) their own docket management and retrieval systems, similar to PACER for the federal government. There is no longer an officially published reporter. West's Texas Cases (a Texas-specific version of the South Western Reporter) includes reported opinions of the Supreme Court, the Court of Criminal Appeals, and the Courts of Appeals. The Texas Reports includes Supreme Court opinions until July 1962, and the Texas Criminal Reports includes Court of Criminal Appeals opinions until November 1962. There is no systematic reporting of decisions of trial courts. Court opinions can generally be freely accessed on the web from the various courts' websites, with appellate opinions generally being available from 1997–2002 onwards.

In 2014 the Texas Court of Appeals's web sites were updated and migrated to new web addresses (with automatic forwarding from the old URLs). Each court's website allows for case and opinion searches using various types of input in addition to cause number, such as party name, attorney name, attorney bar number, file date/date range, and full-text search using key words. All current opinion are now released as pdf documents, rather than html, and thus standardized, although different courts use different templates and citation/footnoting styles, which makes for some degree of variation in appearance. Additionally, courts of appeals are now also making procedural orders, briefs, and motions available online. The record on appeal, consisting of the Clerk's Record and the Reporter's Record, however, is generally not posted online even if the parties' briefs are.

Appellate opinions are also available through Google Scholar. Google Scholar presents them in a format that is more user-friendly for online viewing (compared to the double-spaced PDFs in small font released by the courts), hotlinks cited cases, and provides other functionality, such as identification of subsequent citing cases and ranking of search results by relevancy or time (recency) and time-frame delimited searches. Google Scholar versions now also include attorney information for each decided case, but they do not (as of May 2018) provide a hotlink to the appellate dockets, which would be a very useful additional feature. Google instead uses the hot-linked cause numbers internally to link opinions in a case with the procedural orders issued in the same case that are also included in its database. By clicking the cause number, all documents available for a particular case in the Google Scholar database can be displayed on a search results page, and can be sorted into reverse chronological order if desired.

The Texas Judicial Council is the primary policy-making body for the judiciary. It is responsible for studying and recommending changes to improve the administration of justice. The Administrative Director of the Office of Court Administration serves as Executive Director for the Council.

The Texas Office of Court Administration provides information and research, technology services, budgetary and legal support, and other administrative assistance to a variety of judicial branch entities and courts, under the supervision of the Supreme Court of Texas and the Chief Justice. The office is led by an Administrative Director appointed by the Supreme Court and reporting to the Chief Justice.

The State Bar of Texas (the Texas Bar) is an agency of the judiciary under the administrative control of the Texas Supreme Court. The Texas Bar is responsible for assisting the Texas Supreme Court in overseeing all attorneys licensed to practice law in Texas.

== Officers ==
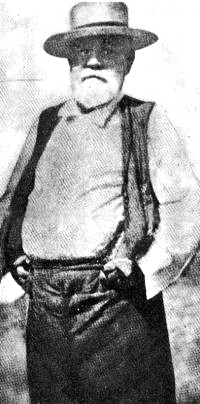
Judge Roy Bean, a Justice of the Peace and "The Law West of the Pecos"

=== Judges, Judicial Selection, and Judicial Succession ===
In Texas, state judges are elected in partisan elections. Trial judges are elected for 4 years, and appellate court judges are elected for 6 years. The Governor fills vacancies until the next election, and judges traditionally leave office before their last term is completed.

=== Criticism and reform of judicial selection ===
Texas is one of only a few states in the United States that selects judges for all levels of courts through partisan elections. This system has been the subject of significant debate and criticism from legal scholars and former judges, who argue that it threatens judicial impartiality.

One major criticism is the influence of "straight-ticket voting" (or partisan sweeps), where judges are often removed from office based on national political trends rather than their judicial qualifications or record. For example, critics note that experienced judges are frequently swept out of office solely because voters are voting for a Governor or President of a different party at the top of the ballot.

Another central concern is the role of campaign contributions. Because candidates must fund expensive statewide campaigns, they often accept donations from lawyers and firms that appear before their courts. This has led to the "Cash for Justice" controversy, raising concerns about potential conflicts of interest.

In 2019, the Texas Legislature created the Texas Commission on Judicial Selection to study alternatives to this system. In 2020, the Commission recommended ending partisan judicial elections, but the Texas Legislature failed to pass the necessary constitutional amendments to enact these reforms in the 2021 and 2023 sessions.

All state-wide elective positions in the executive and judicial branch are currently controlled by Republicans because the state as a whole is solidly red. Appellate and trial court judges, however, are elected from districts, and some of those districts are more competitive than Texas as a whole, and some even have a clear Democratic majority.

In the November 6, 2018 midterm elections numerous Republican appellate justices lost to Democratic challengers, entailing in a switch from Republican to Democratic majority control effective January 1, 2019 in Dallas and in the two Courts of Appeals in Houston, and major changes in the partisan makeup of other courts, including Austin and San Antonio.

There are other scenarios that can result in turnover on benches, but they are rare. The predominant source of change in the composition of the judiciary involves politics.

Some incumbent judges/justices who seek reelection are defeated in primary elections, others in general elections. The probability of election-driven turnover on district and appellate benches is affected by the nature of the concurrent elections (presidential or mid-term) and by partisan tides, at least in the more competitive counties and appellate districts, e.g. Dallas and Harris County/Houston (county-level) and San Antonio (appellate district level).

In 2006, several dozen Republican incumbents were swept off their benches by Democrats in Dallas County, and in 2008, many incumbents lost in Harris County.

District court judges are required to be licensed attorneys. In addition to judicial powers, district judges also have administrative duties as well. District judges may remove county officials , officials of a general-law municipality , and municipal court judges under certain circumstances. Also, they appoint and supervise the county auditor, oversee the operations of the adult and juvenile probation offices, and are granted "supervisory" jurisdiction over the county commissioners court.

County judges do not need to be lawyers, and most are not. Sections 15 through 17 of Article V, as well as Chapters 25 and 26 of the Texas Government Code, outline the duties of County Court officers. Section 15 states that the county judge shall be "well informed in the law of the State", "a conservator of the peace", and shall be elected for a four-year term. The county judge is also responsible for presiding over the Commissioners Court (the main executive and legislative body of the county). County court at law judges are required to be lawyers.

In one of the odd provisions of the Texas Government Code, there is no requirement that a municipal judge be an attorney if the municipal court is not a court of record (Chapter 29, Section 29.004), but the municipal judge must be a licensed attorney with at least two years experience in practicing Texas law if the municipal court is a court of record (Chapter 30, Section 30.00006). The Code provides for differing requirements for municipal judges in certain cities, such as:

- Lubbock (five years experience, Section 30.00044)
- El Paso (provides for a presiding judge to be paid 20% above the other judges, Section 30.00128)
- San Antonio (must have resided in the city for three years prior to appointment, Section 30.00224)
- Wichita Falls (need not be a resident of the city when appointed but must be a resident during their tenure, Section 30.00304),
- Sweetwater (need only be a licensed attorney in good standing, Section 30.00464)
- Lewisville ("shall devote as much time to the office as it requires", Section 30.01326)
- Houston ("may only be removed under Article V, Section 1-a, of the Texas Constitution", Section 30.00674)
- Bullard (the requirement for being a licensed attorney does not apply, Section 30.01482)
- Westlake and Trophy Club (both cities are located in Tarrant and Denton counties; for Westlake criminal appeals are taken to the Tarrant County Courts at Law, while for Trophy Club criminal appeals are taken to the Denton County Courts at Law, Sections 30.01781 and 30.01811)

The thirteen-member Texas State Commission on Judicial Conduct hears complaints against judges, and may censure, reprimand, or recommend removal by the Supreme Court. It very rarely punishes judges; out of more than 1,110 complaints it resolved in fiscal year 2009, only 70 disciplinary actions were taken.

=== Justices of the Peace ===
There is no requirement that the JP be an attorney. However, the Texas Government Code requires a JP to attend an 80-hour course involving the performance of JP duties within one year after initial election, and a 20-hour course every year thereafter. In addition, the JP is an ex officio notary public.

=== Magistrates ===
A "magistrate" can be any judge or JP and can set bonds, arraign defendants, issue search and arrest warrants, and conduct criminal bond forfeiture hearings. Five counties (Bexar, Dallas, Lubbock, Tarrant, and Travis) have district court magistrates who are appointed by district court judges and do not conduct trials.

=== Prosecutors ===
There are several prosecution offices: district attorneys, county attorneys, criminal district attorneys, and city attorneys. District attorneys prosecute criminal cases in district courts and serve one or more counties in which they are elected for four-year terms. County attorneys prosecute misdemeanor criminal cases and serve a single county in which they are elected for four-year terms. Criminal district attorneys prosecute both felony and misdemeanor criminal cases and serve a single county in which they are elected for four-year terms. City attorneys prosecute criminal cases in municipal courts. If a county has only a district attorney or county attorney, this official prosecutes all criminal cases within the county.

== See also ==
- Government of Texas
- Law of Texas
- Law enforcement in Texas
