= Texas Courts of Appeals =

Intermediate appellate courts of Texas

The Texas Courts of Appeals are fifteen courts that constitute the intermediate appellate courts of the Texas judicial system.The courts hold appellate jurisdiction over nearly all appeals from the state's district, county, and statutory courts. The sole exception is death penalty cases, which must be appealed directly to the Texas Court of Criminal Appeals, the state's court of last resort for criminal matters.

The Courts of Appeals system consists of fourteen courts throughout the state, each of which are assigned a specific set of counties for their jurisdiction, as well as a statewide appeals court, which has statutory jurisdiction for appeals involving large business transactions, the state government, or constitutional challenges. Typically, both criminal and civil cases are appealed to the court matching the case's original trial location; however, cases can be transferred between courts of appeal at the discretion of the Supreme Court of Texas.

Each court of appeal has a panel of at least three justices, with the largest, the Dallas-based Fifth Court of Appeals, having thirteen. The size of each court is determined by statute and is largely based on the court's historical number of case filings, to allow for timely adjudication. On courts with more than three judges, each case will typically be overseen by a panel of three judges selected at random. Judges are elected to six-year terms in partisan elections during even-numbered years; if a vacancy arises, a replacement may be appointed by the Governor of Texas, who holds the seat until the next election year.

== Structure ==
Appellate courts consisting of more than three justices hear and decide cases in panels of three. Those courts with more than three justices sit in rotating panels and do not consistently sit with the same justices. On rare occasions, all the justices of a court of appeals sit together en banc to reconsider a panel decision or to assure consistency in that court's jurisprudence. The en banc process is also used to overrule prior precedent of the same court which its panels would otherwise follow.

Precedents established by a court of appeals are binding on the lower courts in its own district, but not in others. When conflicting rulings arise, the Supreme Court of Texas (in civil cases) or Court of Criminal Appeals (in criminal cases) will resolve the conflict to provide consistent legal precedent for the state's litigants. Decisions of the two courts of last resort on questions of law are binding on all state courts, and are also followed by federal courts when they hear cases governed by Texas state law.

The federal courts sitting in Texas apply state law when the case is not controlled by federal law or by the law of another jurisdiction based contractual choice of law or other basis for application of another's jurisdiction's law. Not infrequently the federal district courts sitting in Texas and the U.S. Fifth Circuit Court of Appeals make guesses as to how the Texas Supreme Court would rule on an issue of state law that is still unsettled due to a conflict among the intermediate courts of appeals. Such an issue may also be referred to the Texas Supreme Court by certified question, but this procedure is rarely employed.

In a small number of instances, (4-6% in recent years), the Texas Supreme Court transfers a case from one court to another. Under Texas Rule of Appellate Procedure 41.3, the transferee court must apply controlling precedents of the court from which the case was sent, if they exist. All courts of appeals retain the discretion to recall retired justices to assist writing any backlog of opinions in the court.

== History ==
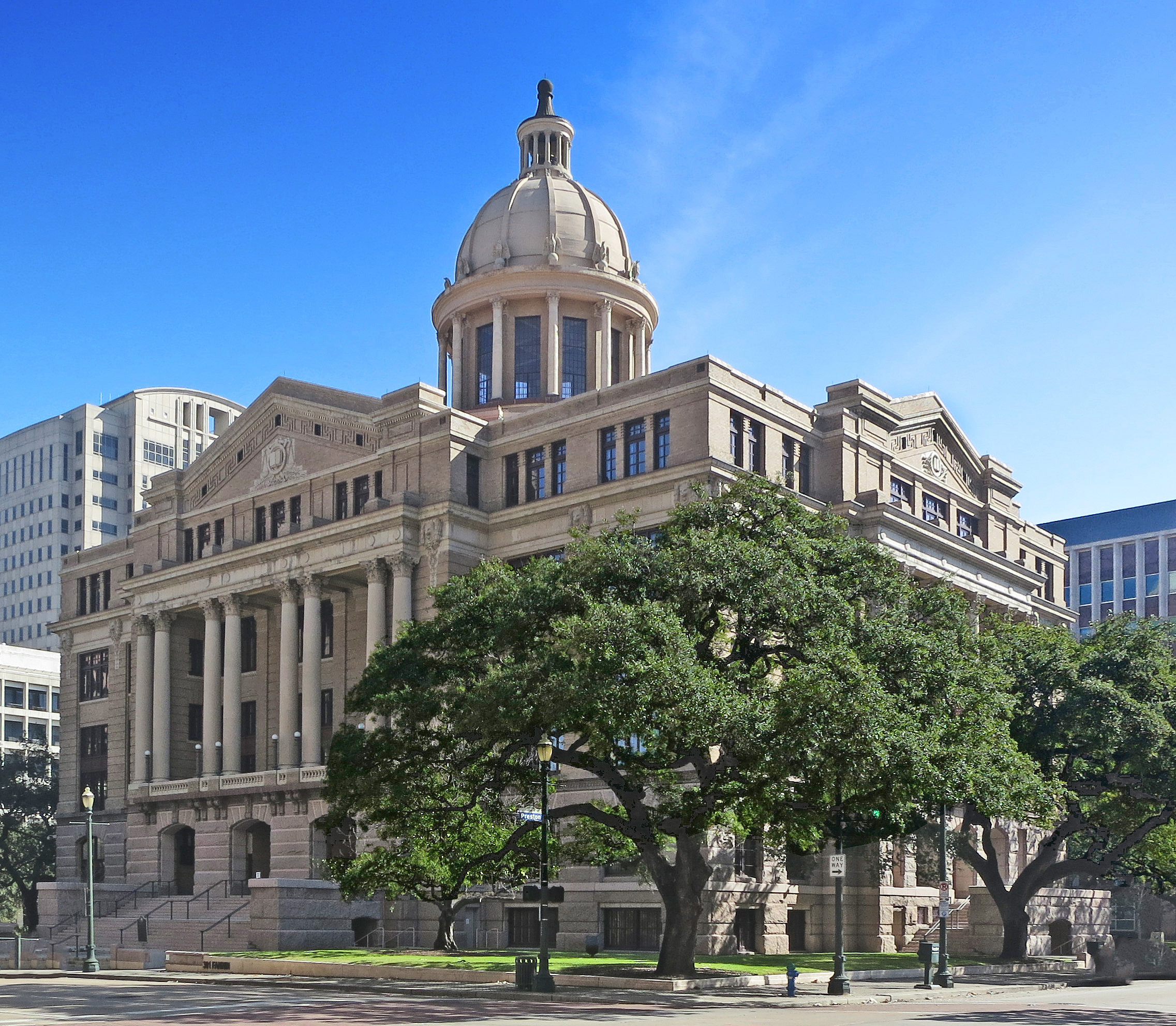
The Old Harris County Courthouse, home of the First and Fourteenth Courts of Appeals of Texas

From 1836, when Texas gained independence from Mexico, until 1876, the Supreme Court of Texas served as the state's only appellate court. During this period, the court had jurisdiction over both civil and criminal cases and was responsible for deciding questions of fact as well as law. This centralized structure remained in place for several decades as the state's legal system developed.

=== Establishment and early development (1891–1925) ===
Courts of civil appeals in Texas were established in 1891 by constitutional amendment to help handle the increasing load of the court system. They had jurisdiction to hear appeals and mandamus petitions of any civil case from their region, with the regions decided by the Legislature. The amendment provided that three-judge courts of appeals were to be created by Legislature, and in 1892, the Legislature created 3 courts of appeals: The First Court of Civil Appeals in Galveston, the Second Court of Civil Appeals in Fort Worth, and the Third Court of Civil Appeals in Austin. In 1893, the Legislature created the Fourth Court of Civil Appeals in San Antonio out of territory taken from the first and third courts, and the Fifth Court of Appeals in Dallas. In 1907, the Legislature created the Sixth Court of Civil Appeals in Texarkana. Then in 1911, the Seventh Court of Civil Appeals in Amarillo and the Eighth Court of Civil Appeals in El Paso were created. Soon after that, the Ninth Court of Civil Appeals was created in Beaumont in 1915, the Tenth was created in Waco in 1923, and the Eleventh was created in Eastland in 1925.

=== Relocation and mid-20th century expansion (1957–1970s) ===
In 1957, after Hurricane Audrey severely damaged the Galveston County Courthouse, the Legislature moved the First Court of Appeals to Houston (where it sits today) and required Harris County to provide facilities.

It was not until the 1960s that any more courts were created. In 1963, the Legislature established the Twelfth Court of Civil Appeals in Tyler and the Thirteenth in Corpus Christi. The Fourteenth Court was established in Houston in 1967, exercising concurrent jurisdiction with the First Court.

A law was passed in 1975 allowing the Thirteenth Court to "transact its business at the county seat of any of the counties within its district, as the Court shall determine it necessary and convenient..." A branch of the court was created in Edinburg, and the court today operates in both Edinburg and Corpus Christi.

In 1977, the legislature increased the number of judges of various courts and authorized courts of appeals to sit in "panels" of not fewer than three judges.

=== Jurisdictional changes (1981–1985) ===
Until 1981, all criminal appeals were handled exclusively by the Texas Court of Criminal Appeals, with no intermediate appellate courts.

On September 1, 1981, a significant shift in the role of the Texas' intermediate appeals courts occurred when all Courts of Civil Appeals were granted jurisdiction over criminal cases, with the exception of crimes involving capital punishment, which continued to fall under the jurisdiction of the Texas Court of Criminal Appeals.

In 1985, a constitutional amendment formally changed the designation of these courts from "Courts of Civil Appeals" to simply "Courts of Appeals," reflecting their expanded jurisdiction over both civil and criminal cases.

=== Shifts in the courts (2019) ===
In January 2019, a large number of newly elected justices took office, which required panels that included incumbents who were defeated in the November 2018 elections to be reconstituted, though in practice, this reconstitution caused little disruption in court productivity. Because of similar turnover in many metropolitan trial courts, the court procedure rules required pending mandamus cases to be abated and remanded for the new trial court judge to reconsider the challenged order of his or her predecessor.

The overall effect of the November 2018 Democratic sweep of the appellate courts in Houston, Dallas, and Austin was to make the intermediate appellate judiciary more diverse in terms of party affiliation, gender, and race/ethnicity, as can be seen by comparing the demographic statistics reported by the Office of Court Administration for 2018 and 2019.

=== Creation of the Fifteenth Court of Appeals (2023-24) ===
In 2023, the Texas Legislature created a new statewide Fifteenth Court of Appeals by statute. The Fifteenth Court has jurisdiction over specific types of cases, namely lawsuits involving the state government or state officers, appeals from the Texas Business Court, and challenges to the constitutionality or validity of state statutes. The creation of the court was criticized by some observers, who viewed it as a Republican political ploy to direct cases away from appeals courts with Democratic majorities. In August 2024, the Texas Supreme Court rejected a constitutional challenge to the appellate court's creation.

The court began to hear cases on September 1, 2024, with then-governor Greg Abbott appointing the court's first three justices. The court will be expanded to five justices in 2027. The first statewide election for the court was held in 2026, with Abbott's appointees running for full six-year terms.

== Jurisdictions and justices ==
Locations of Courts of Appeals

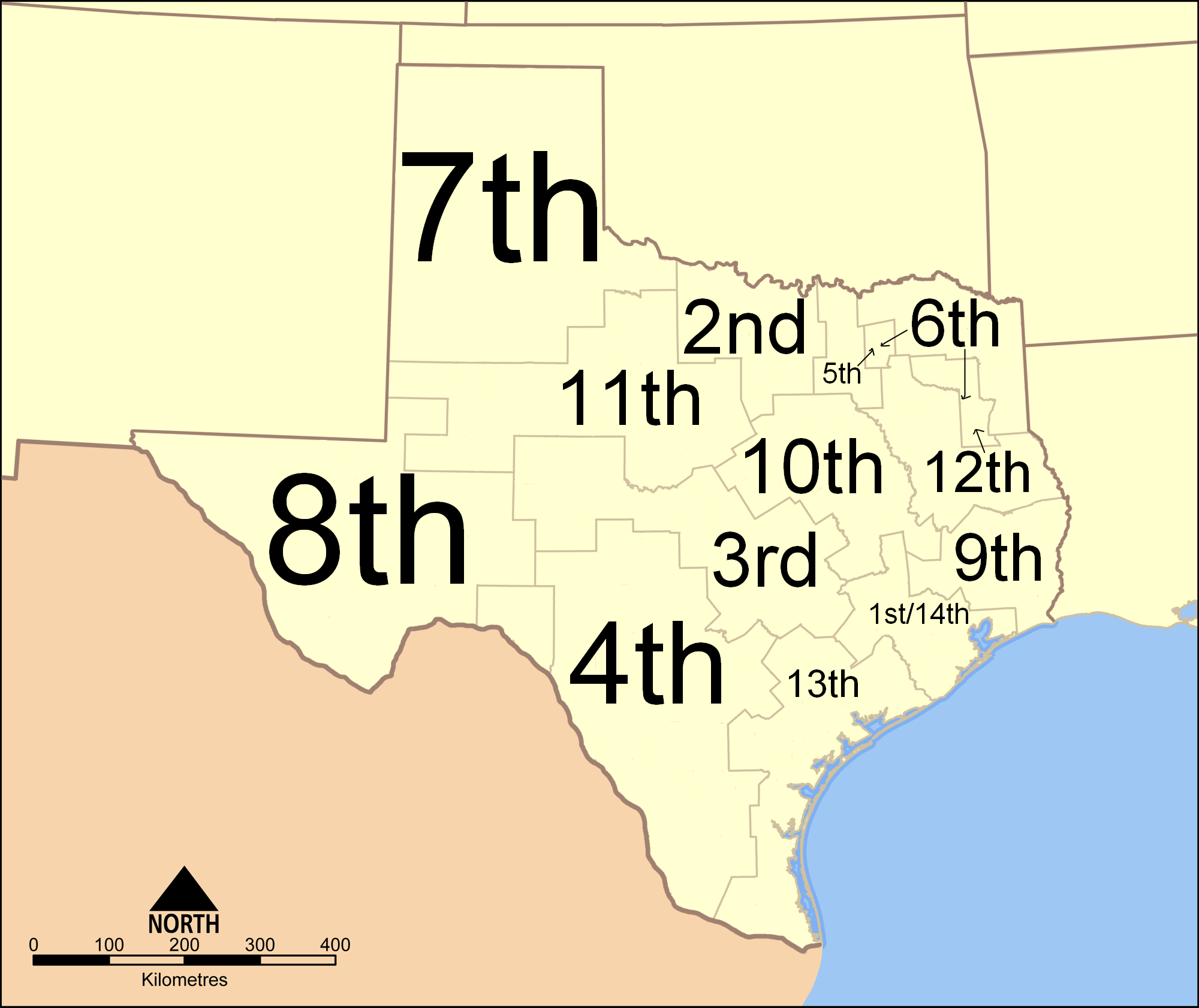
Districts map

Fourteen of the state's fifteen courts of appeal utilize geographic appellate districts, giving each court jurisdiction over civil and criminal appeals for a specific group of counties. Some of the courts' jurisdictions overlap: Gregg, Rusk, Upshur, and Wood Counties are in the jurisdictions of both the Sixth and Twelfth Courts, while Hunt County is in the jurisdiction of both the Fifth and Sixth Courts. Additionally, the First and Fourteenth districts share their entire jurisdiction of ten counties in the Greater Houston area.

A fifteenth court has statewide jurisdiction over certain cases involving the state and certain business cases.

Each court has at least three judges. On courts with more than three judges, individual cases are heard by a panel of three judges picked at random. In even-numbered years, judges are elected to six-year terms in partisan elections by residents of the counties in their court's jurisdiction. Judges are required to retire at the age of 75. (Note: Under Article 5 of the Texas Constitution, justices who reach the age of 75 during the first four years of their 6-year term, must retire by December 31st of the 4th year of their term. If justices reach the age of 75 during the 5th or 6th year of their term, they will be able to serve out the remainder of their term.) If a vacancy arises, the Governor of Texas may appoint a replacement, who will serve until the next election.

=== First Court of Appeals ===
The First Court of Appeals of Texas, based in Houston (formerly Galveston), hears appeals from the following counties: Austin, Brazoria, Chambers, Colorado, Fort Bend, Galveston, Grimes, Harris, Waller, and Washington. The court shares jurisdiction over these counties with the Fourteenth Court of Appeals. The court has nine justices.

Seat	Name	Born	Start	Next Election	Mandatory Retirement	Party	Appointer	Law School
1	Terry Adams, Chief Justice	1958 or 1959 (age 67–68)	January 1, 2023 (Note: Previously appointed by Governor Greg Abbott (R) as Associate Justice (Place 5) from July 23, 2020–December 31, 2020.)	2028	2038	Republican	—N/a (Note: Took office after being elected in a partisan election.)	South Texas
2	Jennifer Caughey	1981 or 1982 (age 44–45)	January 1, 2025 (Note: Previously appointed by Governor Greg Abbott (R) as Associate Justice (Place 9) from September 13, 2017 to December 31, 2018.)	2030	2058	Republican	—N/a	Harvard
3	Veronica Rivas-Molloy	1972 or 1973 (age 53–54)	January 1, 2021	2026	–	Democratic	—N/a	Houston
4	David Gunn	July 3, 1961 (age 65)	September 3, 2024	2026	2038	Republican	Greg Abbott (R)	Houston
5	Amparo Monique Guerra	1976 or 1977 (age 48–49)	January 1, 2021	2026	2054	Democratic	—N/a	Houston
6	Andrew Johnson	1980 or 1981 (age 45–46)	January 1, 2025	2030	2058	Republican	—N/a	St. Mary's
7	Clint Morgan	1980 or 1981 (age 45–46)	January 1, 2025	2030	2058	Republican	—N/a	UT
8	Vacant		October 1, 2026	2028				
9	Susanna Dokupil	1971 or 1972 (age 54–55)	January 1, 2025	2030	2048	Republican	—N/a	Harvard

=== Second Court of Appeals ===
The Second Court of Appeals of Texas, based in Fort Worth, hears appeals from the following counties: Archer, Clay, Cooke, Denton, Hood, Jack, Montague, Parker, Tarrant, Wichita, Wise, and Young. The court has seven justices.

Seat	Name	Born	Start	Next Election	Mandatory Retirement	Party	Appointer	Law School
1	Bonnie Sudderth, Chief Justice	September 2, 1959 (age 67)	January 7, 2015 (Note: Originally appointed by Governor Rick Perry (R) as Associate Justice (Place 4). Subsequently elevated by Governor Greg Abbott (R) as Chief Justice on October 5, 2017.)	2030	2034	Republican	Greg Abbott (R)	UT
2	Dana Womack	–	January 7, 2019	2026	–	Republican	Greg Abbott (R)	Baylor
3	Elizabeth Kerr	–	January 1, 2017	2028	–	Republican	—N/a	UT
4	Wade Birdwell	July 8, 1959 (age 67)	November 10, 2017	2030	2034	Republican	Greg Abbott (R)	Houston
5	Dabney Bassel	October 2, 1957 (age 69)	January 1, 2019	2030	2034	Republican	—N/a	Baylor
6	Mike Wallach	–	September 7, 2019	2030	–	Republican	Greg Abbott (R)	Houston
7	Brian Walker	1977 or 1978 (age 48–49)	January 1, 2021	2026	2054	Republican	—N/a	Houston

=== Third Court of Appeals ===
The Third Court of Appeals of Texas, based in Austin, hears appeals from the following counties: Bastrop, Bell, Blanco, Burnet, Caldwell, Coke, Comal, Concho, Fayette, Hays, Irion, Lampasas, Lee, Llano, McCulloch, Milam, Mills, Runnels, San Saba, Schleicher, Sterling, Tom Green, Travis, and Williamson. The court has six justices.

Seat	Name	Born	Start	Next Election	Mandatory Retirement	Party	Appointer	Law School
1	Darlene Byrne, Chief Justice	–	January 1, 2021	2026	–	Democratic	—N/a	Houston
2	Maggie Ellis	1968 or 1969 (age 57–58)	January 1, 2025	2030	–	Democratic	—N/a	Baylor
3	Chari Kelly	–	January 1, 2019	2030	–	Democratic	—N/a	UT
4	Rosa Lopez Theofanis	June 23, 1975 (age 51)	January 1, 2023	2028	2050	Democratic	—N/a	UT
5	Karin Crump	–	January 1, 2025	2030	–	Democratic	—N/a	St. Mary's
6	Gisela Triana	1966 or 1967 (age 59–60)	January 1, 2019	2030	2042	Democratic	—N/a	UT

=== Fourth Court of Appeals ===
The Fourth Court of Appeals of Texas, based in San Antonio, hears appeals from the following counties: Atascosa, Bandera, Bexar, Brooks, Dimmit, Duval, Edwards, Frio, Gillespie, Guadalupe, Jim Hogg, Jim Wells, Karnes, Kendall, Kerr, Kimble, Kinney, La Salle, Mason, Maverick, McMullen, Medina, Menard, Real, Starr, Sutton, Uvalde, Val Verde, Webb, Wilson, Zapata, and Zavala. The court has seven justices.

Seat	Name	Born	Start	Next Election	Mandatory Retirement	Party	Appointer	Law School
1	Rebeca Martinez, Chief Justice	1966 or 1967 (age 59–60)	January 1, 2019 (Note: Originally took office as Associate Justice (Place 7) after being elected in a partisan election. Subsequently elected as Chief Justice in 2020, and took office on January 1, 2021.)	2026	2042	Democratic	—N/a	Boston
2	Velia Meza	November 16, 1972 (age 54)	January 1, 2025	2030	2048	Democratic	—N/a	St. Mary's
3	Todd McCray	1962 or 1963 (age 63–64)	January 1, 2025	2030	2040	Republican	—N/a	St. Mary's
4	Lori Massey Brissette	1967 or 1968 (age 58–59)	July 8, 2024 (Note: Originally appointed as Associate Justice (Place 3) by Governor Greg Abbott (R). Subsequently elected as Associate Justice (Place 4) in 2024 and took office on January 1, 2025.)	2030	–	Republican	Greg Abbott (R)	South Texas
5	Adrian Spears	1974 or 1975 (age 51–52)	January 1, 2025	2030	2052	Republican	—N/a	St. Mary's
6	Irene Rios	1962 or 1963 (age 63–64)	January 1, 2017	2028	2038	Democratic	—N/a	St. Mary's
7	Lori Valenzuela	–	January 22, 2021	2030	–	Republican	Greg Abbott (R)	St. Mary's

=== Fifth Court of Appeals ===
The Fifth Court of Appeals of Texas, based in Dallas, hears appeals from the following counties: Collin, Dallas, Grayson, Hunt, Kaufman, and Rockwall. The court has thirteen justices.

Seat	Name	Born	Start	Next Election	Mandatory Retirement	Party	Appointer	Law School
1	J. J. Koch, Chief Justice	1978 or 1979 (age 47–48)	January 1, 2025	2030	2054	Republican	—N/a	SMU
2	Jessica Lewis	1980 or 1981 (age 45–46)	January 1, 2025	2030	2058	Republican	—N/a	SMU
3	Bonnie Lee Goldstein	1961 or 1962 (age 64–65)	January 1, 2021	2026	2036	Democratic	—N/a	George Washington
4	Maricela Moore	1975 or 1976 (age 50–51)	January 1, 2023	2028	2050	Democratic	—N/a	George Washington
5	Cynthia Barbare	1960 or 1961 (age 65–66)	January 1, 2025	2030	2036	Republican	—N/a	SMU
6	Craig Smith	1951 or 1952 (age 74–75)	January 1, 2021	2026	2026	Democratic	—N/a	Texas Tech
7	Nancy Kennedy	1975 or 1976 (age 49–50)	January 1, 2023	2028	2050	Democratic	—N/a	SMU
8	Dennise Garcia	1968 or 1969 (age 57–58)	January 1, 2021	2026	2044	Democratic	—N/a	SMU
9	Tina Clinton	1969 or 1970 (age 56–57)	January 1, 2025	2030	2046	Democratic	—N/a	SMU
10	Earl Jackson	–	January 1, 2025	2030	–	Republican	—N/a	Texas Wesleyan
11	Gino Rossini	1969 or 1970 (age 56–57)	January 1, 2025	2030	2046	Republican	—N/a	UT
12	Mike Lee	1959 or 1960 (age 66–67)	January 1, 2025	2030	–	Republican	—N/a	UT
13	Emily Miskel	1980 or 1981 (age 44–45)	December 26, 2022	2030	2058	Republican	Greg Abbott (R)	Harvard

=== Sixth Court of Appeals ===
The Sixth Court of Appeals of Texas, based in Texarkana, hears appeals from the following counties: Bowie, Camp, Cass, Delta, Fannin, Franklin, Gregg, Harrison, Hopkins, Hunt, Lamar, Marion, Morris, Panola, Red River, Rusk, Titus, Upshur, and Wood. The court has three justices.

Seat	Name	Born	Start	Next Election	Mandatory Retirement	Party	Appointer	Law School
1	Scott Stevens, Chief Justice	–	January 1, 2019 (Note: Originally elected as Associate Justice (Place 2). Subsequently elected as Chief Justice in 2022 and took office on January 1, 2023.)	2028	–	Republican	—N/a	South Texas
2	Jeff Rambin	September 16, 1968 (age 58)	January 1, 2023	2030	2046	Republican	Greg Abbott (R)	Baylor
3	Charles van Cleef	October 25, 1967 (age 59)	May 4, 2022	2026	2044	Republican	Greg Abbott (R)	South Texas

=== Seventh Court of Appeals ===
The Seventh Court of Appeals of Texas, based in Amarillo, hears appeals from the following counties: Armstrong, Bailey, Briscoe, Carson, Castro, Childress, Cochran, Collingsworth, Cottle, Crosby, Dallam, Deaf Smith, Dickens, Donley, Floyd, Foard, Garza, Gray, Hale, Hall, Hansford, Hardeman, Hartley, Hemphill, Hockley, Hutchinson, Kent, King, Lamb, Lipscomb, Lubbock, Lynn, Moore, Motley, Ochiltree, Oldham, Parmer, Potter, Randall, Roberts, Sherman, Swisher, Terry, Wheeler, Wilbarger, and Yoakum. The court has four justices.

Seat	Name	Born	Start	Next Election	Mandatory Retirement	Party	Appointer	Law School
1	Judy Parker, Chief Justice	September 6, 1960 (age 66)	August 17, 2017 (Note: Originally appointed as Associate Justice by Governor Greg Abbott (R). Subsequently appointed Chief Justice by Governor Abbott and took office on January 15, 2026.)	2026	2036	Republican	Greg Abbott (R)	Texas Tech
2	Laura Pratt	–	March 13, 2026	2026	–	Republican	Greg Abbott (R)	Texas Tech
3	Alex Yarbrough	–	August 24, 2022	2030	–	Republican	Greg Abbott (R)	Texas Tech
4	Larry Doss	August 22, 1968 (age 58)	November 1, 2019	2028	2044	Republican	Greg Abbott (R)	Texas Tech

=== Eighth Court of Appeals ===
The Eighth Court of Appeals of Texas, based in El Paso, hears appeals from the following counties: Andrews, Brewster, Crane, Crockett, Culberson, El Paso, Hudspeth, Jeff Davis, Loving, Pecos, Presidio, Reagan, Reeves, Terrell, Upton, Ward, and Winkler. The court has three justices.

Seat	Name	Born	Start	Next Election	Mandatory Retirement	Party	Appointer	Law School
1	Maria Salas-Mendoza, Chief Justice	–	January 1, 2025	2030	–	Democratic	—N/a	UCLA
2	Lisa Soto	1971 or 1972 (age 54–55)	January 1, 2023	2030	2046	Democratic	—N/a	UT
3	Gina Palafox	–	January 1, 2017	2030	–	Democratic	—N/a	Pepperdine

=== Ninth Court of Appeals ===
The Ninth Court of Appeals of Texas, based in Beaumont, hears appeals from the following counties: Hardin, Jasper, Jefferson, Liberty, Montgomery, Newton, Orange, Polk, San Jacinto, and Tyler. The court has four justices.

Seat	Name	Born	Start	Next Election	Mandatory Retirement	Party	Appointer	Law School
1	Scott Golemon, Chief Justice	1959 (age 66–67)	January 1, 2021	2026	2036	Republican	—N/a	Houston
2	Jay Wright	April 9, 1959 (age 67)	January 1, 2023	2028	2034	Republican	—N/a	Houston
3	Leanne Johnson	October 18, 1961 (age 65)	November 12, 2013	2030	2036	Republican	Rick Perry (R)	UA
4	Kent Chambers	–	July 1, 2024	2030	–	Republican	Greg Abbott (R)	Baylor

=== Tenth Court of Appeals ===
The Tenth Court of Appeals of Texas, based in Waco, hears appeals from the following counties: Bosque, Brazos, Burleson, Coryell, Ellis, Falls, Freestone, Hamilton, Hill, Johnson, Leon, Limestone, Madison, McLennan, Navarro, Robertson, Somervell, and Walker. The court has three justices.

Seat	Name	Born	Start	Next Election	Mandatory Retirement	Party	Appointer	Law School
1	Matt Johnson, Chief Justice	1962 or 1963 (age 63–64)	January 1, 2021 (Note: Originally elected as Associate Justice (Place 2). Subsequently elected as Chief Justice in 2024 and took office on January 1, 2025.)	2030	2038	Republican	—N/a	OCU
2	Lee Harris	1967 or 1968 (age 58–59)	January 6, 2025	2026	–	Republican	Greg Abbott (R)	Baylor
3	Andrea Westerfeld	1978 (age 47–48)	October 1, 2026	2028	2056	Republican	Greg Abbott (R)	Chicago-Kent

=== Eleventh Court of Appeals ===
The Eleventh Court of Appeals of Texas, based in Eastland, hears appeals from the following counties: Baylor, Borden, Brown, Callahan, Coleman, Comanche, Dawson, Eastland, Ector, Erath, Fisher, Gaines, Glasscock, Haskell, Howard, Jones, Knox, Martin, Midland, Mitchell, Nolan, Palo Pinto, Scurry, Shackelford, Stephens, Stonewall, Taylor, and Throckmorton. The court has three justices.

Seat	Name	Born	Start	Next Election	Mandatory Retirement	Party	Appointer	Law School
1	John Bailey, Chief Justice	–	October 31, 2013 (Note: Originally appointed as Associate Justice by Governor Rick Perry (R). Subsequently appointed by Governor Greg Abbott (R) and took office as Chief Justice on September 17, 2018.)	2030	–	Republican	Greg Abbott (R)	Texas Tech
2	Bruce Williams	January 15, 1955 (age 71)	January 1, 2021	2026	2030	Republican	—N/a	Texas Tech
3	Stacy Trotter	January 1, 1959 (age 67)	December 3, 2020	2028	2034	Republican	—N/a	Texas Tech

=== Twelfth Court of Appeals ===
The Twelfth Court of Appeals of Texas, based in Tyler, hears appeals from the following counties: Anderson, Angelina, Cherokee, Gregg, Henderson, Houston, Nacogdoches, Rains, Rusk, Sabine, San Augustine, Shelby, Smith, Trinity, Upshur, Van Zandt, and Wood. The court has three justices.

Seat	Name	Born	Start	Next Election	Mandatory Retirement	Party	Appointer	Law School
1	Jim Worthen, Chief Justice	May 21, 1954 (age 72)	January 1, 1999 (Note: Originally elected as Associate Justice in 1998. Subsequently elected as Chief Justice in 2002, and took office on January 1, 2003.)	2026	2030	Republican	—N/a	South Texas
2	Brian Hoyle	March 14, 1970 (age 56)	August 28, 2006	2028	2046	Republican	Rick Perry (R)	Baylor
3	Michael Davis	–	November 1, 2025	2026	–	Republican	Greg Abbott (R)	Texas Tech

=== Thirteenth Court of Appeals ===
The Thirteenth Court of Appeals of Texas, based in Corpus Christi and Edinburg, hears appeals from the following counties: Aransas, Bee, Calhoun, Cameron, DeWitt, Goliad, Gonzales, Hidalgo, Jackson, Kenedy, Kleberg, Lavaca, Live Oak, Matagorda, Nueces, Refugio, San Patricio, Victoria, Wharton, and Willacy. The court six three justices.

Seat	Name	Born	Start	Next Election	Mandatory Retirement	Party	Appointer	Law School
1	Jaime Tijerina, Chief Justice	September 12, 1963 (age 63)	July 24, 2019 (Note: Originally appointed as Associate Justice (Place 4) by Governor Greg Abbott (R). Subsequently elected as Chief Justice in 2024 and took office on January 1, 2025.)	2030	2040	Republican	Greg Abbott (R)	Texas Southern
2	Jenny Cron	–	January 1, 2025	2030	–	Republican	—N/a	Texas Tech
3	Aaron Peña	June 8, 1959 (age 67)	January 1, 2023	2028	2034	Republican	—N/a	Texas Southern
4	Ysmael Fonseca	–	January 1, 2025	2030	–	Republican	—N/a	Notre Dame
5	Jon West	–	January 1, 2025	2030	–	Republican	—N/a	St. Mary's
6	Clarissa Silva	April 15, 1982 (age 44)	January 1, 2021	2026	2060	Republican	—N/a	Texas Southern

=== Fourteenth Court of Appeals ===
The Fourteenth Court of Appeals of Texas, based in Houston, hears appeals from the following counties: Austin, Brazoria, Chambers, Colorado, Fort Bend, Galveston, Grimes, Harris, Waller, and Washington. The court shares jurisdiction over these counties with the First Court of Appeals. The court has nine justices.

Seat	Name	Born	Start	Next Election	Mandatory Retirement	Party	Appointer	Law School
1	Tracy Christopher, Chief Justice	July 17, 1956 (age 70)	December 2, 2009 (Note: Originally appointed as Associate Justice (Place 9) by Governor Rick Perry (R). Subsequently elected Chief Justice in 2020 and took office January 1, 2021.)	2026	2032	Republican	Rick Perry (R)	UT
2	Kevin Jewell	1967 or 1968 (age 58–59)	January 1, 2017	2028	2044	Republican	—N/a	Houston
3	Chad Bridges	1968 or 1969 (age 57–58)	January 1, 2025	2030	2046	Republican	—N/a	Houston
4	Tonya McLaughlin	1979 or 1980 (age 46–47)	January 1, 2025	2030	–	Republican	—N/a	South Texas
5	Maritza Antu	1979 or 1980 (age 46–47)	January 1, 2025	2030	–	Republican	—N/a	Houston
6	Katy Boatman	1981 or 1982 (age 44–45)	January 1, 2025	2030	2058	Republican	—N/a	Baylor
7	Ken Wise	1967 or 1968 (age 58–59)	October 11, 2013	2026	2044	Republican	Rick Perry (R)	Houston
8	Brad Hart	1970 or 1971 (age 55–56)	January 1, 2025	2030	2046	Republican	—N/a	South Texas
9	Randy Wilson	1951 or 1952 (age 74–75)	January 1, 2021	2028	2028	Republican	Greg Abbott (R)	Houston

=== Fifteenth Court of Appeals ===
The Fifteenth Court of Appeals of Texas, based in Austin, holds statewide jurisdiction over civil appeals to which the state is a party, appeals from the Texas Business Court, and constitutional challenges to Texas statutes. The court currently has three judges and is set to be expanded to five.

Seat	Name	Born	Start	Next Election	Mandatory Retirement	Party	Appointer	Law School
1	Scott Brister, Chief Justice	January 8, 1955 (age 71)	September 1, 2024	2026	2030	Republican	Greg Abbott (R)	Harvard
2	Scott Field	–	September 1, 2024	2026	–	Republican	Greg Abbott (R)	UT
3	April Farris	–	September 1, 2024	2026	–	Republican	Greg Abbott (R)	Harvard

== Opinion output and public access to opinions and orders ==
Collectively the Texas Courts of Appeals issue close to 10,000 opinions a year (9,909 in FY 2018) which are almost equally divided between civil and criminal cases. The number is high because appeals to these courts are "of right" and each case must be decided with an opinion, even if the disposition is in the form of a voluntary dismissal or an involuntary dismissal for noncompliance with briefing rules or a fatal jurisdictional defect.

Although the COA follow different conventions in the formatting of their opinions, all are issued in standard PDF and are posted on the COA's respective websites, where they can be looked up through the online docket sheet created for each case. The courts' Case Search portal allows searches by appellate case number, but also by party name and attorney name or bar number, and by other case attributes. Most COAs also make other documents filed in a case available online, including briefs, letters, and notices. The issued opinions can also be found on Google Scholar (CaseLaw) and on other repositories of appellate opinions. Google Scholar additionally includes procedural orders in its database, which are linked to the pages featuring the opinions by the hot-linked appellate case number. Whereas the courts issue majority and dissenting/concurring opinions as separate PDF documents, Google Scholar combines them into one page and displays onscreen in a larger font and more user-friendly format, in addition to providing much better search functionality and hotlinks to cited cases if they are available from its database.

=== Dissents and concurrences ===
Only about 1% of the issued COA opinions are dissents. Concurrences (separate opinions in which a justice agrees with the disposition, but not with the reasons for it, or only in part) accounted for 1% in 2018, up from 0.5% the previous year. The proportion of dissents and concurrences was only slightly higher in 2019, 1.9% for concurrences (including opinions concurring and dissenting) and 2% for dissents. Similar numbers followed in 2020.

Party affiliation and mixed composition are not the only sources of disagreement that manifest themselves in dissents. Kem Thompson Frost, the Chief Justice of the Fourteenth Court of Appeals, is known as an independent thinker and prolific dissenter. She wrote a total of 21 concurring or dissenting opinions in FY 2018 while her counterpart in the First Court of Appeals, Chief Justice Sherry Radack, wrote none. Both presided over all-Republican courts, although one member on the First Court who had been elected as a Republican, Justice Terry Jennings, switched to the Democrats and also wrote large number of separate opinions (19).

Statewide, there were 175 dissents and concurrences in Fiscal Year 2018, out of a total of 6,540 merits opinions. The total tally was 9,909, which includes per curiam opinions. As seen by the data for the Houston Courts of Appeals, individual justices can have a big impact on their respective court's comparative ranking, and on the statewide total.

By definition, a dissent in the Court of Appeals does not decide the case. Dissents (and concurrences) are nevertheless important because they typically highlight unsettled areas of the law or splits among the Courts of Appeals, and increase the chance that Texas Supreme Court will exercise discretionary review if a petition is filed in a case that drew a dissent in the Court of Appeals.
