= Scott Brister =

American judge

Scott Andrew Brister
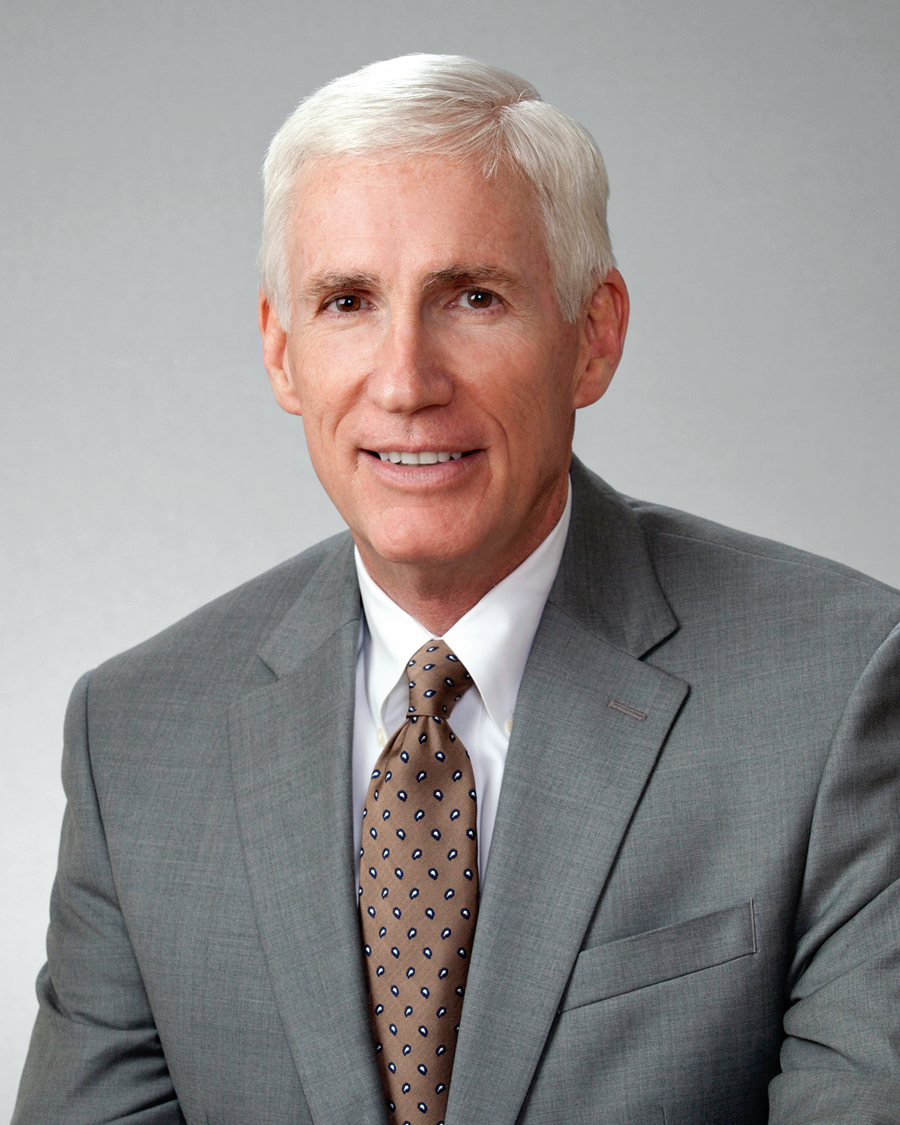
- Brister in 2012

Chief Justice of the 15th District Court of Appeals
- Incumbent
- Assumed office September 1, 2024
- Preceded by: Office established

Justice of the Texas Supreme Court
- In office November 21, 2003 – September 7, 2009
- Preceded by: Craig T. Enoch
- Succeeded by: Eva Guzman

Personal details
- Born: January 8, 1955 (age 71) Waco, Texas, U.S.
- Party: Republican
- Spouse: Julie Upton Brister
- Children: 4
- Education: Duke University; Harvard Law School
- Occupation: Lawyer; judge
- Website: Office website Campaign website

Scott Andrew Brister (born January 8, 1955) is an American lawyer serving as the chief justice of Texas's Fifteenth Court of Appeals since 2024. A member of the Republican Party, he served as an associate justice of the Supreme Court of Texas from 2003 to 2009. He also worked in private practice from 2009 to 2024.

== Background ==
Brister is a native of Waco, Texas. He is a 1977 summa cum laude graduate of Duke University in Durham, North Carolina, and the 1980 cum laude graduate of Harvard Law School in Cambridge, Massachusetts. In 1989, he was appointed judge of the 234th District Court in Harris County, Texas by Governor Bill Clements and presided over that court until the end of 2000. He was also local administrative judge for the Harris County civil district courts in 1998–1999.

He was elected to the First Court of Appeals of Texas, in 2000. He served on the First Court for less than two years before Perry appointed him chief justice of the Fourteenth Court of Appeals of Texas in 2001. He was elected to that position in 2002 and served the first eleven months of that term before he was appointed to the Texas Supreme Court.

He has home schooled all four of his daughters with wife Julie Upton Brister. He has four siblings: Robin Brister, Susan Brister, Michal Adams, and Steven Brister. The Bristers live in Georgetown, Texas. Brister, a Republican, was appointed to chair the Texas Commission on Public School Finance by Governor Greg Abbott in 2017.

== Notable opinions ==
- Neely v. West Orange-Cove Consolidated Independent School District (dissenting from judgment holding Texas school financing plan unconstitutional)

Legal offices
Preceded by Craig T. Enoch	Texas Supreme Court Justice, Place 9; 2003–2009	Succeeded by Eva Guzman
