= Texas District Courts =

Trial courts in Texas, United States

The Texas District Courts form part of the Texas judicial system and are the trial courts of general jurisdiction of Texas. As of January 2025, 510 district courts serve the state, each with a single judge, elected by partisan election to a four-year term.

District courts have original jurisdiction in all felony criminal cases, divorce cases, land title disputes, election contests, civil matters in which at least $200 is disputed or claimed in damages, as well as other matters. Most district courts consider both criminal and civil cases but, in counties with many courts, each may specialize in civil, criminal, juvenile, or family law matters.

The Texas tradition of one judge per district court is descended from what was the dominant form of American state trial court organization for much of the 19th century, which Texas wrote into its state constitution. Although the relevant constitutional clause was amended in 1985 to no longer require one judge per court, the tradition had become thoroughly entrenched.

Districts can cover a single county or several counties, with many districts overlapping one another. Harris County, the state's most populous, is home to 67 district courts - each one covering the entire county. While district courts can exercise concurrent jurisdiction over an entire county, and they can and do share courthouses and clerks to save money (as allowed under an 1890 Texas Supreme Court case), each is still legally constituted as a separate court. This is dramatically different from the situation in most U.S. states (or most other jurisdictions), in which a single trial court is staffed by multiple judges, each of whom has authority to act in the name of that court.

In sparsely populated areas, a single district can cover numerous counties: several districts span five counties, for example. Some counties share numerous overlapping districts.

On June 9, 2023, Texas' governor signed an Act into law creating a trial level business court, the Texas Business Court, as well as the first appellate level business court in the United States. The new law became effective in September 2023. On June 28, 2024, the Texas Supreme Court approved rules of procedure for the new Business Court. In June 2024, the Governor began appointing Business Court Division judges. In August 2024, the Texas Supreme Court rejected a constitutional challenge to the appellate business court's creation. The trial and appellate business courts will be open for cases on September 1, 2024. This new court is a separate statutory court, and not a division of the district court. Thus, it will remove some types of cases from the dockets of the district courts where the new business court is operational.

== Counties containing the most district courts ==
The following data is accurate as of January 2026.

County	Largest city	District courts
Harris County	Houston	67
Dallas County	Dallas	32
Bexar County	San Antonio	27
Tarrant County	Fort Worth	24
Travis County	Austin	21
El Paso County	El Paso	16
Collin County	Plano	15
Hidalgo County	McAllen	13
Denton County	Denton	12
Fort Bend County	Sugar Land	10
Cameron County	Brownsville	9
Montgomery County	Conroe	8
Nueces County	Corpus Christi	8

== Counties served by each district court ==
The following data is accurate as of 26 August 2026. Some courts which will be active in the future are listed.

Court	Counties served
1st Judicial District Court	Jasper, Newton, Sabine, San Augustine
Judicial District 1-A Court	Jasper, Newton, Tyler
2nd Judicial District Court	Cherokee
3rd Judicial District Court	Anderson, Henderson, Houston
4th Judicial District Court	Rusk
5th Judicial District Court	Bowie, Cass
6th Judicial District Court	Lamar, Red River
7th Judicial District Court	Smith
8th Judicial District Court	Delta, Franklin, Hopkins, Rains
9th Judicial District Court	Montgomery
10th Judicial District Court	Galveston
11th Judicial District Court	Harris
12th Judicial District Court	Grimes, Madison, Walker
13th Judicial District Court	Navarro
14th Judicial District Court	Dallas
15th Judicial District Court	Grayson
16th Judicial District Court	Denton
17th Judicial District Court	Tarrant
18th Judicial District Court	Johnson, Somervell
19th Judicial District Court	McLennan
20th Judicial District Court	Milam
21st Judicial District Court	Bastrop, Burleson, Lee, Washington
22nd Judicial District Court	Caldwell, Comal, Hays
23rd Judicial District Court	Matagorda, Wharton
24th Judicial District Court	Calhoun, DeWitt, Goliad, Jackson, Refugio, Victoria
25th Judicial District Court	Colorado, Gonzales, Guadalupe, Lavaca
26th Judicial District Court	Williamson
27th Judicial District Court	Bell, Lampasas
28th Judicial District Court	Nueces
29th Judicial District Court	Palo Pinto
30th Judicial District Court	Wichita
31st Judicial District Court	Gray, Hemphill, Lipscomb, Roberts, Wheeler
32nd Judicial District Court	Fisher, Mitchell, Nolan
33rd Judicial District Court	Blanco, Burnet, Llano, San Saba
34th Judicial District Court	El Paso
35th Judicial District Court	Brown, Mills
36th Judicial District Court	Aransas, Bee, Live Oak, McMullen, San Patricio
37th Judicial District Court	Bexar
38th Judicial District Court	Real, Uvalde
39th Judicial District Court	Haskell, Kent, Stonewall, Throckmorton
40th Judicial District Court	Ellis
41st Judicial District Court	El Paso
42nd Judicial District Court	Callahan, Coleman, Taylor
43rd Judicial District Court	Parker
44th Judicial District Court	Dallas
45th Judicial District Court	Bexar
46th Judicial District Court	Foard, Hardeman, Wilbarger
47th Judicial District Court	Armstrong, Potter, Randall
48th Judicial District Court	Tarrant
49th Judicial District Court	Webb, Zapata
50th Judicial District Court	Baylor, Cottle, King, Knox
51st Judicial District Court	Coke, Irion, Schleicher, Sterling, Tom Green
52nd Judicial District Court	Coryell
53rd Judicial District Court	Travis
54th Judicial District Court	McLennan
55th Judicial District Court	Harris
56th Judicial District Court	Galveston
57th Judicial District Court	Bexar
58th Judicial District Court	Jefferson
59th Judicial District Court	Grayson
60th Judicial District Court	Jefferson
61st Judicial District Court	Harris
62nd Judicial District Court	Delta, Franklin, Hopkins, Lamar
63rd Judicial District Court	Kinney, Terrell, Val Verde
64th Judicial District Court	Castro, Hale, Swisher
65th Judicial District Court	El Paso
66th Judicial District Court	Hill
67th Judicial District Court	Tarrant
68th Judicial District Court	Dallas
69th Judicial District Court	Dallam, Hartley, Moore, Sherman
70th Judicial District Court	Ector
71st Judicial District Court	Harrison
72nd Judicial District Court	Crosby, Lubbock
73rd Judicial District Court	Bexar
74th Judicial District Court	McLennan
75th Judicial District Court	Liberty
76th Judicial District Court	Camp, Morris, Titus
77th Judicial District Court	Freestone, Limestone
78th Judicial District Court	Wichita
79th Judicial District Court	Brooks, Jim Wells
80th Judicial District Court	Harris
81st Judicial District Court	Atascosa, Frio, Karnes, La Salle, Wilson
82nd Judicial District Court	Falls, Robertson
83rd Judicial District Court	Pecos, Terrell, Val Verde
84th Judicial District Court	Hansford, Hutchinson, Ochiltree
85th Judicial District Court	Brazos
86th Judicial District Court	Kaufman
87th Judicial District Court	Anderson, Freestone, Leon, Limestone
88th Judicial District Court	Hardin, Tyler
89th Judicial District Court	Wichita
90th Judicial District Court	Stephens, Young
91st Judicial District Court	Eastland
92nd Judicial District Court	Hidalgo
93rd Judicial District Court	Hidalgo
94th Judicial District Court	Nueces
95th Judicial District Court	Dallas
96th Judicial District Court	Tarrant
97th Judicial District Court	Archer, Clay, Montague
98th Judicial District Court	Travis
99th Judicial District Court	Lubbock
100th Judicial District Court	Carson, Childress, Collingsworth, Donley, Hall
101st Judicial District Court	Dallas
102nd Judicial District Court	Bowie, Red River
103rd Judicial District Court	Cameron
104th Judicial District Court	Taylor
105th Judicial District Court	Kenedy, Kleberg, Nueces
106th Judicial District Court	Dawson, Gaines, Garza, Lynn
107th Judicial District Court	Cameron
108th Judicial District Court	Potter
109th Judicial District Court	Andrews, Crane, Winkler
110th Judicial District Court	Briscoe, Dickens, Floyd, Motley
111th Judicial District Court	Webb
112th Judicial District Court	Crockett, Pecos, Reagan, Sutton, Upton
113th Judicial District Court	Harris
114th Judicial District Court	Smith
115th Judicial District Court	Marion, Upshur
116th Judicial District Court	Dallas
117th Judicial District Court	Nueces
118th Judicial District Court	Glasscock, Howard, Martin
119th Judicial District Court	Concho, Runnels, Tom Green
120th Judicial District Court	El Paso
121st Judicial District Court	Terry, Yoakum
122nd Judicial District Court	Galveston
123rd Judicial District Court	Panola, Shelby
124th Judicial District Court	Gregg
125th Judicial District Court	Harris
126th Judicial District Court	Travis
127th Judicial District Court	Harris
128th Judicial District Court	Orange
129th Judicial District Court	Harris
130th Judicial District Court	Matagorda
131st Judicial District Court	Bexar
132nd Judicial District Court	Borden, Scurry
133rd Judicial District Court	Harris
134th Judicial District Court	Dallas
135th Judicial District Court	Calhoun, DeWitt, Goliad, Jackson, Refugio, Victoria
136th Judicial District Court	Jefferson
137th Judicial District Court	Lubbock
138th Judicial District Court	Cameron
139th Judicial District Court	Hidalgo
140th Judicial District Court	Lubbock
141st Judicial District Court	Tarrant
142nd Judicial District Court	Midland
143rd Judicial District Court	Loving, Reeves, Ward
144th Judicial District Court	Bexar
145th Judicial District Court	Nacogdoches
146th Judicial District Court	Bell
147th Judicial District Court	Travis
148th Judicial District Court	Nueces
149th Judicial District Court	Brazoria
150th Judicial District Court	Bexar
151st Judicial District Court	Harris
152nd Judicial District Court	Harris
153rd Judicial District Court	Tarrant
154th Judicial District Court	Lamb
155th Judicial District Court	Austin, Fayette
156th Judicial District Court	Aransas, Bee, Live Oak, McMullen, San Patricio
157th Judicial District Court	Harris
158th Judicial District Court	Denton
159th Judicial District Court	Angelina
160th Judicial District Court	Dallas
161st Judicial District Court	Ector
162nd Judicial District Court	Dallas
163rd Judicial District Court	Orange
164th Judicial District Court	Harris
165th Judicial District Court	Harris
166th Judicial District Court	Bexar
167th Judicial District Court	Travis
168th Judicial District Court	El Paso
169th Judicial District Court	Bell
170th Judicial District Court	McLennan
171st Judicial District Court	El Paso
172nd Judicial District Court	Jefferson
173rd Judicial District Court	Henderson
174th Judicial District Court	Harris
175th Judicial District Court	Bexar
176th Judicial District Court	Harris
177th Judicial District Court	Harris
178th Judicial District Court	Harris
179th Judicial District Court	Harris
180th Judicial District Court	Harris
181st Judicial District Court	Potter, Randall
182nd Judicial District Court	Harris
183rd Judicial District Court	Harris
184th Judicial District Court	Harris
185th Judicial District Court	Harris
186th Judicial District Court	Bexar
187th Judicial District Court	Bexar
188th Judicial District Court	Gregg
189th Judicial District Court	Harris
190th Judicial District Court	Harris
191st Judicial District Court	Dallas
192nd Judicial District Court	Dallas
193rd Judicial District Court	Dallas
194th Judicial District Court	Dallas
195th Judicial District Court	Dallas
196th Judicial District Court	Hunt
197th Judicial District Court	Cameron, Willacy
198th Judicial District Court	Bandera, Kerr
199th Judicial District Court	Collin
200th Judicial District Court	Travis
201st Judicial District Court	Travis
202nd Judicial District Court	Bowie
203rd Judicial District Court	Dallas
204th Judicial District Court	Dallas
205th Judicial District Court	Culberson, El Paso, Hudspeth
206th Judicial District Court	Hidalgo
207th Judicial District Court	Caldwell, Comal, Hays
208th Judicial District Court	Harris
209th Judicial District Court	Harris
210th Judicial District Court	El Paso
211th Judicial District Court	Denton
212th Judicial District Court	Galveston
213th Judicial District Court	Tarrant
214th Judicial District Court	Nueces
215th Judicial District Court	Harris
216th Judicial District Court	Gillespie, Kerr
217th Judicial District Court	Angelina
218th Judicial District Court	Atascosa, Frio, Karnes, LaSalle, Wilson
219th Judicial District Court	Collin
220th Judicial District Court	Bosque, Comanche, Hamilton
221st Judicial District Court	Montgomery
222nd Judicial District Court	Deaf Smith, Oldham
223rd Judicial District Court	Gray
224th Judicial District Court	Bexar
225th Judicial District Court	Bexar
226th Judicial District Court	Bexar
227th Judicial District Court	Bexar
228th Judicial District Court	Harris
229th Judicial District Court	Duval, Jim Hogg, Starr
230th Judicial District Court	Harris
231st Judicial District Court	Tarrant
232nd Judicial District Court	Harris
233rd Judicial District Court	Tarrant
234th Judicial District Court	Harris
235th Judicial District Court	Cooke
236th Judicial District Court	Tarrant
237th Judicial District Court	Lubbock
238th Judicial District Court	Midland
239th Judicial District Court	Brazoria
240th Judicial District Court	Fort Bend
241st Judicial District Court	Smith
242nd Judicial District Court	Castro, Hale, Swisher
243rd Judicial District Court	El Paso
244th Judicial District Court	Ector
245th Judicial District Court	Harris
246th Judicial District Court	Harris
247th Judicial District Court	Harris
248th Judicial District Court	Harris
249th Judicial District Court	Johnson, Somervell
250th Judicial District Court	Travis
251st Judicial District Court	Potter, Randall
252nd Judicial District Court	Jefferson
253rd Judicial District Court	Chambers, Liberty
254th Judicial District Court	Dallas
255th Judicial District Court	Dallas
256th Judicial District Court	Dallas
257th Judicial District Court	Harris
258th Judicial District Court	Polk, San Jacinto, Trinity
259th Judicial District Court	Jones, Shackelford
260th Judicial District Court	Orange
261st Judicial District Court	Travis
262nd Judicial District Court	Harris
263rd Judicial District Court	Harris
264th Judicial District Court	Bell
265th Judicial District Court	Dallas
266th Judicial District Court	Erath
267th Judicial District Court	Calhoun, DeWitt, Goliad, Jackson, Refugio, Victoria
268th Judicial District Court	Fort Bend
269th Judicial District Court	Harris
270th Judicial District Court	Harris
271st Judicial District Court	Jack, Wise
272nd Judicial District Court	Brazos
273rd Judicial District Court	Sabine, San Augustine, Shelby
274th Judicial District Court	Comal, Hays
275th Judicial District Court	Hidalgo
276th Judicial District Court	Camp, Marion, Morris, Titus
277th Judicial District Court	Williamson
278th Judicial District Court	Leon, Madison, Walker
279th Judicial District Court	Jefferson
280th Judicial District Court	Harris
281st Judicial District Court	Harris
282nd Judicial District Court	Dallas
283rd Judicial District Court	Dallas
284th Judicial District Court	Montgomery
285th Judicial District Court	Bexar
286th Judicial District Court	Cochran, Hockley
287th Judicial District Court	Bailey, Parmer
288th Judicial District Court	Bexar
289th Judicial District Court	Bexar
290th Judicial District Court	Bexar
291st Judicial District Court	Dallas
292nd Judicial District Court	Dallas
293rd Judicial District Court	Dimmit, Maverick, Zavala
294th Judicial District Court	Van Zandt
295th Judicial District Court	Harris
296th Judicial District Court	Collin
297th Judicial District Court	Tarrant
298th Judicial District Court	Dallas
299th Judicial District Court	Travis
300th Judicial District Court	Brazoria
301st Judicial District Court	Dallas
302nd Judicial District Court	Dallas
303rd Judicial District Court	Dallas
304th Judicial District Court	Dallas
305th Judicial District Court	Dallas
306th Judicial District Court	Galveston
307th Judicial District Court	Gregg
308th Judicial District Court	Harris
309th Judicial District Court	Harris
310th Judicial District Court	Harris
311th Judicial District Court	Harris
312th Judicial District Court	Harris
313th Judicial District Court	Harris
314th Judicial District Court	Harris
315th Judicial District Court	Harris
316th Judicial District Court	Hutchinson
317th Judicial District Court	Jefferson
318th Judicial District Court	Midland
319th Judicial District Court	Nueces
320th Judicial District Court	Potter
321st Judicial District Court	Smith
322nd Judicial District Court	Tarrant
323rd Judicial District Court	Tarrant
324th Judicial District Court	Tarrant
325th Judicial District Court	Tarrant
326th Judicial District Court	Taylor
327th Judicial District Court	El Paso
328th Judicial District Court	Fort Bend
329th Judicial District Court	Wharton
330th Judicial District Court	Dallas
331st Judicial District Court	Travis
332nd Judicial District Court	Hidalgo
333rd Judicial District Court	Harris
334th Judicial District Court	Harris
335th Judicial District Court	Bastrop, Burleson, Lee, Washington
336th Judicial District Court	Fannin
337th Judicial District Court	Harris
338th Judicial District Court	Harris
339th Judicial District Court	Harris
340th Judicial District Court	Tom Green
341st Judicial District Court	Webb
342nd Judicial District Court	Tarrant
343rd Judicial District Court	Aransas, Bee, Live Oak, McMullen, San Patricio
344th Judicial District Court	Chambers
345th Judicial District Court	Travis
346th Judicial District Court	El Paso
347th Judicial District Court	Nueces
348th Judicial District Court	Tarrant
349th Judicial District Court	Anderson, Houston
350th Judicial District Court	Taylor
351st Judicial District Court	Harris
352nd Judicial District Court	Tarrant
353rd Judicial District Court	Travis
354th Judicial District Court	Hunt, Rains
355th Judicial District Court	Hood
356th Judicial District Court	Hardin
357th Judicial District Court	Cameron
358th Judicial District Court	Ector
359th Judicial District Court	Montgomery
360th Judicial District Court	Tarrant
361st Judicial District Court	Brazos
362nd Judicial District Court	Denton
363rd Judicial District Court	Dallas
364th Judicial District Court	Lubbock
365th Judicial District Court	Dimmit, Maverick, Zavala
366th Judicial District Court	Collin
367th Judicial District Court	Denton
368th Judicial District Court	Williamson
369th Judicial District Court	Anderson, Cherokee, Leon
370th Judicial District Court	Hidalgo
371st Judicial District Court	Tarrant
372nd Judicial District Court	Tarrant
377th Judicial District Court	Victoria
378th Judicial District Court	Ellis
379th Judicial District Court	Bexar
380th Judicial District Court	Collin
381st Judicial District Court	Starr
382nd Judicial District Court	Rockwall
383rd Judicial District Court	El Paso
384th Judicial District Court	El Paso
385th Judicial District Court	Midland
386th Judicial District Court	Bexar
387th Judicial District Court	Fort Bend
388th Judicial District Court	El Paso
389th Judicial District Court	Hidalgo
390th Judicial District Court	Travis
391st Judicial District Court	Tom Green
392nd Judicial District Court	Henderson
393rd Judicial District Court	Denton
394th Judicial District Court	Brewster, Culberson, Hudspeth, Jeff Davis, Presidio
395th Judicial District Court	Williamson
396th Judicial District Court	Tarrant
397th Judicial District Court	Grayson
398th Judicial District Court	Hidalgo
399th Judicial District Court	Bexar
400th Judicial District Court	Fort Bend
401st Judicial District Court	Collin
402nd Judicial District Court	Wood
403rd Judicial District Court	Travis
404th Judicial District Court	Cameron
405th Judicial District Court	Galveston
406th Judicial District Court	Webb
407th Judicial District Court	Bexar
408th Judicial District Court	Bexar
409th Judicial District Court	El Paso
410th Judicial District Court	Montgomery
411th Judicial District Court	Polk, San Jacinto, Trinity
412th Judicial District Court	Brazoria
413th Judicial District Court	Johnson
414th Judicial District Court	McLennan
415th Judicial District Court	Parker
416th Judicial District Court	Collin
417th Judicial District Court	Collin
418th Judicial District Court	Montgomery
419th Judicial District Court	Travis
420th Judicial District Court	Nacogdoches
421st Judicial District Court	Caldwell
422nd Judicial District Court	Kaufman
423rd Judicial District Court	Bastrop
424th Judicial District Court	Blanco, Burnet, Llano, San Saba
425th Judicial District Court	Williamson
426th Judicial District Court	Bell
427th Judicial District Court	Travis
428th Judicial District Court	Hays
429th Judicial District Court	Collin
430th Judicial District Court	Hidalgo
431st Judicial District Court	Denton
432nd Judicial District Court	Tarrant
433rd Judicial District Court	Comal
434th Judicial District Court	Fort Bend
435th Judicial District Court	Montgomery
436th Judicial District Court	Bexar
437th Judicial District Court	Bexar
438th Judicial District Court	Bexar
439th Judicial District Court	Rockwall
440th Judicial District Court	Coryell
441st Judicial District Court	Midland
442nd Judicial District Court	Denton
443rd Judicial District Court	Ellis
444th Judicial District Court	Cameron
445th Judicial District Court	Cameron
446th Judicial District Court	Ector
448th Judicial District Court	El Paso
449th Judicial District Court	Hidalgo
450th Judicial District Court	Travis
451st Judicial District Court	Kendall
452nd Judicial District Court	Edwards, Kimble, McCulloch, Mason, Menard
453rd Judicial District Court	Hays
454th Judicial District Court	Medina
455th Judicial District Court	Travis
456th Judicial District Court	Guadalupe
457th Judicial District Court	Montgomery
458th Judicial District Court	Fort Bend
459th Judicial District Court	Travis
460th Judicial District Court	Travis
461st Judicial District Court	Brazoria
462nd Judicial District Court	Denton
464th Judicial District Court	Hidalgo
465th Judicial District Court	Bastrop
466th Judicial District Court	Comal
467th Judicial District Court	Denton
468th Judicial District Court	Collin
469th Judicial District Court	Collin
470th Judicial District Court	Collin
471st Judicial District Court	Collin
472nd Judicial District Court	Brazos
474th Judicial District Court	McLennan
475th Judicial District Court	Smith
476th Judicial District Court	Hidalgo
477th Judicial District Court	Denton
478th Judicial District Court	Bell
480th Judicial District Court	Williamson
481st Judicial District Court	Denton
482nd Judicial District Court	Harris
483rd Judicial District Court	Hays
484th Judicial District Court	Cameron
485th Judicial District Court	Tarrant
486th Judicial District Court	Harris
487th Judicial District Court	Harris
488th Judicial District Court	Harris
489th Judicial District Court	Kaufman
490th Judicial District Court	Hidalgo
492nd Judicial District Court	Colorado, Lavaca
493rd Judicial District Court	Collin
494th Judicial District Court	Collin
495th Judicial District Court	Harris
496th Judicial District Court	Harris
497th Judicial District Court	Harris
498th Judicial District Court	Kendall
501st Judicial District Court	Fort Bend
502nd Judicial District Court	Fort Bend
503rd Judicial District Court	Rockwall
504th Judicial District Court	Ellis
505th Judicial District Court	Fort Bend
506th Judicial District Court	Grimes, Waller
507th Judicial District Court	Harris
509th Judicial District Court	Harris
510th Judicial District Court	Harris
511th Judicial District Court	Comal
512th Judicial District Court	Williamson
513th Judicial District Court	Harris
514th Judicial District Court	Harris
515th Judicial District Court	Harris
516th Judicial District Court	Harris
517th Judicial District Court	Harris
521st Judicial District Court	Travis
522nd Judicial District Court	Gonzales, Guadalupe
523rd Judicial District Court	Montgomery

The 373rd, 374th, 375th, 376th, 447th, 463rd, 473rd, 479th, 491st, 499th, 500th, 508th, 518th, 519th, and 520th districts do not exist.
