= 2026 United States judicial elections =

United States judicial elections are scheduled to be held in 2026, in various states and territories across the country, for both supreme courts and appellate courts. Justices are elected across the country in partisan, nonpartisan, and retention elections.

== Nonpartisan elections ==
=== Arkansas ===
==== Supreme Court ====
Position	Incumbent	First elected	Status	Candidates
3	J. Cody Hiland	2023 (Note: Appointed by Governor Sarah Huckabee Sanders)	Incumbent re-elected outright after the March 3, 2026, general election was cancelled.	▌ ✓ J. Cody Hiland
6	Nicholas Bronni	2025	Incumbent re-elected March 3, 2026.	▌ ✓ Nicholas Bronni 54.7%; ▌John Adams 45.3%

==== Court of Appeals ====
Position	Incumbent	First elected	Status	Candidates
District 2, Position 1	Bart Virden	2014	Incumbent re-elected outright after the March 3, 2026, general election was cancelled.	▌ ✓ Bart Virden
District 3, Position 1	Robert J. Gladwin	2002	Incumbent retired. New member elected March 3, 2026.	▌ ✓ Sarah Capp 63.0%; ▌Brandon Carter 37.0%

=== Georgia ===
==== Supreme Court ====
Position	Incumbent	First elected	Status	Candidates
At-large	Sarah Hawkins Warren	2018 (Note: Appointed by Governor Nathan Deal)	Incumbent re-elected May 19, 2026.	▌ ✓ Sarah Hawkins Warren 59.3%; ▌Jen Jordan 40.7%
At-large	Charlie Bethel	2018	Incumbent re-elected May 19, 2026.	▌ ✓ Charlie Bethel 51.1%; ▌Miracle Rankin 48.9%
At-large (special)	Benjamin Land	2025 (Note: Appointed by Governor Brian Kemp)	Incumbent re-elected May 19, 2026.	▌ ✓ Benjamin Land

==== Court of Appeals ====
Position	Incumbent	First elected	Status	Candidates
At-large	E. Trenton Brown III	2018	Incumbent re-elected May 19, 2026.	▌ ✓ E. Trenton Brown III 63.8%; ▌Will Wooten 36.2%
At-large	Sara L. Doyle	2008	Incumbent re-elected May 19, 2026.	▌ ✓ Sara L. Doyle
At-large	Elizabeth Gobeil	2018	Incumbent re-elected May 19, 2026.	▌ ✓ Elizabeth Gobeil 56.5%; ▌Fatima Harris Felton 43.5%
At-large	Todd Markle	2018	Incumbent re-elected May 19, 2026.	▌ ✓ Todd Markle
At-large	J. Wade Padgett	2024	Incumbent re-elected May 19, 2026.	▌ ✓ J. Wade Padgett

=== Idaho ===
==== Supreme Court ====
Position	Incumbent	First elected	Status	Candidates
District C	Gregory W. Moeller	2019 (Note: Appointed by Governor Butch Otter)	Incumbent re-elected May 19, 2026.	▌ ✓ Gregory W. Moeller
District E	Cynthia Meyer	2023 (Note: Appointed by Governor Brad Little)	Incumbent re-elected May 19, 2026.	▌ ✓ Cynthia Meyer

==== Court of Appeals ====
Position	Incumbent	First elected	Status	Candidates
District D	Michael Patrick Tribe	2024	Incumbent re-elected May 19, 2026.	▌ ✓ Michael Patrick Tribe

=== Kentucky ===
==== Supreme Court ====
Position	Incumbent	First elected	Status	Candidates
District 3	Debra H. Lambert	2018	Incumbent re-elected November 3, 2026.	▌ ✓ Debra H. Lambert

==== Court of Appeals ====
Position	Incumbent	First elected	Status	Candidates
District 3, Division 2 (special)	Vacant	—	New member elected November 3, 2026.	▌ ✓ Greg Lay
District 5, Division 1 (special)	Will Moynahan	2025 (Note: Appointed by Governor Andy Beshear)	Incumbent lost election. New member elected November 3, 2026.	▌ ✓ Lucy Ferguson VanMeter 58.6%; ▌Will Moynahan 41.4%

=== Michigan ===
==== Supreme Court ====
Position	Incumbent	Party	First elected	Status	Candidates
At-large	Megan Cavanagh	Democratic	2018	Incumbent re-elected November 3, 2026.	▌ ✓ Megan Cavanagh 34.2%; ▌ ✓ Noah Hood 29.5%; ▌Michael D. Warren Jr. 13.7%; ▌Casandra Morse-Bills 12.6%; ▌Jody White 5.3%; ▌Thomas Howe 4.7%
At-large	Noah Hood	Democratic	2025 (Note: Appointed by Governor Gretchen Whitmer)	Incumbent elected November 3, 2026.	▌ ✓ Megan Cavanagh 34.2%; ▌ ✓ Noah Hood 29.5%; ▌Michael D. Warren Jr. 13.7%; ▌Casandra Morse-Bills 12.6%; ▌Jody White 5.3%; ▌Thomas Howe 4.7%

==== Court of Appeals ====
Position	Incumbent	First elected	Status	Candidates
1	Christopher M. Murray	2002 (Note: Appointed by Governor John Engler)	Incumbent re-elected November 3, 2026.	▌ ✓ Christopher M. Murray 37.3%; ▌ ✓ Mariam Bazzi 36.7%; ▌ ✓ Anica Letica 26.0%
1	Anica Letica	2018 (Note: Appointed by Governor Rick Snyder)	Incumbent re-elected November 3, 2026.	▌ ✓ Christopher M. Murray 37.3%; ▌ ✓ Mariam Bazzi 36.7%; ▌ ✓ Anica Letica 26.0%
1	Mariam Bazzi	2025	Incumbent re-elected November 3, 2026.	▌ ✓ Christopher M. Murray 37.3%; ▌ ✓ Mariam Bazzi 36.7%; ▌ ✓ Anica Letica 26.0%
1 (special)	Andrew Lievense	2026	Incumbent elected November 3, 2026.	▌ ✓ Andrew Lievense
2	Sima G. Patel	2022	Incumbent re-elected. To be elected November 3, 2026.	▌ ✓ Christopher M. Trebilcock 50.6%; ▌ ✓ Sima G. Patel 49.4%
2	Christopher M. Trebilcock	2025	Incumbent re-elected. To be elected November 3, 2026.	▌ ✓ Christopher M. Trebilcock 50.6%; ▌ ✓ Sima G. Patel 49.4%
3	Mark T. Boonstra	2012	Incumbent re-elected. To be elected November 3, 2026.	▌ ✓ Mark T. Boonstra 52.0%; ▌ ✓ Daniel S. Korobkin 48.0%
3	Daniel S. Korobkin	2025	Incumbent re-elected. To be elected November 3, 2026.	▌ ✓ Mark T. Boonstra 52.0%; ▌ ✓ Daniel S. Korobkin 48.0%
4	Michael J. Kelly	2009	Incumbent re-elected. To be elected November 3, 2026.	▌ ✓ Michael J. Kelly 38.1%; ▌ ✓ Allie Greenleaf Maldonado 31.4%; ▌ ✓ Michelle M. Rick 30.5%
4	Michelle M. Rick	2025	Incumbent re-elected. To be elected November 3, 2026.	▌ ✓ Michael J. Kelly 38.1%; ▌ ✓ Allie Greenleaf Maldonado 31.4%; ▌ ✓ Michelle M. Rick 30.5%
4	Allie Greenleaf Maldonado	2023	Incumbent re-elected. To be elected November 3, 2026.	▌ ✓ Michael J. Kelly 38.1%; ▌ ✓ Allie Greenleaf Maldonado 31.4%; ▌ ✓ Michelle M. Rick 30.5%

=== Minnesota ===
==== Supreme Court ====
Position	Incumbent	First elected	Status	Candidates
Seat 1	Sarah Hennesy	2024 (Note: Appointed by Governor Tim Walz)	Incumbent re-elected November 3, 2026.	▌ ✓ Sarah Hennesy
Seat 4	Paul Thissen	2018 (Note: Appointed by Governor Mark Dayton)	Incumbent re-elected November 3, 2026.	▌ ✓ Paul Thissen

==== Court of Appeals ====
Position	Incumbent	First elected	Status	Candidates
1	Elizabeth Bentley	2024	Incumbent re-elected November 3, 2026.	▌ ✓ Elizabeth Bentley
7	Rachel Bond	2025	Incumbent re-elected November 3, 2026.	▌ ✓ Rachel Bond
13	Jeanne Cochran	2018	Incumbent re-elected November 3, 2026.	▌ ✓ Jeanne Cochran
15	Kevin Ross	2006 (Note: Appointed by Governor Tim Pawlenty)	Incumbent re-elected November 3, 2026.	▌ ✓ Kevin Ross
18	JaPaul Harris	2024	Incumbent re-elected November 3, 2026.	▌ ✓ JaPaul Harris

=== Mississippi ===
==== Court of Appeals ====
Position	Incumbent	First elected	Status	Candidates
District 1, Position 1 (special)	John D. Weddle	2024 (Note: Appointed by Governor Tate Reeves)	Incumbent re-elected November 3, 2026.	▌ ✓ John D. Weddle 58.8%; ▌ Derek Hopson Jr. 41.2%
District 1, Position 2	Donna M. Barnes	2004 (Note: Appointed by Governor Haley Barbour)	Incumbent re-elected November 3, 2026.	▌ ✓ Donna M. Barnes
District 2, Position 1	Deborah McDonald	2018	Incumbent re-elected November 3, 2026.	▌ ✓ Deborah McDonald
District 4, Position 2	David Neil McCarty	2018	Incumbent re-elected November 3, 2026.	▌ ✓ David Neil McCarty
District 5, Position 1	Anthony Lawrence	2018	Incumbent re-elected November 3, 2026.	▌ ✓ Anthony Lawrence

=== Montana ===
==== Supreme Court ====
Position	Incumbent	First elected	Status	Candidates
At-large	Beth Baker	2010	Incumbent retired. New member elected November 3, 2026.	▌ ✓ Amy Eddy 59.2%; ▌Dan Wilson 40.8%

=== Nevada ===
==== Supreme Court ====
Position	Incumbent	First elected	Status	Candidates
Seat B	Kristina Pickering	2008	Incumbent re-elected November 3, 2026.	▌ ✓ Kristina Pickering
Seat D	Douglas W. Herndon	2020	Incumbent re-elected November 3, 2026.	▌ ✓ Douglas W. Herndon

=== North Dakota ===
==== Supreme Court ====
Position	Incumbent	First elected	Status	Candidates
At-large	Jerod E. Tufte	2016	Incumbent re-elected November 3, 2026.	▌ ✓ Jerod E. Tufte 65.2%; ▌Ariston Johnson 34.8%
At-large	Douglas Bahr	2023 (Note: Appointed by Governor Doug Burgum)	Incumbent re-elected November 3, 2026.	▌ ✓ Douglas Bahr

=== Oregon ===
==== Supreme Court ====
Position	Incumbent	First elected	Status	Candidates
At-large	Christopher L. Garrett	2019 (Note: Appointed by Governor Kate Brown)	Incumbent re-elected November 3, 2026.	▌ ✓ Christopher L. Garrett

==== Court of Appeals ====
Position	Incumbent	First elected	Status	Candidates
1	Ryan O'Connor	2025 (Note: Appointed by Governor Tina Kotek)	Incumbent re-elected November 3, 2026.	▌ ✓ Ryan O'Connor
9	Jacqueline S. Kamins	2020	Incumbent re-elected November 3, 2026.	▌ ✓ Jacqueline S. Kamins
12	Erin C. Lagesen	2013 (Note: Appointed by Governor John Kitzhaber)	Incumbent re-elected November 3, 2026.	▌ ✓ Erin C. Lagesen
13	Douglas L. Tookey	2013	Incumbent re-elected November 3, 2026.	▌ ✓ Douglas L. Tookey

=== Washington ===
==== Supreme Court ====
Position	Incumbent	First elected	Status	Candidates
Seat 1 (special)	Colleen Melody	2025 (Note: Appointed by Governor Bob Ferguson)	Incumbent re-elected November 3, 2026.	▌ ✓ Colleen Melody 60.1%; ▌Scott Edwards 39.9%
Seat 3	Raquel Montoya-Lewis	2020 (Note: Appointed by Governor Jay Inslee)	Incumbent retired. New member elected November 3, 2026.	▌ ✓ Jaime Hawk 57.9%; ▌David Stevens 42.1%
Seat 4	Charles W. Johnson	1990	Incumbent ineligible. New member elected November 3, 2026.	▌ ✓ Sean O'Donnell 50.6%; ▌Ian Birk 49.4%
Seat 5 (special)	Theo Angelis	2026	Incumbent re-elected November 3, 2026.	▌ ✓ Theo Angelis 55.9%; ▌Dave Larson 44.1%
Seat 7	Debra L. Stephens	2008 (Note: Appointed by Governor Christine Gregoire)	Incumbent re-elected November 3, 2026.	▌ ✓ Debra L. Stephens 63.6%; ▌Todd Bloom 36.4%

==== Court of Appeals ====
Position	Incumbent	First elected	Status	Candidates
Division I, District 1, Position 5	David S. Mann	2016	Incumbent re-elected November 3, 2026.	▌ ✓ David S. Mann
Division I, District 1, Position 6	Bill Bowman	2020	Incumbent re-elected November 3, 2026.	▌ ✓ Bill Bowman
Division I, District 2, Position 2	Linda Coburn	2020	Incumbent re-elected November 3, 2026.	▌ ✓ Linda Coburn
Division II, District 1, Position 2	Meng Li Che	2022	Incumbent re-elected November 3, 2026.	▌ ✓ Meng Li Che
Division II, District 2, Position 1	Erik D. Price	2021	Incumbent re-elected November 3, 2026.	▌ ✓ Erik D. Price
Division III, District 1, Position 2	Tracy Staab	2020	Incumbent re-elected November 3, 2026.	▌ ✓ Tracy Staab
Division III, District 2, Position 1 (special)	Tyson R. Hill	2026	Incumbent re-elected November 3, 2026.	▌ ✓ Tyson R. Hill
Division III, District 3, Position 1	Megan K. Murphy	2025	Incumbent re-elected November 3, 2026.	▌ ✓ Megan K. Murphy

=== West Virginia ===
==== Supreme Court of Appeals ====
Position	Incumbent	First elected	Status	Candidates
Division 1 (special)	Gerald Titus	2025 (Note: Appointed by Governor Patrick Morrisey)	Incumbent lost re-election. New member elected May 12, 2026.	▌ ✓ H. L. Kirkpatrick 31.0%; ▌Gerald Titus 26.4%; ▌Laura V. Faircloth 20.9%; ▌Todd Kirby 12.7%; ▌Martin Sheehan 9.0%
Division 2 (special)	Thomas Ewing	2025	Incumbent lost re-election. New member elected May 12, 2026.	▌ ✓ Bill Flanigan 58.2%; ▌Thomas Ewing 41.8%

==== Intermediate Court of Appeals ====
Position	Incumbent	First elected	Status	Candidates
At-large	Daniel W. Greear	2022 (Note: Appointed by Governor Jim Justice)	Incumbent lost re-election. New member elected May 12, 2026.	▌ ✓ Jim Douglas 58.9%; ▌Daniel W. Greear 41.1%

=== Wisconsin ===
==== Supreme Court ====
Position	Incumbent	Appointed	Status	Candidates
At-large	Rebecca Bradley	2015 (Note: Appointed by Governor Scott Walker)	Incumbent retired. New member elected April 7, 2026.	▌ ✓ Chris Taylor 60.1%; ▌Maria S. Lazar 39.8%

==== Court of Appeals ====
Position	Incumbent	Appointed	Status	Candidates
District I	M. Joseph Donald	2019 Appointed by Governor Tony Evers	Incumbent re-elected April 7, 2026.	▌ ✓ M. Joseph Donald
District II	Lisa Neubauer	2008 Appointed by Governor Jim Doyle	Incumbent retired. New member elected April 7, 2026	▌ ✓ Anthony LoCoco
District IV	Rachel A. Graham	2019 Appointed by Governor Tony Evers	Incumbent re-elected April 7, 2026.	▌ ✓ Rachel A. Graham

== Partisan elections ==
=== Alabama ===
==== Supreme Court ====
Position	Incumbent	Party	First elected	Status	Candidates
Place 7	Brady E. Mendheim Jr.	Republican	2018 (Note: Appointed by Governor Kay Ivey)	Incumbent re-elected November 3, 2026.	▌ ✓ Brady E. Mendheim Jr. (Republican)
Place 8	Greg Shaw	Republican	2008	Incumbent re-elected November 3, 2026.	▌ ✓ Greg Shaw (Republican) 54.7%; ▌AshLeigh Meyer Dunham (Democratic) 45.3%

==== Civil Appeals ====
Position	Incumbent	Party	First elected	Status	Candidates
Place 4	Benjamin M. Bowden	Republican	2025	Incumbent re-elected November 3, 2026.	▌ ✓ Benjamin M. Bowden (Republican)
Place 5	Matt Fridy	Republican	2020	Incumbent re-elected November 3, 2026.	▌ ✓ Matt Fridy (Republican)

==== Criminal Appeals ====
Position	Incumbent	Party	First elected	Status	Candidates
Place 4	Mary Windom	Republican	2008	Incumbent re-elected November 3, 2026.	▌ ✓ Mary Windom (Republican)
Place 5	Beth Kellum	Republican	2008	Incumbent retired. New member elected November 3, 2026. Republican hold.	▌ ✓ Riggs Walker (Republican)

=== Illinois ===
==== Appellate Court ====
District	Incumbent	Party	First appointed	Status	Candidates
1	LeRoy K. Martin	Nonpartisan	2025	Incumbent retired. New member elected November 3, 2026. Democratic gain.	▌ ✓ Judith C. Rice (Democratic)
3	Joseph P. Hettel	Democratic	2025	Incumbent retired. New member elected November 3, 2026. Democratic hold.	▌ ✓ Margaret O'Connell (Democratic) 59.6%; ▌Jason Helland (Republican) 40.4%
5	James Hackett	Republican	2025	Incumbent retired. New member elected November 3, 2026. Republican hold.	▌ ✓ Amy Sholar (Republican)

=== Louisiana ===
==== Supreme Court ====
Position	Incumbent	First elected	Party	Status	Candidates
District 1 (special)	Allison Penzato	2025	Republican	Incumbent retired. New member elected outright after the December 12, 2026, general election was cancelled. Republican hold.	▌ ✓ William "Billy" Burris (Republican)
District 3	Cade Cole	2025 (Note: Appointed by Governor Jeff Landry)	Republican	Incumbent re-elected outright after the December 12, 2026, general election was cancelled. Republican hold.	▌ ✓ Cade Cole (Republican)
District 4	Jay McCallum	2020	Republican	Incumbent re-elected outright after the December 12, 2026, general election was cancelled. Republican hold.	▌ ✓ Jay McCallum (Republican)

==== Circuit Courts of Appeal ====
Position	Incumbent	First elected	Party	Status	Candidates
Circuit 2, District 2	Jeff Cox	2016	Republican	Incumbent re-elected outright after the December 12, 2026, general election was cancelled. Republican hold.	▌ ✓ Jeff Cox
Circuit 3, District 1	Shannon J. Gremillion	2008	Republican	Incumbent re-elected outright after the December 12, 2026, general election was cancelled. Republican hold.	▌ ✓ Shannon J. Gremillion
Circuit 3, District 1	Van H. Kyzar	2016	Democratic	Incumbent retired. New member elected outright after the December 12, 2026, general election was cancelled. Republican gain.	▌ ✓ Greg Beard
Circuit 4, District 1	Rachael Johnson	2022	Democratic	Incumbent re-elected outright after the December 12, 2026, general election was cancelled. Democratic hold.	▌ ✓ Rachael Johnson

=== New Mexico ===
==== Court of Appeals ====
Position	Incumbent	Party	First elected	Status	Candidates
At-large	Kristopher Houghton	Democratic	2025 (Note: Appointed by Governor Michelle Lujan Grisham)	Incumbent re-elected November 3, 2026.	▌ ✓ Kristopher Houghton (Democratic)

=== North Carolina ===
==== Supreme Court ====
Position	Incumbent	Party	First elected	Status	Candidates
Seat 1	Anita Earls	Democratic	2018	Incumbent re-elected November 3, 2026.	▌ ✓ Anita Earls (Democratic) 58.9%; ▌Sarah Stevens (Republican) 41.1%

==== Court of Appeals ====
Position	Incumbent	Party	First elected	Status	Candidates
Seat 1	John S. Arrowood	Democratic	2017 (Note: Appointed by Governor Roy Cooper)	Incumbent re-elected November 3, 2026.	▌ ✓ John S. Arrowood (Democratic) 56.8%; ▌Michael Byrne (Republican) 43.2%
Seat 2	Toby Hampson	Democratic	2018	Incumbent re-elected November 3, 2026.	▌ ✓ Toby Hampson (Democratic) 56.8%; ▌George Cooper Bell (Republican) 43.2%
Seat 3	Allegra Collins	Democratic	2018	Incumbent retired. New member elected November 3, 2026. Democratic hold.	▌ ✓ Christine Walczyk (Democratic) 57.1%; ▌Craig Collins (Republican) 42.9%

=== Ohio ===
==== Supreme Court ====
Position	Incumbent	Party	First elected	Status	Candidates
At-large	Jennifer Brunner	Democratic	2020	Incumbent re-elected November 3, 2026.	▌ ✓ Jennifer Brunner (Democratic) 51.1%; ▌Colleen O’Donnell (Republican) 48.9%
At-large	Daniel R. Hawkins	Republican	2024	Incumbent lost re-election November 3, 2026. Democratic gain.	▌ ✓ Marilyn Zayas (Democratic) 51.0%; ▌Daniel R. Hawkins (Republican) 49.0%

==== District Courts of Appeals ====
Position	Incumbent	Party	First elected	Status	Candidates
1	Ginger Bock	Democratic	2020	Incumbent re-elected November 3, 2026.	▌ ✓ Ginger Bock (Democratic)
2	Chris Epley	Republican	2020	Incumbent re-elected November 3, 2026.	▌ ✓ Chris Epley (Republican)
3	Mark Miller	Republican	2020	Incumbent re-elected November 3, 2026.	▌ ✓ Mark Miller (Republican)
4	Vacant		2026	Incumbent died after renomination. New member elected November 3, 2026. Republican gain.	▌ ✓ Jayme Hartley Fountain (Republican) 64.0%; ▌Todd L. Grace (Democratic) 36.0%
5	William Hoffman	Democratic	1990	Incumbent retired. New member elected November 3, 2026. Republican gain.	▌ ✓ Matthew George (Republican)
6	Thomas Osowik	Democratic	2006	Incumbent retired. New member elected November 3, 2026. Republican gain.	▌ ✓ Michael R. Goulding (Republican)
6	Myron C. Duhart	Democratic	2020	Incumbent re-elected November 3, 2026.	▌ ✓ Myron C. Duhart (Democratic) 52.9%; ▌CJ Kamm (Republican) 47.1%
7	Carol Ann Robb	Republican	2014	Incumbent retired. New member elected November 3, 2026. Republican hold.	▌ ✓ Mark Anthony Hanni (Republican) 56.9%; ▌Katherine Rudzik (Democratic) 43.1%
7	Cheryl L. Waite	Democratic	1996	Incumbent retired. New member elected November 3, 2026. Republican gain.	▌ ✓ Molly K. Johnson (Republican)
8	Michael John Ryan	Democratic	2022	Incumbent re-elected November 3, 2026.	▌ ✓ Michael John Ryan (Democratic)
8	Emanuella Groves	Democratic	2020	Incumbent re-elected November 3, 2026.	▌ ✓ Emanuella Groves (Democratic)
8	Sean Gallagher	Democratic	2002	Incumbent retired. New member elected November 3, 2026. Democratic hold.	▌ ✓ Jeffrey Crossman (Democratic)
8	Anita Laster Mays	Democratic	2014	Incumbent re-elected November 3, 2026.	▌ ✓ Anita Laster Mays (Democratic) 72.5%; ▌Anthony Alto (Republican) 27.5%
8 (special)	Timothy Clary	Republican	2026 (Note: Appointed by Governor Mike DeWine)	Incumbent retired. New member elected November 3, 2026. Democratic gain.	▌ ✓ Ashley Kilbane (Democratic)
9	Betty Sutton	Democratic	2020	Incumbent re-elected November 3, 2026.	▌ ✓ Betty Sutton (Democratic) 55.6%; ▌Cynthia Curtin (Republican) 44.4%
9 (special)	Nathan Manning	Republican	2026	Incumbent lost election November 3, 2026. Democratic gain.	▌ ✓ Tavia Galonski (Democratic) 51.8%; ▌Nathan Manning (Republican) 48.2%
10	Terri Jamison	Democratic	2020	Incumbent re-elected November 3, 2026.	▌ ✓ Terri Jamison (Democratic)
10	Michael Mentel	Democratic	2020	Incumbent re-elected November 3, 2026.	▌ ✓ Michael Mentel (Democratic)
11	Matt Lynch	Republican	2018	Incumbent retired. New member elected November 3, 2026. Republican hold.	▌ ✓ Marisa L. Cornachio (Republican)
11	Robert J. Patton	Republican	2023	Incumbent re-elected November 3, 2026.	▌ ✓ Robert J. Patton (Republican)
12	Robert Hendrickson	Republican	2008	Incumbent re-elected November 3, 2026.	▌ ✓ Robert Hendrickson (Republican)
12	Matthew Byrne	Republican	2020	Incumbent re-elected November 3, 2026.	▌ ✓ Matthew Byrne (Republican)

=== Texas ===
==== Supreme Court ====
Position	Incumbent	Party	First elected	Status	Candidates
Place 1	Jimmy Blacklock	Republican	2025 (Note: Appointed by Governor Greg Abbott)	Incumbent lost re-election November 3, 2026. Democratic gain.	▌ ✓ Maggie Ellis (Democratic) 52.5%; ▌Jimmy Blacklock (Republican) 47.5%
Place 2 (special)	James P. Sullivan	Republican	2025	Incumbent lost re-election November 3, 2026. Democratic gain.	▌ ✓ Chari Kelly (Democratic) 52.3%; ▌James P. Sullivan (Republican) 47.7%
Place 7	Kyle D. Hawkins	Republican	2025	Incumbent lost re-election November 3, 2026. Democratic gain.	▌ ✓ Kristen Hawkins (Democratic) 52.8%; ▌Kyle D. Hawkins (Republican) 47.2%
Place 8	J. Brett Busby	Republican	2019	Incumbent lost re-election November 3, 2026. Democratic gain.	▌ ✓ Gisela Triana (Democratic) 52.0%; ▌J. Brett Busby (Republican) 48.0%

==== Court of Criminal Appeals ====
Position	Incumbent	Party	First elected	Status	Candidates
Place 3	Bert Richardson	Republican	2014	Incumbent retired. New member elected November 3, 2026. Democratic gain.	▌ ✓ Okey Anyiam (Democratic) 50.0%; ▌Thomas Smith (Republican) 47.6%; ▌Mark Ash (Libertarian) 2.4%
Place 4	Kevin Yeary	Republican	2014	Incumbent lost re-election November 3, 2026. Democratic gain.	▌ ✓ Audra Riley (Democratic) 51.8%; ▌Kevin Yeary (Republican) 48.2%
Place 9	David Newell	Republican	2014	Incumbent retired. New member elected November 3, 2026. Democratic gain.	▌ ✓ Holly Taylor (Democratic) 52.3%; ▌John Messinger (Republican) 47.7%

==== Courts of Appeals ====
Position	Incumbent	Party	First elected	Status	Candidates
District 1, Place 3	Veronica Rivas-Molloy	Democratic	2020	Incumbent re-elected November 3, 2026.	▌ ✓ Veronica Rivas-Molloy (Democratic) 58.7%; ▌Todd Frankfort (Republican) 41.3%
District 1, Place 4 (special)	David Gunn	Republican	2024	Incumbent lost re-election November 3, 2026. Democratic gain.	▌ ✓ Julie Countiss (Democratic) 57.5%; ▌David Gunn (Republican) 42.5%
District 1, Place 5	Amparo Monique Guerra	Democratic	2020	Incumbent re-elected November 3, 2026.	▌ ✓ Amparo Monique Guerra (Democratic) 58.7%; ▌Jessica Caird (Republican) 41.3%
District 2, Place 2	Dana Womack	Republican	2019	Incumbent retired. New member elected November 3, 2026. Republican hold.	▌ ✓ Chris Taylor (Republican)
District 2, Place 7	Brian Walker	Republican	2020	Incumbent re-elected November 3, 2026.	▌ ✓ Brian Walker (Republican)
District 3, Chief Justice	Darlene Byrne	Democratic	2020	Incumbent re-elected November 3, 2026.	▌ ✓ Darlene Byrne (Democratic) 59.4%; ▌Cory Liu (Republican) 40.6%
District 4, Chief Justice	Rebeca Martinez	Democratic	2020	Incumbent retired. New member elected November 3, 2026. Democratic hold.	▌ ✓ Antonia Arteaga (Democratic) 57.6%; ▌Bert Richardson (Republican) 42.4%
District 5, Place 3	Bonnie Lee Goldstein	Democratic	2020	Incumbent retired. New member elected November 3, 2026. Democratic hold.	▌ ✓ Amanda Reichek (Democratic) 59.2%; ▌Matthew Kolodoski (Republican) 40.8%
District 5, Place 6	Craig Smith	Democratic	2020	Incumbent retired. New member elected November 3, 2026. Democratic hold.	▌ ✓ Monica Purdy (Democratic) 58.8%; ▌Benjamin N. Smith (Republican) 41.2%
District 5, Place 8	Dennise Garcia	Democratic	2020	Incumbent retired. New member elected November 3, 2026. Democratic hold.	▌ ✓ Andrea Plumlee (Democratic) 58.5%; ▌Ashley Wysocki (Republican) 41.5%
District 6, Place 3	Charles van Cleef	Republican	2022	Incumbent re-elected November 3, 2026.	▌ ✓ Charles van Cleef (Republican)
District 7, Chief Justice	Brian Quinn	Republican	1995 (Note: Appointed by Governor Rick Perry)	Incumbent retired. New member elected November 3, 2026. Republican hold.	▌ ✓ Judy Parker (Republican)
District 7, Place 2 (special)	Laura Pratt	Republican	2026	Incumbent re-elected November 3, 2026.	▌ ✓ Laura Pratt (Republican)
District 8, Chief Justice	Maria Salas-Mendoza	Democratic	2024	Incumbent re-elected November 3, 2026.	▌ ✓ Maria Salas-Mendoza (Democratic)
District 9, Chief Justice	Scott Golemon	Republican	1995	Incumbent re-elected November 3, 2026.	▌ ✓ Scott Golemon (Republican)
District 10, Place 2	Lee Harris	Republican	2025	Incumbent re-elected November 3, 2026.	▌ ✓ Lee Harris (Republican)
District 11, Place 2	Bruce Williams	Republican	2020	Incumbent re-elected November 3, 2026.	▌ ✓ Bruce Williams (Republican)
District 12, Chief Justice	James T. Worthen	Republican	1998	Incumbent retired. New member elected November 3, 2026. Republican hold.	▌ ✓ Brian Hoyle (Republican)
District 12, Place 3 (special)	Michael Davis	Republican	2025	Incumbent re-elected November 3, 2026.	▌ ✓ Michael Davis (Republican)
District 13, Place 6	Clarissa Silva	Republican	2020	Incumbent lost re-election November 3, 2026. Democratic gain.	▌ ✓ John Ball (Democratic) 55.8%; ▌Clarissa Silva (Republican) 44.2%
District 14, Chief Justice	Tracy Christopher	Republican	2020	Incumbent retired. New member elected November 3, 2026. Democratic gain.	▌ ✓ Sarah Beth Landau (Democratic) 58.4%; ▌Kevin Jewell (Republican) 41.6%
District 14, Place 7	Ken Wise	Republican	2013	Incumbent lost re-election November 3, 2026. Democratic gain.	▌ ✓ William Demond (Democratic) 57.0%; ▌Ken Wise (Republican) 43.0%
District 15, Chief Justice	Scott Brister	Republican	2024	Incumbent lost re-election November 3, 2026. Democratic gain.	▌ ✓ Jerry Zimmerer (Democratic) 51.8%; ▌Scott Brister (Republican) 48.2%
District 15, Place 2	Scott Field	Republican	2024	Incumbent lost re-election November 3, 2026. Democratic gain.	▌ ✓ Thomas Baker (Democratic) 52.0%; ▌Scott Field (Republican) 48.0%
District 15, Place 3	April Farris	Republican	2024	Incumbent lost re-election November 3, 2026. Democratic gain.	▌ ✓ Marc Meyer (Democratic) 51.5%; ▌April Farris (Republican) 48.5%

== Retention elections ==
=== Alaska ===
One justice of the five-member Alaska Supreme Court, 18 judges of the 45-member Alaska Superior Court, and six of the 20 judges on the Alaska District Court are up for retention by Alaska voters on November 3, 2026. Terms for Supreme Court are ten years, terms for Superior Court are six years, and terms for District Court are four years. These elections are nonpartisan.

=== Arizona ===
One justice of the seven-member Arizona Supreme Court, 14 judges of the 28-member Arizona Court of Appeals, and 65 of the 183 judges on the Arizona Superior Court are up for retention on November 3, 2026. Terms for Supreme Court and Court of Appeals are six years and terms for Superior Court are four years. These elections are nonpartisan.

=== California ===
==== Supreme Court ====
Position	Incumbent	Party	First elected	Status	Vote
At-large	Joshua Groban	Nonpartisan	2019 (Note: Appointed by Governor Jerry Brown)	Incumbent retained in retention vote held November 3, 2026.	✓ Yes 71.3%; No 28.7%
At-large	Kelli Evans	Nonpartisan	2023 (Note: Appointed by Governor Gavin Newsom)	Incumbent retained in retention vote held November 3, 2026.	✓ Yes 72.3%; No 27.7%

==== Courts of Appeal ====
Position	Incumbent	Party	First elected	Status	Vote
District 1, Division 1 (special)	Charles A. Smiley	Nonpartisan	2025	Incumbent retained in retention vote held November 3, 2026.	✓ Yes 79.6%; No 20.4%
District 1, Division 1	Kathleen M. Banke	Nonpartisan	2009 (Note: Appointed by Governor Arnold Schwarzenegger)	Incumbent retained in retention vote held November 3, 2026.	✓ Yes 80.3%; No 19.7%
District 1, Division 1 (special)	Monique Langhorne Wilson	Nonpartisan	2024	Incumbent retained in retention vote held November 3, 2026.	✓ Yes 81.5%; No 18.5%
District 1, Division 2	Tara M. Desautels	Nonpartisan	2024	Incumbent retained in retention vote held November 3, 2026.	✓ Yes 80.1%; No 19.9%
District 1, Division 2	Theresa M. Stewart	Nonpartisan	2014	Incumbent retained in retention vote held November 3, 2026.	✓ Yes 80.8%; No 19.2%
District 1, Division 3	Victor Rodriguez	Nonpartisan	2021	Incumbent retained in retention vote held November 3, 2026.	✓ Yes 80.1%; No 19.9%
District 1, Division 3	Ioana Petrou	Nonpartisan	2018	Incumbent retained in retention vote held November 3, 2026.	✓ Yes 78.7%; No 21.3%
District 1, Division 4	Tracie L. Brown	Nonpartisan	2018	Incumbent retained in retention vote held November 3, 2026.	✓ Yes 81.7%; No 18.3%
District 1, Division 5	Mark Simons	Nonpartisan	2001 (Note: Appointed by Governor Gray Davis)	Incumbent retained in retention vote held November 3, 2026.	✓ Yes 78.0%; No 22.0%
District 1, Division 5 (special)	Danny Y. Chou	Nonpartisan	2023	Incumbent retained in retention vote held November 3, 2026.	✓ Yes 79.8%; No 20.2%
District 1, Division 5	Gordon B. Burns	Nonpartisan	2018	Incumbent retained in retention vote held November 3, 2026.	✓ Yes 78.7%; No 21.3%
District 2, Division 1 (special)	Michelle C. Kim	Nonpartisan	2024	Incumbent retained in retention vote held November 3, 2026.	✓ Yes 76.6%; No 23.4%
District 2, Division 1	Gregory J. Weingart	Nonpartisan	2022	Incumbent retained in retention vote held November 3, 2026.	✓ Yes 66.5%; No 33.5%
District 2, Division 2	Anne Richardson	Nonpartisan	2024	Incumbent retained in retention vote held November 3, 2026.	✓ Yes 77.4%; No 22.6%
District 2, Division 2 (special)	Stephen Goorvitch	Nonpartisan	2026	Incumbent retained in retention vote held November 3, 2026.	✓ Yes 64.9%; No 35.1%
District 2, Division 3 (special)	Mark K. Hanasono	Nonpartisan	2025	Incumbent retained in retention vote held November 3, 2026.	✓ Yes 75.2%; No 24.8%
District 2, Division 3	Rashida A. Adams	Nonpartisan	2023	Incumbent retained in retention vote held November 3, 2026.	✓ Yes 75.3%; No 24.7%
District 2, Division 4 (special)	Nicholas Daum	Nonpartisan	2026	Incumbent retained in retention vote held November 3, 2026.	✓ Yes 71.0%; No 29.0%
District 2, Division 4 (special)	Armen Tamzarian	Nonpartisan	2025	Incumbent retained in retention vote held November 3, 2026.	✓ Yes 69.5%; No 30.5%
District 2, Division 4 (special)	Audra M. Mori	Nonpartisan	2023	Incumbent retained in retention vote held November 3, 2026.	✓ Yes 72.8%; No 27.2%
District 2, Division 4 (special)	Helen Zukin	Nonpartisan	2023	Incumbent retained in retention vote held November 3, 2026.	✓ Yes 74.6%; No 25.4%
District 2, Division 5 (special)	Brian M. Hoffstadt	Nonpartisan	2024	Incumbent retained in retention vote held November 3, 2026.	✓ Yes 67.8%; No 32.2%
District 2, Division 6	Kenneth R. Yegan	Nonpartisan	1990 (Note: Appointed by Governor George Deukmejian)	Incumbent retained in retention vote held November 3, 2026.	✓ Yes 64.1%; No 35.9%
District 2, Division 6 (special)	Tari L. Cody	Nonpartisan	2023	Incumbent retained in retention vote held November 3, 2026.	✓ Yes 76.0%; No 24.0%
District 2, Division 7	Gonzalo Martinez	Nonpartisan	2023	Incumbent retained in retention vote held November 3, 2026.	✓ Yes 75.7%; No 24.3%
District 2, Division 7	Natalie P. Stone	Nonpartisan	2024	Incumbent retained in retention vote held November 3, 2026.	✓ Yes 75.2%; No 24.8%
District 2, Division 8	Victor Viramontes	Nonpartisan	2022	Incumbent retained in retention vote held November 3, 2026.	✓ Yes 75.6%; No 24.4%
District 2, Division 8	John Shepard Wiley, Jr.	Nonpartisan	2018	Incumbent retained in retention vote held November 3, 2026.	✓ Yes 68.2%; No 31.8%
District 2, Division 8 (special)	Matthew Scherb	Nonpartisan	2025	Incumbent retained in retention vote held November 3, 2026.	✓ Yes 73.1%; No 26.9%
District 3	Aimee Feinberg	Nonpartisan	2024	Incumbent retained in retention vote held November 3, 2026.	✓ Yes 64.3%; No 35.7%
District 3	Jonathan K. Renner	Nonpartisan	2014	Incumbent retained in retention vote held November 3, 2026.	✓ Yes 66.2%; No 33.8%
District 3 (special)	Lauri Damrell	Nonpartisan	2026	Incumbent retained in retention vote held November 3, 2026.	✓ Yes 65.2%; No 34.8%
District 3 (special)	Laurie M. Earl	Nonpartisan	2022	Incumbent retained in retention vote held November 3, 2026.	✓ Yes 68.0%; No 32.0%
District 3 (special)	Ronald Robie	Nonpartisan	2002	Incumbent retired. David Sapp elected in retention vote held November 3, 2026.	✓ Yes 62.2%; No 37.8%
District 3 (special)	Shama Haki Mesiwala	Nonpartisan	2023	Incumbent retained in retention vote held November 3, 2026.	✓ Yes 61.4%; No 38.6%
District 3	Stacy Boulware Eurie	Nonpartisan	2022	Incumbent retained in retention vote held November 3, 2026.	✓ Yes 66.5%; No 33.5%
District 4, Division 1	David M. Rubin	Nonpartisan	2023	Incumbent retained in retention vote held November 3, 2026.	✓ Yes 67.4%; No 32.6%
District 4, Division 1 (special)	Eran Marie Bermudez	Nonpartisan	2026	Incumbent retained in retention vote held November 3, 2026.	✓ Yes 68.2%; No 31.8%
District 4, Division 1 (special)	Jose S. Castillo	Nonpartisan	2023	Incumbent retained in retention vote held November 3, 2026.	✓ Yes 69.4%; No 30.6%
District 4, Division 1	Julia C. Kelety	Nonpartisan	2023	Incumbent retained in retention vote held November 3, 2026.	✓ Yes 69.2%; No 30.8%
District 4, Division 1	Terry B. O'Rourke	Nonpartisan	1988 (Note: Appointed by Governor Pete Wilson)	Incumbent retired. Lisa R. Rodriguez elected in retention vote held November 3, 2026.	✓ Yes 69.1%; No 30.9%
District 4, Division 1	Truc T. Do	Nonpartisan	2021	Incumbent retained in retention vote held November 3, 2026.	✓ Yes 62.5%; No 37.5%
District 4, Division 1	William S. Dato	Nonpartisan	2016	Incumbent retained in retention vote held November 3, 2026.	✓ Yes 74.2%; No 25.8%
District 4, Division 2 (special)	Corey Lee	Nonpartisan	2025	Incumbent retained in retention vote held November 3, 2026.	✓ Yes 67.9%; No 32.1%
District 4, Division 2	Michael J. Raphael	Nonpartisan	2018	Incumbent retained in retention vote held November 3, 2026.	✓ Yes 67.8%; No 32.2%
District 4, Division 3 (special)	Juliet O. Macaulay	Nonpartisan	2026	Incumbent retained in retention vote held November 3, 2026.	✓ Yes 65.2%; No 34.8%
District 4, Division 3 (special)	Nathan Scott	Nonpartisan	2025	Incumbent retained in retention vote held November 3, 2026.	✓ Yes 67.8%; No 32.2%
District 4, Division 3	Joanne Motoike	Nonpartisan	2022	Incumbent retained in retention vote held November 3, 2026.	✓ Yes 64.3%; No 35.7%
District 4, Division 3 (special)	Deborah C. Servino	Nonpartisan	2026	Incumbent retained in retention vote held November 3, 2026.	✓ Yes 69.0%; No 31.0%
District 4, Division 3 (special)	Thomas Delaney	Nonpartisan	2022	Incumbent retained in retention vote held November 3, 2026.	✓ Yes 67.7%; No 32.3%
District 4, Division 3	Martha K. Gooding	Nonpartisan	2023	Incumbent retained in retention vote held November 3, 2026.	✓ Yes 68.3%; No 31.7%
District 5	Kathleen Meehan	Nonpartisan	2017	Incumbent retained in retention vote held November 3, 2026.	✓ Yes 65.6%; No 34.4%
District 5	Mark W. Snauffer	Nonpartisan	2018	Incumbent retained in retention vote held November 3, 2026.	✓ Yes 62.0%; No 38.0%
District 5	Thomas DeSantos	Nonpartisan	2018	Incumbent retained in retention vote held November 3, 2026.	✓ Yes 65.9%; No 34.1%
District 5 (special)	Arlan L. Harrell	Nonpartisan	2025	Incumbent retained in retention vote held November 3, 2026.	✓ Yes 65.2%; No 34.8%
District 5 (special)	Amy Guerra	Nonpartisan	2026	Incumbent retained in retention vote held November 3, 2026.	✓ Yes 65.4%; No 34.6%
District 5 (special)	Sonny S. Sandhu	Nonpartisan	2026	Incumbent retained in retention vote held November 3, 2026.	✓ Yes 59.3%; No 40.7%
District 6	Charles E. Wilson	Nonpartisan	2021	Incumbent retained in retention vote held November 3, 2026.	✓ Yes 78.4%; No 21.6%
District 6	Daniel Bromberg	Nonpartisan	2023	Incumbent retained in retention vote held November 3, 2026.	✓ Yes 76.7%; No 23.3%
District 6	Adrienne M. Grover	Nonpartisan	2012	Incumbent retired. Frederick S. Chung elected in retention vote held November 3, 2026.	✓ Yes 78.0%; No 22.0%
District 6	Allison M. Danner	Nonpartisan	2018	Incumbent retained in retention vote held November 3, 2026.	✓ Yes 79.1%; No 20.9%
District 6	Charles Adams	Nonpartisan	2026	Incumbent retained in retention vote held November 3, 2026.	✓ Yes 77.2%; No 22.8%

=== Colorado ===
==== Supreme Court ====
Position	Incumbent	Party	First elected	Status	Vote
At-large	William W. Hood III	Nonpartisan	2014 (Note: Appointed by Governor John Hickenlooper)	Incumbent retained in retention vote held November 3, 2026.	✓ Yes 65.9%; No 34.1%

==== Court of Appeals ====
Position	Incumbent	Party	First elected	Status	Vote
At-large	Grant T. Sullivan	Nonpartisan	2024 (Note: Appointed by Governor Jared Polis)	Incumbent retained in retention vote held November 3, 2026.	✓ Yes 66.6%; No 33.4%
At-large	Karl L. Schock	Nonpartisan	2022	Incumbent retained in retention vote held November 3, 2026.	✓ Yes 67.4%; No 32.6%
At-large	Katharine E. Lum	Nonpartisan	2022	Incumbent retained in retention vote held November 3, 2026.	✓ Yes 68.5%; No 31.5%
At-large	Elizabeth L. Harris	Nonpartisan	2015	Incumbent retained in retention vote held November 3, 2026.	✓ Yes 67.1%; No 32.9%
At-large	Rebecca R. Freyre	Nonpartisan	2015	Incumbent retained in retention vote held November 3, 2026.	✓ Yes 68.7%; No 31.3%
At-large	Pax L. Moultrie	Nonpartisan	2024	Incumbent retained in retention vote held November 3, 2026.	✓ Yes 67.8%; No 32.2%

=== Florida ===
==== Supreme Court ====
Position	Incumbent	Party	First elected	Status	Vote
At-large	Carlos G. Muñiz	Nonpartisan	2019 (Note: Appointed by Governor Ron DeSantis)	Incumbent retained in retention vote held November 3, 2026.	✓ Yes 57.7%; No 42.3%

==== District Courts of Appeal ====
Position	Incumbent	Party	First elected	Status	Vote
1	Joseph Lewis Jr.	Nonpartisan	2001 (Note: Appointed by Governor Jeb Bush)	Incumbent retained in retention vote held November 3, 2026.	✓ Yes 60.7%; No 39.3%
1	Ray Treadwell	Nonpartisan	2025	Incumbent retained in retention vote held November 3, 2026.	✓ Yes 58.5%; No 41.5%
1	L. Clayton Roberts	Nonpartisan	2007 (Note: Appointed by Governor Charlie Crist)	Incumbent retained in retention vote held November 3, 2026.	✓ Yes 57.7%; No 42.3%
1	Timothy D. Osterhaus	Nonpartisan	2013 (Note: Appointed by Governor Rick Scott)	Incumbent retained in retention vote held November 3, 2026.	✓ Yes 57.9%; No 42.1%
1	Rachel E. Nordby	Nonpartisan	2019	Incumbent retained in retention vote held November 3, 2026.	✓ Yes 58.8%; No 41.2%
2	Morris Silberman	Nonpartisan	2001	Incumbent retained in retention vote held November 3, 2026.	✓ Yes 65.6%; No 34.4%
2	Daniel H. Sleet	Nonpartisan	2012	Incumbent retained in retention vote held November 3, 2026.	✓ Yes 62.4%; No 37.6%
2	J. Andrew Atkinson	Nonpartisan	2018	Incumbent retained in retention vote held November 3, 2026.	✓ Yes 62.3%; No 37.7%
2	Andrea Teves Smith	Nonpartisan	2019	Incumbent retained in retention vote held November 3, 2026.	✓ Yes 65.2%; No 34.8%
3	Thomas Logue	Nonpartisan	2012	Incumbent retained in retention vote held November 3, 2026.	✓ Yes 62.4%; No 37.6%
3	Kansas Gooden	Nonpartisan	2024	Incumbent retained in retention vote held November 3, 2026.	✓ Yes 59.4%; No 40.6%
3	Bronwyn C. Miller	Nonpartisan	2018	Incumbent retained in retention vote held November 3, 2026.	✓ Yes 60.1%; No 39.9%
3	Monica Gordo	Nonpartisan	2019	Incumbent retained in retention vote held November 3, 2026.	✓ Yes 62.3%; No 37.7%
3	Fleur J. Lobree	Nonpartisan	2019	Incumbent retained in retention vote held November 3, 2026.	✓ Yes 60.9%; No 39.1%
4	Shannon K. Shaw	Nonpartisan	2025	Incumbent retained in retention vote held November 3, 2026.	✓ Yes 57.2%; No 42.8%
4	Caroline Shepherd	Nonpartisan	2025	Incumbent retained in retention vote held November 3, 2026.	✓ Yes 58.0%; No 42.0%
4	Alan O. Forst	Nonpartisan	2013	Incumbent retained in retention vote held November 3, 2026.	✓ Yes 55.7%; No 44.3%
4	Mark W. Klingensmith	Nonpartisan	2013	Incumbent retained in retention vote held November 3, 2026.	✓ Yes 54.9%; No 45.1%
4	Jonathan D. Lott	Nonpartisan	2025	Incumbent retained in retention vote held November 3, 2026.	✓ Yes 55.8%; No 44.2%
5	F. Rand Wallis	Nonpartisan	2013	Incumbent retained in retention vote held November 3, 2026.	✓ Yes 62.8%; No 37.2%
5	John M. Harris	Nonpartisan	2018	Incumbent retained in retention vote held November 3, 2026.	✓ Yes 64.2%; No 35.8%
5	Scott Makar	Nonpartisan	2023	Incumbent retained in retention vote held November 3, 2026.	✓ Yes 63.3%; No 36.7%

=== Illinois ===
==== Appellate Court ====
District	Incumbent	Party	First elected	Status	Vote
1	Bertina E. Lampkin	Democratic	2009	Incumbent retained in retention vote held November 3, 2026.	✓ Yes 75.7%; No 24.3%
4	James Knecht	Republican	1986	Incumbent retained in retention vote held November 3, 2026.	✓ Yes 80.4%; No 19.6%
5	John B. Barberis Jr.	Republican	2016	Incumbent retained in retention vote held November 3, 2026.	✓ Yes 74.3%; No 25.7%

=== Indiana ===
==== Court of Appeals ====
Position	Incumbent	Party	First elected	Status	Vote
2	Dana J. Kenworthy	Nonpartisan	2023 (Note: Appointed by Governor Eric Holcomb)	Incumbent retained in retention vote held November 3, 2026.	✓ Yes 75.1%; No 24.9%
4	Mary A. DeBoer	Nonpartisan	2024	Incumbent retained in retention vote held November 3, 2026.	✓ Yes 73.6%; No 26.4%
5	Paul A. Felix	Nonpartisan	2023	Incumbent retained in retention vote held November 3, 2026.	✓ Yes 71.8%; No 28.2%

==== Tax Court ====
Position	Incumbent	Party	First elected	Status	Vote
At-large	Justin McAdam	Nonpartisan	2023	Incumbent retained in retention vote held November 3, 2026.	✓ Yes 72.9%; No 27.1%

=== Iowa ===
==== Court of Appeals ====
Position	Incumbent	Party	First elected	Status	Vote
At-large	John M. Sandy	Nonpartisan	2024 (Note: Appointed by Governor Kim Reynolds)	Incumbent retained in retention vote held November 3, 2026.	✓ Yes 70.9%; No 29.1%
At-large	Julie Schumacher	Nonpartisan	2019	Incumbent retained in retention vote held November 3, 2026.	✓ Yes 73.8%; No 26.2%
At-large	Sharon Soorholtz Greer	Nonpartisan	2019	Incumbent retained in retention vote held November 3, 2026.	✓ Yes 71.3%; No 28.7%

=== Kansas ===
==== Supreme Court ====
Position	Incumbent	Party	First elected	Status	Vote
Seat 4	Eric S. Rosen	Nonpartisan	2005 (Note: Appointed by Governor Kathleen Sebelius)	Incumbent retained in retention vote held November 3, 2026.	✓ Yes 65.2%; No 34.8%
Seat 6	Larkin Walsh	Nonpartisan	2025 (Note: Appointed by Governor Laura Kelly)	Incumbent retained in retention vote held November 3, 2026.	✓ Yes 64.9%; No 35.1%

==== Court of Appeals ====
Position	Incumbent	Party	First elected	Status	Vote
Position 2	Lesley A. Isherwood	Nonpartisan	2021	Incumbent retained in retention vote held November 3, 2026.	✓ Yes 71.4%; No 28.6%
Position 3	Amy F. Cline	Nonpartisan	2021	Incumbent retained in retention vote held November 3, 2026.	✓ Yes 72.2%; No 27.8%
Position 5	Kim R. Schroeder	Nonpartisan	2013 (Note: Appointed by Governor Sam Brownback)	Incumbent retained in retention vote held November 3, 2026.	✓ Yes 74.0%; No 26.0%
Position 7	Lori Bolton Fleming	Nonpartisan	2025	Incumbent retained in retention vote held November 3, 2026.	✓ Yes 73.2%; No 26.8%
Position 13	Jacy J. Hurst	Nonpartisan	2021	Incumbent retained in retention vote held November 3, 2026.	✓ Yes 70.8%; No 29.2%

=== Maryland ===
==== Supreme Court ====
Position	Incumbent	Party	First elected	Status	Vote
Circuit 4	Peter Killough	Nonpartisan	2024 (Note: Appointed by Governor Wes Moore)	Incumbent retained in retention vote held November 3, 2026.	✓ Yes 85.8%; No 14.2%

==== Appellate Court ====
Position	Incumbent	Party	First elected	Status	Vote
At-large	Daniel A. Friedman	Nonpartisan	2014 (Note: Appointed by Governor Martin O'Malley)	Incumbent retained in retention vote held November 3, 2026.	✓ Yes 86.3%; No 16.4%

=== Missouri ===
==== Supreme Court ====
Position	Incumbent	Party	First elected	Status	Vote
At-large	Paul C. Wilson	Nonpartisan	2012 (Note: Appointed by Governor Jay Nixon)	Incumbent retained in retention vote held November 3, 2026.	✓ Yes 62.8%; No 37.2%

==== Court of Appeals ====
Position	Incumbent	Party	First elected	Status	Vote
East	Virginia W. Lay	Nonpartisan	2024 (Note: Appointed by Governor Mike Parson)	Incumbent retained in retention vote held November 3, 2026.	✓ Yes 63.3%; No 36.7%
East	Angela Turner Quigless	Nonpartisan	2012	Incumbent retained in retention vote held November 3, 2026.	✓ Yes 66.4%; No 33.6%
East	Rebeca McKelvey	Nonpartisan	2024	Incumbent retained in retention vote held November 3, 2026.	✓ Yes 64.4%; No 35.6%
South	Matt Hamner	Nonpartisan	2024	Incumbent retained in retention vote held November 3, 2026.	✓ Yes 72.6%; No 27.4%
West	Lisa White Hardwick	Nonpartisan	2024 (Note: Appointed by Governor Bob Holden)	Incumbent retained in retention vote held November 3, 2026.	✓ Yes 67.6%; No 32.4%

=== Nebraska ===
==== Court of Appeals ====
Position	Incumbent	Party	First elected	Status	Vote
2	Michael W. Pirtle	Nonpartisan	2011 (Note: Appointed by Governor Dave Heineman)	Incumbent retained in retention vote held November 3, 2026.	✓ Yes 62.5%; No 37.5%

=== New Mexico ===
==== Supreme Court ====
Position	Incumbent	Party	First elected	Status	Vote
At-large	David K. Thomson	Democratic	2019 (Note: Appointed by Governor Michelle Lujan Grisham)	Incumbent retained in retention vote held November 3, 2026.	✓ Yes 68.6%; No 31.4%
At-large	C. Shannon Bacon	Democratic	2019	Incumbent retained in retention vote held November 3, 2026.	✓ Yes 68.4%; No 31.6%

==== Court of Appeals ====
Position	Incumbent	Party	First elected	Status	Vote
At-large	J. Miles Hanisee	Republican	2011 (Note: Appointed by Governor Susana Martinez)	Incumbent retained in retention vote held November 3, 2026.	✓ Yes 67.4%; No 32.6%

=== Northern Mariana Islands ===
==== Supreme Court ====
Position	Incumbent	Party	First elected	Status	Vote
At-large	Alexandro Castro	Nonpartisan	2012 (Note: Appointed by Governor Benigno Fitial)	Incumbent retained in retention vote held November 3, 2026.	✓ Yes 85.0%; No 15.0%

=== Oklahoma ===
==== Supreme Court ====
Position	Incumbent	Party	First elected	Status	Vote
District 1	M. John Kane IV	Nonpartisan	2019 (Note: Appointed by Governor Kevin Stitt)	Incumbent retained in retention vote held November 3, 2026.	✓ Yes 58.0%; No 42.0%
District 4 (special)	Travis Jett	Nonpartisan	2025	Incumbent retained in retention vote held November 3, 2026.	✓ Yes 57.5%; No 42.5%
District 6	Dana Kuehn	Nonpartisan	2021	Incumbent retained in retention vote held November 3, 2026.	✓ Yes 58.7%; No 41.3%
District 9	Richard Darby	Nonpartisan	2018 (Note: Appointed by Governor Mary Fallin)	Incumbent retained in retention vote held November 3, 2026.	✓ Yes 52.8%; No 47.2%

==== Court of Civil Appeals ====
Position	Incumbent	Party	First elected	Status	Vote
District 1, Office 1	Stacie Hixon	Nonpartisan	2020	Incumbent retained in retention vote held November 3, 2026.	✓ Yes 58.6%; No 41.4%
District 1, Office 2	Jane Wiseman	Nonpartisan	2005 (Note: Appointed by Governor Brad Henry)	Incumbent retained in retention vote held November 3, 2026.	✓ Yes 58.0%; No 42.0%
District 2, Office 1	Deborah Barnes	Nonpartisan	2008	Incumbent retained in retention vote held November 3, 2026.	✓ Yes 56.8%; No 43.2%
District 2, Office 2	Jim Huber	Nonpartisan	2023	Incumbent retained in retention vote held November 3, 2026.	✓ Yes 58.3%; No 41.7%

==== Court of Criminal Appeals ====
Position	Incumbent	Party	First elected	Status	Vote
District 2	Robert Hudson	Nonpartisan	2015	Incumbent retained in retention vote held November 3, 2026.	✓ Yes 57.7%; No 42.3%

=== Tennessee ===
==== Supreme Court ====
Position	Incumbent	Party	First elected	Status	Vote
At-large (special)	Mary L. Wagner	Nonpartisan	2024 (Note: Appointed by Governor Bill Lee)	Incumbent retained in retention vote held August 6, 2026.	✓ Yes 72.4%; No 27.6%
At-large (special)	Kyle Hixson	Nonpartisan	2026	Incumbent retained in retention vote held August 6, 2026.	✓ Yes 71.4%; No 28.6%

==== Court of Appeals ====
Position	Incumbent	Party	First elected	Status	Vote
East (special)	William E. Phillips II	Nonpartisan	2026	Incumbent retained in retention vote held August 6, 2026.	✓ Yes 72.4%; No 27.6%
West (special)	Steve Maroney	Nonpartisan	2026	Incumbent retained in retention vote held August 6, 2026.	✓ Yes 71.9%; No 28.1%
West (special)	Valerie Smith	Nonpartisan	2025	Incumbent retained in retention vote held August 6, 2026.	✓ Yes 74.6%; No 25.4%

==== Court of Criminal Appeals ====
Position	Incumbent	Party	First elected	Status	Vote
East (special)	Stacy L. Street	Nonpartisan	2026	Incumbent retained in retention vote held August 6, 2026.	✓ Yes 74.1%; No 25.9%
East (special)	Steven W. Sword	Nonpartisan	2025	Incumbent retained in retention vote held August 6, 2026.	✓ Yes 72.1%; No 27.9%

=== Utah ===
==== Supreme Court ====
Position	Incumbent	Party	First elected	Status	Vote
At-large	Jill Pohlman	Nonpartisan	2022 (Note: Appointed by Governor Spencer Cox)	Incumbent retained in retention vote held November 3, 2026.	✓ Yes 76.4%; No 23.6%

==== Court of Appeals ====
Position	Incumbent	Party	First elected	Status	Vote
At-large	Michele Christiansen	Nonpartisan	2010 (Note: Appointed by Governor Gary Herbert)	Incumbent retained in retention vote held November 3, 2026.	✓ Yes 79.5%; No 20.5%
At-large	Gregory K. Orme	Nonpartisan	1987 (Note: Appointed by Governor Norman H. Bangerter)	Incumbent retained in retention vote held November 3, 2026.	✓ Yes 78.0%; No 22.0%
At-large	David Mortensen	Nonpartisan	2016	Incumbent retained in retention vote held November 3, 2026.	✓ Yes 77.4%; No 22.6%
At-large	Ryan M. Harris	Nonpartisan	2017	Incumbent retained in retention vote held November 3, 2026.	✓ Yes 76.4%; No 23.6%
At-large	John Luthy	Nonpartisan	2022	Incumbent retained in retention vote held November 3, 2026.	✓ Yes 72.6%; No 27.4%
At-large	Amy Oliver	Nonpartisan	2023	Incumbent retained in retention vote held November 3, 2026.	✓ Yes 74.5%; No 25.5%

=== Wyoming ===
==== Supreme Court ====
Position	Incumbent	Party	First elected	Status	Vote
At-large	Robert Jarosh	Nonpartisan	2024 (Note: Appointed by Governor Mark Gordon)	Incumbent retained in retention vote held November 3, 2026.	✓ Yes 75.6%; No 24.4%
At-large (special)	Bridget Hill	Nonpartisan	2025	Incumbent retained in retention vote held November 3, 2026.	✓ Yes 76.0%; No 24.0%

== Kansas ballot measure ==
The state of Kansas held a referendum to determine whether or not to vote on justices of the Kansas Supreme Court starting in 2028. Justices are currently appointed by the governor of Kansas. The measure was rejected by voters.
