= List of state intermediate appellate courts =

42 of the 50 states have an intermediate appellate court, and eight (Delaware, Maine, Montana, New Hampshire, Rhode Island, South Dakota, Vermont, and Wyoming) do not.

Some of the states that do have intermediate appellate courts have more than one, such as Alabama, which has one intermediate appellate court for civil matters and another for criminal, and Pennsylvania, with a Superior Court and a Commonwealth Court which are both appellate courts but with different subject-matter jurisdictions.

Of the states with intermediate appellate courts, some have many divisions with varying degrees of independence from each other.

== State intermediate appellate courts ==
Court	Number of judges	Established
Alabama Court of Civil Appeals	5	1969
Alabama Court of Criminal Appeals	5	1969
Alaska Court of Appeals	4	1980
Arizona Court of Appeals	22	1965
Arkansas Court of Appeals	12	1978
California Courts of Appeal	105	1905
Colorado Court of Appeals	22	1891
Connecticut Appellate Court	10	1982
Florida District Courts of Appeal	71	1957
Georgia Court of Appeals	12	1906
Hawaii Intermediate Court of Appeals	6	1979
Idaho Court of Appeals	4	1982
Illinois Appellate Court	54	1877
Indiana Court of Appeals	15	1891
Iowa Court of Appeals	9	1976
Kansas Court of Appeals	12	1977
Kentucky Court of Appeals	14	1975
Louisiana Circuit Courts of Appeal	54	1879
Maryland Appellate Court	13	1966
Massachusetts Appeals Court	25	1972
Michigan Court of Appeals	28	1963
Minnesota Court of Appeals	19	1983
Mississippi Court of Appeals	9	1995
Missouri Court of Appeals	32	1972
Nebraska Court of Appeals	6	1991
Nevada Court of Appeals	3	2014
New Jersey Superior Court, Appellate Division	32	1947
New Mexico Court of Appeals	10	1965
New York Supreme Court, Appellate Division	60	1896
North Carolina Court of Appeals	15	1967
North Dakota Court of Appeals	3	1987
Ohio District Courts of Appeal	68	1912
Oklahoma Court of Civil Appeals	12	1970
Oregon Court of Appeals	13	1969
Pennsylvania Superior Court	15	1895
Pennsylvania Commonwealth Court	9	1968
Puerto Rico Court of Appeals	39	1992
South Carolina Court of Appeals	9	1983
Tennessee Court of Appeals	12	1925
Tennessee Court of Criminal Appeals	12	1925
Texas Court of Appeals	80	1891
Utah Court of Appeals	7	1987
Virginia Court of Appeals	17	1985
Washington Court of Appeals	22	1969
West Virginia Intermediate Court of Appeals	3	2021
Wisconsin Courts of Appeal	16	1978
