= 2026 West Virginia elections =

- November 3, 2026

A general election was held in the U.S. state of West Virginia on November 3, 2026, as part of the 2026 United States elections. The state primary was held on May 12, 2026, alongside judicial races.

== Federal offices ==
=== Senate ===
Incumbent two-term Republican Senator Shelley Moore Capito, who was re-elected in 2020, won re-election to a third term in office. She faced Democrat Rachel Fetty Anderson, a former Morgantown city councilmember. Senator Capito won with 58% of the vote, the lowest share of the vote she received in any of her statewide campaigns.

=== House of Representatives ===
In District 1, incumbent Republican Carol Miller won reelection to a fifth term. Miller faced Democrat Vince George, a retired public policy analyst, and won 57% of the vote.

In District 2, incumbent Republican Riley Moore won reelection to a second term. Moore faced Democrat Ace Parsi, a political organizer, and won 59% of the vote.

== State legislative offices ==
=== State Senate ===
19 of the 34 seats in the West Virginia State Senate held elections, including eighteen Republican-held seats and one Democratic-held seat. Two incumbents chose not to seek re-election: Republican Charles H. Clements and Democrat Mike Woelfel. Two seats up for election were special elections caused by the resignations of Republicans Eric Nelon and Michael B. Stuart. Before the election, Republicans held a supermajority in the chamber, holding thirty-two of the thirty-four seats, with Democrats holding two.

The election saw Republicans win sixteen of the nineteen seats up for election, while Democrats won three, flipping two Republican-held seats in Senate districts covering the Charleston and Morgantown areas. Republicans retained their supermajority in the State Senate, controlling thirty of the thirty-four seats.

=== House of Delegates ===
All 100 seats in the West Virginia House of Delegates are up for election. Before the election, Republicans held a supermajority in the chamber, holding ninety of the hundred seats, with Democrats holding nine, and one vacancy.

The election saw Republicans win approximately seventy-nine seats to twenty-one seats won by Democrats.

== Judicial ==
=== Supreme Court of Appeals ===
Two seats on the Supreme Court of Appeals of West Virginia were up for election, held during the May 12 statewide primary. Black Bear PAC, a PAC linked to Governor Patrick Morrisey, reportedly spent $125,000 supporting each the incumbents in both races. First Principles PAC, a PAC linked to conservative activist Leonard Leo, reportedly spent hundreds of thousands of dollars supporting incumbent Tom Ewing in Division 2. Ultimately, both incumbents were defeated.

==== Division 1 ====
A special election was held to fill the remainder of former Justice Tim Armstead's term, set to expire in 2032. Gerald Titus was appointed by Governor Patrick Morrisey in November 2025 following Justice Armstead's death. Titus was defeated by Raleigh Circuit Court Judge H. L. Kirkpatrick, who will serve until the regularly scheduled elections in 2032.

West Virginia Supreme Court of Appeals election, Division 1, 2026
Party	Candidate	Votes	%
Nonpartisan	H. L. Kirkpatrick	66,007	31.05%
Nonpartisan	Gerald Titus (incumbent)	56,034	26.36%
Nonpartisan	Laura Faircloth	44,435	20.90%
Nonpartisan	Todd Kirby	26,923	12.67%
Nonpartisan	Martin Sheehan	19,172	9.02%
Total votes		212,571	100.0%

==== Division 2 ====
A special election was held to fill the remainder of former Justice Beth Walker's term, set to expire in 2028. Tom Ewing was appointed by Governor Patrick Morrisey in August 2025 after Beth Walker announced her retirement. Ewing was defeated by House of Delegates member Bill Flanigan, who will serve until the regularly scheduled elections in 2028.

West Virginia Supreme Court of Appeals election, Division 2, 2026
Party	Candidate	Votes	%
Nonpartisan	Bill Flanigan	114,221	58.17%
Nonpartisan	Tom Ewing (incumbent)	82,134	41.83%
Total votes		196,355	100.0%

=== Intermediate Court of Appeals ===
One seat on the Intermediate Court of Appeals of West Virginia was up for election, held during the May 12 primary. Incumbent Daniel W. Greear, who was appointed by Governor Jim Justice upon the Court's creation in 2021, is running for reelection. First Principles PAC, a PAC linked to conservative activist Leonard Leo, reportedly spent $250,000 supporting Judge Greear. Jim Douglas, a Kanawha County Family Court Judge, defeated Greear in the election and will serve a ten-year term until 2036. Douglas became the first judge of the Court with a family law background, notable as a quarter of the Court's docket consists of family court matters.

County results: Douglas: 50–60%; 60–70%; 70–80%; Greear: 50–60%

West Virginia Intermediate Court of Appeals election, 2026
Party	Candidate	Votes	%
Nonpartisan	Jim Douglas	112,330	58.89%
Nonpartisan	Daniel W. Greear (incumbent)	78,419	41.11%
Total votes		190,749	100.0%

== Ballot measure ==
=== Amendment 1 ===
The West Virginia Citizenship Voting Requirement Amendment is a legislatively-referred ballot measure which proposed to amend the state Constitution to prohibit non-federal citizens from voting in state elections. Along with other minor changes, the proposed amendment will change the language of the state Constitution from "The citizens of the state shall be entitled to vote" to "Only citizens of the state who are citizens of the United States are entitled to vote." The ballot measure follows a trend of other states amending their constitutions to restrict voting to non-citizens. The measure was overwhelmingly approved by voters.

Amendment 1
Choice	Votes	%
For	341,290	79.55
Against	87,709	20.45
Total	428,999	100.00

== Maps ==
Maps of the 2026 West Virginia primary election

2026 primary participation by party's share of the cumulative U.S. Senate vote
Republican: 50–60% 60–70% 70–80% 80–90% 90–100%
Democratic: 50–60% 60–70%
