= 2026 North Dakota Supreme Court election =

- November 3, 2026
Candidate	Ariston Johnson	Jerod E. Tufte
Incumbent Justice
Jerod E. Tufte

A nonpartisan election to the North Dakota Supreme Court will be held on November 3, 2026 for the seat currently held by Justice Jerod E. Tufte to serve a ten-year term. A top-two primary will be held on June 9, 2026.

Justice Tufte, who was first elected in 2016, is running for re-election. He is opposed by attorney Ariston Johnson, along with any write-in candidate that may field a candidacy. This is the first Supreme Court election since 2018 in which an incumbent justice who is running for re-election will face an opponent.

== Primary election ==
=== Candidates ===
==== Advanced to General ====
- Ariston Johnson, attorney
- Jerod E. Tufte, incumbent justice (2017–present)

=== Results ===
Unofficial primary results by county: Tufte: 50–60%; 60–70%; 70–80%; 80–90%; Johnson: 50–60%; 70–80%

Primary election, June 9, 2026 Unofficial results
Party	Candidate	Votes	%
Nonpartisan	Jerod E. Tufte (incumbent)	63,253	63.44%
Nonpartisan	Ariston E. Johnson	36,045	36.15%
Write-in		402	0.40%
Total votes		99,700	100.00%

== General election ==
The top-two placing candidates in the primary election will advance to the general election. Tufte is likely to be a favorite among many Conservatives because, in 2020, Ballotpedia gave him a confidence score of, “Strong Republican.” Johnson has stated that he, “generally identif[ies] as apolitical,” and has stated, “I don’t bring my politics to work and I would not bring them to the Supreme Court.”

== Special election ==
2026 North Dakota Supreme Court special election
- November 3, 2026
Candidate	Douglas Bahr
Incumbent Justice
Douglas Bahr

A special election for the 8-year unexpired term caused by the resignation of Justice Gerald W. VandeWalle on January 31, 2023 is also on the ballot.

Interim appointee Justice Douglas Bahr is running for re-election. He is unopposed.

=== Primary election ===
==== Candidates ====
===== Advanced to General =====
- Douglas Bahr, incumbent justice (2023–present)

==== Results ====
Unofficial primary results by county: Bahr: 90–100%

Primary election, June 9, 2026
Party	Candidate	Votes	%
Nonpartisan	Douglas Bahr (incumbent)	97,321	99.5%
Write-in		508	0.5%

== See also ==
- List of justices of the North Dakota Supreme Court
