= 2026 Michigan Supreme Court election =

- November 3, 2026

2 of 7 seats on the Michigan Supreme Court
	Majority party	Minority party
Party	Democratic	Republican
Last election	5	2
Seats before	6	1
Seats after	6	1
Seat change	Steady	Steady

The 2026 Michigan Supreme Court election took place on November 3, 2026, to elect two of seven justices to the Michigan Supreme Court. While the election is officially nonpartisan, candidates are chosen by political parties through conventions.

== Background ==
Under the Michigan Constitution, political parties select their nominees for this election through conventions. In recent election cycles, parties have chosen to hold endorsement conventions earlier in the year under the belief that it would be helpful to give more time for statewide campaigns. At these conventions, candidates are only endorsed and nominations are not finalized until the formal nomination conventions later in the cycle.

Following the 2024 elections, Democrats flipped a seat on the court and increased their majority from 4–3 to 5–2. This majority was increased once more when then-Chief Justice Elizabeth T. Clement resigned in April 2025 and was replaced by Noah Hood.

== Democratic convention ==
=== Candidates ===
==== Nominees ====
- Megan Cavanagh, incumbent justice (2019–present (Note: chief justice from 2025–present))
- Noah Hood, incumbent justice (2025–present)

=== Endorsements ===
Megan Cavanagh

Executive branch officials

- Eric Holder, former attorney general (2009–2015)

Labor unions

- Michigan AFL-CIO

Organizations

- EMILYs List
- Michigan Association for Justice
- Vote Mama

Political parties

- Michigan Democratic Party
Noah Hood

Executive branch officials

- Eric Holder, former attorney general (2009–2015)

Labor unions

- Michigan AFL-CIO

Organizations

- Michigan Association for Justice

Political parties

- Michigan Democratic Party

== Republican convention ==
=== Candidates ===
==== Nominees ====
- Casandra Morse-Bills, Oscoda County District Court judge
- Michael Warren, Oakland County Circuit Court judge

=== Endorsements ===
Casandra Morse-Bills

Organizations

- Michigan Chamber of Commerce

Political parties

- Michigan Republican Party
Michael Warren

Political parties

- Michigan Republican Party

== U.S. Taxpayers Party convention ==
=== Candidates ===
==== Nominees ====
- Thomas W. Howe
- Jody White (previously ran for state senate)

== General election ==
=== Post-convention endorsements ===
Megan Cavanagh

Organizations

- Reproductive Freedom for All

Newspapers

- Michigan Chronicle
Noah Hood

Organizations

- Reproductive Freedom for All

Newspapers

- Michigan Chronicle

=== Forum ===
2026 Michigan Supreme Court election forum
No.	Date	Host	Moderator	Link	Candidates					
Key: P Participant A Absent N Not invited I Invited W Withdrawn										
Key: P Participant A Absent N Not invited I Invited W Withdrawn					Cavanagh	Hood	Howe	Morse-Bills	Warren	White
1	September 22, 2026	League of Women Voters of Michigan	Judy Florian	YouTube	P	P	P	P	P	P

=== Results ===
2026 Michigan Supreme Court election (vote for not more than 2)
Party	Candidate	Votes	%
Nonpartisan	Megan Cavanagh (incumbent)	2,242,824	34.16
Nonpartisan	Noah Hood (incumbent)	1,938,052	29.52
Nonpartisan	Michael Warren	900,530	13.72
Nonpartisan	Casandra Morse-Bills	829,005	12.63
Nonpartisan	Jody White	347,886	5.30
Nonpartisan	Thomas W. Howe	306,315	4.67
Total votes		6,564,619	100.0

== See also ==
- 2026 United States judicial elections
- 2026 Michigan elections
