= 2026 Alabama Supreme Court election =

- November 3, 2026

The 2026 Alabama Supreme Court election was held on November 3, 2026 to elect two members to the Alabama Supreme Court. Incumbent justices Brad Mendheim and Greg Shaw are running for re-election.

== Place 7 ==
=== Republican primary ===
==== Candidates ====
===== Nominee =====
- Brad Mendheim, incumbent Supreme Court justice (2018–2019, 2019–present)

==== Endorsements ====
Brad Mendheim

Organizations

- Alabama Farmers Federation
- Alabama Forestry Association
- Alabama Realtors PAC
- Business Council of Alabama
- Manufacture Alabama
- Electric Cooperatives of Alabama

==== Fundraising ====
Campaign finance reports as of May 18, 2026
Candidate	Raised	Other receipts	Spent	Cash on hand
Brad Mendheim (R)	$49,824	$0	$9,828	$39,995
Source: Alabama FCPA

=== General election ===
==== Results ====
2026 Alabama Supreme Court election, place 7
Party	Candidate	Votes	%
Republican	Brad Mendheim (incumbent)	998,547	95.94%
Write-in		42,209	4.06%
Total votes		1,040,756	100.00

== Place 8 ==
2026 Alabama Supreme Court place eight election
- November 3, 2026
Nominee	Greg Shaw	AshLeigh Dunham
Party	Republican	Democratic
Popular vote	909,547	753,978
Percentage	54.6%	45.3%
- Shaw: 50–60% 60–70% 70–80% 80–90% Dunham: 50–60% 60–70% 70–80% 80–90%
Justice before election
Greg Shaw
Republican
Elected Justice
TBD

=== Republican primary ===
==== Candidates ====
===== Nominee =====
- Greg Shaw, incumbent Supreme Court justice (2009–present)

==== Endorsements ====
Greg Shaw

Organizations

- Alabama Farmers Federation
- Alabama Forestry Association
- Alabama Realtors PAC
- Business Council of Alabama
- Electric Cooperatives of Alabama
- Manufacture Alabama

==== Fundraising ====
Campaign finance reports as of May 18, 2026
Candidate	Raised	Other receipts	Spent	Cash on hand
Greg Shaw (R)	$25,500	$3,500	$3,850	$25,150
Source: Alabama FCPA

=== Democratic primary ===
==== Candidates ====
===== Nominee =====
- AshLeigh Dunham, court referee for Jefferson County's Juvenile Court

==== Endorsements ====
AshLeigh Dunham

State legislators

- Laura Hall, state representative from the 19th district
- Marilyn Lands, state representative from the 10th district

Organizations

- Southern Poverty Law Center Action Fund

==== Fundraising ====
Campaign finance reports as of May 18, 2026
Candidate	Raised	Other receipts	Spent	Cash on hand
AshLeigh Dunham (D)	$61,635	$39,000	$86,822	$13,812
Source: Alabama FCPA

=== General election ===
==== Post-primary endorsements ====
AshLeigh Dunham (D)

Organizations

- Alabama AFL-CIO

==== Fundraising ====
Campaign finance reports as of November 2, 2026
Candidate	Raised	Other receipts	Spent	Cash on hand
Greg Shaw (R)	$258,200	$3,650	$244,324	$17,525
AshLeigh Dunham (D)	$108,585	$39,000	$129,110	$18,475
Source: Alabama FCPA

==== Results ====
2026 Alabama Supreme Court election, place 8
Party	Candidate	Votes	%
Republican	Greg Shaw (incumbent)	909,547	54.64
Democratic	AshLeigh Dunham	753,978	45.29
Write-in		1,232	0.07
Total votes		1,664,757	100.00
