= 1973 Wisconsin Supreme Court election =

- April 3, 1973

Candidate	Bruce F. Beilfuss	Robert J. Beaudry
Popular vote	634,831	303,721
Percentage	67.64%	32.36%
Justice before election
Bruce F. Beilfuss
Elected Justice
Bruce F. Beilfuss

The 1973 Wisconsin Supreme Court election was held on Tuesday, April 3, 1973 to elect a justice to a full ten-year seat the Wisconsin Supreme Court. Incumbent justice Bruce F. Beilfuss won re-election to a second term.

== Candidates ==
- Robert J. Beaudry, Milwaukee County-based appellate and trial attorney; counsel to the Showmen's League of America; former chair of the Milwaukee County Democratic Party (1962); perennial candidate (Note: unsuccessful 1950 candidate for West Allis city attorney; unsuccessful 1952 candidate for Milwaukee County district attorney; unsuccessful candidate for Milwaukee County supervisor; unsuccessful candidate for Milwaukee County municipal judge; unsuccessful 1963 candidate for chair of the Wisconsin Democratic Party); campaign manager of Michael T. Sullivan's successful 1953 Circuit Court campaign
- Bruce F. Beilfuss, incumbent justice

== Campaign ==
It has been very rare in Wisconsin for an incumbent Supreme Court justice to be unseated for re-election. However, there was recent memory of such an occurrence in 1967. At the time Beilfuss, regarded to be the court's swing vote, was one of only two members of the court who had first joined the court by election (as opposed to gubernatorial appointment).

Beaudry had been censured by the Supreme Court in December 1971 over his conduct in relation to the drafting of a (successfully-challenged) will which had named him as the primary beneficiary of one of his clients. Beilfuss was one of several justices who had voted to censure him.

Beaudry used his campaign as an opportunity to advocate for probate reform, no-fault auto insurance, and increased state supervision of the courts. To the latter aspect, he argued that the Wisconsin Bar Association (the professional association of attorneys) should have less influence upon the Wisconsin State Board of Bar Commissioners (the state board to review grievances against attorneys).

Beilfuss voiced his support for legislative reform to simplify probate laws, and argued that the state courts themselves could sufficiently act to reform probate laws (as they were only equipped to remedy the systemic issues in a piece-meal fashion). Beilfuss was endorsed for re-election by State Senator David Berger, a Democrat who was the author of proposed probate reform legislation.

Beilfuss took a position in support of intermediate appellate court system being created in Wisconsin, but opposed the recommendation by a state task force that such a court should have appointed (not elected) judges.

== Results ==
After winning re-election, Beilfuss characterized his victory as coming from voters' appreciation of his judicial experience. Beilfuss complimented his opponent's political passion, but also opined that it had disadvantaged Beaudry's pursuit of a judicial seat. Beilfuss opined, "in a judicial office, your function requires a different campaign approach [than other offices]."

1973 Wisconsin Supreme Court election
Party	Candidate	Votes	%	±%
General election (April 3, 1973)
Nonpartisan	Bruce F. Beilfuss (incumbent)	634,831	67.64	+2.89pp
Nonpartisan	Robert J. Beaudry	303,721	32.36	
Plurality		331,110	35.28	
Total votes		938,552	100	
