= Judge Lawrence =

Judge Lawrence may refer to:

- Alexander Atkinson Lawrence Jr. (1906–1979), judge of the United States District Court for the Southern District of Georgia
- Anthony Lawrence (judge) (born 1965), judge of the Mississippi Court of Appeals
- Charles Drummond Lawrence (1878–1975), judge of the United States Customs Court
- Geoffrey Lawrence, 1st Baron Oaksey (1880–1971), British judge in the Nuremberberg trials
- Philip Kissick Lawrence (c. 1793–1841), judge of the United States District Courts for the Eastern and Western Districts of Louisiana
- William T. Lawrence (judge) (born 1947), judge of the United States District Court for the Southern District of Indiana

== See also ==
- Justice Lawrence (disambiguation)
