= 2026 Alabama appellate court elections =

- November 3, 2026

Elections were held in the U.S. state of Alabama to elect judges to both of the state appellate courts on November 3, 2026.

== Civil Appeals place 4 ==
=== Republican primary ===
==== Candidates ====
===== Nominee =====
- Ben Bowden, incumbent justice

==== Endorsements ====
Ben Bowden

Organizations

- Alabama Farmers Federation
- Alabama Forestry Association
- Alabama Realtors PAC
- Business Council of Alabama
- Electric Cooperatives of Alabama
- Manufacture Alabama

==== Fundraising ====
Campaign finance reports as of May 18, 2026
Candidate	Raised	Other receipts	Spent	Cash on hand
Ben Bowden (R)	$20,292	$4,945	$11,407	$13,830
Source: Alabama FCPA

=== General election ===
==== Results ====
2026 Alabama Court of Civil Appeals election, place 4
Party	Candidate	Votes	%
Republican	Ben Bowden (incumbent)	78,807	96.12
Write-in		3,184	3.88
Total votes		81,991	100.00

== Civil Appeals place 5 ==
=== Republican primary ===
==== Candidates ====
===== Nominee =====
- Matt Fridy, incumbent justice

==== Endorsements ====
Matt Fridy

Organizations

- Alabama Farmers Federation
- Alabama Forestry Association
- Alabama Realtors PAC
- Business Council of Alabama
- Electric Cooperatives of Alabama
- Manufacture Alabama

==== Fundraising ====
Campaign finance reports as of May 18, 2026
Candidate	Raised	Other receipts	Spent	Cash on hand
Matt Fridy (R)	$135,951	$0	$27,136	$64,234
Source: Alabama FCPA

=== General election ===
==== Results ====
2026 Alabama Court of Civil Appeals election, place 5
Party	Candidate	Votes	%
Republican	Matt Fridy (incumbent)	78,881	96.23
Write-in		3,087	3.77
Total votes		81,968	100.00

== Criminal Appeals place 4 ==
=== Republican primary ===
==== Candidates ====
===== Nominee =====
- Mary Windom, incumbent justice

==== Endorsements ====
Mary Windom

Organizations

- Alabama Farmers Federation
- Alabama Forestry Association
- Alabama Realtors PAC
- Business Council of Alabama
- Electric Cooperatives of Alabama
- Manufacture Alabama

==== Fundraising ====
Campaign finance reports as of May 18, 2026
Candidate	Raised	Other receipts	Spent	Cash on hand
Mary Windom (R)	$5,000	$254,793	$229,893	$29,900
Source: Alabama FCPA

=== General election ===
==== Results ====
2026 Alabama Court of Criminal Appeals election, place 4
Party	Candidate	Votes	%
Republican	Mary Windom (incumbent)	78,755	96.28
Write-in		3,041	3.72
Total votes		81,796	100.00

== Criminal Appeals place 5 ==
=== Republican primary ===
==== Candidates ====
===== Nominee =====
- Riggs Walker, former Jefferson County deputy district attorney and candidate for place 4 in 2018

===== Withdrawn =====
- Beth Kellum, incumbent justice

==== Endorsements ====
Beth Kellum (withdrawn)

Organizations

- Alabama Farmers Federation
- Alabama Forestry Association
- Business Council of Alabama
- Electric Cooperatives of Alabama
- Manufacture Alabama
Riggs Walker

Organizations

- Alabama Realtors PAC

==== Fundraising ====
Campaign finance reports as of May 18, 2026
Candidate	Raised	Other receipts	Spent	Cash on hand
Riggs Walker (R)	$14,925	$5,455	$5,502	$14,877
Source: Alabama FCPA

=== General election ===
==== Results ====
2026 Alabama Court of Criminal Appeals election, place 5
Party	Candidate	Votes	%
Republican	Riggs Walker	78,551	96.30
Write-in		3,016	3.70
Total votes		81,567	100.00
