= Bruce F. Beilfuss =

American lawyer and judge (1915–1986)

The Honorable Bruce F. Beilfuss
- portrait photograph, as justice in 1960s

22nd Chief Justice of the Wisconsin Supreme Court
- In office May 24, 1976 – July 31, 1983
- Preceded by: Horace W. Wilkie
- Succeeded by: Nathan Heffernan

Justice of the Wisconsin Supreme Court
- In office January 1, 1964 – July 31, 1983
- Preceded by: Timothy Brown
- Succeeded by: William A. Bablitch

Wisconsin Circuit Court Judge for the 17th Circuit
- In office April 15, 1948 – January 1, 1964
- Appointed by: Oscar Rennebohm
- Preceded by: Emery Crosby
- Succeeded by: Lowell D. Schoengarth

District Attorney of Clark County, Wisconsin
- In office January 2, 1941 – April 15, 1948
- Preceded by: Hugh F. Gwin
- Succeeded by: Clarence Gorsegner

Member of the Clark County Board of Supervisors
- In office 1939–1940

Personal details
- Born: January 8, 1915 Withee, Wisconsin, U.S.
- Died: August 18, 1986 (aged 71) Middleton, Wisconsin, U.S.
- Cause of death: Cancer
- Resting place: Middleton Junction Cemetery, Middleton, Wisconsin
- Party: Progressive
- Spouses: Helen B. Hendrickson (m. 1941; died 1960); De Ette H. Knowlton (m. 1961; died 2016)
- Children: Mark Beilfuss^{(b. 1950)}; Karen Johnson^{(b. 1940, died 2015)}
- Education: University of Wisconsin (B.S., LL.B.)
- Profession: Lawyer

Military service
- Allegiance: United States
- Branch/service: United States Navy
- Years of service: 1943–1946
- Rank: Lieutenant J.G.
- Battles/wars: World War II: Pacific War

Bruce Frederich Beilfuss (January 8, 1915 – August 18, 1986) was an American lawyer and jurist from Clark County, Wisconsin. He was the 22nd chief justice of the Wisconsin Supreme Court, from 1976 to 1983, and served a total of 20 years on the high court. He previously served 16 years as a Wisconsin circuit court judge, and 7 years as district attorney.

== Early life and career ==
Bruce Beilfuss was born in Withee, Wisconsin, in January 1915. He spent his childhood in that area until moving to the nearby city of Neillsville, Wisconsin, with his parents and siblings in 1927; he graduated from Neillsville High School in 1932. He immediately went on to the University of Wisconsin, where he earned his bachelor's degree in economics in 1936, and his LL.B. in 1938. He was admitted to the bar in July 1938, and began practicing law at Abbotsford, Wisconsin, as a member of the law firm of the former district attorney, Hugh G. Haight. He was helped along in his legal career by his uncle, Oscar W. Schoengarth, who was county judge of Clark County for 50 years.

As a young man, Beilfuss was involved in local highway safety efforts after the death of his brother, Wayne, in a 1935 car accident. He was elected chairman of the Clark County Safety Council in January 1939.

He entered politics by serving on the Clark County Board of Supervisors in 1939 and 1940. He won his April 1940 re-election over a challenge from Village President Charles Hoffman for his seat on the county board (defeating Hoffman 132 to 119). Later that year, Beilfuss entered the race for district attorney, challenging the incumbent, Hugh F. Gwin, in the Wisconsin Progressive Party primary election. He narrowly defeated Gwin, taking 54% of the primary vote, and went on to win the general election in November. After winning the election, Beilfuss largely relocated to Neillsville, the county seat, but still kept up his Abbotsford office, saying that his partner, the former district attorney Hugh Haight, would attend to the district attorney's business in Neillsville on the days when Beilfuss was out of town.

One of his early accomplishments as district attorney was rounding up a gang that had committed several robberies in the area. Beilfuss hired Milwaukee detective Otis Gomillion to come to Clark County to solve the string of crimes. Six members of the gang were eventually arrested, confessing to 11 robberies, with stolen property valued at about $4000 (about $86,000 adjusted for inflation to 2024). The next year, Beilfuss brought charges of forgery and embezzlement against the Clark County coronoer, P. C. Ludovic, who pleaded guilty in April 1942.

After the outbreak of World War II, Beilfuss enrolled in the United States Navy Reserve, and he was called up for active duty in August 1943. He was allowed to take a leave of absence from the district attorney's office without having to resign. The court appointed Richard Gaffney to serve as acting district attorney during his absence. He was initially sent to Naval Station Great Lakes for induction and was commissioned an ensign; he was then ordered to Norfolk, Virginia, in January 1944, for further training. He was later sent to Fort Pierce, Florida, where he served on the Florida Atlantic coast. Later that year he was transferred to California, where he was assigned to a flotilla for anti-submarine warfare. Despite his absence, he was re-elected without opposition as district attorney in 1944.

Beilfuss was subsequently deployed to the Philippine-Japan region and served through nearly all of 1945 as a PT boat captain, screening for Pacific Fleet aircraft carriers. He finally returned to the United States in January 1946, and was discharged shortly thereafter. He officially resumed his duties as district attorney on February 1, 1946. He was re-elected for a fourth term as district attorney that fall, facing no opposition.

== Judicial career ==
portrait photograph, circa 1973

In 1947, Wisconsin circuit court judge Emery Crosby died in office.. Beilfuss declared his candidacy for the office, which was up for election in Spring 1948. He defeated Alfred L. Devos in the April election, winning 57% of the vote. A week after the election, Governor Oscar Rennebohm appointed Beilfuss to begin his term in office early, as the seat was already vacant. He was re-elected in 1951 and 1957.

While a circuit judge, Beilfuss presided over a number of murder cases which gained statewide attention, including the case of Jane Dakin, a 17 year old girl who murdered both her parents with a rifle. After she was found not guilty by reason of insanity, Beilfuss ordered her committed to a state mental institution. Beilfuss also served in many other courtrooms around the state as a replacement judge on such cases, when another judge was indisposed or recused.

His most famous case, however, was likely the Jantz murder trial. The three defendants had murdered traffic officer James G. Jantz in a shootout after Jantz and another officer had been surveilling them. The three men had been identified as suspicious persons and were later found to have engaged in a series of robberies. As the murder occurred in Sauk County, Beilfuss was the circuit judge with jurisdiction over the case, but Beilfuss granted a change of venue to Dane County because of the inflamed passions in the community. After a seven-week trial, all three men were found guilty. Beilfuss sentenced them all to life imprisonment.

A few months after the Jantz case, Beilfuss announced his candidacy for Wisconsin Supreme Court, seeking the seat being vacated by the expected retirement of chief justice Timothy Brown. Four other candidates ultimately entered the race, but Beilfuss was the only one to field a serious campaign. Beilfuss easily prevailed in the March 1963 primary, receiving 53% of the vote. He prevailed with 64% of the 1963 general election over Douglas County attorney Harry E. Larsen.

Beilfuss faced a contested re-election race in 1973, but easily defeated Robert J. Beaudry with 67% of the vote. Beaudry had used the election as a platform to advocate for probate reform, no-fault auto insurance, and greater state supervision of the courts.

portrait photograph, as justice

In the 1970s, Beilfuss was regarded to be the court's swing vote. He became chief justice by seniority in May 1976, after the sudden death of chief justice Horace W. Wilkie. He served seven years of chief justice, announcing in 1982 that he would not run for a third term in 1983.

As chief justice, Beilfuss campaigned across the state for passage of the major constitutional amendments of 1977 which overhauled the state court system and established the Wisconsin Court of Appeals.

== Personal life and family ==
Bruce Beilfuss was one of three children born to Walter William Beilfuss and his wife Claudia (née Dodte). All of Beilfuss' grandparents were German immigrants. Bruce had a twin sister, Bonnie. Their elder brother, Wayne, died in a car accident while home from college in 1935. Bonnie Bielfuss also volunteered for service in World War II and served as a medical dietician in the Army and achieved the rank of first lieutenant.

Beilfuss' mother's sister was married to Oscar W. Schoengarth, who was county judge of Clark County, Wisconsin, for 50 years. Beilfuss' cousin, Lowell Schoengarth, was a close friend who also became a lawyer and succeeded Beilfuss as district attorney.

Bruce Beilfuss married Helen Beatrice Hendrickson, of Black River Falls, on May 29, 1941. They met while Beilfuss was studying at the University of Wisconsin and Hendrickson was studying nursing at the Wisconsin General Hospital. During the war, she had served as a nurse at the various stations where Beilfuss was assigned. They had one child together, Mark. She committed suicide, shooting herself in the head with a pistol on April 30, 1960. It was later reported that she had been under psychiatric care for more than a year.

Seventeen months after his first wife's death, on October 17, 1961, Beilfuss married De Ette Helen Knowlton, of Ellsworth. De Ette was a music teacher in St. Paul, Minnesota, at the time.

Beilfuss was active in the community outside the judiciary. He served as chair on the Board of Visitors of the University of Wisconsin Law School, was a member of the Veterans of Foreign Wars, the American Legion and a founder of the Dane County Big Brothers program.

Beilfuss died of cancer on August 18, 1986, at his home in Middleton, Wisconsin. He was survived by his wife, two children, and three grandchildren.

== Electoral history ==
=== Wisconsin circuit court (1948) ===
Wisconsin Circuit Court, 17th Circuit Election, 1948
Party	Candidate	Votes	%	±%
General Election, April 6, 1948
Nonpartisan	Bruce F. Beilfuss	8,797	56.81%	
Nonpartisan	Alfred L. Devos	6,688	43.19%	
Plurality		2,109	13.62%	
Total votes		15,485	100.0%	

=== Wisconsin Supreme Court (1963, 1973) ===
1963 Wisconsin Supreme Court election
Party	Candidate	Votes	%	±%
Nonpartisan Primary, March 5, 1963
Nonpartisan	Bruce F. Beilfuss	126,765	53.36%	
Nonpartisan	Harry E. Larsen	38,374	16.15%	
Nonpartisan	William H. Evans	31,071	13.08%	
Nonpartisan	Davis Donnelly	25,241	10.63%	
Nonpartisan	Christ Alexopoulos	16,095	6.78%	
Total votes		237,546	100.0%	
General Election, April 2, 1963
Nonpartisan	Bruce F. Beilfuss	411,428	64.75%	
Nonpartisan	Harry E. Larsen	224,022	35.25%	
Plurality		187,406	29.49%	
Total votes		635,450	100.0%	

1973 Wisconsin Supreme Court election
Party	Candidate	Votes	%	±%
General Election, April 3, 1973
Nonpartisan	Bruce F. Beilfuss (incumbent)	634,831	67.64%	+2.89pp
Nonpartisan	Robert J. Beaudry	303,721	32.36%	
Plurality		331,110	35.28%	
Total votes		938,552	100.0%	

Legal offices
Preceded by Hugh F. Gwin	District Attorney of Clark County, Wisconsin; 1941 – 1948	Succeeded by Clarence Gorsegner
Preceded by Emery Crosby	Wisconsin Circuit Court Judge for the 17th Circuit; 1948 – 1964	Succeeded by Lowell D. Schoengarth
Preceded by Timothy Brown	Justice of the Wisconsin Supreme Court; 1964 – 1983	Succeeded by William A. Bablitch
Preceded by Horace W. Wilkie	Chief Justice of the Wisconsin Supreme Court; 1976 – 1983	Succeeded by Nathan Heffernan
