= Jack Wilson (judge) =

American judge

Judge of the Mississippi Court of Appeals
- Incumbent
- Assumed office July 1, 2015
- Appointed by: Phil Bryant
- Preceded by: Larry Roberts

Personal details
- Born: Jack L. Wilson; 1978 or 1979 (age 45–46)
- Spouse: Amanda Nail
- Children: 4
- Education: University of Mississippi (BAcc); Harvard Law School (JD)

Jack L. Wilson is a Judge of the Mississippi Court of Appeals.

== Biography and career ==
Wilson graduated from the University of Mississippi with a Bachelor of Accountancy degree and then earned his Juris Doctor from Harvard Law School in 2004.

After law school, he served as a law clerk to Judge Gerald Bard Tjoflat of the United States Court of Appeals for the Eleventh Circuit and worked at Mayer Brown in Washington, D.C. From 2009 to 2012, Wilson worked at Bradley Arant Boult Cummings. He also was an adjunct at the Mississippi College School of Law.

Wilson served as deputy general counsel to Governor of Mississippi Phil Bryant from 2012 to 2013, and then was co-chief counsel from 2013 to 2014. He then returned to Bradley Arant Boult Cummings as a counsel in the Jackson office, where he continued to work until receiving his judicial appointment.

In the past, Wilson served as president of the Mississippi Lawyers chapter of the Federalist Society and currently serves as a Commissioner of the Uniform Law Commission.

== Judicial tenure ==
Wilson was appointed by Governor Bryant, effective July 1, 2015, to the Mississippi Court of Appeals Position 1 seat that covered District 3. The seat was vacated by Larry Roberts, who retired earlier in the year and left a partial term expiring on January 1, 2017. Wilson ran for election in 2016. He won a nonpartisan election to a term that expires on January 5, 2025.

== Electoral history ==
2016

Mississippi Court of Appeals 3rd District – Position 1 Results, November 8, 2016
Party	Candidate	Votes	%
Nonpartisan	Jack Wilson (incumbent)	109,864	49.83%
Nonpartisan	Ed Hannan	81,751	37.08%
Nonpartisan	Dow Yoder	28,864	13.09%
Plurality		28,113	12.75%
Total votes		220,479	100.00%
Runoff election

Mississippi Court of Appeals 3rd District – Position 1 Runoff Results, November 29, 2016
Party	Candidate	Votes	%
Nonpartisan	Jack Wilson (incumbent)	15,142	57.55%
Nonpartisan	Ed Hannan	11,169	42.45%
Majority		3,973	15.10%
Total votes		26,311	100.00%

Legal offices
Preceded by Larry Roberts	Judge of the Mississippi Court of Appeals; 2015–present	Incumbent
