= 2026 West Virginia Supreme Court of Appeals election =

- May 12, 2026

Two 2026 West Virginia Supreme Court of Appeals elections were held on May 12, 2026, to elect two justices to the Supreme Court of Appeals of West Virginia.

== Division 1 ==
=== Candidates ===
==== Declared ====
- Laura Faircloth, judge of the 27th judicial circuit
- Todd Kirby, judge of the circuit court in Raleigh County
- H. L. Kirkpatrick, former judge of the circuit court in Raleigh County (1996–2024)
- Martin Sheehan
- Gerald Titus, incumbent justice

=== Results ===
County results: Kirkpatrick: Kirkpatrick—20–30%; Kirkpatrick—30–40%; Kirkpatrick—40–50%; Kirkpatrick—50–60%; Kirkpatrick—60–70; Titus: Titus—20–30%; Titus—30–40%; Titus—40–50%; Titus—50–60%; Titus—70–80%; Faircloth: Faircloth—30–40%; Faircloth—40–50%; Faircloth—50–60%; Sheehan: Sheehan—30–40%; Sheehan—40–50%; Sheehan—50–60%

2026 West Virginia Supreme Court of Appeals election, division 1
Candidate	Votes	%
H. L. Kirkpatrick	66,296	31.04
Gerald Titus (incumbent)	56,273	26.35
Laura Faircloth	44,674	20.92
Todd Kirby	27,040	12.66
Martin Sheehan	19,296	9.03
Total votes	213,579	100.00

== Division 2 ==
County results: Flanigan: Flanigan—50–60%; Flanigan—60–70%; Flanigan—70–80%; Flanigan—80–90%; Flanigan—>90%; Ewing: Ewing—50–60%; Ewing—60–70%; Ewing—80–90%

=== Candidates ===
==== Declared ====
- Tom Ewing, incumbent justice
- Bill Flanigan, Republican state representative from the 4th district (2024–present) and the 51st district (2016)

=== Results ===
2026 West Virginia Supreme Court of Appeals election, division 2
Candidate	Votes	%
Bill Flanigan	114,826	58.20
Tom Ewing (incumbent)	82,477	41.80
Total votes	197,303	100.00
