= Justice Lawrence =

Justice Lawrence may refer to:

- Charles B. Lawrence (judge) (1820–1883), chief justice of the Illinois Supreme Court
- Edwin Lawrence (Michigan jurist) (1808–1885), associate justice of the Michigan Supreme Court

== See also ==
- Judge Lawrence (disambiguation)
