= Harold See =

American judge (born 1943)

Harold Frend See, Jr. (born November 7, 1943) is a legal scholar and was an associate justice of the Alabama Supreme Court from 1997 to 2009.

The son of Harold F. See, Sr., and Corinne See, he was born at the Great Lakes Naval Training Center in Illinois while his father was serving with the United States Navy in the South Pacific. See received a B.A. from Emporia State University, Kansas, an M.Sc. in economics from Iowa State University, and a J.D. from the University of Iowa College of Law, where he graduated with honors and was awarded the Order of the Coif.

See worked his way through school as a heavy equipment operator, a sheet metal worker, and a roofer. He served as assistant professor of economics at Illinois State University and practiced law with the law firm of Sidley & Austin. He joined the faculty at the University of Alabama School of Law, where he served for over twenty years successively as associate professor, full professor, and Herbert D. Warner Professor of Law.

In 1996, he was elected associate justice of the Alabama Supreme Court as a Republican by defeating first-term incumbent Democrat Kenneth Ingram in a race that attracted national attention for its rough campaign. See was sworn in following his November election in January, 1997. He lost a Republican Primary race to become chief justice in 2000 to then-Etowah County Circuit Judge Roy Moore, but was re-elected to a second term on the Supreme Court in 2002. He declined to run for reelection to a third term in 2008 and was succeeded by Greg Shaw.

See is currently a professor at Belmont University College of Law, where he teaches intellectual property, trademarks, and law and economics.

== Affiliations ==
See has served as a contributing editor to the Federal Circuit Bar Journal, and he is a member of the American Law Institute, the Alabama Law Institute, the American Law and Economics Association, the Federalist Society, the American Bar Association, the Alabama State Bar Association, and V.O.C.A.L., a victims' rights advocacy group. In 2011, Justice See joined the faculty of the Belmont University College of Law in Nashville, Tennessee.
