= Natalie Cochran =

American convicted murderer

Natalie Paige Cochran
- Born: Natalie Paige Cochran
- Occupation: Former pharmacist
- Spouse: Michael Brandon Cochran (deceased)
- Status: Incarcerated
- Motive: Financial gain, concealment of fraudulent activities
- Convictions: Wire fraud, Money laundering (federal), First-degree murder (state)
- Criminal charges: 2020 (fraud), 2025 (murder)
- Penalty: 135 months (fraud, federal), Life in prison without parole (murder, state)

Details
- Killed: 1
- Imprisoned at: FCI Hazelton

Natalie Paige Cochran (born November 1980) is an American former pharmacist and murderer. She is from Raleigh County, West Virginia. She is known for her convictions related to fraud and the murder of her husband, Michael Brandon Cochran.

== Early life and career ==
Natalie Paige Cochran (née Jessup; born November 1980) was born in Raleigh County, West Virginia. She pursued a career in pharmacy and married Michael Brandon Cochran in the early 2000s. The couple had two children and ran a contracting business during the 2010s, which later became central to her legal troubles.

== Criminal case history ==
=== Fraud convictions ===
From 2017 to 2019, Cochran operated a $2.5 million Ponzi scheme, defrauding investors under the guise of a government contracting business. She persuaded at least 11 individuals to invest in her companies, Technology Management Solutions and Tactical Solutions Group, by falsely claiming she had lucrative government contracts. Instead of investing the funds, Cochran used the money for personal expenses, including purchasing real estate, jewelry, and a 1965 Shelby Cobra. She also used funds from new investors to pay partial returns to earlier investors, a hallmark of Ponzi schemes. One investor alone lost over $500,000 due to her fraudulent activities. Cochran pleaded guilty to wire fraud and money laundering on September 21, 2020, and was sentenced to 135 months in federal prison. She was also ordered to pay $2.5 million in restitution and forfeit assets obtained through her scheme.

=== Murder conviction ===
Cochran was later convicted of first-degree murder in state court for poisoning her husband, Michael Brandon Cochran, with insulin. Prosecutors argued that Michael had grown suspicious of their business dealings and planned to investigate further. On February 5, 2019, Cochran canceled Michael’s flight to Virginia, where he intended to investigate their business dealings, and injected him with insulin. Despite his deteriorating condition, Cochran refused to take him to the hospital, telling friends he would “sleep it off.” Michael died on February 11, 2019.

During the trial, forensic experts confirmed that Michael’s death was caused by nonprescribed insulin. Prosecutors argued that Cochran killed her husband to prevent him from uncovering her fraudulent activities. The jury deliberated for less than two hours before delivering a guilty verdict. In January 2025, Cochran was sentenced to life imprisonment without parole, with the jury recommending no mercy.

After announcing in November 2023 that he would not run for re-election at the end of 2024, Judge H.L. Kirkpatrick, stated that he would preside over the Natalie Cochran trial by special appointment.

== Legislative impact ==
In February 2025, West Virginia lawmakers introduced House Bill 2789, also known as The Michael Brandon Cochran Act. The bill mandates intensive care units to conduct C-peptide insulin tests for unconscious patients or those presenting with hypoglycemia and blood glucose levels below 49 mg/dl. The legislation aims to prevent similar cases of insulin misuse.

== Media attention ==
Cochran’s story has been covered extensively in media outlets, including a feature on 20/20: Small Town Big Con, which explored her crimes and their impact on the community. Other national outlet coverage also includes CBS News, ABC News, Dateline NBC, Court TV, and People magazine. In July 2026 an episode of Snapped was aired on the Oxygen Network.
