= 2026 Tennessee Supreme Court election =

- August 6, 2026

The 2026 Tennessee Supreme Court election was held on August 6, 2026. Voters decided whether to retain two judges to the Tennessee Supreme Court through retention elections. Retained judges will keep their position for a full eight year term. Both the judges were retained for a full tenure.

== Mary L. Wagner's seat ==
Mary L. Wagner was appointed by Republican Bill Lee in February 2024. She officially took office in September 2024.

=== Endorsements ===
Replace

Political parties

- Nashville Democrats

=== Results ===
Retain Mary L. Wagner
Choice	Votes	%
Retain	625,823	72.44
Replace	238,103	27.56
Total	863,926	100.00
Source: Tennessee Secretary of State

== Kyle Hixson's seat ==
Kyle Hixson was appointed by Republican Bill Lee in January 2026. He officially took office in July 2026.

=== Endorsements ===
Replace

Political parties

- Nashville Democrats

=== Results ===
Retain Kyle Hixson
Choice	Votes	%
Retain	617,938	71.38
Replace	247,824	28.62
Total	865,762	100.00
Source: Tennessee Secretary of State
