= Jeff Cox (judge) =

American judge (born 1965)

Jeffrey Stephen Cox
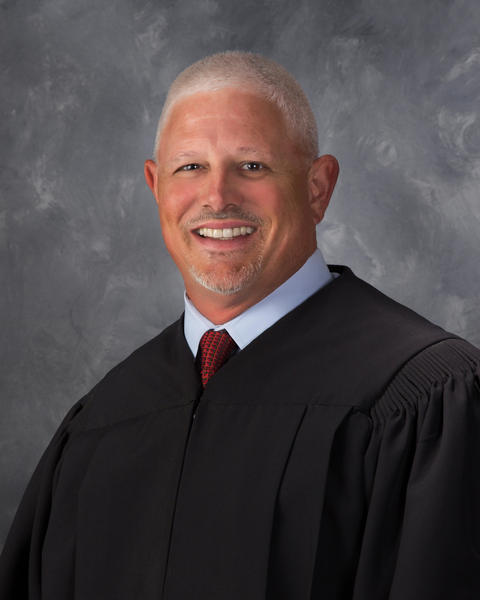
- Official portrait, 2016

Judge of the Louisiana Court of Appeal for the Second Circuit, based in Shreveport, Louisiana
- Incumbent
- Assumed office January 23, 2017
- Preceded by: James Jay Caraway

Division C Judge of the Louisiana 26th Judicial District Court for Bossier and Webster parishes
- In office 2004–2016
- Preceded by: Office established
- Succeeded by: Lane Pittard

Personal details
- Born: February 1965 (age 61) Shreveport, Louisiana, US
- Party: Republican
- Spouse: Susan Cox
- Children: 2
- Education: Louisiana Tech University Louisiana State University in Shreveport; Southern University Law Center Southern Methodist University
- Occupation: Attorney

Jeffrey Stephen Cox, known as Jeff Cox (born February 1965) is a judge of the Louisiana Court of Appeal for the Second Circuit, based in Shreveport, Louisiana.

From November 2004 until December 31, 2016, he served as one of the six judges of the 26th Judicial District Court of Bossier and Webster parishes in northwestern Louisiana. He held the Division C judgeship. He is also an instructor for the North Louisiana Criminal Justice Academy, which provides services to law enforcement officers.

== Background ==
Reared in Minden in Webster Parish, Cox was one of three sons of the former Dorothy Addison (1928-2020) and Orville D. "O. D." Cox (1927-2013) of Minden, the founder of the Hill Crest Memorial Funeral Home and Cemeteries and Hill Crest Florist in Haughton in Bossier Parish. The senior Cox also built the Hill Crest Sunrise Amphitheatre for the celebration of Easter sunrise services each year. His brothers are Philip Cox and the late Fred Cox.

Jeff Cox obtained his undergraduate degree from Louisiana Tech University in Ruston, his Master of Business Administration from Louisiana State University in Shreveport, his Juris Doctor in 1992 from the Southern University Law Center in Baton Rouge, and his Legal Law Masters in Taxation from Southern Methodist University near Dallas, Texas.

Cox is married to Susan Elaine Cox (born March 1968), a native of Irving, north of Dallas. The couple has two children, Gabrielle "Gabby" and Stephen Cox. He is a member of the First Baptist Church of Bossier City.

== Judicial career ==
Cox was elected without opposition as a district judge in November 2004, 2008, and 2014. Prior to his judgeship, Cox specialized as a practicing attorney in wills, successions, estate planning, and elder care matters. He is a former assistant district attorney for the 26th Judicial District, headed since 2003 by DA Schuyler Marvin of Minden. He formerly served on the board of Volunteers for Youth Justice and the Caddo Council on Aging in Shreveport and Bossier City. He was active in the Pro Bono Project of the Shreveport Bar Association. He is the former Bossier district chairman for the Norwella Council of the Boy Scouts of America. Judge Cox is an instructor at the Bossier Parish Sheriff's Training Academy in Plain Dealing in northern Bossier Parish. He instructs the notary preparation course at Bossier Parish Community College.

In 2011, Judge Cox presided over the capital murder trial of Robert McCoy, in which the defendant was convicted and sentenced to death after his lawyer was allowed to concede the defendant's guilt over the defendant's objection. Judge Cox denied requests by the defendant and the defendant's parents for a different defense lawyer. The case is now on appeal before the United States Supreme Court. In 2014, Judge Cox denied the request of Richard Matthew Smith (born May 1984), a No Party candidate for mayor of Springhill in northern Webster Parish, that Smith be returned to the ballot after he was ruled ineligible on residency grounds. Smith sought to oppose Mayor Carroll Breaux, an Independent. A former resident of Shongaloo, Smith was ruled ineligible to run because he had not resided in Springhill for the one year required preceding the election. The circuit court on which Judge Cox would later sit, concurred in the initial ruling.

Cox's court colleagues include Judges Jeff R. Thompson, Charles Jacobs, Mike Nerren, Parker Self, and Michael O. Craig. Cox, Nerren, Self, and Craig were all unopposed in the nonpartisan blanket primary held on November 4, 2014. Thompson also ran unopposed to succeed Judge Ford E. Stinson, Jr.; Jacobs, from Springhill, to replace the retiring John M. Robinson.

On November 8, 2016, Cox unseated the two-term Circuit Judge James Jay Caraway (born June 1953), a Democrat-turned-Republican for the Division C position on the appeals court. Cox received 58,874 votes (57 percent) to Caraway's 44,604 (43 percent). Caraway first won the position in a special election held in March 1996, when he defeated then fellow Democrat Johnny Evans.

Upon election, Cox had vowed to continue basing his decisions on the U. S. Constitution, faith and family, fair treatment of plaintiffs and defendants, Second Amendment rights, and strict interpretation of the law. In addition to Bossier and Webster, the appeal court district encompasses Bienville, Caldwell, Claiborne, Jackson, Lincoln, Union, and Winn parishes.

In 2017, after Cox had left the 26th Judicial District Court, plaintiffs James Wheat and Danny Brinson, after their arrests in Bossier City for violating a state statute forbidding panhandling, filled a class action lawsuit in the United States District Court for the Western District of Louisiana against Bossier Parish Sheriff Julian Curtis Whittington and all judges of the 26th Judicial District Court, including Chief Judge Parker Self and Judge Cox. Wheat and Brinson allege that Bossier Parish unjustly jails defendants who cannot pay for bail or the required $40 fee to the office of the public defender. Nor does Bossier Parish permit defendants to seek a lowering of the bail amount, which is instead automatically set by the court. The suit claims that the parish has for years violated a "bedrock principle of our legal system that a person cannot be detained or imprisoned solely for their inability to pay a fee. Such an incarceration violates the substantive due process and equal protection clauses of the Constitution." Cox is a defendant because he was a 26th District judge at the time of the panhandling case.

Two Republican attorneys from Bossier City, Cynthia Carroll-Bridges and Lane L. Pittard, sought to fill the remainder of Cox's term on the district court in the special election held on October 14, 2017. Pittard defeated Carroll-Bridges. Pittard (born c. 1956) is a Minden native who graduated from Minden High School and Northwestern State University in Natchitoches. He holds his legal degree from the William H. Bowen School of Law at the University of Arkansas at Little Rock. Since 2003, Pittard has been the first assistant district attorney for Bossier and Webster parishes.

Political offices
Preceded by James Jay Caraway	Judge of Louisiana Court of Appeal for the Second Circuit based in Shreveport; 2017–	Succeeded by Incumbent
