= David Mortensen =

American judge from Utah

David Mortensen is an American judge from Utah.

== Biography ==
David Mortensen graduated from the J. Reuben Clark Law School at Brigham Young University in 1993. He served as a trial attorney until 2006, when he was appointed to the 4th District Court by Utah Governor Jon M. Huntsman, Jr. He served as a presiding judge in that court for two years. On May 6, 2016, Utah Governor Gary Herbert appointed Judge David Mortensen to the Utah Court of Appeals. Herbert stated, "For the past ten years Judge Mortensen has been an example of what a judge should be, dedicated to the rule of law, hardworking, and fair to all parties." Mortensen previously served as a judge for the Fourth District Court. Mortensen is member of Utah State Bar Fee Arbitration Committee as well as member of Utah Supreme Court Advisory Committee on the Rules of Evidence.
