= Beth Kellum =

American judge

Judge of the Alabama Court of Criminal Appeals
- Incumbent
- Assumed office January 8, 2009

Personal details
- Party: Republican
- Education: University of Alabama

J. Elizabeth Kellum is an American judge who has served on the Alabama Court of Criminal Appeals since 2009. A member of the Alabama Republican Party, she has worked in law for much of her life.

== Early life and education ==
Kellum grew up in Vance, Alabama. She graduated from Brookwood High School in 1977 and went on to attend the University of Alabama. There, she received both undergraduate and law degrees while majoring in political science.

== Career ==
Kellum was first elected to the court of criminal appeals in 2008, defeating the Democratic nominee with 54% of the vote. She was subsequently re-elected in 2014 and 2020, where she fended off a Republican primary challenger.

On July 31, 2025, Kellum announced her re-election bid for the upcoming 2026 election. She ended her re-election bid in February.
