= Amparo Monique Guerra =

American judge

Texas First District Court of Appeals Place 5
- Incumbent
- Assumed office January 1, 2021
- Preceded by: Terry Adams

Personal details
- Born: 1976 or 1977 (age 48–49)
- Party: Democratic
- Education: Rice University (BA); University of Houston Law Center (JD)
- Website: Office website Campaign website

Amparo Monique Guerra (born 1976/1977) is a Justice on the Texas First Court of Appeals. Prior to serving as a Justice, Guerra served as an Associate Municipal Judge for the City of Houston.

== Early life and education ==
Guerra's mother is Justice Linda Reyna Yáñez, who served on the Texas Thirteenth Court of Appeals, becoming the first Latina to serve on any Texas appellate court. Prior to becoming a lawyer and judge, Yanez was a farmworker and teacher. Guerra graduated high school from St. George's School in Newport, Rhode Island with distinction. She was a boarding student and received a full academic scholarship. Guerra earned her Bachelor of Arts at Rice University with a double major in Latin American Studies and Sociology, making the President's Honor Roll. She earned her Juris Doctor at University of Houston Law Center where she was awarded a Dean's Merit Scholarship. During her time at law school, Guerra earned two Public Interest Fellowships. The two Fellowships were working with the Texas Rural Legal Aid and with the Farmworker Legal Services in Michigan. Guerra was a law clerk for judge Filemon Vela Sr. on the United States District Court for the Southern District of Texas.

== Career ==
In 2005, Guerra became an Associate Municipal Judge for the City of Houston. In 2019, Guerra became a Partner at Shackelford, Bowen, McKinley & Norton, LLP. In 2020, Guerra was elected a Justice on the Texas First Court of Appeals.

== Personal life ==
Guerra and her husband have three children. She is multilingual, speaking English, Spanish, Portuguese and Italian.

== Recognition ==
Guerra was named a Texas Super Lawyer.
