= Tracy Staab =

American judge

Judge of the Court of Appeals of Washington, Division III
- Incumbent
- Assumed office January 11, 2021
- Preceded by: Kevin Korsmo

Judge of the Spokane Municipal Court
- In office January 2, 2009 – January 10, 2021
- Preceded by: Position established
- Succeeded by: Kristin O’Sullivan

Personal details
- Spouse: Scott Staab
- Education: Western Washington University (BA); Seattle University (JD)
- Profession: Lawyer

Tracy Arlene Staab is a State Judge of the Washington Court of Appeals, Division III.

== Biography ==
Staab ran for election for the Division III District 1 judge of the Washington Court of Appeals. Staab won in the general election on November 3, 2020.
