= Michigan Association for Justice =

Professional association

The Michigan Association for Justice (MAJ), formerly the Michigan Trial Lawyers Association (MTLA) is a professional association of over 1,400 plaintiff's attorneys and staff, with offices in Lansing, Michigan.

MAJ provides members with professional networking, online listserves, a data bank of relevant court documents and legal experts, and a member directory. The organization also provides an extensive continuing legal education (CLE) program in locations throughout Michigan. Additionally, MAJ's Lansing-based government affairs staff lobbies legislators and state agencies to advance a pro-civil justice legislative agenda, intended to preserve and enhance the rights of injured people.

MAJ states that it "promotes justice and fairness for injured persons, safeguards victims' rights--particularly the right to trial by jury--and strengthens the civil justice system through education and disclosure of information critical to public health and safety." It provides information and professional assistance to its members. It is headquartered in Lansing, Michigan. The MAJ is an affiliated member of the American Association for Justice.

== History ==
=== Past presidents ===
- 1945 - 49 Samuel Charfoos (d)
- 1949 - 53 Hon. Theodore R. Bohn
- 1953 - 55 Benjamin Marcus (d)
- 1955 - 56 Carl Gussen (d)
- 1956 - 57 James A. Markle (d)
- 1957 - 58 Saul M. Leach
- 1958 - 59 Duane S. Van Benschoten (d)
- 1959 - 60 I. Goodman Cohen (d)
- 1960 - 61 D. Charles Marsten
- 1961 - 62 Dean A. Robb
- 1962 - 63 Max Dean
- 1963 - 64 George L. Downing
- 1964 - 65 Lee C. Dramis (d)
- 1965 - 66 Howard Silver
- 1966 - 67 James E. Burns (d)
- 1967 - 68 Cassius E. Street
- 1968 - 69 James W. Baker (d)
- 1969 - 70 Eugene D. Mossner
- 1970 - 71 Irving Kroll
- 1971 - 72 Morton E. Schneider
- 1972 - 74 Harry M. Philo
- 1974 - 75 George Bedrosian
- 1975 - 76 Sheldon L. Miller
- 1976 - 77 James F. Logan
- 1977 - 78 Clifford H. Hart
- 1978 - 79 George M. Maurer, Jr.
- 1979 - 80 Jack H. Bindes
- 1980 - 81 Jeffrey N. Shillman
- 1981 - 82 Paul A. Rosen (d)
- 1982 - 83 George T. Sinas
- 1983 - 84 Beverly Clark
- 1984 - 85 Sherwin Schreier
- 1985 - 86 Nicholas J. Rine
- 1986 - 87 Hon. William B. Murphy
- 1987 - 88 Carl R. Edwards
- 1988 - 89 Charles J. Barr
- 1989 - 90 Sheldon D. Erlich
- 1990 - 91 Barry Waldman
- 1991 - 92 Thomas Hay
- 1992 - 93 Marjory Cohen
- 1993 - 94 Michael Pianin
- 1994 - 95 Dave Getto
- 1995 - 96 Mark Weiss (d)
- 1996 - 97 Richard Skutt
- 1997 - 98 Kathy Bogas
- 1998 - 99 Carol McNeilage
- 1999 - 2000 Barry Goodman
- 2000 - 01 Jules Olsman
- 2001 - 02 Norman Tucker
- 2002 - 03 Alan Helmkamp
- 2003 - 04 Brian Waldman
- 2004 - 05 Michael Pitt
- 2005 - 06 Linda Miller Atkinson
- 2006 - 07 Jesse Reiter
- 2007 - 08 Robert Raitt
- 2008 - 09 Judy Susskind
- 2009 - 10 Richard Warsh
- 2010 - 11 Barry J. Gates
- 2011 - 12 Michael J. Behm
- 2012 - 13 Marc E. Lipton
- 2013 - 14 Gerald H. Acker
- 2014 - 15 Scott A. Goodwin
- 2015 - 16 Ven R. Johnson
- 2016 - 17 Thomas W. Waun
- 2017 - 18 Brian J. McKeen
- 2018 - 19 Debra A. Freid
- 2019 - 20 Robert J. MacDonald
- 2020 - 21 Donna M. MacKenzie
- 2021 - 22 Ronald K. Weiner
- 2022 - 23 Stuart A. Sklar
- 2023 - 24 Jennifer L. McManus
- 2024 - 25 Eric Steinberg

== Membership and governance ==
The MAJ is currently presided over by President Eric Steinberg. He works with the other officers and MAJ Executive Director Steve Pontoni, who oversees the day-to-day operation of the organization. The executive board, which meets throughout the year, is made up of 120 members including all past presidents.
