= Ryan M. Harris =

American judge

Ryan Harris

Personal details
- Education: Brigham Young University (BA); Stanford University (JD)

Ryan M. Harris is a judge on the Utah Court of Appeals. He is an associate presiding judge on the court. He has been serving in his current role since June 2017 and was previously a judge on the state's 3rd District Court from August 2011 to June 2017, having been appointed to both by Gary Herbert. He also serves as an adjunct professor at the University of Utah.
