= Utah Court of Appeals =

Intermediate appellate court of Utah

The Utah Court of Appeals is the intermediate-level appellate court for the state of Utah. It began operations in 1987.

== Jurisdiction ==
The court's jurisdiction is complementary to that of the Utah Supreme Court. The Court of Appeals hears all appeals from the Juvenile and District Courts, except those from the small claims department of a District Court. It also determines appeals from District Court involving domestic relations cases, including divorce, annulment, division of property (Utah is an "equitable distribution" state), child custody, child support, visitation, adoption and paternity, and some criminal matters (those that are not first degree felonies or capital cases). The Court also hears appeals from administrative proceedings by state agencies including the Utah Industrial Commission and the Department of Employment Security Career Service Review Board. It also hears cases transferred to it by the Supreme Court.

== Procedure ==
The panels hear oral arguments in cases during the second, third, and fourth week of the month. After hearing arguments, the judges confer together to discuss the issues raised in the case. One of the judges on the panel is assigned to write the opinion of the court. In addition to its oral argument panels, the court designates three judges to sit on the law and motion panel. This panel determines procedural and substantive motions and hears cases on one day per month.

== Judges ==
The court consists of seven judges who serve six-year renewable terms. A presiding judge is elected by majority vote to serve for two years. Court of Appeals sessions usually are conducted in Salt Lake City, but the court travels several times per year, holding court in different geographical regions of the state. The court sits and renders judgment in rotating panels of three judges. It is prohibited by statute from sitting en banc (all seven members at once).

The current judges on the court as of January 2023 are:

Name	Start	Appointer	Law School
Michele Christiansen, Presiding Judge	2010	Gary Herbert (R)	Utah
Gregory Orme	January 18, 1987	Norman Bangerter (R)	GWU
David Mortensen	July 14, 2016	Gary Herbert (R)	BYU
Ryan Harris	2017	Gary Herbert (R)	Stanford
Ryan Tenney	August 18, 2021	Spencer Cox (R)	BYU
John Luthy	October 28, 2022	Spencer Cox (R)	BYU
Amy Oliver	January 17, 2023	Spencer Cox (R)	Harvard
