= Mississippi Court of Appeals =

Appellate court in Mississippi, US

The Mississippi Court of Appeals is the intermediate-level appellate court for the state of Mississippi. A creation of the Mississippi Legislature, the court began operations in 1995 for the purpose of relieving a backlog of cases before the Supreme Court of Mississippi.

== Jurisdiction ==
The Mississippi Court of Appeals hears and decides appeals from the various trial courts of the state. The cases the court hears are assigned to it by the Supreme Court of Mississippi, and generally concern issues in which the law is already settled, but the facts are in dispute. Thus, contrary to federal procedure, Mississippi does not protect the common law right to a trial by jury, since it permits appellate review of facts found by a jury. The Supreme Court may review Court of Appeals decisions, but if the Supreme Court declines review, the decision of the Court of Appeals stands.

The court's ten judges are elected from five districts and serve eight-year terms. Non-partisan elections are staggered so that not all positions are up for election at one time. The districts coincided with Mississippi's congressional districts prior to Mississippi's losing one district in 2000. Some of the state's counties are divided between districts. However, the districts are not jurisdictional: appeals from all over the state go to the Supreme Court and may be deflected by it to the Court of Appeals.

Jim Herring, who served on the court from 1997 to 1999 under appointment of Governor Kirk Fordice, later became the state chairman of the Mississippi Republican Party.

== Judges ==
As of May 2024, there are ten judges on the Mississippi Court of Appeals:

District	Seat	Name	Start	Law School
1st	1	John Weddle	January 20, 2024	Mississippi
1st	2	Donna Barnes, Chief Judge	September 14, 2004	Mississippi
2nd	1	Deborah McDonald	January 7, 2019	Mississippi
2nd	2	Latrice Westbrooks	January 3, 2017	Detroit
3rd	1	Jack Wilson, Presiding Judge	July 1, 2015	Harvard
3rd	2	John Emfinger	March 3, 2021	Mississippi College
4th	1	Virginia Carlton, Presiding Judge	January 2007	Mississippi
4th	2	David McCarty	January 7, 2019	Mississippi College
5th	1	Anthony Lawrence	January 7, 2019	Mississippi
5th	2	Amy St. Pé	January 6, 2025	Mississippi College
