= Douglas Bahr =

American judge

Justice of the North Dakota Supreme Court
- Incumbent
- Assumed office February 1, 2023
- Appointed by: Doug Burgum
- Preceded by: Gerald VandeWalle

Personal details
- Born: 1960 or 1961 (age 64–65)
- Education: Brigham Young University (BA); University of South Dakota (JD)

Douglas Bahr (born 1960 or 1961) is an American lawyer who has served as a justice of the North Dakota Supreme Court since 2023. He served as a state court judge from 2018 to 2023.

== Education ==
Bahr received a Bachelor of Science from Brigham Young University in 1987 and a Juris Doctor from the University of South Dakota School of Law in 1990.

== Career ==
Bahr started his legal career as a law clerk to Justice Jerry L. Larson of the Iowa Supreme Court from 1990 to 1991. From 1991 to 2001, he served as assistant attorney general. From 2000 to 2016, he served as North Dakota Solicitor General and director of the Civil Litigation Division of the North Dakota Office of Attorney General. From to 2016 to 2018, he was a special counsel at the Crowley Fleck law firm. He served as an adjunct faculty member at Bismarck State College from 2008 to 2016.

== Judicial career ==
=== State district court service ===
In September 2018, Bahr was appointed by Governor Doug Burgum to serve as a judge of the South Central Judicial District Court of North Dakota. His service on the state court bench terminated when he was elevated to the supreme court.

=== North Dakota Supreme Court ===
In December 2022, Bahr was one of seven applicants who applied for the upcoming vacancy on North Dakota Supreme Court. Later that month, Bahr was one of three finalists submitted to the governor by the judicial nominating commission. On January 9, 2023, Governor Burgum appointed Bahr as an associate justice of the North Dakota Supreme Court. He fills the vacancy left by retirement of Justice Gerald W. VandeWalle on January 31, 2022. Bahr's appointment became effective on February 1, 2023.

Legal offices
Preceded by Gerald VandeWalle	Justice of the North Dakota Supreme Court; 2023–present	Incumbent
