= Greg Shaw (judge) =

American judge (born 1957)

Associate Justice of the Alabama Supreme Court
- Incumbent
- Assumed office January 20, 2009
- Preceded by: Harold See

Personal details
- Born: James Gregory Shaw; March 21, 1957 (age 69)
- Party: Republican
- Education: Auburn University (BS); Samford University (JD); University of Virginia (LLM)

James Gregory Shaw (born March 21, 1957) is an American lawyer who has served as an associate justice of the Supreme Court of Alabama since 2009. He is a member of the Republican Party. He was elected in 2008 to the seat of retiring Justice Harold See. He was sworn into office in 2009. He was re-elected in 2014. Prior to his election to the Supreme Court he served on the Alabama Court of Criminal Appeals from 2001 to 2009. He is married to former Alabama State Auditor Samantha Shaw.

He earned a Bachelor of Science degree from Auburn University and a Juris Doctor from Cumberland School of Law and a Master of Laws from the University of Virginia School of Law. Earlier in his career he worked for two other members of the Alabama Supreme Court, serving as staff attorney for Justice Janie L. Shores in 1984 and then joining the staff of Justice Gorman Houston in 1985.
