= Anthony Lawrence (judge) =

American judge (born 1965)

Judge of the Mississippi Court of Appeals
- Incumbent
- Assumed office January 7, 2019
- Preceded by: Eugene L. Fair Jr.

District Attorney for Mississippi's 19th Judicial District
- In office January 1, 2004 – January 7, 2019
- Succeeded by: Angel Myers McIlrath

Personal details
- Born: April 3, 1965 (age 61) Pascagoula, Mississippi, U.S.
- Spouse: Anita Williamson
- Children: 2
- Education: University of Southern Mississippi (BS); University of Mississippi (JD)
- Occupation: Attorney

Anthony N. "Tony" Lawrence III (born April 3, 1965) is an American judge on the Mississippi Court of Appeals.
