= Louisiana Circuit Courts of Appeal =

Intermediate appellate court of Louisiana

Court locations

The Louisiana Circuit Courts of Appeal are the intermediate appellate courts for the state of Louisiana.

There are five circuits, each covering a different group of parishes. Each circuit is subdivided into three districts.

As with the Louisiana Supreme Court, the regular judicial terms on the courts of appeal are ten years.

The courts of appeal are housed in the following cities in Louisiana:

- First Circuit – Baton Rouge
- Second Circuit – Shreveport
- Third Circuit – Lake Charles
- Fourth Circuit – New Orleans
- Fifth Circuit – Gretna

== Jurisdiction ==
The Circuit Courts of Appeal have appellate jurisdiction over all civil matters, all matters appealed from family and juvenile courts, and most criminal cases that are triable by a jury. A court of appeal also has supervisory jurisdiction to review interlocutory orders and decrees in cases which are heard in the trial courts within their geographical circuits. One unique feature of the Courts of Appeal of Louisiana is that they are able to review questions of fact, as well as questions of law, in civil cases. In appeals of criminal cases, however, the appellate jurisdiction of the courts of appeal extends only to questions of law.

== 1st Circuit ==
Parishes Included:

- 1st District: Ascension, Assumption, Iberville, Lafourche, Pointe Coupee, St. Mary, Terrebonne, and West Baton Rouge
- 2nd District: East Baton Rouge
- 3rd District: East Feliciana, Livingston, St. Helena, St. Tammany, Tangipahoa, Washington, and West Feliciana

Circuit Seat: First Circuit Courthouse (Baton Rouge)

Current judges
Name	Start	District	Subdistrict	Election Section	Division	Party
Vanessa Guidry-Whipple, Chief Judge	1991	1			D	Democratic
Mike McDonald	2003	2	1		B	Republican
Page McClendon	2002	3			B	Republican
Duke Welch	2004	2	1		C	Republican
Mitchell Theriot	2012	1			B	Republican
Guy Holdridge	2015	1		1	C	Republican
Wayne Chutz	2015	3			A	Republican
Allison Penzato	2017	3			C	Republican
Walter Lanier	2019	1		1	A	Republican
Elizabeth Wolfe	2020	3			D	Republican
Christopher Hester	2021	2	1		A	Republican
Vacant	2025	2	2		D	

=== Vacancies and pending nomination ===
Vacator	Reason	Vacancy Date	District	Subdistrict	Election Section	Division	Nominee	Nomination Date
John Guidry	Elevation	January 1, 2025	2	2		D	TBD	Pending

== 2nd Circuit ==
Parishes Included: Bienville, Bossier, Caddo, Caldwell, Claiborne, DeSoto, East Carroll, Franklin, Jackson, Lincoln, Madison, Morehouse, Ouachita, Red River, Richland, Tensas, Union, Webster, West Carroll, Winn

Circuit Seat: Second Circuit Courthouse (Shreveport)

Current judges
Name	Start	District	Election Section	Division	Party
Frances Jones Pitman, Chief Judge	2012	3	2	B	Republican
Shonda Stone	2016	3	1	A	Democratic
Jeff Cox	2017	2		C	Republican
James Stephens	2018	1	2	A	Independent
Jeff Thompson	2019	2	2	B	Republican
Jeff Robinson	2021	2	1	A	Republican
Marcus Hunter	2021	1	1	C	Democratic
Craig Marcotte	2022	3	2	C	Republican
Danny Ellender	2023	1	2	B	Republican

== 3rd Circuit ==
Parishes Included: Acadia, Allen, Avoyelles, Beauregard, Calcasieu, Cameron, Catahoula, Concordia, Evangeline, Grant, Iberia, Jefferson Davis, Lafayette, LaSalle, Natchitoches, Rapides, Sabine, St. Landry, St. Martin, Vermilion, Vernon

Circuit Seat: Third Circuit Courthouse (Lake Charles)

Current judges
Name	Start	District	Election Section	Division	Party
Sylvia Cooks, Chief Judge	1992	3	2	D	Democratic
Elizabeth Pickett	1997	1		A	Independent
Billy Ezell	2003	2	2	B	Republican
Shannon Gremillion	2008	1		C	Democratic
John Conery	2013	3	3	E	Republican
Kent Savoie	2015	2	2	A	Republican
Van Kyzar	2017	1		B	Democratic
Candyce Perret	2017	1		B	Republican
Jonathan Perry	2019	3	4	F	Republican
Sharon Wilson	2021	2	1	C	Democratic
Charlie Fitzgerald	2021	3	5	A	Republican
Gary Ortego	2022	3	3	E	Republican

== 4th Circuit ==
Parishes Included: Orleans, Plaquemines, St. Bernard

Circuit Seat: Fourth Circuit Courthouse (New Orleans)

Current judges
Name	Start	District	Division	Party
Terri Love, Chief Judge	2000	1	E	Democratic
Edwin Lombard	2003	1	A	Democratic
Roland Belsome	2004	At large		Democratic
Daniel Dysart	2010	3	A	Independent
Joyce Cossich Lobrano	2010	2	A	Republican
Rosemary Ledet	2010	1	G	Democratic
Sandra Cabrina Jenkins	2012	1	H	Democratic
Paula Brown	2017	1	C	Democratic
Tiffany Chase	2017	1	B	Democratic
Dale Atkins	2018	1	F	Democratic

== 5th Circuit ==
Parishes Included: Jefferson, St. Charles, St. James, St. John the Baptist

Circuit Seat: Fifth Circuit Courthouse (Gretna)

Current judges
Name	Start	Division	Party
Susan Chehardy, Chief Judge	1998	D	Independent
Fredericka Wicker	2006	B	Republican
Jude Gravois	2011	H	Democratic
Marc Johnson	2009	C	Democratic
Robert Chaisson	2011	I	Democratic
Stephen Windhorst	2012	E	Republican
Hans Liljeberg	2012	F	Republican
John Molaison	2018	G	Republican

=== Judicial misconduct scandal ===
In May 2007, Jerrold Peterson, staff director for the court, wrote a letter alleging that, starting in 1994, criminal pro se petitions were not being reviewed by a panel of three judges as required by Louisiana law. Instead, every pro se petition received a boilerplate response. At least 5,000 petitions have been disregarded under this policy over a 12-year period. On May 21, 2007, Peterson committed suicide at the age of 55.
