= Alabama Forestry Association =

Forestry organization in Alabama

- Formation: May 6, 1949
- Headquarters: 555 Alabama Street, Montgomery, Alabama
- Members: Over 7000 (2025)
- Website: alaforestry.org

The Alabama Forestry Association (AFA) is a non-profit organization based in the U.S. state of Alabama that specializes in companies and individuals associated with the forest industry.

== History ==
The AFA was founded on May 6, 1949, by a group that consisted of sawmill owners. It was founded as the Alabama Forest Products Association, and changed its name to the Alabama Forestry Association on February 2, 1972. The organization is considered the most influential forestry organization in the state.

== Politics ==
The organization is known for its political endorsements, through the ForestPAC. It generally endorses candidates for congressional elections and state elections.
