= Daniel W. Greear =

West Virginia politician

Dan Greear
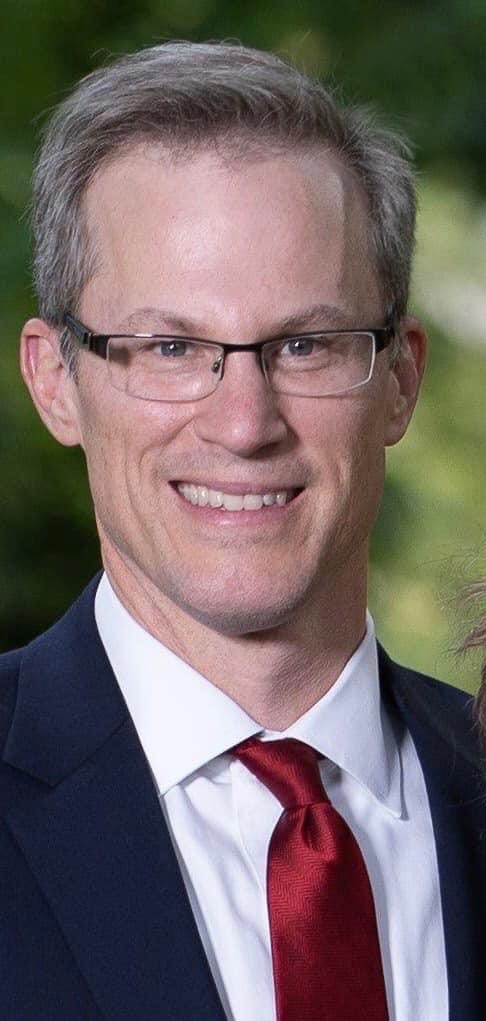
- Greear in 2023

Personal details
- Born: July 26, 1968 (age 58) Kanawha County, West Virginia, U.S.
- Party: Republican
- Education: Liberty University (BA); West Virginia University (JD)

Daniel W. Greear (born on July 26, 1968) is an American lawyer and politician. He served in the West Virginia House of Delegates, representing Kanawha County from 1995 to 1996. In 2021 to 2026 he has acted as a judge at the Intermediate Court of Appeals of West Virginia.

== Early life and education ==
Daniel W. Greear was born on July 26, 1968, and raised in Kanawha County. Greear graduated from South Charleston High School. He earned his bachelor's degree in political science from Liberty University in 1989 and later obtained his Juris Doctor degree from West Virginia University College of Law in 1992.

== Career ==
Before his judicial appointments, Greear was a managing member of KKB, LLC, focusing on general civil litigation. He served in the West Virginia House of Delegates, representing Kanawha County from 1995 to 1996.

Greear served as chief counsel for the West Virginia House of Delegates. He also served three years as chief of staff for the House of Delegates. Governor Jim Justice had previously appointed Greear to the circuit court bench in Kanawha County, where he served from July 2018 to November 2018. From 2013 to 2014, he held the position of chief counsel for the West Virginia Attorney General's Office.

In 2021, Governor Jim Justice appointed Greear to one of the three seats on the newly established Intermediate Court of Appeals of West Virginia. Upon his appointment, he assumed the position of chief judge, a term which concluded at the end of 2023. His current tenure on the court will extend until December 31, 2026. Greear ran for re-election in 2026. He was defeated in the May 2026 general election by Jim Douglas.
