= H. L. Kirkpatrick =

American judge (born 1951)

Kirk Kirkpatrick

Justice of the West Virginia Supreme Court of Appeals
- Incumbent
- Assumed office June 12, 2026
- Preceded by: Gerald Titus

Personal details
- Born: Harry Louis Kirkpatrick III; 1951 (age 74–75) Beckley, West Virginia, U.S.
- Party: Republican
- Spouse: Rebecca Nicewonder
- Children: 2
- Education: University of Kentucky (BA); West Virginia University (JD)

Harry Louis "Kirk" Kirkpatrick III (born 1951), abbreviated H. L. or H.L., is a West Virginia judge serving as a justice of the West Virginia Supreme Court of Appeals since 2026. He previously served as a judge of the Raleigh County Circuit Court. Kirkpatrick was appointed by Governor Gaston Caperton in 1995 to serve as a circuit judge on the Tenth Judicial District in Raleigh County, where he served from 1996 to 2024.

== Biography ==
Harry Louis Kirkpatrick III was born in Beckley, West Virginia and grew up in Fayette and Raleigh Counties. He is a graduate of Woodrow Wilson High School (Beckley, West Virginia), University of Kentucky, and the West Virginia University College of Law.

=== Judicial service ===
Kirkpatrick served as a lawyer for more than twenty years until he was appointed to serve as a circuit judge of the Tenth Judicial Circuit in 1995 by then-West Virginia Governor Gaston Caperton. Kirkpatrick assumed office in 1996 and was re-elected in 2000, 2008, and 2016.

Kirkpatrick announced in November 2023 that he would not run for re-election after nearly 29 years on the bench. He had been chief judge from 2016 to 2024. He retired at the end of 2024, but stated he would preside over the murder trial of Natalie Cochran, a former pharmacist and fraudster who was then convicted of murdering her husband Michael Cochran in 2019 by poisoning him with insulin and sentenced by Kirkpatrick to life in prison without the possibility of parole.

In May 2026, Kirkpatrick was elected to the Supreme Court of Appeals of West Virginia, defeating incumbent Judge Gerald Titus.

Legal offices
Preceded by Gerald Titus	Justice of the West Virginia Supreme Court of Appeals; 2026–present	Incumbent
