= Intermediate Court of Appeals of West Virginia =

Appellate court in West Virginia, US

The Intermediate Court of Appeals of West Virginia is the intermediate appellate court in West Virginia, created pursuant to the West Virginia Appellate Reorganization Act of 2021.

== Jurisdiction ==
It has jurisdiction over the following appeals, subject to further appeal to the Supreme Court of Appeals:

- Final judgments or orders of a circuit court in civil cases, entered after June 30, 2022.
- Final judgments or orders of a family court, entered after June 30, 2022, except for final judgments or final orders issued by a family court in any domestic violence petition which appeals shall first be made to a circuit court.
- Final judgments or orders of a circuit court concerning guardianship or conservatorship matters, entered after June 30, 2022.
- Final judgments, orders, or decisions of an agency or an administrative law judge entered after June 30, 2022. (Previously such orders were appealed to the Circuit Court of Kanawha County).
- Final orders or decisions of the Health Care Authority issued prior to June 30, 2022, in a certificate of need review.
- Final orders or decisions issued by the Insurance Commissioner's Office of Judges after June 30, 2022, and prior to its termination, on September 30, 2022.
- Final orders or decisions of the Workers’ Compensation Board of Review entered after June 30, 2022.

The court has no original jurisdiction and no criminal jurisdiction.

In matters involving a question of fundamental public importance, or cases in which time is of the essence, either party may petition that the court be bypassed and the case heard by the Supreme Court of Appeals.

== Opinions ==
The court is required to issue a written opinion on every case properly before it. These opinions are binding precedent, unless overruled on further appeal to the Supreme Court of Appeals or the United States Supreme Court.

== Location ==
The court is empowered to hold court at any county seat in the state.

The court system purchased the City Center East office building in the Kanawha City neighborhood of Charleston, and the court is housed there. A court room was constructed on the first floor of the building.

The court decided to hold hearings, as appropriate, in Grant, Lewis, Morgan, Raleigh and Wetzel counties, when the lawyers involved reside in those regions. In those cases it will use existing county owned facilities.

== Judges ==
The court consists of three judges. Each are elected on a non-partisan basis for ten year terms.

In the event that a judge is recused the Chief Justice of the Supreme Court of Appeals shall appoint a current circuit judge to temporary duty on the court.

=== Current Judges ===
As of June 2024, the current judges are:

Name	Start	Next Election	Law School
Ryan White	January 1, 2025	2034	WVU
Dan Greear	July 1, 2022	2026	WVU
Charles Lorensen	July 1, 2022	2028	WVU

The 2021 act creating the court provided that the Governor would appoint the original judges for staggered terms. On December 29, 2021, Governor Jim Justice appointed the three original judges to the court, who all took office on July 1, 2022. Thomas E. Scarr of Huntington, Daniel W. Greear of Charleston, Charles Lorensen of Charleston were appointed to terms ending in 2024, 2026, and 2028 respectively. Originally, Donald A. Nickerson, Jr. of Wheeling was appointed instead of Lorensen, but he declined the appointment, stating that did not wish to relocate to Charleston.

=== Election of 2024 ===
Judge Scarr declined to run for the full elected term. The election was held on a non-partisan basis. Three candidates filed for the seat. Elgine Hecteta McArdale, a Wheeling attorney; Mychal S. Schulz, a Charleston attorney; and S. Ryan White, also a Charleston attorney and member of the county school board. White won with 59% of the vote and took office on January 1, 2025.
