= L. Georgi DiStefano =

Social work and drug abuse scholar

Laura Georgi DeStafano is a Licensed Clinical Social Worker (LCSW) who served as the Executive Director/Clinical Director for the San Diego State University’s Center for Alcohol & Drug Studies, Driving Under the Influence Program, from 2001-2013.

DiStefano received her Bachelor of Arts (B.A.) degree with highest honors from Richmond College (now called College of Staten Island) and her Masters in Social Work degree from the State University of New York at Stony Brook.

== Career ==
DiStefano conceived The Paradigm Developmental Model of Treatment (PDMT) in 2004. Working with Melinda “Mindy” Hohman, Ph.D., it has been adapted for multiple DUI offenders. Together they wrote and published in 2010. She followed it up in April 2012, when DiStefano published her second book: Paradigm Developmental Model of Treatment GROUP TOPICS. The PDMT Companion Workbook for DUI and Substance Abuse Treatment Programs.

DiStefano is an international trainer with the High Conflict Institute teaching workplace conflict resolution and in her private practice, provides EAP services to ValueOptions and Anthem Blue Cross. Previously, she managed the Kaiser EAP program San Diego, California, coordinating the Critical Incident Team and working with the Threat Management Committee.
