= No-show job =

Form of corruption where one is paid to not show up

A no-show job or fictitious employment is a paid position that ostensibly requires the holder to perform duties, but for which no work, or even attendance, is actually expected. The awarding of no-show jobs is a form of political or corporate corruption.

A no-work job is a similar paid position for which no work is expected, but for which attendance at the job site is required. Upon auditing or inspection, personnel assigned to a no-work job may be falsely justified to the controllers as waiting for work tasks or not being needed "right now." For example: no-show or no-work jobs may be used during illegal activities for scamming a construction project to generate extra payout or to provide alibis.

== Organized crime and corruption ==
The New York Times has written: "The no-show job has long played a central role in the annals of crime and corruption in New York, offering an efficient way for crooked politicians, union officials, mobsters and all manner of miscreants to funnel kickbacks and bribes to friends, family members, business associates and even themselves". Philip Carlo, in his biography of Anthony "Gaspipe" Casso, writes that no-show jobs are "a classic Mafia setup" and that such positions were highly prized among mobsters. A 2012 report of the Waterfront Commission of New York Harbor found that "no-show jobs held by relatives of mobsters and other well-connected people continue to vex government officials trying to make the ports more efficient and more competitive".

In the past, no-show jobs were also an aspect of corruption in Boston. No-show jobs continue to play a role in corruption cases in Chicago, where they have had a long history.

== Corporate fraud ==
In the corporate world, "no-show" employees—also called ghost employees—usually have some family or personal relationship to a manager or supervisor. In the corporate world, this is considered a type of payroll fraud. Fraud audits seek to detect such practices. For example, the Los Angeles Clippers salary cap scandal involved a paid "no-show" job for National Basketball Association (NBA) star Kawhi Leonard, paying him an additional $28 million for no work, thereby circumventing the NBA salary cap. The NBA investigated and ultimately imposed penalties on Leonard, Clippers owner Steve Ballmer, and the Clippers.

== Tax consequences ==
Somewhat related to the aforementioned practice, in jurisdictions with progressive income taxation business owners may place non-arms-length persons (especially family members) on their payroll at salaries for which they perform no work, or alternatively perform limited duties which an arms-length employee would be willing to perform for substantially lower compensation. This results in the salary, if being subject to any tax at all, being taxed at a much lower rate than if the owners had paid themselves the same gross compensation in addition to the salary and/or dividends declared. This practice is generally considered tax evasion by government revenue authorities, as opposed to tax avoidance, although proving tax evasion in such cases can be difficult.

== See also ==
- Featherbedding
- Ghost soldiers
- Ñoqui
- nonjob
- Sinecure – the same but legal
- White monkey
- Ghost network
