= Economy of Norfolk, Virginia =

Since Norfolk serves as the commercial and cultural center for the geographical region of Hampton Roads (and in its political structure of independent cities), it can be difficult to separate the economic characteristics of Norfolk, from that of the region as a whole. The waterways which almost completely surround the Hampton Roads region also play an important part in the local economy. As a strategic location at the mouth of the Chesapeake Bay, its protected deep water channels serve as major arteries for the import and export of goods from across the Mid-Atlantic, Mid-West, and international destinations, as well as being the location of the world's largest naval base.

== Military ==
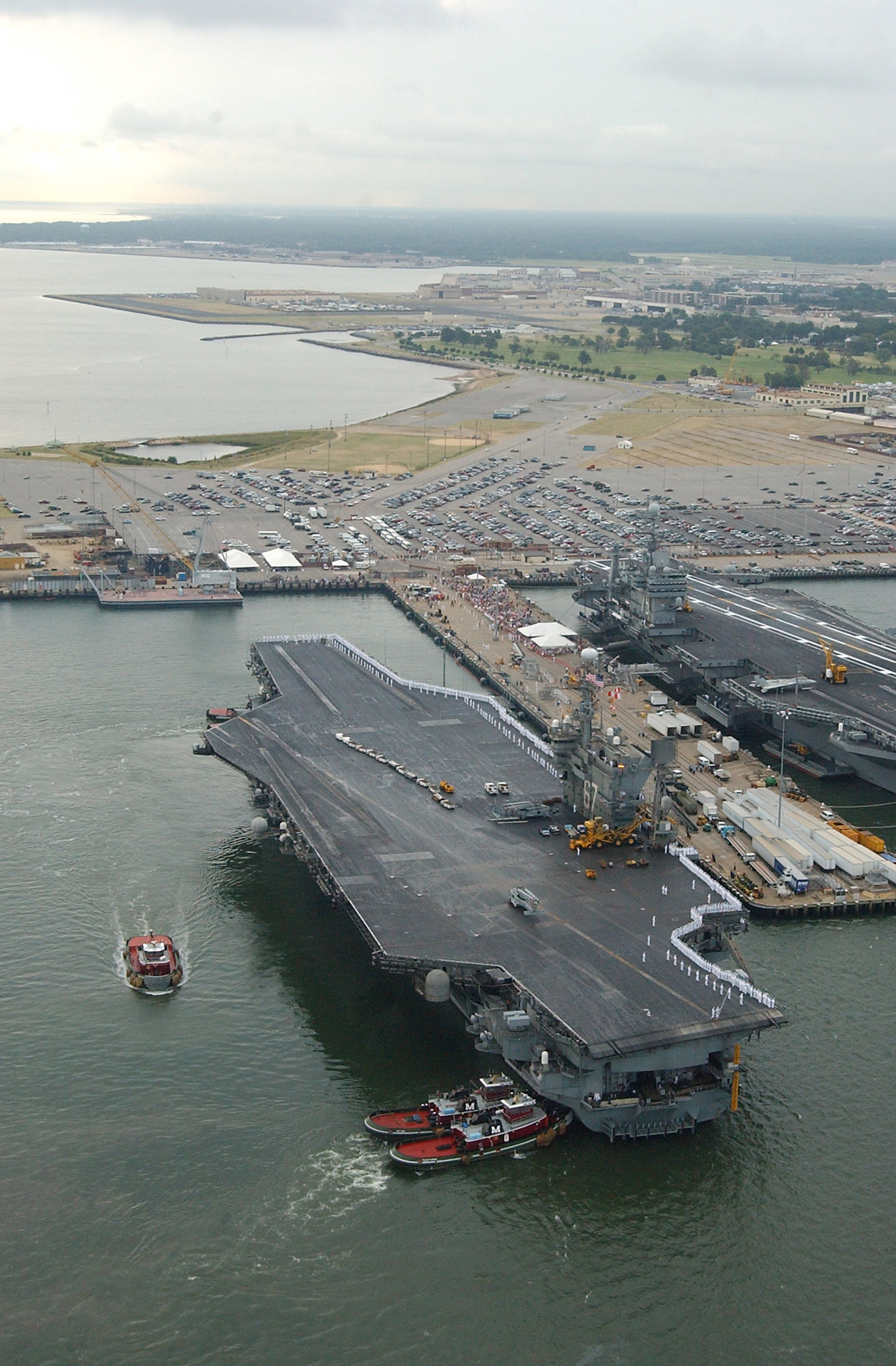
USS John F. Kennedy (CV-67) arriving at Naval Station Norfolk

Hampton Roads is a major military center, particularly for the United States Navy, and Norfolk serves as the home for the most important of these regional installations, Naval Station Norfolk. Located on Sewell's Point Peninsula, in the northwest corner of the city, the installation is the current headquarters of the Atlantic Fleet, as well as being home port for the 2nd Fleet, which compromises approximately 62,000 active duty personnel, 75 ships, and 132 aircraft. Norfolk is also home to Naval Support Activity Hampton Roads, the headquarters to the Allied Command Transformation (NATO) and the United States Joint Forces Command.

The region also plays an important role in defense contracting, with particular emphasis in the shipbuilding and ship repair businesses for the city of Norfolk. Major private shipyards located in Norfolk include: BAE Systems Ship Repair, Colonna's Shipyard, and NASSCO. Most contracts fulfilled by these shipyards are issued by the Navy, though some private commercial repair also takes place.

When combined with other important regional military installations such as Naval Air Station Oceana, Norfolk Naval Shipyard (in Portsmouth), Langley Air Force Base, and Naval Amphibious Base Little Creek, and along with other important defense contractors, the military serves as the region's economic backbone and cultural focal point. As of 2004, it was estimated that over 35% of Gross Regional Product (which includes the entire Norfolk-Newport News-Virginia Beach MSA), was attributable to defense spending, and 75% of all regional growth since 2001 was attributable to increases in defense spending.

== Commercial ports ==
After the military, the 2nd largest and most important industry for Hampton Roads and Norfolk based on economic impact are the region's cargo ports. Headquartered in Norfolk, the Virginia Port Authority (VPA) is a Commonwealth of Virginia owned-entity that, in turn, owns and operates three major port facilities in Hampton Roads for break-bulk and container type cargo. In Norfolk, Norfolk International Terminals (NIT) represents one of those three facilities and is the location of the world's largest and fastest container cranes. Together, the 3 terminals of the VPA handled a total of over 2 million TEUs and 475,000 tons of breakbulk cargo in 2006, making it the 2nd* busiest port on the east coast of North America by total cargo volume after the Port of New York and New Jersey. In addition, just across the Elizabeth River in Portsmouth, Maersk is spending $450 million to open the largest container terminal on the East Coast sometime in late 2007.

In addition to NIT, Norfolk is home to Lambert's Point Docks, the largest coal trans-shipment point in the Northern Hemisphere, with annual throughput of approximately 48 million tons. Bituminous coal is primarily sourced from the Appalachian mountains in western Virginia, West Virginia, and Kentucky. The coal is loaded onto trains and sent to the port where it is unloaded onto large breakbulk cargo ships and destined for New England, Europe, and Asia primarily.

Most major shipping lines have a permanent presence in the region with some combination of sales, distribution, and/or logistical offices, many of which are located in Norfolk. In addition, many of the largest international shipping companies have chosen Norfolk as their North American headquarters. These companies are either located at the Norfolk World Trade Center building or have constructed buildings in the Lake Wright Executive Center office park. Among them include:

- CMA CGM - The French firm and world's 3rd largest shipping line has its North American headquarters in Norfolk.
- Zim Integrated Shipping Services - An Israeli owned shipping line and the 13th largest in the world, also has its North American headquarters in Norfolk.
- Maersk Line Limited - A subsidiary of the world's largest shipping line, A.P. Moller-Maersk Group, specializing in US government shipping contracts.

== Tourism ==
Though Virginia Beach and Williamsburg have traditionally been the centers of tourism for the region, the rebirth of downtown Norfolk and the construction of a cruise ship pier at the foot of Nauticus in downtown has driven tourism to become an increasingly important part of the city's economy. The number of cruise ship passengers who visited Norfolk increased from 50,000 in 2003, to 107,000 in 2004 and 2005. Also in April 2007, the city completed construction on a $36 million state-of-the-art cruise ship terminal alongside the pier. Partly due to this construction, passenger counts dropped to 70,000 in 2006, but is expected to rebound to 90,000 in 2007, and higher in later years. Unlike most cruise ship terminals which are located in industrial areas, the downtown location of Norfolk's terminal has received favorable reviews from both tourists and the cruise lines who enjoy its proximity to the city's hotels, restaurants, shopping, and cultural amenities.

In 2007, the city opened the Half Moone Cruise Center, a passenger terminal located downtown next to Nauticus. The facility serves major cruise lines including Carnival Cruise Line, which began offering year-round sailings from Norfolk in 2025 following a major expansion agreement with the city.

== Companies headquartered in Norfolk ==
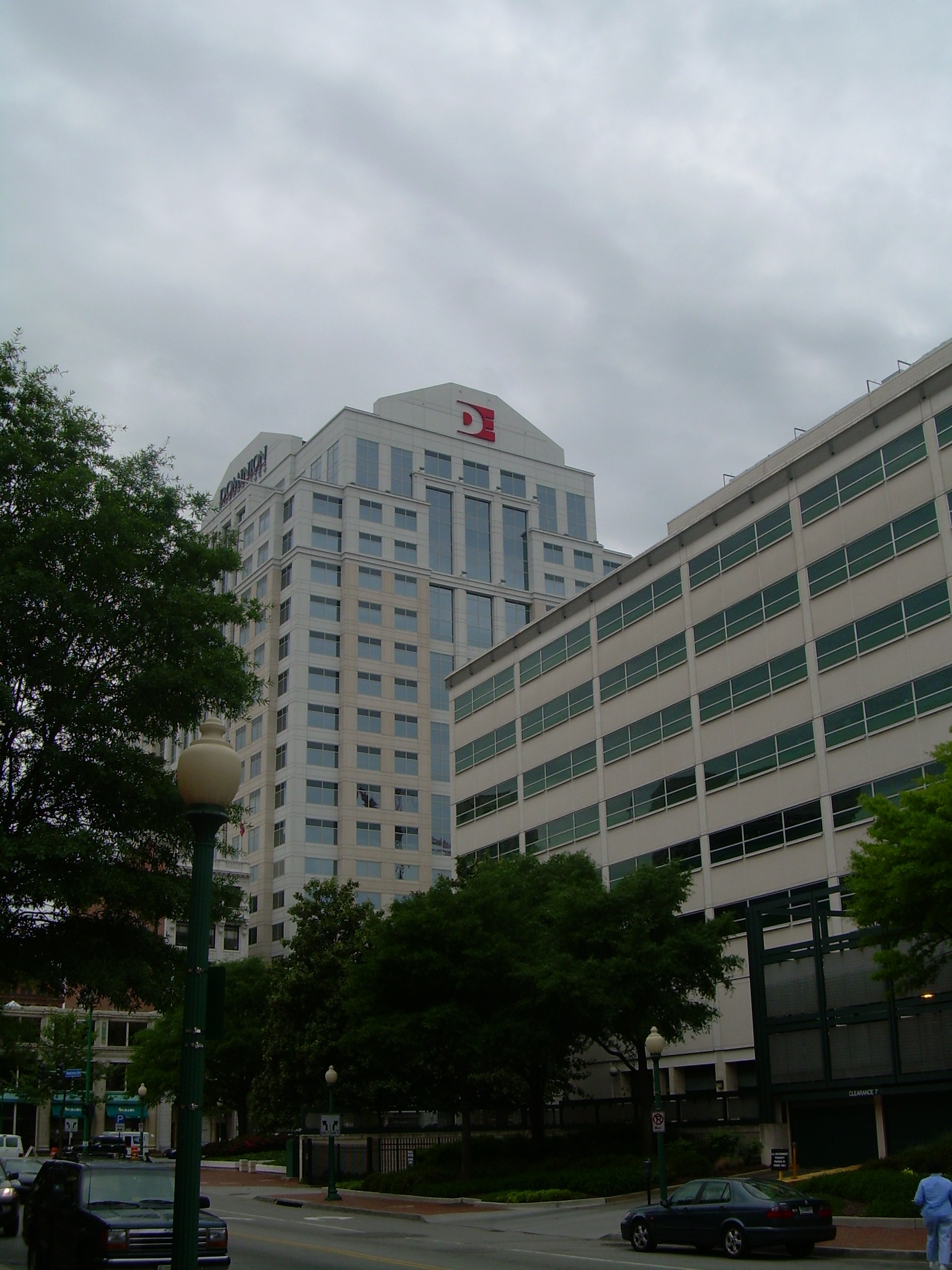
Trader Square, headquarters of Dominion Enterprises

- BlackHawk Products Group - provides tactical gear such as holsters, body armor, and backpacks to the U.S. Defense Department and law enforcement agencies throughout the world.
- FHC Health Systems, one of the top 250 largest private companies in the US, specializing in health care management (ValueOptions), health services, and online medical reports.
- Landmark Communications, one of the country's largest privately owned media companies with ownership of several daily newspapers, local TV stations, specialty publications, and most famously, The Weather Channel and weather.com.
  - Dominion Enterprises, a wholly owned subsidiary of Landmark Communications, a print and internet media group that includes numerous specialty publications and online classifieds. The company recently finished construction on a headquarters in downtown.
- Lombart Instrument, the largest distributor of ophthalmic instruments based in the United States.
- Portfolio Recovery Associates Ticker: PRAA, primary business is the purchase, collection, and management of defaulted customer receivables.
- Sentara Healthcare - a nonprofit healthcare organization that operates ten hospitals
  - Optima Health - a health management organization
- MDV Nash Finch
