= Medical data breach =

Data breach of health information

Medical data, including patients' identity information, health status, disease diagnosis and treatment, and biogenetic information, not only involve patients' privacy but also have a special sensitivity and important value, which may bring physical and mental distress and property loss to patients and even negatively affect social stability and national security once leaked. However, the development and application of medical AI must rely on a large amount of medical data for algorithm training, and the larger and more diverse the amount of data, the more accurate the results of its analysis and prediction will be. However, the application of big data technologies such as data collection, analysis and processing, cloud storage, and information sharing has increased the risk of data leakage. In the United States, the rate of such breaches has increased over time, with 176 million records breached by the end of 2017.

== Black market for health data ==
In February 2015 an NPR report claimed that organized crime networks had ways of selling health data in the black market.

In 2015 a Beazley employee estimated that medical records could sell on the black market for US$40-50.

== How data is lost ==
Theft, data loss, hacking, and unauthorized account access are ways in which medical data breaches happen. Among reported breaches of medical information in the United States networked information systems accounted for the largest number of records breached. There are many data breaches happening in the US health care system, among business associates of the health care providers that continuously gain access to patients' data.

== List of data breaches ==
- In May 2024, MediSecure suffered a cyberattack involving ransomware in Australia.
- In May 2021, the Health Service Executive in the Republic of Ireland was the victim of a cyberattack involving ransomware, in the Health Service Executive cyberattack, with admission records and test results present in a sample of the data reviewed by the Financial Times.
- In October 2018, the Centers for Medicare and Medicaid Services in the US reported that around 75,000 individual records had been affected by a data breach that took place through the ACA Agent and Broker Portal.
- In 2018, Social Indicators Research published the scientific evidence of 173,398,820 (over 173 million) individuals affected in USA from October 2008 (when the data were collected) to September 2017 (when the statistical analysis took place).
- In 2015, Anthem Inc. lost data for 37 million people in the Anthem medical data breach
- In 2014 4.5 million people using Complete Health Systems had their data stolen
- In 2013-14 1 million people using Montana Department of Public Health and Human Services had their data stolen
- In 2013 4 million people using Advocate Health and Hospitals Corporation had their data stolen
- In 2011 4.9 million users of Tricare services had their data stolen due to an employee error by Science Applications International Corporation
- In 2011 1.9 million people using Health Net had their data stolen
- In 2011 1 million people using Nemours Foundation had their data stolen
- In 2010 6800 people using New York-Presbyterian Hospital and Columbia University Medical Center had their data breached. In response, those organizations agreed to pay the United States Department of Health and Human Services a US$4.8 million dollar fine.
- In 2009 1 million people using BlueCross BlueShield of Tennessee had their data stolen

== Regulation ==
In the United States, the Health Insurance Portability and Accountability Act and Health Information Technology for Economic and Clinical Health Act require companies to report data breaches to affected individuals and the federal government.

- Health Information Privacy Health Insurance Portability and Accountability Act of 1996 (HIPAA). - 45 CFR Parts 160 and 164, Standards for Privacy of Individually Identifiable Health Information and Security Standards for the Protection of Electronic Protected Health Information. HIPAA includes provisions designed to save health care businesses money by encouraging electronic transactions, as well as regulations to protect the security and confidentiality of patient information. The Privacy Rule became effective April 14, 2001, and most covered entities (health plans, health care clearinghouses, and health care providers that conduct certain financial and administrative transactions electronically) had until April 2003 to comply. This security provision became effective April 21, 2003. The Health Insurance Portability and Accountability Act (HIPAA) is the baseline set of federal regulations governing medical information. It does three things: i. i. i.Establish a structure for how personal health information is disclosed and establish the rights of individuals with respect to health information; ii.Specify security standards for the retention and transmission of electronic patient information; iii.Need a common format and data structure for the electronic exchange of health information.
- California-Specific Laws California’s medical privacy laws, primarily the Confidentiality of Medical Information Act (CMIA), the data breach sections of the Civil Code, and sections of the Health and Safety Code, provide HIPAA-like protections, although the terminology is different. HIPAA establishes a federal "minimum standard" that applies where there are gaps in California law, and HIPAA also specifies that stricter state laws will override or supersede HIPAA. California's health care privacy laws apply to providers who provide personal health records (PHR), while HIPAA only applies when the provider providing the PHR is a business associate of a covered entity. Federal law does not grant individuals the right to file a lawsuit in the event of a data breach (only the Attorney General can file a lawsuit), but California law does. This means that California law sets a higher standard for medical privacy, and that individuals in California enjoy stronger legal protections and more ways to hold entities that violate their medical privacy accountable.
- In the UK, the legal framework for how patient data is cared for and processed is the Data Protection Act 2018 (DPA), which incorporates the EU General Data Protection Regulation (GDPR) into law, and the common law duty of confidentiality (CLDC). The data protection legislation requires that the collection and processing of personal data be fair, lawful and transparent. This means that the collection and processing of data as defined by data protection legislation must always have a valid lawful basis and must also meet the requirements of the CLDC.
- In the China, Article 18 of the "National Health Care Big Data Standards, Security and Services Management Measures (for Trial Implementation)" (National Health Planning and Development (2018) No. 23) promulgated by the National Health Care Commission in 2018 states, "The responsible unit shall adopt measures such as data classification, important data backup, and encryption authentication to guarantee the security of health care big data." However, the scope and definition of important data are not covered. Although the "Information Security Technology-Healthcare Data Security Guide" (the "Guide") issued by the National Standardization Committee also proposes that important data should be evaluated and approved in accordance with the regulations, there is likewise no definition of the connotation and definition of important data.

== See also ==
- Computer security § Medical systems
- Medical privacy
- Data loss
- Data breach
