= Gnocchi =

Small pasta-like dough dumplings

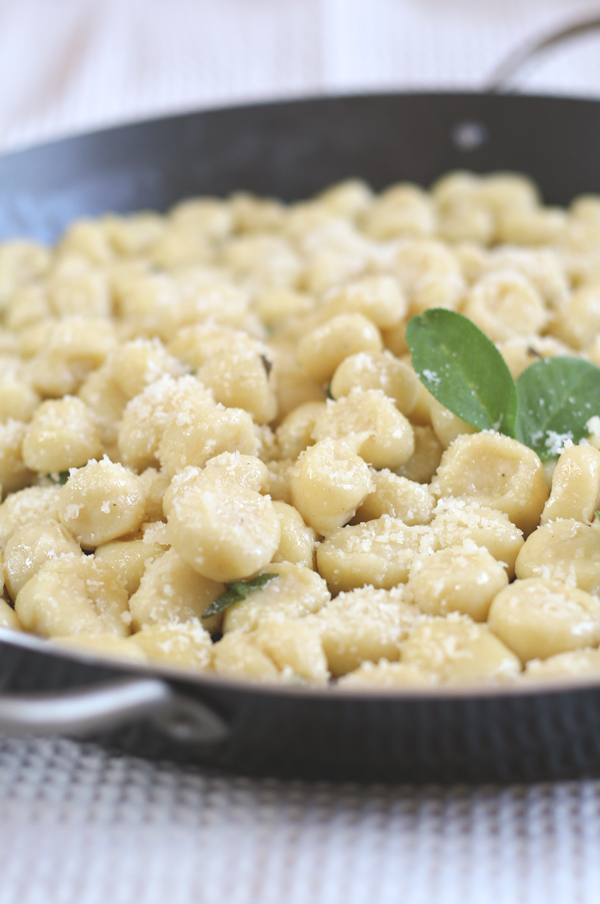
- Gnocchi of ricotta cheese dressed in butter and sage
- Type: Dumpling
- Course: Primo (Italian course)
- Place of origin: Italy
- Main ingredients: Potatoes, semolina, wheat flour, breadcrumbs, sometimes eggs, cheese, durum
- Similar dishes: Gnudi

Gnocchi (Note: /ˈn(j)ɒki/ N(Y)OK-ee, US also /ˈn(j)oʊki, ˈn(j)ɔːki/ N(Y)OH-kee, N(Y)AW-; Italian: [ˈɲɔkki]; sing.: gnocco.) are a varied family of pasta-like dumplings in Italian cuisine. They are made of small rolls of dough, such as those composed of a simple combination of wheat flour, potato, egg, and salt. Variations of the dish supplement the simple recipe with flavour additives, such as semolina flour, cheese, breadcrumbs, cornmeal or similar ingredients, and possibly including herbs, vegetables, and other ingredients. Base ingredients may be substituted with alternatives, such as sweet potatoes for potatoes or rice flour for wheat flour. Such variations are often considered to be non-traditional.

Gnocchi are commonly cooked in salted boiling water and then dressed with various sauces. They are usually eaten as a first course (primo) as an alternative to soups (minestre) or pasta, but they can also be served as a contorno (side dish) to some main courses. Common accompaniments of gnocchi include melted butter with sage, pesto, and various sauces. Gnocchi may be homemade, made by specialty stores or produced industrially and distributed refrigerated, dried or frozen. Small soup gnocchi are sometimes made by pressing the dough through a coarse sieve or a perforated spoon.

== Origin ==
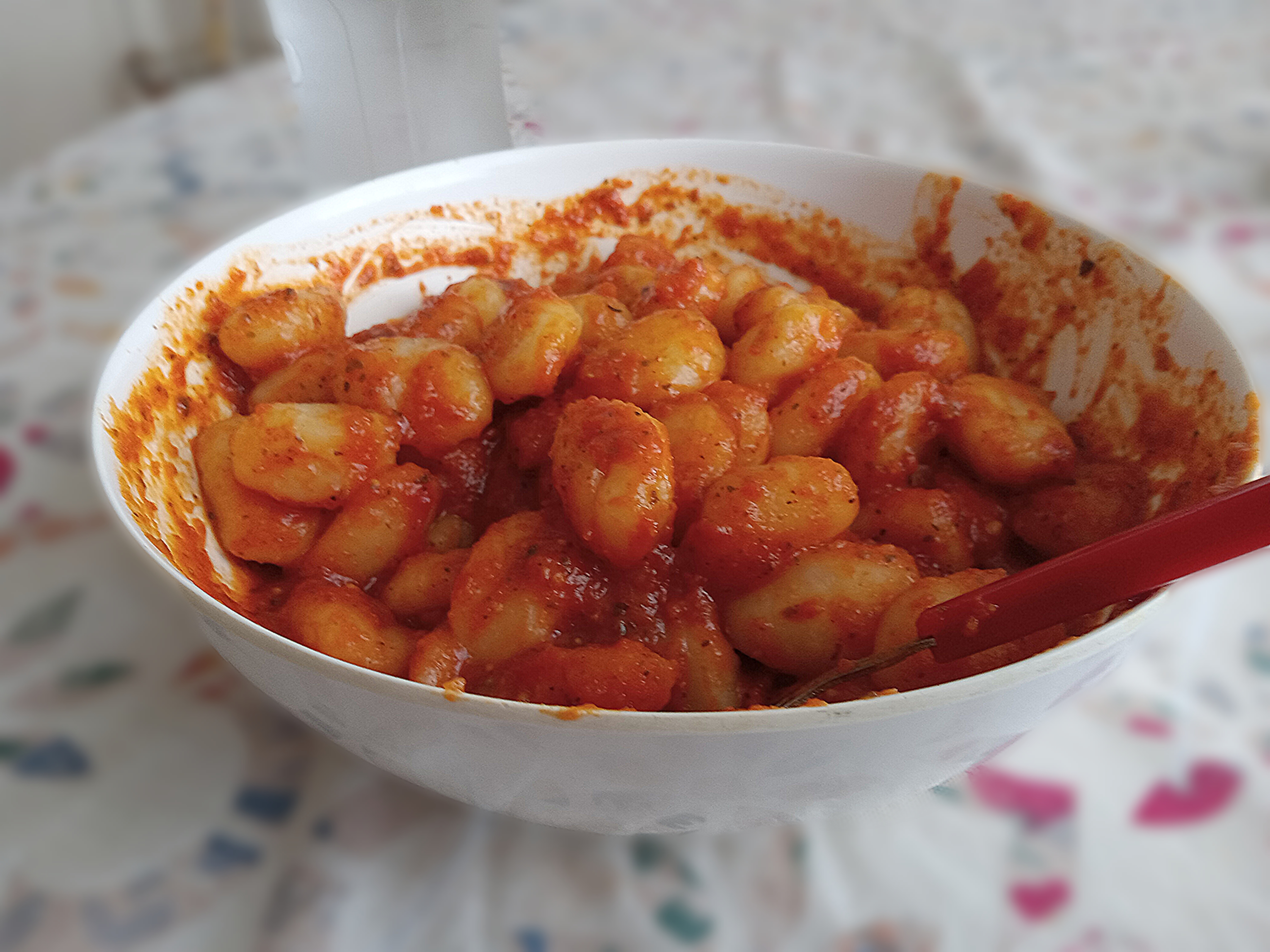
Gnocchi in slowly simmered red sauce

The word gnocchi may be derived from the Italian word nocchio, meaning 'a knot in wood', or from nocca, meaning 'knuckle'. It has been a traditional dish since Roman times. It was introduced by the Roman legions during the expansion of the empire into the countries of the European continent. One ancient Roman recipe consists of a semolina porridge-like dough mixed with eggs; similar modern dishes include the baked gnocchi alla romana and Sardinian malloreddus, which do not contain eggs.

After the potato was introduced to Europe, it was incorporated into gnocchi recipes in the late 19th century, as fees for milling wheat became too expensive for small landowners in central and northern Italy, encouraging the use of alternatives to flour when feasible. Potato gnocchi are particularly popular in Lombardy, Abruzzo, Friuli-Venezia Giulia, Veneto, and Lazio.

== Ingredients and preparation ==
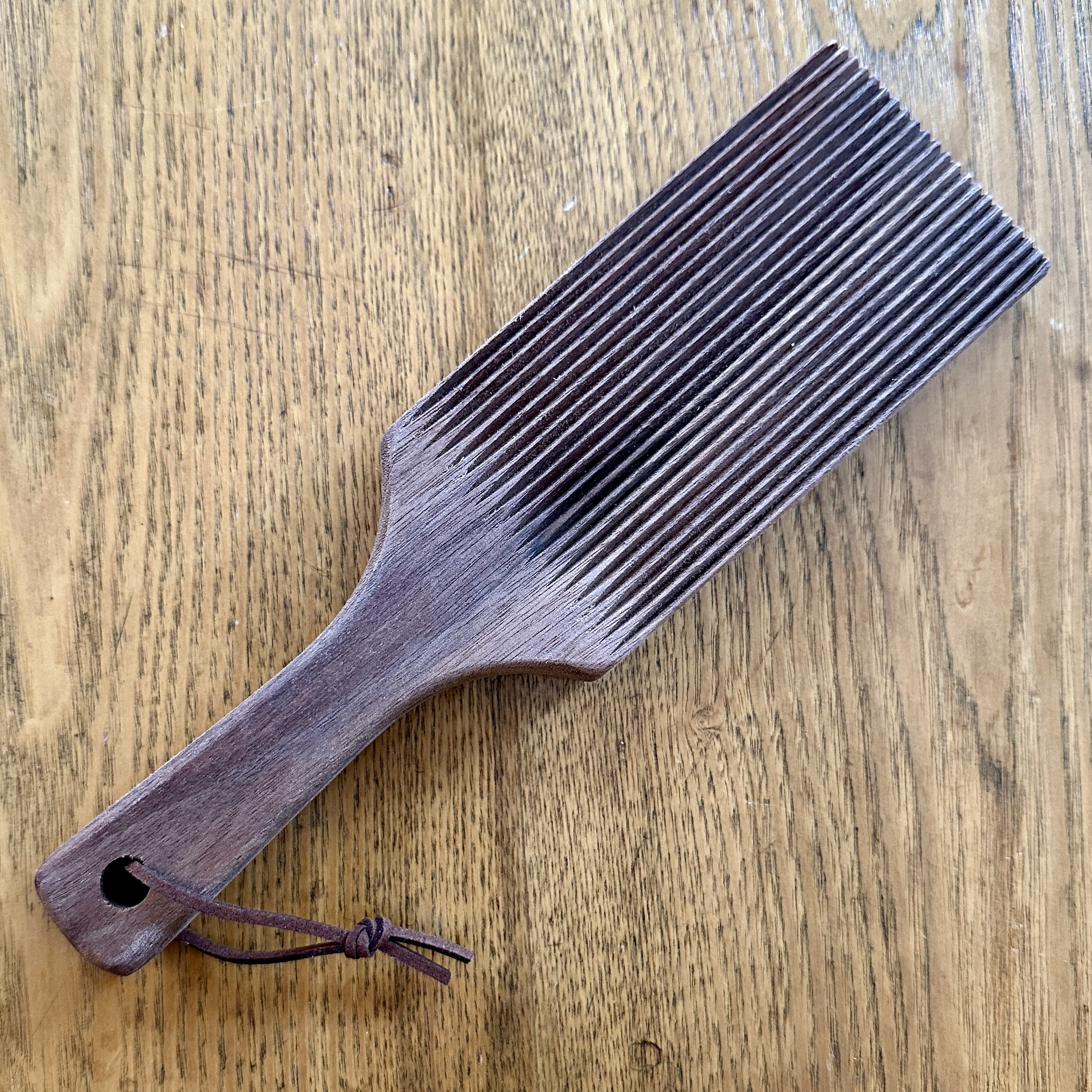
Gnocchi board or cavarola

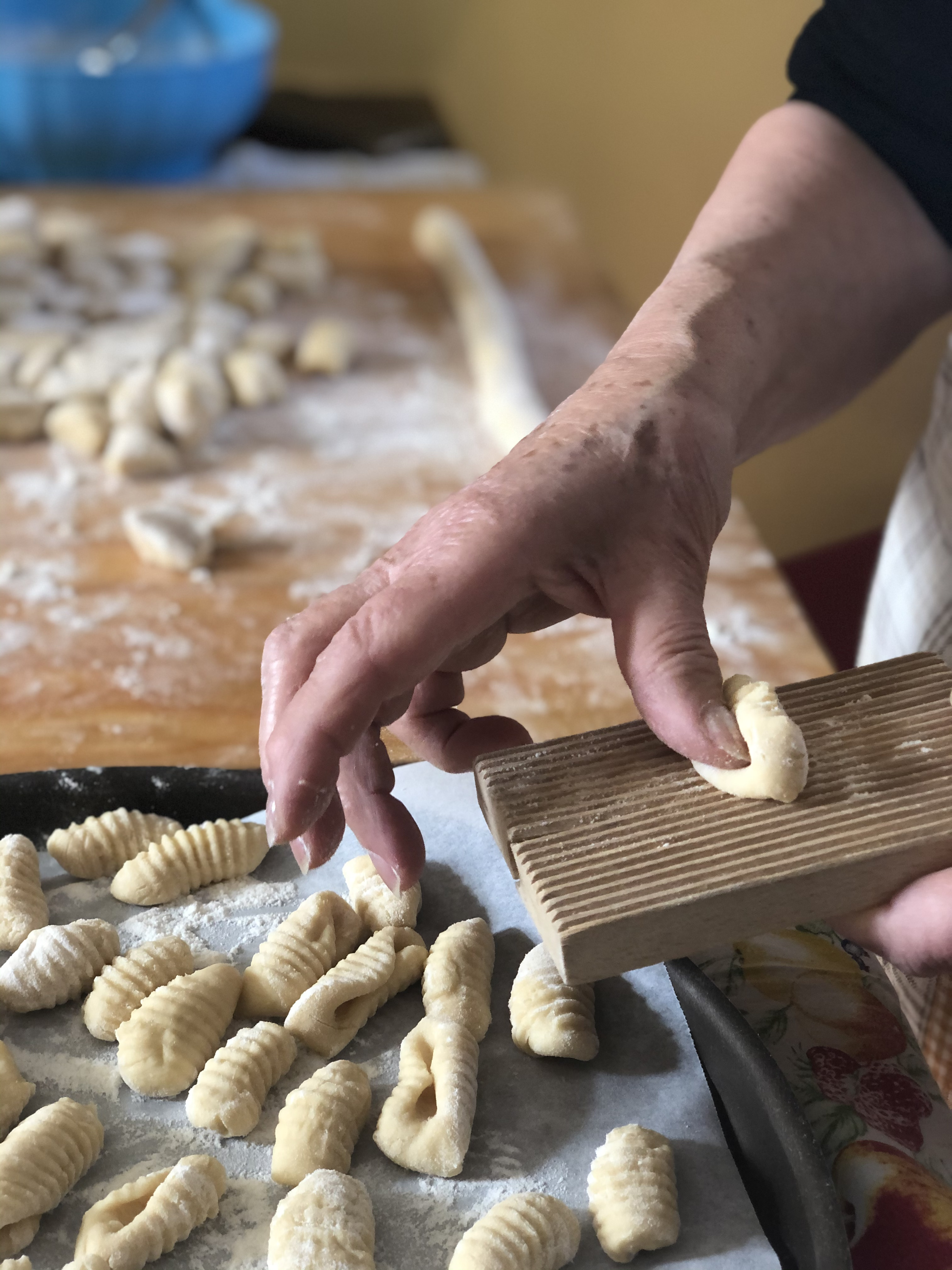
Forming gnocchi with a cavarola

Ingredients typically include wheat flour, potato, egg, and salt. Variations of the dish supplement the simple recipe with flavour additives, such as semolina flour, cheese, breadcrumbs, cornmeal or similar ingredients, and possibly including herbs, vegetables, and other ingredients.

The dough for gnocchi is often rolled out before it is cut into small pieces about the size of a wine cork or smaller. The dumplings may be pressed with a textured object, such as a fork or a cheese grater, to make ridges or cut into little lumps. Professional tools exist for this purpose, known as gnocchi or cavarola boards.

Making gnocchi
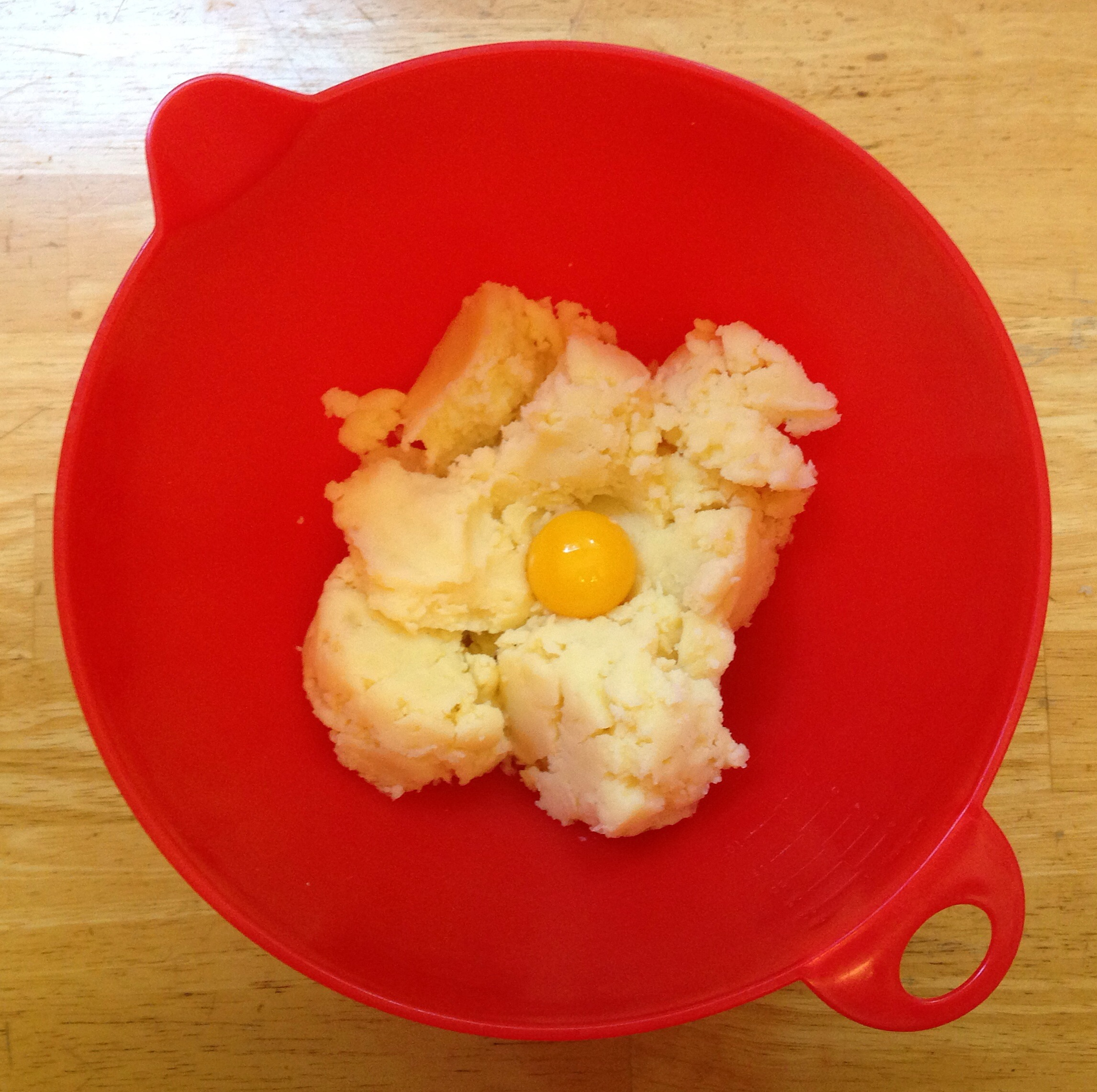
Eggs are added to mashed potatoes.

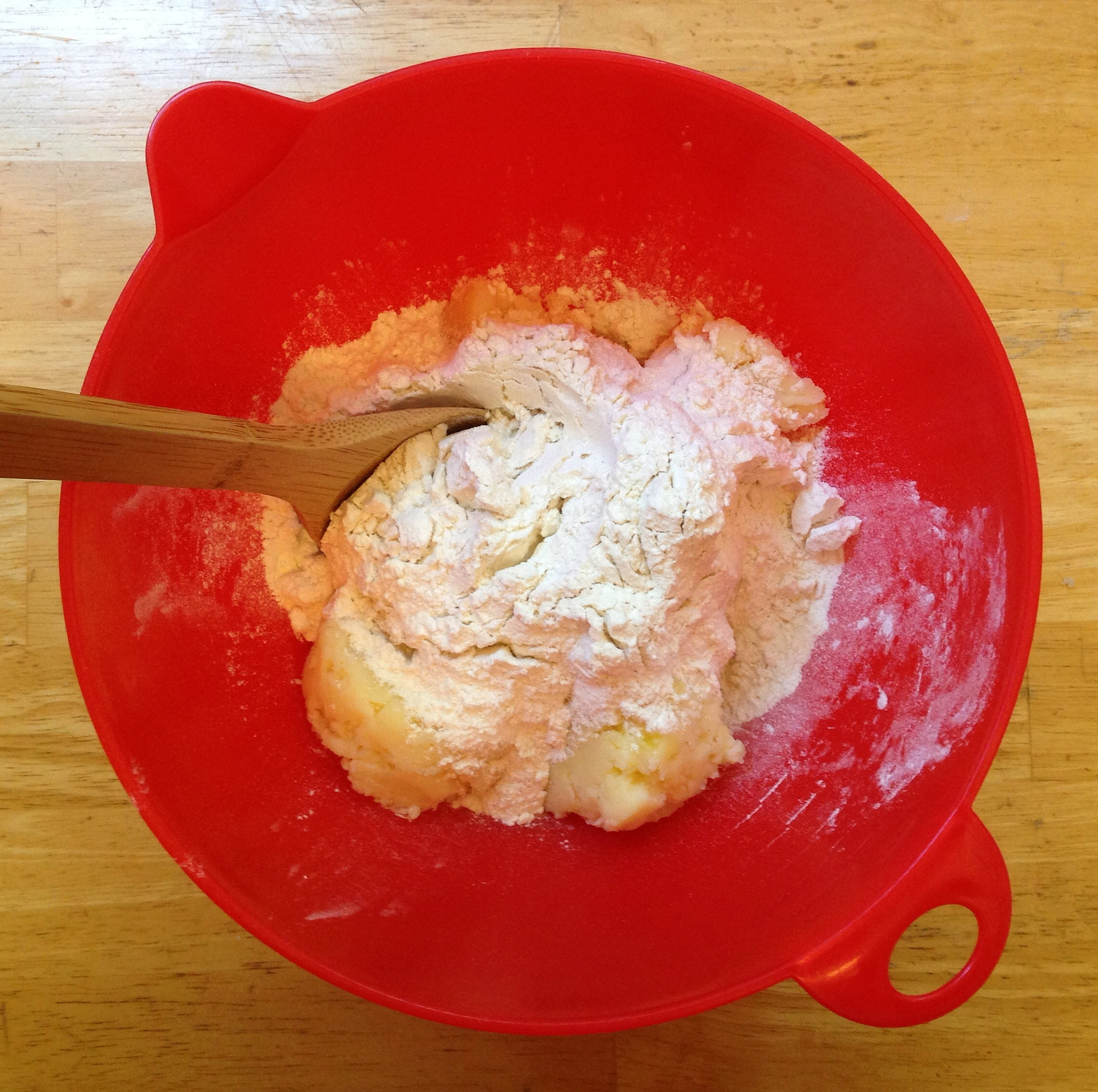
Flour is added as needed to make a workable dough.

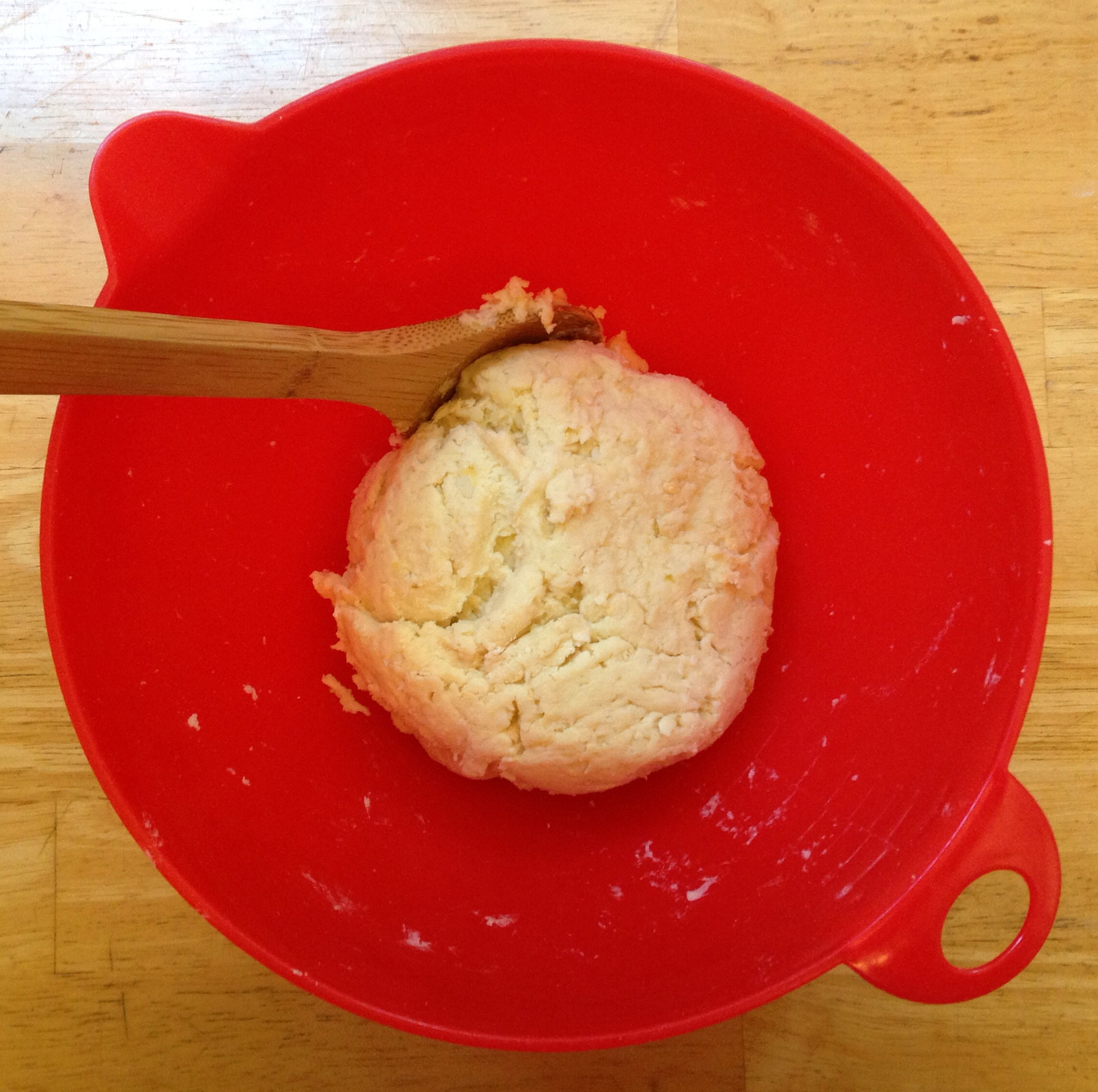
Gnocchi dough

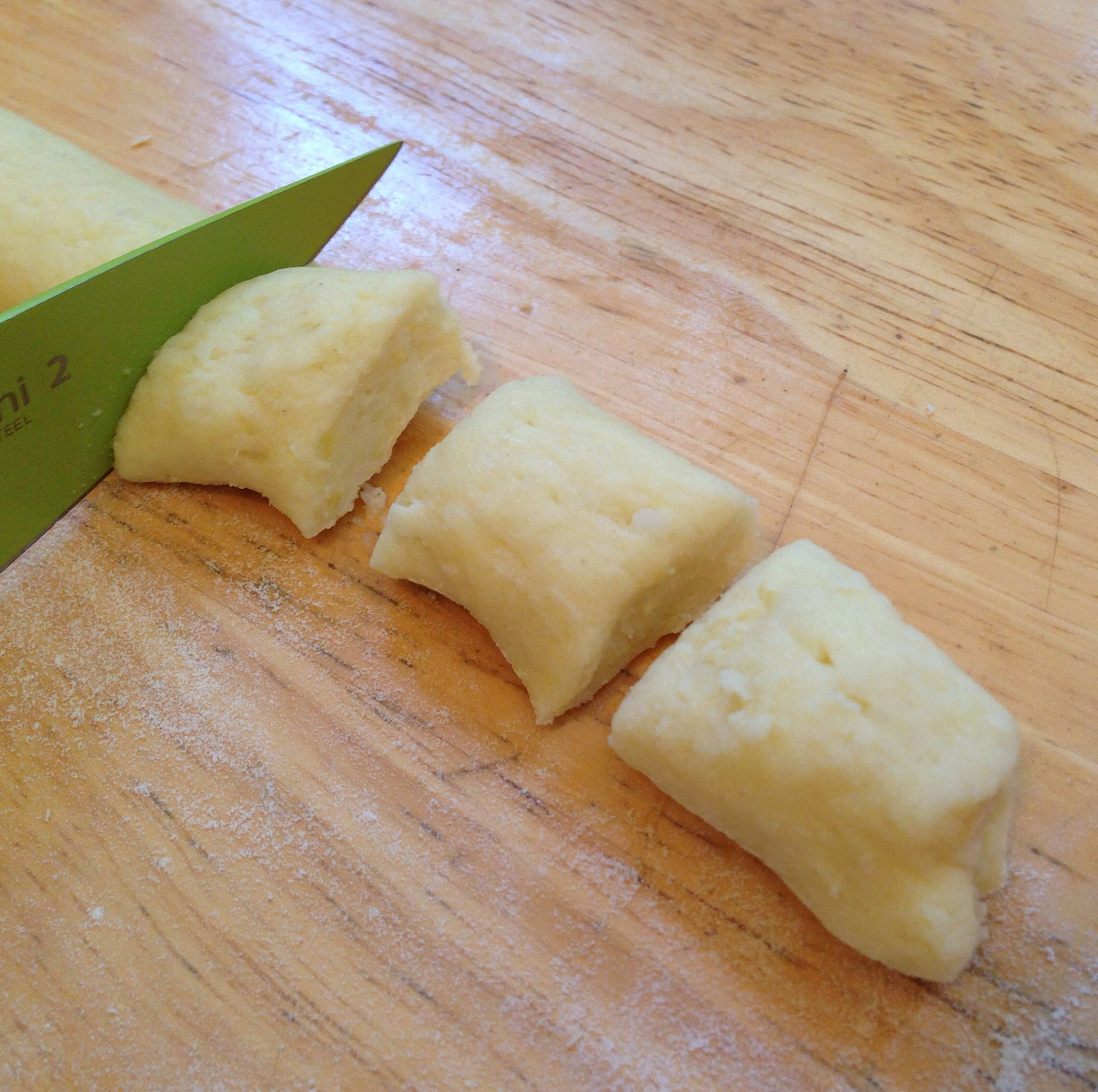
Dough is rolled into long thick round strands, which are cut into pieces.

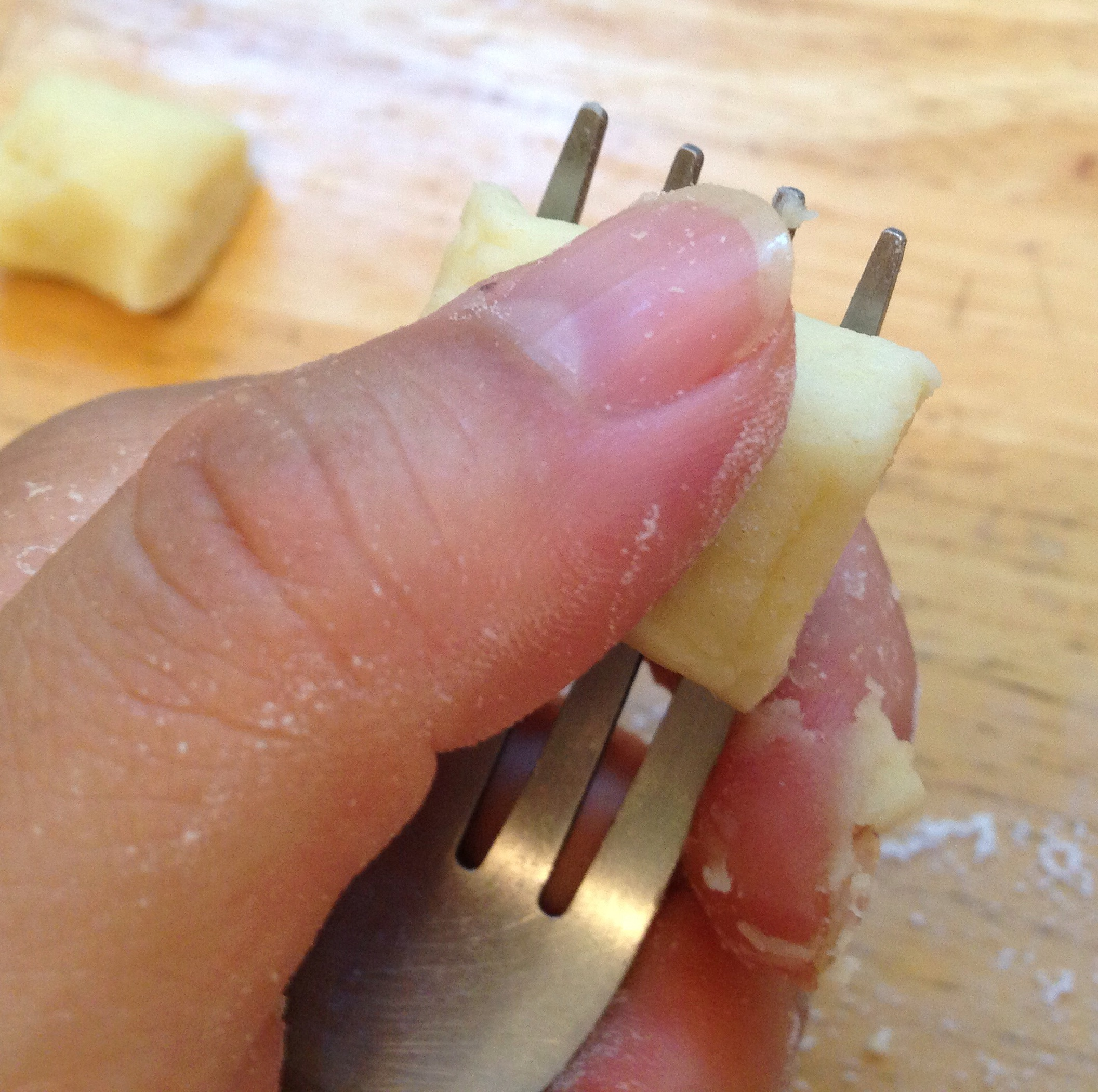
Pieces are shaped with a fork or gnocchi board.

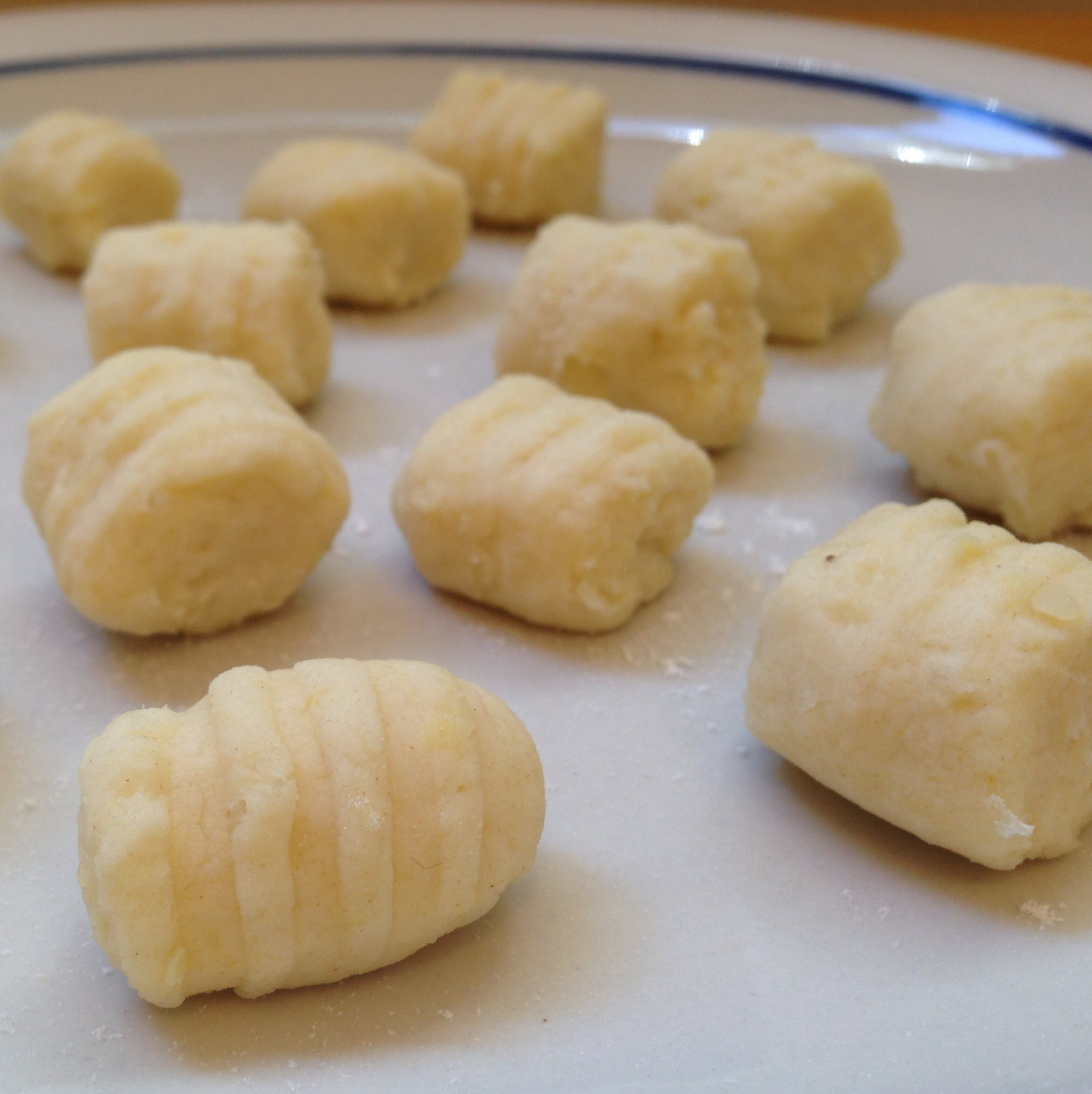
Fresh raw gnocchi

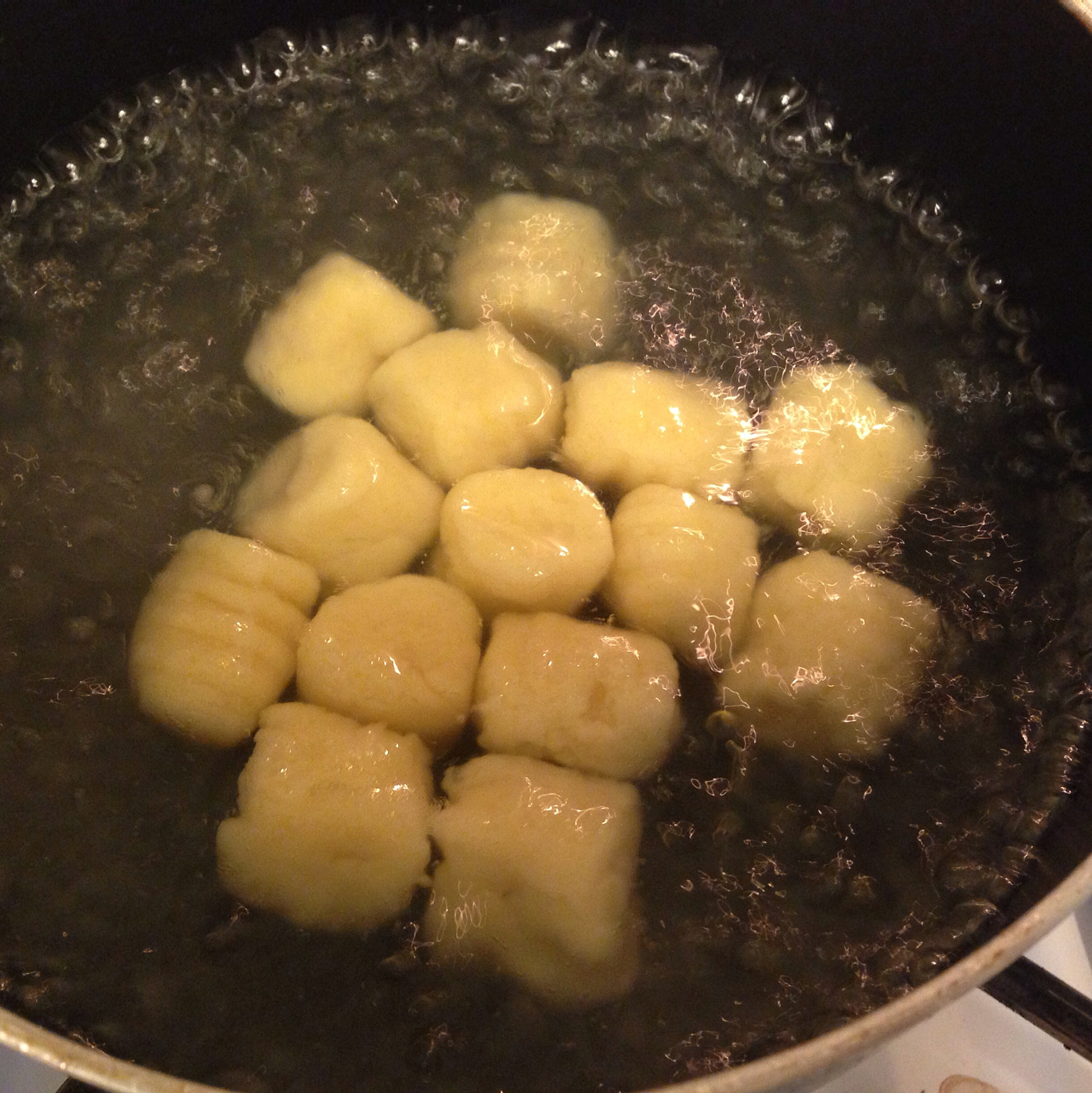
Gnocchi are boiled to cook them.

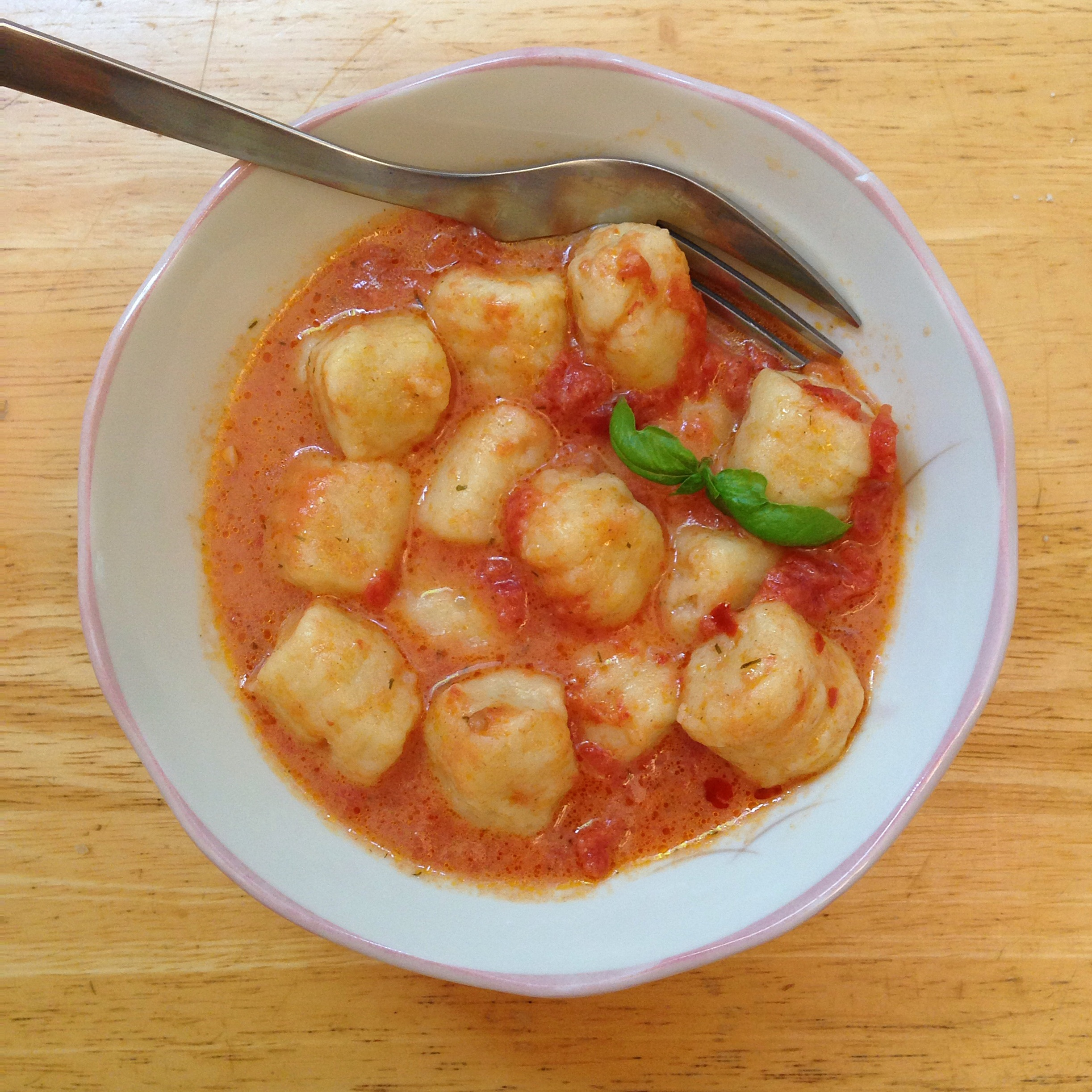
Fresh gnocchi in sauce

Gnocchi that are homemade are usually consumed the same day they are made. However, they can be cut into bite-sized dumplings, spread evenly on a baking sheet, frozen, then packaged in an air-tight bag and back into the freezer for later consumption. This method can allow the gnocchi to last up to two months in the freezer.

Commercial gnocchi are often sold under modified atmospheric packaging and may achieve a shelf life of two weeks or more under refrigeration. Some are sold in vacuum packaging that is shelf-stable, only needing refrigeration once it is opened.

== Varieties ==
=== Italy ===
Lombard and Tuscan malfatti (lit. 'poorly made') are made with ricotta, flour, and spinach, as well as the addition of various other herbs if required. Tuscan gnudi distinctively contains less flour; but some varieties are flour-based, such as the Campanian strangulaprievete, the Apulian cavatelli, the Sardinian malloreddus, and so on. Certain kinds are made of cooked polenta or semolina, which is spread out to dry, layered with cheese and butter, and baked.

=== Outside Italy ===
==== Croatia ====
Gnocchi are very popular and often served as a dish in coastal Croatia, typically being served as a first course or a side dish with dalmatinska pašticada. The Croatian name for gnocchi is njoki.

==== France ====
In France, gnocchis à la parisienne is a hot dish of dumplings made of choux pastry served with béchamel sauce.

A specialty of Nice, gnocchi or gnoques de tantifla a la nissarda are made with potatoes, wheat flour, and eggs. Another version including blette (Swiss chard) is called merda dé can (lit. 'dog shit').

In Provence, potato gnocchi can be made in a longer shape called longettes.

==== South America ====
Due to the significant number of Italian immigrants who arrived in Argentina, Paraguay, and Uruguay, gnocchi, ñoqui (Spanish: [ˈɲoki]) or nhoque (Portuguese: [ˈɲɔki]) is a popular dish, even in areas with few Italian immigrants. In Uruguay, Paraguay, and Argentina, there is a tradition of eating gnocchi on the 29th of each month, with some people putting money beneath their plates to bring prosperity. Indeed, in Argentina and Uruguay ñoqui is slang for a bogus employee (according to corrupt accountancy practices or, in the public sector, the distribution of political patronage), who only turns up at the end of the month to receive their salary.

== Gallery ==
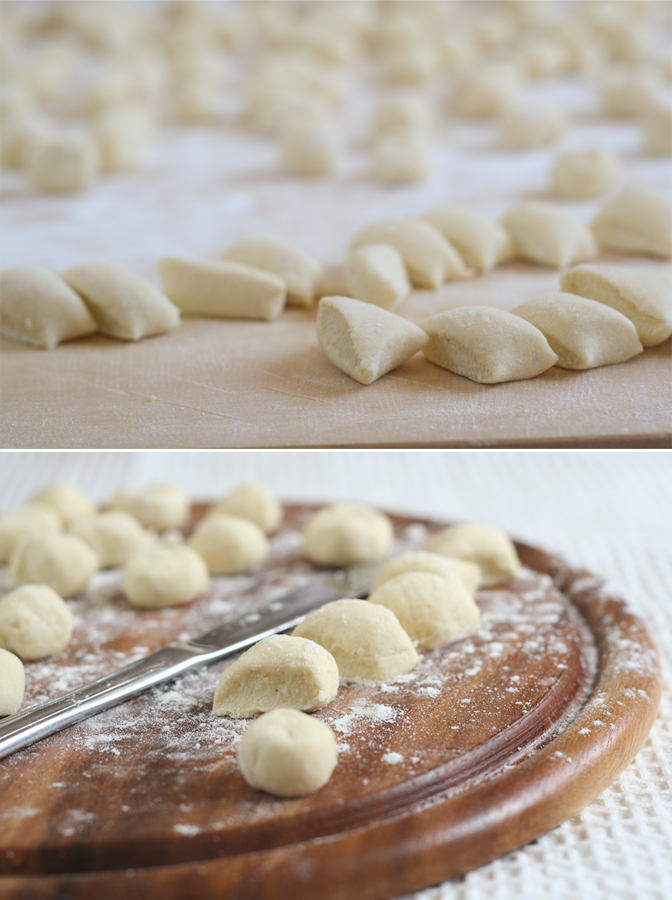
Gnocchi being prepared

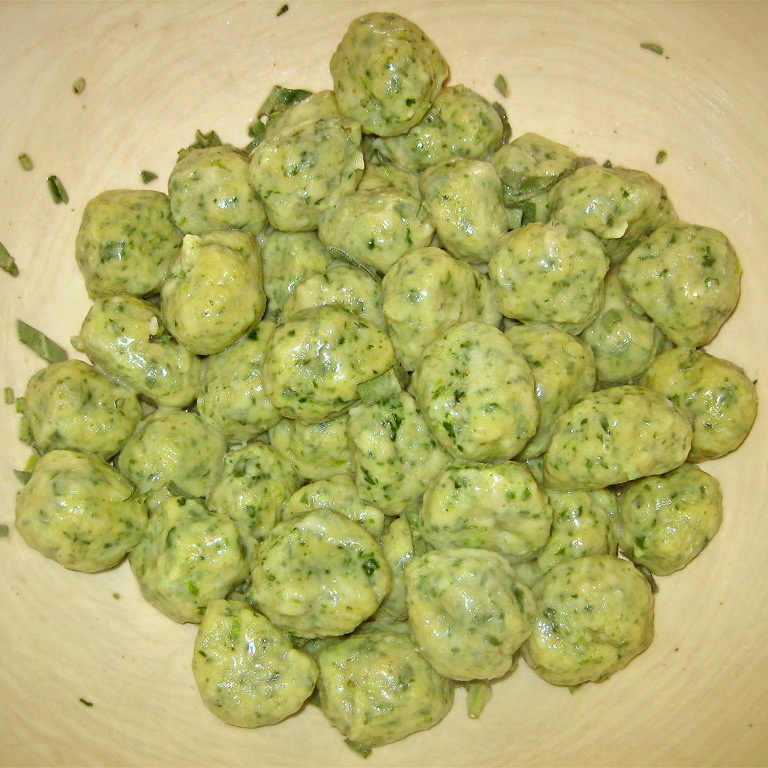
Spinach gnocchi with butter and sage

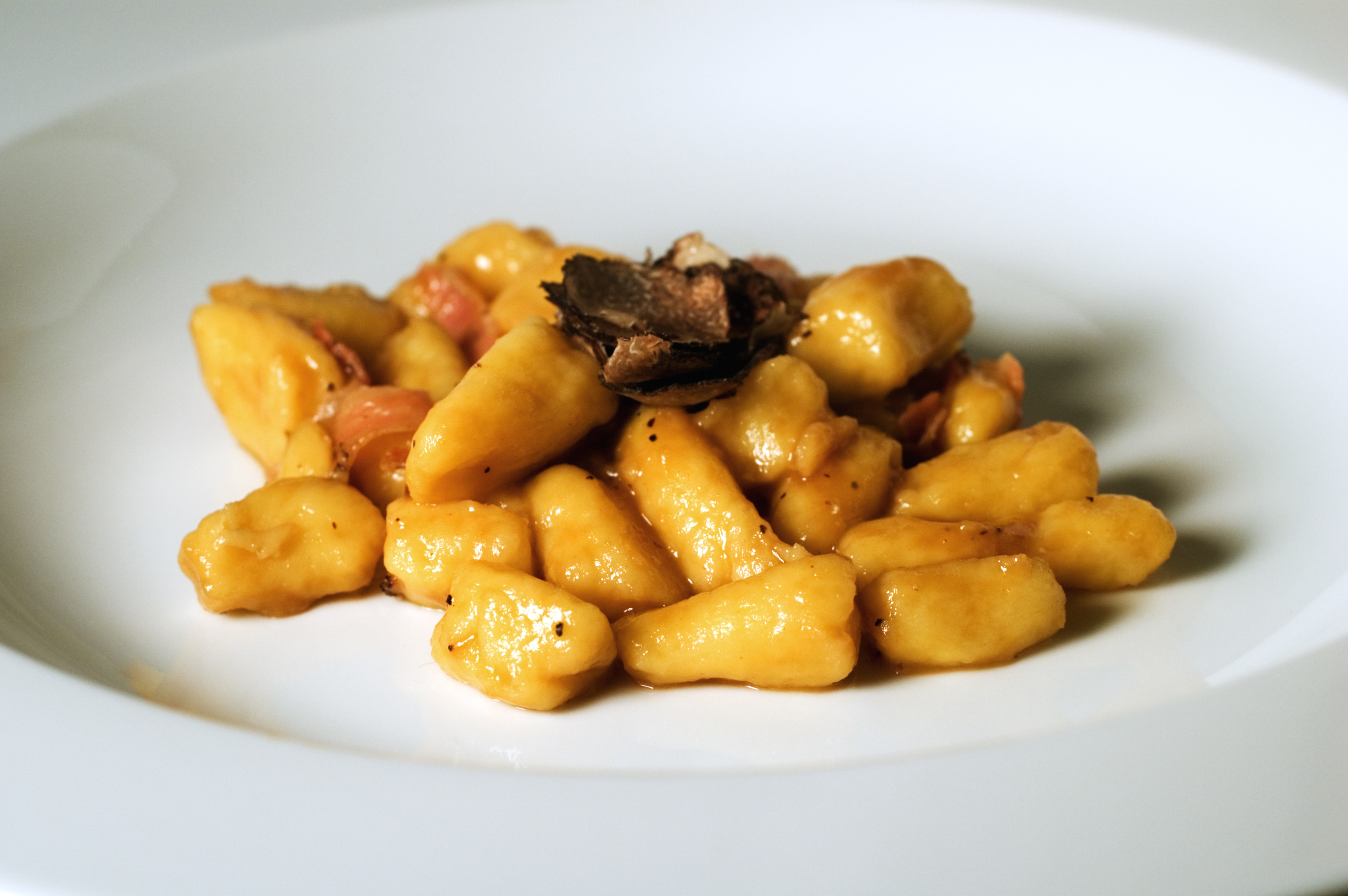
Gnocchi with truffle

== See also ==
- List of pasta
- List of pasta dishes
- List of dumplings
- Gnocchi alla romana
