= Network adequacy =

Network adequacy in healthcare in the United States is having sufficient providers within a health plan network to ensure reasonable and timely access to care.

Health insurance plans may include ghost providers to falsely maintain compliance. There are no federal standards, though several states, including California, have passed legislation to ensure minimum network adequacy.
