= Ñoqui =

Government worker who does no actual work

In Argentina and Uruguay, a ñoqui (English: gnocchi) is a person who is legally registered as a worker, usually for the government, and receives a monthly wage, but who performs little or no work. Such individuals are called ñoquis because many Argentines and Uruguayans traditionally eat ñoquis (gnocchi) on the 29th day of every month, around the time when people receive their monthly paychecks. A banknote is traditionally placed beneath the plate for good luck, signifying abundance.

People may hold ñoqui positions for several reasons. Some are the recipients of political favors and/or nepotism, while others work to promote partisan agendas instead of performing their nominal duties. Still others are disabled or continue to receive paychecks by mistake, such as the dead, retired, or those who have moved on to other positions.

A 2015 study by KPMG estimated that 5 to 7 percent of Argentine public sector employees were ñoquis, which would be more than 200,000 individuals each receiving an average monthly salary of 8,000 pesos.

== History ==
Upon taking office as chief of government of Buenos Aires in 2007, Mauricio Macri fired 2,400 city employees whom he claimed were ñoquis. This action led to strikes and conflict with the city's unions.

In 2015, Sergio Massa pledged to "sweep away the ñoquis of La Cámpora" during his campaign against Cristina Fernández de Kirchner, although in 2019 he joined an electoral front aligned with Kirchnerism.

Rolando Figueroa, as part of a 2025 campaign against government waste, publicly accused an unnamed son of a former Governor of Neuquén Province of being a ñoqui who had not showed up to work for 18 years but who had submitted paperwork to officially retire.

== See also ==
- Sinecure
- No-show job
