= UniCare =

American health insurance company

- Industry: Health insurance
- Headquarters: Indianapolis, Indiana, United States
- Parent: Elevance Health
- Website: www.unicare.com

UniCare is an American health insurance company owned by Elevance Health.

== Information ==
The company announced on October 28, 2021, that it was exiting the Illinois and Texas markets.

Records of the Texas Department of Insurance list UniCare Life & Health Insurance Company with a head office in Indianapolis, Indiana but a mailing address in Chicago, Illinois.

== Health insurance ==
The company offers health insurance services through online health insurance brokers, such as HealthPlanOne and InsureMe.
