= Gnocchi alla romana =

Italian dish

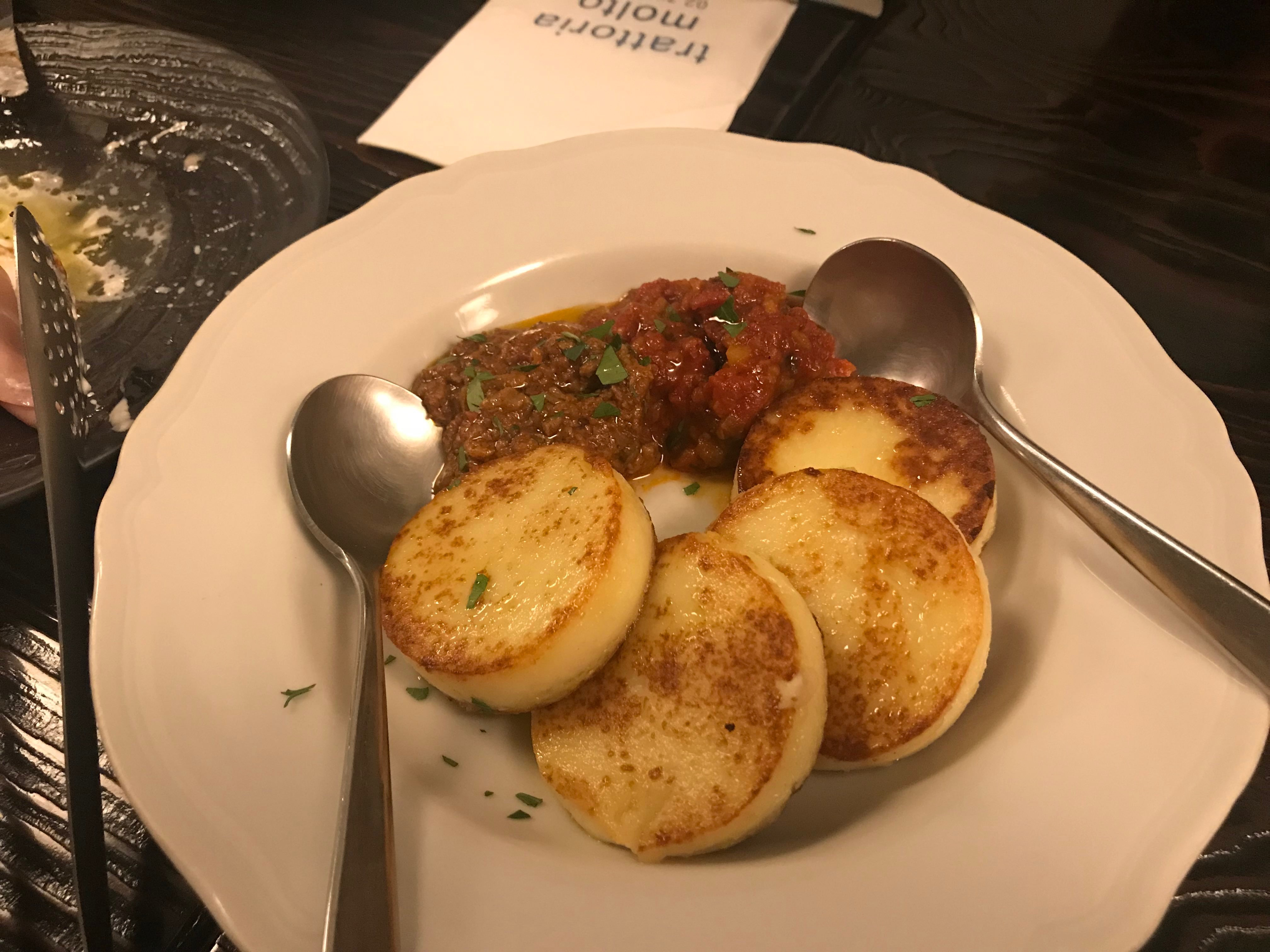
- Course: Primo (Italian course)
- Place of origin: Italy
- Region or state: Lazio

Gnocchi alla romana is a typical dish of Roman cuisine.

They are prepared with gnocchi made of semolina, whole milk, butter, and Parmesan cheese, seasoned with salt and black pepper.

The dish is also present in the Piedmontese culinary tradition due to the presence of butter, which is a common ingredient in northern Italy.

== See also ==
Media related to Gnocchi alla romana at Wikimedia Commons

- List of pasta
- List of pasta dishes
- List of dumplings
- Gnocchi
