= Carelon Health =

Integrated health plan and care delivery system

Carelon Health, (formerly CareMore) a subsidiary of Elevance Health through its Carelon brand, is an integrated health plan and care delivery system for Medicare and Medicaid patients. The company was founded in 1992 as CareMore by Sheldon Zinberg and Johnn Edelston, President of HealthPro Associates through the merger of Community IPA managed by HealthPro Associates and Internal Medicine Specialists Medical Group, managed by Dr. Zinberg. It was based on the Sac-Sierra Medical Clinic structure of a "clinic without walls". CareMore was structured as a partnership of corporations with a wrap-around IPA. The ownership included 33 mostly independent primary care physicians as a small Southern California regional medical partnership. the company was rebranded as Carelon Health in 2024. Today, Carelon Health serves 125,000 patients across 9 states with annual revenues of $1.2B.

The company has developed a care model designed to target high-risk, chronically ill patients through focused care coordination, patient education, and proactive disease management. This model has resulted in costs 18% below industry average, while tangibly increasing quality: hospital admissions are 42% below national average, average length of stay is 32% below traditional Medicare Fee-For-Service (FFS), and diabetic amputation rates are 67% below traditional FFS. These results have led some health policy experts to point to CareMore as one of the most innovative models to reform Medicare. However, CareMore has also been criticized as a one-off success story that will not be able to scale beyond its core markets.

== History ==
CareMore Health System was founded by Dr. Sheldon Zinberg and John Edelston in 1992 in an effort to reorganize the healthcare delivery system to proactively integrate and improve the quality of care and have greater penetration in the growing membership of HMOs. The company's website highlights that the name "CareMore" was selected as a representation of its philosophy and mission-driven nature. By 1993, the group had grown to include 28 offices in the greater Los Angeles area. CareMore restructured in 1997 as a privately managed Medicare health plan, shifting its focus to primarily elderly, high risk patients. In 2003, it formalized this focus, becoming a Medicare Advantage (MA) plan. As an MA plan, CareMore embraced full capitation reimbursement, aligning its financial incentives with favorable patient outcomes.

In 2006, JP Morgan's CCMP Capital and Crystal Cove Partners acquired CareMore, refining and expanding the plan's model of care. CareMore introduced a number of Special Needs Plans in 2007 that were aimed at high-cost, high-need patients with chronic diseases. By 2010, CareMore had expanded to Northern California, Arizona, and Nevada. Serving over 50,000 patients, CareMore was acquired by WellPoint – now Anthem – in 2011 for $800 million. Between 2011 and 2016, CareMore diversified its care delivery services by providing care to Medicaid and Dual-Eligible patients in CA, NV, TN, OH, and IA.

=== Carelon Health Neighborhood Care Center ===
Carelon Health operates neighborhood-based care centers that act as supplementary extensions of the patient's primary care physician offices. The goal of the Care Center is to provide a one-stop shop for care services, reducing travel time, likelihood of missing an appointment and duplication of efforts. Each Center provides a range of primary care medical services as well as podiatry, mental health services, diabetes management, wound management, hypertension management programs, and prevention services. In 2016, CareMore announced a partnership with the ride-sharing application Lyft to provide free rides for patients to the Care Center and further increase accessibility.

=== Chronic Care Management Programs ===
Carelon Health offers its patients a high-touch, proactive approach to chronic disease management designed to minimize the probability of an acute episode of care. After a comprehensive medical evaluation, patients with chronic conditions are enrolled in one of Carelon Health's 14 different disease management programs. Once in a program, patients are seen periodically in a Carelon Health's Care Center by Carelon Health's interdisciplinary care team. The team monitors disease-specific metrics to determine whether a patient requires more intensive management. Roughly 30% of Carelon Health's Medicare Advantage patients are engaged in a disease management program. The company has seen particularly strong outcomes in its Chronic Obstructive Pulmonary Disease, Congestive Heart Failure, End Stage Renal Disease and Diabetes programs.

== Outcomes ==
CareMore's outcomes led Arnold Milstein and Elizabeth Gilbertson to dub CareMore a "medical home run" in their 2009 Health Affairs article.

CareMore's average length of stay is 3.7 days compared to a FFS average of 5.2 days. Bed days per 1000 is 48% lower, diabetic amputation rate is 67% lower, and end-state renal disease hospital admissions are 50% lower.

From a cost perspective, CareMore has reported an 18% reduction versus the industry average. An article in the American Journal of Managed Care reported cost reductions for intermediate risk patients of $500 (a 33% drop) and reductions for highest risk patients of $1,250 (a 35% drop).

CareMore claims that 97% of its members are either very satisfied or somewhat satisfied with their CareMore health plan. They also self-report that more than 80% have recommended the company to a friend.

== Expansion ==
=== Medicaid delivery ===
In 2013, CareMore expanded into the Medicaid managed care space by partnering with another Anthem subsidiary, Amerigroup, to provide coverage in Tennessee, Iowa, and Ohio. Unlike its traditional model, in the Medicaid space CareMore serves only as the patient care delivery organization, while Amerigroup provides the insurance layer. Though significant gains in clinical outcomes remain to be seen, CareMore Health System and Amerigroup believe the partnership has the capability to transform Medicaid patient care across the United States.

=== Dementia care ===
In 2012 CareMore launched a Brain Health pilot geared towards providing support to patients with dementia, with funding from the Center for Medicare and Medicaid Innovation (CMMI). The program initially consisted of 42 patients with dementia and resulted in a decrease in patients' ER utilization and fall incidence. Critics of the program suggest the pilot's findings are not scalable over large patient bases, though CareMore is currently expanding the program through its multiple markets. Supporters of the program highlight its focus on support for the caregiver, a role that is often neglected and subject to caregiver stress.

=== Patient transportation ===
In 2016, CareMore began a partnership with ride service company Lyft. A 1-month pilot program in which 500 patients were provided transportation to a CareMore Care Center saw average wait times of 8 minutes. Both companies believe the partnership can significantly improve patient access to healthcare services.

=== CareMore-Emory partnership ===
In 2015, CareMore began a partnership with Emory Health System in which the two entities will work together to redesign Emory's clinical delivery infrastructure and coordination to ready the system for value-based care delivery. The partnership features Emory's adoption of the Extensivist physician role and the outpatient clinic focused on managing chronic disease. The partnership – among the first of its kind – has shown some notable improvements in care quality, with a 30-day hospital readmission rate of 8.9% for the cohort of patients cared for in the experimental model. While CareMore Health System and Emory Health System have remained optimistic about their partnership and the opportunities for other Academic medical centers to follow suit, some experts warn that the long-term results may not be as favorable as promised.
