= Sinecure =

Office or job with a salary but which requires little to no actual responsibility

A sinecure (/ˈsɪnɪkjʊər/ or /ˈsaɪnɪkjʊər/; from the Latin sine, 'without', and cura, 'care') is a position with a salary or otherwise generating income that requires or involves little or no responsibility, labour, or active service. The term originated in the medieval church, where it signified a post without any responsibility for the "cure [care] of souls", the regular liturgical and pastoral functions of a cleric, but came to be applied to any post, secular or ecclesiastical, that involved little or no actual work. Sinecures have historically provided a potent tool for governments or monarchs to distribute patronage, while recipients are able to store up titles and easy salaries.

A sinecure can also be given to an individual whose primary job is in another office, but requires a sinecure title to perform that job. For example, the Government House Leader in Canada is often given a sinecure ministry position so that they may become a member of the Cabinet. Similar examples are the Lord Keeper of the Privy Seal and the Chancellor of the Duchy of Lancaster, whose holders are ex officio members of the Privy Council and may therefore be admitted to the Cabinet of the United Kingdom (which is formally the executive committee of the Privy Council). The minister without portfolio is a frequent example of this sinecure, often employed to give cabinet-level positions to enough members of all partners in a coalition government. Other sinecures operate as legal fictions, such as the British office of Crown Steward and Bailiff of the Chiltern Hundreds, used as a legal excuse for resigning from Parliament.

== History ==
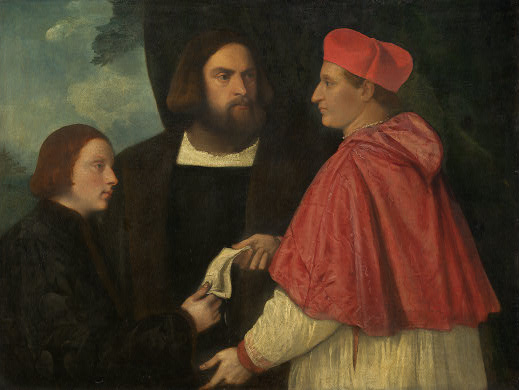
Girolamo and cardinal Marco Cornaro investing Marco, abbot of Carrara, with his benefice. Titian, c. 1520

Sinecure, properly a term of ecclesiastical law for a benefice without the cure of souls, arose in the English Church when the rector had no cure of souls nor resided in the parish, the work of the incumbent being performed by a vicar. Such sinecure rectories were expressly granted by the patron. They were abolished by Parliament under the Ecclesiastical Commissioners Act 1840.

Other ecclesiastical sinecures were certain cathedral dignities to which no spiritual functions attached or incumbencies where by reason of depopulation and the like, the parishioners disappeared or the parish church was allowed to decay. Such cases eventually ceased to exist.

The term is also used of any office or place to which salary, emoluments, or dignity, but no duties, are attached. The British civil service and the royal household, for example, were loaded with innumerable offices which, by lapse of time, had become sinecures and were only kept as the reward of political services or to secure voting power in Parliament. They were prevalent in the 18th century, but were gradually abolished by statutes during that and the following centuries.

== Current usage ==
Below is a list of extant sinecures by country.

=== United Kingdom ===
==== Positions associated with membership of the Privy Council/Cabinet ====
- Lord President of the Council
- Lord Keeper of the Privy Seal
- First Secretary of State
- Chancellor of the Duchy of Lancaster
- Paymaster General

==== Positions used to effect resignation from the House of Commons ====
- Crown Steward and Bailiff of the Chiltern Hundreds
- Crown Steward and Bailiff of the Manor of Northstead

==== Positions associated with the Whips' Office ====
- Parliamentary Secretary to the Treasury – held by the Chief Whip in the House of Commons
- Treasurer of the Household – held by the Deputy Chief Whip in the Commons
- Comptroller of the Household – held by a senior Commons Whip
- Vice-Chamberlain of the Household – held by a senior Commons Whip
- Lords of the Treasury – held by the several junior Commons Whips
- Captain of the Honourable Corps of Gentlemen-at-Arms – held by the Chief Whip in the House of Lords
- Captain of the Yeomen of the Guard – held by the Deputy Chief Whip in the Lords
- Lords in Waiting – held by the several junior Lords Whips

==== Ceremonial and honorary positions ====
- Lord Clerk Register
- Lord Steward of the Household
- Master of the Horse
- Lord Warden of the Cinque Ports
- Constable of the Tower of London
- Constable and Governor of Windsor Castle

=== Canada ===
- Deputy Prime Minister of Canada
- President of the Privy Council (given to the Minister of Intergovernmental Affairs)

=== Australia ===
- Vice-President of the Executive Council

=== Russia ===
- Office of Inspectors General

== See also ==
- Board member
- Emeritus, academia
- Minister without portfolio
- No-show job – the same but illegal
- Ñoqui
- Quango
- Safe seat
- Featherbedding
- Ghost soldiers
- nonjob

Christian churches:

- Abbé
- Benefice
- Simony
- Titular bishop

== Bibliography ==
- Lord Mackay of Clashfern (ed.) (2002) Halsbury's Laws of England, 4th ed. Vol.14, "Ecclesiastical Law", (see also current updates)
- Smith, W. (1880). A Dictionary of Christian Antiquities: Being a Continuation of the 'Dictionary of the Bible'. J.B. Burr Pub. Co. pp. Sinecure.
- Definition on Enciclopedia Treccani (in Italian)
- Maurilio Guasco, Storia del clero, Bari:Laterza (1997), p. 20 (in Italian)
