= Gnudi =

Type of pasta

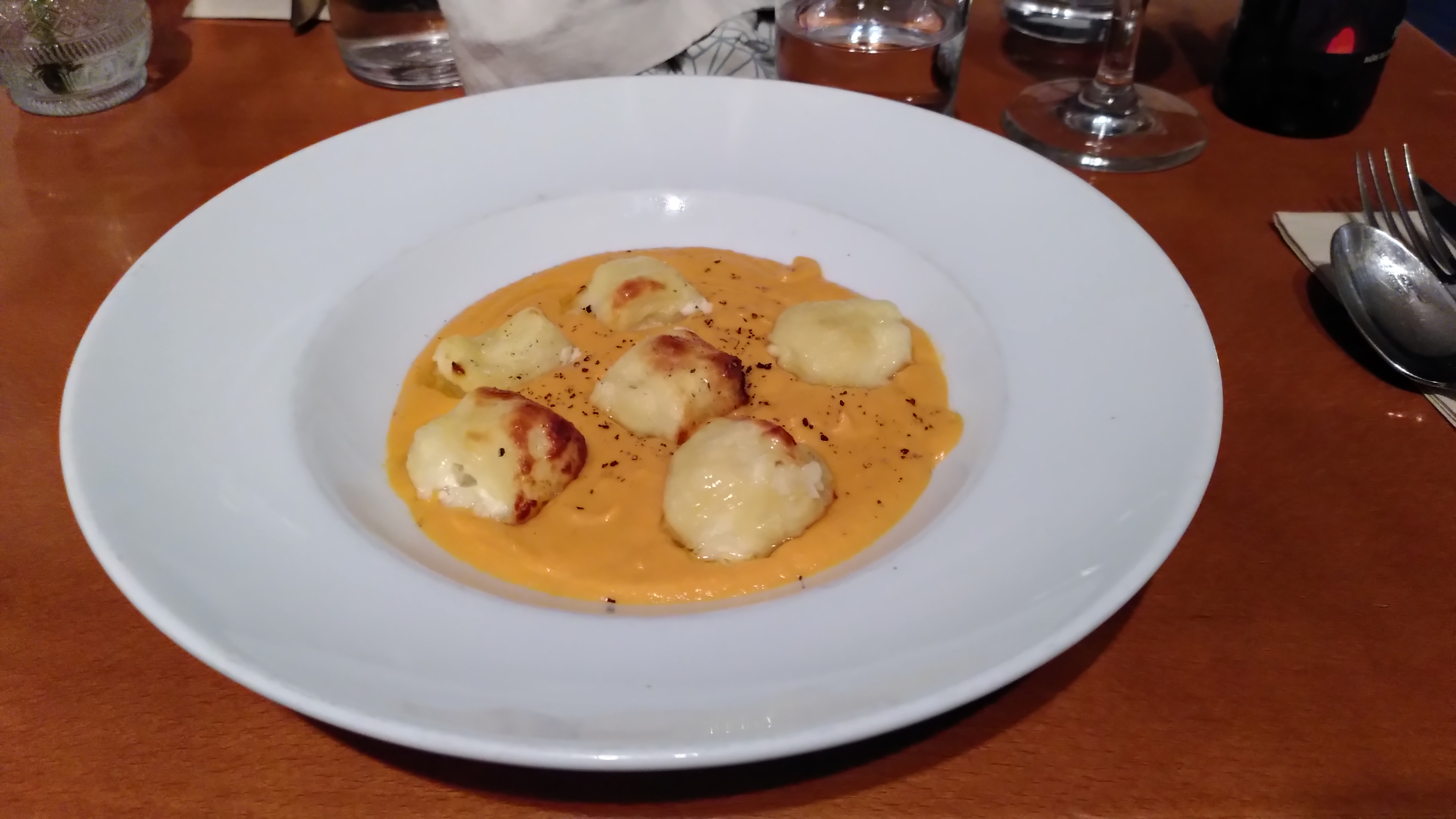
- Savory gnudi
- Alternative names: Malfatti
- Type: Dumpling
- Place of origin: Italy
- Region or state: Tuscany
- Main ingredients: Ricotta, spinach, pecorino toscano
- Similar dishes: Gnocchi

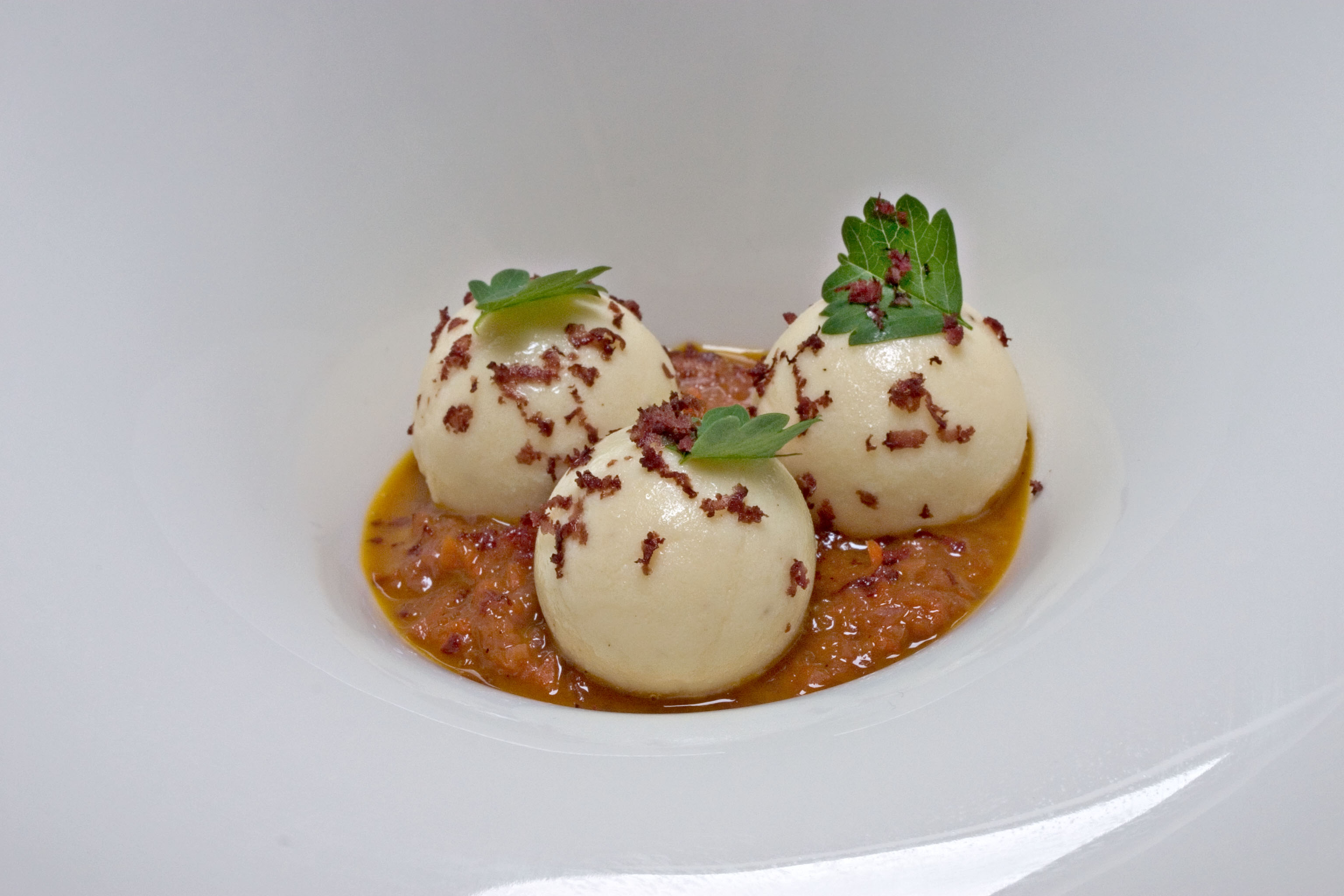
Ricotta gnudi with strawberry sauce (as a dessert)

Gnudi (Italian: [ˈɲuːdi]), also known as malfatti, are gnocchi-like dumplings made with ricotta cheese and semolina. While described as similar to gnocchi, gnocchi are generally made with potatoes, while gnudi are made with cheese. Gnudi is the Tuscan word for 'naked' (in standard Italian nudi), the idea being that these "pillowy" balls of ricotta and spinach (sometimes without spinach) are "nude ravioli", consisting of just the filling without the pasta shell.

In Tuscany, it is understood that tradition dictates the dumplings are served with butter and sage, sprinkled with Parmesan or pecorino toscano cheese.

== See also ==
- List of pasta
- List of pasta dishes
- List of dumplings
