= HealthPlanOne =

- Trade name: HealthPlanOne
- Type: Privately held company
- Industry: Insurance
- Founded: 2006
- Headquarters: Shelton, Connecticut, USA
- Key people: Bill Stapleton; Trevor Prout; Paul Stanco; Mike Stapleton; Tom Wicker
- Products: Health insurance sales and marketing
- Website: www.hpone.com

HealthPlanOne, LLC is a sales and marketing organization that operates across multiple segments of the Medicare and health insurance marketplaces. The company provides outsourced sales, marketing and contact services for national and regional health plans, operates exchanges for individual consumers and employer-based group retirees, and manages lead generation in the Medicare industry. The company operates seven contact centers: two in Arizona (Phoenix and Gilbert), three in Florida (Tampa, St. Petersburg and Orlando) One in Westford, MA and Shelton, CT.

== History ==
HPOne was founded in 2006 as HealthPlanOne in Southport, Connecticut, by Bill Stapleton and entered the brokerage business in 2007. In 2008, the company raised $6.5 million of venture capital to expand its brokerage and enter the Medicare market. The company moved into the internet sales arena as it began marketing exclusive Medicare leads and launched its nationwide Medicare Exchange. In 2010, they added exclusive Individual/Family Plan and Group leads to their lines of business and by 2011, HealthPlanOne became the largest provider of exclusive Medicare leads in the country. In 2012, the company launched its integrated, cloud-based sales technology platform through its "Licensed Broker Solutions Center". In that same year, HealthPlanOne expanded its call center services to a facility in Tampa, Florida. It also launched its Mobile Application in 2012. In 2013, the company entered the Member Acquisition business acting as a full service contact and sales center for national and regional health plans. In 2013, the company also became an authorized Web Broker Entity through an agreement with The Centers for Medicare and Medicaid Services (CMS). They launched their "Employer Solutions" offering targeted at Employer Groups and Brokers and expanded their call center in St. Petersburg, Florida, in 2013 as well. In July 2014, the company opened a third call center in Phoenix, Arizona, and in December 2014 closed an investment round of growth capital from Peloton Equity, naming Carlos Ferrer and Theodore Lundberg to the Board of Directors. In May 2015, Leslie V. Norwalk, Esq., J.D., former head of The Centers for Medicare and Medicaid Services (CMS) and Richard Fernandes, Director and former president of Affinion Group, also joined its board of directors. In 2015, HealthPlanOne, establishing a new corporate name as the company expanded its products and services. Its Connecticut headquarters moved from Shelton, Connecticut, to Trumbull, Connecticut. Also in 2015, HealthPlanOne launched its "Stars Solutions" program for Medicare Managed Care Plans. This modular program enables Medicare insurers to tailor Stars initiatives to address unique member and physician opportunities. In that same year, 2015, HealthPlanOne launched a next-generation multi-carrier "Exchange Solutions" for retirees. The ClearChoice Exchange offers a national preferred provider organization group plan from UnitedHealth Group#UnitedHealthcare alongside individual Medicare Advantage plans.
