= Carelon Behavioral Health =

Behavioral health company based in Boston, Massachusetts

- Company type: Subsidiary
- Industry: Behavioral Health Services
- Headquarters: Boston, Massachusetts
- Area served: United States
- Key people: Glenn MacFarlane (CEO)
- Parent: Elevance Health

Carelon Behavioral Health, formerly known as Beacon Health Options, is a behavioral health company based in Boston, Massachusetts.

On Jun. 6, 2019, Anthem, Inc. (now Elevance Health) announced that it had entered into a definitive agreement to acquire Beacon Health Options. The acquisition was completed on Mar. 2, 2020. Prior to the acquisition, Beacon Health was the largest privately held company of its kind in the United States. The company is the product of a 2014 merger between Beacon Health Strategies, LLC and ValueOptions, Inc. The company rebranded as Carelon Behavioral Health in 2023.

The company currently employs 4,700 people nationwide, serving over 40 million people.

As of 2025, Carelon Behavioral Health is the subject of two lawsuits in New York and Connecticut alleging that it operates ghost networks.

== Description ==
In recent years, Carelon company provided behavioral healthcare management to 41 Fortune 500 companies, national and regional health plans, and federal, state, and local governments. It also serves over 45 million people in the United States. As of 2017, most Carelon locations were accredited by URAC (formerly the Utilization Review Accreditation Commission). Many Beacon locations also hold National Committee for Quality Assurance (NCQA) accreditation. Carelon is led by president Glenn MacFarlane.
