= Amerigroup =

American health insurance and managed health care provider

- Trade name: Amerigroup
- Company type: Subsidiary
- Industry: Health Insurance, Managed Health Care
- Founded: 1994; 32 years ago (as AMERICAID Community Care); 1996 (as Amerigroup)
- Headquarters: Virginia Beach, Virginia
- Key people: Peter D. Haytaian (EVP, Government Business Division, Anthem, Inc.)
- Products: Publicly funded health care program management
- Number of employees: 10,000+ (2020)
- Parent: Elevance Health Inc.
- Website: www.amerigroup.com/

Amerigroup is an American health insurance and managed health care provider. Amerigroup covers 7.7 million seniors, people with disabilities, low-income families and other state and federally sponsored beneficiaries, and federal employees in 26 states, making it the nation's largest provider of health care for public programs. In July 2023, it was announced that Amerigroup's name would change to Wellpoint in six states beginning in January 2024.

== History ==
Amerigroup began as AMERICAID Community Care in 1994 and was initially aimed at the health care problems of children, mothers and pregnant women enrolled in Medicaid. Amerigroup became a publicly traded corporation in November 2001.

In 2006, Amerigroup entered the Medicare Advantage program, serving low-income people who are eligible for both Medicare and Medicaid through special needs plans.

In 2007, Amerigroup began the operation of traditional Medicare Advantage plans. Currently, Amerigroup offers health care services through three government programs that target different segments of the country's low-income population: Medicaid, the Children's Health Insurance Program (CHIP) and Medicare.

On July 9, 2012, Anthem Inc. (then known as WellPoint) entered into an agreement to acquire Amerigroup Corporation for $4.9 billion. Anthem has since re-branded to Elevance Health, Inc.

On March 1, 2020, Amerigroup told Grays Harbor Community Hospital (GHCH) and Harbor Medical Group (HMG) of their decision to terminate their relationship with the company effective June 28, 2020.

== Health care products ==
As of December 31, 2012:

Children's Health Insurance Program (CHIP)

- A managed health care product for uninsured children not eligible for Medicaid. This product is designed for the SCHIP initiative.

Seniors and People with Disabilities (S/PD)

- A managed health care product designed for Supplemental Security Income (SSI) recipients. This population consists of low-income SPD.

Temporary Assistance for Needy Families (TANF)

- A Medicaid managed health care product. This product is designed for the TANF population that consists primarily of low-income children and their mothers

FamilyCare

- A managed health care product focused on uninsured adults and parents of CHIP or Medicaid-eligible children.

Medicare Advantage

- Medicare health plans. Some are regular Medicare Advantage plans, while others focus on low-income Medicare beneficiaries—Special Needs Plans for dual eligible beneficiaries with both Medicare and Medicaid.

== National Advisory Board ==
In 2007, Amerigroup developed the National Advisory Board (NAB) to focus on meeting the needs of seniors and people with disabilities, who are a significant proportion of its clients. The NAB provides policy recommendations for improving programs and services for seniors and people with disabilities. Convened by Lex Frieden, who was instrumental in conceiving and drafting the Americans with Disabilities Act of 1990, the NAB is made up of 19 community advocates, health care experts and academics. The NAB advocated that the modernized health care infrastructure be required to meet the needs of people with disabilities and seniors.

== Corporate social responsibility ==
=== Amerigroup Foundation ===
The main goals of the Amerigroup Foundation are to foster access to care, encourage safe and healthy children and families, and promote community improvement and healthy neighborhoods. In the past year, (2013) the Foundation contributed more than $3 million to various community organizations across the United States. Since inception, the Foundation has awarded $17.3 million to community health centers, service organizations, and local programs.

=== Volunteerism ===
Amerigroup has a Community Volunteers program, created to recognize and support the contributions employees make in communities across the country and to inspire others to volunteer. All Amerigroup employees receive a paid day off each year to do volunteer work in their communities.

== Medicaid fraud ==
Former Executive Cleveland Tyson provided federal prosecutors with evidence that Amerigroup was systematically declining services to low-income pregnant women in Illinois from 2001 to 2003. Their contract with the state required that they enroll all eligible clients, but prosecutors submitted emails showing that Amerigroup had a policy of targeting healthy enrollees and specifically excluded pregnant women and others with expensive conditions.

In October 2006, a federal jury found Amerigroup liable for $48 million in damages, which was tripled by statute to $144 million. In March 2007, an additional fine of over $190 million was levied for 18,000 false claims. After appealing the judgments, Amerigroup agreed in July 2008 to settle the charges for $225 million. As a whistleblower, qui tam provisions entitled Tyson to $56 million of the settlement.
