= Ghost network =

Form of health insurance fraud

Ghost network refers to a form of healthcare insurance fraud in which a health insurance plan lists providers who cannot provide care. The listed "ghost providers" may no longer be eligible to practice, may have retired, may no longer accept new patients, may not actually part of the network, or may not exist. The inclusion of ghost providers may be intentional, to exaggerate plan availability, to encourage enrollment and falsely meet healthcare network adequacy.

Ghost networks can negatively affect the quality of service received by plan participants. The delayed care may negatively impact patients.

== United States ==
Health insurance carriers may decline to make up-to-date directories of participating providers available online, and instead mail directories to delay and decrease utilization. Network accuracy is not enforced at the federal level, but several states have passed legislation to address the issue.

Ghost networks are prevalent for mental health providers in the US.
