= Michele Christiansen =

American lawyer and judge

Michele M. Christiansen Forster

Judge of the Utah Court of Appeals
- Incumbent
- Assumed office June 2010
- Nominated by: Jon Huntsman Jr.

Personal details
- Born: 1970 (age 55–56) Utah
- Education: Lawrence University (BA); S.J. Quinney College of Law (JD)

Michele Mladejovsky Christiansen Forster (born 1970) is an American lawyer who has served as a judge of the Utah Court of Appeals.

== Early life and education ==
Forster was born in 1970 in Utah. She attended Lawrence University in Appleton, Wisconsin and earned her undergraduate degree in history, making the Dean's List for academic achievement. She also completed a senior research project in fall 1991 entitled: "Mormonism and the Search for Community in Early Nineteenth Century America" as part of a Newberry Library Seminar: Research in the Humanities program.

Forster returned to Utah to attend law school at the University of Utah College of Law. While in law school from 1992–1995, she worked as a law clerk at Parsons, Behle & Latimer, a Salt Lake City law firm, during the summers. In 1994, she served a judicial internship with Utah Court of Appeals Judge Judith Billings. She worked as a Legal Writing and Research tutor and a teaching assistant while in law school. During her second year in Law School, Forster was a staff member for the Utah Law Review and published Utah Redevelopment Amendments in 1993. She graduated with her J.D. in 1995.

== Career ==
In October 1995, Forster was admitted to the Utah State Bar. After graduating from law school, Judge Forster became the first law clerk for Judge Tena Campbell of the United States District Court for the District of Utah, just appointed to the court earlier that year.

Following her clerkship, Forster became an associate at the Salt Lake City firm of Parsons, Behle & Latimer. She focused on civil litigation, particularly involving natural resources.

In 1998, Forster became an assistant United States attorney in the United States Attorney's Office for the District of Utah. She came to that office under a new initiative, Utah Federal Immigration Prosecution Project (FIPP), created to prosecute crimes committed by illegal immigrants. She focused on prosecuting illegal aliens who had been convicted of a felony and had been deported, but who had returned to the United States and committed another felony crime. Later, Christiansen's focus at the United States Attorney's changed and she began prosecuting child exploitation, child pornography and other violent crime cases. She handled several rape cases and other child sexual abuse cases involving Native Americans on reservations.

Forster left the U.S. Attorney's Office in January 2005 when she was appointed as the executive director of the Utah Commission on Criminal and Juvenile Justice (CCJJ) by Jon Huntsman, Jr., Utah's newly elected governor. While serving in the policy advisor position, Forster was appointed chair of the Utah Sexual Violence Council. In July 2006, Forster was appointed as general counsel to Governor Huntsman. During this time, Christiansen also co-chaired the Utah Methamphetamine Joint Task Force.

=== Judicial career ===
Huntsman appointed Forster a Third Judicial District Court judge in May 2007. Her docket was about 85 percent criminal cases and 15 percent civil cases. For 18 months, she presided over a mental health court, a specialty court in which members of the defense, the prosecution and medical providers work as a team to resolve and deal with criminal defendants that suffer from mental health problems.

When Huntsman left the governorship in 2009 to be the United States Ambassador to China, Huntsman chose Forster to swear him in. Governor Gary Herbert appointed Forster to the Utah Court of Appeals in May 2010. She was unanimously confirmed by the Utah State Senate in June 2010.

== Community involvement ==
Forster has been extensively involved in various professional organizations over the years. In the fall of 2004, Forster was profiled in the University of Utah’s alumni magazine, Continuum. She served as a member of the University of Utah Young Alumni Board from 2004–2007. In 2009, Judge Forster was recognized on the Utah Legal Elite List compiled by Utah Business magazine.
