= Jill Parrish =

American judge (born 1961)

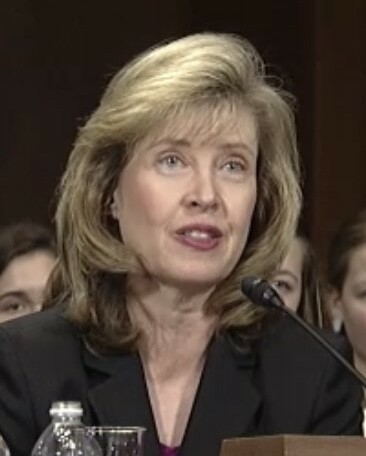

Chief Judge of the United States District Court for the District of Utah
- Incumbent
- Assumed office October 1, 2025
- Preceded by: Robert J. Shelby

Judge of the United States District Court for the District of Utah
- Incumbent
- Assumed office August 17, 2015
- Appointed by: Barack Obama
- Preceded by: Dee Benson

Associate Justice of the Utah Supreme Court
- In office January 2003 – August 17, 2015
- Appointed by: Mike Leavitt
- Preceded by: Richard C. Howe
- Succeeded by: John A. Pearce

Personal details
- Born: Jill Annette Niederhauser; August 16, 1961 (age 65) Ogden, Utah, U.S.
- Education: Weber State University (BA); Yale University (JD)

Jill Annette Niederhauser Parrish (born August 16, 1961) is an American lawyer who serves as the chief United States district judge of the United States District Court for the District of Utah. She served as a justice of the Utah Supreme Court from 2003 to 2015.

Parrish grew up in Utah and received her Bachelor of Arts degree from Weber State University in 1982. In 1985 she received her Juris Doctor from Yale Law School. Parrish then served as a law clerk for Judge David Kent Winder of the United States District Court for the District of Utah. Parrish also served as an assistant United States attorney in the Civil Division of the United States Attorney’s Office for the District of Utah from 1995 until her appointment to the Utah Supreme Court.

== Early life and education ==
Parrish was born Jill Annette Niederhauser in Ogden, Utah, on August 16, 1961, the daughter of Ed and Beulah Niederhauser. She lived in Ogden until she left for law school in 1982. Parrish graduated from Ogden High School in 1979. She attended Weber State University, graduating with a Bachelor of Arts in Communication and Political Science in 1982. She attended Yale Law School, graduating with a Juris Doctor in 1985. During her time at Yale, Parrish was on the Yale Moot Court Team.

== Early legal career ==
After graduating from law school, Parrish served as a law clerk to Judge David Kent Winder of the United States District Court for the District of Utah. Upon completion of her clerkship in 1986 she joined the Salt Lake City law firm of Parr, Waddoups, Brown, Gee & Loveless as an associate. She became a shareholder at the firm in 1990. During her time at Parr, Waddoups, Parrish’s focus was on commercial litigation. One high-profile case was Gold Standard, Inc. v. Getty Oil Co., 915 P.2d 1060, (Utah 1996). Gold Standard, Inc and Getty Oil Co. entered into a joint mining venture. When Gold Standard failed to fund its portion in the venture, Getty Oil reduced its share. Gold Standard sued Getty Oil claiming wrongful conversion, breach of contract and fraud. Parrish represented the defendant, Getty Oil Co. The trial court granted a partial summary judgment in favor of Getty Oil Co. The Utah Supreme court affirmed the trial court's partial summary judgment in 1996.

From 1995 to 2003, Parrish served as an assistant United States attorney in the Civil Division of the United States Attorney's Office for the District of Utah, where she supervised the financial litigation unit. Parrish started at the United States Attorney's office during Scott M. Matheson's tenure as the United States attorney. While at the U.S. Attorney’s office, Parrish worked on cases involving Revised Statute 2477 (commonly known as, RS 2477.) In the Civil division, Parrish also represented the United States in torts and in environmental and employment cases.

RS 2477 became a law shortly after the American Civil War as part of the Mining act of 1866. The law states that "the right-of-way for the construction of highways across public lands, not reserved for public uses, is hereby granted." RS 2477 was repealed by the United States Congress in 1976, but any existing rights-of-way were protected as long as they were in compliance with the statute. Controversy arose in the 1980s when several Utah officials argued that passage of a vehicle alone amounted to construction of a highway. This would give right of way for construction of a highway on any one of the numerous dirt trails and tracks throughout Southern Utah. This brought controversy because the construction of highways on these trails allegedly would be devastating to Utah wildlife. Parrish was involved in the lengthy litigation process that involved these roads in Southern Utah. The laws regarding RS 2477 claims are still not well defined and continue to stir up controversy.

== Judicial career ==
=== Utah Supreme Court ===
Parrish was appointed to the Utah Supreme Court in January 2003, by Governor Mike Leavitt, following the retirement of Justice Richard C. Howe. Parrish served as chair of both the Supreme Court Committee on Civility and Professionalism and the State Law Library Oversight Committee. She was a member of the Court Technology Committee until October 2010. She is a past president of the Utah Chapter of the Federal Bar Association and formerly served as the State Court Liaison to that organization. Parrish served as the Supreme Court representative on the Utah Judicial Council.

=== Federal judicial service ===
On September 18, 2014, President Barack Obama nominated Parrish to serve as a United States district judge of the United States District Court for the District of Utah, to the seat vacated by Judge Dee Benson, who assumed senior status on January 1, 2014. On December 16, 2014, her nomination was returned to the President due to the sine die adjournment of the 113th Congress. On January 7, 2015, President Obama renominated her to the same position. She received a hearing before the Judiciary Committee on January 21, 2015. On February 26, 2015, her nomination was reported out of committee by voice vote. On May 21, 2015, the United States Senate confirmed her by a 100–0 vote. She received her judicial commission on August 17, 2015. A formal investiture for Parrish was held on November 23, 2015. She became chief judge on October 1, 2025.

== Selected opinions ==
=== Utah Department of Transportation v. G. Kay, Inc. ===
On September 26, 2003, Justice Parrish authored her first opinion for the Utah Supreme court in the case of Utah Department of Transportation v. G. Kay, Inc. 78 P.3d 612 (Utah 2003). In this case, the Utah Department of Transportation (UDOT) condemned property owned by G. Kay, Inc. to make the Legacy Nature Preserve, a 2,100-acre area that was to be set aside to mitigate the environmental impacts of the construction of the proposed Legacy highway. When UDOT moved to condemn the land owned by G. Kay, Inc., G. Kay moved to dismiss UDOT’s complaint, because they did not have the authority to condemn its property. The court affirmed that UDOT did have the authority to condemn the property to mitigate the environmental impact of the construction of the Legacy Parkway Project (Legacy Highway.) Chief Justice Durham, Associate Chief Justice Durrant, Justice Wilkins, and Judge Nehring concurred in Justice Parrish's opinion.

=== State v. Jeffs ===
State v. Jeffs, ( No. 20080408, Filed July 27, 2010, 2010 UT 49). The state of Utah charged Fundamentalist Church of Jesus Christ of Latter-day Saints (FLDS) leader Warren Jeffs with two counts of rape as an accomplice against Elissa Wall. Wall was a student at Alta Academy, an FLDS school where Jeffs was both a teacher and the principal. Wall had been taught by Jeffs, both in school and in church, that to disobey his teachings or those of his counselors was to be denied spiritual salvation. Jeffs’ two rape charges were the result of sexual intercourse that ensued between Elissa Wall, who was 14 at the time, and her 19-year-old cousin, Allen Steed, after Jeffs allegedly forced Wall to marry Steed. Jeffs was convicted after a jury trial in 2007 and sentenced to two consecutive terms of five years to life. Jeffs raised seven issues that he thought invalidated the jury verdict. On July 27, 2010, the Utah Supreme court reversed Jeffs’ two convictions of rape and remanded for a new trial on the grounds that "the trial court’s instructions to the jury regarding lack of consent were in error." Justice Parrish authored the court’s decision with Chief Justice Durham, Associate Chief Justice Durrant, and Justice Nehring in concurrence. Justice Parrish wrote in the conclusion of the court’s decision that "We regret the effect our opinion today may have on the victim of the underlying crime, to whom we do not wish to cause additional pain. However, we must ensure that the laws are applied evenly and appropriately."

=== State v. Willis ===
In State v. Willis 100 P.3d 1218 (Utah, 2006) The defendant, Wade Willis challenged the constitutionality of the Utah code that prohibits certain "restricted persons" including those who are on probation for a felony, from possessing firearms. Willis, who was on probation for a third degree felony, was found in possession of a nine-millimeter handgun. Willis was charged with a second degree felony under Utah Code section 76-10-503(2)(a) which prohibits convicted felons from possessing a firearm. Willis argues that this violates his right to bear arms, a right guaranteed by the Utah constitution (Article 1, Section 6.) Justice Parrish and the court in a unanimous opinion, rejected his argument. Parrish stated "that there is no evidence in the legislative history to suggest the existence of an intent to extend the right of gun possession to felons."

=== American Bush v. City of South Salt Lake ===
In American Bush v. City of South Salt Lake, 140. P.3d 1235 (Utah 2006). the City of South Salt Lake passed an ordinance that prohibited sexually oriented business employees from "[a]ppear[ing] in a state of nudity before a patron on the premises of a sexually oriented business." American Bush, Paradise Modeling and Leather and Lace filed an action in state court claiming that this ordinance violated their free speech rights as defined by the Utah State Constitution. The court granted summary judgment in favor of the City of South Salt lake, stating that the right to "communicate freely their thoughts and opinions" did not extend to nude dancing in sexually oriented businesses. Justice Parrish, with Associate Chief Justice Wilkins and Justice Durrant in concurrence, affirmed the court’s summary judgment.

=== University of Utah v. Shurtleff ===
University of Utah v. Shurtleff 144 P.3d 1109 (Utah, 2006). Utah Attorney General Mark Shurtleff issued Opinion No. 01-002, which claimed that the University’s policy prohibiting firearms on campus violated Utah’s Uniform Firearms Act, The University sued the Attorney general for a declaratory judgement claiming that, under Article X, Section 4 of the Utah Constitution, they could disregard Utah Law when it interfered with academic affairs. During the appeals process, Utah Legislature passed section 63-98-102, which prohibits state and local entities from enforcing policies that inhibit the possession of firearms on public or private property. Justice Parrish with Associate Chief Justice Wilkins, Justice Durrant, and Justice Nehring in concurrence gave the opinion that the University of Utah did not have the power to disregard Utah Law. Chief Justice Durham dissented.

== Public speeches ==
On October 12, 2005, Parrish delivered a speech at the Admissions Ceremony for new inductees to the Utah State Bar that was published in the Utah Bar Journal in its January/February 2006 issue. In her speech Lessons From Kindergarten, Justice Parrish advises that to achieve success in the legal profession, you need more than just knowledge of the law. You need "those other characteristics and qualities that you bring to bear in your professional life- the really important things, the lessons you learned in Kindergarten." Parrish advised new lawyers to share, play fair, practice with professionalism and civility, be responsible and work hard, and maintain a sense of perspective.

Legal offices
Preceded by Richard C. Howe	Associate Justice of the Utah Supreme Court; 2003–2015	Succeeded by John A. Pearce
Preceded by Dee Benson	Judge of the United States District Court for the District of Utah; 2015–present	Incumbent
Preceded by Robert J. Shelby	Chief Judge of the United States District Court for the District of Utah; 2025–present	Incumbent
