= Albert Sherman Christensen =

American judge

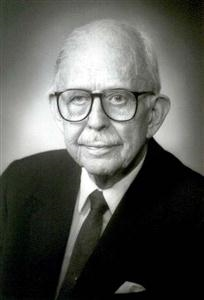

Senior Judge of the United States District Court for the District of Utah
- In office August 17, 1971 – August 13, 1996

Judge of the United States District Court for the District of Utah
- In office June 26, 1954 – August 17, 1971
- Appointed by: Dwight D. Eisenhower
- Preceded by: Seat established by 68 Stat. 8
- Succeeded by: Aldon J. Anderson

Personal details
- Born: Albert Sherman Christensen; June 9, 1905 Manti, Utah
- Died: August 13, 1996 (aged 91) Provo, Utah
- Party: Republican
- Education: George Washington University Law School (LL.B., J.D.)

Albert Sherman Christensen (June 9, 1905 – August 13, 1996) was a trial attorney, author, and a United States district judge of the United States District Court for the District of Utah. Christensen was the first member of the Church of Jesus Christ of Latter-day Saints to be appointed in Utah. He authored six books, volumes of poetry, and many legal articles. One of Christensen's most significant contributions to the legal community was his establishment of the United States' first American Inn of Court in 1980.

== Education and career ==
Christensen was born on June 9, 1905, in Manti, Utah, to A.H. and Jennie Snow Christensen. He was one of four children. Christensen's father was a successful attorney first in Manti and later in Provo, Utah. As a boy Christensen worked as a clerk in his father's office, where he met individuals such as Arthur V. Watkins, A.H. Christensen's law partner and future United States Senator. Christensen attended Brigham Young University from 1923 to 1927, where he met his wife. He married Lois Bowen of Spanish Fork, Utah in 1927 and the couple had three children.

In 1927, Christensen moved to Washington, D.C. where he worked first as a file clerk for the United States War Department and later as an assistant to the chancellor of the law school at National University (now George Washington University). The chancellor was impressed with Christensen's work and offered him a scholarship to attend the university's law school. Christensen received a Bachelor of Laws from National University School of Law (now George Washington University Law School) in Washington, D.C. in 1931, after which he joined his father's law firm in Provo and practiced with him as a trial lawyer from 1932 to 1942. Following the outbreak of World War II, Christensen served in the United States Navy from 1942 to 1945, returning to private practice in Provo from 1945 to 1954. In 1939, Christensen ran unsuccessfully on the Republican ticket for Congress.

== Federal judicial service ==
On May 12, 1954, Christensen was nominated by President Dwight D. Eisenhower to a new seat on the United States District Court for the District of Utah created by 68 Stat. 8. He was confirmed by the United States Senate on May 27, 1954, and received his commission on May 28, 1954. Christensen was sworn in on June 26, 1954, and became the first member of the Church of Jesus Christ of Latter-day Saints to be appointed to the federal bench in Utah. Christensen received a Juris Doctor from George Washington University Law School in 1968, and assumed senior status on August 17, 1971. He was a visiting professor at the University of Utah College of Law in 1975, and at the J. Reuben Clark Law School at Brigham Young University, also in 1975.

=== Anecdote ===
In 1964, Norwegian immigrant Aslaug Haviland was to be granted citizenship. She was both deaf and blind and Christensen offered to waive the repetition of the oath of citizenship, but Haviland requested to participate. Christensen made arrangements so that as he read the oath, a friend of Haviland's translated it into sign language and tapped it onto Haviland's palm. Christensen was "touched" by the scene, and said later that he purposefully kept another case—this one involving an individual who was about to be deported—outside of his courtroom so that the soon-to-be-deported man would not have to witness new citizens being sworn in.

=== Notable cases and judicial philosophy ===
Throughout his career, Christensen was involved in several antitrust cases including Pioneer Drive-in Theater vs. MGM and others in 1963, Fisher Baking vs. Continental Baking and Utah Gas Pipeline Co. vs. El Paso Natural Gas in 1964, United States vs. Beatrice Foods in 1969, and Gardiner and others vs. Gold Strike Stamps in 1973. As a district judge he also served on several committees of the Judicial conference of the United States. Some of his contributions as a committee member included drawing up new guidelines for judges in 1969 and producing a model courtroom design. At his numerous speaking engagements, Christensen frequently warned against accepting lawlessness as an instrument of social change and insisted that "the American Dream does live". Although Christensen became experienced in antitrust cases, the length of his service ensured that he would hear and judge cases ranging from two young men accused of illegally shooting ducks in a pond after sunset, to a murder case on Hill Air Force Base. Christensen was also notable, at least in Utah, for his work with providing those in indigent circumstances with legal counsel. In 1971 he attacked a Utah law which denied legal counsel to indigents charged with a misdemeanor that carried with it a six-month or less incarceration sentence. As early as 1965, Christensen had introduced a tax-supported plan by which indigents charged with federal crimes could receive legal aid.

Christensen announced his intention to take senior status in 1970, after 16 years of work on the federal bench. His announcement was accepted by President Richard Nixon, who asked Christensen to remain in office until a successor could be named. Although he had expressed his intentions to delay taking senior judge status in order to implement reform in the federal courts, in November 1970 at the announcement of his change of status, Christensen stated that he felt he could carry out reforms more effectively as a senior judge. Christensen took senior status on August 17, 1971. Even after his change of status, however, Christensen was involved with many large national cases including the giant IBM-Telex antitrust case of 1973. As of 1976 Christensen's rate of being affirmed on civil cases was 80 percent and on criminal cases 92 percent.

== Other service ==
In 1975, Christensen became an adjunct professor of law at the University of Utah. From 1975 to 1977 he was an adjunct professor at the J. Reuben Clark Law School at BYU, where he taught trial practice.

Teaching trial practice law, a growing conviction that students and new lawyers did not have enough training in trial practice, and the urging of Chief Justice Warren Burger spurred Christensen, along with J. Reuben Clark Law School Dean Rex Lee and Chief Justice Burger, to experiment with the British Inns of Court system to try to create an American equivalent. A pilot program was tested at BYU, and in the fall of 1979 a draft for an Inn of Court was created. In 1980, Christensen was one of the founders of the first American Inn of Court in the Provo/Salt Lake City area of Utah. The American Inn met for the first time in February 1980 in Provo. With the success of the first American Inn of Court, a second was established in 1981 by University of Utah Students. In the fall 1983, Chief Justice Burger created a Committee of the Judicial Conference of the United States on the American Inns of Court. Christensen was named the chair, and remained in that position until July 1984, when he resigned due to the deteriorating health of his wife. He received the 1989 Chairman's Award for his contributions to the American Inns of Court movement. The award was renamed in his honor that year and the A. Sherman Christensen Award is presented yearly to a member of the American Inns of Court who demonstrates distinguished, exceptional, and significant leadership.

== Later life and death ==
Christensen continued to serve as a settlement judge in Salt Lake City, Utah until his wife's death in 1992. Christensen died in Provo, Utah on August 13, 1996, at the age of 91.

== Legacy ==
Christensen received many awards and distinctions in both his practice as a trial lawyer and his time as a United States district judge. He was named president of the Utah State Bar from 1950 to 1951 and received both the "Outstanding Achievement Award" (1971) and the "Judge of the Year Award" (1977) from the Utah Bar as well. In addition, he was named an honorary member of the Society of the Bar and Gavel, University of Utah (1972); Order of the Coif, University of Utah College of Law (1973); and the Federal Bar Association (1974). Other awards and honors include "Outstanding Service Award", International Academy of Trial Lawyers (1978); "Distinguished Jurist Award", Federal Bar Association (1989); "Chairman's award", American Inns of Court Foundation (1989); "President's Award", Brigham Young University (1989); The American Bar Association Medal (1990); and the Fulbright Award for Distinguished Service, George Washington University (1991). Christensen was survived by his three children, 14 grandchildren, and 23 great-grandchildren.

== Writings ==
Christensen authored six books and many academic articles. Four of his six books are on legal topics, but Christensen also authored a history of Mount Timpanogos entitled A Story of the Mountain published in 1985, an autobiography entitled The Hard Rich Soil: Some Recollections and Letters of A.H. Christensen in 1966, and two volumes of poetry. Christensen's academic works include Handbook of Trial Practices in the United States District Court published in 1969, Law Briefs for Laymen in 1975, Preliminary Notes on Principles and Procedures of Superior Legal Advocacy: Where the Rules and Code Leave Off in 1976, Persons and Processes: An Anecdotal View of Federal Judicial Administration, 19554 to 1991 published in 1993, "The Abalone Shell" in 1996. In total, Christensen wrote over 200 court opinions. Eighty-five of these were reviewed on appeal with eighteen being reversed, seven affirmed with qualifications, and sixty affirmed without qualification.

Legal offices
Preceded by Seat established by 68 Stat. 8	Judge of the United States District Court for the District of Utah; 1954–1971	Succeeded by Aldon J. Anderson
