= Clark Waddoups =

American judge (born 1946)

Senior Judge of the United States District Court for the District of Utah
- Incumbent
- Assumed office January 31, 2019

Judge of the United States District Court for the District of Utah
- In office October 21, 2008 – January 31, 2019
- Appointed by: George W. Bush
- Preceded by: Paul G. Cassell
- Succeeded by: David Barlow

Personal details
- Born: April 21, 1946 (age 80) Arco, Idaho, U.S.
- Education: Brigham Young University (BA); University of Utah (JD)

Clark Waddoups (born April 21, 1946) is a senior United States district judge of the United States District Court for the District of Utah.

== Education and legal career ==
Waddoups received his Bachelor of Arts degree from Brigham Young University in 1970 and his Juris Doctor from the S.J. Quinney College of Law at the University of Utah in 1973. He was a partner in the law firm of Parr, Waddoups, Brown, Gee & Loveless where he was a trial lawyer specializing in commercial litigation, including antitrust, securities, labor/employment, banking, construction, environmental and insurance claims. Waddoups represented clients in industries such as heavy manufacturing, broadcasting, banking and finance, automotive, oil, and real estate.

Waddoups practiced for O'Melveny & Myers in Los Angeles before joining Parr Waddoups in 1981. Prior to that, he served as a law clerk for Judge J. Clifford Wallace of the United States Court of Appeals for the Ninth Circuit, from 1973 to 1974.

Prior to his appointment Waddoups, who is admitted to practice in California and before all state and federal courts in Utah, was a registered lobbyist in the State of Utah, an active member of the Utah Supreme Court Advisory Committee on the Rules of Evidence, and past President of the A. Sherman Christensen American Inn of Court.

=== Federal judicial service ===
Waddoups was nominated by President George W. Bush on April 29, 2008. He was confirmed by the Senate on September 26, 2008. He received his commission on October 21, 2008. He assumed senior status on January 31, 2019.

=== Notable rulings and selected opinions ===
==== Kody Brown, et al. v. Gary Herbert, Governor of Utah, et al. ====
On July 13, 2011, Kody Brown and family, from the TLC reality television show Sister Wives, filed a complaint in the United States 10th District Court, District of Utah, to challenge Utah's polygamy laws. Jonathan Turley of George Washington University represented the plaintiffs in the case. The plaintiffs were found to have legal standing, though no charges have been filed against them. On December 13, 2013, approximately eleven months after he heard oral arguments in the case, Judge Waddoups rendered a 91-page decision striking down the cohabitation clause of Utah's polygamy statute as unconstitutional, but also allowing Utah to maintain its ban on multiple marriage licenses. Unlawful cohabitation, where prosecutors did not need to prove that a marriage ceremony had taken place (only that a couple had lived together), had been a major tool used to prosecute polygamy in Utah since the 1882 Edmunds Act.

==== HB 497 ====
Waddoups blocked an immigration law signed by Gov. Gary Herbert in March 2011 that would require police to check citizenship status upon arrest. According to ABC News, Waddoups "issued his ruling in Salt Lake City just 14 hours after the law went into effect, saying that there is sufficient evidence that at least some portions of the Utah legislation will be found unconstitutional.

==== United States v. John and Susan Ross ====
In December of 2009, Judge Waddoups sentenced two Davis School District employees, John and Susan Ross, for money laundering and fraud. The couple pleaded guilty and received 36 months probation, 3,000 hours of community service, $10,000 in fines, and $350,000 in restitution. Waddoups issued no jail time, against the prosecutors request, causing some to ask whether the judge was "going easy" on white-collar crimes.

==== Fitisemanu v. United States ====
In December 2019, Waddoups ruled that Samoans should be recognized as U.S. citizens. This decision was later reversed by the United States Court of Appeals for the Tenth Circuit and is pending certiorari before the Supreme Court of the United States.

Legal offices
Preceded by Paul G. Cassell	Judge of the United States District Court for the District of Utah; 2007–2019	Succeeded by David Barlow
