= David Sam =

American judge (born 1933)

Senior Judge of the United States District Court for the District of Utah
- Incumbent
- Assumed office November 1, 1999

Chief Judge of the United States District Court for the District of Utah
- In office 1997–1999
- Preceded by: David Kent Winder
- Succeeded by: Dee Benson

Judge of the United States District Court for the District of Utah
- In office October 16, 1985 – November 1, 1999
- Appointed by: Ronald Reagan
- Preceded by: Aldon J. Anderson
- Succeeded by: Paul G. Cassell

Personal details
- Born: August 12, 1933 (age 93) Hobart, Indiana, U.S.
- Education: Brigham Young University (BS); University of Utah (JD)

David Sam (born August 12, 1933) is a senior United States district judge of the United States District Court for the District of Utah.

== Education and career ==
Sam was born on August 12, 1933, in Hobart, Indiana, to parents recently emigrated from Romania. He received a Bachelor of Science degree from Brigham Young University in 1957. He received a Juris Doctor from the S.J. Quinney College of Law at the University of Utah in 1960. He was a United States Air Force Captain in the JAG Corps from 1961 to 1963. He was in private practice of law in Duchesne, Utah and Roosevelt, Utah from 1963 to 1973. He was a Duchesne County attorney from 1966 to 1972. He was a Duchesne County Commissioner from 1972 to 1974. He was in private practice of law in Duchesne from 1973 to 1976. He was a District Judge of the Fourth Judicial District of Utah from 1976 to 1985. He was part-time faculty at Brigham Young University from 1977 to 1985.

=== Federal judicial service ===
Sam was nominated by President Ronald Reagan on September 9, 1985, to a seat on the United States District Court for the District of Utah vacated by Judge Aldon J. Anderson. He was confirmed by the United States Senate on October 16, 1985, and received commission the same day. He served as chief judge from 1997 to 1999. He assumed senior status on November 1, 1999.

== Sources ==
Legal offices
Preceded by Aldon J. Anderson	Judge of the United States District Court for the District of Utah; 1985–1999	Succeeded by Paul G. Cassell
Preceded by David Kent Winder	Chief Judge of the United States District Court for the District of Utah; 1997–1999	Succeeded by Dee Benson
