= Melissa Holyoak =

American lawyer and government official

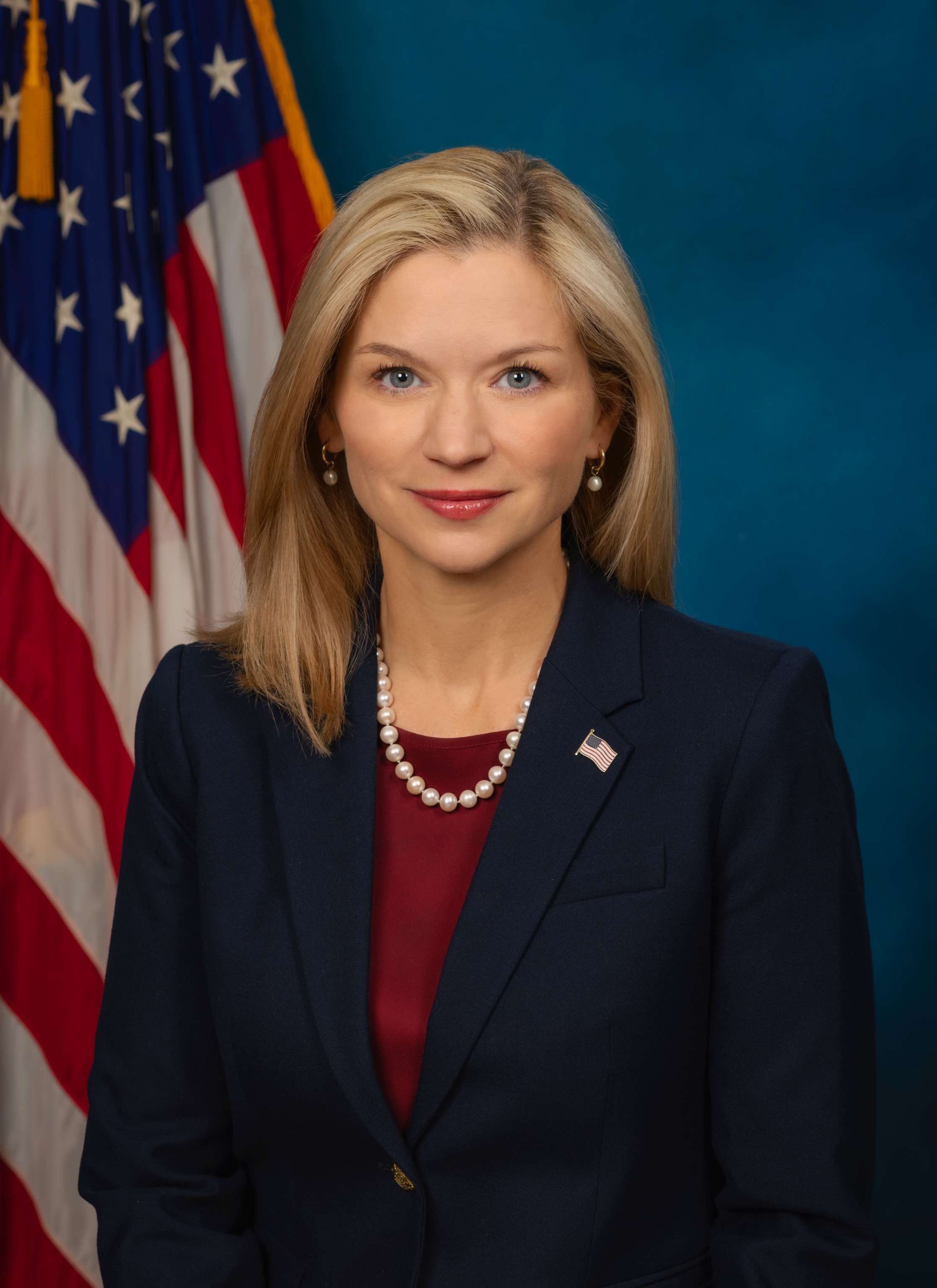
- Official portrait, 2026

United States Attorney for the District of Utah
- Incumbent
- Assumed office November 17, 2025; Interim: November 17, 2025 – May 28, 2026
- President: Donald Trump
- Preceded by: Trina A. Higgins; Felice John Viti (acting)

Commissioner of the Federal Trade Commission
- In office March 25, 2024 – November 17, 2025
- President: Joe Biden; Donald Trump
- Preceded by: Christine S. Wilson
- Succeeded by: vacant

Solicitor General of Utah
- In office September 2020 – March 2024
- Attorney General: Sean Reyes
- Preceded by: Tyler R. Green
- Succeeded by: Stanford E. Purser

Personal details
- Born: Melissa Ann Watkins; October 6, 1976 (age 50) Boise, Idaho, U.S.
- Party: Republican
- Spouse: Joshua Holyoak
- Children: 4
- Education: University of Utah (BA, JD)

Melissa Ann Holyoak (born October 6, 1976) is an American lawyer who has served as the United States Attorney for the District of Utah since 2025. She served as a commissioner of the Federal Trade Commission (FTC) from 2024 to 2025 and as the solicitor general of Utah from 2020 to 2024. She is a member of the Republican Party.

== Early life and education ==
Holyoak was born Melissa Ann Watkins on October 6, 1976, in Boise, Idaho. She graduated from the University of Utah in 2000 with a Bachelor of Arts in French. She then attended the university's S.J. Quinney College of Law, where she was an editor of the Utah Law Review. She graduated in 2003 with a Juris Doctor degree with Order of the Coif membership.

== Career ==
After graduating from law school, Holyoak was an associate in the Washington, D.C. office of the law firm O'Melveny & Myers from 2003 to 2008 while her husband attended medical school in Baltimore. After spending several years as a homemaker while raising her and her husband's young children, Holyoak became a part-time public interest attorney with the Center for Class Action Fairness in 2012. She served as president and general counsel of Hamilton Lincoln Law Institute, a Washington, D.C.-based public interest firm representing consumers challenging unfair class actions and regulatory overreach. Holyoak was one of the successful petitioners in the 2019 Supreme Court case Frank v. Gaos.

In September 2020, Holyoak became the Utah Solicitor General with the Utah Attorney General’s Office, where she managed the civil appeals, criminal appeals, constitutional defense, and antitrust and data privacy divisions. In that capacity, she oversaw merger reviews, data privacy, and antitrust enforcement actions and provided leadership in consumer protection matters.

== Federal Trade Commission (FTC) ==
=== Nomination and confirmation ===
A Republican, Holyoak was nominated by U.S. president Joe Biden in July 2023 to serve as a commissioner of the Federal Trade Commission. Her nomination was confirmed by the Senate on March 7, 2024.

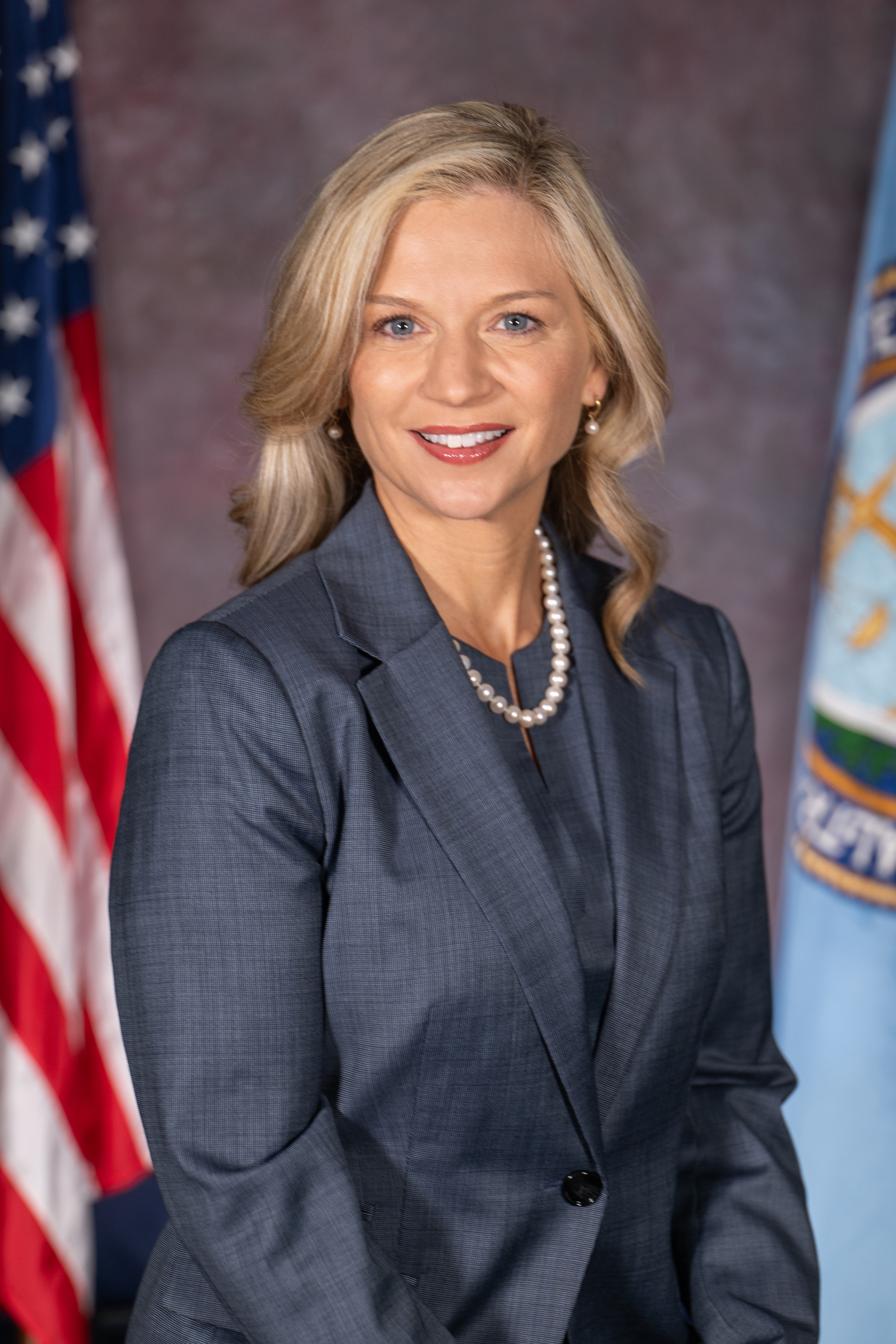
Official portrait as FTC Commissioner, 2024

=== Tenure ===
In May 2024, Holyoak dissented when the Commission conditioned approval of the $64.5 billion acquisition of Pioneer Natural Resources by ExxonMobil upon the prohibition of founder Scott D. Sheffield from the company's board.

In May 2024, Holyoak dissented when the Commission decided to proceed to trial in its challenge to the $24.6 billion proposed acquisition of Albertsons by Kroger.

In June 2024, Holyoak, dissented when the Commission issued a final rule banning non-compete clauses in most employment contracts. In August 2024, U.S. District Judge Ada Brown issued a nationwide injunction prohibiting enforcement of the rule.

In September 2024, Holyoak dissented when the Commission conditioned approval of the $53 billion acquisition of Hess Corporation by Chevron Corporation upon the prohibition of John B. Hess from the company's board.

== Personal life ==
Holyoak's husband, Joshua Holyoak, is a urologist. They have four children and live in Utah.
