= Dale A. Kimball =

American judge (born 1939)

Dale Albert Kimball
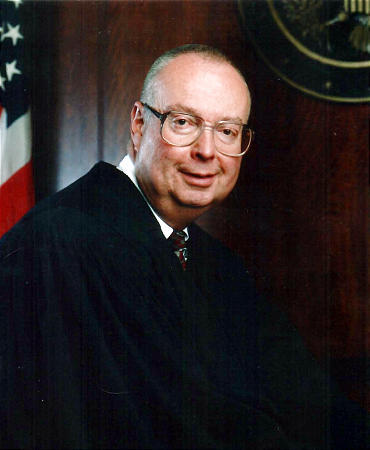
- Portrait of Judge Kimball

Senior Judge of the United States District Court for the District of Utah
- Incumbent
- Assumed office November 30, 2009

Judge of the United States District Court for the District of Utah
- In office October 24, 1997 – November 30, 2009
- Appointed by: Bill Clinton
- Preceded by: David Keith Winder
- Succeeded by: David Nuffer

Personal details
- Born: Dale Albert Kimball; 1939 (age 86–87) Provo, Utah, U.S.
- Education: Brigham Young University (BS); University of Utah (JD)

Dale Albert Kimball (born 1939) is a senior United States district judge of the United States District Court for the District of Utah.

== Early life and education ==
Kimball was born in Provo, Utah, grew up on a dairy farm in Draper, Utah, and worked in the fields where his family grew alfalfa, sugar beets, and grain. He continued to work on the family farm throughout his schooling, including his time in law school. His family sold their farm to the Catholic Diocese in 1996 and it is now the site of the Skaggs Catholic Center, which houses Juan Diego High School.

Kimball first became interested in law while taking a commercial law class from E.L. Crawford at Jordan High School. Kimball graduated magna cum laude from Brigham Young University with a Bachelor of Science degree in political science. In 1967, he received his Juris Doctor from the University of Utah College of Law, graduating Order of the Coif and second in his class. While attending law school, Kimball was a member of the Phi Kappa Phi honor society and was the Case Note Editor of the Utah Law Review.

== Career ==
After graduating from law school, Kimball began his legal practice at Van Cott, Bagley, Cornwall & McCarthy in Salt Lake City, Utah, where Kimball maintained a full-time general practice until 1974. In 1974, Kimball became a full-time law professor at BYU's J. Reuben Clark Law School. In his second year as a full-time professor, Kimball also co-founded the law firm formerly known as Kimball, Parr, Waddoups, Brown & Gee. The firm is now known as Parr, Brown, Gee & Loveless. Kimball continued to teach part-time at BYU from 1976 to 1980. From 1975 until his appointment as a United States District Judge in 1997, Kimball maintained a full-time legal practice, primarily in commercial litigation.

=== Federal judicial service ===
On September 4, 1997, President Bill Clinton nominated Kimball as a United States district judge of the United States District Court for the District of Utah. Kimball's nomination was confirmed by the United States Senate on October 21, 1997, and he received his commission on October 24, 1997. On November 24, 1997, Kimball was sworn in as a United States District Judge. Kimball replaced the Judge David K. Winder, who took senior status in June 1997. After twelve years as a full-time district court judge, Kimball took senior status on November 30, 2009.

=== Notable cases ===
During his time on the bench, Kimball has presided over many notable cases, such as the Brian David Mitchell criminal trial, case no. 2:08cr125DAK. In the case of Southern Utah Wilderness Alliance v. Norton, Case No. 2:99cv852DAK, Judge Kimball's decision was reversed by the Tenth Circuit, but the United States Supreme Court then reversed the Tenth Circuit and affirmed Judge Kimball (9-0), Norton v SUWA, 542 U.S. 55 (2004). More than 800 of his memorandum decisions appear on Westlaw.

In 1999, Kimball sat by designation with the Tenth Circuit of Appeals, authoring two published opinions and two unpublished opinions: Zeran v. Diamond Broadcasting, Inc., 203 F.3d 714 (10th Cir, 2000); and United States v. Moore, 198 F.3d 793 (10th Cir. 1999); Hutchinson v. Pfeil, 201 F.3d 448 (10th Cir. 1999) (unpublished); Standard v. Union Pacific Railroad Co., 198 F.3d 258 (10th Cir. 1999) (unpublished).

In May 2009, to help with the congested dockets of a neighboring district, Kimball sat by designation in the United States District Court for the District of Idaho.

=== Brian David Mitchell and Wanda Barzee ===
After defendant Brian David Mitchell was declared incompetent to stand trial in Utah state court for the alleged kidnapping of Elizabeth Smart, he and co-defendant Wanda Barzee were indicted by a federal grand jury for kidnapping and unlawful transportation of a minor. On May 25, 2011, Judge Kimball sentenced Mitchell to life in prison under the federal sentencing guidelines and the sentencing factors found in 18 U.S.C. § 3553a. Mitchell decided not to appeal.

After being declared competent to stand trial as a result of forced medication ordered by the state court, Wanda Barzee entered into a plea agreement with the federal government. Judge Kimball sentenced Barzee on November 17, 2009, to 15 years in prison.

== Community and professional service ==
Kimball is a member of the Church of Jesus Christ of Latter-day Saints and has served in many leadership positions within the church, including bishop, high councilor, stake president, and Regional representative of the Twelve.

=== Former activities ===
- Chairman of Utah State Bar Judicial Performance Evaluation Committee
- Chairman of Utah State Bar Ethics and Discipline Committee
- Chairman of Utah State Bar Committee on the Unauthorized Practice of Law
- Counselor to the Inn of the American Inn of Court I
- Member of Utah Federal District Court, Mediation/Arbitration Panels
- Chairman of Pioneer Theater Board
- Member of Deseret News Publishing Company Board of Directors and Member of
- Executive Committee
- Member of Alta View Hospital Board of Governors
- Member of Jordan Education Foundation Board
- Trustee of University of Utah College of Law Alumni Board
- Member of Board of Salt Lake chapter of J. Reuben Clark Law Society
- Member of Judicial Conference Committee on Administration of the Bankruptcy System
- Member of Tenth Circuit Judicial Conference

=== Current activities ===
- Fellow of the American Bar Foundation
- Master of the Bench for the American Inn of Court I
- Member of the Board of Federal Bar Association, Salt Lake Chapter
- Member of the Judicial Conference Committee on Criminal Law

== Awards and publications ==
Kimball graduated second in his class at the University of Utah College of Law and was elected to the Order of the Coif. Order of the Coif is an honorary scholastic society consisting of members graduating in the top ten percent of their class. In 1996, Kimball was honored by the Utah State Bar as the "Distinguished Lawyer of the Year". In 2010, Kimball was honored by the Federal Bar Association, Salt Lake Chapter as the "Judge of the Year".

Legal offices
Preceded by David Keith Winder	Judge of the United States District Court for the District of Utah; 1997–2009	Succeeded by David Nuffer
