= Judge Ritter =

Judge Ritter may refer to:

- Halsted L. Ritter (1868–1951), judge of the United States District Court for the Southern District of Florida
- Willis William Ritter (1899–1978), judge of the United States District Court for the District of Utah
