= Noah's Event Venue =

American hospitality company

- Industry: Hospitality
- Founded: 2003
- Founder: William Bowser
- Defunct: 2020
- Fate: Chapter 11 bankruptcy filing due to fraud causing all the venue to close immediately
- Headquarters: Lehi, Utah, United States
- Key people: William Bowser, CEO
- Website: noahseventvenue.com

NOAH'S Event Venue was an American company which operated event venues for weddings, corporate functions, and other occasions. At their peak the company had over 39 locations across the United States. Headquartered in Lehi, Utah and founded in 2003, the company declared bankruptcy in 2019 amid accusations of fraud and under an order from Federal Judge Joel Marker closed all locations in February 2020.

== History ==
The company was founded in Utah in 2003 by William "Bil" Bowser, the company's CEO as of 2019.

The first NOAH'S Event Venue opened in January 2007 in Lindon, Utah. By the end of 2011 the company had a total of six sites. By late 2018, NOAH had over 30 sites nationwide.

In February 2019, a manager of nine NOAH's venues wrote to investors, alleging that the company "hadn't been paying property taxes or insurance on the properties as required under its contract".

In March 2019, Bowser was quoted as advising investors that about 85 to 90 percent of money from one venue was used as "funds for work on other buildings and 10 percent for operations and expenses."

The company declared bankruptcy in May 2019 according to The Salt Lake Tribune and is accused of being a Ponzi scheme: investors say they were told their money would be used to buy a site in Carmel, Indiana but allege their money was instead used to pay off earlier investors. Federal Judge Tena Campbell subsequently ruled that plaintiffs were more likely than not to prevail in court, but as of June 2019 had not ruled on fraud allegations.

In June 2019, Judge Campbell ordered a writ of attachment for over $800,000 against a property Bowser had sold in Park City, Utah.

On February 7, 2020, NOAH's abruptly closed all of their remaining venues without notice, leaving many wedding couples and other clients scrambling to find a new venue. Judge Marker believed NOAH's was unable to restructure its debt and operate effectively, adding: "This company is hurting people and I'm not going to allow that to continue."

The judge and US Trustee managing their restructuring case converted Noah's event venue from Chapter 11 to Chapter 7 bankruptcy case.

In December 2020, the Securities and Exchange Commission charged Bowser and several associates with fraud for alleged misappropriation of funds from 2017 to 2019.

== Business model ==
NOAH's operated under a tenancy in common arrangement, allowing individuals to own discrete shares of real estate. Utah-based property broker Rockwell Debt-Free Properties Inc., or a subsidiary, also owned or managed by Bowser, generally acquires a property and leases it to Noah. Noah develops and builds the facilities through a construction arm, Gabriel Management Corp., again owned by Bowser, and then operates the venue. Rockwell sells interests in the property to small groups of investors. The investors collect rent from the sole tenant, Noah, through a property manager. Investors characterize these business practices a Ponzi scheme, which attorney's for Noah's have rejected. Many investors have sold other real estate, for a profit, and reinvested with NOAH's in order to defer capital gains taxes on their sale, in what NOAH's portrayed as a section 1031 exchange under IRS regulation.
