= Ted Stewart =

American judge (born 1948)

Senior Judge of the United States District Court for the District of Utah
- Incumbent
- Assumed office September 1, 2014

Chief Judge of the United States District Court for the District of Utah
- In office 2011–2014
- Preceded by: Tena Campbell
- Succeeded by: David Nuffer

Judge of the United States District Court for the District of Utah
- In office November 11, 1999 – September 1, 2014
- Appointed by: Bill Clinton
- Preceded by: John Thomas Greene Jr.
- Succeeded by: Howard C. Nielson Jr.

Personal details
- Born: Brian Theadore Stewart; 1948 (age 77–78) Logan, Utah, U.S.
- Relations: Chris Stewart (brother)
- Education: Utah State University (BS); University of Utah (JD)

Brian Theadore Stewart (born 1948) is a senior United States district judge of the United States District Court for the District of Utah.

== Early life and education ==
Stewart was born in Logan, Utah. He received a Bachelor of Science degree from Utah State University in 1972 and a Juris Doctor from the S.J. Quinney College of Law at the University of Utah.

== Career ==
From 1974 until 1980, Stewart worked in private legal practice in Salt Lake City. He then served as an assistant to Senator Orrin Hatch in 1980, and then worked as an administrative assistant to Congressman James V. Hansen from 1981 until 1985. From 1985 until 1992, Stewart was a commissioner on the Public Service Commission of Utah. From 1993 until 1998, Stewart served as the executive director of Utah's Department of Natural Resources. From 1998 until becoming a federal judge in 1999, Stewart served as a chief of staff to then-Utah Governor Mike Leavitt.

Stewart was a visiting professor at Utah State University in 1991 and from 1994 to 1998. He was also a visiting professor at Weber State University in 1997.

=== Federal judicial service ===
In mid-1999, President Bill Clinton nominated Stewart to federal district court to fill a seat vacated by Judge John Thomas Greene Jr., who assumed senior status in November 1997. Clinton, a Democrat, nominated Stewart, a Republican, because Stewart was a friend of Senator Orrin Hatch of Utah, and Hatch at that time was the chairman of the United States Senate Committee on the Judiciary. Clinton did so as a courtesy to Hatch, hoping the gesture would encourage Republican senators to act to confirm many of the president's languishing judicial nominees.

However, Hatch demanded that Stewart be confirmed before senators could consider other judicial nominees. That enraged Senate Democrats, who refused to allow for a vote on Stewart. That prompted Republican senators to take the then very rare move of filing for cloture on the nomination of a federal district judge. On September 21, 1999, Democrats unified to successfully filibuster Stewart's nomination, by a 55–44 vote on the Senate floor that may well have been the only successful filibuster ever on a federal district court nominee.

Two weeks later, Democratic and Republican senators announced a deal that paved the way for votes on the nominations of Stewart and two other judicial nominees. On October 5, 1999, the Senate confirmed Stewart by a 93–5 vote. Stewart received his judicial commission on November 11, 1999. He served as chief judge from 2011 to 2014. He assumed senior status on September 1, 2014.

=== Notable case ===
Stewart made the initial ruling in favor of the terms-of sale restrictions on the easement in the LDS plaza by the Salt Lake Temple.

On August 1, 2023, Stewart dismissed a lawsuit brought by the Free Speech Coalition against the state of Utah. The lawsuit claimed that a Utah law requiring an age verification system on websites containing pornography violated the First Amendment. The Free Speech Coalition stated that it would appeal Judge Stewart's ruling.

== Personal ==
Stewart is a member of The Church of Jesus Christ of Latter-day Saints. With his brother, Chris Stewart, he wrote the book Seven Miracles That Saved America: Why They Matter and Why We Should Have Hope, which was published in 2009, and the book The Miracle of Freedom: 7 Tipping Points that Saved the World, which was published in 2011. In 2017, he wrote the book Supreme Power: 7 Pivotal Supreme Court Decisions That Had a Major Impact on America.

Legal offices
Preceded by John Thomas Greene Jr.	Judge of the United States District Court for the District of Utah; 1999–2014	Succeeded by Howard C. Nielson Jr.
Preceded by Tena Campbell	Chief Judge of the United States District Court for the District of Utah; 2011–2014	Succeeded by David Nuffer
