= Paul G. Cassell =

American judge (born 1959)

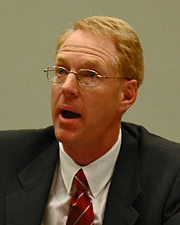

Judge of the United States District Court for the District of Utah
- In office May 15, 2002 – November 5, 2007
- Appointed by: George W. Bush
- Preceded by: David Sam
- Succeeded by: Clark Waddoups

Personal details
- Born: June 5, 1959 (age 67) Orange, California
- Education: Stanford University (BA, JD)

Paul George Cassell (born June 5, 1959) is a former United States district judge of the United States District Court for the District of Utah, who is currently the Ronald N. Boyce Presidential Professor of Criminal Law and University Distinguished Professor of Law at the S.J. Quinney College of Law at the University of Utah. He is best known as an expert in, and proponent of, victims' rights.

== Early life and articles ==
Born in Orange, California, in 1959, Cassell received a Bachelor of Arts degree from Stanford University in 1981. He later received a Juris Doctor from Stanford Law School in 1984 and served as President of the Stanford Law Review. He was also a law clerk for Antonin Scalia, then a judge on the United States Court of Appeals for the District of Columbia Circuit, from 1984 to 1985. He was a law clerk for Chief Justice Warren E. Burger from 1985 to 1986.

== Later career ==
=== US Attorney (1986-1991) ===
Cassell was an associate deputy attorney general in the United States Department of Justice from 1986 to 1988, and an Assistant United States Attorney for the Eastern District of Virginia from 1988 to 1991.

=== Professor of Law (1992-2002) ===
Cassell was a professor of law at the S.J. Quinney College of Law at the University of Utah from 1992 to 2002 and since 2007.

=== Federal judge (2002-2007) ===
On September 4, 2001, Cassell was nominated by President George W. Bush to a seat on the United States District Court for the District of Utah vacated by David Sam. Cassell was confirmed by the United States Senate on May 13, 2002, and received his commission on May 15, 2002. While serving as a judge, Cassell wrote several opinions that received widespread attention, including the first detailed district court opinion to declare the federal sentencing guidelines unconstitutional and a lengthy opinion decrying a 55-year mandatory minimum prison sentence he was compelled to impose for a low-level drug dealer, Weldon Angelos. Cassell later wrote a letter to President Obama requesting a sentence commutation, and thereafter prosecutors agreed to release Angelos. In December 2020, President Trump granted Angelos a full pardon, citing Cassell's opinion. In 2005, Chief Justice Rehnquist appointed Cassell to serve as the Chair of the federal Judicial Conference's Committee on Criminal Law. On November 5, 2007, Cassell resigned his judicial position to return to teaching at the S.J. Quinney College of Law.

=== Professor of law (2008-present) ===
Cassell has been a leading spokesperson for protecting the rights of crime victims during the criminal justice process, and was involved in supporting Utah's Crime Victims' Rights Amendment, which was passed in 1994. In 1996, Cassell represented victims and surviving family members of the Oklahoma City bombing in efforts to obtain access to court proceedings.

In 2008, Cassell unsuccessfully appealed to the U.S. Court of Appeals for the Tenth Circuit, seeking crime victims' rights for Sue and Ken Antrobus, whose daughter was murdered in a massacre at the Trolley Square shopping center in Salt Lake City. The Tenth Circuit said that the issue was a "difficult" one, with one judge dissenting.

Also in 2008, Cassell obtained a decision from the U.S. Court of Appeals for the Fifth Circuit that the rights of victims of a 2005 BP oil refinery explosion in Texas City, Texas, were violated when prosecutors negotiated a plea bargain.

In 2012, Cassell successfully appealed to the U.S. Court of Appeals for the Fifth Circuit, obtaining a ruling that lead to a district court decision that affected community members from pollution discharges by CITGO were "victims" under the Crime Victims' Rights Act.

In 2014, Cassell argued on behalf of a child pornography victim ("Amy") before the United States Supreme Court, arguing that she should receive restitution.

In 2018, Cassell filed a petition on behalf of four "Jane Does" urging the Utah Supreme Court to appoint special prosecutors to pursue four rape cases. Cassell has testified before congressional committees several times, supporting an amendment to the United States Constitution protecting crime victims' rights.

In 2017 Cassell advocated on behalf of Marsy's Laws in various states.

Cassell is also a co-author of a law school casebook on crime victims' rights, Victims In Criminal Procedure.

Cassell is a proponent of capital punishment and has litigated for a victim's family in a death penalty case.

==== Jane Doe #1 and Jane Doe #2 v. United States (Epstein) ====
Cassell was part of the legal team in a lawsuit against the United States by several alleged victims of registered sex offender Jeffrey Epstein, arguing that the government illegally concealed its non-prosecution agreement with Epstein from the victims in violation of their rights under the Crime Victims' Rights Act.

A December 30, 2014 filing in a federal civil suit in Florida against the United States for violations of the Crime Victims' Rights Act alleged that the United States, in giving Epstein a plea bargain in 2008, violated his victims' rights under the Crime Victims' Rights Act. The filing accused Alan Dershowitz, a lawyer who represented Epstein in his 2008 plea deal, of sexually abusing a minor provided by Epstein. The United Kingdom's Prince Andrew is also alleged to have had sex with underage girls provided by Epstein. Both have denied the charges. Dershowitz threatened disbarment proceedings against Cassell and another lawyer on the alleged victim's legal team, challenging their filing on behalf of the victim. Cassell countered: "We carefully investigate all of the allegations in our pleadings before presenting them. We have also tried to depose Mr. Dershowitz on these subjects, although he has avoided those deposition requests." Cassell and another lawyer filed a defamation lawsuit. In the defamation countersuit brought by Dershowitz, Utah Attorney General Sean Reyes served as counsel for Cassell, assisting with deposition preparation and strategy, and attending the January 2016 deposition in Fort Lauderdale, Florida. The case ultimately settled on confidential terms.

Ultimately, following years of litigation, the Jane Doe #1 and Jane Doe #2 lawsuit led US District Court judge Kenneth Marra to rule in February 2019 that federal prosecutors had violated the victims' rights in concealing the Epstein plea deal from the victims. But in September 2019, the district court dismissed the lawsuit as moot in the wake of Epstein's apparent suicide.

Cassell and co-counsel Brad Edwards appealed to the U.S. Court of Appeals for the Eleventh Circuit, which in April 2020 handed down a split decision, spanning 120 pages, rejecting the appeal on the grounds that the crime victims never had any rights under the Crime Victims' Rights Act because prosecutors had never filed federal charges against Epstein. Cassell and Edwards filed a petition for rehearing en banc, which the Eleventh Circuit granted in August 2020. In April 2021, the Eleventh Circuit en banc ruled 8-5 that the Crime Victims Rights Act does not extend rights to victims in federal cases before charges are formally filed. The case is archived as "Doe No. 1 v. United States, 749 F. 3d 999 (11th Cir. 2014)".

The Supreme Court, which was petitioned in August 2021, in February 2022 denied review in the case.

==== United States v. Boeing ====
Cassell has led a legal challenge to the deferred prosecution agreement between the Justice Department and Boeing concerning the crashes of two 737 MAX aircraft. In December 2021, Cassell filed a motion for fifteen families who had family members killed in the Lion Air and Ethiopian airlines crashes. Cassell argued that the Justice Department had violated the Crime Victims Rights Act by failing to confer with the victims' families.

The Justice Department responded to the motion by arguing that the families did not represent "crime victims" under Act because the crime covered by the deferred prosecution agreement was Boeing lying to the Federal Aviation Administration; only the FAA was a victim.

On October 22, 2022, the judge handling the case agreed with Cassell and granted the motion. The judge concluded that the Boeing's crime of lying to the FAA had directly caused the two crashes and that the families thus represented "victims" of a crime.

On February 10, 2023, the judge ruled that even though the families' rights had been violated by the Justice Department secretly negotiating the deal, he could not award any remedy to the families.

Cassell appealed this ruling to the Fifth Circuit, which held oral argument on July 25, 2023.

On December 15, 2023, the Fifth Circuit overturned the district court's ruling that it could not award any remedy to enforce the CVRA, but held that any final decision on the proper remedy was "premature" until the Justice Department moved to dismiss charges under the CVRA.

On January 5, 2024, a doorplug blew off an Alaska Airlines 737 aircraft, revealing problems with Boeing's production processes. On May 14, 2024, the Department of Justice determined that Boeing had breached its obligations under the DPA to implement an effective compliance program with U.S. fraud laws—making Boeing subject to prosecution for the pending criminal charge filed earlier.

On July 7, 2024, the Department of Justice notified the judge handling the case that it had reached a plea agreement with Boeing to resolve the matter. Cassell filed objections to the plea agreement for victims' families and, on October 11, 2024, argued to the judge that he should reject the plea agreement because it failed to reflect the deaths from the two MAX crashes. The arguments were under advisement as of 3 September 2025, after Judge O'Connor heard arguments on the matter.

On December 5, 2024, Judge O’Connor rejected the plea agreement.

Thereafter, on May 29, 2025, the Justice Department announced that it had reached a new arrangement with Boeing, a non-prosecution agreement and an accompanying motion to dismiss the charges.

On behalf of a number of the victims’ families, Cassell argued against the NPA. The district court approved the NPA and Cassell’s appeals for the families to the Fifth Circuit were rejected.

== Views on law enforcement ==
Cassell has argued that state exclusionary rules, including the rule implied in the Utah Constitution, unfairly harm victims of crime. In 2017, Justice Lee of the Utah Supreme Court agreed with this view, citing Cassell, while the remaining justices did not reach the issue.

Cassell has recently defended proactive law enforcement investigation techniques, arguing that the 2016 Chicago homicide spike harmed many victims and was attributable to an "ACLU effect" restricting stop-and-frisk by Chicago police officers. While the argument has been disputed, then-Attorney General Jeff Sessions cited it as a well-founded analysis.

In 2020, Cassell argued that the "Minneapolis Effect" was responsible for the homicide and shooting spike that occurred beginning in the summer of 2020. His research paper contended that, following the murder of George Floyd during an arrest by a Minneapolis police officer, the ensuing anti-police protests caused law enforcement to reduce proactive policing, resulting in an increase in firearms assaults and homicides.

Cassell has also questioned the frequency with which innocent persons have been wrongfully convicted for crimes they did not commit, calling for close scrutiny of cases involving especially vulnerable defendants rather than a general approach to the issue.

Cassell has also successfully served as a defense attorney in several cases where police officers were charged with crimes.

== Challenges to the Miranda decision ==
Cassell has been a leading critic of the U.S. Supreme Court's decision in Miranda v. Arizona. In 2000, the Supreme Court invited Cassell to argue in defense of Dickerson v. United States, a decision by the U.S. Court of Appeals for the Fourth Circuit which had held that a federal statute had superseded the requirements of the decision. A majority of the Court ultimately rejected Cassell's argument, with Justices Scalia and Thomas dissenting to endorse the position. Cassell has published a detailed empirical analysis concerning the harmful effects of the Miranda decision, including a lengthy 2017 co-authored law review article containing regression analysis linking declining crime clearance rates after the Miranda decision to the restrictions imposed on police.

== Published works ==
=== Books ===
- Debating the Death Penalty (2004)
- Victims in Criminal Procedure (5th edition)

=== Selected articles ===
- “The Crime Victims' Rights Movement: Historical Foundations, Modern Ascendancy, and Future Aspirations,” 56 U. Pac. L. Rev. 387 (2025).
- "In Defense of Victim Impact Statements", Ohio State Journal of Criminal Law, Vol. 6, No. 611, 2009.
- "Barbarians at the Gates? A Reply to the Critics of the Victims' Rights Amendment", Utah Law Review, 1999.
- "The Victims' Rights Amendment: A Sympathetic, Clause-by-Clause Analysis"
- "Freeing the Guilty Without Protecting the Innocent: Some Skeptical Observations on Proposed New "Innocence" Procedures", New York Law School Law Review, 2011.
- "The Guilty and the 'Innocent': An Examination of Alleged Cases of Wrongful Conviction from False Confessions". Harvard Journal of Law and Public Policy, Vol. 22, Spring 1999.
- "What Caused the 2016 Chicago Homicide Spike? An Empirical Examination of the "ACLU Effect" and the Role of Stop and Frisks in Preventing Gun Violence". University of Illinois Law Review, 2018.
- "Still Handcuffing the Cops? A Review of Fifty Years of Empirical Evidence of Miranda's Harmful Effects on Law Enforcement". 97 Bost. U.L. Rev. 685 (2017).
- "Miranda's Social Costs: An Empirical Reassessment". Northwestern University Law Review, Vol. 90, No. 2, 1996.

== See also ==
- List of law clerks for the chief justice of the United States

Legal offices
| Preceded by David Sam | Judge of the United States District Court for the District of Utah; 2002–2007 | Succeeded by Clark Waddoups |
