= Dee Benson =

American judge (1948–2020)

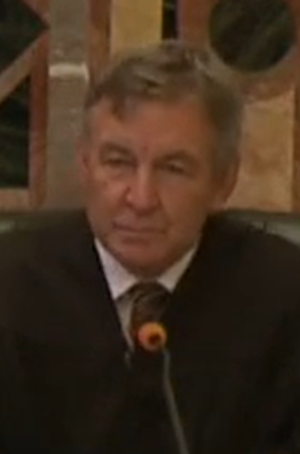

Senior Judge of the United States District Court for the District of Utah
- In office January 1, 2014 – November 30, 2020

Judge of the United States Foreign Intelligence Surveillance Court
- In office April 8, 2004 – April 7, 2011
- Appointed by: William Rehnquist
- Preceded by: John Edwards Conway
- Succeeded by: F. Dennis Saylor IV

Chief Judge of the United States District Court for the District of Utah
- In office 1999–2006
- Preceded by: David Sam
- Succeeded by: Tena Campbell

Judge of the United States District Court for the District of Utah
- In office September 16, 1991 – January 1, 2014
- Appointed by: George H. W. Bush
- Preceded by: Seat established by 104 Stat. 5089
- Succeeded by: Jill Parrish

United States Attorney for the District of Utah
- In office 1989–1991
- Appointed by: George H. W. Bush
- Preceded by: Brent D. Ward
- Succeeded by: David J. Jordan

Personal details
- Born: Dee Vance Benson; August 25, 1948 Sandy, Utah, U.S.
- Died: November 30, 2020 (aged 72) Sandy, Utah, U.S.
- Education: Brigham Young University (BA, JD)

Dee Vance Benson (August 25, 1948 – November 30, 2020) was an American jurist who served as a United States district judge of the United States District Court for the District of Utah. He was nominated as judge by President George H. W. Bush on May 16, 1991, and confirmed by the United States Senate on September 12, 1991. In May 2004, Chief Justice William Rehnquist appointed Benson to serve as a judge of the Foreign Intelligence Surveillance Court for a seven-year term.

Benson was born in Sandy, Utah and graduated from Jordan High School. In 1973, he received a Bachelor of Arts degree from Brigham Young University (BYU) and a Juris Doctor as a member of the charter class of the J. Reuben Clark Law School at BYU in 1976. That year he also played professional soccer with the Utah Golden Spikers of the American Soccer League.

From 1976 to 1984, Benson practiced law in private practice. He was a Counsel, U.S. Senate Committee on the Judiciary, Subcommittee on the Constitution from 1984 to 1986. He was a Chief of staff, U.S. Sen. Orrin Hatch from 1986 to 1988. He was a Counsel, Iran-Contra Congressional Investigating Committee in 1987. He was an Associate deputy U.S. attorney general from 1988 to 1989. He was a U.S. Attorney for the District of Utah from 1989 to 1991.

Benson was a federal judge to the United States District Court for the District of Utah. He was nominated by President George H. W. Bush on May 16, 1991, to a new seat created by 104 Stat. 5089. He was confirmed by the United States Senate on September 12, 1991, and received his commission on September 16, 1991. He served as chief judge of the district from 1999 until 2006. He took senior status on January 1, 2014, and died of brain cancer in 2020, at his home, in Sandy, Utah.

== Early life and education ==
Benson is of Swedish ancestry. He was born, along with his identical twin brother, Lee Benson, on August 25, 1948, in Sandy, Utah. After graduating from Jordan High School, Benson served an LDS mission in Sweden. Benson then attended BYU in Provo, Utah, where he received a Bachelor of Arts degree in 1973, majoring in Physical Education with a minor in political science. That same year, Benson became a member of the charter class at the J. Reuben Clark Law School at BYU. While in law school, he served as the editor for the BYU Law Review. Benson went on to receive his Juris Doctor in the spring of 1976.

In addition to his legal studies, Benson played professionally in the American Soccer League which has since been disbanded. He was a member of Utah's team, The Golden Spikers for the 1976 year. He later stated that it made him "realize that I didn't have a future in professional soccer." With soccer as a passion and an affinity for teaching, Benson started and coached the first soccer team at Hillcrest High School in Midvale, Utah.

== Career ==
Upon graduation from BYU, Benson accepted a position with a Salt Lake City firm then known as Martineau & Maak where he stayed less than one year. He was then offered and accepted a position as a litigator with the firm Snow Christensen & Martineau, where he remained until 1984.

During his eight-year tenure at Snow Christensen, Benson took a two-year leave of absence to accept a position with the construction company Ralph M. Parsons Company based in Pasadena, California. With Ralph M. Parsons, he lived in a developing Saudi Arabian city known today as Yanbu. His duties as legal counsel for Parsons included reviewing contracts as well as handling lawsuits that arose with general contractors and employees.

From 1984 through 1989, Benson served in various U.S. government posts in Washington, D.C., including:

- Counsel to the U.S. Senate Committee on the Judiciary, Subcommittee on the Constitution from 1984 to 1986 – Notable issues that arose during his employment included The Balanced Budget Amendment.
- Chief of Staff to Senator Orrin Hatch from 1986 to 1988
- Counsel to the Iran-Contra Congressional Investigating Committee 1987, where he helped write the minority report with Dick Cheney.
- Associate Deputy Attorney General to Deputy Attorney General Harold G. Christensen; Christensen was his former senior partner at Snow Christensen

In 1989, Benson was appointed United States attorney for the District of Utah. He was recommended to the post by his former boss, Senator Orrin Hatch to replace U.S. attorney Brent Ward. Benson's recommendation was further supported by Senator Jake Garn and by United States Attorney General Richard Thornburgh. He was sworn in under an interim appointment on March 7, 1989. He received a presidential nomination from President George H. W. Bush and confirmation by the United States Senate before being sworn in on August 8, 1989. Benson held this post until 1991.

Benson also held adjunct law school professorships at Brigham Young University's J. Reuben Clark Law School and the University of Utah's S.J. Quinney College of Law, where he taught courses on criminal trial practice and evidence.

=== Federal judicial service ===
In May 1991, Benson was nominated for a federal judgeship to the United States District Court by President George H. W. Bush. This seat was new for Utah, created by Congress in 1990, along with 84 others throughout the country. Benson was confirmed by the Senate and began serving on September 16, 1991. He held the position of Chief Judge of the District Court from 1999 to 2007.

Through his appointment in 2004 to the Foreign Intelligence Surveillance Court in Washington, D.C., Benson traveled to the nation's capital every 10 weeks to participate in court sessions. He served in this capacity until 2011 when his seven-year term expired.

Mike Lee, Republican U.S. Senator since 2010 from Utah, served as a law clerk to Judge Benson in 1997.

=== Notable decisions ===
In 2011, Judge Benson sentenced eco-activist Tim DeChristopher to two years in prison for disrupting an oil auction in 2008. Benson had barred DeChristopher's defense team from explaining to the jury why he disrupted the auction. Critics have accused Judge Benson for doling a harsh sentence to DeChristopher. Peter Yarrow, folk singer and member of Peter, Paul, and Mary, wrote in an editorial for the Los Angeles Times, that DeChristopher's actions were comparable to leaders of the civil rights movement.

"Tim is a hero to me," wrote Yarrow. "Throughout American history, acts of civil disobedience have led to change. Think about the Underground Railroad that helped escaped slaves to freedom, or about the courageous actions of people like Rosa Parks, who refused to stay in the back of the bus simply because of their skin color. Without this kind of defiance of unjust laws, our country would likely still be denying people of colour basic freedoms."

In 2012, Judge Benson denied convicted felon Dewey MacKay's request to remain free pending appeal of his guilty verdict. However, Judge Benson, without objection from the prosecution, did allow MacKay to remain free pending appeal of Benson's denial. MacKay, an orthopedic surgeon from northern Utah, was convicted in August 2011 of 40 counts related to illegally prescribing pain killers. Between 2005 and 2009 MacKay prescribed over 3.5 million pills of opiate painkillers. During the appeal hearing, Benson said that the jury's verdict had sufficient evidence, but expressed sympathy towards MacKay and his family and stating that the 20-year mandatory minimum sentence issued by Benson was "too long'. "It's very easy to get almost teary-eyed over the health issue alone," Benson said. "This is so hard for people who love and admire and respect this man, which is many." Benson told MacKay's family that he "can't even imagine" the "nightmare" they are going through. "It must be like a black cloud," he said. He said that America's jury system is not perfect, but added that jurors in MacKay's case performed their jobs diligently. MacKay's attorney's used his failing health and large numbers of prescription drugs he takes as reasons why MacKay should stay out of prison.

== Publication ==
Benson is the co-author of a textbook on evidence, described by online retailer West Thomson as follows: "This treatise examines each article of the Utah Rules of Evidence in a practitioner-friendly format. The current language and relevant legislative history for each article is presented, followed by checklists and an analytical overview of the Utah case law and United States Supreme Court cases interpreting each evidentiary rule. Differences that may exist between the state and federal rules of evidence are also outlined."

== Selected rulings ==
Impact Energy Resources, LLC, et al. vs. Ken Salazar, et al.: Case No. 2:09-cv-435 and 2:09-cv-440. This lawsuit was filed by three energy companies along with the Utah counties of Carbon, Uintah and Duchene against Interior Secretary Ken Salazar and related federal authorities. The case involved 77 gas and oil drilling leases that were cancelled by Secretary Salazar in February 2009. The plaintiffs sought to overturn the action by Secretary Salazar. Judge Benson ruled in favor of Salazar because the lawsuit was not filed within the statute of limitations mandating the filing of any challenge within 90 days of the Secretary's decision. He did, however, acknowledge that, "In this case, the secretary exceeded his statutory authority by withdrawing leases after determining which parcels were to be leased and after holding a competitive lease sale." Also in his ruling Judge Benson stated, "The plain language of the Mineral Leasing Act mandates the Secretary of Interior to accept bids and issues leases as part of the competitive leasing process for oil and gas leases. Ultimately though, the plaintiff's claims are time barred."

The United States of America vs. Tim DeChristopher: Case No. 2:09-CR-183. Tim DeChristopher was indicted in U.S. Federal District Court for bidding on Federal energy leases without intent to pay for them. He claimed that he did so as an act of civil disobedience. In March, 2011, after a four-day jury trial, DeChristopher was convicted and "faces up to five years on each of the two counts — disrupting a federal auction and making false statements on federal forms to enter the auction — and up to $750,000 in total fines. Sentencing was set for June 23. ... Judge ... Benson strictly limited how much the defense could say about federal energy policies and climate change, which Mr. DeChristopher has said in numerous interviews were his primary motivations in going to the auction." The prosecutor in the case was Assistant United States Attorney Scott B. Romney. On July 26, 2011, Benson sentenced DeChristopher to two years in prison and a fine of $10,000.

The Salt Lake Tribune, et al. vs. Elaine Chao, The U.S. Secretary of Labor, et al.: Case No. 2:07-cv-739. This suit was commenced by several Utah media organizations seeking access to documents relating to the Crandall Canyon mine collapse that killed six miners and three rescue workers in Utah. In dismissing the complaint, Judge Benson noted that, "It is not this court's or any other court's role to make law, only to interpret it." Plaintiffs contended that public access to the investigation would help insure accuracy. Judge Benson stated in his ruling, "The court finds many of these policy arguments persuasive," Benson wrote, but said it was not his place to make such decisions. "While it may be true that requiring all government investigations to be open would result in greater accountability and more accurate information, if such a requirement is to be imposed, it must come from a statute that is debated and passed by Congress and signed into law by the president."

Summum vs. Duchesne City, et al.: Case No. 2:03-cv-1049. Summum is a religious group that sued the City of Pleasant Grove, Utah for the right to install a monolith containing their core beliefs next to an existing monolith of the Ten Commandments. The group contended that their First Amendment Rights were violated by the existence of the Ten Commandments monument. Judge Benson ruled against the group, holding their right to free speech had not been violated. The case was then appealed and heard by the Tenth Circuit Court who overturned Judge Benson's previous decision. Rather than allow Summum to place their monolith, the City of Pleasant Grove removed the Ten Commandments monolith. The case was then accepted and heard by The Supreme Court of the United States. The Court issued a unanimous ruling (No. 07-665) in favor of the city of Pleasant Grove No. 07–665 on February 25, 2009. The court found that monuments that were privately funded were considered government speech and therefore not in violation of any one group's First Amendment rights. In his opinion, Justice Samuel Alito analogized that, if the law accorded with Summum and its "civil liberties" supporters, New York City would have been required to accept a Statue of Autocracy from the German Empire or Imperial Russia when it accepted the Statue of Liberty from France.

Caldera vs. Microsoft: Case No. 2:96-cv-645 B. This case mirrored the much larger anti-trust case against Microsoft in Washington D.C. Utah based Caldera, Inc. brought the anti-trust suit against Microsoft for the anti-competitive practice of encoding Microsoft Windows 95 to only run properly if MS-DOS, a Microsoft product, was being used. Caldera's claim was that this practice unfairly inhibited the competition by eliminating DR-DOS as an alternative. Judge Benson denied 4 Motions for Summary Judgment by Microsoft to have the case dismissed. The case was eventually settled by the parties.

Legal offices
Preceded by Seat established by 104 Stat. 5089	Judge of the United States District Court for the District of Utah; 1991–2014	Succeeded by Jill Parrish
Preceded by David Sam	Chief Judge of the United States District Court for the District of Utah; 1999–2006	Succeeded by Tena Campbell
Preceded by John Edwards Conway	Judge of the United States Foreign Intelligence Surveillance Court; 2004–2011	Succeeded by F. Dennis Saylor IV
