= John A. Pearce =

American judge (born 1969)

John Pearce

Justice of the Utah Supreme Court
- In office January 29, 2016 – December 1, 2025
- Appointed by: Gary Herbert
- Preceded by: Jill Parrish
- Succeeded by: John Nielsen

Personal details
- Born: June 6, 1969 (age 56) Magna, Utah, U.S.
- Spouse: Jennifer Napier
- Education: University of Utah (BS); University of California, Berkeley (JD)

John A. Pearce (born June 6, 1969) is a Utah judge, appointed to the Utah Supreme Court in November, 2015 by Governor Gary Herbert. The Utah Senate later confirmed Pearce in a 21–0 vote in December 2015 and he was sworn in on January 29, 2016. He retired from the court in December 2025.

Prior to being confirmed to the Utah Supreme Court, Pearce served on the Utah Court of Appeals. He has also served as general counsel in Governor Herbert's office. Pearce was born and raised in Magna, Utah and began his legal career as an associate at Wilson Sonsini Goodrich & Rosati. Later, Pearce was a shareholder at Jones Waldo in Salt Lake City. Justice Pearce graduated from Cyprus High in Magna, got an undergraduate degree from the University of Utah in economics, and received his Juris Doctor from the University of California, Berkeley. Pearce also served as an adjunct professor at the University of Utah S.J. Quinney College of Law.

Legal offices
Preceded by Jill Parrish	Justice of the Utah Supreme Court; 2016–2025	Succeeded by John Nielsen
