= Aldon J. Anderson =

American judge

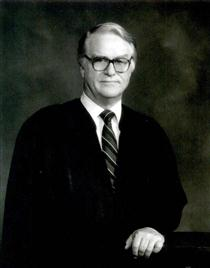

Senior Judge of the United States District Court for the District of Utah
- In office December 20, 1984 – March 24, 1996

Chief Judge of the United States District Court for the District of Utah
- In office 1978–1984
- Preceded by: Willis William Ritter
- Succeeded by: Bruce Sterling Jenkins

Judge of the United States District Court for the District of Utah
- In office July 22, 1971 – December 20, 1984
- Appointed by: Richard Nixon
- Preceded by: Albert Sherman Christensen
- Succeeded by: David Sam

Personal details
- Born: Aldon Junior Anderson; January 3, 1917 Salt Lake City, Utah
- Died: March 24, 1996 (aged 79) Salt Lake City, Utah
- Education: University of Utah (B.A.); S.J. Quinney College of Law (J.D.)

Aldon Junior Anderson (January 3, 1917 – March 24, 1996) was a United States district judge of the United States District Court for the District of Utah.

== Education and career ==
Born on January 3, 1917, in Salt Lake City, Utah, to Aldon J. and Minnie (Egan), Anderson received a Bachelor of Arts degree from the University of Utah in 1939 and a Juris Doctor from the S.J. Quinney College of Law at the University of Utah in 1943. He was a staff attorney of the Utah State Tax Commission from 1943 to 1945, and was then in private practice in Salt Lake City until 1957, also working as a Utah state district attorney from 1953 to 1957. He was a judge of the second district of the Utah State District Court from 1957 to 1971.

== Federal judicial service ==
On June 17, 1971, President Richard Nixon nominated Anderson to a seat on the United States District Court for the District of Utah vacated by Judge Albert Sherman Christensen. Anderson was confirmed by the United States Senate on July 22, 1971, and received his commission the same day. He served as Chief Judge from 1978 to 1984, assuming senior status on December 20, 1984. Anderson served in this capacity until his death on March 24, 1996, in Salt Lake City.

== Personal ==
Anderson was married to Virginia Weilenmann Anderson, who was a speech therapist for disabled people.

== Sources ==
Legal offices
| Preceded by Albert Sherman Christensen | Judge of the United States District Court for the District of Utah; 1971–1984 | Succeeded by David Sam |
| Preceded by Willis William Ritter | Chief Judge of the United States District Court for the District of Utah; 1978–1984 | Succeeded by Bruce Sterling Jenkins |
