= List of United States federal courthouses in Utah =

Following is a list of current and former courthouses of the United States federal court system located in Utah. Each entry indicates the name of the building along with an image, if available, its location and the jurisdiction it covers, the dates during which it was used for each such jurisdiction, and, if applicable the person for whom it was named, and the date of renaming. Dates of use will not necessarily correspond with the dates of construction or demolition of a building, as pre-existing structures may be adapted or court use, and former court buildings may later be put to other uses. Also, the official name of the building may be changed at some point after its use as a federal court building has been initiated.

== Courthouses ==
Courthouse	City	Image	Street address	Jurisdiction	Dates of use	Named for
U.S. Post Office and Courthouse^{†}	Ogden		298 East 24th Street	D. Utah	1909–1965; Now privately owned.	n/a
James V. Hansen Federal Building	Ogden		324 East 25th Street	D. Utah	1965–?	U.S. Rep. James V. Hansen (2004)
Frank E. Moss U.S. Courthouse	Salt Lake City		350 South Main Street	D. Utah	1905–present	U.S. Sen. Frank E. Moss (1990)
Orrin G. Hatch U.S. Courthouse	Salt Lake City		351 South West Temple Street	D. Utah	2014–present	U.S. Sen. Orrin Hatch (2020)

== Key ==
^{†}	Listed on the National Register of Historic Places (NRHP)

== See also ==
- List of United States federal courthouses
