= Bruce Sterling Jenkins =

American judge (1927–2023)

Bruce Jenkins
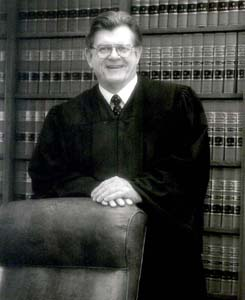

Senior Judge of the United States District Court for the District of Utah
- In office September 30, 1994 – November 7, 2023

Chief Judge of the United States District Court for the District of Utah
- In office 1984–1993
- Preceded by: Aldon J. Anderson
- Succeeded by: David Kent Winder

Judge of the United States District Court for the District of Utah
- In office September 22, 1978 – September 30, 1994
- Appointed by: Jimmy Carter
- Preceded by: Willis William Ritter
- Succeeded by: Tena Campbell

Member of the Utah Senate
- In office 1959–1965

Personal details
- Born: May 27, 1927 Salt Lake City, Utah, U.S.
- Died: November 7, 2023 (aged 96) Salt Lake City, Utah, U.S.
- Education: University of Utah (BA, JD)

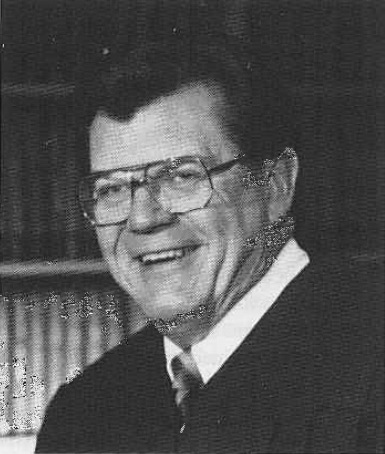

Bruce Sterling Jenkins (May 27, 1927 – November 7, 2023) was an American attorney, politician, and jurist who served as a United States district judge of the United States District Court for the District of Utah from 1978 to 2023.

== Personal life ==
Born in Salt Lake City, Utah on May 27, 1927, Jenkins was in the United States Navy from 1945 to 1946, and then received a Bachelor of Arts degree from the University of Utah in 1949 and a Juris Doctor from the S.J. Quinney College of Law in 1952.

Jenkins died on November 6, 2023, at the age of 96.

== Career ==
Jenkins was in private practice in Salt Lake City from 1952 to 1965. He was an assistant state attorney general of Utah in 1952, and a deputy county attorney of Salt Lake County, Utah from 1954 to 1958. He was a member of the Utah State Senate from 1959 to 1965, serving as a Democrat. Jenkins served on the federal bench for more than four decades, including nearly three decades in active service before assuming senior status, making him one of the longest serving federal judges in Utah. In 1965, Jenkins became a Referee in Bankruptcy for the District of Utah, and from 1973 to 1978 he was a United States Bankruptcy Judge for that district.

=== Federal judicial service ===
On August 28, 1978, Jenkins was nominated by President Jimmy Carter to a seat on the United States District Court for the District of Utah vacated by Judge Willis William Ritter. Jenkins was confirmed by the United States Senate on September 20, 1978, and received his commission on September 22, 1978. He served as chief judge from 1984 to 1993, and also taught as an adjunct professor, University of Utah from 1987 to 1988. He assumed senior status on September 30, 1994.

== See also ==
- List of United States federal judges by longevity of service

== Sources ==
Legal offices
Preceded by Willis William Ritter	Judge of the United States District Court for the District of Utah; 1978–1994	Succeeded by Tena Campbell
Preceded by Aldon J. Anderson	Chief Judge of the United States District Court for the District of Utah; 1984–1993	Succeeded by David Kent Winder
