= United States Bankruptcy Court for the District of Utah =

The United States Bankruptcy Court for the District of Utah is the United States bankruptcy court in Utah. It is associated with the United States District Court for the District of Utah. The court is based in Salt Lake City with an additional courtroom available (as needed) in Ogden.

The court has three bankruptcy judges, which Congress increased from two in 1986. If all parties consent, appeals of a bankruptcy judge's decision may be taken to the Bankruptcy Appellate Panel for the 10th Circuit, created in 1996. Otherwise appeals are taken to the district court.

Like other U.S. bankruptcy courts, the court was established in its modern form in 1984, although some form of federal bankruptcy adjudication had taken place in the district since the Bankruptcy Act of 1898. From the 1990s to the early 2000s, the court saw a sharp increase in the number of consumer bankruptcies. In 2004, Utah had the nation's highest number of bankruptcies relative to number of households.
