= Lee Benson =

American journalist

Lee Benson (born August 25, 1948) is an American known for his long association with the Deseret News. He began his career as a sports journalist and has covered at least nine Olympic Games for the paper, before moving on to emphasize general news and often covering Mormon issues.

Benson is a 1976 graduate of Brigham Young University. He has been sports editor of the Deseret News and as of the beginning of 2012 was a columnist for the news who wrote on metro-Salt Lake City issues.

Benson was born in Sandy, Utah. His twin brother, Dee Benson, was a former chief judge for the United States District Court for the State of Utah.

== Books ==
Benson has written or co-written several non-ficiton books on a range of topics.

He co-authored a 2006 book with James W. Parkinson titled Solder Slaves about American prisoners of war of Imperial Japan during World War II and their attempts to obtain reparations.

Benson is the author of And They Came to Pass, a book about Brigham Young University's string of successful quarterbacks under the coaching dynasty of LaVell Edwards. Benson co-authored In Plain Sight: The Startling Truth Behind the Elizabeth Smart investigation with Tom Smart, the uncle of Elizabeth Smart, who was kidnapped from her family's home in a high-profile 2002 case.

His 1997 book Blind Trust discussed the short, scandal-plagued term of Enid Greene, who was the first woman elected to the House of Representatives from Utah.

He co-authored golfer Billy Casper's 2012 autobiography, The Big Three And Me, with Casper and James Parkinson.

== Sources ==
- "Lee Benson in Athens". Deseret News. Salt Lake City. August 9, 2004. Archived from the original on October 23, 2012 – via HighBeam Research.
- Deseret Book bio of Benson
