= Robert J. Shelby =

American judge (born 1970)

Robert Shelby
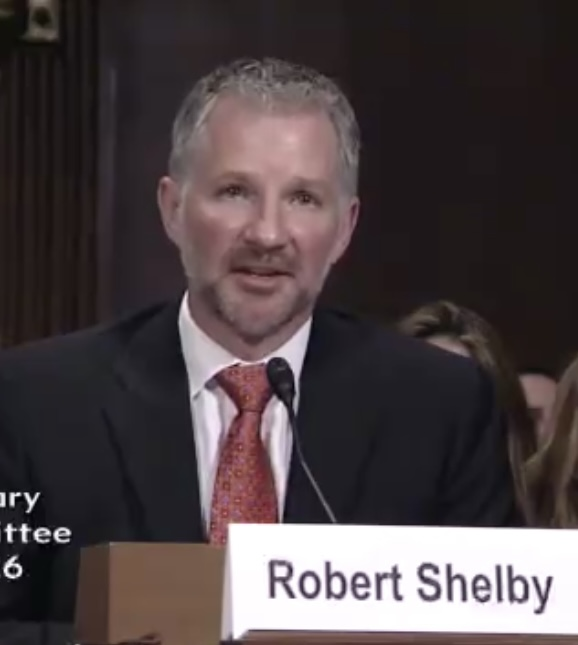

Chief Judge of the United States District Court for the District of Utah
- In office October 1, 2018 – October 1, 2025
- Preceded by: David Nuffer
- Succeeded by: Jill Parrish

Judge of the United States District Court for the District of Utah
- Incumbent
- Assumed office September 25, 2012
- Appointed by: Barack Obama
- Preceded by: Tena Campbell

Personal details
- Born: Robert James Shelby; March 13, 1970 (age 56) Fort Atkinson, Wisconsin, U.S.
- Party: Republican
- Education: Utah State University (BA); University of Virginia (JD)

Military service
- Allegiance: United States
- Branch/service: United States Army • Utah Army National Guard
- Years of service: 1988–1996
- Rank: Specialist 4
- Unit: 19th Special Forces Group, 1457th Engineer Battalion
- Battles/wars: Gulf War • Operation Desert Storm
- Awards: Army Achievement Medal; National Defense Service Medal

Robert James Shelby (born March 13, 1970) is an American attorney and judge serving as a United States district judge of the United States District Court for the District of Utah.

== Early life, military service, and education ==
Shelby was born in Fort Atkinson, Wisconsin. He served in the 19th Special Forces Group, 1457th Engineer Battalion of the Utah Army National Guard from 1988 to 1996, and was on active duty during Operation Desert Storm in 1991. He received several military awards for his service, including the United States Army Achievement Medal for Desert Storm and the National Defense Service Medal. He was honorably discharged with the rank of specialist. He received his Bachelor of Arts degree in 1994 from Utah State University and his Juris Doctor in 1998 from the University of Virginia School of Law.

== Career ==
In 1999, he served as a law clerk for Judge John Thomas Greene Jr. of the United States District Court for the District of Utah. He was an associate at Snow, Christensen & Martineau in Salt Lake City from 2000 to 2005. From 2005 to 2011, he was an associate at Burbridge, Mitchell & Gross. From 2011 to 2012, he again practiced at Snow, Christensen & Martineau as a shareholder. His practice focused on complex commercial litigation and catastrophic personal injury cases on behalf of both plaintiffs and defendants. Shelby served on the Salt Lake County Bar Association's Executive Committee since 2002, and as its vice chairman since 2011. He served on the Utah Supreme Court's Advisory Committee on Rules of Civil Procedure and its Ethics and Discipline Committee. He is a registered Republican.

=== Federal judicial service ===
On November 30, 2011, President Barack Obama nominated Shelby to be district judge of the United States District Court for the District of Utah, to the seat vacated by Judge Tena Campbell, who assumed senior status on January 1, 2011. He received a hearing before the Senate Judiciary Committee on March 28, 2012, and his nomination was reported to the floor on April 26, 2012, by voice vote. Both Senators from Utah, Orrin Hatch and Mike Lee, endorsed his nomination, with Sen. Lee describing Shelby as "pre-eminently qualified" and predicting that he would be "an outstanding judge." Hatch highly lauded Shelby: "A man of keen intellect, Robert Shelby...has demonstrated an unwavering commitment to the law". In the early hours of September 22, 2012, on what was officially still the legislative day of September 21, the Senate confirmed Shelby in a voice vote. He received his commission on September 25, 2012. He became chief judge on October 1, 2018.

=== Notable decisions ===
- On December 20, 2013, Shelby struck down Amendment 3 of Utah’s State Constitution, which defined marriage as a union solely between a man and a woman, opening the way for same-sex marriage in the state. He found that Amendment 3 was in violation of the U.S. Constitution’s 14th Amendment, which guarantees due process and equal protection. This highly significant ruling set off a series of other district court decisions that overturned bans in several other states. His ruling was affirmed by the Tenth Circuit Court of Appeals on June 25, 2014. On October 6, 2014, the U.S. Supreme Court declined the review the Tenth Circuit's ruling, legalizing same-sex marriage in Utah.
- On September 10, 2024, he would enjoin the Utah Social Media Regulation Act for violating the first amendment.
- On April 17, 2025, Shelby dismissed a lawsuit filed in October 2023 accusing The Church of Jesus Christ of Latter-day Saints of fraud in its handling of tithing funds, primarily due to the plaintiffs missing the three-year statute of limitations after the information regarding the church's financial holdings became public in late 2019 and early 2020.

Legal offices
Preceded by Tena Campbell	Judge of the United States District Court for the District of Utah; 2012–present	Incumbent
Preceded by David Nuffer	Chief Judge of the United States District Court for the District of Utah; 2018–2025	Succeeded by Jill Parrish
