= Aslaug Haviland =

Norwegian-American motivational speaker (1913–2003)

Haviland in 1963

Aslaug Haviland (January 19, 1913 – January 6, 2003), known as "Utah's Helen Keller" was a deaf and blind Norwegian woman who came to the United States at the age of 16 to attend the Perkins Institute in Boston, Massachusetts. She became a nationally renowned motivational speaker.

== Biography ==
Aslaug Haviland was born in Bergen, Norway, on January 19, 1913. At age 12 she contracted scarlet fever, and as a result lost both her hearing and vision. Little is known about her early life except that after the loss of her hearing she first attended Norway's school for the deaf, where she learned sign language, and later went on to attend the Royal School for the Blind. At the age of 16, Haviland's family was able to save up enough money to send her to the Perkins School for the Blind. There was not, however, enough money for anyone to travel with her, so Haviland traveled alone by boat to Boston. She recorded that all of the individuals on the boat, including the captain, looked after her. Even though she was ill for both the journey and most of her time in Boston, Haviland had a great desire to learn English. Though Haviland returned to Norway after her studies at the Perkins School for the Blind had finished, she eventually was able to teach herself English.

Haviland married and had a son, George. In 1952 she, her husband Arne, and her son immigrated to Winnipeg, Manitoba, Canada. Aslaug and her son joined the Church of Jesus Christ of Latter-day Saints in Norway, and in 1958 after the death of her husband, she and George immigrated to the United States and traveled to Utah.

Haviland moved to Murray, and over time became known as "Utah's Helen Keller". Haviland was a popular speaker in Utah and the west coast, giving both motivational speeches and training on handicaps and rehabilitation. Haviland spoke to the general public at open meetings, but also to professional and government organizations, including both the Governor's Advisory Council for the Visually Handicapped and the Coordinating Council of Organizations and Agencies Serving the Blind at their 1974 conference at Brigham Young University. Haviland was also heavily involved in planning and implementing job training programs for the deaf and blind.

Despite her double handicap, Haviland strove for independence and had a strong desire to learn new things. In 1977 she was given a scholarship to attend a nine-week ceramics class at the Salt Lake Art Center school. The class was designed specifically for the blind, and Haviland was named one of the "star pupils".

Haviland's son George would go on to graduate from the University of Utah and serve an LDS mission in Denmark. He worked as an admissions counselor at BYU.

Haviland was made an American citizen in 1964. Though federal Judge A. Sherman Christensen offered to waive the repetition of the oath of citizenship, Haviland requested to be able to participate in the ceremony. Senator Wallace F. Bennett reported that it was "one of 1964's most unusual naturalization cases". An arrangement was made by which as the judge read the oath, a friend of Haviland's translated it into sign language and tapped it out into Haviland's palm.

Haviland died in Utah on January 6, 2003, at the age of 89.
