= Trina A. Higgins =

American lawyer

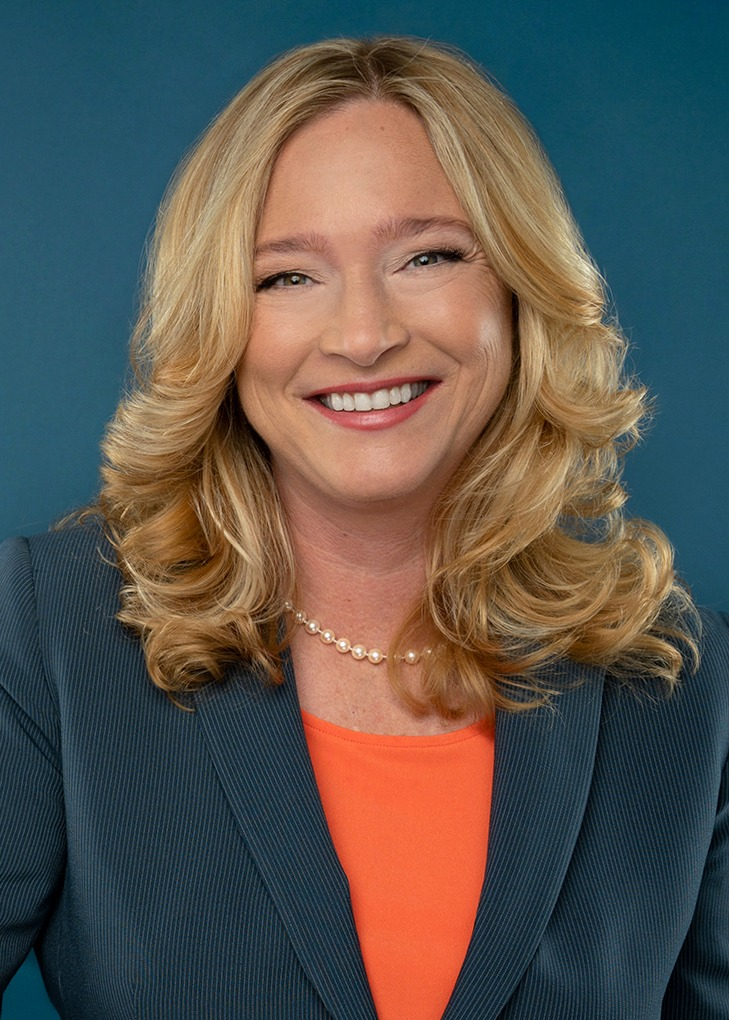

United States Attorney for the District of Utah
- In office May 4, 2022 – February 16, 2025
- President: Joe Biden; Donald Trump
- Preceded by: John W. Huber
- Succeeded by: Felice John Viti (acting)

Personal details
- Education: Weber State University (BA); University of Utah (JD)

Trina A. Higgins is an American lawyer who served as the United States attorney for the District of Utah from 2022 to 2025.

== Education ==
Higgins earned a Bachelor of Arts from Weber State University in 1992 and a Juris Doctor from the S.J. Quinney College of Law at the University of Utah in 1995.

== Career ==
From 1995 to 2002, Higgins served as deputy district attorney in the Salt Lake County District Attorney's Office. She has served as an assistant United States attorney in the United States Attorney's Office for the District of Utah from 2002 to 2022. Throughout her career, she has held various positions within the office including as tribal liaison from 2005 to 2015, chief of the violent crime section from 2008 to 2015, senior litigation counsel from 2015 to 2017, and special counsel to litigative programs from 2017 to 2021.

In 2025, Higgins joined the Salt Lake City office of Wilson Sonsini Goodrich & Rosati, as of counsel for litigation and appellate practices.

=== U.S. attorney for the District of Utah ===
On January 26, 2022, President Joe Biden announced his intent to nominate Higgins to be the United States attorney for the District of Utah. On January 31, 2022, her nomination was sent to the United States Senate. On March 10, 2022, her nomination was reported out of the Senate Judiciary Committee. On April 27, 2022, her nomination was confirmed in the Senate by voice vote. She was sworn in on May 4, 2022.

Higgins's tenure as U.S. Attorney ended on February 16, 2025.

Legal offices
Preceded by John W. Huber	United States Attorney for the District of Utah; 2022–2025	Succeeded by Felice John Viti (acting)
