= Tillman D. Johnson =

American district judge (1858–1953)

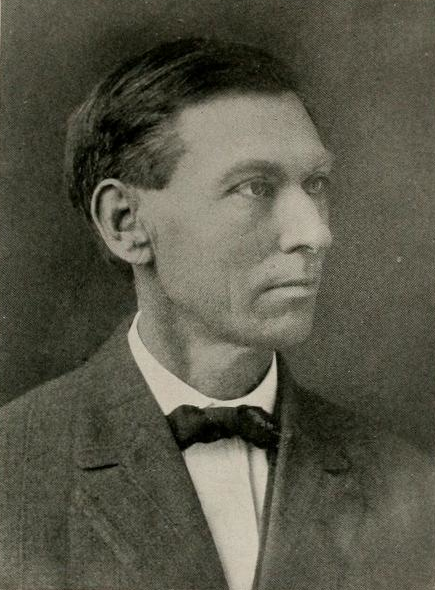

Senior Judge of the United States District Court for the District of Utah
- In office May 28, 1949 – November 1, 1953

Judge of the United States District Court for the District of Utah
- In office November 2, 1915 – May 28, 1949
- Appointed by: Woodrow Wilson
- Preceded by: John Augustine Marshall
- Succeeded by: Willis William Ritter

Personal details
- Born: Tillman Davis Johnson; January 8, 1858 Rutherford County, Tennessee
- Died: November 1, 1953 (aged 95) Ogden, Utah
- Education: Cumberland University read law

Tillman Davis Johnson (January 8, 1858 – November 1, 1953) was a United States district judge of the United States District Court for the District of Utah.

== Education and career ==
Born in Rutherford County, Tennessee, Johnson attended Cumberland University and read law to enter the bar. He was a teacher in Tennessee from 1880 to 1885, and was principal of the Government Indian School in Fort Bennett, Dakota Territory (now South Dakota) from 1886 to 1887, and of the Government Indian School in Fort Hall, Idaho Territory (now Idaho) from 1888 to 1889. He was in private practice in Ogden, Utah Territory (State of Utah from January 4, 1896) from 1889 to 1915. He was a member of the Utah House of Representatives from 1898 to 1899. In 1912, he ran for United States Congress as a Democrat.

== Federal judicial service ==
Johnson received a recess appointment from President Woodrow Wilson on November 2, 1915, to a seat on the United States District Court for the District of Utah vacated by Judge John Augustine Marshall. He was nominated to the same position by President Wilson on January 7, 1916. He was confirmed by the United States Senate on January 18, 1916, and received his commission the same day. He assumed senior status on May 28, 1949. His service terminated on November 1, 1953, due to his death in Ogden.

=== Attempted assassination ===
On September 30, 1927 Johnson was shot three times while mounting the bench in Salt Lake City, Utah. The assailant, Eliza Simmons was angry at Johnson for ruling against her in a case decided in 1924 involving the death of her husband in a 1910 mining accident. Johnson was not seriously injured, only suffering flesh wounds to his lower body. Simmons was convicted of attempted murder in November 1927, and sentenced to seven years in prison.

== See also ==
- List of United States federal judges by longevity of service

== Sources ==
Legal offices
Preceded by John Augustine Marshall	Judge of the United States District Court for the District of Utah; 1915–1949	Succeeded by Willis William Ritter
