= David Nuffer =

American judge (born 1952)

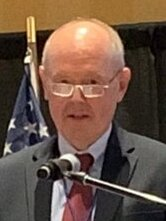
- Nuffer in 2019

Senior Judge of the United States District Court for the District of Utah
- Incumbent
- Assumed office April 2, 2022

Chief Judge of the United States District Court for the District of Utah
- In office September 1, 2014 – October 1, 2018
- Preceded by: Ted Stewart
- Succeeded by: Robert J. Shelby

Judge of the United States District Court for the District of Utah
- In office March 23, 2012 – April 2, 2022
- Appointed by: Barack Obama
- Preceded by: Dale A. Kimball
- Succeeded by: Ann Marie McIff Allen

Magistrate Judge of the United States District Court for the District of Utah
- In office 1995–2012

Personal details
- Born: David Ogden Nuffer; 1952 (age 73–74) Portland, Oregon, U.S.
- Education: Brigham Young University (BA, JD)

David Ogden Nuffer (born 1952) is a senior United States district judge of the United States District Court for the District of Utah.

== Biography ==
Nuffer was born in 1952 in Portland, Oregon. He received a Bachelor of Arts degree, cum laude, from Brigham Young University (BYU) in 1975 and a Juris Doctor, cum laude, from the J. Reuben Clark Law School at (BYU) in 1978. He served in private practice from 1978 until 2002. He was formerly a United States magistrate judge of the United States District Court for the District of Utah. He served in a part-time capacity while remaining a practicing lawyer starting in 1995 and became full-time in 2003, serving until his elevation to District Judge in 2012. Since 2001 he has been an adjunct professor at BYU. He served as president of the Utah State Bar from 2000 to 2001.

=== Federal judicial service ===
On June 29, 2011, President Barack Obama nominated Nuffer to serve as a United States District Judge for the United States District Court for the District of Utah. He would replace Judge Dale A. Kimball, who assumed senior status in 2009. The Senate Judiciary Committee held a hearing on his nomination on September 20, 2011 and reported it to the floor on October 13, 2011. On March 22, 2012, the United States Senate confirmed Nuffer by a 96–2 vote. He received his commission on March 23, 2012. He served as Chief Judge from 2014 to 2018. He assumed senior status on April 2, 2022.

On March 1, 2018, the District of Utah established a southern region serving the southern part of the state. In April 2019, Nuffer moved to southern Utah, becoming the first district judge in Utah to reside off the Wasatch Front. He has chambers in the St. George. The federal court leases offices and a courtroom there.

Legal offices
Preceded by Dale A. Kimball	Judge of the United States District Court for the District of Utah; 2012–2022	Succeeded by Ann Marie McIff Allen
Preceded by Ted Stewart	Chief Judge of the United States District Court for the District of Utah; 2014–2018	Succeeded by Robert J. Shelby
