= Elizabeth Kronk Warner =

American judge

Elizabeth Kronk Warner is Dean and Professor of Law at the S.J. Quinney College of Law at the University of Utah. She was previously a professor of law at the University of Kansas School of Law, where she was also an associate dean, and is a member of the Sault Tribe of Chippewa Indians. She is known for her work on Native American law, including its relations to climate change and same-sex marriage in Native American jurisdictions.

== Biography ==
Warner is a citizen of the Sault Ste. Marie Tribe of Chippewa Indians. She received her B.S. from Cornell University in 2000, and her Juris Doctor from the University of Michigan Law School in 2003.

Before moving to the University of Kansas, Warner was also on the law faculty at Texas Tech University School of Law and the Alexander Blewett III School of Law at the University of Montana. Additionally, she is an appellate judge in Michigan for the Sault Ste. Marie Tribe of Chippewa Indians Court of Appeals. In 2014, she was appointed as chairwoman of the Kansas State Advisory Committee of the United States Commission on Civil Rights, and as chair led the committee in investigating the discriminatory effects of voter ID laws.

She is an elected member of the board of directors of the Federal Bar Association, and editor-in-chief of The Federal Lawyer. She has also chaired the Indian Law Section of the Federal Bar.

== Selected publications ==
With Randall Abate, she is the editor of the book Climate Change and Indigenous Peoples: The Search for Legal Remedies (Edward Elgar Publishing, 2013). The book was considered "noteworthy" by the Journal of Latin American Geography because of the legal training and "practical experience" of the writers.
