= Jennifer Napier-Pearce =

American journalist

- Education: University of Utah, Stanford
- Occupation: Former Editor of The Salt Lake Tribune
- Known for: Salt Lake Tribune and RadioWest
- Spouse: John A. Pearce

Jennifer Napier-Pearce is an American journalist, former editor of The Salt Lake Tribune, and politician. She joined the Tribune in January 2013 as a business writer, before becoming host of the daily video program "Trib Talk" and the weekly radio news show "Behind the Headlines." She was named editor in August 2016. Prior to coming to the Tribune, Napier-Pearce was news director and reporter for KUER and KCPW.

She has been an adjunct professor at the University of Utah. She received a BA in English from the University of Utah in 1991 and an MA in Journalism from Stanford University in 1998.

She resigned as editor in August 2020, citing differences with board chairman Paul Huntsman.

She grew up in Magna UT, with Tongan heritage on her father's side; she was known as Alisi Pahulu until changing her name to Jennifer Napier. Her husband, John A. Pearce, is a justice on the Utah Supreme Court.

== Salt Lake Tribune ==
Napier-Pearce had recently left the Tribune and was two months into a new job at the Hinckley Institute of Politics when the new owner of the Tribune, Paul Huntsman contacted her, asking to "pick her brain about the paper's direction." She was soon announced as the editor, Huntsman's first hire. She was the first Mormon editor of the newspaper.

She has been actively involved in the Tribune's move to become a non-profit.

== Salt Lake City Council ==
After serving as communications director and advisor for Spencer Cox and later chief of staff for the George S. and Dolores Doré Eccles Foundation, she was appointed to the 4th district of the Salt Lake City Council by a coin toss.
