= American Inns of Court =

Legal organization

American Inns of Court Foundation
- Formation: 1985
- Type: Legal Society
- Headquarters: Alexandria, Virginia
- Location: United States
- President: Hon. Consuela Callahan
- Key people: Joseph B. Berger III (Executive Director)
- Website: www.innsofcourt.org

American Inns of Court (AIC) are an amalgam of judges, lawyers, and in some cases, law professors and law students. They are designed to improve the skills, professionalism and ethics of the bench and bar. Each Inn meets approximately once a month both to "break bread" and to hold programs and discussions on matters of ethics, skills, and professionalism.

== National organization ==
=== History ===
Beginning in the late 1970s, Chief Justice of the United States Warren Burger led a movement to create organizations in the United States inspired by and loosely modeled after the traditional English Inns of Court. At the suggestion of Rex Lee, a pilot program was entrusted to Senior United States District Court Judge A. Sherman Christensen, who honed the idea into a feasible concept. The first American Inn of Court was founded in 1980 in the Provo/Salt Lake City area of Utah, and included law students from Brigham Young University. Within the next three years, additional American Inns formed in Utah, Mississippi, Hawaii, New York and Washington, D.C.

In 1983, Chief Justice Burger created a committee of the Judicial Conference of the United States to explore whether the American Inn concept was of value to the administration of justice and, if so, whether there should be a national organization to promote, establish and assist American Inns, and promote the goals of legal excellence, civility, professionalism and ethics on a national level. The committee reported to the Judicial Conference affirmatively on the two questions and proposed the creation of the American Inns of Court Foundation. The Judicial Conference approved the reports and, thus, endorsed the American Inn concept and the formation of a national structure.

In 1985, the American Inns of Court Foundation was formally organized to promote and charter local Inns of Court across the United States.

=== Membership ===
The American Inns of Court actively involve more than 25,000 attorneys, legal scholars, judges (state, federal, and administrative), and law students. Membership is composed of the following categories:

- Masters of the Bench — judges, experienced lawyers, and law professors
- Barristers — lawyers with some experience who do not meet the minimum requirements for Masters
- Associates — lawyers who do not meet the minimum requirement for Barristers
- Pupils — law students.

== Local organizations ==
There are over 350 chartered American Inns of Court, each of which is locally organized and administered. The American Inns of Court provides a search tool for locating Inns by state or ZIP code, as well as by name or ID number.

At present, each major American city has more than one Inn of Court; for example, one Inn may be affiliated with a local law school, and another may be focused on a specific field of legal practice. Most Inns concentrate on issues surrounding civil and criminal litigation practice, and include attorneys from a number of specialties. However, there are several Inns that specialize in criminal practice, federal litigation, tax law, administrative law, white-collar crime, bankruptcy, intellectual property, family law, or employment and labor law.

American Inns of Court are groups of judges, practicing attorneys, law professors and students who meet regularly to discuss and debate issues relating to legal ethics and professionalism. An American Inn of Court is not a fraternal order, a social club, a course in continuing legal education, a lecture series, an apprenticeship system, or an adjunct of a law school program. While an American Inn of Court partakes of some of each of these concepts, it is quite different in aim, scope, and effect.

American Inn of Court meetings typically consist of a shared meal and a program presented by one of the Inn's pupillage teams. The membership of each Inn is divided into pupillage teams, with each team consisting of a few members from each membership category. Each pupillage team conducts one program for the Inn each year. Pupillage team members get together informally outside of monthly Inn meetings in groups of two or more. This allows the less-experienced attorneys to become more effective advocates and counselors by learning from the more-experienced attorneys and judges. In addition, each less-experienced member may be assigned to a more-experienced attorney or judge, who acts as a mentor and encourages conversations about the practice of law.

== Specialty Inn alliances ==
Groups of geographically dispersed Inns have formed alliances based on common subject matter focus in specialty areas of law, such as the Family Law Inn Alliance and Bankruptcy Inn Alliance.

The first such alliance, conceived in 2007, was the Linn Inn Alliance of Inns dedicated to intellectual property law. The Linn Inn Alliance began with five previously existing IP-focused Inns, and helped to create additional IP Inns in major cities, reaching 21 Inns by 2013, including an American Inn of Court in Tokyo, Japan.

== International ties ==
While the American Inns of Court share a collegial relationship with the English Inns, there is no formal or legal relationship. A Declaration of Friendship was signed by the English and American Inns of Court, establishing visitation procedures under which American members can acquire a letter of introduction that will officially introduce them to the Inns in England and Ireland, with reciprocal procedures available for English and Irish barristers.

An annual six-week exchange program, known as the Pegasus Scholarships, was created to provide for young English barristers to travel to the United States, and young American Inn of Court members to travel to London, to learn about the legal system of the other jurisdiction. Temple Bar Scholarships provide a similar program limited to American lawyers who have clerked for a U.S. Court of Appeals judge or for a justice of the U.S. Supreme Court.
