= Willis William Ritter =

American judge

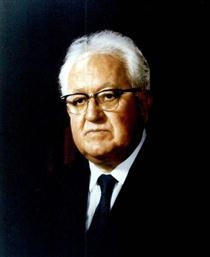

Chief Judge of the United States District Court for the District of Utah
- In office 1954–1978
- Preceded by: Office established
- Succeeded by: Aldon J. Anderson

Judge of the United States District Court for the District of Utah
- In office October 21, 1949 – March 4, 1978
- Appointed by: Harry S. Truman
- Preceded by: Tillman D. Johnson
- Succeeded by: Bruce Sterling Jenkins

Personal details
- Born: Willis William Ritter; January 24, 1899 Salt Lake City, Utah
- Died: March 4, 1978 (aged 79) Salt Lake City, Utah
- Education: University of Utah (A.B.); University of Chicago Law School (LL.B.); Harvard Law School (S.J.D.)

Willis William Ritter (January 24, 1899 – March 4, 1978) was a United States district judge of the United States District Court for the District of Utah.

== Education and career ==
Ritter was born in Salt Lake City, Utah, and grew up in Midway, Utah and Park City, Utah. He received an Artium Baccalaureus degree from the University of Utah, and a Bachelor of Laws from the University of Chicago Law School in 1924. He was in private practice in Chicago, Illinois, and Washington, D.C. from 1924 to 1926. He was a professor of law at the University of Utah from 1926 to 1950, and in private practice in Salt Lake City from 1935 to 1949, also receiving a Doctor of Juridical Science from Harvard Law School in 1940.

== Federal judicial service ==
On October 21, 1949, Ritter received a recess appointment from President Harry S. Truman to a seat on the United States District Court for the District of Utah vacated by Judge Tillman D. Johnson. He was formally nominated on January 5, 1950, and opposed during the confirmation process by United States Senator from Utah Arthur Vivian Watkins. Ritter was confirmed by the United States Senate on June 29, 1950, and received his commission on July 7, 1950. He served as Chief Judge from 1954 until his death on March 4, 1978, in Salt Lake City.

== Sources ==
Legal offices
Preceded by Tillman D. Johnson	Judge of the United States District Court for the District of Utah; 1949–1978	Succeeded by Bruce Sterling Jenkins
Preceded by Office established	Chief Judge of the United States District Court for the District of Utah; 1954–1978	Succeeded by Aldon J. Anderson
