= David Kent Winder =

American judge

Senior Judge of the United States District Court for the District of Utah
- In office June 8, 1997 – May 19, 2009

Chief Judge of the United States District Court for the District of Utah
- In office 1993–1997
- Preceded by: Bruce Sterling Jenkins
- Succeeded by: David Sam

Judge of the United States District Court for the District of Utah
- In office December 6, 1979 – June 8, 1997
- Appointed by: Jimmy Carter
- Preceded by: Seat established by 92 Stat. 1629
- Succeeded by: Dale A. Kimball

Utah Third District Judge
- In office 1977–1979
- Appointed by: Scott M. Matheson

Personal details
- Born: David Kent Winder; June 8, 1932 Salt Lake City, Utah, U.S.
- Died: May 18, 2009 (aged 76) Salt Lake City, Utah, U.S.
- Education: University of Utah (BA); Stanford University (LLB)

David Kent Winder (June 8, 1932 – May 19, 2009) was a United States district judge of the United States District Court for the District of Utah.

== Education and career ==
Born in Salt Lake City, Utah, to a locally prominent family, whose main business was a large dairy farm (Winder Farms), Winder attended Granite High School, where played tricks such as parading a cow through the school's halls when campaigning for student-body president. Winder received a Bachelor of Arts degree from University of Utah in 1955. He received a Bachelor of Laws from Stanford Law School in 1958. He was a United States Air Force Airman First Class from 1951 to 1952. He was in private practice of law in Salt Lake City from 1958 to 1977. He was a law clerk for Allan Crockett, Chief Justice of the Utah Supreme Court from 1958 to 1959. He was a deputy county attorney of Salt Lake County, Utah from 1959 to 1963. He was an Assistant United States Attorney of the District of Utah from 1963 to 1965. He was the chief deputy district attorney of Utah from 1965 to 1966. He served at the law firm of Strong & Hanni from 1966 to 1977. Governor Scott M. Matheson appointed Winder to Utah's Third District Court, where he served from 1977 to 1979.

== Federal judicial service ==
Winder was nominated by President Jimmy Carter on November 1, 1979, to the United States District Court for the District of Utah, to a new seat created by 92 Stat. 1629. He was confirmed by the United States Senate on December 4, 1979, and received his commission on December 6, 1979. He served as Chief Judge from 1993 to 1997. He assumed senior status on June 8, 1997, serving in that status until his death.

== Illness and death ==
Winder battled Parkinson's disease in his final years, and in 2007 he ceased hearing cases, due to the disease's debilitating effects and the onset of dementia. He died on May 19, 2009, in Salt Lake City at the age of 76. He was preceded in death by his wife, and was survived by his three children (son Jim was the Salt Lake County Sheriff at the time of his father's death). He was buried on the family plot at Winder Dairy on 26 May.

== Honors and awards ==
Within a year of being appointed to the bench, Winder was named Judge of the Year by the Utah State Bar. In a 1996 poll of Utah lawyers conducted by the Salt Lake Tribune newspaper, Winder was the state's highest-rated judge. Lawyers considered Winder to be an outstanding jurist. A University of Utah law professor described him as "the consummate federal judge".

== Sources ==
Legal offices
| Preceded by Seat established by 92 Stat. 1629 | Judge of the United States District Court for the District of Utah; 1979–1997 | Succeeded by Dale A. Kimball |
| Preceded by Bruce Sterling Jenkins | Chief Judge of the United States District Court for the District of Utah; 1993–1997 | Succeeded by David Sam |
