= Utah State Bar =

Utah's official attorney licensing agency

- Formation: 1931
- Type: Legal Society
- Headquarters: 645 South 200 East, Salt Lake City, Utah 84111
- Location: United States
- Members: 10,792 in 2024
- President: Kim Cordova
- President-Elect: Tyler Young
- Website: http://www.utahbar.org/

The Utah State Bar is the regulatory agency established by the Utah Supreme Court to regulate the practice of law in Utah. The Utah State Bar is funded by dues (licensing fees) from members, Bar exam dues, continuing legal education fees, Pro Hac Vice fees, and revenue generated from meetings and conventions, including the Bar's spring convention in St. George, summer convention, and Fall Forum. Beginning in 2019, the Utah State Bar, in conjunction with the Supreme Court, implemented a series of groundbreaking changes designed to improve access to justice for all individuals.

== History ==
Starting around 1851, lawyers in the Territory of Utah would petition the Supreme Court for permission to practice law in Utah, and once approved, they became members of the bar of all the courts in the territory. Historically, admission would come after either an examination by a committee appointed by the Supreme Court, or after an examination conducted by the local district court judges for the territory. Similarly, removal of attorneys for misconduct relied on the individual determination of the local court. In essence, while applicants had to be admitted to practice, no formal bar association existed and admissions occurred based on the determination of local judges or the Supreme Court. Informal associations of Utah lawyers began to form no later than the early 20th century, including a coordinated effort in 1894.

In 1931 the Utah legislature passed a law designating the private corporation known as "Utah State Bar" to self-regulate the activities of dues-paying legal licensees in the State of Utah.

== Structure ==
The Utah State Bar is managed by a Board of Commissioners including thirteen voting members, eleven elected lawyers and two non-lawyer public members appointed by the Court. The Commission also includes non-voting ex officio members: the deans of the University of Utah's S.J. Quinney College of Law and Brigham Young University's J. Reuben Clark Law School, the Bar's delegates to the American Bar Association's House of Delegates, and Utah members' "state delegate" to the ABA HoD, the president of Utah's Young Lawyers Division (YLD), representatives from the Women Lawyers of Utah (WLU) and the Utah Minority Bar Association (UMBA), the Bar's representative to the Utah Judicial Council, a Court designee to the Bar Commission, immediate past president of the Bar, and president of the Bar's paralegal division.

The Utah State Bar maintains a requirement that Utah legal licensees complete 12 credits of Continuing Legal Education (CLE) each year, including a one-hour credit for ethics, and a one-hour credit for professionalism and civility. Utah's lawyers are subject to the Utah Rules of Professional Conduct, abide by the Standards of Professionalism and Civility, and take the attorney's oath. Utah lawyers aspire to the ideals of the profession set forth in the Preamble to the Rules of Professional Conduct.

== Publications ==
The Utah State Bar publishes the bi-monthly Utah Bar Journal.

== Pornographic Email Incident ==
Just after 3:00 pm on Monday March 5, 2018 a NSFW email containing a large pornographic image resembling the bare breasts of a female was sent from Utah State Bar to every dues-paying member of Utah State Bar. This included over 500 dues-paying members outside of Utah. The pornographic image was opened by at least one dues-paying member who claimed to be on the house floor of the Utah State Capital and that an intern also saw the pornographic image.
