= Tena Campbell =

American judge (born 1944)

Senior Judge of the United States District Court for the District of Utah
- Incumbent
- Assumed office January 1, 2011

Chief Judge of the United States District Court for the District of Utah
- In office 2006–2011
- Preceded by: Dee Benson
- Succeeded by: Ted Stewart

Judge of the United States District Court for the District of Utah
- In office June 30, 1995 – January 1, 2011
- Appointed by: Bill Clinton
- Preceded by: Bruce Sterling Jenkins
- Succeeded by: Robert J. Shelby

Personal details
- Born: Marilyn Bernie Gresky; December 11, 1944 (age 81) Wendell, Idaho
- Spouse: Gordon W. Campbell
- Education: University of Idaho (BA); Arizona State University (MA, JD)

Marilyn Bernie "Tena" Gresky Campbell (born December 11, 1944) is an American jurist, lawyer, and former school teacher. She is a senior United States district judge of the United States District Court for the District of Utah.

== Education and career ==
Born in Wendell, Idaho, Campbell received a Bachelor of Arts degree from the University of Idaho in 1967, a Master of Arts from Arizona State University in 1970, and a Juris Doctor from Arizona State University College of Law in 1977.

She began her career as a school teacher. She taught French at a high school level in Twin Falls, Idaho from 1967 to 1969 and taught the same subject at Tempe High School in Tempe, Arizona from 1972 to 1973. She taught French in evening classes at Phoenix Junior College in Phoenix, Arizona from 1972 to 1973.

She was in private practice in Salt Lake City, Utah from 1977 to 1981, and then entered public service, becoming a Deputy county attorney in the Salt Lake County Attorney's Office, Utah in 1981. Later that year, she became an Assistant United States Attorney in Salt Lake City, a position she held until 1995.

=== Federal judicial service ===
On June 22, 1995, Campbell was nominated by President Bill Clinton to a seat on the United States District Court for the District of Utah vacated by Bruce Sterling Jenkins. She was confirmed by the United States Senate on June 30, 1995, and received her commission the same day. She served as chief judge from 2006 to 2011. She assumed senior status on January 1, 2011.

== Honor ==
She was named the Christine M. Durham Woman Lawyer of the Year in 2007 by Woman Lawyers of Utah.

== See also ==
- List of first women lawyers and judges in Utah

Legal offices
Preceded by Bruce Sterling Jenkins	Judge of the United States District Court for the District of Utah; 1995–2011	Succeeded by Robert J. Shelby
Preceded by Dee Benson	Chief Judge of the United States District Court for the District of Utah; 2006–2011	Succeeded by Ted Stewart
