= United States District Court for the District of Utah =

United States federal district court of Utah

- (D. Utah)
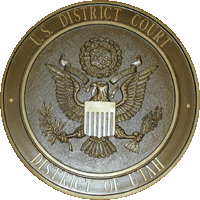

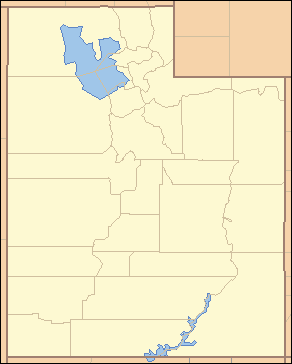
- Location: Orrin G. Hatch United States Courthouse (Salt Lake City) More locations: Provo; Ogden; St. George; Moab; Monticello
- Appeals to: Tenth Circuit
- Established: July 16, 1894
- Judges: 5
- Chief Judge: Jill Parrish

Officers of the court
- U.S. Attorney: Melissa Holyoak
- www.utd.uscourts.gov

The United States District Court for the District of Utah (in case citations, D. Utah) is the federal district court whose jurisdiction is the state of Utah. The court is based in Salt Lake City with another courtroom leased in the state courthouse in St. George.

Appeals from the District of Utah are taken to the United States Court of Appeals for the Tenth Circuit (except for patent claims and claims against the U.S. government under the Tucker Act, which are appealed to the Federal Circuit).

The United States Attorney's Office for the District of Utah represents the United States in civil and criminal litigation in the court. As of November 15, 2025 the United States attorney is Melissa Holyoak.

== Current judges ==
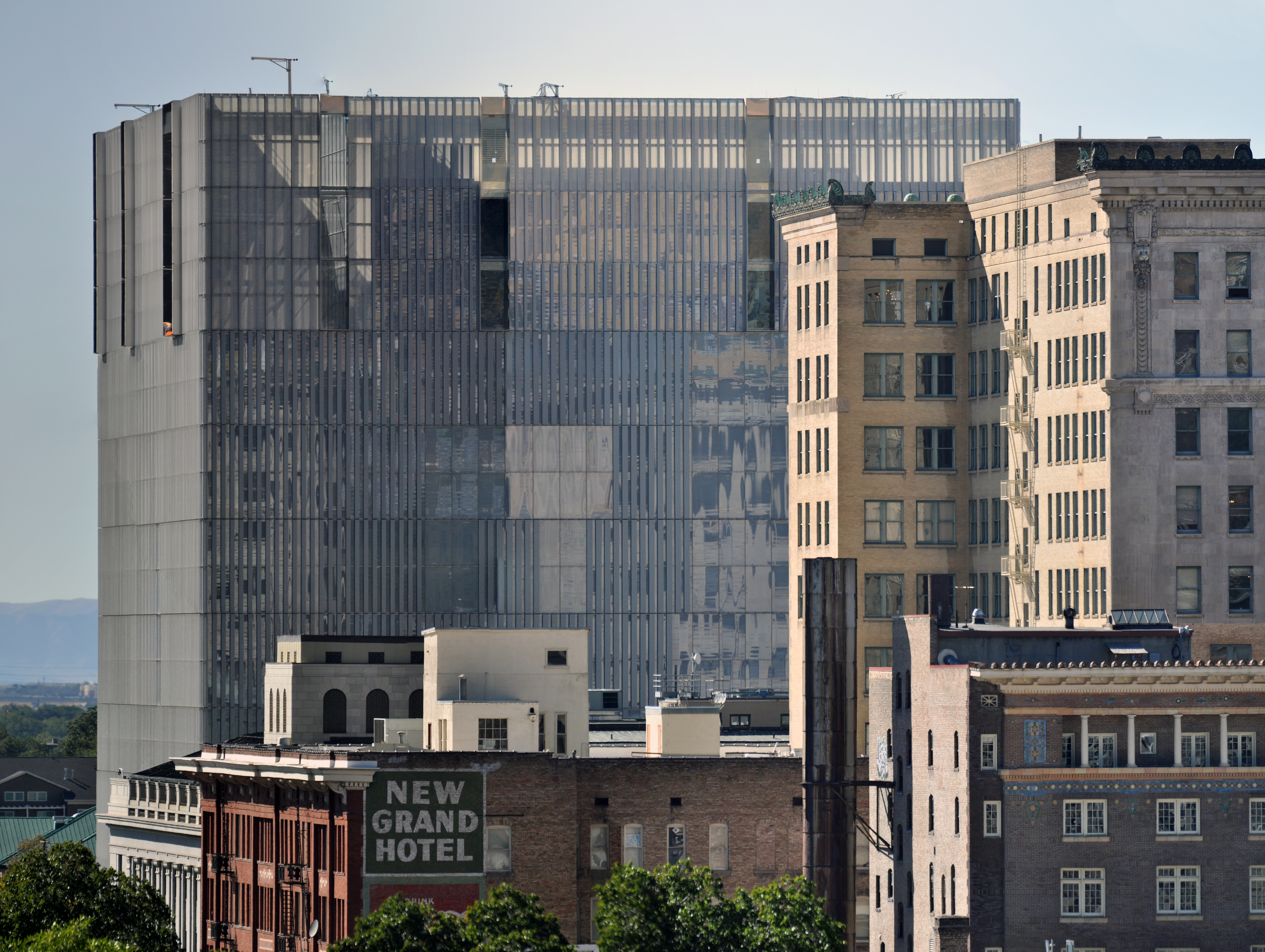
U.S. Courthouse for the District of Utah

As of October 1, 2025:

#	Title	Judge	Duty station	Born	Term of service			Appointed by
#	Title	Judge	Duty station	Born	Active	Chief	Senior	Appointed by
18	Chief Judge	Jill Parrish	Salt Lake City	1961	2015–present	2025–present	—	Obama
17	District Judge	Robert J. Shelby	Salt Lake City	1970	2012–present	2018–2025	—	Obama
19	District Judge	Howard C. Nielson Jr.	Salt Lake City	1968	2019–present	—	—	Trump
20	District Judge	David Barlow	Salt Lake City	1971	2020–present	—	—	Trump
21	District Judge	Ann Marie McIff Allen	St. George; Salt Lake City	1972	2024–present	—	—	Biden
9	Senior Judge	David Sam	Salt Lake City	1933	1985–1999	1997–1999	1999–present	Reagan
11	Senior Judge	Tena Campbell	Salt Lake City	1944	1995–2011	2006–2011	2011–present	Clinton
12	Senior Judge	Dale A. Kimball	Salt Lake City	1939	1997–2009	—	2009–present	Clinton
13	Senior Judge	Ted Stewart	Salt Lake City	1948	1999–2014	2011–2014	2014–present	Clinton
15	Senior Judge	Clark Waddoups	Salt Lake City	1946	2008–2019	—	2019–present	G.W. Bush
16	Senior Judge	David Nuffer	St. George	1952	2012–2022	2014–2018	2022–present	Obama

== Former judges ==
#	Judge	Born–died	Active service	Chief Judge	Senior status	Appointed by	Reason for termination
1	John Augustine Marshall	1854–1941	1896–1915	—	—	Cleveland	resignation
2	Tillman D. Johnson	1858–1953	1915–1949 (Note: Recess appointment; formally nominated on January 7, 1916, confirmed by the United States Senate on January 18, 1916, and received commission the same day.)	—	1949–1953	Wilson	death
3	Willis William Ritter	1899–1978	1949–1978 (Note: Recess appointment; formally nominated on January 5, 1950, confirmed by the United States Senate on June 29, 1950, and received commission on July 7, 1950.)	1954–1978	—	Truman	death
4	Albert Sherman Christensen	1905–1996	1954–1971	—	1971–1996	Eisenhower	death
5	Aldon J. Anderson	1917–1996	1971–1984	1978–1984	1984–1996	Nixon	death
6	Bruce Sterling Jenkins	1927–2023	1978–1994	1984–1993	1994–2023	Carter	death
7	David Kent Winder	1932–2009	1979–1997	1993–1997	1997–2009	Carter	death
8	John Thomas Greene Jr.	1929–2011	1985–1997	—	1997–2011	Reagan	death
10	Dee Benson	1948–2020	1991–2014	1999–2006	2014–2020	G. H. W. Bush	death
14	Paul G. Cassell	1959–present	2002–2007	—	—	G. W. Bush	resignation

== Chief judges ==
Chief judges have administrative responsibilities with respect to their district court. Unlike the Supreme Court, where one justice is specifically nominated to be chief, the office of chief judge rotates among the district court judges. To be chief, a judge must have been in active service on the court for at least one year, be under the age of 65, and have not previously served as chief judge.

A vacancy is filled by the judge highest in seniority among the group of qualified judges. The chief judge serves for a term of seven years, or until age 70, whichever occurs first. The age restrictions are waived if no members of the court would otherwise be qualified for the position.

When the office was created in 1948, the chief judge was the longest-serving judge who had not elected to retire, on what has since 1958 been known as senior status, or declined to serve as chief judge. After August 6, 1959, judges could not become or remain chief after turning 70 years old. The current rules have been in operation since October 1, 1982.

== Succession of seats ==
Seat 1
Seat established on January 4, 1896 by 28 Stat. 107
Marshall	1896–1915
Johnson	1916–1949
Ritter	1950–1978
Jenkins	1978–1994
Campbell	1995–2011
Shelby	2012–present

Seat 2
Seat established on February 10, 1954 by 68 Stat. 8 (temporary)
Seat made permanent on May 19, 1961 by 75 Stat. 80
Christensen	1954–1971
Anderson	1971–1984
Sam	1985–1999
Cassell	2002–2007
Waddoups	2008–2019
Barlow	2020–present

Seat 3
Seat established on October 20, 1978 by 92 Stat. 1629
Winder	1979–1997
Kimball	1997–2009
Nuffer	2012–2022
Allen	2024–present

Seat 4
Seat established on July 10, 1984 by 98 Stat. 333
Greene, Jr.	1985–1997
Stewart	1999–2014
Nielson, Jr.	2019–present

Seat 5
Seat established on December 1, 1990 by 104 Stat. 5089
Benson	1991–2014
Parrish	2015–present

== See also ==
- Courts of Utah
- List of current United States district judges
- List of United States federal courthouses in Utah
- United States Bankruptcy Court for the District of Utah
