= S.J. Quinney College of Law =

Graduate school in Salt Lake City, Utah, US

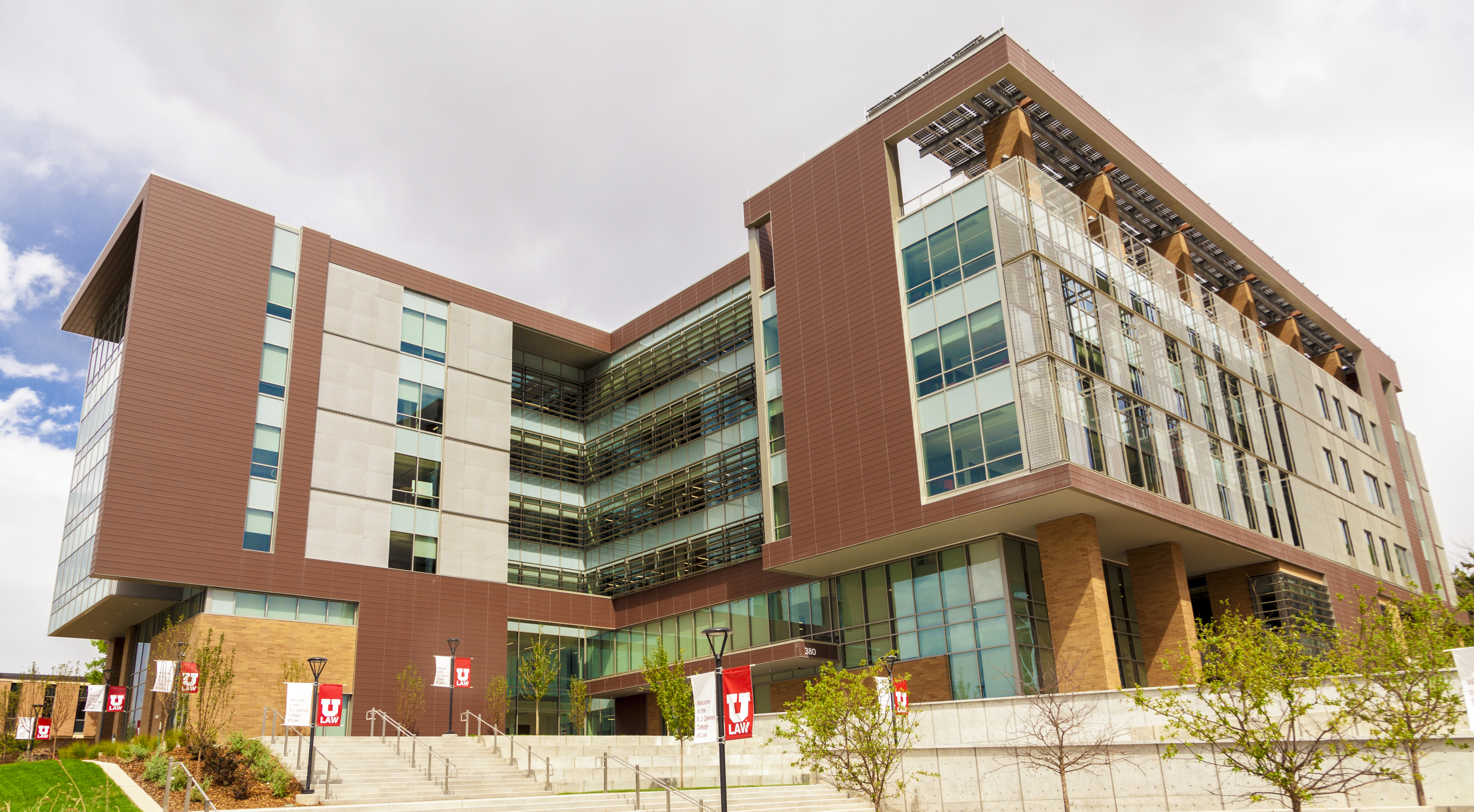
- S.J. Quinney College of Law Building
- Established: 1913
- School type: Public university
- Dean: Elizabeth Kronk Warner
- Location: Salt Lake City, Utah, United States; 40°45′44″N 111°51′07″W
- Enrollment: 312 (2025)
- Faculty: 38 (2025)
- USNWR ranking: 44th (tie) (2026)
- Bar pass rate: 98.77% (Class of 2023, Ultimate)
- Website: law.utah.edu
- ABA profile: S.J. Quinney College of Law Profile

The S.J. Quinney College of Law is the professional graduate law school of the University of Utah. It is located in Salt Lake City, Utah. The law school was originally called the University of Utah College of Law, changing to its current name on November 2, 2001, in acknowledgement of a $26 million gift from the S.J. and Jessie E. Quinney Foundation.

== History ==
The school was established in 1913. It is a member of the Association of American Law Schools and is accredited by the American Bar Association. The law school was originally called the University of Utah College of Law, changing to its current name on November 2, 2001, in acknowledgement of a $26 million gift from the S.J. and Jessie E. Quinney Foundation. S.J. "Joe" Quinney (1893–1983) was a Utah attorney who helped develop the Alta Ski Area.

In 2019, Elizabeth Kronk Warner became the 12th dean of the S.J. Quinney College of Law. She is the first woman and Native American named to deanship in the college's history.

== Campus ==
The law school building is located in the south-west corner of the University of Utah campus, directly north of the Stadium light rail station and Rice–Eccles Stadium, and approximately 2.5 miles from downtown Salt Lake City.

The James E. Faust Law Library (formerly the S.J. Quinney Law Library) is integrated into the law school building. The first floor, parts of the second floor, and the sixth floor of the building are open to the public; materials located on upper floors can be retrieved for public patrons.

Utah Law's $62.5 million building was opened on September 1, 2015.

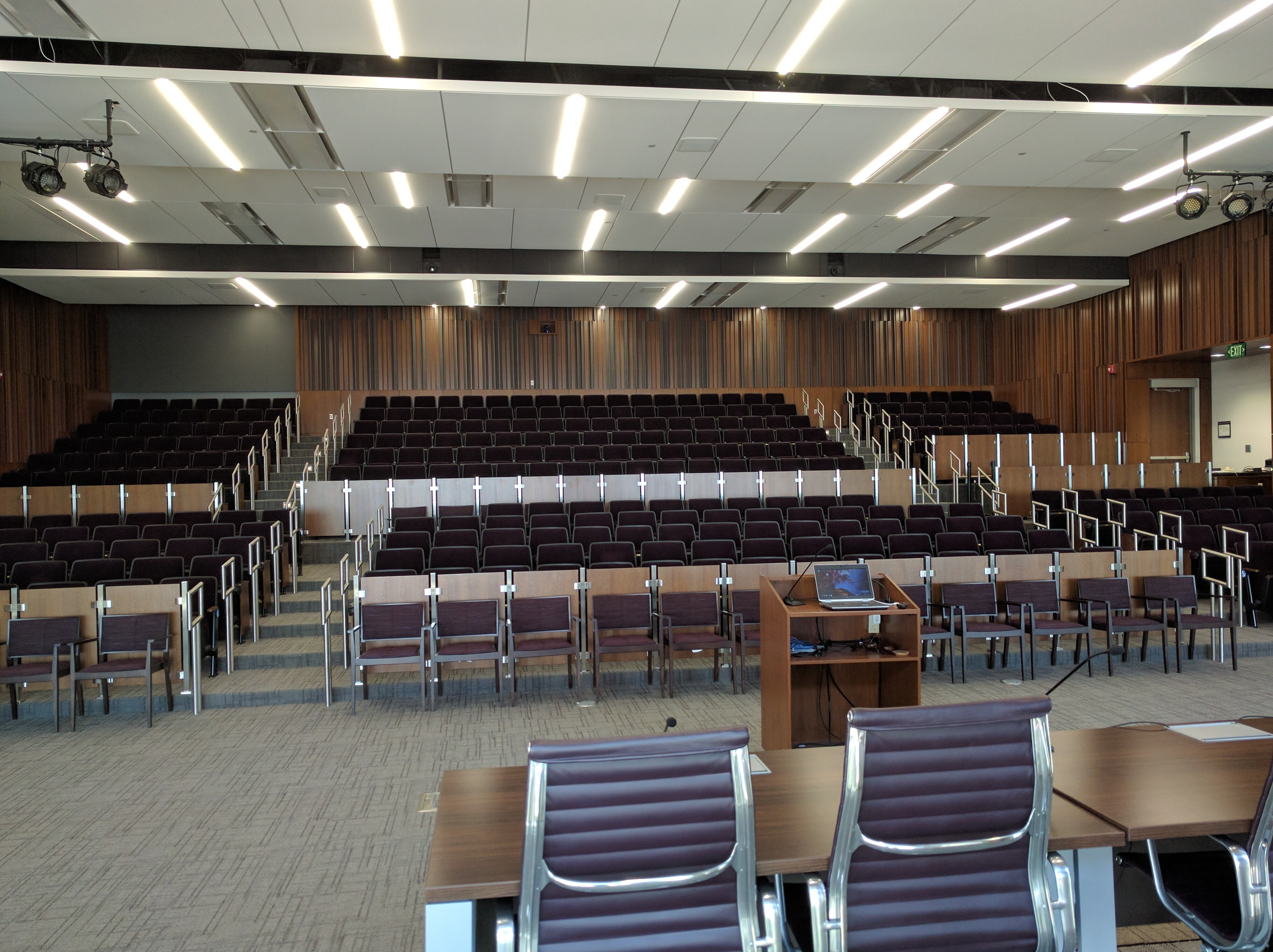
The moot courtroom of the S.J. Quinney College of Law

== Reputation ==
According to the USNWR 2026 Law School Rankings, the S.J. Quinney College of Law was named a "Top Tier" Law School and was ranked #44 out of 196 law schools in the United States. As of 2026, Utah Law was among the 20 law schools in the United States with the highest first-time bar passage rates. has the second lowest student to faculty ratio at 4.2:1, behind only the University of Arizona. Its environmental law program is ranked #8 nationally.

== Admissions, and bar passage ==
The 2025 incoming class of 107 students had a median LSAT score of 166 and median GPA of 3.87. 1L tuition and fees at S.J. Quinney School of Law for the 2025–2026 academic year were $34,721 for residents and $45,382 for non-residents.

As of 2026, Utah Law offers a juris doctor (JD), a master of laws (LLM) in environmental and natural resources law, a master of legal studies (MLS), an undergraduate major and minor in legal studies, and micro-credential courses in mediation.

The overall bar passage rate in 2026 was 98.77%.

== Scholarly publications ==
The S.J. Quinney College of Law publishes the legal journal Utah Law Review.

== Organizations ==
Campus organizations in alphabetical order include:

- Business Law Society – student organization for anyone interested in the law and business. Events focus on how the law and business intersect.
- Environmental Law Forum – Open to all Utah Law students with interests in environmental law.
- Federalist Society – The Federalist Society for Law and Public Policy Studies is a group of conservatives and libertarians interested in the current state of the legal order.
- J. Reuben Clark Law Society – The JRCLS is an international organization of law school students and graduates with over 65 chapters throughout the world. Although closely associated with the LDS Church, membership in the church is not required to join JRCLS.
- Minority Law Caucus – a student organization at the University of Utah S.J Quinney College of Law
- National Lawyers Guild
- Pride Law Caucus – An association of LGBTQ+ and allied students.
- Public Interest Law Organization (PILO) – to promote scholarship, activism, and career opportunities for law students interested in working for the public interest. This includes local, state, and federal government, as well as non profits and other organizations.
- Student Immigration Law Association (SILA)
- Student Intellectual Property Law Association (SIPLA) – Open to all students interested in intellectual property law.
- Sports Law Club – Provides a forum for students interested in sports law.
- Student Bar Association (SBA) – The SBA is the official student government of Utah law. It plans student activities, organizes the mentor program for 1L students and other programs such as social events, philanthropies, and intramural sports. The SBA also serves as the Student Advisory Committee (SAC) and elected student government of the College of Law. As voting members of the College Council, SBA Board members represent the student body to the law school faculty and administration.
- Women's Law Caucus – Promotes interest in issues of particular concern to women.

== Notable alumni ==
State Supreme Court justices

- Roger I. McDonough (graduated 1925), chief justice, Utah Supreme Court, 1947–1948, 1954–1959
- Richard C. Howe (graduated 1948), chief justice, Utah Supreme Court, 1998–2002
- Richard J. Maughan (graduated 1951), chief justice, Utah Supreme Court, 1981
- Gordon R. Hall (graduated 1951), chief justice, Utah Supreme Court, 1981–1993
- Michael David Zimmerman (graduated 1969), chief justice, Utah Supreme Court, 1994–1998
- Cynthia Meyer (graduated 1987), Idaho Supreme Court, 2024–present
- Jill Pohlman (graduated 1996), Utah Supreme Court, 2022–present
- Diana Hagen (graduated 1998), Utah Supreme Court, 2022–present

Utah Court of Appeals judges

- Michele Christiansen, judge, 2010–present

State government officials

- Herbert B. Maw (graduated 1916), governor of Utah, 1941–1949
- Myron E. Leavitt (graduated 1956), lieutenant governor of Nevada, 1979–1983
- Henry Adams (graduated 1959), assistant attorney general of Utah and first Black graduate of Utah Law
- Paul Van Dam (graduated 1966), attorney general of Utah, 1989–1993
- Larry J. Echo Hawk (graduated 1973), attorney general of Idaho, 1991–1995; US Assistant Secretary for Bureau of Indian Affairs, 2009–2012
- Jan Graham (graduated 1980), attorney general of Utah, 1993–2001

Federal judges

- David Thomas Lewis (graduated 1937), US Court of Appeals for the 10th circuit, 1956–1977
- Aldon J. Anderson (graduated 1943), US District Court for Utah, 1971–1984
- Marion Callister (graduated 1951), US District Court for Idaho, 1976–1989
- Bruce Sterling Jenkins (graduated 1952), US District Court for Utah, 1978–1994
- John Thomas Greene Jr. (graduated 1955), US District Court for Utah, 1985–1997
- Kent Dawson (graduated 1971), US District Court for Nevada, 2000–present
- David G. Campbell (graduated 1979), US District Court for Arizona, 2003–present
- Carolyn B. McHugh (graduated 1982), US Court of Appeals for the 10th circuit, 2014–present

Federal legislators and government officials

- William A. Dawson (graduated 1926), US House of Representatives from Utah, 1947–1949, 1953–1959
- Reva Bosone (graduated 1930), US House of Representatives from Utah, 1949–1953
- Allan Turner Howe (graduated 1954), US House of Representatives from Utah, 1975–1977
- Wayne Owens (graduated 1964), US House of Representatives from Utah, 1973–1975, 1987–1993
- S. Lane Tucker (graduated 1987), US attorney for the District of Alaska, 2022–2025
- Trina Higgins (graduated 1995), US attorney for the District of Utah, 2022–2025
- Melissa Holyoak (graduated 2003), US Attorney for the District of Utah, 2025–present

Other

- Bill Boyd (graduated 1957), businessman and co-founder of Boyd Gaming
