= List of justices of the Utah Supreme Court =

Following is a list of justices of the Utah Supreme Court.

== List of chief justices ==
=== Utah Territory Supreme Court (1850–96) ===
- Lemuel G. Brandebury (sometimes spelled Brandenbury or Brandeberg), 1851
- Lazarus Hammond Read, 1852
- John F. Kinney 1853–1857
- Delana R. Eckels, 1857–1860
- John F. Kinney, 1860–1863
- John Titus, 1863–1868
- Charles C. Wilson, 1868–1870
- James B. McKean, 1870–1875
- David P. Lowe, 1875
- Alexander White, 1875
- Michael Schaeffer, 1876–1879
- John A. Hunter, 1879–1884
- Charles S. Zane, 1884–1888; 1889–1894
- Elliott Sandford, 1888
- Samuel A. Merritt, 1894–1896

=== Utah Supreme Court (since statehood) ===
- Charles S. Zane, 1896–1899
- George W. Bartch, 1899–1901
- James A. Miner, 1896–1903
- Robert N. Baskin, 1903–1905
- George W. Bartch, 1905–1906
- William M. McCarty, 1906–1908
- Daniel N. Straup, 1908–1910
- Joseph E. Frick, 1910–1912
- William M. McCarty, 1912–1915
- Daniel N. Straup, 1915–1917
- Joseph E. Frick, 1917–1919
- Elmer E. Corfman, 1919–1923
- Albert J. Weber, 1923–1925
- Valentine Gideon, 1925–1927
- Samuel R. Thurman, 1927–1929
- James W. Cherry, 1929–1933
- Daniel N. Straup, 1933–1935
- Elias Hansen, 1935–1937
- William H. Folland, 1937–1939
- David W. Moffat, 1939–1943
- James H. Wolfe, 1943–1944
- Martin M. Larson, 1945–1946
- Roger I. McDonough, 1947–1948
- Eugene E. Pratt, 1939–1951
- James H. Wolfe, 1951–1954
- Roger I. McDonough, 1954–1959
- J. Allen Crockett, 1959–1961
- Lester A. Wade, 1961–1963
- F. Henri Henriod, 1963–1967
- J. Allen Crockett, 1967–1970
- E. R. Callister Jr., 1971–1975
- F. Henri Henriod, 1975–1976
- A. H. Ellett, 1977–1979
- J. Allen Crockett, 1979–1981
- Richard J. Maughan, 1981
- Gordon R. Hall, 1981–1994
- Michael David Zimmerman, 1994–1998
- Richard C. Howe, 1998–2002
- Christine M. Durham, 2002–2012
- Matthew B. Durrant, 2012–

== List of associate justices ==
=== Utah Territory Supreme Court (1850–96) ===
- Perry E. Brocchus, 1850–51
- Zerubbabel Snow, 1850–54
- Leonidas Shaver, 1852–55
- William W. Drummond, 1855–57
- George P. Stiles, 1854–57
- Charles E. Sinclair, 1857–60
- Emery D. Potter, 1857 (declined appointment)
- John Cradlebaugh, 1858–60
- Henry R. Crosbie (sometimes spelled Crosby), 1860–61
- R. P. Flenniken, 1860–61
- Thomas J. Drake, 1862–69
- Charles B. Waite, 1862–64
- Solomon P. McCurdy, 1864–68
- Enos D. Hoge, 1868–69
- Cyrus M. Hawley, 1869–73
- Obed F. Strickland, 1869–73
- Jacob S. Boreman, 1873–80
- Phillip H. Emerson, 1873–76
- John M. Coghlan, 1876–80
- Stephen R. Twiss, 1880–84
- Jacob S. Boreman, 1885–89
- Orlando W. Powers, 1885–86
- Henry P. Henderson, 1886–89
- John W. Judd, 1888–89
- Thomas J. Anderson, 1889–93
- John W. Blackburn, 1889–93
- George W. Bartch, 1893–94
- Harvey W. Smith, 1893–95
- William H. King, 1894–96
- Henry H. Rolapp, 1895–96

=== Utah Supreme Court (since statehood) ===
- George W. Bartch, 1896–1906
- James A. Miner, 1896–1903
- Charles S. Zane, 1896–1899
- Robert N. Baskin, 1899–1905
- William M. McCarty, 1903–1918
- Daniel N. Straup, 1905–1917
- Joseph E. Frick, 1906–1927
- Elmer E. Corfman, 1917–1923
- Valentine Gideon, 1917–1927
- Samuel R. Thurman, 1917–1929
- Albert J. Weber, 1919–1925
- James W. Cherry, 1923–1933
- Daniel N. Straup, 1925–1935
- Elias Hansen, 1927–35
- Valentine Gideon, 1927–1929
- William H. Folland, 1929–1937
- Ephraim Hanson, 1929–1938
- David W. Moffat, 1933–1944
- James H. Wolfe, 1935–1954
- Martin M. Larson, 1937–1946
- Roger I. McDonough, 1939–1966
- Eugene E. Pratt, 1941–1951
- Lester A. Wade, 1943–1966
- Abe W. Turner, 1944–1946
- J. Allen Crockett, 1951–1981
- F. Henri Henriod, 1951–1976
- George W. Latimer, 1954–1959
- George W. Worthen Jr., 1954–1959
- E. R. Callister Jr., 1959–1975
- R. L. Tuckett, 1966–1976
- A. H. Ellett, 1967–1979
- Richard J. Maughan, 1975–1981
- D. Frank Wilkins, 1976–1980
- Gordon R. Hall, 1977–1994
- I. Daniel Stewart, 1979–2000
- Richard C. Howe, 1980–2003
- Dallin H. Oaks, 1980–1984
- Christine M. Durham, 1982–2017
- Michael David Zimmerman, 1984–2000
- Leonard H. Russon, 1994–2003
- Matthew B. Durrant, 2000–2026
- Michael J. Wilkins, 2000–2010
- Ronald E. Nehring, 2003–2015
- Jill Parrish, 2003–2015
- Thomas Rex Lee, 2010–2022
- Constandinos Himonas, 2015–2022
- John A. Pearce, 2015–2025
- Paige Petersen, 2017–present
- Diana Hagen, 2022–2026
- Jill Pohlman, 2022–present
- John Nielsen, 2025–present
- Stephen Dent, 2026–present
- Jay Jorgensen, 2026–present
- Matthew Bell, 2026–present
- Michael Menssen, 2026–present
