= A. H. Ellett =

American judge

Albert Hayden Ellett (February 4, 1898 – November 30, 1986) was a justice of the Utah Supreme Court from 1967 to 1979, serving as chief justice from 1976 to 1979.

Born in Huntsville, Alabama, Ellett was largely raised in Texas. He received a B.A. from the University of Utah, and worked as a teacher and an accountant before receiving his law degree from Blackstone College of Law in Chicago, and gaining admission to the bar in 1930. In 1934, he was elected to a seat on the Salt Lake City Court, and in 1940, he was elected to the Utah Third District Court. On January 6, 1967, Governor Cal Rampton appointed Ellett to a seat on the Utah Supreme Court vacated by the death of Roger I. McDonough.

Ellett was married twice, first to Florence Rowe of Spanish Fork from August 20, 1924, until her death on January 5, 1975, and then to Miriam Parker, on December 27, 1975. Ellett died at Salt Lake City hospital following a heart attack.

Political offices
Preceded by Roger I. McDonough	Justice of the Utah Supreme Court; 1967–1976	Succeeded by Gordon R. Hall
Preceded by F. Henri Henriod	Chief Justice of the Utah Supreme Court; 1976–1979	Succeeded by J. Allen Crockett
