= Richard C. Howe =

American judge (1924–2021)

Chief Justice of the Utah Supreme Court
- In office 1998–2002
- Appointed by: Gov. Scott M. Matheson
- Preceded by: Michael David Zimmerman
- Succeeded by: Christine M. Durham

Personal details
- Born: January 20, 1924 South Cottonwood, Utah, U.S.
- Died: June 19, 2021 (aged 97) Murray, Utah, U.S.
- Education: University of Utah (BS, LLB)

Richard Cuddy Howe (January 20, 1924 – June 19, 2021) was an American politician and judge. At the time of his retirement in 2003, he was the only person in Utah history to serve as a member of the State House of Representatives, the State Senate, and the State Supreme Court. He served on the Utah Supreme Court from 1980 to 2002, and was the Chief Justice of the Utah Supreme Court from 1998 to April 2002.

== Life and career ==
Born in South Cottonwood, Utah, Howe attended Woodstock Elementary School in Murray, and graduated from Granite High School. He received a B.S. degree in speech from the University of Utah in 1943, and received his law degree from the University of Utah College of Law in 1948.

Howe was a member of the Church of Jesus Christ of Latter-day Saints. He and Juanita Lyon were married in the Salt Lake Temple with the marriage performed by John A. Widstoe. He served in multiple positions in The Church including as the first bishop of the Murray 11th ward, a member of the South Cottonwood Stake Presidency and a regional representative of the 12 apostles.

His brother, Allan Turner Howe, was a one-term U.S. Representative from Utah.

Howe served eighteen years in the Utah State Legislature as a Democrat: six terms in the Utah House of Representatives from 1951 to 1958, and from 1969 to 1972, and two terms in the Utah Senate, from 1972 to 1978. During this time he served as a Judge in the Murray City Court from 1953 to 1955, and as Speaker of the House from 1971 to 1972.

In December 1980, Utah Governor Scott M. Matheson appointed Howe to a seat on the Utah Supreme Court vacated by the resignation of Justice D. Frank Wilkins. Howe served as Associate Chief Justice from 1988 to 1993, and became chief justice in March 1998. He also served as the Judicial Council's representative on the Utah State Retirement Membership Council. Howe retired on December 31, 2002, and was succeeded on the Court by Jill Parrish.

He died on June 19, 2021, in Murray, Utah, at age 97.
