= Lester A. Wade =

American judge (1889–1966)

Lester A. Wade (July 8, 1889 – June 7, 1966) was a justice of the Utah Supreme Court from 1943 until his death in 1966, and was chief justice from 1961 to 1963.

Born in Weber County, Utah Wade "received a J.D. degree from the University of Chicago Law School in 1917, and practiced law in Twin Falls, Idaho. He served as a state district court judge from his election in 1932 to 1942.

Initially appointed to the Supreme Court in 1943 on a temporary basis during the absence of Justice Eugene E. Pratt due to military service during World War II, Wade was permanently appointed by Governor Herbert B. Maw in 1944, to a seat vacated by the death of Justice David W. Moffat. Wade was then elected to the seat later that year.

In 1952, Wade defeated a challenge from George W. Worthen (who would later be appointed to a vacancy on the court), and in 1962 Wade was re-elected unopposed.

Political offices
Preceded by David W. Moffat	Justice of the Utah Supreme Court; 1943–1966	Succeeded by R. L. Tuckett
