= List of first women lawyers and judges in Utah =

This is a list of the first women lawyer(s) and judge(s) in Utah. It includes the year in which the women were admitted to practice law (in parentheses). Also included are women who achieved other distinctions such becoming the first in their state to graduate from law school or become a political figure.

== Firsts in Utah's history ==
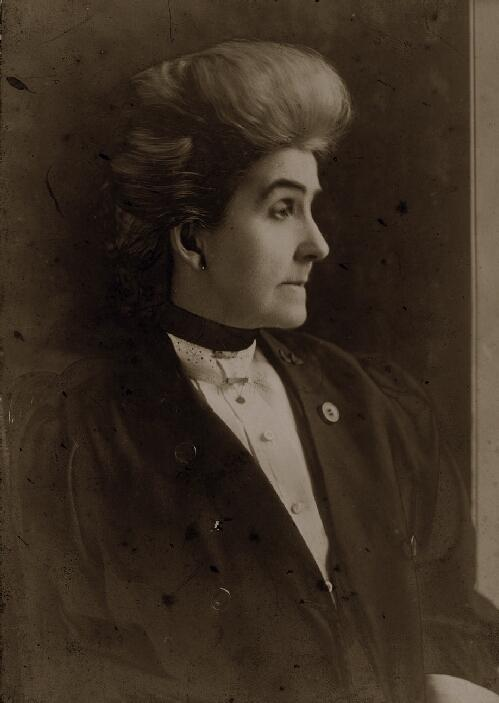
Phoebe Couzins: One of the first female lawyers in Utah (1872)

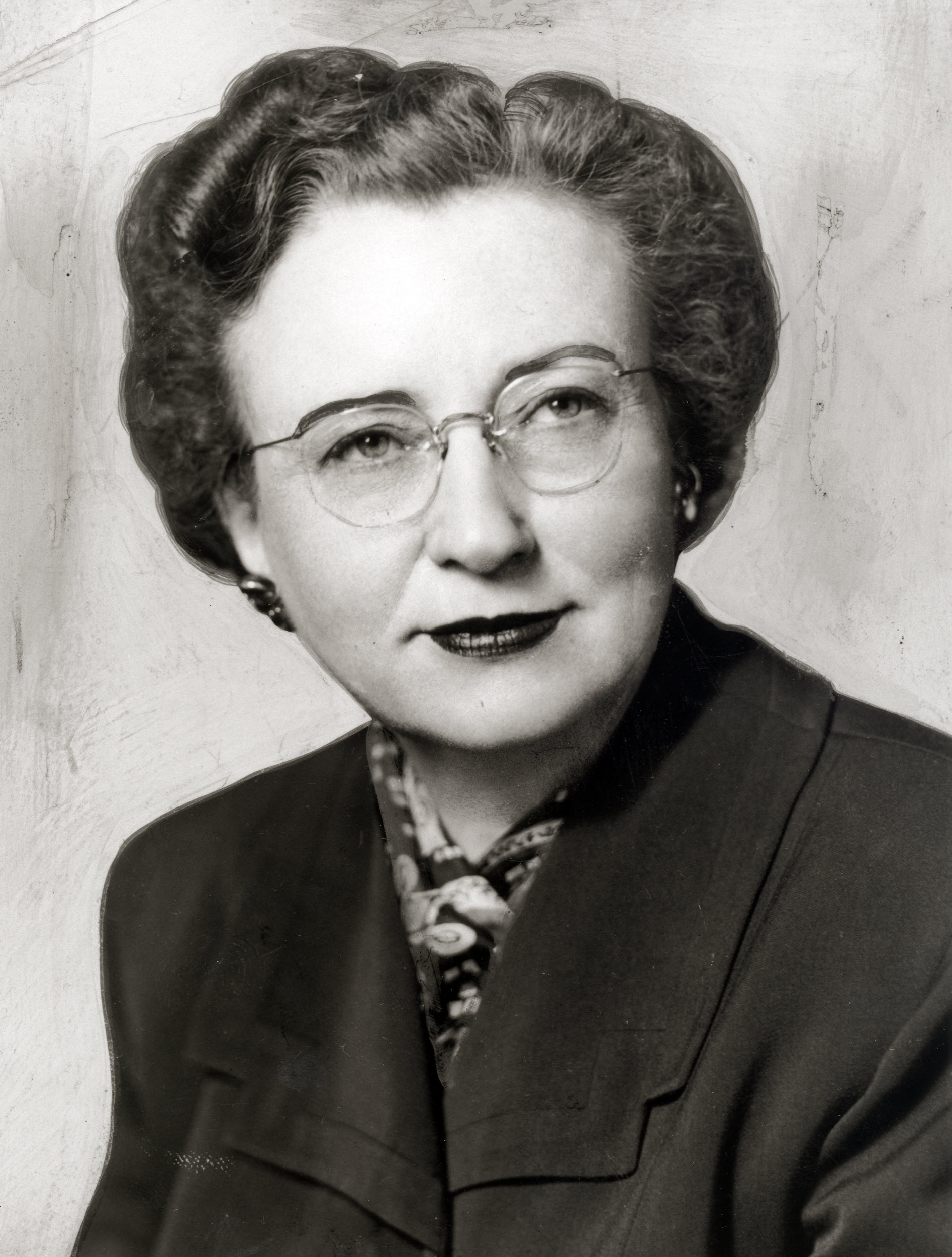
Reva Bosone: First female judge in Utah (1936)

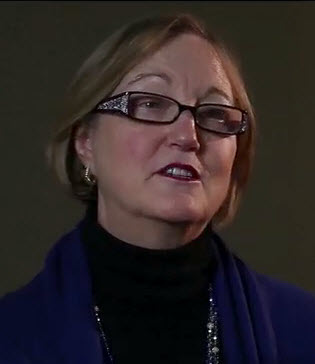
Christine M. Durham: First female Justice (1982) and Chief Justice (2002) of the Utah Supreme Court

=== Lawyers ===
- First females: Phoebe Couzins and Cora Georgiana Snow Carleton (1872)
- First female from Utah to practice before the U.S. Supreme Court: Agnes Swan around 1912
- First female to practice before the U. S. District Court for the District of Utah: Beryl Bonner Meyers (1926)
- First Asian American female: Eunice Chen (1973)
- First Native American female: Mary Ellen Sloan (1975)
- First Hispanic American female: Sheila K. McCleve (1977)
- First African American female: Denise M. Mercherson (1979)
- First Tongan American female: T. Laura Lui (2005)

=== State judges ===
- First female: Reva Beck Bosone (1930) in 1936
- First female (Third Judicial District): Christine M. Durham (1978)
- First female (Utah Supreme Court): Christine M. Durham (1978) in 1982
- First Hispanic American female: Frances M. Palacios (1980) in 1992
- First Hispanic American (female) (district court): Denise Posse-Blanco Lindberg in 1998
- First African American female: Shauna Graves-Robertson (1990) in 1999
- First female (Fourth Judicial District): Claudia Laycock in 2001
- First female (Chief Justice; Utah Supreme Court): Christine M. Durham (1978) in 2002
- First female (Tenth Circuit Court of Appeals): Carolyn B. McHugh (1982) in 2014
- First openly LGBT (female): Camille Neider in 2017

=== Federal judges ===
- First female (U.S. Bankruptcy Court): Judith Boulden (1974) in 1988
- First female (U.S. District Court for the District of Utah): Tena Campbell (1977) in 1995
- First Native American (female) (Magistrate; U.S. District Court for the District of Utah): Cecilia Romero in 2019

=== Attorney General ===
- First female: Jan Graham (1980) from 1993 to 2001

=== Assistant Attorney General ===
- First female: Mary J. Colbath in 1965

=== United States Attorney ===
- First Latino American female (Acting United States Attorney for the District of Utah): Andrea T. Martinez in 2021
- First female (Presidentially-appointed United States Attorney for the District of Utah): Trina A. Higgins in 2022

=== Bar Associations ===
- First female president (Utah State Bar): Pamela Greenwood (1972) in 1990
- First minority (female) president (Utah State Bar): Angelina Tsu in 2015
- First female president (Utah chapter–Federal Bar Association): Christine Fitzgerald Soltis (1975)

== Firsts in local history ==
- Claudia Laycock: First female district court judge in Juab, Millard, Utah and Wasatch Counties, Utah (2001)
- Christine M. Durham (1978): First female district court judge for Salt Lake, Summit and Tooele Counties, Utah (1978)
- Cheryl Ann Russell (1976): First female lawyer in Logan, Utah [Cache County, Utah]
- Reva Beck Bosone (1930): First female lawyer in Carbon County, Utah
- Patricia Geary: First female to become the County Attorney for Emery County, Utah (c. 1992)
- Rebekah W. Hornbein (c. 1915): First female law graduate from the University of Utah [Salt Lake County, Utah]
- Margret Sidwell Taylor (1970): First female to work as a lawyer for the Public Defender's Office for Salt Lake County, Utah
- Sheila K. McCleve (1977): First female to work as a full-time prosecutor in Salt Lake City, Utah
- Patricia J. Marlowe (1973): First female to serve as the Deputy County Attorney for Salt Lake City, Utah [Salt Lake County, Utah]
- Lisa Garner: First female to serve as a Judge of the Draper Justice Court (2022) [Salt Lake and Utah Counties, Utah]
- Elizabeth Kronk Warner: First (Native American) female to serve as the Dean of the S.J. Quinney College of Law (2019)
- Barbara G. Hjelle: First resident female lawyer in Washington County, Utah
- Karla Staheli: First female judge in Fifth District Court serving Juvenile Court in Washington County, Utah

== See also ==
- List of first women lawyers and judges in the United States
- Timeline of women lawyers in the United States
- Women in law

== Other topics of interest ==
- List of first minority male lawyers and judges in the United States
- List of first minority male lawyers and judges in Utah
