= Abe W. Turner =

American judge (1893–1947)

Justice pro tempore of the Utah Supreme Court
- In office March 14, 1944 – February 18, 1946
- Governor: J. Bracken Lee

Personal details
- Born: April 26, 1893 Heber City, Utah, United States
- Died: May 25, 1947 (aged 54)

Abe W. Turner (April 26, 1893 – May 25, 1947) was a justice of the Utah Supreme Court from 1944 to 1946.

Born in Heber City, Utah, Turner attended the University of Utah and received a degree from Georgetown University in 1916, gaining admission to the Utah State Bar on October 9, 1916. He was in private practice until 1931, when he became City Attorney of Provo. In 1932, he was elected to a seat on the Fourth Judicial District, thereafter winning reelection in 1936 and 1940.

On March 14, 1944, Governor J. Bracken Lee named Turner a justice pro tempore of the Supreme Court of Utah, where Turner remained until February 18, 1946.

After leaving the court, Turner resumed private practice in Provo, Utah, until his death at the age of 54.

Political offices
Preceded by David W. Moffat	Justice of the Utah Supreme Court; 1944–1946	Succeeded by Roger I. McDonough
