= Richard J. Maughan =

American judge (1917–1981)

Chief Justice of the Supreme Court of Utah
- In office 1981–1981
- Preceded by: J. Allen Crockett
- Succeeded by: Gordon R. Hall

Associate Justice of the Supreme Court of Utah
- In office January 5, 1975 – July 8, 1981
- Preceded by: E. R. Callister Jr.
- Succeeded by: Christine M. Durham

Personal details
- Born: November 13, 1917; Logan, Utah, U.S.
- Died: July 8, 1981 (aged 63); Salt Lake City, Utah, U.S.
- Political party: Democratic

Richard Johnson Maughan (November 13, 1917 – July 8, 1981) was an American judge who served as an Associate Justice of the Supreme Court of Utah from 1975 to 1981 and as Chief Justice of the Supreme Court of Utah in 1981.

Born in Cache Valley, Maughan received a JD from the University of Utah and was admitted to the bar in 1951. He was an Assistant State Attorney General in Utah from 1951 to 1969. In 1968 he was an unsuccessful candidate for the United States House of Representatives for Utah's 1st congressional district. Maughan ran as a Democrat, and was defeated in a landslide by Republican incumbent Laurence J. Burton, who received over 68% of the vote with 139,456 votes to Maughan's 65,265.

The following year, however, Maughan was appointed to the Utah State Board of Higher Education. In 1974, Maughan ran for a seat on the Utah Supreme Court, defeating incumbent E. R. Callister Jr.

Political offices
Preceded by E. R. Callister Jr.	Justice of the Utah Supreme Court; 1975–1981	Succeeded by Christine M. Durham
