= William McCarty =

William McCarty may refer to:

- William M. McCarty, U.S. Representative from Virginia
- William M. McCarty (judge), Utah Supreme Court justice
- William Tibertus McCarty, American Roman Catholic clergyman
- William Bonner McCarty, founder of the Jitney Jungle

== See also ==
- William McCarthy (disambiguation)
