= F. Henri Henriod =

American judge (1905–1986)

Chief Justice of the Utah Supreme Court
- In office 1963–1974

Associate Justice of the Utah Supreme Court
- In office 1951–1963

Personal details
- Born: 1905 American Fork, Utah
- Died: September 9, 1986 (aged 80–81) Salt Lake City, Utah
- Education: University of Utah (BA); Harvard Law School (JD)
- Occupation: jurist

F. Henri Henriod (1905 – September 9, 1986) was a justice of the Utah Supreme Court from 1951 to 1976, and was chief justice from 1963 to 1967, and from 1975 to 1976.

== Biography ==
Born in American Fork, Utah, Henroid received his undergraduate degree from the University of Utah and a J.D. from Harvard Law School. He served as president of the Young Republican league of Utah, and as Republican chairman of Salt Lake County.

In World War II, Henriod "was an intelligence officer and attorney for the Army while serving in Europe".

On June 20, 1951, Henriod was appointed by Governor J. Bracken Lee to a seat on the state supreme court vacated by the resignation of George W. Latimer, who had left to join the United States military court of appeals.

He had a decision reversed by the U.S. Supreme court. He was forced to retire by law enacted while he was in office.

Henriod died in Salt Lake City at the age of 81.

Political offices
Preceded by George W. Latimer	Justice of the Utah Supreme Court; 1951–1976	Succeeded by A. H. Ellett
