= Justice Thurman =

Justice Thurman may refer to:

- Allen G. Thurman (1813–1895), associate justice of the Ohio Supreme Court
- Samuel R. Thurman (1850–1941), associate justice of the Utah Supreme Court
