= Justice Hanson =

Justice Hanson may refer to:

- Charles S. Hanson (1912–after 1984), associate justice of the South Dakota Supreme Court
- Ephraim Hanson (1872–1952), associate justice of the Utah Supreme Court
- George M. Hanson (1856–1924), associate justice of the Maine Supreme Judicial Court
- Sam Hanson (born 1939), associate justice of the Minnesota Supreme Court

== See also ==
- Justice Hansen (disambiguation)
