= Justice Cherry =

Justice Cherry may refer to:

- James W. Cherry (1872–1949), associate justice of the Utah Supreme Court
- Michael Cherry (judge) (born 1944), associate justice of the Supreme Court of Nevada
