= Obed F. Strickland =

American judge (1833–1887)

Obed Francis Strickland

Associate Justice of the Supreme Court of the Utah Territory
- In office 1869–1873
- Governor: Charles Durkee
- Preceded by: Enos D. Hoge
- Succeeded by: Phillip H. Emerson

Judge in the Third Circuit of the Utah Territory
- In office 1867–1869
- Governor: Charles Durkee

Probate Judge of Madison County, Montana
- In office 1865–1866

Personal details
- Born: April 3, 1833 Dansville, New York, United States
- Died: June 28, 1887 (aged 54) St. Johns, Michigan, United States
- Party: Union

Obed Francis Strickland (April 3, 1833 – June 28, 1887) was a justice of the Supreme Court of the Utah Territory from 1869 to 1873.

== Biography ==
Born in Dansville, New York, Strickland was a Freemason who moved to the Montana Territory with a promise of wealth from mining. He moved to the Utah Territory in May 1866, and reached the rank of Grand Master in 1872. He founded Wasatch Lodge No. 1 in Salt Lake City with Reuben H. Robertson, whom he had worked with in Montana previously.

Strickland practiced law as early as 1865 in Madison County, Montana, where he served as a probate judge and attorney. He became a judge who served on the Third District Court of the Utah Territory, and later served on the Supreme Court of the Utah Territory from 1869 until 1873. After Strickland's term as associate justice ended, it was claimed by a local newspaper that he paid for his position for $2,800 (US$65,000 in today's money) through a payment to Thomas J. Drake, who sued Strickland in court.

He left Utah in 1882, and died suddenly from heart disease in St. Johns, Michigan, at the age of 54. He is buried at DeWitt City Cemetery in DeWitt, Michigan.

Political offices
| Preceded by Enos D. Hoge | Justice of the Utah Territorial Supreme Court; 1869–1873 | Succeeded by Phillip H. Emerson |
