= Rolapp =

Rolapp is a surname. Notable people with the surname include:

- Brian Rolapp (born 1972), American chief executive officer of the PGA Tour
- Henry H. Rolapp (1860–1936), American justice of the Supreme Court of the Utah Territory
