= Justice Crockett =

Justice Crockett may refer to:

- J. Allen Crockett (1906–1994), associate justice of the Utah Supreme Court
- Joseph B. Crockett (1808–1884), associate justice of the Supreme Court of California
