= Justice McCurdy =

Justice McCurdy may refer to:

- Charles J. McCurdy (1797–1891), associate justice of the Connecticut Supreme Court
- Solomon P. McCurdy (1820–1890), associate justice of the Utah Territorial Supreme Court
