= Justice Hansen =

Justice Hansen may refer to:

- Connor Hansen (1913–1987), associate justice of the Wisconsin Supreme Court
- Elias Hansen (judge) (1877–1966), associate justice and chief justice of the Utah Supreme Court
- Robert W. Hansen (1911–1997), associate justice of the Wisconsin Supreme Court
- Justice Hansen (American football) (born 1995), American football player

== See also ==
- Judge Hansen (disambiguation)
- Justice Hanson (disambiguation)
