= E. R. Callister Jr. =

American judge

Chief Justice of the Supreme Court of Utah
- In office 1971–1975
- Preceded by: J. Allen Crockett
- Succeeded by: F. Henri Henriod

Associate Justice of the Supreme Court of Utah
- In office 1959–1975
- Appointed by: George Dewey Clyde
- Preceded by: George W. Worthen
- Succeeded by: Richard J. Maughan

10th Attorney General of Utah
- In office January 5, 1953 – 1959
- Governor: J. Bracken Lee; George Dewey Clyde
- Preceded by: Clinton D. Vernon
- Succeeded by: Walter L. Budge

Personal details
- Born: Edward Richard Callister Jr. September 30, 1916; Salt Lake City, Utah
- Died: October 28, 1980 (aged 64); Salt Lake City, Utah
- Political party: Republican

Edward Richard Callister Jr. (September 30, 1916 – October 28, 1980) was an American lawyer and politician who served as the Attorney General of Utah from 1953 to 1959, and was an Associate Justice of the Supreme Court of Utah from 1959 to 1975, serving as Chief Justice of the Supreme Court of Utah from 1971 to 1975.

His grandfather was Edward H. Callister, a newspaper man who was manager of The Salt Lake Herald-Republican Publishing Company, whose own parents emigrated from the Isle of Man in the 19th century.
