= George W. Bartch =

American judge (1849–1927)

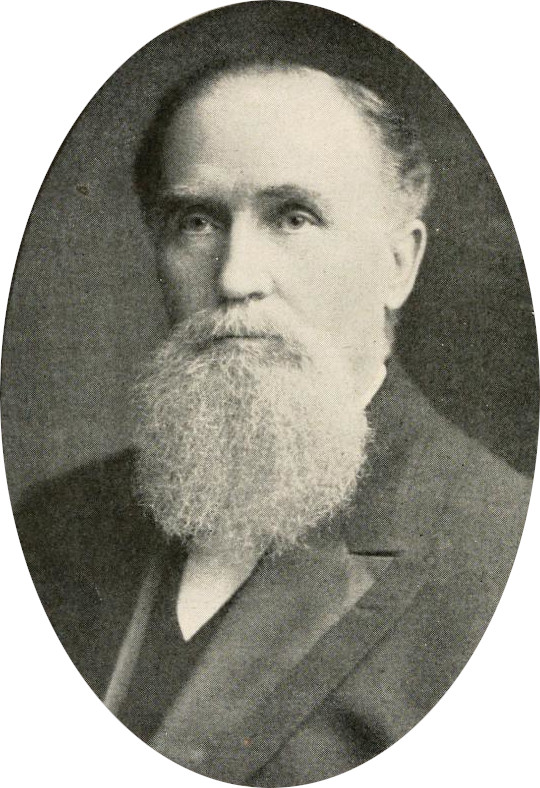
- Born: March 15, 1849; Dushore, Pennsylvania
- Died: March 15, 1927 (aged 78); Salt Lake City, Utah
- Known for: Justice of the Utah Supreme Court

George Washington Bartch (March 15, 1849 – March 15, 1927) was a lawyer and land speculator who served as a justice of the Utah Territorial Supreme Court from 1893 to 1894 and of the Utah Supreme Court from 1896 to 1906. He served as chief justice from 1899 to 1901 and from 1905 to 1906.

Born in Dushore, Pennsylvania, Bartch received an M.S. from the Pennsylvania State Normal School in 1873. While working as Superintendent of Schools at Shenandoah, Pennsylvania, he read law, gaining admission to the bar in 1884. After practicing in Bloomsburg, Pennsylvania, from 1886 to 1888, Bartch moved to Canon City, Colorado, where he met John W. Blackburn, the pair then moving to Salt Lake City in March 1888 to establish a new firm. He was a Freemason, being a member of Wasatch Lodge No. 1 of the Free and Accepted Masons of Utah, having gone through the three degrees sometime during the year prior to 1894 Proceedings of that Grand Lodge where he is listed as a member; subsequent records of annual proceedings show that he remained a Freemason for the rest of his life.

Bartch died at his home in Salt Lake City, on his 78th birthday. The Utah State Historical Society has a collection of his papers.

Political offices
Preceded by John W. Blackburn	Justice of the Utah Territorial Supreme Court; 1893–1894	Succeeded by William H. King
Political offices
Preceded by Newly established court	Justice of the Utah Supreme Court; 1896–1906	Succeeded by Joseph E. Frick
