= Albert J. Weber =

American judge (1859–1925)

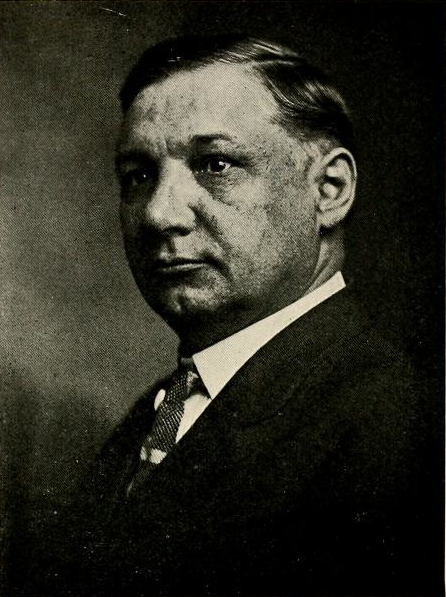
- Born: November 19, 1859; West Point, Iowa
- Died: August 8, 1925 (aged 65); East Millcreek, Utah
- Known for: Justice of the Utah Supreme Court

Albert J. Weber (November 19, 1859 – August 8, 1925) was a justice of the Utah Supreme Court from 1919 to 1925, and was chief justice of the Utah Supreme Court from 1923 to 1925.

== Early life, education, and career ==
Born in West Point, Iowa, to Henry and Christine Weber, he graduated from the Iowa Wesleyan University in 1880. He entered the newspaper business, but later began preparation for the bar. Admitted to the Iowa bar in 1884 he moved to Ogden, Utah, in 1889 and entered the practice of law. He was twice elected county attorney of Weber County, Utah, in 1892 and 1894, and was an unsuccessful candidate for Utah Attorney General in 1895.

Elected to the state supreme court as a Democrat, Weber "wrote the decisions in a large number of the most important and far-reaching cases that came before that tribunal". In January 1923, he was elevated to chief justice, assuming the duties of that office without a formal ceremony.

He was a Freemason, being a member of Weber Lodge No. 4 of the Free and Accepted Masons of Utah, having gone through the three degrees sometime prior to the 1895 proceedings of that grand lodge where he is listed as a member. Sometime during the year prior to the 1915 Annual Grand Proceedings of Utah, Weber had demitted (or resigned) from his membership in Weber Lodge, and later became a member of Argenta Lodge No. 3, which is also chartered under the Grand Lodge of Utah; he remained a Mason for the rest of his life.

== Later life and death ==
In failing health since early in 1924, Weber made an extended trip to southern California to regain his strength, and later in the year visited the Great Lakes country, Montreal, Canada, and New York City, consulting eminent specialists in the various cities, but obtained only temporary benefit. In the latter part of 1924 he recovered enough to fill his position on the bench a considerable portion of the time. Retiring as chief justice at the close of the year, Weber administered the oath of office to his successor on January 5, 1925. Weber was appointed referee in bankruptcy by Tillman D. Johnson of the United States district court. He opened offices in the Commercial building and was able to attend to his official business until ten days before his death, when he left his office for the last time.

Weber died shortly after 11 o'clock in the morning at his country home in Mill Creek at the age of 66, after a long illness due to a complication of diseases.

Political offices
Preceded by Elmer E. Corfman	Chief Justice of the Utah Supreme Court; 1923–1925	Succeeded by Valentine Gideon
Preceded by Joseph E. Frick	Justice of the Utah Supreme Court; 1919–1925	Succeeded by D. Newton Straup
