= William H. Folland =

American judge (c. 1878–1941)

William H. Folland (c. 1878 – June 4, 1941) was an associate justice of the Utah Supreme Court from 1929 to 1937 and chief justice from 1937 to 1939. He was a Republican.

He was a native of Salt Lake City. He belonged to the LDS Church and was a missionary to Wales from 1800 to 1903. He worked as a court reporter in 1905. He graduated from the University of Utah Law School. He served as president of the Salt Lake Stock Exchange.

He lost election to the Utah Supreme Court in 1938.

Political offices
Preceded by Samuel R. Thurman	Associate Justice of the Utah Supreme Court; 1929–1937	Succeeded by Martin M. Larson
Preceded by Elias Hansen	Chief Justice of the Utah Supreme Court; 1937–1939	Succeeded by David W. Moffat
