= Samuel R. Thurman =

American judge (1850–1941)

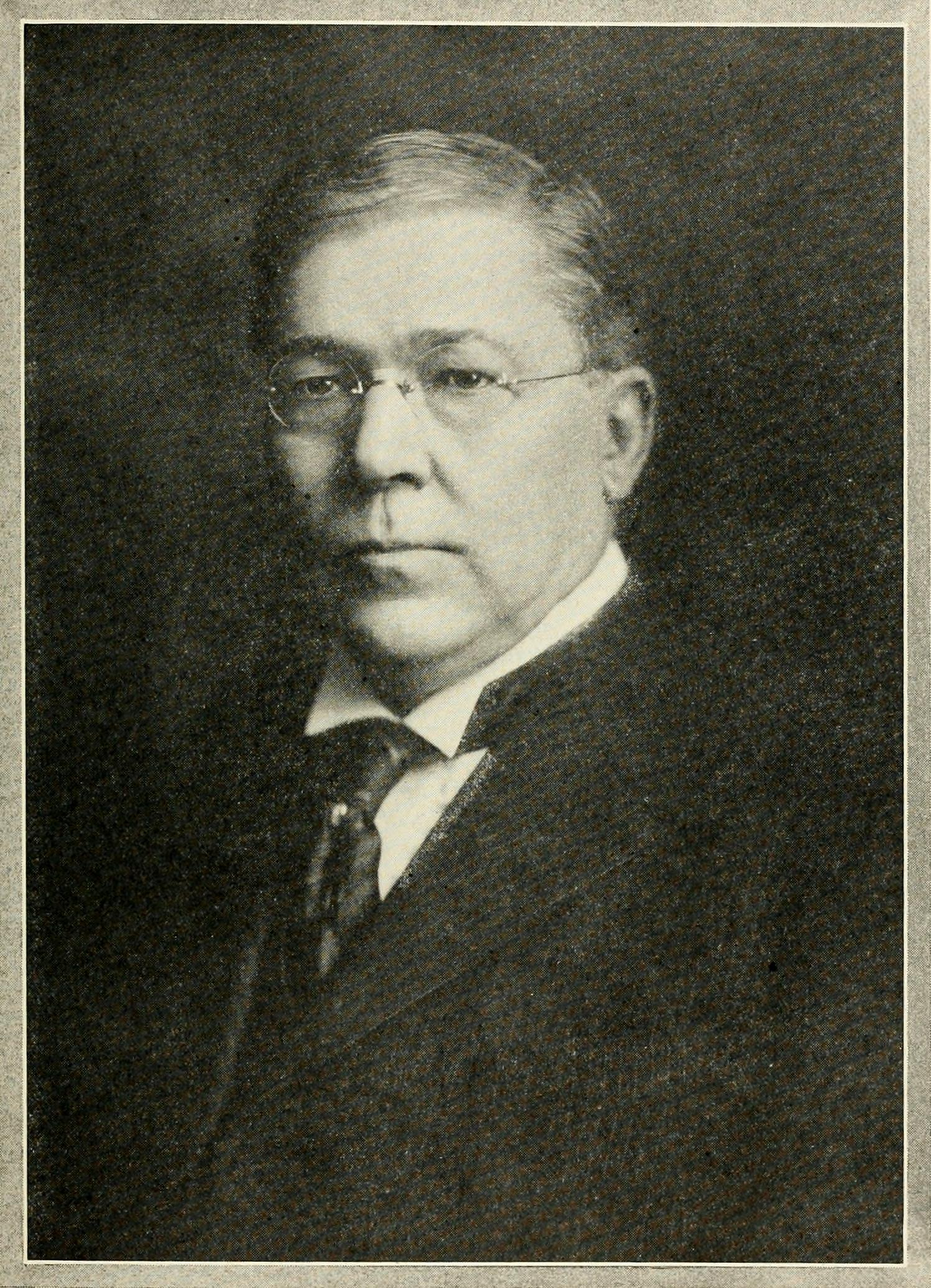
Samuel R. Thurman.

Samuel R. Thurman (1850 – July 12, 1941) was a justice of the Utah Supreme Court from 1917 to 1929, serving as chief justice from 1927 to 1929. He was a member of The Church of Jesus Christ of Latter-day Saints.

== Early life, education, and career ==
Born in Kentucky, Thurman moved to Lehi, Utah in 1870, at age 20. His older brother George W. Thurman was Lehi City Attorney at the time, but was shot and killed at a New Year's Eve party in 1871. The younger Thurman studied at Brigham Young Academy and Deseret University (later the University of Utah).

Thurman married Isabella Karren, a native of Lehi. He worked as a school teacher and also studied law. In 1879 he was admitted to the practice of law in Utah, and then traveled to the University of Michigan where he earned a law degree. He was part of a significant number of Utah Latter Day Saints going to study law at the University of Michigan in this time period.

== Political career ==
In February 1881, shortly after his return from Ann Arbor, Thurman was elected mayor of Lehi, Utah. He was reelected mayor in 1882, but in November 1882 resigned as mayor and moved to Provo to practice law full time. In 1884 he formed a partnership with David Evans Jr. In 1886 Evans became an assistant U.S. attorney, and Thurman formed a partnership with George Sutherland. They later included William H. King as their third partner. In the early 1890s, the partnership included Edgar A. Wedgwood, who later served as adjutant general of the Utah National Guard.

From 1882 until 1890 Thurman was a member of the Utah Territorial Legislature. Also in the 1880s Thurman became involved in trying to form the Democratic Party in Utah. He was the party nominee for Territorial Delegate to Congress, losing to the People's Party candidate, John T. Caine. In 1887 Thurman became a polygamist by marrying his second wife Victoria Adelaine Hodgart. He was arrested for unlawful cohabitation in 1889, but left on a mission for The Church of Jesus Christ of Latter-day Saints to England before he was prosecuted.

He was made an assistant U.S. attorney in 1893 by President Grover Cleveland. In 1895 he was a delegate to the Utah Constitutional Convention and one of the strong advocates, along with Republican John Henry Smith, of the vote for women in that convention. Thurman also "eloquently pleaded for reducing the twelve-person jury as an economy measure that would not jeopardize justice for the accused".

For much of the next twenty years Thurman was chair of the Utah Democratic Party. He moved to Salt Lake City in 1906 where he formed the partnership of Wedgewood, Thurman and Irvine that specialized in irrigation law. He also from 1893 to 1912 worked in the legal department of the Denver and Rio Grande Railroad.

== Judicial career ==
In 1916 Thurman became a member of the Utah Supreme Court, and was made Chief Justice of that court in 1927.

Political offices
Preceded by Daniel N. Straup	Associate Justice of the Utah Supreme Court; 1917–1927	Succeeded by William H. Folland
Preceded by Valentine Gideon	Chief Justice of the Utah Supreme Court; 1927–1929	Succeeded by James W. Cherry
