= William McCarthy =

William McCarthy may refer to:

- Bill McCarthy (Australian rules footballer) (1874–1940), Australian rules footballer
- Bill McCarthy (baseball) (1886–1928), American baseball player
- Bill McCarthy (NHS), Policy Director NHS England
- Bill McCarthy (politician) (1923–1987), Australian politician
- Bill McCarthy (dual player), Irish hurler and Gaelic footballer.
- W. H. L. McCarthy (1885–1962), Irish–British physician and British Army officer
- William C. McCarthy (1820–1900), American mayor
- William J. McCarthy (1919–1998), American labor leader
- William T. McCarthy (1885–1964), American federal judge
- William McCarthy, Baron McCarthy (1925–2012), British politician
- William McCarthy (baseball) (1882–1939), American baseball player

== See also ==
- William McCarty (disambiguation)
