= Eugene E. Pratt =

American judge (c. 1892–1970)

Eugene E. Pratt (c. 1892 – August 28, 1970) was a justice of the Utah Supreme Court from 1939 to 1951, and was chief justice from 1949 to 1951.

Pratt received his undergraduate degree from the University of Utah, and his law degree from Stanford University.

From 1929 to 1937, Pratt served as a trial court judge in Ogden, Utah.

On January 3, 1939, Governor Henry H. Blood appointed Pratt to a seat on the state supreme court vacated by the resignation of Justice Ephraim Hanson, due to poor health. Among Pratt's law clerks was M. Blaine Peterson, who later served in the United States House of Representatives. Pratt served on the court until 1951, when he failed to regain the Democratic nomination.

Pratt died of natural causes in Miami, Florida, at the age of 78.

Political offices
Preceded by Ephraim Hanson	Justice of the Utah Supreme Court; 1939–1951	Succeeded by James H. Wolfe
