= Russon (surname) =

Russon is a surname. Notable people with the surname include:

- Alice Russon, Irish actress, singer, and dancer
- John Russon (born 1960), Canadian philosopher
- Leonard Russon, American judge
- Penni Russon (born 1974), Australian writer of children's literature and young adult fiction
- Bobby Russon (born 1983), Canadian criminal and civil liberties lawyer.
