= Justice Hoge =

Justice Hoge may refer to:

- Enos D. Hoge (1831–1912), associate justice of the Territorial Utah Supreme Court
- Solomon L. Hoge (1836–1909), associate justice of the South Carolina Supreme Court
