= Nehring =

Nehring is a surname. Notable people with the surname include:

- Alfred Nehring (1845—1904), German zoologist and paleontologist
- Dennis Nehring, American politician
- Ronald E. Nehring (1947–2019), American judge
- Walther Nehring (1892—1983), German World War II general

== See also ==
- Nehring's blind mole-rat
