= Justice Stiles =

Justice Stiles may refer to:

- George P. Stiles (1814–1885), associate justice of the Utah Territorial Supreme Court
- Theodore L. Stiles (1848–1925), associate justice of the Washington Supreme Court
