= William M. McCarty (judge) =

American judge (1859–1918)

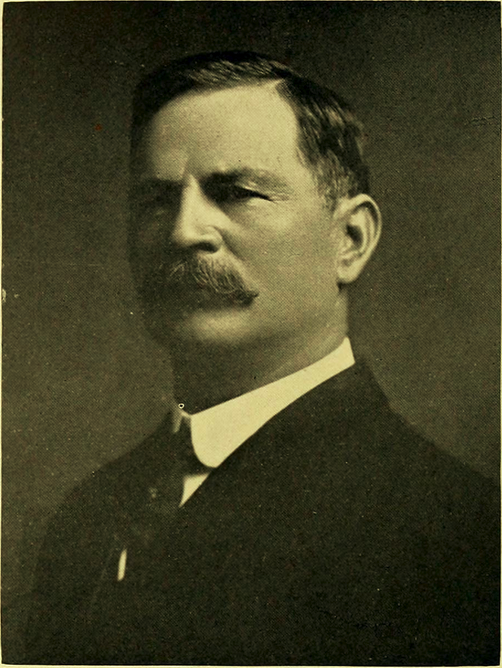

Justice of the Utah Supreme Court
- In office 1903–1918

Personal details
- Born: William Murdock McCarty; May 15, 1859 Alpine, Utah, US
- Died: December 19, 1918 (aged 59) Salt Lake City, Utah, US
- Party: Republican
- Spouse: Lovina L. Murray
- Children: 4
- Education: Brigham Young Academy

William Murdock McCarty (May 15, 1859 – December 19, 1918) was a justice of the Utah Supreme Court from 1903 to 1918.

== Biography ==
William Murdock McCarty was born in Alpine, Utah on May 15, 1859, to James Hardwick McCarty and Lydia Margaret Cragun McCarty. He attended Brigham Young Academy in 1881 and 1882, after finishing the public schools. He began the practice of law early in life, studying law while engaged in the work of driving a wagon freight team between points in Utah and the mines of Nevada. Ploche and Bristol were two of the principal points to which he carried products of the farm for the miners. At night in the camping places, some of which were along the old road in the Escalante desert, McCarty studied his law books while companions played cards or "told yarns".

McCarty was assistant United States prosecuting attorney in the Beaver district of the Utah Territory, which included his then home county of Sevier. In 1895 he was elected judge of the Sixth district, which embraced the counties of Sevier, Wayne, Piute, Garfield and Kane. He assumed his office in January 1896, upon the admission of Utah to statehood. In 1900 he was reelected to the Sixth district bench and had served two years of his four-year term when, in 1902, he was elected to the state supreme court. He was reelected in 1908 and in 1914, the term being for six years and in which he was serving at the time of his death. Had he lived, he would have begun a third term as chief justice the following month, the others having been served from 1906 to 1908 and from 1912 to 1914. He was a Republican in politics.

He was a Freemason, being a member of Story Lodge No. 4 of the Free and Accepted Masons of Utah, having been initiated sometime during the year prior to the 1897 Proceedings of that Grand Lodge where he is listed as an Entered Apprentice; he remained an Entered Apprentice through the next year, but is not recorded in the Grand Lodge's Annual Proceedings as having continued through the other two degrees of Masonry.

McCarty married Lovina L. Murray, with whom he had four children that survived him. He died at his Salt Lake home on December 19, 1918, after an illness of several weeks of bronchial pneumonia.

Political offices
Preceded by James A. Minor	Justice of the Utah Supreme Court; 1903–1918	Succeeded by Joseph E. Frick
