= Diana Hagen =

American judge

Justice of the Utah Supreme Court
- In office May 18, 2022 – May 8, 2026
- Appointed by: Spencer Cox
- Preceded by: Constandinos Himonas
- Succeeded by: Michael Menssen

Personal details
- Born: Ogden, Utah, U.S.
- Education: University of Utah (BA, JD)

Diana Hagen is an American lawyer who served as a justice on the Utah Supreme Court from 2022 to 2026. She served as a judge of the Utah Court of Appeals from 2017 to 2022.

== Education ==
Hagen attended Ben Lomond High School. She received a Bachelor of Arts in speech Communication from the University of Utah and a Juris Doctor from the S.J. Quinney College of Law in 1998, graduating Order of the Coif.

== Legal and academic career ==
Hagen served a law clerk for Judge Tena Campbell of the United States District Court for the District of Utah. She then practiced as an attorney with Parr, Waddoups, Brown, Gee & Loveless in Salt Lake City. She later served as an Assistant United States Attorney and served as chief of the Appellate Section then later becoming First Assistant United States Attorney. As a federal prosecutor, Hagen handled many high profile cases, such as the Elizabeth Smart kidnapping case. Hagen was also an adjunct professor of law at the University of Utah, where she taught courses on appellate practice and advocacy and also coached intercollegiate moot court teams.

== Judicial career ==
=== Utah Court of Appeals service ===
On June 23, 2017, Utah Governor Gary Herbert appointed Hagen to the Utah Court of Appeals to fill the vacancy left by the retirement of Judge J. Frederic Voros Jr.

=== Utah Supreme Court service ===
On February 28, 2022, Hagen's name was among seven submitted to the governor from the Appellate Judicial Nominating Commission. On March 29, 2022, Governor Spencer Cox nominated Hagen to serve as a justice of the Supreme Court of Utah Governor Cox nominated Hagen to the seat vacated by Justice Constandinos Himonas, who resigned on March 1, 2022. On May 11, 2022, Hagen appeared before the Utah Senate Judicial Confirmation Committee and her nomination was favorably reported out of committee the same day. The Utah State Senate confirmed Hagen's appointment on May 18, 2022 and she was sworn in the same day. In December 2025, Hagen was accused of infidelity with an attorney practicing in front of the court in redistricting cases; however, the Judicial Conduct Commission later dismissed the complaint, finding claims "speculative, overstated, and misleading." However, after an unusual campaign against her retention by state Republicans and their calls for another investigation, Hagen resigned on May 8, 2026, citing that her family and friends had had "intensely personal details [...] subjected to public scrutiny.

== Awards and memberships ==
Hagen has received the Federal Bar Association Distinguished Service Award, four United States Attorney's Awards, a Federal Bureau of Investigation Award, and many other honors. She was also a member of the Utah Dating Violence Task Force, a Girl Scout troop leader for six years, and vice chair of the Mountain View Elementary Community Council.

Legal offices
Preceded by Constandinos Himonas	Justice of the Utah Supreme Court; 2022–2026	Succeeded by Michael Menssen
