= Denise M. Mercherson =

American lawyer

Denise M. Mercherson is Utah’s first African American female lawyer.

Mercherson was raised in the Hyde Park community on the South Side, Chicago. She received her psychology degree from Macalester College in Saint Paul, Minnesota and earned her Juris Doctor from the University of Utah College of Law in Salt Lake City, Utah. On September 26, 1979, she became the first African American female admitted to practice law in Utah. By 1986, Mercherson returned to Chicago to set up her own law practice. During the 1990s, she began working as a volunteer tutor at South Loop Elementary School.

== See also ==
- List of first women lawyers and judges in Utah
