= Delana R. Eckels =

American judge (1806–1888)

Delana R. Eckels (August 19, 1806 – October 29, 1888) was an American lawyer, politician, and judge who served in the Indiana House of Representatives in 1836, and as chief justice of the Supreme Court of the Utah Territory from 1857 to 1860.

== Biography ==
Born in Fleming County, Kentucky, Eckels read law to gain admission to the bar in 1827, thereafter moving to Monroe County, Indiana. In 1833, he moved to Owen County, Indiana, where he was elected to the Indiana House of Representatives in 1836, and later served in the Mexican–American War. He was a judge of the 7th Indiana Circuit from 1851 to 1852.

In 1857, Eckels was appointed to the Utah Territorial Supreme Court by President James Buchanan, and came west accompanying an expeditionary force that precipitated the Utah War. At the time, the Utah Territory was "in an open state of lawlessness and rebellion", and efforts by Eckels to maintain order were hampered by the ongoing political dissension in the Eastern part of the United States that would shortly lead to the American Civil War. Eckels resigned from the position in 1860 and returned to Indiana, where he practiced law and politically supported the cause of the South in the Civil War.

He later again served as a judge, and as a member of the law faculty at the Indiana University School of Law from 1872 to 1873.

== Personal life and death ==
Eckels died in Greencastle, Indiana, after a lingering illness, at the age of 83. His wife died about a year or two before him, when her clothing caught fire from a stove.

Political offices
Preceded by John F. Kinney	Chief Justice of the Utah Territorial Supreme Court; 1857–1860	Succeeded by John F. Kinney
