= William W. Drummond =

American judge (died 1888)

William Wormer Drummond (died November 20, 1888) was a justice of the Supreme Court of the Utah Territory from 1855 to 1857.

Born in Virginia, Drummond was raised and educated to enter legal practice, moving to Chicago in 1851 for that purpose. He practiced briefly in that city, and became involved in Democratic Party politics, until he was appointed by President Franklin Pierce to serve as a justice of the Utah Territory. Around that time, however, Drummond reportedly became enamored of a woman named Pleasant Ridgeway, described as "a young and beautiful adventuress", for whom Drummond abandoned his wife and children. Drummond brought Ridgeway to Utah with him, claiming that she was his wife, arriving with her in September 1855. Drummond immediately came into conflict with Brigham Young and the Church of Jesus Christ of Latter-day Saints (LDS Church), which controlled the territorial legislature, and at one point Drummond was placed under house arrest by a probate judge appointed by the legislature.

Within a few years, Drummond left, with some accounts attributing this to his determination that the Mormon population "refused to submit to civil authority", and others claiming he was "forced to resign from the bench by the stories of his conduct". Following his resignation, he traveled to New Orleans, where he published an account asserting that the government of Utah had become corrupted by the influence of Brigham Young and the LDS Church, and that the men of Utah swore loyalty to the church over the Constitution. These claims helped to precipitate the Utah War, in which President James Buchanan sent U.S. forces to the territory to quell perceived efforts to form a tyrannical rule over it. Drummond himself returned to Chicago around 1860 to resume the practice of law, but failed in that endeavor, at which point Ridgeway left him.

Drummond reportedly become impoverished, a beggar and a habitual drunkard, and shared a house with petty criminals whom he at least permitted to plan their crimes at the house. He died in a saloon in Chicago in November 1888.

Political offices
Preceded by Leonidas Shaver	Justice of the Utah Territorial Supreme Court; 1855–1857	Succeeded by John Cradlebaugh
