= Eunice Chen =

American lawyer

Eunice S. Chen (later Eunice Chen Buckland) is Utah’s first Asian American female lawyer. Chen was born in Hong Kong in 1946. She earned her Juris Doctor from the University of Utah Law School. On October 19, 1973, she was admitted as the first Asian American female to practice law in the state.

== See also ==
- List of first women lawyers and judges in Utah
