= Judge Hansen =

Judge Hansen may refer to:

- Curtis LeRoy Hansen (1933–2023), judge of the United States District Court for the District of New Mexico
- David R. Hansen (born 1938), judge of the United States Court of Appeals for the Eighth Circuit

== See also ==
- William Cook Hanson (1909–1995), judge of the United States District Courts for the Northern and Southern Districts of Iowa
- Justice Hansen (disambiguation)
