= Frances M. Palacios =

American lawyer

Frances M. Palacios is Utah’s first Hispanic American female judge.

She earned her political science degree from Weber State University (1977) and Juris Doctor from the University of Utah Law School (1980). On October 9, 1980, Palacios was admitted to practice law in the state. During the 1980s, she was employed at the Salt Lake Legal Defenders Association as a court-appointed trial attorney. In 1992, she became the first Hispanic female judge upon being appointed as a Commissioner of the Third District Court.

== See also ==
- List of first women lawyers and judges in Utah
- List of Hispanic and Latino American jurists
