= Leonidas Shaver =

American judge (died 1855)

Leonidas Shaver (died June 29, 1855) was a justice of the Supreme Court of the Utah Territory from 1852 to 1855.

Shaver was appointed by President Millard Fillmore in September 1852 to replace Perry E. Brocchus, whom the president had removed from office.

Shaver died in office in 1855, and his successor, William Wormer Drummond, asserted that Shaver had been murdered, writing in his own 1857 letter of resignation that Shaver "came to his death by drinking poisonous liquors given to him under the orders of the leading men of the Mormon church".

Political offices
Preceded by Perry E. Brocchus	Justice of the Utah Territorial Supreme Court; 1852–1855	Succeeded by William W. Drummond
