= Constandinos Himonas =

American judge

Justice of the Utah Supreme Court
- In office March 18, 2015 – March 1, 2022
- Appointed by: Gary Herbert
- Preceded by: Ronald E. Nehring
- Succeeded by: Diana Hagen

Personal details
- Born: 1964 (age 61–62)
- Education: University of Utah (BA); University of Chicago (JD)

Constandinos Himonas (born 1964) is an American lawyer and former judge who served as a justice of the Utah Supreme Court from 2015 to 2022.

== Early life and education ==
Himonas is originally from Price, Utah and has Greek heritage. He graduated from the University of Utah in 1986 and received his J.D. degree from the University of Chicago Law School in 1989.

== Legal career ==
Prior to taking the bench, Himonas worked for 15 years at the law firm of Jones, Waldo, Holbrook & McDonough. Prior to being confirmed to the Utah Supreme Court, Himonas served as a trial judge in the 3rd District Court.

== Utah Supreme Court ==
After being nominated by Governor Gary Herbert, he was unanimously confirmed by the Utah Senate to the position. He resigned on March 1, 2022.

== Notable rulings and selected opinions ==
=== In re Gray and Rice ===
This opinion, authored by Justice Himonas, deals with the right of transgender individuals to change their legal sex designation on their birth certificates. This case was an appeal by two transgender individuals—Sean Childers-Gray, a transgender man, and Angie Rice, a transgender woman—who had petitioned the Utah District Court for the right to change both their name and sex designation on their birth certificate. The District Court granted the name change but refused the sex change. Justice Himonas, and a majority of the Utah Supreme Court ultimately found that "A person has a common-law right to change facets of their personal legal status, including their sex designation." This decision rested upon the common-law right to change one's own name as well as a Utah statute that tied sex designation changes to name changes.
