= Perry E. Brocchus =

American judge (1810–1880)

Perry E. Brocchus (1810 – August 3, 1880) was a justice of the supreme court of the Utah Territory from 1850 to 1851, and on the supreme court of the New Mexico Territory in 1857 to 1859, and again from 1866 to 1869.

== Biography ==
Born near Alexandria, Virginia, in early life he was a teacher. Moving to Alabama, he became a leading Democratic editor, and was appointed by President Millard Fillmore to be a justice of the Utah Territorial Supreme Court, where "he opposed polygamy and on one occasion was the object of the fury of a Mormon mob". As one source described the events, Brocchus "was incautious in his attacks upon polygamy, and, having been led to believe that his life was in danger, left the Territory", as one of the Runaway Officials of 1851. On the advice of Daniel Webster, Brocchus resigned, and was later appointed a judge for New Mexico, remaining in that state for fourteen years. On the New Mexico federal district court, Brocchus was "the only judge to hold office at two separate times", serving from 1857 to 1859 and again 1866 to 1869.

He was a personal friend of Webster, Henry Clay, and John C. Calhoun.

== Personal life and death ==
He married a sister of George W. Tinges, of Baltimore, but had no children that survived him.

Brocchus died of dropsy (edema), after a lingering illness, at the age of 70, at the residence of his son-in-law, Mr. L. J. Watkins, of Ellicott City, Maryland. He was buried in Loudon Park Cemetery.

Political offices
Preceded by Newly established court	Justice of the Utah Territorial Supreme Court; 1850–1851	Succeeded by Leonidas Shaver
Preceded by John Sebrie Watts; Sydney A. Hubbell	Justice of the New Mexico Territorial Supreme Court; 1857–1859; 1866–1869	Succeeded by W. F. Boon; Hezekiah Johnson
