= Harvey W. Smith =

American judge (1857–1895)

Harvey W. Smith (nicknamed Kentucky Smith; August 18, 1857 – November 22, 1895) was a justice of the Supreme Court of the Utah Territory from 1893 to 1895.

Born in Hickman County, Kentucky, Smith was educated at the Milburn Academy in that state. He taught school for three years during which time he studied law, gaining admission to practice law in Kentucky before attaining the age of majority. He began his professional career as partner of C. W. Bugg of Ballard County, Kentucky. After losing his home and property in a fire, he moved to Malad City, Idaho, in 1883 and to Ogden, Utah in 1887. Because of his Kentucky origin, Smith became known by the nickname, "Kentucky" Smith.

Smith served two terms in the territorial legislature, chairing the judiciary committee in both sessions. Early in 1889 the Liberals prepared to carry the town of Ogden, with Smith as their campaign manager. In that campaign, the Liberals "won by a majority of over four hundred".

On May 8, 1893, President Grover Cleveland removed John W. Blackburn as an associate justice of the territorial supreme court of Utah, and appointed Smith in his place. Smith was among the last appointed associate justices before Utah became a state.

Political offices
Preceded by John W. Blackburn	Justice of the Utah Territorial Supreme Court; 1893–1895	Succeeded by Henry H. Rolapp
