= George P. Stiles =

American judge (1814–1885)

George P. Stiles (1814 – September 1, 1885) was a justice of the Supreme Court of the Utah Territory from 1854 to 1857.

In the 1840s, Stiles had been a prominent Mormon, and had been among the advisers who encouraged Joseph Smith to destroy the press of the anti-polygamy newspaper, the Espositor, in 1844. This act led to Smith's arrest, and his murder while in custody. Stiles later became an apostate from that group, and was excommunicated by them, setting up a significant conflict when Stiles was later appointed by President Franklin Pierce to the territorial supreme court in Utah.

Stiles began his travel to Carson Valley in the Spring of 1854, in the company of Orson Hyde and United States Marshal Heywood, the three arriving there in June. Upon arriving in Utah, Stiles succeeded Associate Justice Zerubbabel Snow, whose term of office expired in 1854. Stiles, Hyde, and Heywood "were empowered by the Utah Legislature to meet with a similar commission from California, and establish in the Carson Valley region the boundary line between that State and this Territory". Once this was done, the three organized Carson County.

Stiles clashed with the Mormon population, seeking to dismantle legal structures that they had erected to avoid scrutiny from the federal government. On December 29, 1856, amidst a conflict with Mormon lawyers, Stiles "had his office raided and certain of his personal papers burned". In 1857, Stiles returned to Washington, D.C., and informed the government their that the Mormon population of Utah was effectively in a state of rebellion.

A genealogist of the Stiles family suggests that he "was probably the Geo. P. Stiles who bore a good record as First Lieutenant of the Thirty-first Ohio Volunteer Regiment, from August, 1861, to Dec. 15, 1864", during the American Civil War. After the war, Stiles "held an office in one of the Governmental Departments, at Washington, D. C.", before eventually moving to Belton, Texas, where he died.

== Personal life ==
Stiles married J. K. Hollister of New York, with whom he had four children.

Political offices
Preceded by Zerubbabel Snow	Justice of the Utah Supreme Court; 1854–1857	Succeeded by Charles E. Sinclair
