= Gordon R. Hall =

American judge (1926–2025)

Chief Justice of the Utah Supreme Court
- In office 1981–1993
- Appointed by: Scott M. Matheson
- Preceded by: Richard J. Maughan
- Succeeded by: Michael David Zimmerman

Personal details
- Born: December 14, 1926 Vernal, Utah, U.S.
- Died: June 1, 2025 (aged 98)

Gordon Roscoe Hall (December 14, 1926 – June 1, 2025) was an American judge who was a justice of the Utah Supreme Court from 1977 to 1993. He served as chief justice from 1981 to 1993, which is longer than any chief justice in Utah history.

== Early legal career ==
Hall was born in Vernal, Utah on December 14, 1926. He practiced law in Tooele, Utah. He was attorney-adviser for the commanding officer at the Tooele Army Depot from 1953 to 1958. At different points in his career, he was town attorney for Wendover and Stockton, and Grantsville city attorney. He was elected three times as Tooele County Attorney.

== Judicial career ==
Hall was appointed to the Third District Court in 1969. Governor Scott M. Matheson appointed him to the Utah Supreme Court in 1977. He became chief justice following the death of his predecessor in that office, Richard J. Maughan. During Hall's tenure as Chief Justice, the Utah Constitution was changed to make the judiciary independent. Utah's Judiciary gave him the Distinguished Jurist Award in 1988. He served as President of the Conference of Chief Justices, chairman of the Utah Judicial Council, and chairman of the board of the National Center for State Courts.

== Later life and death ==
In 2007, the new Tooele County Courthouse was named in his honor. When it opened, it was the only Utah courthouse named for a judge. On June 1, 2025, Hall died at the age of 98.
