= Christine M. Durham =

American judge (born 1945)

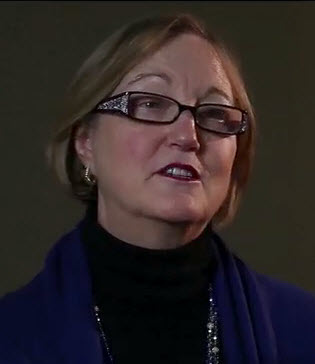
- Portrait of Justice Durham

Chief Justice of the Utah Supreme Court
- In office 2002–2012
- Preceded by: Richard C. Howe
- Succeeded by: Matthew B. Durrant

Associate Justice of the Utah Supreme Court
- In office 1982–2002
- In office 2012–2017
- Appointed by: Scott M. Matheson
- Preceded by: Richard Maughan
- Succeeded by: Paige Petersen

Personal details
- Born: August 3, 1945 (age 81) United States
- Education: Wellesley College; Duke University School of Law

Christine Meaders Durham (born August 3, 1945) is an American lawyer who served as a justice of the Utah Supreme Court from 1982 to 2017, including service as chief justice from 2002 to 2012.

== Early life and education ==
Durham is the oldest child of three, and she grew up in Southern California. When she was young, she aspired to be a novelist. Durham's father initially worked for the IRS in Washington, D.C., and in 1960 he became a US Department of the Treasury attaché at the Paris embassy and the family went to French schools and learned French.

In the early 1960s, Durham moved to New England to attend Wellesley College, a women's college, where she met her husband, George Durham. It was also at this time that she received her patriarchal blessing from the Boston Stake patriarch (she was and is a member of the Church of Jesus Christ of Latter-day Saints), that said things that had a role in her decision to study law. She graduated in 1967 with an A.B. with Honors. She then went to Boston College for law to be near her husband while he finished his undergraduate studies at Harvard. When he was accepted to Duke Medical School, Durham transferred to Duke Law School. She graduated from Duke Law School in 1971.

She is now on the Board of Trustees of Duke University, where she is on the Executive Committee and chairs the Faculty, Graduate and Professional Schools Affairs and Honorary Degree Committees. For a personal account of her early life, see Mormon Women: Portraits and Conversations by James N. Kimball and Kent Miles.

== Legal career ==
Durham was an instructor of legal medicine at Duke University School of Medicine immediately after she graduated from law school in 1971 until 1973. She was admitted to the North Carolina State Bar in 1971. She had a general law practice while in North Carolina, representing private clients in domestic law, employment law, and personal injury law work. She also did title law work and criminal defense work off of the county indigency list. While in North Carolina, she was a legal consultant for the Duke University Center for the Study of Aging and Human Development. She and her husband moved to Utah in 1973, where she became an adjunct professor of law at Brigham Young University's J. Reuben Clark Law School until 1978. At this time she formed a partnership with two other lawyers and founded the law firm of Johnson, Durham, & Moxley. In 1980, the firm merged with a larger firm in Salt Lake City. She also occasionally teaches constitutional law at the University of Utah's S. J. Quinney College of Law.

Durham is on the Council of the American Law Institute and the American Bar Association's Council of Legal Education and Admissions to the Bar. She is a fellow of the American Bar Foundation, and serves on the Board of Directors of both the American Judicature Society and the National Center for State Courts.

== Judicial career ==
In 1978, Durham became a trial judge in the 3rd Judicial District Court for the state of Utah. She served for four years, one of them as the presiding judge. She was appointed as a justice of the Utah Supreme Court by Governor Scott M. Matheson in 1982 and became the Chief Justice in April 2002. She resigned as chief justice in March 2012. She was the first female Chief Justice of a state to swear into office a female governor, when Olene Walker became Utah's 15th governor.

Durham was retained by Utah voters in retention elections in 1984, 1994, 2004, and 2014.

In May 2017, Durham announced that she would retire from the Utah Supreme Court in November 2017. She was succeeded on the bench by Paige Petersen.

=== Polygamy ===
In the case of In the Matter of the Adoption of W. A. T., et al., 808 P.2d 1083, 1085 State v. Holm (Utah 1991), Justice Durham protected the civil rights of polygamists. The decision held that the Utah Constitution does not per se preclude a polygamist family from adopting children. Justice Durham, writing for the 3-2 court, noted, "The fact that our constitution requires the state to prohibit polygamy does not necessarily mean that the state must deny any or all civil rights and privileges to polygamists." She noted that many things are crimes like polygamy, but we extend civil rights to perpetrators of those crimes. She stated, "It is not the role of the courts to make threshold exclusions dismissing without consideration, for example, the adoption petitions of all convicted felons, all persons engaging in fornication or adultery, or other persons engaged in illegal activities." The decision also upheld the constitutionality of the bigamy statute in the Utah Constitution.

=== Fetal rights ===
In the case of State v. MacGuire, 84 P.3d 1171 (Utah 2004) in 2004 the Utah Supreme Court ruled that all fetuses are covered under the state's criminal homicide statute. Though she agreed with that premise, Justice Durham dissented based on the definition of the capital murder and aggravated murder charges as well as based on the US Supreme Court decision of Roe v. Wade. "Declaring a fetus to be a 'person' entitled to equal protection would require not only overturning Roe v. Wade but also making abortion, as a matter of constitutional law, illegal in all circumstances, even to save the life of the mother."

=== Primacy ===
Durham is a proponent of first looking to the Utah Constitution before the Federal Constitution for protection of an individual's rights. In her concurrence to State v. Daniels, 40 P.3d 611, 626 (Utah 2002), she stated, "I continue to be a proponent of independent state constitutional analysis on federalism grounds, believing we should use a primacy approach or dual analysis approach whenever possible." In State v. Larocco, 794 P.2d 460 (Utah 1990), however, Justice Durham recognized the duality of the American system. Justice Durham, in her majority opinion, explained that states may rest their analysis on state constitution first because it "may prove to be an appropriate method for insulating citizens from the vagaries of inconsistent interpretations given . . . by the federal courts."

=== Gun rights ===
In the case of University of Utah v. Shurtleff, 144 P.3d 1109 (Utah 2006)., the Utah Supreme Court ruled in a 4-1 decision that the University of Utah has no right to ban guns on campus, rejecting the argument that prohibiting firearms is part of the school's power to control academic affairs. In her dissent, Chief Justice Durham said policies that are reasonably connected to the school's academic mission are within its autonomous authority over academic affairs. Under the majority analysis, she said, "the university may not subject a student to academic discipline for flashing his pistol to a professor in class."

== Publications and speeches ==
Justice Durham has published numerous articles and is a frequent lecturer on the judiciary, women's issues, and civic education. She helped draft a manual on legal rights of the elderly. Also, as a former head of the Judiciary Branch of Utah, she gave annual State of the Judiciary addresses to the legislative branch of the state. She has spoken at various conventions, including the 2010 Spring Convention of the Utah State Bar, the 2010 National Conference of the American Bar Association, and the 123rd Jackson Lecture in 2009.

== Community service ==
Durham served on the Governor's Task Force that recommended legislation to implement the 1985 amendments to the Judicial Article of the Utah Constitution. She served on the Utah Constitutional Revision Commission for 12 years. As Chief Justice, she chaired the Utah Judicial Council, which is the administrative governing body of the state court system. She served as the first chair of the Utah Judicial Council's Education Committee. She was the Founder of the Leadership Institute in Judicial Education. She was part of the Commission on Justice in the 21st century and the co-chair of the Committee on Improving Jury Service. She was the first chair of the Utah State Court's Public Outreach Committee. From 1986 to 1997 she was the president of the National Association of Women Judges, which organization she founded. She was on the Advisory Committee on the Federal Rules of Civil Procedure. She is an immediate past president of the Conference of Chief Justices, and is the first Utahn to be elected to this position.

== Awards and advisory positions ==
In 2007, Durham received the William H. Rehnquist Award for Judicial Excellence She has received honorary a degree from Utah Valley University.

University of the People (Member of Board of Trustees)

== Personal life ==
Durham is a member of the Church of Jesus Christ of Latter-day Saints.

== See also ==
Kimball, James N. and Miles, Kent. Mormon Women: Portraits and Conversations. 1st ed. Salt Lake City, UT: Handcart Books, 2009. 184-209. Print. Utah Bar News Albany Law Review

- List of female state supreme court justices
- List of first women lawyers and judges in Utah
