= Phillip H. Emerson =

American judge (c. 1834–1889)

Philip H. Emerson (February 15, 1833 – March 9, 1889) was a justice of the Supreme Court of the Utah Territory from 1873 to 1885.

Philip Henry Emerson was born in Danby, Rutland, Vermont, on February 15, 1833. He attended the common schools until he was advanced enough to become a schoolteacher. He read law to gain admission to the bar, and entered private practice in Washington, Vermont. Just before the American Civil War, he moved to Battle Creek, Michigan, where he continued to practice. He was elected to the Michigan House of Representatives, and then the Michigan Senate, of which he was president pro tempore for a term. In the state senate, he represented at first the 11th district from 1871 to 1872, and then the 8th district in 1873.

In 1873, President Ulysses S. Grant appointed Emerson to the Territorial Supreme Court of Utah, after an endorsement from Michigan Senator Thomas W. Ferry. Emerson resigned from the Michigan Senate to take the position. He was reappointed by President Rutherford B. Hayes in 1877, and by President Andrew Garfield in 1881, continuing until his retirement on April 1, 1885. Emerson then returned to private practice in Ogden, Utah. In 1883, he was appointed to a committee established to revise the laws of the territory.

Emerson died in his home following a period of heart problems.

Political offices
Preceded by Obed F. Strickland	Justice of the Utah Supreme Court; 1873–1885	Succeeded by Orlando W. Powers
