= Charles E. Sinclair =

American judge (c. 1828 – 1887)

Charles E. Sinclair (c. 1828 – March 11, 1887) was a justice of the Supreme Court of the Utah Territory from 1857 to 1860.

Born in Virginia, Sinclair was appointed to the Utah territorial supreme court in 1857, by President James Buchanan. Sinclair's time as a judge in the territory was tumultuous, as the following account explains:

Sinclair opened court at Salt Lake City in November, 1858. His first move was not a reassuring one to the people, who, trusting in the pledge given by Governor Cumming and the Peace Commissioners, that the Federal representatives would keep faith with the citizens and hold sacred the amnesty extended by President Buchanan, had abandoned their exodus and returned to their homes and various avocations. It seemed to them an attempt to ignore or override the President's decree; to render null and void his offer of pardon which the people had accepted. In short, Judge Sinclair, in charging the grand jury of his court, urged them to indict ex-Governor Young, Lieutenant-General Wells and other prominent Mormons for treason; also for intimidation of court and for polygamy. The Judge held that President Buchanan's pardon, while it was "a public fact in the history of the country," "ought to be brought judicially by plea, motion or otherwise." This meant that the decree of the Chief Magistrate of the nation was not to have full force and effect until he, Charles E. Sinclair, appointed by said Chief Magistrate an Associate Justice of Utah, had sat upon it and pronounced it valid; or, as Mr. Stenhouse puts it, "he wanted to bring before his court Brigham Young and the leading Mormons to make them admit that they had been guilty of treason, and make them humbly accept from him the President's clemency."

Sinclair's resignation from the position was reported in April 1860. After leaving the court, he returned to his native Virginia to oppose secession. He also briefly edited a newspaper in Memphis, Tennessee. Returning to Virginia, he "was engaged by the confederacy in the secret service department in Richmond". After the war he resumed private practice in Richmond, and served in the Senate of Virginia, "where he was known as a fine linguist", and "made an enviable reputation both as a lawyer and an orator".

Early one morning, Sinclair was found dead on the floor at his home in Manassas, at the age of 59. Having appeared in good health the night before, his death was supposed to have resulted from apoplexy.

Political offices
Preceded by George P. Stiles	Justice of the Utah Territorial Supreme Court; 1857–1860	Succeeded by Robert Patterson Flenniken
