= Ephraim Hanson =

American judge (1872–1952)

Ephraim Hanson (March 10, 1872 – February 5, 1952) was a justice of the Utah Supreme Court from 1929 to 1938.

== Biography ==
Hanson received his undergraduate degree from the University of Utah and his law degree from the University of Michigan Law School in 1893, gaining admission to the Utah Bar the same year. He practiced law in Sanpete County, Utah, where he served as county attorney. In 1912, he moved to Salt Lake City, practicing law there until he was elected to a seat on the Utah Third Judicial District in 1920. He served on that court for two four year terms.

In 1929, Hanson was appointed to a seat on the state supreme court vacated by the death of Joseph E. Frick. Hanson did not run for re-election in 1940.

== Personal life and death ==
After graduating from law school in 1893, Hanson married Ella Dorius of Ephraim.

Hanson died of a heart attack at his home in Los Angeles, California, at the age of 79.

Political offices
| Preceded by Joseph E. Frick | Justice of the Utah Supreme Court; 1929–1938 | Succeeded by Eugene E. Pratt |
