= Joseph E. Frick =

American judge (–)

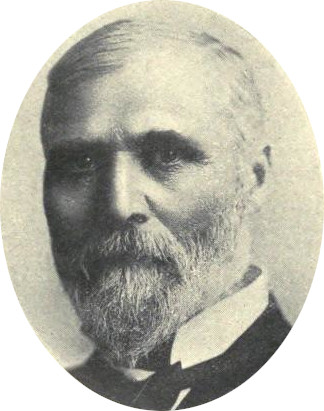
- Born: August 6, 1848; Tiffin Township, Ohio
- Died: February 12, 1927 (aged 78); Los Angeles, California
- Known for: Justice of the Utah Supreme Court

Joseph E. Frick (August 6, 1848 – February 12, 1927) was a justice of the Utah Supreme Court from 1906 to 1919, and then from 1919 until his death in 1927, and was chief justice from 1910 to 1912, and from 1917 to 1919. appointed by Governor Bamberger

Frick was appointed to a seat vacated by the resignation of George W. Bartch, and was reelected om 1912. He was defeated in a second bid for re-election in 1918 by Albert J. Weber, but in 1919 was appointed to a different seat vacated by the death of William M. McCarty.

Frick died at the home of his son, Fred O. Frick, in Los Angeles, California, where he had gone to recuperate from an illness, at the age of 78.

Political offices
Preceded by George W. Bartch; William M. McCarty	Justice of the Utah Supreme Court; 1906–1918; 1919–1927	Succeeded by Albert J. Weber; Elias Hansen
