= Elias Hansen (judge) =

American judge (1877–1966)

Elias Hansen (January 31, 1877 – September 3, 1966) was a justice of the Utah Supreme Court from 1927 to 1937, serving as chief justice from 1935 to 1937.

== Early life, education, and career ==
Born in Benjamin, Utah, James and Mary (Sorensen) Hansen, his parents were natives of Denmark who had settled in Utah, where his father became a farmer and cattle rancher, and an active member of the Church of Jesus Christ of Latter-day Saints. Hansen, one of eight children born to the couple, attended the schools of Benjamin, Lake Shore, and Spanish Fork. His family being unable to support his ambitions, he worked as a sheep shearer and as a miner in order to attend the University of Utah. He then taught school for six years in the high school of Park City, in Summit County, Utah, enabling him to continue he studies and receive his B.A. in 1902. He then taught history in the University of Utah for one year, and taught at the Branch Normal School at Cedar City, Utah, for four years. He spent two years in the University of Chicago studying law to gain admission to the bar in 1908. While there, he met and became friends with David W. Moffat, who also went on to serve on the Utah Supreme Court.

Hansen established a law office at Spanish Fork, and by 1920 was "a prominent member of the Utah bar, practicing at Spanish Fork" and was considered to be "in the front rank of the representatives of the legal profession in Utah". He also became keenly interested in orcharding, and before 1920 was the owner of a sixty-acre fruit farm. He was described as doing "much experimental work upon his place". On one occasion he was defeated for the office of district attorney. However, he served eight years as city attorney of Spanish Fork.

== Judicial service ==
In 1920, Hansen was elected judge of the Utah District Court of the Fourth Judicial District. He took office in 1921 and "gained a reputation of being one of the outstanding trial judges of [the] State". He was re-elected in 1924, serving until 1926, when he was elected to a seat on the Utah Supreme Court. A member of the Republican Party, he served on that court from 1927 to 1937, including service as chief justice from 1935 until his departure from the court on January 4, 1937, having lost his bid for reelection the previous year.

== Personal life ==
Hansen married Elizabeth Moore of Salt Lake City on April 2, 1903; they had one daughter, Ella, born around 1906. He died in 1966, and was buried in Salt Lake City Cemetery.

Political offices
Preceded by Joseph E. Frick	Associate Justice of the Utah Supreme Court; 1927–1935	Succeeded by James H. Wolfe
Preceded by Daniel N. Straup	Chief Justice of the Utah Supreme Court; 1935–1937	Succeeded by Valentine Gideon
