= Henry H. Rolapp =

American judge (1860–1936)

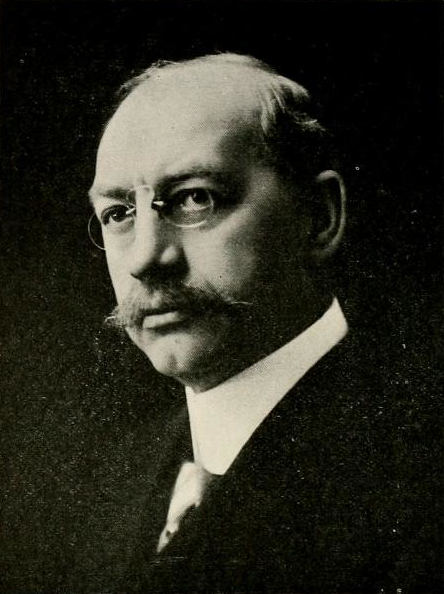
- Born: March 22, 1860
- Died: January 8, 1936 (aged 75); Los Angeles, California
- Known for: Justice of the Utah Territory Supreme Court

Henry H. Rolapp (March 22, 1860 – January 8, 1936) was a justice of the Supreme Court of the Utah Territory from 1895 to 1896.

Born in Germany, Rolapp moved with his family to Utah in 1880, the family having converted to Mormonism. He received his law degree from University of Michigan Law School in 1884, and practiced in Montpelier, Idaho, before relocating to Ogden, Utah. On November 20, 1895, President Grover Cleveland appointed Rolapp to the territorial supreme court, where he remained until Utah was admitted to statehood the following year. He was thereafter elected as a state district court judge, and later served for various times as president of Amalgamated Sugar Company, and in various other corporate capacities.

Political offices
Preceded by Harvey W. Smith	Justice of the Utah Territorial Supreme Court; 1895–1896	Succeeded by Court abolished
