= Leonard Russon =

American judge

Leonard Harrington Russon (May 15, 1933 – July 29, 2023) was a justice of the Utah Supreme Court.

He was a Latter-day Saint and served in the United States Navy during the Korean War. He received both his bachelor and law degrees from the University of Utah. He then practiced law in both California and Utah for over 20 years.

In 1984, Russon was appointed to the third judicial circuit by Governor Scott M. Matheson. He was appointed to the Utah Court of Appeals in 1991 and to the Utah Supreme Court in 1994. He retired in 2003.
