= Solomon P. McCurdy =

American judge (1820–1890)

Solomon P. McCurdy (1820–1890) was a justice of the Supreme Court of the Utah Territory from 1864 to 1868.

A record of the collected papers of Abraham Lincoln noted that "Lincoln's endorsement is written on a letter from Austin A. King and others, January 5, 1864, recommending Judge Solomon P. McCurdy of Missouri" for the Utah territorial supreme court. Lincoln nominated McCurdy to the seat, and the United States Senate confirmed the appointment on April 21, 1864. In 1868, President Andrew Johnson sought to elevate McCurdy to chief justice of the court, but the nomination was rejected by the Senate.

McCurdy thereafter remained in Utah. In June 1874, a newspaper reported an altercation in which a drunken soldier attacked McCurdy, described in the report as "an elderly and very inoffensive gentleman", and threw him into a ditch. Locals interceded to apprehend the soldier and take him to be locked up, and McCurdy was not seriously injured.

McCurdy had a son, William N. McCurdy, who was a star player for the Corinne Base Ball Club in 1869, and one of only a handful of non-Mormon players on the team.

Political offices
Preceded by Charles Burlingame Waite	Justice of the Utah Territorial Supreme Court; 1864–1868	Succeeded by Enos D. Hoge
