= James W. Cherry =

American judge (1872–1949)

James William Cherry (April 5, 1872 – March 23, 1949) was a justice of the Utah Supreme Court from 1923 to 1933, and was chief justice from 1929 to 1933.

== Early life, education, and career ==
Born on a farm in Tioga, Hancock County, Illinois, Cherry studied law in Kansas under the supervision of his father, who was a lawyer and a judge. and then moved to Utah with his parents in 1892. He gained admission to the bar in Utah in 1893, and moved to Sanpete County, Utah, in 1895, where he entered the practice of law. In 1912, he was elected District Attorney of the Seventh Judicial District. During World War I, he chaired the Sanpete County Council of Defense and was "prominent in the war activities", his eldest son being a volunteer serving in France.

== Judicial service and later life ==
Cherry was an unsuccessful candidate for a seat on the Utah Supreme Court in 1918. In 1922, however, he was elected to the court, taking office in 1923 and serving for ten years, until declining health forced him to resign.

In 1936, Cherry moved to Phoenix, Arizona, though on a 1938 visit to Salt Lake City, he indicated that he was pleased that Franklin D. Roosevelt's court-packing plan had been defeated. He moved to Chandler, Arizona in 1940, and then to Mesa, Arizona in 1942.

== Personal life and death ==
In 1898, Cherry married Louise Keller of Manti, Utah, with whom he had three sons and three daughters.

He was a Freemason. He became a member of Damascus Lodge No. 10 of the Free and Accepted Masons of Utah in March, 1906. He served as Master of that Lodge during the year 1909. In 1910, he was appointed as the Junior Grand Steward of the Grand Lodge of Utah. He was elected as Junior Grand Warden in 1911, Senior Grand Warden in 1912, Deputy Grand Master in 1913, and Grand Master on 21 January 1914. He became a member of the Scottish Rite in 1918 and of the Ancient Arabic Order of the Mystic Shrine in 1923.

Cherry died in his home in Mesa at the age of 76, from a heart ailment, following an asthmatic attack.

Political offices
Preceded by Elmer E. Corfman	Justice of the Utah Supreme Court; 1923–1933	Succeeded by David W. Moffat
