= Enos D. Hoge =

American judge (1831–1912)

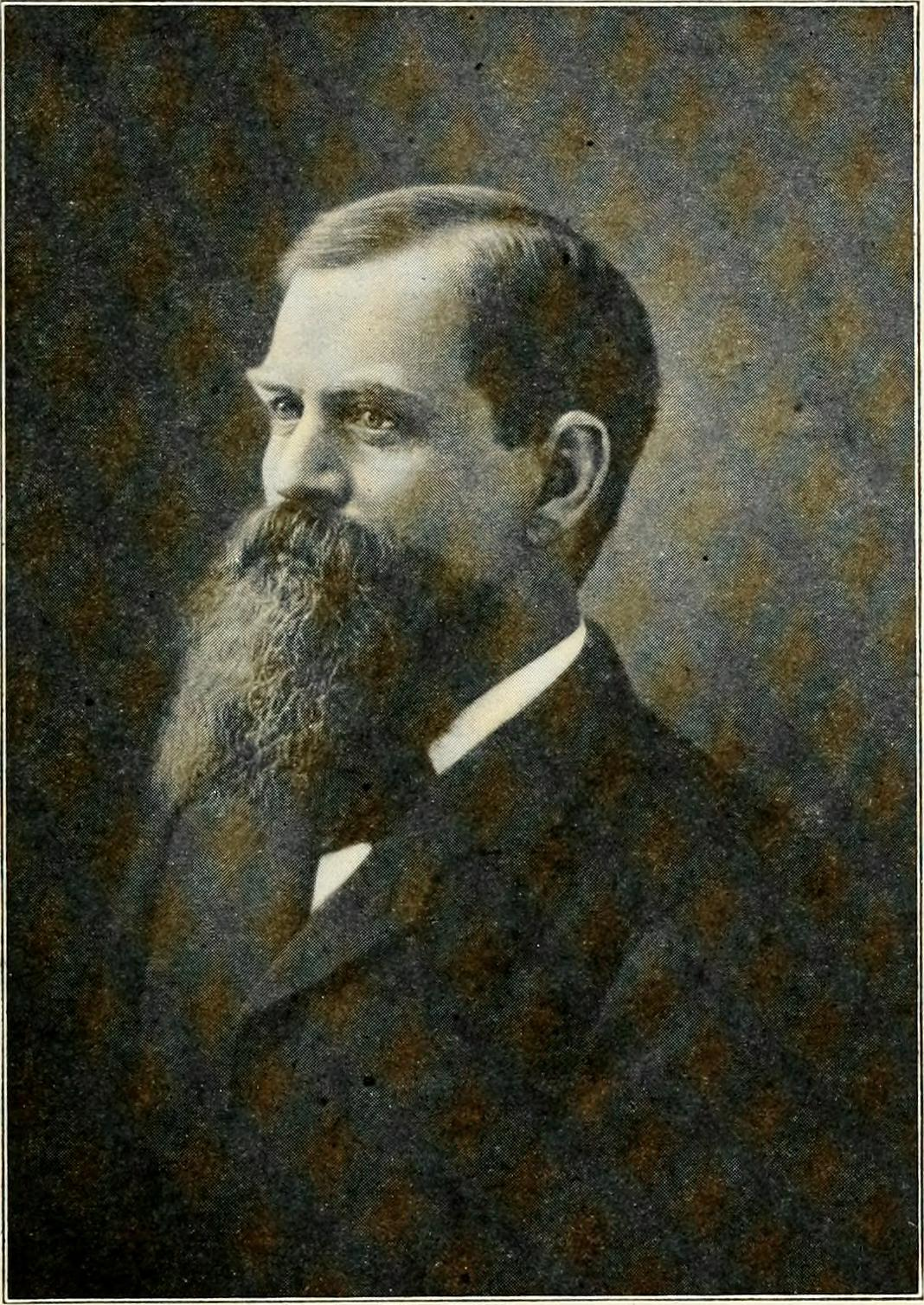
Utah Territorial Supreme Court Justice Enos D. Hoge.

Enos Daugherty Hoge (July 23, 1831 – July 27, 1912) was a justice of the Supreme Court of the Utah Territory from 1868 to 1869.

Born near Morgan, Virginia (later West Virginia), Hoge moved to Illinois at an early age and read law under a federal judge there. During the American Civil War, Hoge served as first lieutenant and captain of Company H, 110th Illinois Infantry Regiment, from September 11, 1862, to May 8, 1863, when he was honorably discharged. During this service, he participated in the Battle of Stones River in December, 1862, where heavy cannon fire left him deaf in his right ear.

Hoge settled in Salt Lake Valley in July 1865 and opened a law office. He served two terms as city attorney of Salt Lake City under mayor Robert N. Baskin. In 1868, President Andrew Johnson appointed Hoge to serve on the Utah Territorial Supreme Court, where Hoge sat for one year. Hoge then returned to private practice in Salt Lake City. In 1875, Hoge was a defense attorney in the first trial of John D. Lee, one of the accused participants in the Mountain Meadows Massacre. Hoge was one of five "liberal" members elected to serve in the Utah Territorial legislature convened in 1888. In that capacity, Hoge introduced a "Marriage Bill" to prohibit polygamy and restrict who could perform marriages.

In February 1890, his military pension was set at $10 per month, due to the board of surgeons finding that he remained totally deaf in the right ear, and slightly deaf in the left ear. By 1904, it was reported that his income from the practice of law "had ceased almost entirely and to the extent that it fails to furnish him the common necessaries of life", that his law library and office furniture had been destroyed in a fire and his only property consisted of $150 to $200 worth of household goods, and that he had no other income. In light of these circumstances, his military pension was increased to $30 per month.

His funeral was held by the Independent Order of Odd Fellows, of which he had been a grand master, and was reported as having been well-attended.

Political offices
Preceded by Solomon P. McCurdy	Justice of the Utah Supreme Court; 1868–1869	Succeeded by Obed F. Strickland
