= Paige Petersen =

American judge (born 1972)

Justice of the Utah Supreme Court
- Incumbent
- Assumed office December 2017
- Appointed by: Gary Herbert
- Preceded by: Christine Durham

Personal details
- Born: February 17, 1972 (age 54) Georgia, U.S.
- Education: College of Eastern Utah (AA); University of Utah (BA); Yale University (JD)

Paige Michaela Petersen (born February 17, 1972) is an American lawyer and judge, who is a justice of the Utah Supreme Court. She previously served as a Utah District Court judge from 2015 to 2017.

== Education and early career ==
Petersen was born in Georgia in 1972, but grew up in Emery County, Utah. She graduated from Carbon High School in Price, Utah. She completed an associate degree at the College of Eastern Utah, and a bachelor's degree at the University of Utah in 1995, where she majored in political science and English. Petersen was an intern at the White House in 1995–1996. She completed her J.D. degree at Yale Law School in 1999.

Petersen clerked for federal judge Susan Dlott of the United States District Court for the Southern District of Ohio in 1999–2001, and was an associate attorney for the law firm Simpson Thacher & Bartlett in New York City from 2001 to 2003. She worked as an Assistant U.S. Attorney for the Eastern District of New York from 2003 to 2008. Petersen then spent two years in the Netherlands working as a prosecutor at the International Criminal Tribunal for the former Yugoslavia.

In 2012, Petersen moved back to Utah, and worked for the office of the United States Attorney for the District of Utah.

== Judicial career ==
The Governor of Utah Gary Herbert appointed Petersen as a state judge in March 2015, serving on the Utah District Court for the Third Judicial District, which covers three counties: Salt Lake, Summit, and Tooele.

In May 2017, Utah Supreme Court justice Christine Durham announced that she would retire in November 2017. Utah's Judicial nominating commission announced seven possible candidates for the Supreme Court vacancy in September 2017, including Petersen, three other state judges, and three other lawyers. Governor Herbert announced Petersen as his choice to replace Durham on October 31, 2017. She was confirmed by the Utah State Senate on November 15, 2017.

Petersen began her service as a justice of the Utah Supreme Court in December 2017. Prior to her first term ending on January 1, 2023, she stood in a retention election on November 8, 2022 and was retained with 82.7% of the vote. She will face a second retention election in November 2032.

Legal offices
Preceded by Christine Durham	Justice of the Utah Supreme Court; 2017–present	Incumbent
