= Jay Jorgensen =

American judge

Justice of the Utah Supreme Court
- Incumbent
- Assumed office June 22, 2026
- Appointed by: Spencer Cox
- Preceded by: Seat established

Personal details
- Born: Jay Thomas Jorgensen Utah, U.S.
- Party: Republican
- Education: Brigham Young University (BA, JD)

Jay Thomas Jorgensen is an American judge. He has served as a justice of the Utah Supreme Court since 2026.

== Life and career ==
Jorgensen was born in Utah. He attended J. Reuben Clark Law School, earning his Juris Doctor degree. After earning his degree, he lived in Arkansas, Washington, D.C. and South Korea, and worked as an attorney. He was a clerk for Chief Justice of the United States William Rehnquist, and ran in the Republican primary for the Utah's 2nd congressional district in the 2002 elections, placing third. He later returned to Utah in 2020. He worked as a senior counsel for The Church of Jesus Christ of Latter-day Saints.

Jorgensen has served as a justice of the Utah Supreme Court since 2026. He was appointed by Governor Spencer Cox, and was confirmed in a 22–7 vote by the Utah State Senate in June 2026.

Legal offices
| New seat | Justice of the Utah Supreme Court; 2026–present | Incumbent |
