= Ronald E. Nehring =

American judge (1947–2019)

Justice of the Utah Supreme Court
- In office 2003–2015
- Appointed by: Michael O. Leavitt
- Succeeded by: Constandinos Himonas

Personal details
- Born: October 4, 1947 Fond du Lac, Wisconsin, U.S.
- Died: May 24, 2019 (aged 71)
- Education: Cornell University; S.J. Quinney College of Law

Ronald E. Nehring (October 4, 1947 – May 24, 2019) was an American judge and attorney who was a justice of the Utah Supreme Court from 2003 until his retirement in 2015.

== Early life and education ==
Nehring was born on October 4, 1947, in Fond du Lac, Wisconsin, to parents Elden and Lillian, and raised in Kalamazoo, Michigan.

A talented athlete, Nehring competed in track and field at Cornell University where he received All-American honors. In 1972, Nehring just missed qualifying for the United States Olympic team in the 4x800 meter relay.

Nehring graduated from Cornell University with a B.A. in History and was a member of the Quill and Dagger society. He received a law degree from the University of Utah's S.J. Quinney College of Law. While attending law school, he wrote for the Journal of Contemporary Law.

== Personal life ==
In 1974, Nehring married Kristina Hindert. While Nehring attended law school, Kristina attended medical school at the University of Utah. The Nehrings have three children.

Nehring won a ride and tie national championship—an event where two people and one horse form a team and race over rugged mountain courses of 50 or 100 miles.

Nehring died from complication due to cancer on May 24, 2019.

== Practicing Attorney ==
In 1978 after completing law school, Nehring began his legal career at Utah Legal Services Corporation (ULS), a non-profit organization established to provide free legal help to low-income individuals in non-criminal cases. Nehring became the managing attorney of the organization. While at ULS, Nehring conceived of and organized a Utah State Bar project which provided free legal services from volunteer attorneys for appropriate indigent clients.

After several years at ULS, Nehring joined the Salt Lake City law firm of Prince, Yeates, and Geldzahler where he practiced civil litigation. Nehring eventually became a shareholder in the firm. He practiced with the firm for fourteen years.

While at Prince, Yeates, and Geldzahler, Nehring tried the influential case of First Security Bank v. Banberry Crossing, 780 P.2d 1253 (Utah 1989). Nehring successfully defended his client against claims of fraud in connection with a failed real estate development. He also argued the case when the plaintiff appealed to the Utah Supreme Court. The case helped to establish the elements of business fraud in the state of Utah.

== District Court Judge ==
In 1995, Governor Michael Leavitt appointed Nehring to the Utah District Court trial bench. Nehring served as the presiding judge of the Third Judicial District Court. He also served as chair of the Board of District Court Judges, as member of the Supreme Court Advisory Committee on the Rules of Professional Conduct, and as a member of the Utah Judicial Council.

Nehring presided over Alvarez v. State of Utah, Civil No. 000909680 (Utah 3rd Dist. 2000), a case challenging the right of elected officials to communicate to the public through the use of non-English languages. In his memorandum opinion, Nehring upheld the rights of government employees to communicate in languages other than English. Nehring also ruled that the state could continue to give drivers license exams in languages other than English.

Nehring's service as a district court judge ended with his appointment to the Utah Supreme Court.

== Utah Supreme Court ==
In May 2003, Nehring was appointed to the Utah Supreme Court by Governor Michael Leavitt. Nehring endured an extended confirmation process in front of the Utah State Senate Judicial Confirmation Committee. Nehring was questioned concerning numerous politically controversial topics in Utah, including abortion rights, capital punishment, and the separation of church and state. The fact that Nehring, if confirmed, would be the only Supreme Court Justice to be unaffiliated with the state's predominant religion (The Church of Jesus Christ of Latter-Day Saints) was discussed by the Senate Confirmation Committee. The committee also considered questions relating to Nehring's health and his battle with cancer. For a description of the confirmation process, see the Additional Reading section.

Associate Chief Justice Nehring announced his retirement in July 2014. He retired from the Utah Supreme Court on February 1, 2015. Justice Nehring was replaced by Constandinos Himonas, a judge in Utah's Third District—also not a member of the state's predominant religion.

== Punitive Damages ==
=== Campbell v. State Farm Mutual Auto. Ins. Co., 98 P.3d 409 (Utah 2004) ===
The facts, as cited in the summary presented in the issued Utah Supreme Court opinion, were as follows:

Mr. Campbell was responsible for an automobile accident that disabled Robert Slusher and killed Todd Ospital. At the time, Mr. Campbell was insured by State Farm up to $25,000. State Farm chose not to settle the case. At trial, Mr. Campbell was found 100 percent responsible and a judgment was entered against him for $135,000. State Farm refused to pay this amount, suggesting instead that the Campbells put their house up for sale to pay off the judgment. Although State Farm did eventually pay the judgment, the Campbells sued for bad faith. At trial, the Campbells were permitted to introduce evidence that State Farm had a comprehensive nationwide policy of handling certain claims in a like manner.

The jury awarded the Campbells $2,086.75 in special damages, $2.6 million in compensatory damages, and $145 million in punitive damages. The trial judge remitted this amount to $1 million in compensatory damages and $25 million in punitive damages.

The case of Campbell v. State Farm Mutual Auto. Ins. Co. is one of the highest profile cases considered by the Utah Supreme Court during the term of Nehring's service as a Utah Supreme Court justice. The United States Supreme Court agreed to hear an appeal of the court's decision and entered a landmark opinion limiting the award of punitive damages. The United States Supreme Court reversed the jury verdict and remanded the case to the Utah Supreme Court to determine the factors to be considered in punitive damage cases to insure that any punitive damages awarded would be awarded in a manner consistent with the United States Supreme Court opinion. The task of writing the new opinion for the Utah Supreme Court fell to Justice Nehring. In providing a background for his opinion Nehring wrote:

We take up this case after remand from the United States Supreme Court, which held that the imposition of a $145 million punitive damages award against State Farm Mutual Automobile Insurance Company in favor of State Farm's insured, Curtis B. Campbell, and his wife, Inez Preece Campbell, was excessive and violated the due process clause of the Fourteenth Amendment to the Constitution of the United States. State Farm Mut. Auto. Ins. Co. v. Campbell, 538 U.S. 408 (2003) (Campbell II) (rev'g 2001 UT 89, 65 P.3d 1134 (Campbell I)). The Supreme Court directed us to recalculate the punitive damages award under principles articulated in its decision. We have performed this task and reduced the jury's award to $9,018,780.75 in punitive damages, a figure nine times the amount of compensatory and special damages awarded to the Campbells.

== Fourth Amendment ==
=== Brigham City v. Stuart, 122 P.3d 506 (Utah 2005) ===
The facts, as cited in the summary presented in the issued Utah Supreme Court opinion, were as follows:

Four Brigham City police officers responded to a complaint of a loud party. They arrived at the offending residence at about three o'clock in the morning. They traveled to the back of the house to investigate the noise. From a location in the driveway, the officers peered through a slat fence and observed two apparently underage males drinking alcohol. The officers then entered the backyard through a gate, thereby obtaining a clear view into the back of the house through a screen door and two windows. The officers saw four adults restraining one juvenile. The juvenile broke free, swung a fist and struck one of the adults in the face. Two officers then opened the screen door and "hollered" to identify themselves. When no one heard them, they entered the kitchen. After entering, one of the officers again shouted to identify and call attention to himself. As those present in the kitchen became aware of the officers, they became angry that the officers had entered the house without permission.

The officers subsequently arrested the adults. They were charged with contributing to the delinquency of a minor, disorderly conduct, and intoxication. The defendants filed a motion to suppress which gave rise to this petition.

The Utah Supreme Court in a 3-2 opinion authored by Justice Nehring held that police officers could not enter a home without a warrant unless appropriate exigent circumstances justified the intrusion. The opinion further held that a suspicion of domestic violence was an insufficient exigency to justify intrusion without a warrant.

The decision of the Utah Supreme Court was overturned by the United States Supreme Court which held that police may "enter a home without a warrant when they have an objectively reasonable basis for believing that an occupant is seriously injured or imminently threatened with such injury." Brigham City v. Stuart, 547 US. 398 (2006)

== Elections ==
=== Adams v. Swensen, 108 P.3d 725 (Utah 2005) ===
The issue before the court was whether a physician's letter concerning the condition of Salt Lake County Mayor Nancy Workman was sufficient to permit the Salt Lake County Republican Party to replace Mayor Workman on the ballot for the November 2, 2004 general election for the office of Salt Lake County Mayor. After receiving the nomination by the Salt Lake County Republican Party to run for reelection, Mayor Workman was charged with two felonies relating to alleged misuse of county funds. The Republican party sought to withdraw her name and substitute a new nominee on the ballot. The district court ruled that the letter was not sufficient and entered an order barring Salt Lake County Clerk Sherrie Swensen from replacing Mayor Workman's name on the ballot.

Justice Nehring authored the opinion of a unanimous 5-0 court that reversed the decision of the District Court thus allowing the substitute candidate's name to be placed on the ballot. In his opinion, Nehring opined that an election should ensure the full opportunity for individuals to become candidates and for voters to express their choice.

== Court Procedures ==
=== Allen v. Friel, 194 P.3d 903 (Utah 2008) ===
The facts, as stated by Justice Nehring in the introductory section of his published opinion, were as follows:

Mr. Allen, pro se, filed a petition for post-conviction relief under the Post-Conviction Relief Act. Utah Code Ann. § 78-35a-101 to -304 (2002). Mr. Allen's petition alleged five broad claims for relief; the district court, however, discovered eleven separate claims in the petition. The claims the district court found were (1) that there was judicial bias; (2) that the prosecution used false testimony during trial; (3) that the jurors were not fair and impartial; (4) that the trial court erred in refusing to give his proffered jury instructions; (5) that the jury instructions and special verdict form were erroneous; (6) that the trial court erred by trying him for multiple offenses; (7) that the Utah Supreme Court's decision on his direct appeal was result-driven and erroneous; (8) that the trial court's errors resulted in a trial that was fundamentally unfair; (9) that the trial court erred in denying his motion for a new trial; (10) that there was ineffective assistance of trial counsel; and (11) that there was ineffective assistance of appellate counsel. Mr. Allen's petition also challenged the trial court's denial of the jurors' request for transcripts of the prosecution witnesses' testimony.

The case was filed by Mr. Allen, pro se, and not with the assistance of a lawyer. Writing for a unanimous court, Justice Nehring upheld the trial court's ruling and also ruled that in order to challenge rulings made at trial, an appellant must adequately brief the issues asserted on appeal, must provide to the appellate court an adequate record to support the contentions raised in the appeal, and must procedurally and properly challenge the trial court's decision in order for the appeal before relief on appeal can be granted by an appellate court.
