= Pamela Greenwood =

American lawyer

Pamela T. Greenwood

Judge of the Utah Court of Appeals
- In office 1987–2009
- Appointed by: Governor Norman H. Bangerter

Personal details
- Education: University of Utah (B.A.), University of Utah College of Law (J.D., 1972)
- Alma mater: University of Utah; University of Utah College of Law
- Occupation: Lawyer; Judge
- Known for: Pioneer woman lawyer in Utah; first woman president of both Salt Lake County Bar and Utah State Bar; presiding judge of the Utah Court of Appeals

Pamela T. Greenwood is the former presiding judge of the Utah Court of Appeals and was a pioneer woman lawyer in the state of Utah.

== Early life and education ==
Pamela Greenwood attended the University of Utah, graduating with a bachelor's degree in music. She obtained her law degree from the University of Utah College of Law in 1972 where she was a member of the Utah Law Review and elected to the Bar & Gavel Society. She was an associate professor at the law school from 1972–1977.

== Legal career ==
During the years between her admission to the bar in 1972 and appointment to the court, she practiced general civil law in the areas of real estate, corporate law, employment, domestic law, and bankruptcy. From 1976 to 1977, she worked at the Salt Lake City law firm of Roe and Fowler. From 1977 to 1980, she was counsel to the Utah State Bar and became the first woman president of both the Salt Lake County Bar and the Utah State Bar. She was also general counsel and vice president at First Interstate Bank of Utah for seven years.

Judge Greenwood served as interim Utah state court administrator in 1995, while still attending to and fulling her responsibilities on the Court of Appeals. She has served on numerous committees of both the Bar and the courts and was presiding judge for the Court of Appeals for two separate terms.

Judge Greenwood has served as an arbitrator for the Bar's fee dispute arbitration program and completed an Arbitration Training Institute sponsored by the American Bar Association Section of Dispute Resolution.

== Judicial career ==
Judge Greenwood was appointed by Gov. Norman H. Bangerter in January 1987. Judge Greenwood joined the Court of Appeals, at its formation. She was certified by the Utah Judicial Council for retention in the 2008 General Election and was retained in office. She retired on December 31, 2009.

== Selected cases ==
- Miller v. State
- STATE v. C.K. and S.K., Appellees

== Awards and accomplishments ==
The Women Lawyers of Utah named Judge Greenwood as the Woman Lawyer of the Year in 1993 and the Bar honored her with a Special Service Award in 1996. She also received the Dorathy Merrill Brothers Award for the advancement of women in the legal profession in 2002 and a Distinguished Judicial Service Award in 2010 from the Bar. In 2011 Judge Greenwood received a Lifetime Service award from the Utah State Bar.

Judge Greenwood is currently a member of the Women Lawyers of Utah, the Utah chapter of the Fellows of the American Bar Foundation, the American Inns of Court, and the S.J. Quinney College of Law Board of Trustees. Judge Greenwood also served as vice chair of the Utah Judicial Council from 1992 to 1998. She was acting State Court administrator from January 1995 to September 1995.
