= George W. Latimer =

American lawyer

George Webster Latimer (November 28, 1900 – May 3, 1990) was a Utah lawyer best known for representing Lt. William Calley Jr. in his court martial for the My Lai incident. Latimer was also a justice of the Utah Supreme Court from 1946 to 1951 and one of the three original members of the U.S. Court of Military Appeals from 1951 to 1961.

== Early life ==
Latimer was born in Draper, Utah, to John and Petria Jensen Latimer and attended Salt Lake Public Schools. In 1924, he graduated from the University of Utah College of Law, where he was a member of Delta Theta Phi law fraternity. As an undergraduate at the University of Utah he was a member of Sigma Pi fraternity.

Latimer practiced law in Salt Lake City from 1924 to 1940. He joined the Utah National Guard in 1925.

On October 5, 1929, Latimer married Rhoda Caroll. They had two children.

== World War II ==
During World War II, Latimer spent three years in the Pacific Theater with the Fortieth Infantry Division. He rose the rank of colonel and was the division’s chief of staff. Latimer participated in four landings and was awarded the Bronze Star and the Legion of Merit. He continued his work with the National Guard after the war and rose to the rank of brigadier general.

== Legal career ==
=== Judge ===
In 1946, Latimer defeated incumbent Martin M. Larson to win election to the Utah Supreme Court, and was sworn in for a 10-year term. In 1951, he resigned to accept an appointment by President Harry S. Truman to the newly formed U.S. Court of Military Appeals. Latimer was instrumental in interpreting the Uniform Code of Military Justice after it was adopted at the end of World War II. He noted in a 1956 address to the military’s Judge Advocate Generals that civilian courts were beginning to call on the Court of Military Appeals for judicial opinions relating to military judicial subjects. He said that this was a good sign that the Uniform Code of Military Justice had established an acceptable court system.

=== Law firm ===
Latimer became a partner in the Salt Lake City firm of Parsons, Behle, and Latimer in 1961. He served as its president until retiring in 1973 but remained as a counsel to the firm until 1985.

=== Board of pardons ===
In 1965, Latimer was appointed to the Utah State Board of Pardons. He served on the board until 1979. During that time he presided over the commutation hearings of murderer Gary Gilmore. He never voted to commute a death sentence as he thought he should not overrule the decision of a judge and jury.

=== Calley case ===
In 1969, Latimer was hired to represent Calley at his court-martial. He was hired by Calley after phoning him to express his support for Calley's predicament. Latimer was criticised for the poor defence case he put forwards, including mispronouncing names and getting facts wrong (in one case, needing to be corrected by a juror). Latimer worked on the case until 1974, with appeals in the military and civilian courts. Calley was initially sentenced to life imprisonment, but the sentence was reduced on several occasions. A U.S. district judge eventually found that Calley’s military trial was conducted in a way that violated his constitutional rights.

In 1977, Latimer won the Utah State Bar’s Lawyer of the Year Award. He was a member of the Kiwanis and a director for the Salvation Army.
