= Cottonwood West, Utah =

- Former CDP
- Cottonwood High School and the Wasatch Range
- Interactive map of Cottonwood West, Utah
- Coordinates: 40°38′44″N 111°50′55″W
- Country: United States
- State: Utah
- County: Salt Lake

Area
  - Total: 4.0 sq mi (10.4 km^{2})
  - Land: 4.0 sq mi (10.4 km^{2})
  - Water: 0 sq mi (0.0 km^{2})

Population (2000)
  - Total: 18,727
  - Density: 4,656/sq mi (1,797.5/km^{2})
- Time zone: UTC-7 (Mountain (MST))
  - Summer (DST): UTC-6 (MDT)
- Area codes: 385, 801
- FIPS code: 49-16395

Cottonwood West was a census-designated place (CDP) in Salt Lake County, Utah, United States. The CDP was situated between the cities of Holladay and Murray, which by the mid-2000s had annexed virtually all of the area between them.

The population was 18,727 at the 2000 census, a slight increase over the 1990 census figure of 17,476. The area was known as South Cottonwood during the 1980 census, at which time the population was 11,117.

== Geography ==
Cottonwood West was located at 40°38′44″N 111°50′55″W (40.645647, -111.848566).

According to the United States Census Bureau, the CDP had a total area of 4.0 square miles (10.4 km^{2}), all land.

== Demographics ==
Historical population
Census	Pop.	Note	%±
1980	11,117		—
1990	17,476		57.2%
2000	18,727		7.2%

As of the census of 2000, there were 18,727 people, 7,853 households, and 5,096 families residing in the CDP. The population density was 4,655.4 people per square mile (1,798.6/km^{2}). There were 8,248 housing units at an average density of 2,050.4/mi^{2} (792.2/km^{2}). The racial makeup of the CDP was 93.08% White, 0.78% African American, 0.46% Native American, 2.35% Asian, 0.18% Pacific Islander, 1.29% from other races, and 1.86% from two or more races. Hispanic or Latino of any race were 4.20% of the population.

There were 7,853 households, out of which 24.6% had children under the age of 18 living with them, 51.7% were married couples living together, 10.0% had a female householder with no husband present, and 35.1% were non-families. 28.3% of all households were made up of individuals, and 11.4% had someone living alone who was 65 years of age or older. The average household size was 2.38 and the average family size was 2.95.

In the CDP, the population was spread out, with 20.5% under the age of 18, 10.8% from 18 to 24, 25.8% from 25 to 44, 24.5% from 45 to 64, and 18.4% who were 65 years of age or older. The median age was 40 years. For every 100 females, there were 89.9 males. For every 100 females age 18 and over, there were 87.4 males.

The median income for a household in the CDP was $48,645, and the median income for a family was $60,823. Males had a median income of $39,316 versus $30,587 for females. The per capita income for the CDP was $27,023. About 3.8% of families and 5.3% of the population were below the poverty line, including 7.1% of those under age 18 and 4.2% of those age 65 or over.
