= Zerubbabel Snow =

American judge and LDS Church leader (1809–1888)

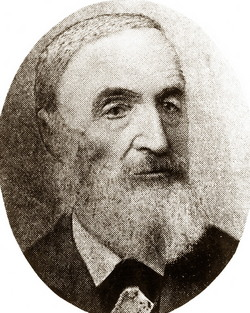

First Quorum of the Seventy
- 1835 (aged 26) – September 27, 1888
- Called by: Heber J. Grant

Associate Justice of the Supreme Court of the Territory of Utah
- 1850 – 1854

Attorney General of the Territory of Utah
- February 19, 1869 –

Personal details
- Born: Zerubbabel Snow; March 29, 1809; St. Johnsbury, Vermont, United States
- Died: September 27, 1888 (aged 79); Salt Lake City, Utah Territory, United States
- Resting place: Salt Lake City Cemetery; 40°46′37.92″N 111°51′28.8″W
- Spouse(s): Susan Slater Lang; Mary Augusta Hawkins; Mary Lavina Sawyer (née Stone)
- Parents: Levi Snow; Lucina Streeter

Zerubbabel Snow (March 29, 1809 – September 27, 1888) was an early leader in the Latter Day Saint movement, a Mormon pioneer, and a Supreme Court Justice and Attorney General of the Territory of Utah.

== Biography ==
Snow was born in St. Johnsbury, Vermont to Levi and Lucina (Streeter) Snow. He was taught about Mormonism by missionaries Orson Pratt and Lyman E. Johnson and baptized into the Church of Christ in 1832. On August 23, 1832, Snow and Amasa M. Lyman were ordained to the priesthood office of elder by Joseph Smith and Frederick G. Williams, and the two of them immediately departed on a proselytizing mission.

In 1833, Snow returned to Vermont and married Susan Slater Lang. He remained in Vermont until 1834, when he went to Ohio to become a member of Smith's Zion's Camp expedition to Missouri.

His first wife, Susan Slater Lang, died in Ohio after delivering their only child, a daughter, Susan Lizette Snow (born March 14, 1841), who later married Orson Pratt Jr. After the death of his wife, Susan, Snow married Mary Augusta Hawkins on August 25, 1841. This wife bore to him the following children: Cora Georganna Snow (1843–1915), Adelaide Louisa Snow (1852–1919), Zerubbabel "Zera" Levi Snow (1854–1922), George Wellington Snow (1856–1938), Herbert Walderman Snow (1863–1938) and Marion Mason Snow (1856–1939). In 1856, Snow married Mary Lavina Sawyer (née Stone), a widow who had a son (Walton O. Sawyer) by her previous marriage. This union did not produce Snow with any children.

In 1835, Snow was ordained to the priesthood office of seventy and became a member of the First Quorum of the Seventy. Snow and his family migrated with the Latter Day Saints from Ohio, to Iowa, and finally to Utah Territory.

In 1852 Snow was a missionary for the Church of Jesus Christ of Latter-day Saints in Virginia and Ohio. After serving as an associate justice of the Utah Territorial Supreme Court from 1850 to 1854, Snow also served an LDS mission to Australia from June 1856 to December 1858. On February 19, 1869, Snow was elected as the Attorney General of the Territory of Utah. He died in Salt Lake City, Utah Territory.

== See also ==
- Erastus Snow: Zerubbabel's brother
