= Bill McCarthy (NHS) =

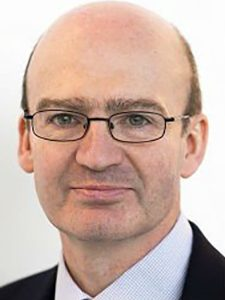
Bill McCarthy

Bill McCarthy is a former Director of Policy for NHS England. He is an economist. His previous roles include Chief Executive at NHS Yorkshire and the Humber, Chief Executive at City of York Council and Director-General at the Department of Health (2005–07) responsible for health and social care strategy, system reform, and policy development and implementation.

He was said by the Health Service Journal to be the 21st most powerful person in the English NHS in December 2013.

His salary of £175,000 (equivalent to £245,366 in 2025) was the twenty-eighth highest in the NHS in 2013.

McCarthy's departure from his post as NHS England Director of Policy was announced on 18 March 2014. He has worked in and out of the NHS with a role as deputy vice chancellor (operations) at the University of Bradford. And in April 2022 held the role as senior independent director for the Pennine Care NHS Foundation Trust.

On 12 December 2019, McCarthy gained a BSc in Economics with Politics from London University (Queen Mary College) and an MSc in Economics from the London School of Economics.

On 1 January 2023 he had been appointed as the interim chair of the Greater Manchester Mental Health NHS Foundation Trust. With a term lasting up to 12 months
