= James H. Wolfe =

American judge (1884–1958)

James H. Wolfe (1884 – March 25, 1958) was a justice of the Utah Supreme Court from 1935 to 1954, and was chief justice from 1943 to 1944, and from 1951 to 1954.

== Early life and education ==
Born in Skippack, Pennsylvania, to Dr. Samuel and Emma Seipt Wolfe, he received a degree in mechanical engineering from Lehigh University, working in this field in Mexico and Tooele County, Utah. He then received a law degree from the University of Pennsylvania Law School, entering the practice of law in Salt Lake City, Utah, in 1911. He became "associated with the Democratic Party", and remained so throughout his life.

== Judicial service ==
In 1929, he became a Utah district court judge. In 1934, Wolfe defeated incumbent Daniel N. Straup to win election to the state supreme court. Wolfe was re-elected in 1944, and retired in 1954. During his service to the court, he authored nearly 1,000 opinions, and came to be "regarded in legal circles as an authority in constitutional and administrative law and the law of torts".

== Personal life and death ==
In 1918, Wolfe married Carolyn Williams, with whom he had four sons and one daughter.

Following his retirement, Wolfe moved to Vineburg, California, and died in Sonoma, California, following a lengthy illness, at the age of 74.

Political offices
Preceded by Daniel N. Straup	Justice of the Utah Supreme Court; 1935–1954	Succeeded by George W. Worthen
