= Roger I. McDonough =

American judge (1892-1966)

Chief Justice of the Utah Supreme Court
- In office 1947–1948
- Preceded by: Martin M. Larson
- Succeeded by: Eugene C. Pratt

Chief Justice of the Utah Supreme Court
- In office 1954–1959
- Preceded by: James H. Wolfe
- Succeeded by: J. Allen Crockett

Personal details
- Born: September 29, 1892 Park City, Utah
- Died: November 25, 1966 (aged 74)
- Spouse: Mildred Anne Devine
- Education: University of Notre Dame; University of Utah, S.J. Quinney College of Law

Roger I. McDonough (September 29, 1892 – November 25, 1966) was an American judge. He presided over Utah's Third Judicial District Court for ten years. Then in 1938 he was elected to the Utah Supreme Court, where he went on to serve as chief justice from 1947 to 1948 and 1954 to 1959. At the time of his death, his tenure was the longest of any judge or justice in the state's history. McDonough was known for his mediation efforts during the Strike wave of 1945–1946. In the response to the post-war labor crisis, President Harry S. Truman appointed him to the National Labor Relations Board. In this role, he served on multiple emergency fact-finding committees to help settle labor disputes in the steel and railroad industries.

McDonough was a member of the Sierra Club of Salt Lake City and served as its president in 1944. He was named to the Who's Who in America list beginning in 1946.

== Personal life and education ==
Roger I. McDonough was born September 29, 1892, in Park City, Utah. He was the son of Irish immigrants Bartley and Minnie Power McDonough. Upon graduation from Park City High School, he was hired to teach history and geography and eventually became principal of the Jefferson School. McDonough joined the army on October 3, 1917 and was commissioned as second lieutenant in the field artillery at Camp Jackson. Following the war, he received his education from Notre Dame University and the University of Utah Law School. He was a member of the Knights of Columbus and served as the organization's state deputy from 1921 to 1922.

He was married to Mildred Ann Devine by Catholic Archbishop John Joseph Mitty in San Francisco in May 1932. Together they raised five children; Roger James McDonough, John Vincent McDonough, Anne Moore (McDonough), Edward McDonough, and Gerald McDonough.

== Utah courts ==
Summit County

McDonough was admitted to the Utah Bar in 1925. From 1925 to 1927, he served as Summit County Attorney.

Third District Court

McDonough was a judge in Utah's Third District Court from 1928 to 1938. For six of those years, his fellow justices selected him to serve as presiding judge of the district court. One of the interesting cases before Judge McDonough's court was the 1935 conviction of Secretary of State Milton Welling on the charge of submitting a false salary request. Before sentencing, the Utah Supreme Court intervened; ultimately, Judge McDonough ordered a new trial, and the Secretary of State was acquitted. In 1938, he called a grand jury to investigate vice protection payoffs in Salt Lake County.

State Supreme Court

On November 8, 1938, Roger I. McDonough was elected to Utah’s supreme court, ousting William H. Folland by a vote of 10,728 to 6,578. He went on to win three consecutive 10-year terms on Utah’s high court. Within that time he served as chief justice from 1947 to 1949 and 1954 to 1959. At the time of his death, it was the longest tenure of any judge in Utah's history. Like previous justices of the Utah Supreme Court, McDonough was called upon to rule in polygamy prosecutions. In 1950, he was on a three-member panel that dismissed a polygamy prosecution on the grounds that the statute was too vague.

Immigration

Justice McDonough was the son of Irish immigrants who came to America seeking a better life. Over his tenure on Utah's bench, Justice McDonough granted thousands of men and women petitions for US citizenship. In 1935, McDonough assured the citizenship of 160 foreign-born class graduates after the requirement of court examination was replaced with earned diplomas. The program encompassed American schools and adult-learning programs within Salt Lake City, as well as the Neighborhood house, Chapman Branch Library and Mexican Mission. In 1950, he was one of 21 distinguished Americans to serve on an awards jury appointed by the Freedom Foundation. The jury selected schools whose programs for teaching citizenship had been outstanding that year. During the onset of WW2, he presided over a mass naturalization and allegiance ceremony which granted nearly 250 men and women US Citizenship. According to the Salt Lake Tribune, Justice McDonough described the heritage of American citizenship as not consisting of material things, which can be enjoyed without citizenship, but as being the privileges of a social organization. He was quoted as stating: “American government is not a machine without soul or purpose, as are the philosophies of Hitler and Stalin. May you ever be faithful to your oath, to the end that your children, too, may enjoy that heritage.”

Women in Law

In 1953, Lane Wilkins was one of only three women students in her graduating class at S.J. Quinney College of Law. It was noted in her obituary that during a time when most law firms declined to interview women, then Utah Supreme Court Chief Justice Roger I. McDonough decided she was qualified to clerk for him. Wilkins went on to become a Professor of Law at the University of Utah, and as such the first female administrator in the law school's history.

Gerrymandering and Voting Rights

In Parkinson v. Watson, 291 P.2d 400 (Utah 1955), Utah's 1955 Legislative Reapportionment Act was upheld to be constitutional by a 4–1 vote of the State Supreme Court. The establishment reversed a decision by Judge AH Elliot holding the act to be in violation of constitutional provisions requiring representation on a basis of population. Chief Justice McDonough filed the court's sole dissent, primarily based on the Utah Legislature's use of a double ratio in appropriating the Senate. In McDonough's three-page dissenting opinion he wrote: "The opinion of the court states that a single ratio for each house could be used in such manner, if the legislature set about to do so, as to result in grossly disproportionate representation. Of course it could, if the legislature paid no attention to the concededly basic principle leavening the whole of Article IX, and this court stood mute. But it requires no mathematical acumen to demonstrate that the potential of distortion is infinitely greater if a multiple ratio be used.”

LGBT Rights

In 1963, Jean Sinclair was tried in Utah's Third District Court for murder in the first degree. The state argued the motive was Sinclair's unnatural relationship with LaRae Peterson, that she had such an impassioned attachment to her, and held resentment toward the male victim. In an appeal, the record disclosed that Jean Sinclair was asked the following question: "Well, I'll put it this way then. Have you had any homosexual acts with Jean or she with you?" Upon the advice of her counsel she refused to answer this question, even though the court ordered her to do so. As a result, Judge Snow ordered Peterson to five days in jail for contempt of court. In response, Justice McDonough said the judge “clearly erred” in finding the witness in contempt and ordered an immediate reversal of the lower court's finding. He argued the appellant was justified in refusing to answer the question, noting his concurring opinion in Sadleir v. Young, Sheriff where the privilege granted a witness not to answer a question which has a tendency to degrade under the provisions of what was then Section 104-49-20, R.S.U. 1933, and which is now Section 78-24-9, U.C.A. 1953. McDonough explained, “the issue in the case of the State of Utah v. Jean Sinclair was whether the defendant therein was guilty of murder. Whether or not Jean Sinclair and appellant herein had indulged in homosexual relations with each other was not an issue in the case, nor was it a fact from which the fact of homicide or murder could be presumed. It might have a tendency to prove motive for such an act. However, motive is not a necessary element in the offense of homicide and proof of motive does not establish guilt nor does absence of motive prove innocence.”

== Presidential appointments ==
On December 31, 1945, President Harry S. Truman appointed Judge McDonough, with University of Wisconsin Law Professor Nathan Feinsinger and Missouri Supreme Court Chief Justice James Marsh Douglas, to a presidential fact-finding board, to investigate an ongoing labor dispute in the steel industry in which 700,000 steelworkers threatened to strike. The strike was not averted, but the board's report contributed to the eventual settlement.

In 1946 he was offered an appointment to the International Military Tribunal War Crimes Court (Nuremberg Trials) in Germany, but declined.

On March 15, 1949, President Truman appointed the Wabash Strike Fact Board by Executive Order 10045 Pursuant to Section 10 of the Railway Labor Act. Roger I. McDonough, chief justice of the Utah Supreme court, was selected as chairman. Additional board members included Curtis G. Shake, former member of the Indiana Supreme court, and John W. Yeager, associate justice of the Nebraska Supreme court. The board was ordered to investigate and report in respect to a dispute involving the Wabash Railroad Co. and the Ann Arbor Railroad Co., carriers, and certain employees represented by the Brotherhood of Locomotive Engineers, Brotherhood of Locomotive Firemen and Enginemen, Order of Railway Conductors, and Brotherhood of Railroad Trainmen.

In 1950, President Truman appointed McDonough to an emergency board to help settle labor disputes and avert a nationwide railroad strike.
