= J. Allen Crockett =

American judge (1906–1994)

Chief Justice of the Utah Supreme Court
- In office 1959–1961
- Preceded by: Roger I. McDonough
- Succeeded by: Lester M. Wade

Chief Justice of the Utah Supreme Court
- In office 1967–1970
- Preceded by: F. Henri Henriod
- Succeeded by: E. R. Callister

Chief Justice of the Utah Supreme Court
- In office 1979–1981
- Preceded by: A. H. Ellett
- Succeeded by: Richard J. Maughan

Personal details
- Born: 1906 Smithfield, Utah
- Died: November 9, 1994 (aged 87–88)

J. Allen Crockett (1906–1994) was a justice of the Utah Supreme Court from 1951 to 1981 – longer than anyone else in Utah's history. During his long tenure on the court, he was Chief Justice three times: from 1959 to 1961, from 1967 to 1970, and from 1979 to 1981.

== Early career ==
Crockett was born in Smithfield, Cache County. He attended East High School. He received a Bachelor of Arts degree and a bachelor of laws from the University of Utah. Crockett served as deputy Salt Lake County attorney from 1933 to 1938. Crockett was campaign manager for Reva Beck Bosone in her 1939 campaign for city police judge. Crockett served as secretary and counsel to the Public Service Commission from 1939 to 1940 and as a ward and district chairman of the Democratic party prior to his election in 1940 to the Third District Court. In 1947, during the polio epidemic, Crockett was Salt Lake County chairman for the March of Dimes campaign.

== On the Bench ==
Crockett served as a 3rd District judge from 1941 to 1951. As the Democratic party nominee for Supreme Court justice in 1950, Judge Crockett spoke in favor of criminal justice reform. In November 1950, he was elected to the Utah Supreme Court, narrowly defeating Republican candidate District Judge Joseph E. Nelson. He took office in 1951, and served three 10-year terms. A hiker, he once hiked through Zion Narrows with United States Supreme Court Justice William O. Douglas. He was given a Distinguished Lawyer Emeritus Award by the Utah Bar Association in March 1987.
