= Constitution of Utah =

American state constitution

Overview
- Jurisdiction: Utah
- Created: 1895
- Presented: 1895
- Ratified: 1896

Government structure
- Branches: 3
- Chambers: Bicameral
- Executive: Governor

The Constitution of the State of Utah defines the basic form and operation of state government in Utah.

== History ==
Utahns had drafted seven previous constitutions starting in 1849 as part of repeated attempts to become a state. In 1850, the federal government created the Utah territory, with a secular government. Utah was still prohibited from joining the union, due to the practice of polygamy in Utah. In 1890, The Church of Jesus Christ of Latter-day Saints renounced polygamy, which gave Utah permission from the federal government to begin drafting a constitution. The Utah Constitution was drafted at a convention that opened on March 4, 1895, in Salt Lake City. The constitution was later approved by the citizens of Utah. It took several attempts to get a constitution approved by Congress, which admitted Utah as a state in 1896.

== Rights enshrined in the Utah Constitution ==
Beginning with Hansen v. Owens, 619 P.2d 315 (Utah 1980), the Utah Supreme Court embarked upon a short-lived venture during which the court interpreted Article I, § 12 of the Utah Constitution as providing greater protection against self-incrimination than that which is provided by the Fifth Amendment. The Hansen decision was based upon the unique language of Article I, § 12, which speaks in terms being compelled "to give evidence against [one]self" rather than being compelled "to be a witness against [one]self." A mere five years later the court retreated from this position and in American Fork City v. Crosgrove, 701 P.2d 1069 (Utah 1985), overruled Hansen. This, however, did not put an end to the notion that the Utah Constitution may provide greater protection than does the federal Bill of Rights.

It is now clear that Article I, § 14 of the Utah Constitution provides greater protection to the privacy of the home and automobiles than does the Fourth Amendment. The expansion of the protection afforded by the state constitution has not been based upon distinctions in the language used, nor has it been the result of Utah's unique political and religious history. The Utah Supreme Court has embraced broader constructions as "an appropriate method for insulating this state's citizens from the vagaries of inconsistent interpretations given to the fourth amendment by the federal courts."

The Utah Supreme Court has repeatedly invited litigants to raise and adequately brief state constitutional issues. In Brigham City v. Stuart, 2005 UT 13, ¶10, 122 P. 3d 506, 510, the Utah Supreme Court expressed "surpris[e]" in "[t]he reluctance of litigants to take up and develop a state constitutional analysis," ibid., the court expressly invited future litigants to bring challenges under the Utah Constitution to enable it to fulfill its "responsibility as guardians of the individual liberty of our citizens" and "undertak[e] a principled exploration of the interplay between federal and state protections of individual rights," id., at 511.

== Unusual provisions ==
The original and current editions of the constitution have some unusual or unique provisions:

- Originally, a jury was to be eight people at most (unless for a trial of a person charged with a capital crime) and seven for a grand jury, and four for inferior courts.
- Spousal privilege is only for 1 man and 1 woman together and not polygamy
- Voting machines (referred to as "mechanical contrivance[s]") are allowed provided they be secret.
- Slavery was explicitly allowed "as a punishment for crime" until it was repealed by voters in 2020.
- Women's suffrage and equality is guaranteed in all matters.
  - Minimum wage for women and minors
- An ordinance was added which required the consent of the United States, as well as the state, to revoke or alter parts of the constitution. In part:
  - Besides the normal (And previously stated) freedom of religion, polygamy and "plural marriages" are "forever prohibited".
  - Public schooling is required and must be "free from sectarian control" – this is stated twice, once in the Ordinance, and once in Article X ("Education").
- Lotteries and other forms of gambling cannot be legalized
- Once an impeachable official is served a notice of impeachment, the official automatically loses the powers of the office until acquitted.
- A two-thirds supermajority is required to specify the enactment of an act at a time other than the default.
- The Governor may call both chambers of the Utah Legislature, or only the Utah State Senate, into extraordinary session, but not the House of Representatives alone.
- The Governor, Attorney General, and the Auditor comprise the Board of Prison Commissioners and Insane Asylum Commissioners, and with the Superintendent of Public Instruction, the Board of Reform School Commissioners.
- No Judge can appoint a relative closer than a cousin to his court.
- A judge out of state for more than 90 days running automatically loses his bench.
- An agricultural college must be supported by the state
- The Legislature and State Board of Education are forbidden from selecting the textbooks to be used.
- The schools of the state must teach the metric system, Article X § 11 (repealed).
- Corporations running prior to the adoption of the constitution had to explicitly agree (by filing an affidavit with the Utah Secretary of State) to the new constitution.
- No one may bring an "armed ... bod[y] of men" into the state without approval.
- Labor blacklisting is explicitly outlawed.
- Women and children under the age of 14 are prohibited from working in underground mines
- Prison labor is prohibited outside of the prison, unless for public works projects
- Blacklists and their exchange are prohibited
- Eight hours is a full day for workers on public projects.
- Forests of the state get a one section article (XVIII) requiring they be preserved.
- Besides the state capitol, the location of the state fair, special schools, state prison, reform school, and insane asylum are explicitly set down, and "permanently located".
- When voting for or against the draft constitution, voters were to be given a ballot with both "yes" and "no". They then had to erase the word they disagreed with (that is, erase "no" to vote "yes").

== See also ==
- Parley Parker Christensen, Utah and California politician, Secretary of the convention.
