= Utah Supreme Court =

Highest court in the U.S. state of Utah

Coordinates: 40.759497°N 111.888918°W

- Seal of the Utah Judiciary

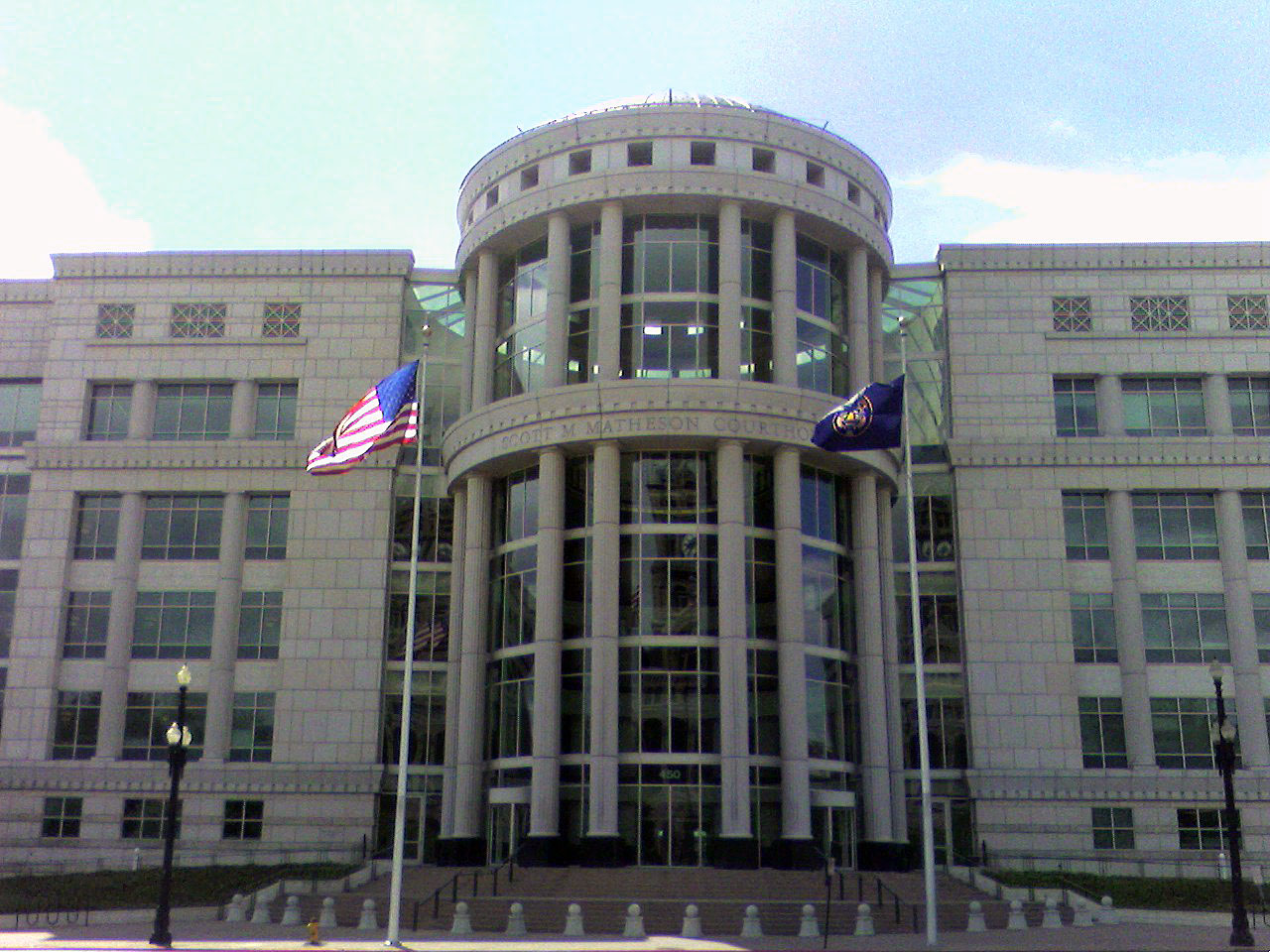
- Scott M. Matheson Courthouse
- Interactive map of Utah Supreme Court
- Established: 1894
- Jurisdiction: Utah
- Location: Salt Lake City
- Composition method: Executive appointment with legislative confirmation and retention elections
- Authorised by: Utah State Constitution
- Appeals to: Supreme Court of the United States
- Number of positions: 7
- Website: Official site

Chief Justice
- Currently: Jill Pohlman (acting)
- Since: August 31, 2026

The Utah Supreme Court is the supreme court of the state of Utah, United States. It has final authority of interpretation of the Utah Constitution. The Utah Supreme Court is composed of seven members: a chief justice, an associate chief justice, and five other justices. All justices are appointed by the governor of Utah, with confirmation by the Utah Senate. The chief justice is appointed to that position by the governor, while the associate chief justice is chosen by a majority vote of their fellow justices.

== History ==
Before present-day Utah became a state, it was organized into a provisional state, called the State of Deseret. Its constitution established a three-member supreme court. In 1850, the United States Congress passed "An Act to Establish a Territorial Government for Utah", Section 9 of which provided that "the judicial power of said territory shall be vested in a Supreme Court, District Court, and Justices of the Peace". This act converted Deseret's supreme court into a territorial supreme court with expanded jurisdiction.

In 1894, the United States Congress passed an Enabling Act, which called a convention to draft a constitution for Utah, another step towards statehood. The Enabling Act provided that Utah's territorial courts would be succeeded by new state courts with the same structure and jurisdiction. When Utah became a state on January 4, 1896, its constitution took effect, and Utah's territorial supreme court was replaced by a new state supreme court. The constitution provided that the court would have three members, but that the Utah Legislature could expand its membership to five after 1905, an option it ultimately exercised.

In 1998, the Utah Supreme Court moved into its current courthouse, named for Governor Scott M. Matheson. The multimillion-dollar building was nicknamed the "Taj Mahal" by some critics over its cost. Prior to that, the court met in the Utah State Capitol.

=== 2026 Expansion ===
After a series of rulings against the state legislature by the court on gerrymandering, abortion, and other issues, Republican legislators introduced a bill in the 2026 session to expand the court from five to seven members. While Republicans claimed that the bill was intended to speed up rulings, it was widely viewed as an attempt to "pack the court" in order to get more favorable rulings and was opposed by Democrats and the Forward Party senator, along with a few Republicans. A poll commissioned by Better Boundaries found that two-thirds of Republicans, 69% of unaffiliated voters, and nearly three-fourths of Democrats believe that the expansion of the court was driven by politics instead of efficiency. The Utah State Bar also opposed the addition of seats to the Supreme Court. The bill passed the Utah Senate 21–8 on January 26 and the Utah House of Representatives 57–18 on January 30. Republican Governor Spencer Cox signed the bill on January 31. The Utah Legislature had previously stripped the Utah Supreme Court of the power to select its own Chief Justice in 2025 in response to these rulings, giving that power to the Governor instead.

== Supreme Court justices ==
The Governor of Utah nominates justices from a list created by a judicial nominating commission each time a vacancy arises. The nominee must then be confirmed by a majority of the Utah Senate to take office. If confirmed, the justice is subjected to a nonpartisan, "unopposed retention election at the first general election held more than three years after appointment" and every ten years thereafter.

Name	Start	Term ends	Appointer	Law school
Jill Pohlman, Acting Chief Justice	August 17, 2022	January 4, 2037	Spencer Cox (R)	Utah
Paige Petersen	January 19, 2018	January 3, 2033	Gary Herbert (R)	Yale
John Nielsen	December 1, 2025	January 6, 2031	Spencer Cox (R)	BYU
Jay Jorgensen	June 17, 2026	January 6, 2031	Spencer Cox (R)	BYU
Stephen Dent	June 22, 2026	January 6, 2031	Spencer Cox (R)	Utah
Matthew Bell	September 26, 2026	January 6, 2031	Spencer Cox (R)	BYU
Michael Menssen	September 26, 2026	January 6, 2031	Spencer Cox (R)	UVA
