= Time to Get Tough =

2011 book by Donald Trump

- First edition cover
- Author: Donald Trump; Wynton Hall; Peter Schweizer; Meredith McIver
- Audio read by: Malcolm Hillgartner (2011); Jim Meskimen (2012)
- Original title: Time to Get Tough: Making America #1 Again
- Language: English
- Subject: American politics
- Publisher: Regnery Publishing
- Publication date: 2011
- Publication place: United States
- Media type: Print (hardcover)
- Pages: 256
- ISBN: 978-1596987739
- OCLC: 730403828
- Preceded by: Midas Touch (2011)
- Followed by: Crippled America (2015)
- Website: Official website

Time to Get Tough: Making America #1 Again is a non-fiction book by Donald Trump. It was published in hardcover format by Regnery Publishing in 2011, and reissued under the title Time to Get Tough: Make America Great Again! in 2015 to match Trump's 2016 election campaign slogan. Trump had previously published The America We Deserve (2000) as preparation for his attempt to run in the 2000 U.S. presidential campaign with a populist platform. Time to Get Tough in contrast served as his prelude to the 2012 U.S. presidential campaign, with a conservative platform.

In the book, Trump argues that he would be an effective leader of the United States. Mixing personal stories with his prescriptions for U.S. policy, Trump recounts lessons learned as host of The Celebrity Apprentice and his experience being satirized at the 2011 White House Correspondents' Association Dinner. On domestic policy, Trump recommends abolishing U.S. corporate tax and raising the retirement age. On foreign policy, he criticizes the negative impact of China and OPEC on the U.S. Trump praises Russian leader Vladimir Putin, saying, "I respect Putin and the Russians". Time to Get Tough asserts business experience can be transposed into governmental success, and that experiences in global finance deals can help negotiate governmental agreements.

Breitbart News contributors Wynton Hall and Peter Schweizer helped write the book, as did writer Meredith McIver. The book debuted at No. 27 on The New York Times Best Seller list. A book review from On the Issues was critical, noting how Trump had flip-flopped on political views from his previous policy book. The New York Review of Books called the book's domestic-policy writing style boring. Washington Post book critic Carlos Lozada criticized Trump for lambasting The New York Times on his campaign while simultaneously advertising the book as a New York Times Best Seller. Entertainment Weekly called the work a "diatribe against the Obama presidency, illegal immigration, and the people and media outlets who have dared to criticize him."

== Summary ==
Time to Get Tough describes Trump's views on the state of the United States in 2011 and was intended to inform Americans about his ideals. The book explains why he believed the U.S. economy was suffering, criticizes President Barack Obama, and describes ideals which would guide him if he were leading the country. In the book, he calls America "the greatest country the world has ever known."

The book mixes Trump's political ideology with personal anecdotes. He asserts that Lady Gaga owes him her success because she performed at Miss Universe 2008 six months before her first number one hit. A document in the book describes his financial position and asserts his economic value to be US$ 7 billion. Trump says his time as host of The Celebrity Apprentice helped his brand and says the experience taught him that a person with negative characteristics can be successful if their TV ratings are high. He also recalls his feelings while being satirized at the 2011 White House Correspondents' Association Dinner by President Obama, and criticizes the comedic performance of Seth Meyers.

Trump divides a discussion of U.S. domestic policy into sections on social programs, healthcare, and taxes, each of which starts with a criticism of Obama. Trump calls the Patient Protection and Affordable Care Act a type of socialized medicine and says it will harm employment. Trump describes a plan for four tiers of income taxes, with the top bracket being taxed at 15 percent on annual income above US$1 million, and abolishing corporate tax in the United States. With regards to Social Security, Trump recommends lifting the retirement age and spending the savings elsewhere. Other chapters express support for increased military spending and criticism of free trade, and call for curtailing immigration to the United States. He criticizes illegal immigration, saying it causes economic harm to American citizens.

On foreign policy, Trump writes critically of the impact of China and OPEC on the U.S. He offers a list of leadership qualities he calls necessary to negotiate with them and says the U.S. requires a leader with firm ideals who can stand firm during international negotiations. Other recommendations include a lawsuit against OPEC and a 25 percent tax on all products imported from China. He expresses his doubt that China would refuse trade deals because the U.S. market is so lucrative.

Time to Get Tough also details Trump's favorable views about Russian leader Vladimir Putin as a person and his methods of governing. He writes that Putin has a unique plan for Russia and praises Putin's strategy to dominate neighboring countries in the region and become the primary oil supplier for European countries. But Trump also criticizes President Obama for not doing more to oppose Putin.

Trump asserts that his business experience, which included negotiations with difficult and stubborn people, would easily translate to the public sector and international relations. He expresses interest in moving high finance businessmen to the global stage, writing that America requires new leadership from those with experience in cutthroat financial private sector tactics.

== Composition and publication ==
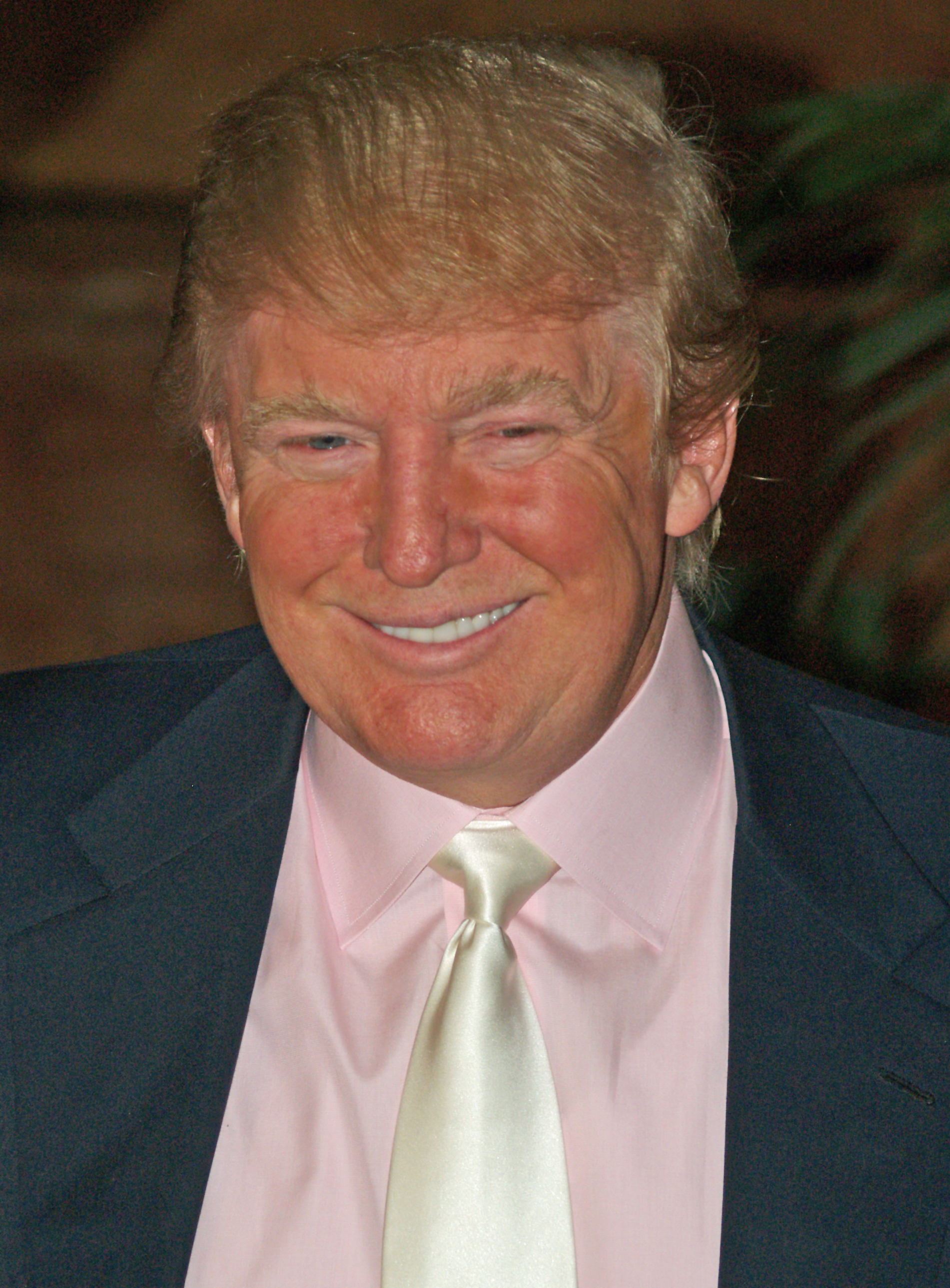
Donald Trump

Time to Get Tough functioned as a prelude to Trump's 2012 U.S. presidential campaign, similar to the way 2000 book The America We Deserve served as preparation for his attempt to run in the 2000 U.S. presidential campaign. The America We Deserve presented his campaign as a populist platform, whereas Time to Get Tough displayed how Trump's views had changed and were more aligned with conservative political ideals.

Ghostwriters on the book included Breitbart News Managing Editor Wynton Hall and Senior Editor-at-Large Peter Schweizer. Meredith McIver also contributed to the writing process. Trump held a book signing at Trump Tower in New York City to promote the work. Trump traveled to Chicago in 2011 to market the work, and was interviewed by Carol Felsenthal in Chicago.

The new title for the 2015 edition, Time to Get Tough: Make America Great Again!, matched Trump's campaign slogan in the 2016 election for U.S. president. The Washington Post contacted the book's publisher to inquire what had changed about the book for the 2015 edition. A representative for the publisher responded to The Washington Post, "many of the changes are minimal on the interior".

The book was first published in 2011 in hardcover format by Regnery Publishing. An ebook was released the same year, along with an audiobook read by Malcolm Hillgartner. A Russian language print edition was published in 2011. Another audiobook was released in 2012, this time read by Jim Meskimen. The book was reissued in 2015 by Regnery Publishing in paperback format, this time with the new title. This edition was published in Vietnamese in 2016, and in Japanese in 2017.

== Sales and reception ==
The book debuted on several of The New York Times Best Seller lists on December 25, 2011, including the hardcover nonfiction section, combined hardcover and paperback nonfiction, e-book nonfiction, and combined print and e-book nonfiction. In all categories, it was near the 30th position. By January 8, 2012, the hardcover edition had risen to the sixth spot. Nielsen BookScan indicated 34,264 copies of the book had been sold by mid-2015 and showed interest in the book was increasing. The week after his election win in November 2016, the book sold 310 copies, representing a 675% increase in sales. The same month, the book made the National Post best seller list when a signed copy of the 2011 edition sold for $3,500 (~$5,009 in 2025), which the paper noted was the highest price for a book by Donald Trump successfully sold by bookseller AbeBooks. Trump reported in 2016 that he received between $100,000 and $1 million in income from total sales of the book.

A book review from On the Issues written by Jesse Gordon was critical, noting how Trump had flip-flopped on political views from his prior policy book, The America We Deserve. Gordon wrote that the book exhibited a swap by Trump on issues from supporting populism to espousing extreme right-wing values. He noted the book's purpose was to prepare his potential 2012 bid for president. Gordon concluded the book was Trump's way of garnering trust among conservatives. On the Issues published a table contrasting how his stated political preferences had changed from 2000, on issues including abortion, gun control, gay rights, tax reform, and health care. Carol Felsenthal of Chicago wrote that Trump's verbal style of braggadocio clearly came through in the work.

Michael Tomasky reviewed the work for The New York Review of Books, and echoed the assessment by On the Issues that it was a political tool for Trump's 2012 presidential aspirations. Tomasky observed the book was "comfortably within the standard campaign self-promotion genre" and marketed Trump as having a conservative ideology. He pointed out Trump used Regnery Publishing, a conservative book outlet. Tomasky wrote Trump's domestic policy proposals were boring. Stephan Lee, in a review for Entertainment Weekly, wrote that the book, "reads like a 190-page diatribe against the Obama presidency, illegal immigration, and the people and media outlets who have dared to criticize him." Carlos Lozada, nonfiction book critic for The Washington Post, pointed out the timing and purpose of the book. Lozada highlighted the contradictory nature of Trump's harsh criticism on the campaign trail for The New York Times, while simultaneously touting the book as a New York Times Best Seller on its cover. The Washington Post noted the name change of the book, writing, the 2011 version did not sync with his 2016 new political identity. Lozada felt the book's repackaging with minimal changes to content and significant changes to its exterior was a fitting metaphor "for the campaign of a real-estate developer."
