= Do as I Say =

Do As I Say
- the film's theatrical poster
- Directed by: Nick Tucker
- Screenplay by: Nick Tucker
- Based on: Do as I Say (Not as I Do): Profiles in Liberal Hypocrisy by Peter Schweizer
- Produced by: Frayda Levy; Rob Pfaltzgraff
- Cinematography: Lucas Abel
- Edited by: Lucas Abel; Nick Tucker
- Music by: Jeremiah Jacobs
- Production company: Moving Picture Institute
- Release dates: October 2, 2008 (Carnegie Institution, Washington D.C.)
- Running time: 83 min
- Language: English

Do As I Say is a 2008 documentary film based on the novel by Peter Schweizer titled Do as I Say (Not as I Do): Profiles in Liberal Hypocrisy. The book, an eight-week New York Times bestseller, was adapted for the screen by writer and director Nick Tucker. As the book's title indicates, several outspoken left-wing politicians and other public figures are profiled, and evidence is presented for the alleged hypocrisy seen in the disparity between what the individuals do and what they advocate publicly.

== Film content ==
The intent of the film is to expose the hypocrisy of left-wing public figures like Hillary Clinton, Noam Chomsky, Michael Moore, Ted Kennedy and Al Gore, by catching them in the act of doing things that they oppose.

Al Gore, for example, who "insists" that Americans drastically reduce their carbon footprint, is shown to use nearly twenty times the amount of electricity as an average American household.

Michael Moore, staunch anti-capitalist is shown to have significant investments in the stock market, including stock in companies like Halliburton, Pfizer, Merck, and "other companies he vilifies in his films". When Tucker brings a cake to Moore's residence to discuss the matter with him in person, Moore calls the police instead.

While "declaring war" on mortgage lending abuses, Hillary Clinton is accused to have engaged in predatory lending scheme with her husband President Bill Clinton known as the Whitewater controversy, in which more than half the people bought land from the Clintons in the Whitewater development project never received a property deed.

== Screenings and reception ==
The film was an official selection of several film festivals upon its release in 2008, including the Sacramento Film and Music Festival, the Newport Beach Film Festival, and the Southern California Business Film Festival at USC, and received largely positive reviews from critics and viewers, being described as a "hard-hitting documentary" that still retains its humor, making it "fun and fast-paced".

In an interview with journalist and film critic Christian Toto, Tucker how influential Michael Moore's films were in his own development as a filmmaker, and comments on how the film uses Michael Moore-like guerrilla filmmaking to Michael Moore's disadvantage. Tucker calls the Michael Moore segment "an homage" to the master.
