= Government Accountability Institute =

Conservative think tank

- Founded: 2012
- Type: 501(c)(3) organization
- Tax ID no.: 45-4681912
- Location: Tallahassee, Florida
- Region served: United States
- Key people: Peter Schweizer; Steve Bannon; Wynton Hall
- Revenue: $1.7 million (2014)
- Website: g-a-i.org

The Government Accountability Institute (GAI) is a right-wing think tank located in Tallahassee, Florida. GAI was founded in 2012 by Peter Schweizer and Steve Bannon with funding from Robert Mercer and family. Schweizer serves as the group's president.

The group's stated goal is to investigate and expose government corruption, misuse of taxpayer money, and crony capitalism. It is registered as a nonpartisan organization, but is largely focused on investigations of allegations related to the Democratic Party with many of the claims being later debunked or considered dubious.

== Overview ==
The Government Accountability Institute was set up by Steve Bannon as a tool for transmitting partisan dirt-digging and questionable opposition research to the mainstream media. "He realized that, though mainstream reporters were suspicious of partisan opinion, they were open to damning facts about public figures, regardless of the sourcing. He set out, with Schweizer, to produce material that would generate mainstream coverage, and right-wing outrage", wrote Jane Mayer in The New Yorker.

While GAI claims to be "a self-styled corruption watchdog group chaired and funded by conservative mega-donor Rebekah Mercer", the group has become a mainstay of alt-right media. Further, GAI's conspiracy theories, though debunked, have been legitimized in coverage by major news outlets such as The New York Times, the Associated Press, and The Washington Post.

Members of GAI's board of directors include Bannon, Peter Schweizer, Hunter Lewis, Ron Robinson (president of Young America's Foundation), and Wynton Hall. Former U.S. representative Jason Chaffetz joined GAI as a distinguished fellow in 2021.

== Funding ==
Between 2012 and 2014, GAI received donations of almost $4 million from the Mercer Family Foundation and the Koch brothers-affiliated Donors Trust.

In 2019, The New Yorker reported that most of GAI's funding came from tax-exempt donations from the family foundation of Robert Mercer, and that in the organization's 2017 tax filings it listed his daughter Rebekah as chairman of the GAI board.

== Activities ==
The Government Accountability Institute published several reports and books with premises and claims that were debunked after—or even before—publication.

In October 2012, GAI released a report insinuating that the Obama campaign had received contributions from donors who were not American citizens, which is illegal under U.S. law. The report claimed that "campaigns that aggressively raise money online are soliciting donations from people around the world—whether they intend to or not," and asserted that the Obama campaign lacked "rigorous screening for donors' citizenship". Multiple media sources debunked the claim, finding no evidence to support the report's allegations.

Clinton Cash: The Untold Story of How and Why Foreign Governments and Businesses Helped Make Bill and Hillary Rich is a 2015 book published by GAI that makes false claims about donations made to the Clinton Foundation by foreign entities, paid speeches made by Bill and Hillary Clinton, and the Clintons' personal enrichment since leaving the White House in 2001.

GAI was central in pushing the debunked conspiracy theory concerning alleged involvement by Hillary Clinton in the sale of Uranium One. Attorney General Jeff Sessions had John W. Huber investigate GAI's claims connecting the Clinton Foundation to the sale of the group of companies. Huber found no tangible evidence of impropriety.

Bush Bucks: How Public Service and Corporations Helped Make Jeb Rich, an e-book published by GAI in October 2015, raises questions about millions of dollars received by former Florida Governor Jeb Bush after he left office. The money came from companies which had benefited from Bush's policies while he was governor.

Another debunked book published by GAI is Secret Empires: How the American Political Class Hides Corruption and Enriches Family and Friends. It was the first printed source of the false Biden–Ukraine conspiracy theory, which GAI was heavily involved in promoting. When asked about GAI's role in media coverage of the allegations, Bannon replied, “It’s key. It was the predicate”.

== Links to Breitbart News ==
A November 2016 investigation by The Washington Post detailed ties between the Government Accountability Institute and the conservative website Breitbart News. Three GAI employees received full-time compensation while simultaneously being employed elsewhere. From 2012 to 2015, GAI co-founder and executive chair Bannon received $376,000 for working 30 hours a week. He simultaneously served as executive chairman of Breitbart. GAI communications strategist Wynton Hall received $600,000 during the same time. Hall worked as a writer for Breitbart and was promoted to managing editor in 2013. GAI president and treasurer Schweizer, also an at-large editor and writer for Breitbart, was paid $778,000 by the GAI from 2012 to 2015.

The Post noted that GAI's political advocacy raises questions about whether the 501(c)(3) organization has illegally intervened in political campaigns. The Post also found that, from 2013 to 2015, GAI purchased over $200,000 in advertising from the Breitbart website.
