= Crippled America =

2015 book by Donald Trump

Crippled America: How to Make America Great Again
- First edition cover
- Author: Donald Trump; David Fisher
- Original title: Crippled America: How to Make America Great Again
- Language: English
- Subject: American politics
- Published: November 3, 2015
- Publisher: Simon & Schuster
- Publication place: United States
- Media type: Hardcover
- Pages: 193
- ISBN: 978-1-5011-3796-9
- OCLC: 964317475
- Preceded by: Time to Get Tough (2011)

Crippled America: How to Make America Great Again is a non-fiction book by Donald Trump, first published in hardcover by Simon & Schuster in 2015. A revised edition was subsequently republished eight months later in trade paperback format under the title Great Again: How to Fix Our Crippled America. Like his previous work Time to Get Tough (2011) did for the U.S. presidential election in 2012, Crippled America outlined Trump's political agenda as he ran in the 2016 election on a conservative platform.

Trump makes his case for why he would be an effective leader of the United States, and reassures Republicans that he upholds conservative values. He criticizes the media's coverage of him while defending his decisions on the campaign trail. Crippled America stresses that the United States needs to start "winning again"; Trump asserts his business expertise can be translated into governmental success, that his "outsider" status can be utilized to negotiate agreements. On domestic policy issues, Trump recommends stricter border security and repealing the Affordable Care Act. As for foreign policy, he critically analyzes the impact of China on free trade.

The book debuted at number five on The New York Times Best Seller list. NPR characterized Crippled America as typical of similar campaign-trail books, providing only a basic outline of Trump's political agenda. A book review from On the Issues was positive, noting how Crippled America discredits assertions that Trump has no specific political stances. The New York Times reporter Michiko Kakutani criticized Trump for boasting about his business ventures while offering a dystopian view of the U.S. Regarding the book's writing style, CNN's Jeremy Diamond described Crippled America as being centered around "Trump's trademark simple prose, peppered with tangents".

== Contents summary ==
In Crippled America, Donald Trump describes his views on the United States in the past 20 years leading to 2015; Trump claims that career politicians, special interest groups, and lobbyists are culpable for the country's decline. Throughout the work, Trump criticizes President Barack Obama, and claims to have been unfairly criticized by the news media; he states that journalists, particularly Megyn Kelly, have written unfavorably about him as a result of his unexpected rise in the polls. Trump also describes the benefit of the media, noting how his outspoken personality and knack for hyperbole leads to more publicity. Regarding how he has flip-flopped on political views in the past, Trump reassures Republicans he is an ideal conservative; "I switched years ago, when I began to see what liberal Democrats were doing to our country. Now I'm a conservative Republican with a big heart". Trump outlines his policies on domestic and foreign issues were he to lead the country.

On U.S. domestic policy, Trump subdivides the book into chapters on immigration, health care, the economy, education, social programs, and energy. He supports reform that curtails illegal immigration to the U.S., delineating the American immigration system as a failure that has allowed violent criminals to enter the country. Trump proposes stronger security on the U.S. border with Mexico which would include the construction of a substantial border wall and cutting federal funds to sanctuary cities. An opponent of the Affordable Care Act, Trump states he favors repealing and replacing the federal statute with a free-market healthcare system. The work discusses Trump's support for investing in American infrastructure to help stimulate economic growth. His plan, he argues, would create 13 million jobs and the largest economic boom since Franklin D. Roosevelt's New Deal. With regards to the United States Department of Education, Trump makes a case to eliminate the department, have schools compete for students, and return educational policy-making to the state level. Trump describes himself as in favor of Social Security, is critical of alternative energy sources, and is skeptical of the human impact on climate change.

As for foreign policy issues, Trump discusses critically the impact of China on the U.S. The book refers to China as an "enemy" to American imports, further accusing the Chinese government of currency manipulation and corporate espionage. Trump recounts his financial standing with businesses in China, and believes the U.S. requires a firm leader to negotiate international trade deals. He concludes that, despite the complexity of the issue, the Chinese economy relies on trade with the U.S. as much as vice versa. Other significant subjects delved into within the book include Trump's analysis of the Syrian refugee crisis, the wars in Iraq and Afghanistan, and the strategy for combating ISIL.

Crippled America mixes Trump's political ideology with personal anecdotes. Trump reflects on his merits as a father as well as his faults as a husband; incidentally he blames himself for the failure of his two previous marriages. The book discusses his time gaining experience and life lessons under the tutelage of his father, Fred Trump. Crippled America includes an "About the author" chapter which provides an overview of Trump's financial assets and investments in real estate. Trump argues his accomplishments in business make him a model of success, that as a leader he would help the United States start "winning again". More discussion about Trump's transition to politics is provided: Trump asserts his outsider status on the political scene and experiences in the private sector would easily translate to governmental success; his expertise with negotiating global finance deals, he writes, can be utilized to broker diplomatic deals on the international scene.

== Composition and publication ==
Crippled America served as a promotional mechanism displaying Trump's conservative views during the 2016 U.S. presidential campaign. Prior to his work on Crippled America, Trump published two earlier political books, The America We Deserve (2000) and Time to Get Tough (2011): the former for Trump's brief 2000 presidential campaign platform and the latter for the 2012 presidential election he considered running in. The book demonstrated to Trump's opposition that he had legitimate political stances and sought to reassure Republicans that he was a staunch conservative.

While no co-author is formally credited, Trump was helped by prolific ghostwriter David Fisher. The New York Daily News quoted a witness to the collaboration who considered it a haphazard affair: "He (Donald) got this done on the road with a series of phone calls and snippets from campaign speeches." Fisher, discussing the book in 2021, said Trump showed no interest in the contents; instead, "what was most important to him, more than anything, was the pictures."

Trump said in 2015 about the book's gloomy title, that a cover photo shot inspired it: "there was one picture that was just mean. It was a horrible, horrible, mean picture. Like a nasty-looking guy. ... I said, 'We're going to call it, 'Crippled America.' Because that's what it is. It's 'Crippled America'." Conversely, according to the preface of the book, the title determined the choice of photo. In any event, over the course of numerous promotional appearances, Trump limited discussion of the book to its cover.

Crippled America was first published in 2015 in hardcover format by Simon & Schuster. An ebook format followed by an audiobook voiced by Jeremy Lowell were released the same year. During the 2016 presidential campaign, the book was reissued in trade paperback format under the title Great Again: How to Fix Our Crippled America with a new foreword and rosier cover portrait. The book is also published in Danish, French, German, Japanese, Korean, Polish, and Vietnamese.

== Sales and reception ==
To launch the work, Trump held a press conference and book signing at Trump Tower in New York City on November 3, 2015. He plugged the book on such disparate shows as Good Morning America, Fox & Friends, Live with Kelly & Michael, Hannity, Morning Joe, and Infowars; mentioned it at rallies throughout October and November; and tweeted about it 31 times. Reflecting back in June 2016, Trump said, "I didn't promote it, I didn't do anything, and it still did great."

Crippled America debuted at spot number 5 on the hardcover nonfiction section for The New York Times Best Seller list on November 12, 2015 –‌one placement behind Republican candidate Ben Carson's book A More Perfect Union: What We the People Can Do to Reclaim Our Constitutional Liberties. In total, Trump's book spent 13 weeks on the Times' bestseller list. According to Nielsen BookScan, Crippled America outsold all other books published by 2016 political candidates, selling out of stock in the paperback version and an additional 199,000 hardcover copies by March 2016. Trump reported the same year he received between $1 million and $5 million in income from total sales of the book. Trump falsely promised all proceeds would go to charity.

NPR wrote that Crippled America "doesn't exactly break new ground," and is comparable to other campaign-trail books which function "less [as] a literary work and more a political tool." Chris Townsend of King's Review described the book with a direct quote from the work: "there's very little that is subtle or sophisticated about this book." Townsend observed that the book, like Trump's earlier work The Art of the Deal (1987), portrays "Trump as the businessman who will get the best deal for America." He further assessed Crippled America as "first and foremost, a business book," translating the themes of his preceding books on a national scale. On the Issues's Jesse Gordon gave the book a favorable review, writing that Crippled America demonstrates to Trump's opposition his political stances; "Trump lays out specific policy choices," Gordon attests, "in his own inimitable style, with real specifics and real substance, and he elaborates on how he came to the conclusions he did."

Michiko Kakutani, a reporter for The New York Times, criticized the book for boasting about Trump's business ventures, while articulating a grim, dystopian view of the U.S. Kakutani adds "In many respects, Mr. Trump's own quotes and writings provide the most vivid and alarming picture of his values, modus operandi and relentlessly dark outlook focused on revenge." The Washington Times writer John R. Coyne highlighted Trump's blunt nature against "today's carefully choreographed campaign kabuki." Coyne points out the mutually beneficial relationship between Trump and the media, regarding the statements in Crippled America, that "They get reported and amplified. Mr. Trump benefits. And so does the media." Jeremy Diamond of CNN noted that, much like Trump's campaign speeches and rallies, the book is written in "Trump's trademark simple prose, peppered with tangents." Although the content is familiar to those who followed his campaign, Diamond explained, it does "shed some light on Trump, the man, and how he plans to frame the future as he presses his bid for the Republican nomination."

== See also ==
- Bibliography of Donald Trump
- Our Revolution (Sanders book), Bernie Sanders' memoir published in November 2016
- Stronger Together (book), Hillary Clinton's 2016 campaign book
