= Makers and Takers =

- Author: Peter Schweizer
- Subject: Liberalism, Conservatism
- Publisher: Doubleday
- Publication date: June 3, 2008
- Pages: 272
- ISBN: 978-0-385-51350-0
- Preceded by: Do as I Say (Not as I Do)
- Followed by: Clinton Cash

Makers and Takers is a book by Peter Schweizer. It was published by Doubleday in June 2008. The book's thesis is summarized in its subtitle: Why conservatives work harder, feel happier, have closer families, take fewer drugs, give more generously, value honesty more, are less materialistic and envious, whine less … and even hug their children more than liberals. Where Schweizer's book Do as I Say (Not as I Do): Profiles in Liberal Hypocrisy portrayed liberal icons and leaders in America as less virtuous than their conservative counterparts, Makers and Takers expands this thesis to the general populace, implying conservatives in general are more virtuous than liberals.
