= What Happened (Clinton book) =

2017 memoir by Hillary Clinton

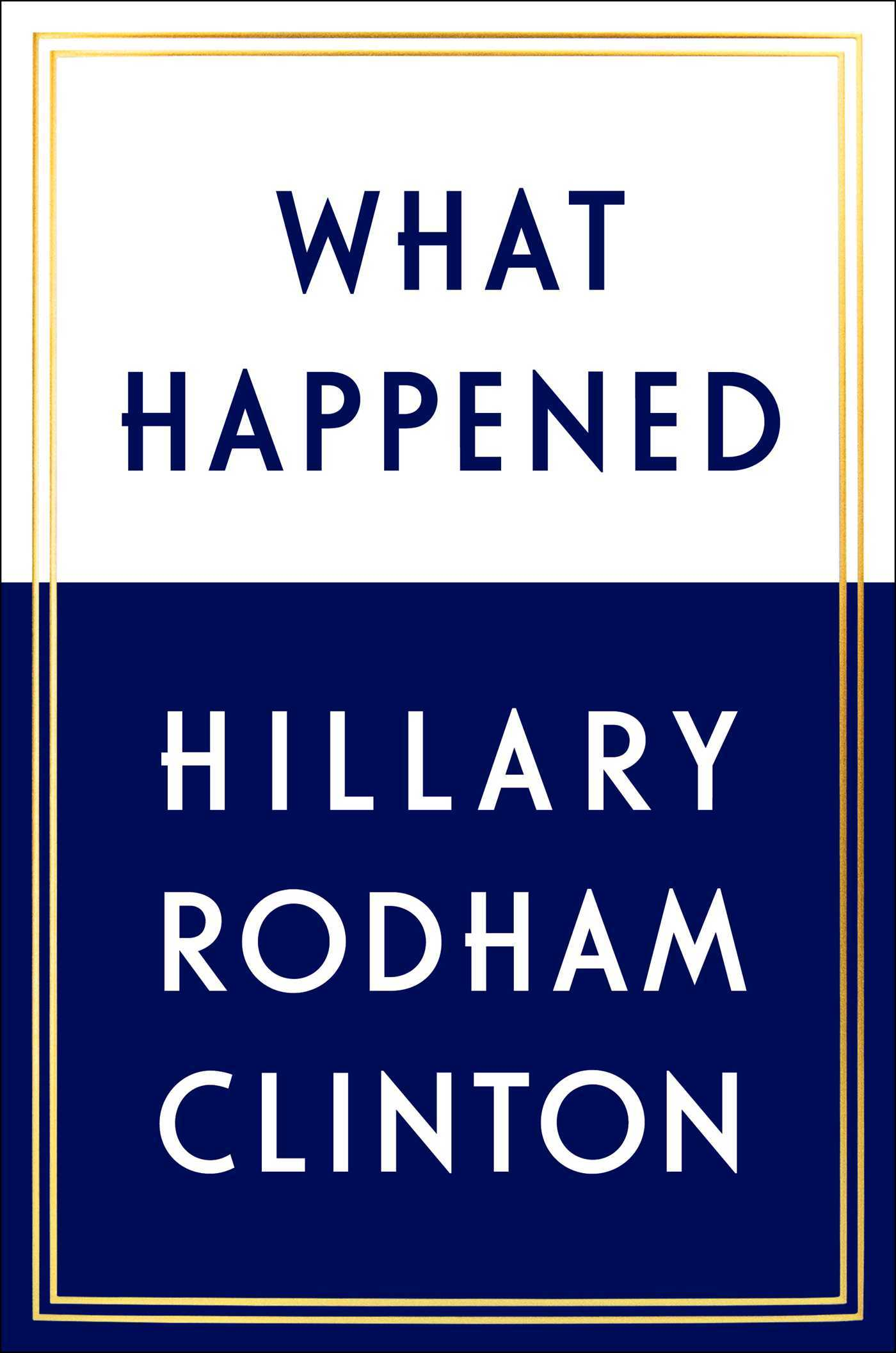
- First edition
- Author: Hillary Rodham Clinton
- Language: English
- Subject: 2016 United States presidential election
- Publisher: Simon & Schuster
- Publication date: September 12, 2017
- Publication place: United States
- Media type: Print
- Pages: 512
- ISBN: 978-1-5011-7556-5
- Preceded by: Stronger Together
- Followed by: The Book of Gutsy Women
- Website: www.simonandschuster.com/books/What-Happened/Hillary-Rodham-Clinton/9781501175565

What Happened is a 2017 memoir by Hillary Clinton about her experiences as the Democratic Party's nominee and general election candidate for president of the United States in the 2016 election. Published on September 12, 2017, it is her seventh book with her publisher, Simon & Schuster.

A paperback edition featuring a new afterword was released in September 2018, as was a Spanish translation titled Lo que pasó.

== Inception and advance publicity ==
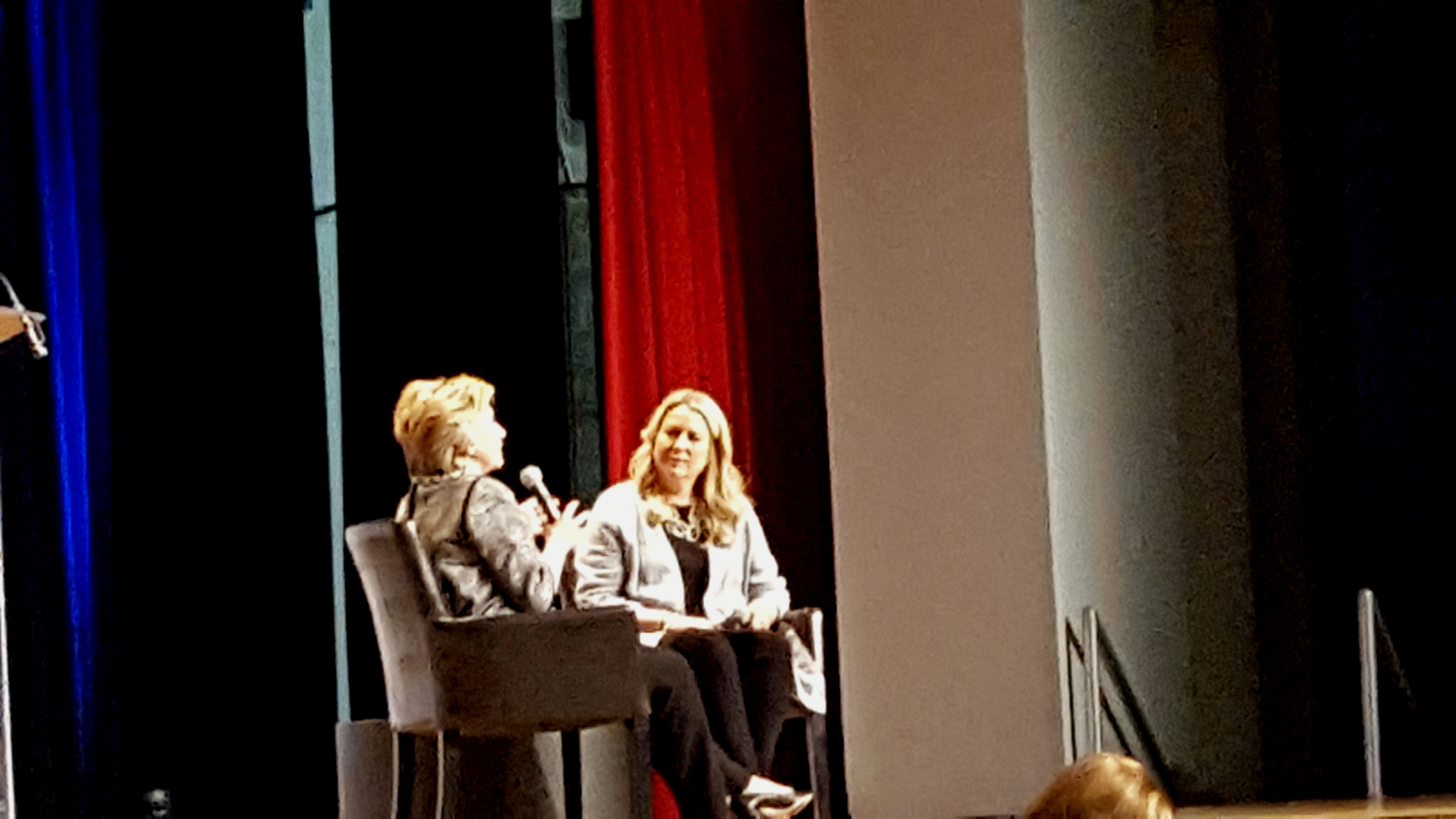
Clinton discussing the book with Cheryl Strayed at BookExpo America

Existence of a new Clinton work was first revealed in February 2017, but at the time it was billed as a volume of essays centered around the author's favorite sayings, with only some allusions to the campaign. Financial terms of that work, which had no announced title, were not publicly disclosed but industry observers expected her monetary compensation to be large. The new purposing of the work and its thematic substance were revealed in July 2017. After the title was announced, it was parodied with memes on Twitter.

The New York Times wrote that the stated aim of the book was to offer an intimate view of what it was like for Clinton to run as the first female presidential candidate from a major party in United States history, in an often vicious and turbulent campaign. This is her third memoir, following Living History in 2003 and Hard Choices in 2014; advance publicity for the work said it would be her "most personal" yet and quoted from her words in the book's Introduction: "In the past, for reasons I try to explain, I've often felt I had to be careful in public, like I was up on a wire without a net. Now I'm letting my guard down." Clinton promised a new level of candor as a major theme of the initial publicity surrounding the book. The work was also said to include some self-help ideas about how to get past highly unpleasant experiences.

== Contents ==
What Happened is a first-person account dedicated to "the team that stood with me in 2016," and one of its chapters is largely a list of everyone who worked on her campaign. It is organized into six main parts, titled: Perseverance, Competition, Sisterhood, Idealism and Realism, Frustration, and Resilience. Each part has from two to five chapters within it.

After the introduction, the book opens with a scene from the United States presidential inauguration of 2017, attended by Clinton and her husband, where she watched President Donald Trump take office. She begins:

Deep breath. Feel the air fill my lungs. This is the right thing to do. The country needs to see that our democracy still works, no matter how painful this is. Breathe out. Scream later.

In the next chapter, "Get Caught Trying," she starts with her reasoning for running:

I ran for President because I thought I'd be good at the job. I thought that of all the people who might run, I had the most relevant experience, meaningful accomplishments, and ambitious but achievable proposals, as well as the temperament to get things done in Washington.

Further in, she elaborates:

It was the chance to do the most good I would ever be able to do. In just one day at the White House, you can get more done for more people than in months anywhere else. We had to build an economy that worked for everyone. We had to take on serious national security threats. These issues were already on my mind all the time.... I knew I would make the most of every minute. Once I started thinking about it that way, I couldn't stop.

In the book, she defends her campaign, saying they were economical with travel expenses, snacks, and office supplies. "Our national campaign staff [were] living and working on a tight budget..." She revealed that the average donation was $100 and that the majority were from women.

She also describes campaigning in hostile areas of the country, like Mingo County, West Virginia, "Ground Zero for the coal crisis." She describes being taken aback by the level of anger she was met there with. She wrote, "This wasn't just about my comments in one town hall. This was something deeper."

In the book, also, Clinton tries to explain the combination of factors that led to her electoral loss, including James Comey, Vladimir Putin, Mitch McConnell, The New York Times, NBC, WikiLeaks, the American media as a whole, sexism, white resentment, Bernie Sanders and his supporters, Green Party candidate Jill Stein, and herself, specifically her comments on putting "coal miners out of business" and labeling some of her opponent's supporters as a "basket of deplorables".

She noted that President Obama worried that extending the handover process after Trump's win would be bad for the country. She wrote "After so much hand-wringing about Trump undermining our democracy by not pledging to accept the results, the pressure was on us to do it right. If I was going to lose, the President wanted me to concede quickly and gracefully. It was hard to think straight, but I agreed with him."

The book contains a number of Clinton's policy proposals, featuring her analysis of a problem area and her ideas for how to solve it like resolving the issues of climate change and securing the vote. It also says though she was ecstatic about Barack Obama's win in 2008, "in some ways, the [moment with Trump as president] now feels even more hopeful, because it is a battle-hardened hope, tempered by loss and clear-eyed about the stakes.... We are doing the work."

Another subject of the book is how to get through difficult experiences. Clinton discusses her practice of yoga and her liking of chardonnay, but in particular, she lists a large number of books that helped her cope with the loss in one way or another. These included mysteries by Louise Penny, Jacqueline Winspear, Donna Leon, and Caroline and Charles Todd. They also included the Neapolitan Novels of Elena Ferrante, the spiritual works of Henri Nouwen, and the collected poems of Maya Angelou, Marge Piercy and T. S. Eliot.

What Happened closes with a scene from a speech she gave at her alma mater Wellesley College. Clinton concludes it with the advice to readers to "Keep going."

== Sales ==
=== Domestic sales ===
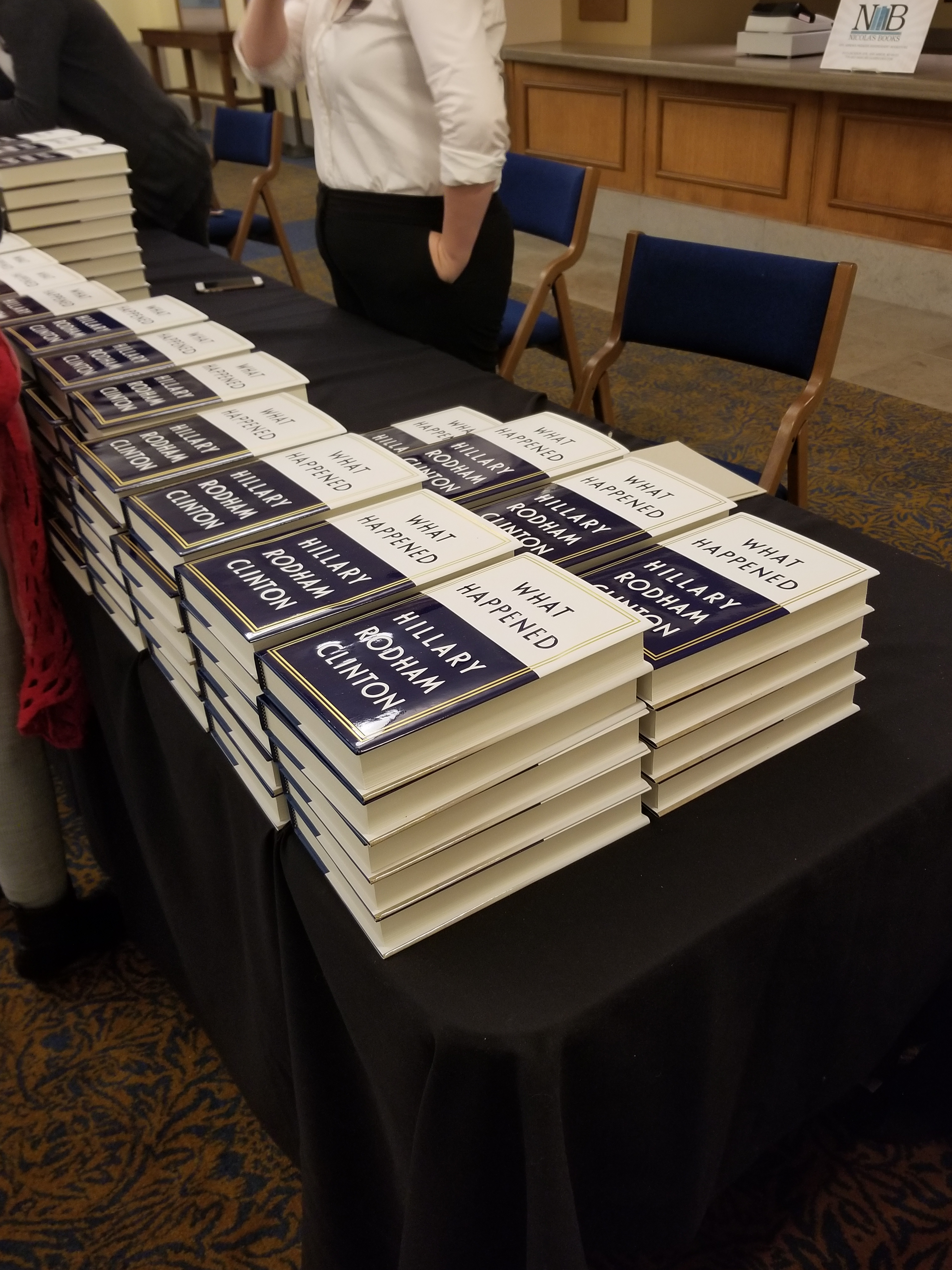
Copies of What Happened during Clinton's appearance at the Hill Auditorium in October 2017

The hardcover edition was published on September 12, 2017; it immediately went to the top of the Barnes & Noble, Amazon, and USA Today bestseller lists. The book debuted at number one on The New York Times Best Seller List for both hardcover nonfiction and combined print and e-book nonfiction sales, remaining atop the lists for it stayed for two weeks. It dropped to number two on both lists in its third week. By the beginning of November it had spent six weeks in the top four positions of the list. By the beginning of January 2018 the book had spent sixteen weeks on the list. The following week it fell off. The book debuted at number one of the Publishers Weekly "Top 10 overall" and "hardcover nonfiction" bestseller lists. In its third week on the lists, it dropped to number three of the "Top 10 overall" and to number two of the "hardcover nonfiction" lists with a total of 311,982 hardcover copies sold.

What Happened sold 300,000 copies in its first week. The first-week sales were lower than her 2003 memoir, Living History, but triple the first-week sales of Clinton's previous memoir, 2014's Hard Choices. The first-week hardcover sales for What Happened were 167,000. This marked the strongest hardcover debut for a nonfiction book since 2012's No Easy Day. Simon & Schuster also announced that What Happened sold more e-books in its first-week than any nonfiction book had since 2010. As of December 10, 2017, the book had sold 448,947 hardcover copies.

After its paperback, rerelease, the book debuted at #9 on The New York Times Best Sellers' "Paperback Nonfiction" list.

=== International sales ===
What Happened also performed strongly in its release outside of the United States. In the United Kingdom, What Happened debuted atop The Sunday Times bestseller list.

In Ireland, the book was able to peak atop the Nielsen BookScan component chart for hardcover non-fiction. On the primary Irish Nielsen BookScan chart tracking sales of both hardcover and paperback books in all genres, What Happened debuted at number ten (selling 767 copies). It jumped to number seven in its second week (selling 800 copies). It jumped further to number four in its third week (selling 1,117 copies). In its fourth week it dropped to number six (however with consistent sales, selling 1,116 copies). It exited the top-ten in its seventh week.

In Canada, What Happened debuted atop The Globe and Mail's hardcover non-fiction best sellers list. It remained on the chart for six consecutive weeks. In New Zealand, What Happened debuted number 8 on Nielsen BookScan's "International Non-fiction - Adults" chart. In Australia, the book charted on Books+Publishing's bestsellers chart.

== Critical reception ==
What Happened polarized book critics.

Jennifer Senior of The New York Times said:

What Happened is not one book, but many. It is a candid and blackly funny account of her mood in the direct aftermath of losing to President Donald J. Trump. It is a post-mortem, in which she is both coroner and corpse. It is a feminist manifesto. It is a score-settling jubilee. It is a rant against James B. Comey, Bernie Sanders, the media, James B. Comey, Vladimir Putin and James B. Comey. It is a primer on Russian spying. It is a thumping of Trump.

For Washington Post writer David Weigel noted that Clinton "apologizes to the reader, who has to relive all of this. 'It wasn't healthy or productive,' she writes, 'to dwell on the ways I felt I'd been shivved.' It's a perfect word, 'shivved.' The Hillary Clinton of this bitter memoir ... again and again ... blames herself for losing, apologizing for her 'dumb' email management, for giving paid speeches to banks, for saying she would put coal miners 'out of business.' She veers between regret and righteous, sometimes in the same paragraph."

A review in the Chicago Tribune by Heidi Stevens stated that the passages in the book about Russia's involvement in the US election "read like a spy novel". Thomas Frank in The Guardian contends that "Unfortunately, her new book is less an effort to explain than it is to explain away. ... Still, by exercising a little discernment, readers can find clues to the mystery of 2016 here and there among the clouds of blame-evasion and positive thinking."

An analysis by Ezra Klein, editor-in-chief of Vox, saw a different role for the book, making reference to Clinton's belief that progress is best made by working within the political system: "What Happened has been sold as Clinton's apologia for her 2016 campaign, and it is that. But it's more remarkable for Clinton's extended defense of a political style that has become unfashionable in both the Republican and Democratic parties."

David L. Ulin of the Los Angeles Times wrote in his review for the newspaper that the book is a "necessary—if at times clunky and unconvincing—retrospective" and that "She should have been president, and she knows it; regret and loss is palpable throughout the book. And yet it's also the case that she remains unable to reckon with just what happened in the 2016 election, looking for explanations, for reasons, while at the same time never quite uncovering her own complicity."

Sarah Jones of The New Republic wrote:

The real problem with What Happened is that it is not the book it needed to be. It spends more time on descriptions of Clinton's various post-election coping strategies, which include chardonnay and "alternative nostril breathing," than it does on her campaign decisions in the Midwest. It is written for her fans, in other words, and not for those who want real answers about her campaign, and who worry that the Democratic Party is learning the wrong lessons from the 2016 debacle.

Jeff Greenfield wrote in Politico Magazine that the book suggests "that the person we've seen over the past quarter-century, and the person we watched seek the presidency twice, is the authentic Hillary. In fact, to judge by her book, she may have been the most authentic person in the race."

A 2019 study in the journal Perspectives on Politics tried to evaluate the veracity of reasons that Clinton presented for her loss in the 2016 election. The study found that "more often than not, HRC’s assumptions are supported" but that there was little evidence that the e-mail scandal, including FBI Director James Comey’s intervention shortly before Election Day, contributed to her loss.

== Awards and honors ==
Time magazine listed What Happened as #1 on its list of the best non-fiction books of 2017. NPR's Book Concierge included What Happened on its list of "2017's Great Reads." What Happened also won the Goodreads Choice Award for Best Memoir & Autobiography.

== Book tour ==
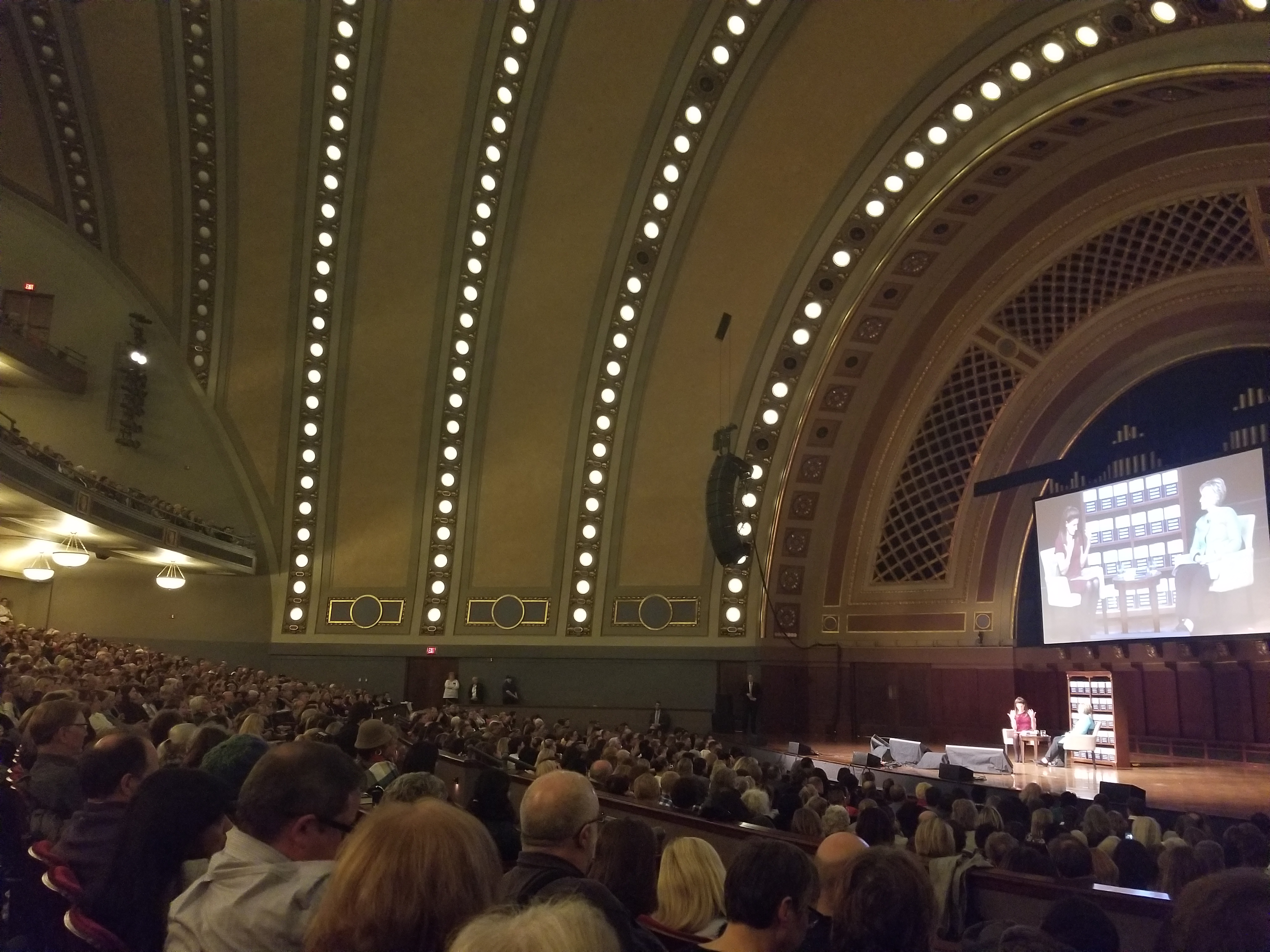
The Hill Auditorium during Hillary Clinton Live

It was announced on August 28, 2017, that Hillary Clinton would be starting a North American book tour in September 2017 to promote What Happened, as well as the picture book It Takes a Village (a new take on that 1996 volume).

Clinton scheduled more than thirty appearances in cities across the United States and Canada as part of an official book tour which lasted through December 2017. Clinton also traveled to the United Kingdom to promote the book. In part, the events in the U.K. were considered a great success, with tickets being sold out in less than an hour in some places. In May 2018, she took her book tour to New Zealand and Australia.

Clinton partook in a series of engagements titled Hillary Clinton Live. At many of her appearances, Clinton was met with audiences filling multi-thousand-seat venues. Starting prices for general admission tickets ranged from $30 to $125.

Tickets for particular signings sold out very soon after going on sale. For instance, tickets to Clinton's signing at Vroman's Bookstore in Pasadena sold out within ninety minutes. The president of Vroman's Bookstore reported that it was the fastest that the store had ever sold out for an event.

== See also ==
- Shattered: Inside Hillary Clinton's Doomed Campaign
