= Uranium One controversy =

Alleged US political scandal

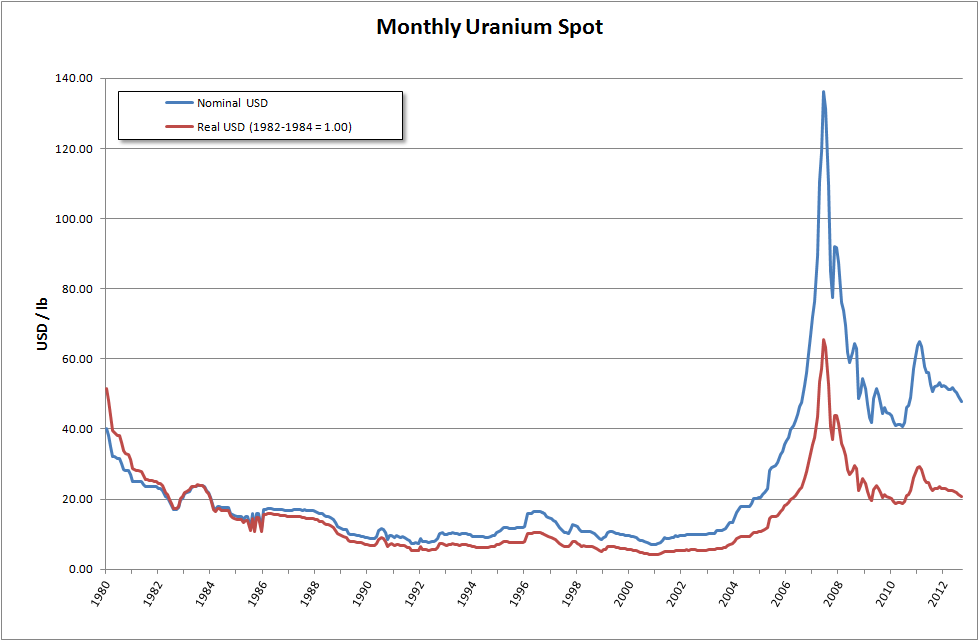
Monthly uranium spot price

The Uranium One controversy involves various conspiracy theories promoted by conservative media, politicians, and commentators that characterized the sale of the uranium mining company Uranium One to the Russian state-owned corporation Rosatom as a $145 million bribery scandal involving Hillary Clinton and the Clinton Foundation. No evidence of wrongdoing was ever found.

Since the 2015 publication of the book Clinton Cash by Breitbart News editor and Steve Bannon collaborator Peter Schweizer, as well as a 2015 New York Times article that used some of Schweizer's raw research, allegations of a bribery scheme involving Hillary Clinton, the Clinton Foundation and the 2010 sale of Uranium One persisted, primarily in conservative media. Fox News host Sean Hannity characterized it as "the biggest scandal – or, at least, one of them – in American history," while his frequent guest and former Trump advisor Seb Gorka equated it with treason worthy of a death sentence.

Despite four years of discussion and analysis of the matter – as well as an FBI investigation – no evidence of any wrongdoing surfaced. Numerous Republican politicians and pundits, including President Donald Trump, insisted that the Clinton-Uranium One story was the "real" Russian scandal, rather than the matters for which the Trump administration was investigated. The Washington Post reported in January 2020 that an additional Justice Department investigation into the matter, initiated after Donald Trump took office in 2017, was winding down after finding nothing worth pursuing.

== Timeline of events ==
=== 2005: $145 million alleged bribes to Clinton Foundation ===
Frank Giustra donated $31.3 million to the Clinton Foundation, to be followed in 2007 with a pledge of at least $100 million. These amounts constituted the bulk of the $145 million in supposed bribes paid to the Clinton Foundation.

=== 2007: Uranium One acquired UrAsia Energy ===
On April 20, 2007, Uranium One, a Canadian mining company with headquarters in Toronto, acquired UrAsia Energy, a Canadian firm with headquarters in Vancouver, from Frank Giustra, who then resigned from the UrAsia Energy Board of Directors.

Having severed ties with UrAsia Energy and Uranium One in 2007, Giustra had no evident beneficial interest in the subsequent sale of Uranium One to Rosatom in 2010, as he sold the 2,790,000 Uranium One shares he received in exchange for his shares of UrAsia in 2007. (Per the deal terms, UrAsia shareholders received 0.45 shares of Uranium One for each share of UrAsia they held.)

UrAsia has interests in rich uranium operations in Kazakhstan, and UrAsia Energy's acquisition of its Kazakhstan uranium interests from Kazatomprom followed a trip to Almaty in 2005 by Giustra and former U.S. President Bill Clinton where they met with Nursultan Nazarbayev, the leader of Kazakhstan. Giustra denies reporting by The New York Times that he and Clinton traveled together to Almaty. Substantial contributions to the Clinton Foundation by Giustra followed, with Clinton, Giustra, and Mexican telecommunications billionaire Carlos Slim in 2007, establishing the Clinton Foundation's Clinton Giustra Sustainable Growth Initiative to combat poverty in the developing world. In addition to his initial pledge of $100 million, Giustra pledged to contribute half of his future earnings from mining to the initiative. There is no indication that Giustra was contemplating any transaction with Russian interests at the time he began donating to the Clinton Foundation in 2005; rather, he sold UrAsia Energy to Uranium One, a South African-Canadian company based in Toronto, in 2007. That sale was completed two months before he made his pledges to the Clinton Foundation.

Since uranium is considered a strategic asset with national security implications and Uranium One owned uranium mining operations in the United States, the acquisition of Uranium One by Rosatom was reviewed by the Committee on Foreign Investment in the United States (CFIUS), a committee of nine government cabinet departments and agencies including the United States Department of State, which was then headed by Hillary Clinton. Clinton herself did not sit on CFIUS, but rather the State Department was represented by Jose Fernandez, the Assistant Secretary of State for Economic, Energy and Business Affairs, who stated that Clinton was not involved in the Uranium One matter. Although CFIUS members can object to such a foreign transaction, none did, and no member can veto a decision; veto power rests solely with the president. CFIUS unanimously approved the Uranium One sale. The Utah Division of Radiation Control and Canada's foreign investment review agency also approved the transaction.

=== 2010: $500,000 payment to Bill Clinton ===
On June 29, 2010, Renaissance Capital, a Russian investment bank with ties to the Kremlin and which was promoting Uranium One stock, paid Bill Clinton $500,000 for a speech in Moscow shortly after the Rosatom acquisition of Uranium One was announced.

=== 2015: New York Times coverage ===
On April 23, 2015, The New York Times reported that during the acquisition, the family foundation of Uranium One's chairman, Ian Telfer, made $2.35 million in donations to the Clinton Foundation. The donations were legal but not publicly disclosed by the Clinton Foundation, despite an agreement with the White House to disclose all contributors. In a follow-up story six days later, The Times clarified that the donations went to "the Clinton Giustra Enterprise Partnership (Canada), [which] operates in parallel to a Clinton Foundation project called the Clinton Giustra Enterprise Partnership, which is expressly covered by an agreement Mrs. Clinton signed to make all donors public while she led the State Department. However, the foundation maintains that the Canadian partnership is not bound by that agreement and that under Canadian law contributors' names cannot be made public."

In his May 5, 2015, book Clinton Cash, Breitbart News editor Peter Schweizer alleged that the Clinton Foundation received $145 million in pledges and donations in exchange for Hillary Clinton's support of the Uranium One deal. This allegation has been repeated numerous times across conservative media, particularly by Sean Hannity, as evidence of a bribery scheme. However, $31 million of this amount was donated by Frank Giustra in 2005, and another $100 million pledged by him in 2007, the latter amount after he had severed ties with Uranium One. Both cases occurred years before any prospective Uranium One sale to Russian interests was known. PolitiFact identified about $4 million in donations from various Uranium One investors in the years before and after the Russian deal.

=== 2016: FBI investigate Clinton Foundation ===
By August 2016, the FBI had begun to confidentially investigate the Clinton Foundation, based largely on Schweizer's book and reporting by The New York Times, but they failed to find much evidence to support corruption allegations. As the investigation lay dormant, Attorney General Jeff Sessions in December 2017 ordered Justice Department prosecutors to ask FBI investigators about the evidence they had gathered. Sessions was responding to demands of Republican members of Congress for a special counsel to be appointed to investigate Uranium One and other matters relating to Hillary Clinton and the FBI. CNN reported on March 29, 2018, that Sessions had appointed John W. Huber, the United States Attorney for the District of Utah, to investigate "a cluster of Republican-driven accusations against the FBI," which includes allegations that the FBI acted inappropriately in two matters involving Hillary Clinton, including her emails and the sale of Uranium One to Rosatom. In a letter to three Republican Congressional committee chairmen, Sessions said he would rely on Huber's findings to decide if a special counsel needed to be appointed. Huber had been investigating the matters for a time, but his involvement had not previously been disclosed.

Several members of Clinton's State Department staff and officials from the Obama-era Department of Justice have said that CFIUS reviews are handled by civil servants and that it would be unlikely that Clinton would have had more than nominal involvement in her department's signing off on the acquisition. According to Snopes, the timing of donations might have been questionable if Hillary Clinton had played a key role in approving the deal, but all evidence suggests that she did not and may in fact have had no role in approving the deal at all.

=== 2017 ===
==== Investigation on the sale of Uranium One ====
In October 2017, following a report by John F. Solomon and Alison Spann published in The Hill and citing anonymous sources, the Republican-controlled House Intelligence Committee opened an investigation into the circumstances surrounding the sale of Uranium One. The Hill story insinuated payments from Russians to the Clinton Foundation at the time when the Obama administration approved the sale of Uranium One to Rosatom. The story also focused on the alleged failures of the Department of Justice to investigate and report on the controversy, suggesting a cover-up. Subsequently, the story "took off like wildfire in the right-wing media ecosystem," according to a 2018 study by scholars at the Berkman Klein Center for Internet & Society, Harvard University. The Hill reported, "There is no evidence in any of the public records that the FBI believed that the Clintons or anyone close to them did anything illegal. But there's definitive evidence the Russians were seeking their influence with a specific eye on the State Department."

FactCheck.org reported that there was "no evidence" connecting the Uranium One–Rosatom merger deal with a money laundering and bribery case involving a different Rosatom subsidiary which resulted in the conviction of a Russian individual in 2015, contrary to what is implied in the Solomon-Spann story. Glenn Kessler of The Washington Post wrote that the problem with some of the accusations that Republican commentators levied against Clinton is that she "by all accounts, did not participate in any discussions regarding the Uranium One sale." The Treasury Department and the CFIUS approved the investment without any participation by Clinton.

==== Lift gag order ====
In October 2017, President Trump directed the U.S. Department of Justice (DOJ) to lift a gag order it had placed on a former FBI informant involved in the investigation. The DOJ released the informant from his nondisclosure agreement on October 25, 2017, authorizing him to provide the leaders of the Senate Judiciary Committee, House Oversight Committee, and the House Permanent Select Committee on Intelligence "any information or documents he has concerning alleged corruption or bribery involving transactions in the uranium market" involving Rosatom, its subsidiaries Tenex and Uranium One, and the Clinton Foundation. The informant's lawyer said that the informant "can tell what all the Russians were talking about during the time that all these bribery payments were made." During a C-SPAN interview, Hillary Clinton said that any allegations that she was bribed to approve the Uranium One deal were "baloney." On November 16, 2017, William Douglas Campbell identified himself as the FBI informant. He is a former lobbyist for Tenex, the US-based arm of Russia's Rosatom. On March 8, 2018, The Hill reported, "A confidential informant [Campbell] billed by House Republicans as having "explosive" information about the 2010 Uranium One deal approved during Hillary Clinton's tenure as secretary of State provided "no evidence of a quid pro quo" involving Clinton, Democratic staff said in a summary of the informant's closed-door testimony obtained by The Hill on Thursday." CNN reported that the summary document also stated that the Justice Department had expressed concerns about Campbell's credibility due to "inconsistencies between Campbell's statements and documents" in a separate investigation in 2015.

In November 2017, Shepard Smith of Fox News described President Trump's accusations against Clinton regarding Uranium One "inaccurate in a number of ways." Smith said that the sale of Uranium One was "not a Hillary Clinton approval" but instead a unanimous decision by the nine cabinet-level department heads of CFIUS, approved by the president and with permits issued by the Nuclear Regulatory Commission. Smith added that "most of the Clinton Foundation donations" came from Frank Giustra, who said he "sold his stake in the company" three years before it was sold to Russia. Lastly, Smith noted that "none of the uranium was exported for use by the U.S. to Russia."

==== Review of FBI investigation ordered by Attorney General Sessions ====
In March 2018, Attorney General Jeff Sessions revealed that he had declined to appoint a special counsel to investigate, among other matters, the alleged connections between Uranium One and the Clinton Foundation and, instead, had ordered John W. Huber, U.S. Attorney for the District of Utah, on November 22, 2017, to look into whether further investigation was warranted. Huber found nothing worth investigating, a result law enforcement officials indicated was largely expected, and the investigation was quietly wound down.

Nonprofit American Oversight obtained Session's letter in 2019 through a Freedom of Information Act (FOIA) request they had filed in 2017; the United States Department of Justice had claimed in 2018 that the letter did not exist.

=== 2018: Indictment rumor ===
In 2018, several sources, including the New York Post, incorrectly reported an indictment in the Tenex/Rosatam kickback scheme as a "first indictment" resulting from Rosatom's purchase of Uranium One. The rumor was rated false by PolitiFact and Snopes.
