= Our Revolution (Sanders book) =

2016 book by Bernie Sanders

Our Revolution: A Future to Believe In
- First edition cover
- Author: Bernie Sanders
- Audio read by: Bernie Sanders; Mark Ruffalo
- Language: English
- Subjects: 2016 presidential election; climate change; free education; income inequality; gender pay gap
- Publisher: Thomas Dunne Books; St. Martin's Press
- Publication date: November 15, 2016
- Publication place: United States
- Media type: Print (hardcover and paperback), e-book, audiobook
- Pages: 464
- ISBN: 978-1-250-13292-5 (hardcover)
- OCLC: 1026148801
- Dewey Decimal: 973.932092 B
- LC Class: E840.8.S26 A3 2016
- Preceded by: The Speech: A Historic Filibuster on Corporate Greed and the Decline of Our Middle Class
- Followed by: Bernie Sanders Guide to Political Revolution

Our Revolution: A Future to Believe In is a book by U.S. Senator from Vermont Bernie Sanders, published by Thomas Dunne Books in November 2016.

It was released on November 15, 2016, a week after the election of Donald Trump. The book was written in the context of Sanders's 2016 presidential campaign and aimed to explain some of its rationale.

== Contents ==
In the book, Sanders sets out his position on climate change, free college tuition, income inequality, closing the gender wage gap and defeating Donald Trump while campaigning for Hillary Clinton during the last three months leading to the 2016 presidential election.

== Reception ==
Upon its release, it was on The New York Times Best Seller list at number 3.

John R. Coyne Jr. gave the memoir a positive review for The Washington Times saying that "For starters, it tells us who this man who energized so many young people really is—an enthusiastic young socialist trapped in an old curmudgeon's body, his ideas basically just as fresh to him today as when he left his native Brooklyn".

David Weigel of The Denver Post said that the memoir was "like a sitcom character who gets beaned on the head and hallucinates an angel—or a talking dog, or a 75-year-old senator from Vermont—spinning lessons about what really matters in life".

Sanders and Mark Ruffalo were nominated for the Grammy Award for Best Spoken Word Album.

== See also ==
- Stronger Together, Hillary Clinton's 2016 campaign book
- Crippled America, Donald Trump's 2016 campaign book published in 2015
- Our Revolution, a PAC set up to support Sanders's policies and campaign for progressive candidates
