= Stronger Together (book) =

Book by Hillary Clinton and Tim Kaine

- Authors: Hillary Clinton; Tim Kaine
- Language: English
- Genre: Non-Fiction
- Publisher: Simon & Schuster
- Publication date: September 6, 2016
- Publication place: United States
- Media type: Trade paperback
- Pages: 288
- ISBN: 9781501161735
- Preceded by: Hard Choices
- Followed by: What Happened
- Website: www.simonandschuster.com/books/Stronger-Together/Hillary-Rodham-Clinton/9781501161735

Stronger Together: A Blueprint for America's Future is a non-fiction book by politicians Hillary Clinton and Tim Kaine, first published in paperback by Simon & Schuster in 2016. Stronger Together outlined Clinton and Kaine's political agenda as they ran in the 2016 election for president and vice president, respectively, on a liberal platform.

== Content ==
The contents of the book include summary-style policy points, photographs of the two authors campaigning, various charts, and excerpts from some of the speeches that Clinton has delivered. The book's presentation style is similar to that of a PowerPoint presentation.

The book is broken into three main sections:

1. Growing Together – proposals for the economy
2. Safer Together – proposals regarding national security
3. Standing Together – proposals and beliefs regarding domestic life and policy.

Both authors wrote brief introductions that detailed how some of their early upbringing has affected their current worldview. Each author also wrote a conclusion regarding personal reflections about the efforts they would make if elected.

== Publication ==
The work is of the "campaign book" genre. As The New York Times described it, "Candidates often release hurriedly-written books during their campaigns, often aimed at spreading their message and attracting publicity, rather than topping the best-seller charts."

Announcement of the book was first made on August 4, 2016. The publisher, Simon & Schuster, had put out all five of Clinton's previous books. In part, publication of the book was intended to highlight what the authors saw as the policy richness of Clinton's 2016 campaign, and the Clinton-Kaine team's readiness to assume office, in contrast to Donald Trump's 2016 campaign, which was seen by writers for CNN and The Washington Post as comparatively "policy-light".

Upon its release, which with its September 6 publication date came later in the election cycle than usual for books of this ilk, Clinton told reporters that the book was intended to be "our blueprint for America's future. We wanted voters to be able to find, in one easy place, all of the various plans and policies that I've been talking about throughout this campaign." Kaine emphasized that the book had a positive message about the country's future, unlike what he said was the pessimistic vision put forth by Donald Trump's 2015 book Crippled America. The campaign chose the slogan and title "Stronger Together" from 85 possibilities; it was used on the campaign aircraft, campaign bus, and in a series of policy speeches.

== Critical reaction ==
Amazon.com user reviews of the book became an immediate battleground between Clinton opponents and sympathizers, with Amazon staff removing large numbers of negative reviews that were judged the work of Internet trolls.

Critical reaction to the book has been largely negative. Carlos Lozada, the nonfiction book critic for The Washington Post, wrote: "By the time I finished this book, I resented its existence. [... It] is a self-confessed cut-and-paste job of campaign fact sheets, speeches and op-eds. That sets rather modest expectations. Yet, even by that standard, and the low bar for candidates' campaign books overall, Stronger Together is an embarrassment, sloppy, repetitive, dutiful and boring." The review ended with a plea against the "campaign book genre" as a whole.

Alex Shephard, a news editor at The New Republic, wrote that: "It is a very bad book and there is absolutely no reason for it to exist. Sixteen dollars for a glorified platform is preposterous when you can get all of the information in the book—most of which means next to nothing—for free online. It begins vacuously (its first two sentences are: 'It has been said that America is great because America is good. We agree.') and doesn't get better from there."

Anna Silman, a writer on culture for New York magazine, said that the book can be characterized by "its Serif-heavy font, kitschy imagery, and [...] absence of good taste". A headline in The Christian Science Monitor read, "Are all campaign books awful? Clinton's certainly doesn't buck the trend".

Politics reporter Evan Halper of the Los Angeles Times was less caustic, saying of the volume, "the minutiae is the point. The political aim of the book is less to be a gripping page turner than to make the case that Donald Trump doesn't even have the material to publish such a book if he were so inclined."

Writing for CNN, senior producer Edward Mejia Davis compared the book to a similar effort by Bill Clinton and Al Gore, Putting People First: How We Can All Change America, put out during their 1992 campaign. Davis concluded that the comparison revealed a leftward drift in the Democratic Party during the intervening 24 years.

== Sales ==
Although both Clinton and Kaine promoted the new work in their campaign rallies, the book's initial sales were quite modest, selling fewer than 3,000 copies in its first week of availability. The New York Times said the figure "firmly makes the book what the publishing industry would consider a flop."

Any proceeds from the book were slated to go to charity.

== See also ==
- Crippled America, Donald Trump's campaign book published in 2015
- Our Revolution (Sanders book), Bernie Sanders' memoir published in November 2016
