= Clinton Foundation–State Department controversy =

US political controversy

During Hillary Clinton's tenure as Secretary of State, a number of individuals, organizations, and countries allegedly contributed to the Clinton Foundation either before, or while, pursuing interests through ordinary channels with the U.S. State Department.

Judicial Watch, a plaintiff in ongoing lawsuits pertaining to Clinton, alleged that email communications, obtained via FOIA requests, between officials at the Clinton Foundation and top aides of Secretary of State Clinton show improper ties between the Clinton Foundation and the State Department. Clinton denied these allegations.

Beginning in 2015, multiple investigations were conducted into alleged wrongdoing by the Foundation, including a two-year inquiry initiated by the Trump Justice Department, but through 2019 no evidence of wrongdoing was found.

== Background ==
=== Foundation ===
The Clinton Foundation, founded in 1997 by former US President Bill Clinton is a 501(c)(3) nonprofit organization that describes its mission as to "strengthen the capacity of people in the United States and throughout the world to meet the challenges of global interdependence."

Charity watchdog group Charity Navigator, which has an ongoing relationship with the Foundation, gave it its highest possible rating, four out of four stars, after its customary review of the Foundation's financial records and tax statements.

=== Confirmation hearings ===
In January 2009, when then Senator and former First Lady Hillary Clinton appeared before the Senate Foreign Relations Committee as a nominee for Secretary of State for the Obama administration, Senator Richard Lugar (the senior Republican on the committee) said that the Foundation was "a unique complication that would have to be managed with great care and transparency."

Lugar said that the foundation could create the impression that foreign donors were giving money to gain access at the State Department: "The core of the problem is that foreign governments and entities may perceive the Clinton Foundation as a means to gain favor with the Secretary of State".

Before her confirmation as Secretary of State, Clinton approved a memorandum of understanding (MOU) between the Foundation and the administration. The agreement permitted donations from governments who had contributed to the Foundation in the past, but prohibited contributions from governments that had not previously donated unless they were approved by the State Department's ethics office. The memorandum was intended to ensure that foreign governments would not view contributions to the Foundation as a means to curry favor with the US State Department. The MOU promised that the foundation would publish all contributors' names, and would seek prior approval from the State Department ethics office for new foreign donors.

== Operation of Foundation ==
=== Access to Clinton ===
A top donor to the foundation, Raj Fernando, was placed on the International Security Advisory Board within the State Department. A piece in the Atlantic, referring to an ABC News story, described Fernando as being "significantly less qualified" than other members of that Board. The request for his appointment came from Secretary Clinton's office, and Fernando resigned shortly after ABC News made inquiries about it.

Dennis Cheng had served as the chief development officer of the Clinton Foundation from 2011 to 2015, when he became the national finance director of Hillary Clinton's 2016 presidential campaign.

=== Donations by foreign entities ===
In February 2015, The Washington Post reported that during Clinton's tenure as Secretary of State, the Clinton Foundation accepted several million dollars in donations from seven foreign governments, in compliance with the MOU it had signed with the State Department. One donation of $500,000 from Algeria to the Clinton Foundation's Haiti relief fund was found to have not been vetted by the State Department, in violation of Clinton's agreement with the administration. The Post noted that the donation "coincided with a spike" in lobbying efforts by Algeria of the State Department regarding their human rights record.

=== Uranium One ===
From 2009 to 2013, the Russian atomic energy agency (Rosatom) acquired Uranium One, a Canadian company with global uranium mining stakes including 20% of the uranium production capacity in the United States. Since uranium is considered a strategic asset with national security implications, the acquisition was analyzed by a committee of nine government agencies, including the State Department, which was then headed by Clinton. The voting members of the committee can object to such a foreign transaction, with the final decision resting with the President.

In April 2015, The New York Times reported that, during the acquisition, the family foundation of Uranium One's chairman made $2.35 million in donations to the Clinton Foundation. The donations, which were legal, were not publicly disclosed by the Clintons, despite a prior agreement to do so. In addition, a Russian investment bank with ties to the Kremlin, and which was promoting Uranium One stock, paid Bill Clinton $500,000 for a speech in Moscow shortly after the acquisition was announced.

Numerous Republican figures, including President Trump, have accused Hillary Clinton of wrongdoing related to Uranium One. Trump said, "Hillary Clinton gave them 20 percent of our uranium, gave Russia, for a big payment." According to the Los Angeles Times, "independent analysts said the facts did not support Trump's assertion of scandal." FactCheck.org reported that there was "no evidence" connecting the bribery allegations investigated by the Select Committee with the Uranium One–Rosatom merger deal. In October 2017, the Washington Post fact-checker said that the fatal flaw in the accusations levied against Clinton is that she "by all accounts, did not participate in any discussions regarding the Uranium One sale which — as we noted — does not actually result in the removal of uranium from the United States." PBS mirrored the assessments by FactCheck.org and The Washington Post, noting that no uranium left the country, there is nothing to indicate Clinton was personally involved in the Uranium One sale, and that the State Department was one out of nine agencies that had to unanimously approve the Uranium One sale. In 2015, the spokesman for the US Nuclear Regulatory Commission said that "no Uranium One, Inc.-produced uranium has been shipped directly to Russia and the U.S. Government has not authorized any country to re-transfer U.S. uranium to Russia"; in 2017, the spokesman said that the statement was still true. This claim contradicts statements made by the US Nuclear Regulatory Commission spokesman in 2015 who confirmed yellowcake had been shipped to Canada, and a spokeswoman for Uranium One who said "25 percent had gone to Western Europe and Japan."

On October 25, 2017, the FBI removed the "gag order" on their informant related to the Uranium One deal controversy. As the informant lawyer, Victoria Toensing, stated that the informant "work uncovering the Russian nuclear bribery case and the efforts he witnessed by Moscow to gain influence with the Clintons in hopes of winning favorable uranium decisions from the Obama administration". During a C-SPAN interview, Clinton denied being bribed to approve the deal, and that all such allegations had been "debunked repeatedly". During an interview on Lou Dobbs Tonight, Toensing was ask about what she may have learned from the informant, she claimed that "It's quite significant", the informant "can tell what all the Russians were talking about during the time that all these bribery payments were made".

On November 16, 2017, during an exclusive interview with Reuters, the FBI secret informant, William Douglas Campbell, a former lobbyist for Tenex, the US-based arm of Rosatom, decided to speak out publicly for the first time. On March 8, 2018 The Hill reported, "A confidential informant [Campbell] billed by House Republicans as having "explosive" information about the 2010 Uranium One deal approved during Hillary Clinton's tenure as secretary of State provided "no evidence of a quid pro quo" involving Clinton, Democratic staff said in a summary of the informant's closed-door testimony obtained by The Hill on Thursday." CNN reported that the summary document also stated that the Justice Department had expressed concerns about Campbell's credibility due to "inconsistencies between Campbell's statements and documents" in an investigation into Tenex in 2015.

=== Switzerland's largest bank ===
When Clinton took office as Secretary of State, the Internal Revenue Service was suing Switzerland's largest bank, UBS AG, to obtain information on Americans with secret accounts at the bank. The bank's situation was complicated by the fact that, by acceding to the IRS's requests, the bank would potentially violate Switzerland's secrecy laws. Following what The Wall Street Journal referred to as "an unusual intervention by the top U.S. diplomat", Clinton announced a tentative settlement between UBS and the IRS. Based on the terms of the settlement, UBS provided information on the identities of 4,450 Americans with accounts at the bank out of a total of 52,000 requested by the IRS. The agreement was criticized by some lawmakers in the U.S. who had been seeking additional information.

Following the settlement in 2009, UBS's donations to the Clinton Foundation increased significantly. Through 2008, the bank had donated $60,000 cumulatively to the Foundation. By 2014, the total had grown to $600,000. The bank also paid Bill Clinton $1.5 million for a series of question-and-answer sessions with its CEO, which was the top source of corporate speech income for Clinton between 2001 and 2014.

=== Emails between Clinton Foundation and State Department ===
A number of emails released by Judicial Watch in August 2016 from Clinton's tenure as Secretary of State included dialogue between Doug Band, an official at the Clinton Foundation and personal aide to Bill Clinton, and top aides of Hillary Clinton. In one exchange in April 2009, Band lobbied for a job at the State Department on behalf of someone else saying it was "important to take care of (redacted)." Clinton's aide, Huma Abedin, responded "Personnel has been sending him options".

In June 2009, Band emailed Abedin requesting a meeting with Clinton for Crown Prince Salman of Bahrain, the heir apparent and First Deputy Prime Minister. Band referred to the Prince as "a good friend of ours." In 2005, the Prince had committed to contribute $32 million to scholarships through the Clinton Global Initiative. Abedin responded, offering the Prince a meeting, noting "We have reached out thru official channels."

In December 2010, Band and Abedin exchanged emails regarding efforts to obtain invitations to an official lunch with Chinese President Hu Jintao for Clinton Foundation donors. The potential guests who were discussed included Bob McCann, then-president of wealth management at UBS, Judith Rodin, Rockefeller Foundation president, and Hikmet Ersek, Western Union CEO. Band requested that Rodin be seated at the same table as Vice President Joe Biden.

According to CNN, the emails "raise questions about the Clinton Foundation's influence on the State Department and its relations during her tenure". The Clinton campaign denied that the State Department took any actions based on contributions to the Clinton Foundation.

== Controversy ==
The Clinton Foundation has been praised as a force for good and condemned as a "slush fund". The fact-checking organization Politifact says it is mostly true that the Clintons do not take from the foundation any salary, any other money, nor benefit personally. Supporters of the Clintons say that the controversy obscures valuable work done by the foundation, while others assert that the foundation made it possible for donors to gain access to Secretary Clinton, and influence her official actions.

=== Associated Press story ===
In 2016, the Associated Press published a controversial story based on logs of meetings Clinton took as Secretary of State. In the story, the AP stated that at least 85 of 154 people from private interests that Clinton met or had phone conversations with while Secretary of State donated to the Clinton Foundation. In total, the 85 donors contributed as much as $156 million to the Foundation. The AP described the number as an "extraordinary proportion indicating her possible ethics challenges if elected president". The AP promoted its story with a tweet claiming that "more than half those who met Clinton as Cabinet secretary gave money to Clinton Foundation", which has been criticized because it does not make clear that the analysis was performed on meetings with people who were not federal employees or foreign government representatives among other reasons.

By excluding Clinton's meetings with government officials from the U.S. and other countries, the majority of her diplomatic work, the AP's count included only a small subcategory of fewer than 5% of the people Clinton met with as secretary of state. The AP, explaining the omission, said that "such meetings would presumably have been part of her diplomatic duties". Further, among the private donors with whom Clinton met were internationally known individuals such as Melinda Gates, Elie Wiesel, and Muhammad Yunus.

Reporters from other news outlets immediately noticed, and commented on, the AP's selective use of information and misleading tweet. The report was called a "big failure" in an opinion piece by Paul Reyes of CNN, because it presented "facts out of context and somehow built a whole report around Clinton having done nothing wrong". A piece in the Washington Monthly stated that AP "took some interesting information they gathered and spun it into something it wasn't...scandalous." Others described the story as botched or "seriously flawed". Matthew Yglesias wrote that the AP story's conclusions "turned out not to be true". A Clinton spokesman said of the story, "It cherry-picked a limited subset of Secretary Clinton's schedule to give a distorted portrayal of how often she crossed paths with individuals connected to charitable donations to the Clinton Foundation." Despite criticism from other journalists, and calls from Clinton and others for the AP to retract its tweet, the AP defended its story, "although its Executive Editor did admit that its tweet had been "sloppy".

=== Transparency and foreign donations ===
Despite the MOU between the Clinton Foundation and the Obama Administration, the foundation's Clinton Health Access Initiative (CHAI) failed to report donors from 2009 to 2013, though later sought to rectify that omission. A CHAI spokeswoman blamed this omission on oversight.

According to PolitiFact, the Clinton Foundation was allowed to accept millions of dollars from Australia, Dominican Republic, Kuwait, Norway, Qatar and Oman because of the clause in the MOU which allows previous donors to continue to fund the foundation's programs. Conservative columnist Jennifer Rubin opined that the Qatari donation raised ethical questions because Qatar is "a prominent backer of Hamas." Without notifying the State Department, the Clinton Foundation accepted donations from Algeria, which donated for the first time in 2010, and from the United Kingdom, which tripled its support of the foundation's health programs between 2009 and 2012. Foundation officials blamed the case of Algeria on a lack of oversight and argued that the UK donation did not constitute "material increase" in support for the foundation.

CharityWatch, a nonprofit charity watchdog organization, has given the Clinton Foundation an "A rating" overall, higher than the American Red Cross, and the "highest rated" grade for "Transparency and Governance". The charity watchdog group Charity Navigator gave the Clinton Foundation its highest possible rating, four out of four stars, after reviewing its financial records and tax statements.

=== Reaction to controversy in 2016 ===
Democratic Senator Bernie Sanders, during his unsuccessful presidential campaign, criticized Clinton for a conflict of interest: "Do I have a problem when a sitting secretary of State and a foundation run by her husband collects many, many dollars from foreign governments — governments which are dictatorships? Yeah, I do have a problem with that. Yeah, I do". Republican Senator John Cornyn, who voted for Clinton's confirmation in 2009, says that she duped Congress, that he now regrets his vote, and that President Obama should appoint a special prosecutor to investigate whether donors to the foundation gained improper access at the State Department.

An August 30, 2016 editorial by The New York Times opined there was no proof that donors to the foundation received special favors from Hillary Clinton when she was Secretary of State. However, the Times added that there was reason to question where the Clinton Foundation ended and where the State Department began.

=== FBI investigations ===
In October 2016, The Wall Street Journal reported that four field offices of the Federal Bureau of Investigation—in New York, Los Angeles, Washington, and Little Rock, Ark. -- had been collecting information about the Clinton Foundation to determine whether "there was evidence of financial crimes or influence-peddling." According to the WSJ article, FBI officials presented their findings to the Justice Department in February 2016, but "the meeting didn't go well". Justice Department officials felt the cases were weak and saw little reason to continue the investigations. However, the New York FBI field office continued to pursue the matter, leading to reports that some New York agents were feuding with the Justice Department and basing their investigation in part on media accounts and in particular on the book Clinton Cash, written by Peter Schweizer, a senior editor-at-large for Breitbart News. In a reported separate investigation, the Washington field office had been investigating Terry McAuliffe before he became a board member of the Clinton Foundation.

The Washington Post reported in January 2020 that an additional Justice Department investigation into the matter, initiated after Donald Trump took office in 2017, was winding down after finding nothing worth pursuing.

== See also ==
- Hillary Clinton controversies
