= Clinton Cash =

2015 book by Peter Schweizer

Clinton Cash: The Untold Story of How and Why Foreign Governments and Businesses Helped Make Bill and Hillary Rich
- Author: Peter Schweizer
- Audio read by: Walter Dixon
- Language: English
- Subject: Political science/American government
- Publisher: Harper, Broadside Books
- Publication date: May 5, 2015
- Pages: 256
- ISBN: 978-0-06-236928-4
- OCLC: 906020748
- Preceded by: Extortion: How Politicians Extract Your Money
- Website: www.clintoncashbook.com

Clinton Cash: The Untold Story of How and Why Foreign Governments and Businesses Helped Make Bill and Hillary Rich is a 2015 New York Times bestselling book by Peter Schweizer in which he investigates donations made to the Clinton Foundation by foreign entities, paid speeches made by Bill and Hillary Clinton, and the state of the Clintons' finances since leaving the White House in 2001. It was published by Broadside Books, a division of HarperCollins, and was adapted into both a film and a graphic novel.

== Origins ==
Schweizer wrote the book using researchers from the Government Accountability Institute (GAI), an institution Schweizer formed with the then-Executive Chairman of Breitbart News, Steve Bannon. The Mercer Family Foundation funded the $2.6 million cost of producing the book with a $1.7 million contribution to the Institute in 2015, which was more than GAI's entire budget for the previous year.

== Synopsis ==
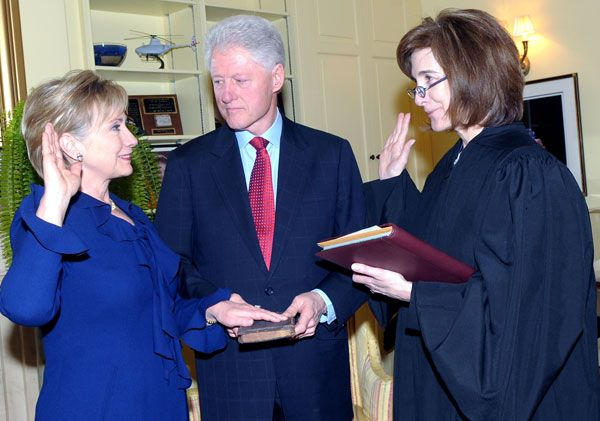
Hillary Clinton being sworn in as Secretary of State in 2009. Her husband and former U.S. president, Bill Clinton, holds the Bible.

Clinton Cash is an investigation of the foreign benefactors of Bill and Hillary Clinton and the Clinton Foundation. It investigates alleged connections between Clinton Foundation donors and Hillary Clinton's work at the State Department.

The book argues that the Clinton family accepted lavish donations and speaking fees from foreign donors at times when the State Department was considering whether to award large contracts to groups and people affiliated with those donors. One of those donors include Mohammed Hussein Al Amoudi, an Ethiopian and Saudi Arabian billionaire businessman.

The book has eleven chapters. Some chapters focus on particular transactions or deals, such as the creation of UrAsia Energy and Uranium One in Kazakhstan, and the connection shareholders had and have to the Clintons. Other chapters focus on a broader set of relationships, particularly with regard to Bill Clinton's paid speeches during the years Hillary Clinton served as Secretary of State, and whether those paying for his speeches had significant business before the State Department. Schweizer dubs the Clintons' blend of government service and private remuneration the "Clinton blur".

== Publication ==
The New York Times, The Washington Post, and Fox News were granted exclusive agreements with the book's author to pursue the story lines found in the book. The Times faced considerable criticism for this arrangement from both its readers and from other media outlets. The paper's own public editor, Margaret Sullivan, said the arrangement was "troubling" and lacked transparency. Salon wrote that Schweizer was not a responsible journalist and that the arrangement showed that right-wing forces were luring the mainstream press into giving attention to gossip and innuendo much as they had during various supposed Clinton controversies of the 1990s. In addition, Media Matters criticized these two newspapers for failing to report in a timely fashion on inaccuracies that had been discovered in the book.

=== Clinton campaign reaction ===
The day the book was published, Hillary Clinton's campaign set up a portal called "The Briefing" on its official website. The Briefing is designed to rebut the allegations made in Schweizer's book. Clinton's campaign manager, John Podesta, wrote: "The book has zero evidence to back up its outlandish claims ... While we will not be consumed by these kinds of attacks, we will also not let them go unchallenged." Various spokespeople for Hillary and Bill Clinton disputed the book's allegations, e.g. concerning the charges that Clinton was paid for speeches by Irish billionaire Denis O'Brien of Digicel in exchange for help in securing telecommunications contracts in Haiti in 2010.

== Commercial reception ==
Clinton Cash debuted at number two on the New York Times Best Seller list. In its first week it sold 31,000 copies and was also second on the Nielsen BookScan ranking for adult nonfiction. The book stayed on the New York Times Best Seller list for hardcover non-fiction for five weeks.

A paperback edition of the book released in 2016 made the relevant Times best seller list as well. According to Fred Barnes of The Weekly Standard, the book sold approximately 200,000 copies, in hardcover and paperback as of July 2016.

== Critical reaction and actions taken ==
Writing for The Washington Post, academic and political activist Lawrence Lessig wrote "On any fair reading, the pattern of behavior that Schweizer has charged is corruption." James Freeman reviewed the book for The Wall Street Journal, writing that "Almost every page of the fascinating Clinton Cash ... will be excruciating reading for partisans on both sides of the aisle".

Ed Pilkington, writing for The Guardian, reported that it was factually correct that "large donations to the foundation from the chairman of Uranium One, Ian Telfer, at around the time of the Russian purchase of the company and while Hillary Clinton was secretary of state, were never disclosed to the public. The multimillion dollar sums were channeled through a subsidiary of the Clinton Foundation, CGSCI, which did not reveal its individual donors." Following publication and in reaction to areas where it said improvements were warranted, the Clinton Foundation said it would put into place some new procedures for better financial reporting and that it would limit some kinds of foreign donations. Pilkington assessed those claims made by the Clinton Foundation as unlikely to put the matter to rest: "But with Bill refusing doggedly to give up his speaker engagements – 'I gotta pay our bills' – and foreign corporations and super-rich individuals still able to donate to the family charity, it looks like this controversy may run and run."

Pilkington also described the book as "an unrestrained attack on the former president and first lady." Pilkington notes that some of the claims in the book have been proven factually inaccurate. A passage concerning TD Bank and the Keystone XL pipeline was based on a supposed press release already known to be fraudulent. Schweizer claimed that Clinton had played a "central role" in the decision to approve Rosatom's purchase of Uranium One, but as Pilkington notes, eight other agencies in addition to the State Department made the call to approve the purchase, and no evidence existed that Clinton herself had participated in the discussions. According to Pilkington, Schweizer does not prove corruption on the part of the Clintons, but "one of his main contentions – that the former president's rates skyrocketed after his wife became secretary of state – is correct ... pointing to several glaring conflicts of interest."

Several weeks after the book's initial publication, HarperCollins and the author made some corrections to the Kindle edition of the book. Schweizer corrected "seven or eight" passages that were revealed to be inaccurate after the book was released. PolitiFact found the assertion that Clinton changed her views on a nuclear deal with India in response to donations to her family's foundation to be false.

== Film adaptation ==
In May 2016, a film adaptation of the book, funded by co-founder of Government Accountability Institute and Breitbart News executive chairman Steve Bannon (CEO of the Donald Trump presidential campaign, 2016), was screened at the Cannes Film Festival.

Time magazine reported that conservatives were not the intended audience for the film adaptation of the book: "Environmentalists. Anti-nuke activists. Gay-rights advocates. Good-government folks. They're all going to find themselves increasingly uncomfortable over claims that the likely Democratic nominee, in the film's words, takes cash from the 'darkest, worst corners of the world.'"

The film's U.S. premiere was scheduled for July 24, 2016, in Philadelphia (prior to the 2016 Democratic National Convention there) and the film had a limited release in four other major U.S. cities in early August.

== Graphic novel adaptation ==
A graphic novel adaptation of the book, written by Chuck Dixon and illustrated by Brett R. Smith, was released by Regnery Publishing on August 8, 2016. This edition spent three weeks on the New York Times best seller list for the Hardcover Graphic format.

== See also ==
- Clinton Foundation–State Department controversy
- Dark Money
- Uranium One controversy
