= Reagan's War =

2002 book by Peter Schweizer

Reagan's War: The Epic Story of His Forty-Year Struggle and Final Triumph over Communism
- First edition (publ. Doubleday)
- Author: Peter Schweizer
- Language: English
- Genre: History
- Publisher: Doubleday
- Publication date: October 15, 2002
- Publication place: United States
- Media type: Print (hardcover and paperback)
- Pages: 352 (first edition)
- ISBN: 0-385-50471-3

Reagan's War is a 2002 book by Peter Schweizer.

== Synopsis ==
The book covers Ronald Reagan's actions during the Cold War, and credits him with the eventual end of the Cold War.

== Reception ==
The book received mixed reviews. Publishers Weekly praised Schweizer's writing style, while criticizing the book's hagiographical approach to history. Walter Russell Mead gave the book a positive review in The Washington Post. Kirkus Reviews called the book a "tendentious and extremely partisan account" of Reagan's presidency and the Cold War. The book was later adapted into a film titled In the Face of Evil: Reagan's War in Word and Deed.
