= David Barlow (judge) =

American judge (born 1971)

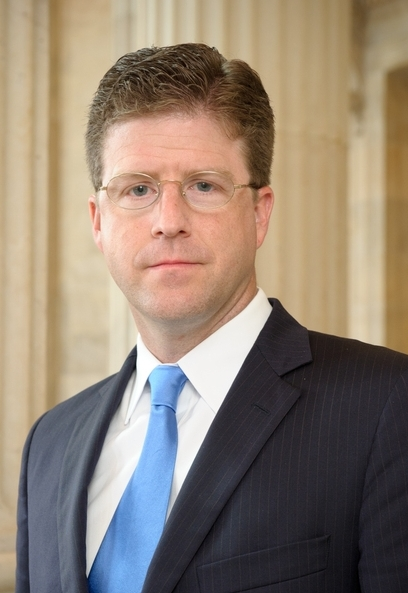

Judge of the United States District Court for the District of Utah
- Incumbent
- Assumed office January 6, 2020
- Appointed by: Donald Trump
- Preceded by: Clark Waddoups

United States Attorney for the District of Utah
- In office October 5, 2011 – July 2014
- President: Barack Obama
- Preceded by: Brett Tolman
- Succeeded by: John W. Huber

Personal details
- Born: 1971 (age 54–55) Provo, Utah, U.S.
- Party: Republican
- Education: Brigham Young University (BA); Yale University (JD)

David Bruce Barlow (born 1971) is a United States district judge of the United States District Court for the District of Utah and a former United States attorney for the same district.

== Education ==
Barlow graduated from Brigham Young University with a Bachelor of Arts degree in 1995, and received his Juris Doctor degree from Yale Law School in 1998.

== Career ==
Barlow began his career as an associate at Locke Lord Bissell & Liddell LLP from 1998 to 2000. From 2000 to 2010, he worked at Sidley Austin; first as an associate from 2000 to 2006, and then as a partner from 2006 to 2010. In 2011, he served as general counsel and chief Judiciary Committee counsel to United States Senator Mike Lee.

=== U.S. attorney for the District of Utah ===
On August 2, 2011, Barlow was nominated to be the United States attorney for the District of Utah. He was confirmed by voice vote on September 26, 2011. He resigned from the Department of Justice in July 2014.

=== Return to the private sector ===
From 2014–2017, Barlow was again a partner at Sidley Austin. He was Vice President for compliance for Walmart’s Health and Wellness businesses from 2017–2018 in Bentonville, Arkansas. Barlow returned to Utah in 2018, when he became a partner in Dorsey & Whitney's Trial and Government Enforcement & Corporate Investigations Practice groups. Barlow worked at Dorsey & Whitney until becoming a judge.

=== Federal judicial service ===
On May 29, 2019, President Donald Trump announced his intent to nominate Barlow to serve as a United States district judge of the United States District Court for the District of Utah. On June 12, 2019, his nomination was sent to the Senate. President Trump nominated Barlow to the seat vacated by Judge Clark Waddoups, who assumed senior status on January 31, 2019. On July 17, 2019, a hearing on his nomination was held before the Senate Judiciary Committee. On October 17, 2019, his nomination was reported out of committee by a 19–3 vote. On December 3, 2019, the United States Senate invoked cloture on his nomination by a 88–4 vote. On December 4, 2019, his nomination was confirmed by a 88–4 vote. He received his judicial commission on January 6, 2020.

Legal offices
Preceded by Brett Tolman	United States Attorney for the District of Utah; 2011–2014	Succeeded by John W. Huber
Preceded by Clark Waddoups	Judge of the United States District Court for the District of Utah; 2020–present	Incumbent
