= Wynton Hall =

American author and editor

Wynton C. Hall
- Education: University of Florida (BA); Texas A&M University (MA)
- Political party: Republican

Wynton C. Hall is an American author and the managing editor and social media director of Breitbart News. He is also the owner of Wynton Hall & Co, a celebrity ghostwriting and communications agency, and a communication strategist for the Government Accountability Institute, a conservative think tank. He has ghostwritten several New York Times bestsellers, including Donald Trump's book Time to Get Tough.
