= The Speech (Sanders book) =

2011 book by Bernie Sanders

The Speech: A Historic Filibuster on Corporate Greed and the Decline of Our Middle Class
- Author: Bernie Sanders
- Language: English
- Publisher: PublicAffairs, Bold Type Books
- Publication date: March 1, 2011; 2015
- Publication place: United States
- Pages: 288
- ISBN: 978-1-56858-554-3

The Speech: A Historic Filibuster on Corporate Greed and the Decline of Our Middle Class is a 2011 political book authored by U.S. Senator Bernie Sanders and published by PublicAffairs. In 2015, it was reprinted by Bold Type Books with a new foreword.

The book is a transcript of the filibuster Sanders delivered on the U.S. Senate floor on December 10, 2010, against the Tax Relief, Unemployment Insurance Reauthorization, and Job Creation Act of 2010. The speech lasted 8 hours and 37 minutes.

== Content ==
The book contains the text of the 8 1/2–hour speech Sanders delivered against the 2010 Tax Relief Act. The compromise bill proposed extending the Bush-era tax rates, while extending some of the provisions of the 2009 Recovery Act. Sanders argued that the legislation would favor the wealthiest Americans, mocking the need for the wealthy to own multiple homes. "Enough is enough! ... How many homes can you own?" he asked.

Despite his objections, the bill eventually passed the Senate with a strong majority, and was signed into law on December 17, 2010.

== Reception ==
Matt Taibbi of Rolling Stone praised the book, saying, “Bernie Sanders is such a rarity, and people should appreciate what he’s doing not just for his home state of Vermont, but for the reputation of all politicians in general.”

In response to the speech, hundreds of people signed online petitions urging Sanders to run in the 2012 presidential election, and pollsters began measuring his support in key primary states. Progressive activists such as Rabbi Michael Lerner and economist David Korten publicly voiced their support for a prospective Sanders run against President Obama. While Sanders declined to run for president in 2012 (instead running for re-election to the Senate), he would later run in 2016 and again in 2020.
