= John W. Huber =

American lawyer (born 1967)

John Huber
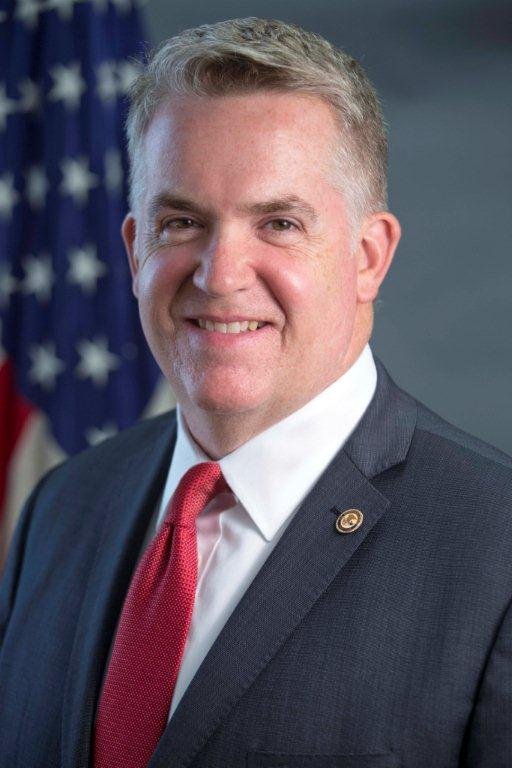

United States Attorney for the District of Utah
- In office June 15, 2015 – February 28, 2021
- President: Barack Obama; Donald Trump; Joe Biden
- Preceded by: David Barlow
- Succeeded by: Trina A. Higgins

Personal details
- Born: 1967 or 1968 (age 58–59) Salt Lake City, Utah, U.S.
- Education: University of Utah (BA, JD)

John W. Huber (born 1967) is an American lawyer who served as the United States Attorney for the District of Utah from June 2015 to February 2021. He was first nominated for the position by President Barack Obama in February 2015. Huber offered his resignation in March 2017 at the request of the Trump administration. However, United States Attorney General Jeff Sessions subsequently appointed Huber as interim U.S. Attorney under the Federal Vacancies Reform Act. Huber was renominated by President Donald Trump in June 2017. On August 3, 2017, he was unanimously confirmed by the United States Senate to an additional four-year term as a U.S. Attorney.

On February 8, 2021, the Justice Department asked for his resignation, along with those of 55 other Trump-era attorneys. He resigned on February 28, 2021.

== Education and legal career ==
Huber graduated with honors from the University of Utah in 1989. He received his Juris Doctor from the University of Utah College of Law in 1995. Huber began his career in the Weber County, Utah Attorney's Office, later serving as the chief prosecutor for West Valley City, Utah. In 2002, he joined the U.S. Attorney's Office, and in 2005 he became an Assistant United States Attorney. He has prosecuted firearms crimes, including the case of four people involved with firearms used in the 2007 Trolley Square shooting. Huber was appointed by U.S. Attorney General Jeff Sessions to investigate the FBI's surveillance of Carter Page and connections between the Clinton Foundation and Uranium One, starting in November 2017. Huber closed the investigation in January 2020 without finding malfeasance. That June, Trump tweeted that Huber had done "absolutely nothing" and was "a garbage disposal unit for important documents."
