= Hard Choices =

2014 book by Hillary Clinton

- 2014 hardback cover
- Author: Hillary Rodham Clinton
- Language: English
- Genre: Memoir
- Publisher: Simon & Schuster
- Publication date: June 10, 2014
- Publication place: United States
- Media type: Print
- Pages: 656
- ISBN: 978-1-4767-5144-3

Hard Choices is a memoir of former United States Secretary of State Hillary Rodham Clinton, published by Simon & Schuster in 2014, giving her account of her tenure in that position from 2009 to 2013. It also discusses some personal aspects of her life and career, including her feelings towards President Barack Obama following her 2008 presidential campaign loss to him. It is generally supportive of decisions made by the Obama administration.

The book was promoted partly in light of the possibility of a Clinton bid in the 2016 presidential election (in which, two years after the release of the book, she would go on to win the Democratic nomination and then lose to Donald Trump in the general election). Excerpts from the book were released in advance of its publication. Clinton staged an extensive promotional tour for the book, which had the air of a political campaign with groups both for and against her appearing at book-signing events. Hard Choices reached #1 on The New York Times Best Seller list, but sold considerably less than her 2003 memoir, Living History. Interpreting what sales of the book meant for her possible political future became a subject for discussion among interested parties.

== Conception and development ==
Clinton's last day as Secretary of State was February 1, 2013. As she departed from office, she indicated she was unsure of her future plans but that they did include writing another memoir to follow Living History.

On April 4, 2013, Simon & Schuster, her previous publisher, announced that Clinton had signed with them for this new work, with a target publication date of June 2014. Lawyer Robert Barnett handled the negotiations from Clinton's side; the financial terms of any advance or royalties were not publicly disclosed. The New York Post reported "industry speculation" as saying that her advance could be as high as $14 million. Although not confirmed, that figure has been repeated by some other news sources. From the beginning, the book was partly seen in the light of a possible Clinton bid for the 2016 presidential election.

Clinton was assisted in writing the book by three aides credited in the Acknowledgements section as her "book team", two former State Department assistants, speechwriter Dan Schwerin and researcher Ethan Gelber, and Ted Widmer, a speechwriter in the Bill Clinton administration. The first draft of the manuscript was three times its final length. Clinton later said that the writing process had been "terrific" overall, but that "some days were off-the-charts wonderful and some days were not-even-on-the-charts terrible."

In April 2014, the official publication date of the book was announced as June 10, 2014, and the title of the book was revealed as Hard Choices about a week later.

== Themes of the book ==
The book contained 635 pages of numbered text, accompanied by three sections of plates containing a total of 100 colored photographs.

In the book, Clinton frames the foreign policy situations encountered during her tenure as a series of hard choices, especially those involving the Middle East and the Arab Spring, Afghanistan and Pakistan, and Russia. Special attention is given to the Egyptian Revolution of 2011 and her relations with Egyptian President and longtime personal friend Hosni Mubarak.

Clinton sometimes delves into disagreements within the Obama administration and where she stood, such as her losing the argument to arm moderate elements of the Syrian opposition. In many other cases, however, she does not, saying such discussions "will remain private to honor the code of confidentiality that should exist between a president and his Secretary of State, especially while he is still in office."

A chapter of the book dealing with the 2012 Benghazi attack – in which the U.S. diplomatic mission in Benghazi, Libya, was attacked, resulting in the deaths of the U.S. ambassador to that country, J. Christopher Stevens, and three other Americans – was leaked to Politico. It reiterates the explanations for what happened that Clinton and her supporters had previously made.

Clinton also delves into some personal aspects of her life and career, including getting past any hard feelings towards Obama from her 2008 presidential campaign, events in her family including her daughter Chelsea Clinton's wedding, and personal interactions with citizens of other countries during her travels as secretary. The book also addresses the disappointment of her 2008 loss, and for the first time fully recants her 2002 vote on the Iraq War Resolution that cost her in that campaign, writing that "I thought I had acted in good faith and made the best decision I could with the information I had. And I wasn't alone in getting it wrong. But I still got it wrong. Plain and simple."

The book concludes with some general thoughts about her visions for the United States going forward, but it shed no light on whether she would run for president in 2016, saying only, "[t]he time for another hard choice will come soon."

== Promotional efforts ==
Excerpts of the books came out early. The first was in early May 2014, when Vogue published an excerpt in celebration of Mother's Day that was about and dedicated to Clinton's mother Dorothy Rodham, who had died during Clinton's time as secretary. Simon & Schuster released an Author's Note explaining some of Clinton's perspectives on the book. A video appeared on the book's Facebook page the following day. A cover appearance on People magazine was also made to promote the book.

Later, the chapter of the book dealing with the Benghazi attack was leaked to Politico. Observers suspected this was done to get news about it out of the way early so it would not dominate later coverage of the book as a whole. Shortly before the book's publication date, a passage that dealt with the now-repatriated soldier Bowe Bergdahl was made public as well. The promotional book roll-out was staffed by veterans of political campaigns and political communications efforts, rather than the publicists who usually conduct such efforts.

There was competition among top news anchors and interviewers to get the first interviews with Clinton about the book. In the end, Clinton sat down with several of them; the first went to ABC News' Diane Sawyer and aired on June 9. The interviews themselves sometimes made news on topics unrelated to those covered by the book, such as Clinton's description to Sawyer of her and Bill's financial state as they left the White House ("dead broke") and an exchange with NPR's Terry Gross on Clinton's evolving views on same-sex marriage. A later, unannounced appearance on The Colbert Report earned her some positive notices for a comic touch in her mock exchanges with host Stephen Colbert.

A promotional book tour in the United States and Canada began on June 10 with a book signing at a Barnes & Noble store in New York that attracted over a thousand people. Other events, sometimes multiple per day, included a public discussion forum in Chicago with Mayor Rahm Emanuel, a former Clinton administration aide. When signing books, she just wrote "Hillary"; no signing of personal items or extra messages were allowed. Clinton's longtime aide Huma Abedin was in charge of managing each event.

The tour events had the air of campaign stops. Each brought considerable local media attention. The independent Super PAC known as Ready for Hillary parked a "Hillary Bus" nearby and handed out stickers and posters and signed up volunteers. She herself has never gone on the bus; The Washington Post described it as "a campaign bus before there is even a campaign".

Meanwhile, the Republican National Committee had an intern go around greeting attendees in a large orange squirrel suit. It wore a shirt with the message "Another Clinton in the White House is Nuts" and was accompanied by other staffers handing out sheets with anti-Clinton talking points. During one promotional appearance in Washington, D.C., Clinton went up to the orange figure and said, "Hello, Mr. Squirrel, how are you? I wanted you to get you a copy of my book," adding, "you bring a smile to a lot of people's faces." The copy she gave the squirrel was inscribed, "Squirrel – Please make a hard choice and read my book! Hillary".

In early July, Clinton went to Europe to stage promotional appearances for the book, visiting England, Germany, and France. Book signings back in the U.S. continued for the rest of that month. The length of the promotional tour recalled her heavy travel schedule as Secretary of State, and largely put to rest questions about her health that had circulated among some since her concussion and blood clot treatment in late 2012. While the appearances and the news coverage of some of her statements during the tour exposed some of Clinton's strengths and weaknesses as a public figure, they did not change Clinton's poll approval numbers.

== Critical and commercial reception ==
Initial reviews for Hard Choices were generally mixed to favorable.

Writing for The New York Times, longtime book critic Michiko Kakutani said that the volume is better than Clinton's previous memoir and that Hard Choices "turns out to be a subtle, finely calibrated work that provides a portrait of the former secretary of state and former first lady as a heavy-duty policy wonk." David Ignatius, writing in The Washington Post, said the memoir "begins and ends in the empty voice of a campaign speech. But in between, it contains a clear and at times riveting account of Hillary Rodham Clinton's four years as secretary of state." Robin Abcarian of the Los Angeles Times assessed it as "a richly detailed and compelling chronicle of Clinton's role in the foreign initiatives and crises that defined the first term of the Obama administration ... told from the point of view of a policy wonk."

John Dickerson of Slate magazine characterized it as "a risk-free telling of Clinton's world travels" and compared it unfavorably to Duty: Memoirs of a Secretary at War, the recent account by Robert Gates, Clinton's cabinet colleague as Secretary of Defense. Dickerson added, "Clinton's account is the low-salt, low-fat, low-calorie offering with vanilla pudding as the dessert. She goes on at great length, but not great depth." Michael Scherer of Time magazine declared, "This is a campaign book, written by a candidate (via her speechwriters), processed through a political machine, and delivered to the public with the contradictory goals of depicting the author as a decisive leader and not betraying any evidence of leadership that would turn a voter off." Ed Pilkington of The Guardian wrote that it was a less overt campaign manifesto than Barack Obama's The Audacity of Hope had been in 2006, but "still manages to adroitly position Clinton for a 2016 presidential bid." Peter Baker of the The New York Times Book Review compared it somewhat unfavorably with former State Secretary Dean Acheson's 1969 memoir, Present at the Creation: My Years in the State Department, concluding his review by alluding to Clinton's possible presidential aspirations by saying that "Acheson won a Pulitzer Prize for his memoir. Clinton seems to have a bigger prize in mind."

By the time of the book's publication, it was said to have already received one million pre-orders. In actuality, Simon & Schuster said that it during its first week on sale, it sold over 100,000 copies, a figure supported by extrapolation of the underlying Nielsen BookScan data. It debuted at number one on The New York Times Best Seller list for hardcover nonfiction. During its second and third weeks of availability, sales of Hard Choices declined markedly, but were still enough to keep it atop the Times Best Seller list. In the fourth week, sales declined again and the book surrendered the top spot on the Times Best Seller list to Edward Klein's Blood Feud: The Clintons vs. the Obamas, a lurid and lightly sourced account of purported rivalries between the two couples and within each marriage. By this point, Hard Choices had sold some 177,000 physical copies. By the end of July, the book had sold about 250,000 copies overall, including an estimate for e-book sales. In all, it spent twelve weeks on The New York Times Best Seller list, nine of them in the top five.

Whether sales for the book were living up to expectations, or indicated a lack of public interest in hearing from Clinton, became an immediate subject for public relations and political spin from interested parties. Its sales were better than those of memoirs by other former members of the Obama administration, but were considerably less than they had been in the comparable period for Clinton's first memoir Living History. The publisher explained this as partly due to the differing contents of the two memoirs and partly due to the declining market for physical, nonfiction books over the decade between the two. In any case, Simon & Schuster was unlikely to make back Clinton's advance or to sell all the copies it had shipped. Politico termed the book's sales "a solid figure in a depleted publishing industry but far from the juggernaut her backers hoped for."

The book continued to accumulate sales into the year following its publication. By March 2015, Nielsen BookScan had it selling 264,000 copies, and figure that rose to 280,000 copies by July 2015 and 292,200 copies by March 2016. By mid-2015, Clinton had earned more than $5 million in royalties from the book. Compared to recent books published by the many 2016 Republican presidential candidates, her sales were well short of Ben Carson's One Nation: What We Can All Do To Save America's Future, but were well ahead of those of any of the others, with only the combined sales of a pair of books by Donald Trump coming close. By late November 2015, counting both print and e-books, Time magazine said Hard Choices had sold a little over 340,000 units.

== Foreign editions and translations ==
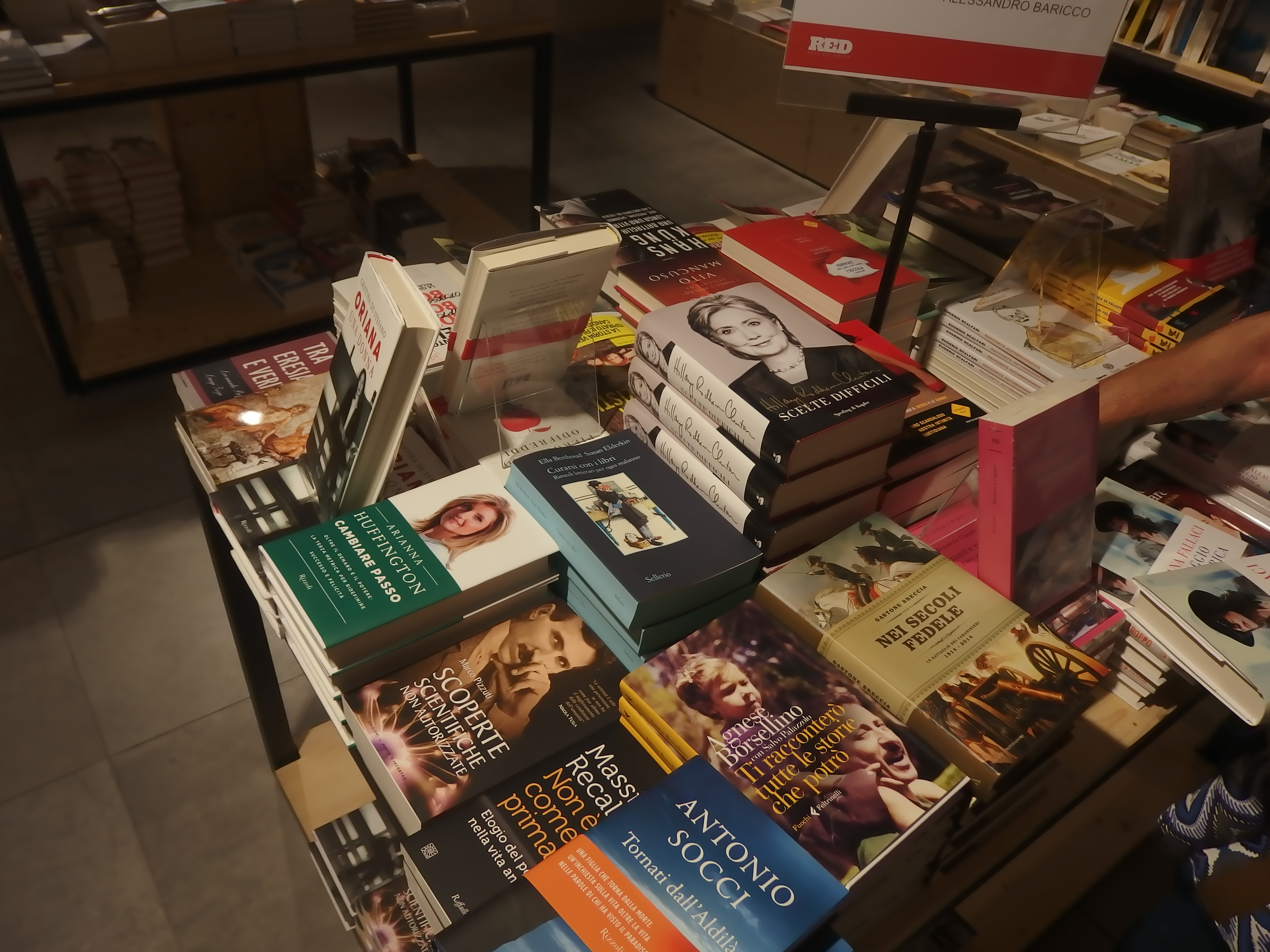
The Italian language edition, Scelte difficili, on sale at a bookstore in Florence

Simon & Schuster viewed international and foreign language sales as key to the book's potential for success. On its initial release date of June 10, it was published in Canada, Great Britain, Australia, India, Germany, the Netherlands, and France. A Spanish language translation, Decisiones difíciles, was released on June 24 in the U.S. Altogether, foreign rights to the book were sold in sixteen countries.

While also available in Hong Kong and Taiwan, Hard Choices was effectively banned in mainland China as publishers there declined to purchase either the translation or English-language distribution rights for the book. Although Chinese publishers did not offer a specific reason for declining to buy the book, Simon & Schuster asserted that the ban was politically motivated as import agencies and publishers were fearful of retaliation by the Chinese government for printing material that was too politically sensitive, such as the chapter-length coverage of Chinese dissident Chen Guangcheng and Clinton's generally critical comments about the Chinese government.

== Paperback version ==
The paperback version of Hard Choices followed the hardcover and was released on April 28, 2015, two weeks after the announcement of her 2016 presidential campaign. The new epilogue from the paperback edition, titled "A New Chapter", was initially published by The Huffington Post by Clinton on April 10. The paperback version also has a new cover, in color, in which Clinton is angled away from the camera, turning her head and smiling slightly, while dressed in a blue, collared shirt and wearing bold silver earrings.
