= Do as I Say (Not as I Do) =

Book by Peter Schweizer

Do as I Say (Not as I Do): Profiles in Liberal Hypocrisy
- Author: Peter Schweizer
- Language: English
- Publisher: Doubleday
- Publication date: 2005
- Publication place: United States
- ISBN: 0385513496

Do as I Say (Not as I Do): Profiles in Liberal Hypocrisy (ISBN 0385513496) is a book written by author Peter Schweizer and published by Doubleday in 2005. The book profiles contradictions and hypocritical behaviors of several famous individuals in the United States who are liberals. People profiled in the book include Ted Kennedy, Nancy Pelosi, Bill and Hillary Clinton, Ralph Nader, Al Franken, Cornel West, Michael Moore, George Soros, Noam Chomsky, Barbra Streisand and Gloria Steinem. Schweizer contends that many liberals publicly promote liberal values regarding the environment, affirmative action, racism, sexism and finance, but practice the opposite in their private and professional lives.

== Summary ==
Notable issues that Schweizer addresses in the work are Noam Chomsky's acceptance of money from prominent institutions whose policies he opposes (such as the Pentagon), living in an expensive home, and his visitation of socialist states such as Cuba. Chomsky considers himself an anarchist, not a liberal. Schweizer, in the rest of the work, makes similarly-toned accusations against individuals the book focuses on, particularly surrounding political issues such as environmentalism, labor, and taxation. After the book's publication, Chomsky talked to Schweizer about his creation of a trust fund for his daughters and grandchildren. In Schweizer's follow up discussion with Chomsky, Schweizer reveals that even though Chomsky abhors corporations and refers to them as "fascist", Chomsky's own retirement fund is invested in large capitalization NYSE companies and the TIAA-CREF stock fund. Schweizer points out:

A look at the stock fund portfolio quickly reveals that it invests in all sorts of businesses that Chomsky says he finds abhorrent: oil companies, military contractors, pharmaceuticals, you name it.

In addition, during his publicity tours, Schweizer spoke of Arianna Huffington's use of private jets for transportation and excessive energy consumption, despite her public pro-environmentalist stance.

== Reception ==
Schweizer's book was generally well-received, showing up on New York Times bestsellers list in early 2006 and garnering praise from pundits such as Bill O'Reilly.

A television station in San Francisco, KGO-TV, reviewed Schweizer's claims against Nancy Pelosi. It found Schweizer's allegation that the workers at Pelosi's vineyard were not union workers to be true. The station also reported that the 1975 California Agricultural Labor Relations Act prevents Pelosi from assisting her workers in forming a union; or discussing a union contract with them unless they unionized on their own. The investigating reporter claimed that Pelosi paid her workers more than the largest union winery in the region. Schweitzer responded, “It's not my responsibility to go and find out how every single particular circumstance is handled on the Pelosi vineyard.”.

Al Franken wrote to the conservative publication National Review to dispute Schweizer's claims that he does not hire minorities. He gave several examples of minority employees who have worked on his radio and television shows.
