= On the Issues =

American non-partisan, non-profit organization

- Formation: 1996; 30 years ago
- Founder: Jesse Gordon
- Legal status: Non-profit
- Purpose: Store American candidates' views and records for American voters
- Headquarters: Cambridge, Massachusetts; Missoula, Montana
- Owner: Naomi Lichtenberg
- Parent organization: Snopes
- Website: ontheissues.org

On the Issues or OnTheIssues is an American non-partisan, non-profit organization providing information to American voters on American candidates, primarily via their website. The organization was started in 1996, went non-profit in 2000, and is currently run primarily by volunteers.

The owner and CEO of On the Issues is Naomi Lichtenberg. The editor-in-chief and content manager is Jesse Gordon. The organization is headquartered in Cambridge, Massachusetts and Missoula, Montana.

The organization's stated mission is to help voters pick candidates "based on issues rather than on personalities and popularity." They obtain their information from newspapers, speeches, press releases, book excerpts, House and Senate voting records, Congressional bill sponsorships, political affiliations and ratings, and campaign websites from the Internet.

In 2004, the Baltimore Sun included OnTheIssues in a list of websites that helped voters to make educated decisions. Among other things, they offer an online quiz "that aims to bring together the politically compatible – a wonk's version of an online dating service." The "VoteMatch Quiz" has 20 questions, and matches users' answers against candidates for president and for Congress. The quiz also assigns a "political philosophy" by analyzing the answers on social and economic issues.

The OnTheIssues website is characterized by heavy content and a lack of fancy technical features: an "information-rich, plain-jane site," according to U.S. News & World Report. The website contains 75,000 pages covering about 1,000 incumbents and challengers, as of early 2014.

On the Issues collaborated with Americans Elect to prepare for the AmericansElect.org convention in June 2012 by preparing platforms of questions for members of Congress, governors, mayors, and numerous other possible nominees inferred from voting records, bill sponsorships, and other public statements.

On the Issues launched an app on the iTunes store called Pres2016, that presented content on 2016 presidential contenders' views on various issues, from content available on the website.

In the fall of 2015, On the Issues began a collaboration with the internet search engine Bing to provide balanced and impartial political content for a Bing political quiz which itself is based on a text parsing tool.

The Snopes Media Group, the parent of fact-checking website Snopes, announced it acquired the OnTheIssues website and re-launched in January 2022 as its "first-ever political newsletter"; the newsletter is sent by email every two weeks to subscribers.

== See also ==
- Nolan Chart
- Political spectrum
- Project Vote Smart
