= Peter Schweizer =

American writer

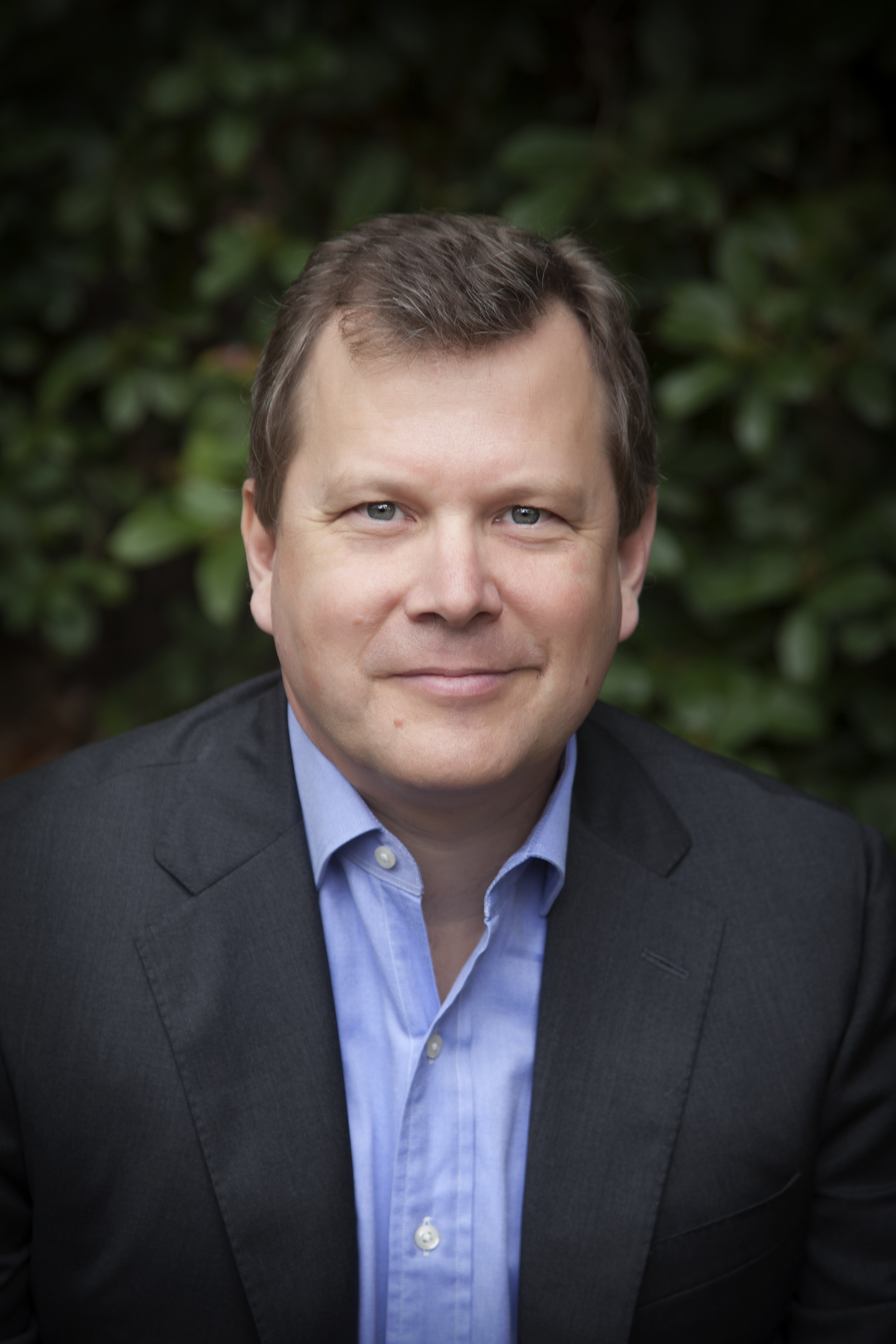
- Born: Peter Franz Schweizer; November 24, 1964 (age 61)
- Education: George Washington University (BA); St Cross College, Oxford (MPhil)
- Occupations: Political consultant, author
- Spouses: Rochelle Schweizer (divorced); Rhonda Schweizer (m. 2013)
- Children: 2
- Website: Official website

Peter Franz Schweizer (born November 24, 1964) is an American political consultant and writer. He is the president of the Government Accountability Institute (GAI), senior editor-at-large of far-right media organization Breitbart News, and a former fellow at the conservative Hoover Institution.

Schweizer wrote Clinton Cash, a 2015 book discussing donations made to the Clinton Foundation by foreign entities and Bill and Hillary Clinton's income after they left the White House in 2001. Journalists and fact-checking organizations have criticized the book for speculation, conclusions not supported by the evidence presented, and for misinformation and disinformation which were corrected in the Kindle edition.

== Early life ==
While in high school, Schweizer attended the National Conservative Students Conference at George Washington University and was a member of Young America's Foundation (YAF). He graduated from Kentwood High School in Kent, Washington in 1983. Schweizer then attended George Washington University and, subsequently, graduate school at St Cross College of Oxford University on YAF scholarships. He was on YAF staff starting 1993 and edited its magazine.

== Career ==
In 2012, Schweizer and Steve Bannon co-founded the Government Accountability Institute, a conservative think-tank whose stated goal is to "investigate and expose government corruption, misuse of taxpayer money and crony capitalism." Schweizer is president of the organization. It is registered as a nonpartisan organization, but largely focuses on the Democratic Party.

== Investigative projects ==
Schweizer's early work at Senator Jeremiah Denton's National Forum Foundation (NFF) focused on the Cold War. He co-authored a National Review article with Denton's son, James (often cited as Jim), "Murdering SDI", about the suspicious deaths of several European officials who supported the Strategic Defense Initiative. While at the NFF, Schweizer also published a report titled "The Meaning and Destiny of the Sandinista Revolution".

In 2012, journalist Steve Kroft used Schweizer's work as the basis for a report on CBS's 60 Minutes about Congressional insider trading. Titled "Insiders: The road to the STOCK act", Kroft relied heavily on Schweizer's reporting in his 2011 book Throw Them All Out, which CBS independently verified, to demonstrate how members of Congress trade stocks unethically, and inoculate themselves from prosecution. The following year, Kroft revisited Schweizer's work to create another 60 Minutes report on how members of Congress use the funds of their political action committees for private inurement.

== Books ==
Schweizer co-authored two novels, published in 1997 and 2005, with former Secretary of Defense Caspar Weinberger.

=== Friendly Spies ===
Schweizer's second book, published in 1992, purported to reveal espionage by the French secret service on the British government between 1984 and 1987. A follow-up by two Sunday Times reporters revealed that meetings described by Schweizer in Friendly Spies did not check out, sources were named that did not exist or could not be found, and the hotel in which the meetings allegedly had taken place did not exist at the time.

=== Victory ===
In 1994, The Atlantic Monthly Press published Schweizer's book Victory: The Reagan Administration's Secret Strategy that Hastened the Collapse of the Soviet Union. The book argued that President Ronald Reagan brought an end to the Cold War through a policy of massive defense spending which led to the dissolution of the Soviet Union. Historian Stephen E. Ambrose criticized the book, writing that "there is a great deal more to the Soviet collapse than Schweizer recognizes, and in any case, it is difficult to take seriously a book as badly written as this one... The book is consistently redundant and badly out of balance." The book later enjoyed renewed popularity with foreign policy officials during the Trump administration, with one White House official telling reporters "it was 'no secret' that the book has had some influence on policy."

=== Clinton Cash ===
In 2015, HarperCollins published Clinton Cash: The Untold Story of How and Why Foreign Governments and Businesses Helped Make Bill and Hillary Rich, a 256-page book discussing the donations made to the Clinton Foundation by foreign entities. Several media outlets received advance copies, including The New York Times, The Washington Post, and Fox News, all of whom agreed to pursue stories found in the book. While promoting the book, Schweizer falsely claimed that then-Secretary of State Hillary Clinton had veto power to stop the sale of Uranium One to a Russian state-owned company.

Time wrote that "allegations are presented as questions rather than proof" but that "the book's dark suggestions reflect the growing problem Clinton faces in her run for the White House in 2016 as more and more details of the foundation's fundraising activities present the appearance of impropriety and lack of transparency during her time as Secretary of State."

Several journalists challenged the book, writing that it contains "leaps of logic," that it "draws some conclusions that go beyond the available evidence," that "[p]arts of Schweitzer's reporting fell apart under scrutiny," and that "Schweizer is trafficking in speculation."

The book was found to contain several factual errors, including the false claim that Clinton played a central role in the sale of Uranium One to a Russian state-owned company while the Clinton Foundation was receiving large donations. Several weeks after the book's initial publication, HarperCollins and the author made several corrections to the Kindle edition of the book, amending "seven or eight" passages.

In the wake of the book's publication, the Clinton Foundation admitted that it made mistakes in disclosing some of its contributions and that it implemented new rules increasing financial reporting and limiting foreign donations.

The book was funded by the Mercer Family Foundation with a $1.7 million contribution in 2015 to the Government Accountability Institute (GAI) whose researchers Schweizer used.

=== Secret Empires ===
In 2018, HarperCollins published Secret Empires: How the American Political Class Hides Corruption and Enriches Family and Friends. Secret Empires provided details about the overseas business conducted by Hunter Biden, particularly in his employment with entities such as Ukrainian energy firm Burisma. The book also describes ties between Elaine Chao's family business Foremost Group and China, which were disputed by a spokesman for Chao's husband, Senator Mitch McConnell.

The book "was perfectly timed for the Presidential campaign" and has been cited as an initial source of the Biden–Ukraine conspiracy theory. It was given significant coverage on Fox News which gained Republican nominee Donald Trump's attention and led him to send personal lawyer Rudy Giuliani to Ukraine to pressure their new government to investigate the claims in Schweizer's book. Trump's efforts eventually resulted in a major scandal that culminated in his first impeachment.

The Daily Beast reported that the book contained 14 examples of plagiarism, including from Wikipedia. The passages in question contained similar wording to those of several Wikipedia articles, including four passages largely copied from the article on Patrick R. Daley while citing the article's news sources. Other passages cite sources directly but quote lengthy text passages from without attribution.

== Films ==
Schweizer worked with Steve Bannon on In the Face of Evil: Reagan's War in Words and Deed, a 2004 documentary about former Hollywood movie star and president Ronald Reagan, which is based on Schweizer's book Reagan's War (2003); Schweizer is credited as Executive Producer.

Schweizer is credited as a writer and producer in The Creepy Line, a film that "epitomizes a popular claim that Silicon Valley is censoring American conservatives on web platforms."

== Activities ==
During 2008 and 2009, Schweizer served as a consultant to the Office of Presidential Speechwriting in the White House. In March 2009, Schweizer and fellow White House speechwriter Marc Thiessen opened Oval Office Writers LLC, which specializes in preparation for congressional testimony as well as pitching opinion editorials and book proposals. Schweizer's notable clients have included Sarah Palin, and he advised her on foreign policy.

Schweizer is a member of the Research Advisory Council of the James Madison Institute, a free-market think tank headquartered in Tallahassee, Florida.

== Criticism ==
Schweizer has been criticized for reporting inaccuracies and for making conclusions not supported by facts. Two Sunday Times reporters following up on his reporting in his second book, Friendly Spies, discovered that meetings described by Schweizer did not check out, that named sources did not exist or could not be found, and that there was no Paris Sheraton Hotel during the time period when the meetings allegedly took place.

Schweizer admitted he overreached in attacking Hillary Clinton's purported role in approving a Russian uranium deal and falsely claimed that then-Secretary of State Clinton "had veto power" to stop the Russian State Atomic Nuclear Agency (Rosatom) from purchasing Uranium One. During a May 5, 2015, Politico podcast interview, Schweizer admitted that "veto is probably not the best word" and "what I meant by veto power was as we explain the process, you know, if somebody objects it kicks in the special investigation."

In a 2015 NBC interview, Schweizer said that Hillary Clinton did not support a nuclear deal with India in 2006 and that she voted for it in 2008, after donations to the Clinton Foundation. PolitiFact rated Schweizer's claims false.

== Personal life ==
Schweizer lives in Tallahassee, Florida with his wife, Rhonda, and step-children. He and his first wife, Rochelle Schweizer, co-authored books about Disney and the Bush family. They met when she was working with the National Forum Foundation (NFF), which in 1997 merged with Freedom House.

== Bibliography ==
- The Invisible Coup: How American Elites and Foreign Powers Use Immigration as a Weapon, 2026. (ISBN 978-0-06-342250-6)
- Blood Money: Why the Powerful Turn a Blind Eye While China Kills Americans, 2024 (ISBN 9780063061194)
- Red-Handed: How American Elites Get Rich Helping China Win, 2022 (ISBN 978-0063061149)
- Profiles in Corruption: Abuse of Power by America's Progressive Elite, 2020 (ISBN 978-0062897909)
- Secret Empires: How the American Political Class Hides Corruption and Enriches Family and Friends, 2018 (ISBN 978-0062569363)
- Clinton Cash: The Untold Story of How and Why Foreign Governments and Businesses Helped Make Bill and Hillary Rich, 2015 (ISBN 978-0062369284)
- Bush Bucks: How Public Service and Corporations Helped Make Jeb Rich, 2015 (ASIN B016YYJM36)
- Extortion: How Politicians Extract Your Money, Buy Votes, and Line Their Own Pockets, 2013 (ISBN 978-0544103344)
- Throw Them All Out: How Politicians and Their Friends Get Rich off Insider Stock Tips, Land Deals, and Cronyism That Would Send the Rest of Us to Prison, 2011 (ISBN 978-0547573144)
- Architects of Ruin: How a Gang of Radical Activists and Liberal Politicians Destroyed Trillions of Dollars in Wealth in the Pursuit of Social Justice, 2009 (ISBN 0-061-95334-2)
- Makers and Takers: Why conservatives work harder, feel happier, have closer families, take fewer drugs, give more generously, value honesty more, are less materialistic and envious, whine less ... and even hug their children more than liberals, 2008 (ISBN 0-385-51350-X)
- Chain of Command, with Caspar Weinberger, 2006 (ISBN 0-74343-774-8)
- Do as I Say (Not as I Do): Profiles in Liberal Hypocrisy, 2005 (ISBN 0-385-51349-6)
- The Bushes: portrait of a dynasty, 2004, co-authored with Rochelle Schweizer (ISBN 0-385-49863-2)
- Reagan's War: The Epic Story of His Forty Year Struggle and Final Triumph Over Communism, 2002 (ISBN 0-385-50471-3)
- Disney: The Mouse Betrayed: Greed, Corruption and Children at Risk, 1998 (ISBN 0-89526-387-4)
- The Next War, with Caspar Weinberger, 1998 (ISBN 0-89526-447-1)
- Victory: The Reagan Administration's Secret Strategy That Hastened the Collapse of the Soviet Union, 1994 (ISBN 0-87113-567-1)
- Friendly Spies: How America's Allies Are Using Economic Espionage to Steal Our Secrets, 1992 (ISBN 0-87113-497-7)
- Grinning with the Gipper: Wit, Wisdom and Wisecracks of Ronald Reagan, 1988 (ISBN 0-87113-272-9)
