= BookScan =

Book publishing data company

- Industry: Book Publishing
- Founded: 2001
- Headquarters: Woking, United Kingdom
- Services: Publishing
- Parent: NIQ; Circana (United States)
- Website: Circana BookScan homepage

BookScan is a data provider for the book publishing industry that compiles point of sale data for book sales, owned by Circana in the United States and NIQ in the United Kingdom, Ireland, Australia, New Zealand, India, South Africa, Italy, Spain, Brazil, Mexico, and Poland.

In the United States, Nielsen sold BookScan to NPD in 2017, and the service was renamed NPD BookScan in that territory. Elsewhere in the world, Nielsen BookScan continued to operate as an independent service. In March 2023, the official name for the service became Circana BookScan.

== History ==
Following the success of Nielsen SoundScan which tracked point of sale figures for music, the Nielsen Company decided to launch a similar service for book sales which had been established and was owned by UK based Whitaker & Sons Ltd. Nielsen BookScan was launched in January 2001. Previously, tracking of book sales, such as by the New York Times Best Seller list, was done without raw numbers. The New York Times would survey hundreds of outlets to estimate which books were selling the most copies, and would publish rankings but not figures. Only the publisher of a book tracked how many copies had been sold, but rarely shared this data.

BookScan operated under Nielsen in the US until 2016 when it was acquired by The NPD Group from Nielsen's U.S. market information and research services for the book industry. In the U.S. the service has been a part of NPD Book since January, 2017. In the rest of the world the BookScan service is owned by NIQ. NIQ was formed from the divestiture of consumer intelligence business of the Nielsen Holdings (known as NielsenIQ) to private equity firm Advent International in March 2021.

Since October 2022, the American Booksellers Association has been BookScan’s official aggregator for independent bookstore data.

In March 2023, following the merger of The NPD Group and IRI to form a new company called Circana, NPD BookScan was rebranded as Circana BookScan.

== Methodology ==
BookScan relies on point of sale data from a number of major book sellers. In 2009, BookScan's US Consumer Market Panel covered 75% of retail sales.

== Use of BookScan ==
BookScan was initially greeted with scepticism, but is now widely used by both the publishing industry and the media. Publishers use the numbers to track the success of their rivals. The media uses the figures as a reference to gauge a title's success. Daniel Gross of Slate has noted the increase of pundits using the figures to disparage each other.

BookScan also provided previously unavailable metrics on books published by multiple publishers, such as classic novels in the public domain which may be published by many different houses. Previously, no single entity had figures for the sales of these books; publishers and bookstores only knew their own sales. Slate noted that Jane Austen's Pride and Prejudice was available from Amazon in 130 different editions; prior to BookScan there was no way to tabulate total sales. By summing BookScan data, however, Pride and Prejudice was reported to command sales of 110,000 a year, nearly 200 years after being published.

BookScan records cash register sales of books by tracking ISBNs when a clerk scans the barcode. BookScan only tracks print book sales, thus excluding ebook sales from major e-tailers such as Amazon Kindle, Barnes & Noble Nook, Kobo, Apple, and Google Play. BookScan likewise does not include non-retail sales through channels such as libraries, nor specialty retailers who do not report to the service. The weekend edition of the Wall Street Journal carried bestseller lists from BookScan data (non-fiction and fiction lists broken into traditional book, ebook, and combined lists) until the fall of 2023.

NIQ offers the BookScan service in 10 territories outside the U.S.: the UK, Ireland, Australia, New Zealand, India, South Africa, Italy, Spain, Brazil and Mexico, with Poland next to launch.
