= American Fork Presbyterian Church =

Historic church in Utah, United States

- U.S. National Register of Historic Places
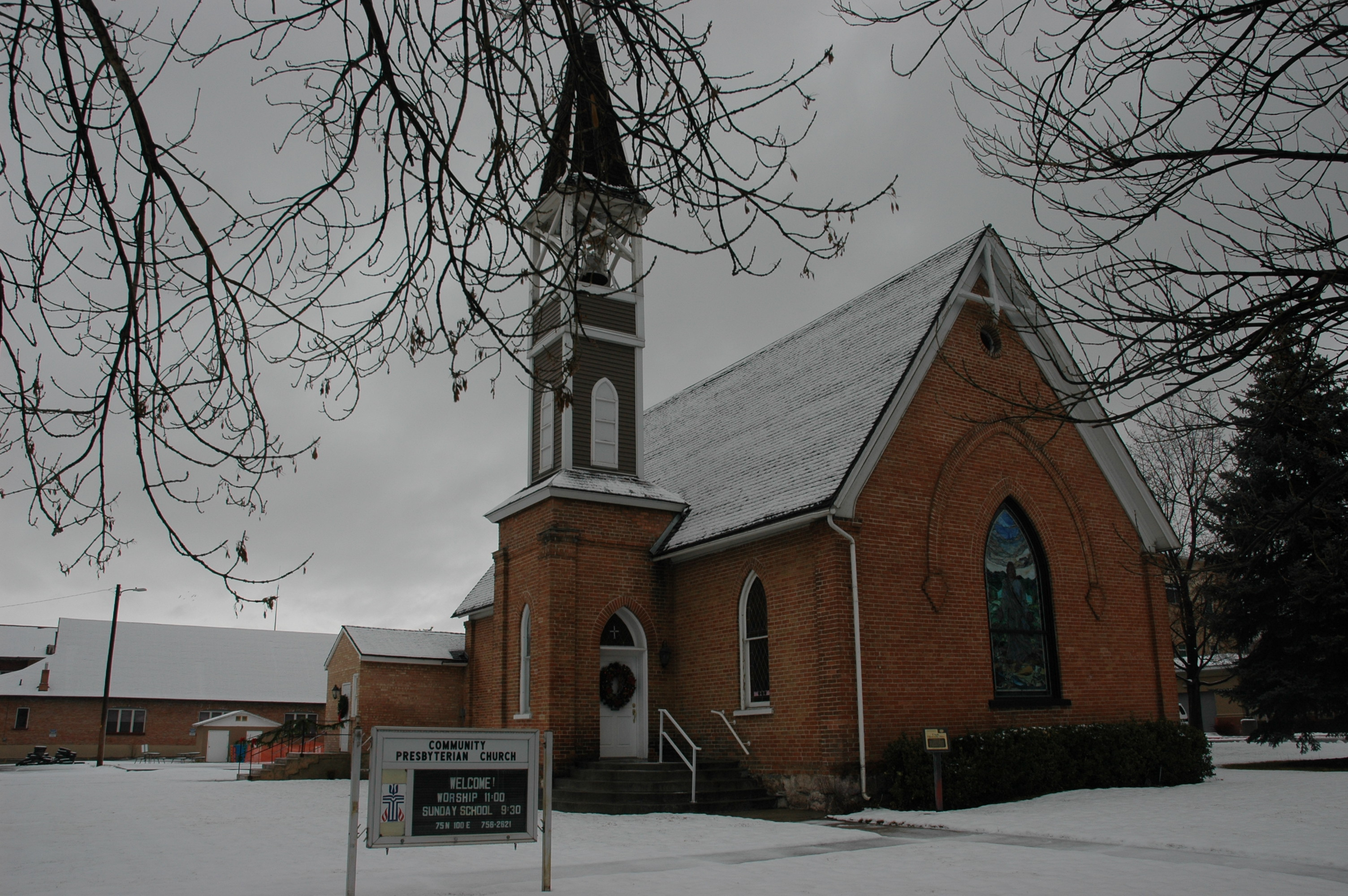
- The church after a snowfall, December 2010

- Location within Utah Location within the United States
- Location: 75 North 100 East; American Fork, Utah; United States
- Coordinates: 40°22′41″N 111°47′44″W
- Area: less than one acre
- Built: 1879
- Architectural style: Gothic Revival
- NRHP reference No.: 80003975
- Added to NRHP: May 23, 1980

American Fork Presbyterian Church (also known as Community Presbyterian Church) is a historic church in American Fork, Utah, United States that is listed on the National Register of Historic Places (NRHP).

== Description ==
The Gothic Revival church building is located at 75 North 100 East and was constructed in 1879. The building was added to the National Register of Historic Places in 1980. It is significant as the first Protestant church in American Fork.

Two meetinghouses of the Church of Jesus Christ of Latter-day Saints (the Church) in American Fork are also NRHP-listed. Non-members of the LDS Church became more numerous after the transcontinental railroad opened in 1869.

The movie Footloose (1984) filmed most of the movie's church scenes in the church.

As of 2012, the congregation is affiliated with the Presbyterian Church (U.S.A.).

== See also ==
- National Register of Historic Places listings in Utah County, Utah
- American Fork Second Ward Meetinghouse
- American Fork Third Ward Meetinghouse
