= Ben Schneider =

Benjamin or Ben Schneider may refer to:

- Ben Schneider (born 1984), American singer and founder of indie rock band Lord Huron
- Reckless Ben (born 1995), American YouTuber, independent filmmaker, entrepreneur, and slackliner
