= Ann Marie McIff Allen =

American judge (born 1972)

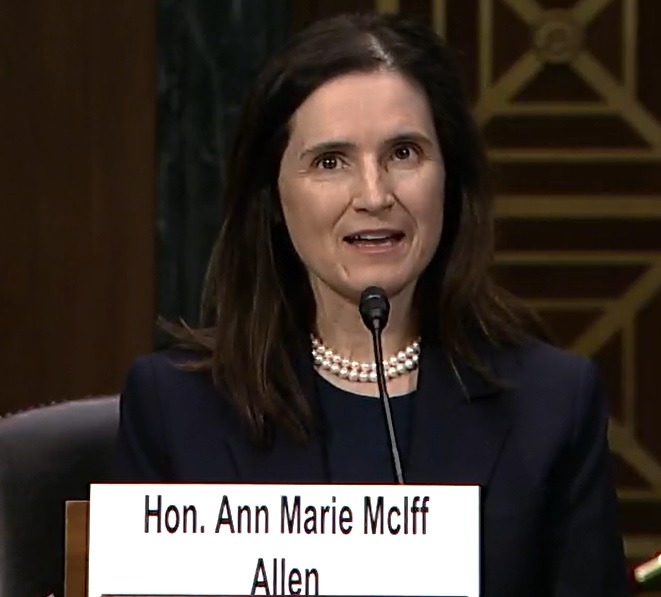

Judge of the United States District Court for the District of Utah
- Incumbent
- Assumed office April 12, 2024
- Appointed by: Joe Biden
- Preceded by: David Nuffer

Judge of the Fifth District Court of Utah
- In office September 2020 – April 12, 2024
- Appointed by: Gary Herbert

Personal details
- Born: Ann Marie McIff; 1972 (age 53–54) Richfield, Utah, U.S.
- Education: Brigham Young University (BA, JD)

Ann Marie McIff Allen (née McIff; born 1972) is an American lawyer who has served as a United States district judge of the United States District Court for the District of Utah since 2024. She previously served as a judge of Utah's Fifth District Court from 2020 to 2024.

== Education ==
Allen received a Bachelor of Arts from Brigham Young University in 1994 and a Juris Doctor from Brigham Young University's J. Reuben Clark Law School in 1997.

== Career ==
From 2001 to 2004, she worked in private practice at Jensen, Graff and Barnes, LLP and from 2004 to 2007 at Allen Law, PC. From 2007 to 2013, she served as a deputy county attorney for the Iron County Attorney's Office in Cedar City. From 2013 to 2020, she was a solo practitioner; simultaneously, she worked at Southern Utah University, first as special counsel and director of ethics (from 2016 to 2017), then as General Counsel (from 2018 to 2020). In July 2020, she was appointed by Utah Governor Gary Herbert to serve as a judge of Utah's Fifth District Court in Cedar City. She was confirmed by the Utah Senate in September 2020.

=== Federal judicial service ===
On December 19, 2023, President Joe Biden announced his intent to nominate Allen to serve as a United States district judge of the United States District Court for the District of Utah. Her nomination received support from Senators Mike Lee and Mitt Romney. Senator Romney recommended her to the federal bench. On January 10, 2024, her nomination was sent to the Senate. President Biden nominated Allen to the seat vacated by Judge David Nuffer, who assumed senior status on April 2, 2022. On January 24, 2024, a hearing on her nomination was held before the Senate Judiciary Committee. On February 29, 2024, her nomination was reported out of committee by a 21–0 vote. On April 9, 2024, the United States Senate invoked cloture on her nomination by a 97–2 vote. On April 10, 2024, her nomination was confirmed by a 100–0 vote, thereby making her the first and only federal judge appointed by Biden to be voted unanimously on record by the full Senate. She received her judicial commission on April 12, 2024.

== Personal life ==
Allen's father, Kay McIff, was a member of the Utah House of Representatives from 2007 to 2017.

Legal offices
Preceded by David Nuffer	Judge of the United States District Court for the District of Utah; 2024–present	Incumbent
