= Bricks & Minifigs–Reckless Ben controversy =

2026 internet and business dispute

In 2026, the American retail franchise Bricks & Minifigs (BAM) and YouTuber Benjamin "Reckless Ben" Schneider became involved in a widely publicized dispute concerning a Lego Star Wars collection consigned to a BAM franchise in Keizer, Oregon. The collection belonged to Ed Mansell and had been placed with the store in 2023. After the store changed ownership in 2024, Mansell's family, including his son Bryan, alleged that the store did not return unsold portions of the collection. The collection's value was disputed; Bryan Mansell, the franchise, and statements from BAM estimated it at $150,000 to $200,000, while store records placed it at around $100,000.

The dispute attracted broader attention in May 2026 after Schneider published a series of YouTube videos investigating the matter and criticizing BAM and the American Fork Police Department in Utah, which had become involved during his investigation. Schneider alleged that the company had attempted to illegally repossess Mansell's collection and that police officers had attempted to cover up the incident. However, BAM and the police department disputed his characterization of events. Schneider was arrested following an attempt to serve legal papers at the home of one of the new Keizer franchise owners, Joshua Johnson, and was charged with stalking, residential targeted picketing, disorderly conduct, and trespassing. (Note: Schneider has not been convicted, and the case is pending further proceedings.) BAM subsequently filed a civil lawsuit accusing Schneider, Bryan Mansell, and others of conducting a campaign of harassment and extortion.

In June 2026, BAM announced that it would end its relationship with the operators of the Keizer store and that the store would be closed permanently. BAM also said it had contacted the Mansell family regarding restitution. A court order restricting Schneider's statements about BAM was lifted on July 7. On August 19, BAM announced a resolution with the Mansell family and said it would drop them from its lawsuit. Bryan Mansell announced on September 2 that he had received his Lego sets from BAM.

== Bricks & Minifigs ==
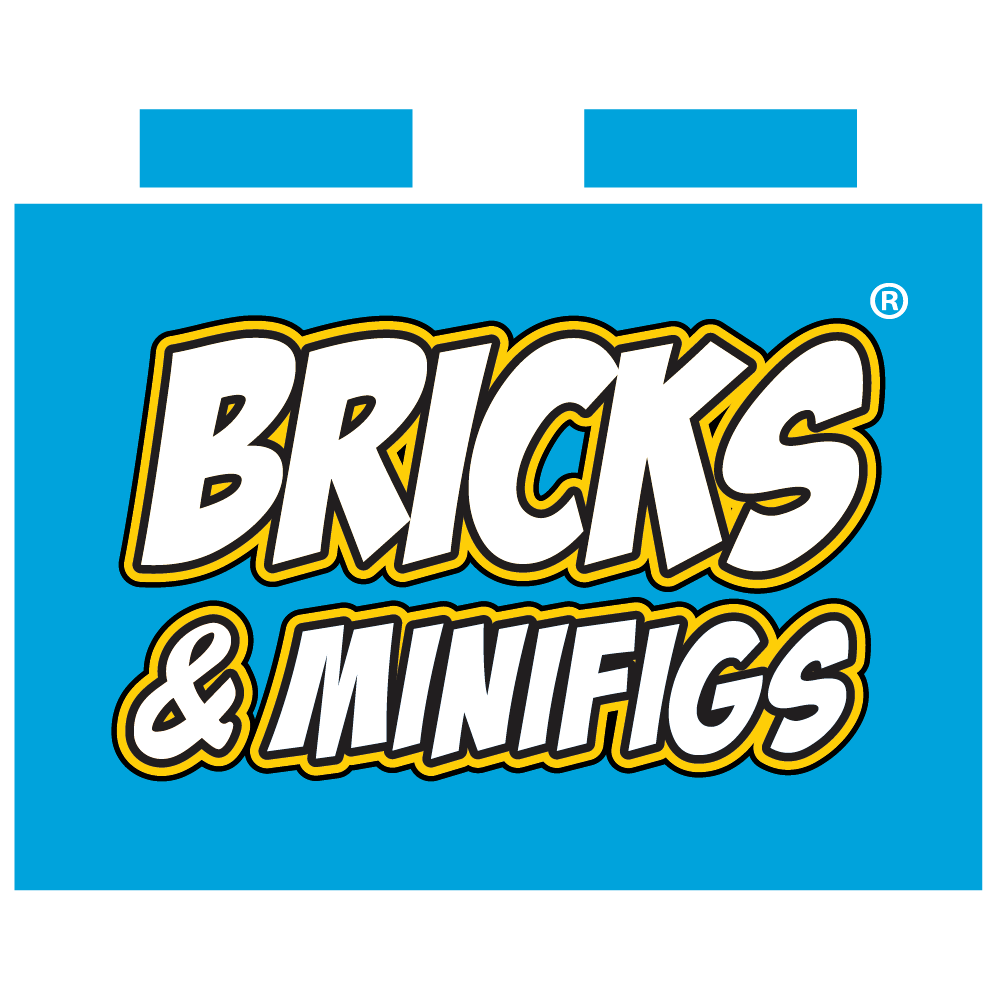
Bricks & Minifigs' logo

Bricks & Minifigs (BAM) is an American retail franchiser founded in 2009, specializing in buying, selling, and trading of mainly Lego products as well as Mega Bloks through its more than 300 franchised locations in the United States and Canada. It operates primarily through independently owned franchise stores.

BAM was founded and originally headquartered in Battle Ground, Washington, by collectors David Ortiz and John Masek, with its first retail outlet opening in 2010. The company was sold to Utah brothers Ammon and Matt McNeff in 2018. Ammon has been the chief executive officer since the acquisition. The headquarters subsequently was relocated to Provo, Utah.

== Consignment dispute ==
In 2023, 83-year-old Ed Mansell, in ill health at the time, consigned his collection of Lego Star Wars sets, which he had been collecting since the early 2000s, to a BAM store in Keizer, Oregon. The store was operated by Chrystal Law-Gorman and Benjamin Gorman at that time.

The consignment arrangement reportedly continued until November 2024, when ownership of the franchise transferred to Brandon Best and Joshua Johnson. Law-Gorman, Gorman, and their LLC have released statements and allege in a lawsuit filed on March 27, 2026, that their Salem-area store was wrongfully seized by BAM Franchising corporate without prior notice, that they were improperly forced out of the store under "threats to 'call the police'", and that they received no compensation for the confiscated assets.

Ed Mansell's son, Bryan Mansell, claimed that after the change in franchise ownership, the new operators refused to return unsold inventory or honor the consignment contract. In response, CEO McNeff stated that BAM Franchising had terminated the previous franchise and that consignment agreements were not permitted under franchise rules. Law and Gorman have disputed this claim, releasing images of their former franchising contract on Reddit, which states that the "franchisees may offer 'consignment services'"

=== Valuation ===
The parties dispute the precise valuation of the collection. Bryan Mansell estimated its value at $150,000 to $200,000. In a November 2023 post announcing the consignment deal, the BAM Salem-Keizer Facebook page promoted the collection as being "estimated to be worth well over $200,000." In a June 2026 interview, Chrystal Law-Gorman stated that the initial estimate was made during a walkthrough of the Mansell collection before she had fully examined the sets. YouTuber Coffeezilla (Stephen Findeisen) interviewed the parties involved and appraised the collection at approximately $107,000.

BAM initially claimed that the collection was only worth between $60,000 and $80,000. On June 4, BAM published a statement that "both parties' own records place the realistic high-end value at approximately $95,000–$100,000."

== Reckless Ben investigation ==
External videos
- Original investigation and follow up content
- I tracked down the thief who stole $200,000 of LEGO (investigation, part 1)
- I got Bricks and Minifigs leaked Email
- Bricks and Minifigs responded to my video
- I got arrested because of legos (investigation, part 2)
- My response to the Police
- All the footage is released!
- My final message
- Bricks and Minifigs Tried to Get Me Arrested to Stop This Video (investigation, part 3)
- They Tried to Put Me Back in Jail
- I took over Bricks and Minifigs (investigation, part 4)

The dispute gained wider attention in May 2026, when Benjamin Schneider, known on social media as Reckless Ben, published a YouTube video series investigating BAM. As part of his investigation, Schneider carried out a series of publicity stunts, including organizing lottery-style raffles and creating a mock rival business called "We Steal From Old People." These videos include allegations that corporate personnel involved in terminating the franchise agreement had ties to the incoming operators; such allegations have not yet been adjudicated in court, largely because of Schneider's difficulties in bringing suit against BAM.

Schneider shows that the current franchise owners initially offered to return the Lego sets to Mansell if he issued an apology, though they have reportedly not been returned. Schneider subsequently sued the company, though the Keizer franchisee store permanently closed soon after. He also set up a GoFundMe to raise back the money lost by Mansell. As of June 8, 2026, the GoFundMe has raised over $445,000; Schneider announced that he would put the donations in a legal trust to help Mansell pay his legal fees. On May 28, 2026, an internal crisis management email allegedly sent to BAM franchises was leaked and subsequently read on social media by Schneider. On September 12, Schneider opened his own LEGO resale store in Tucson, Arizona in a former BAM location. On November 10, Schneider and One Big Sip Games released a video game titled We Steal from Old People: The Game where players are tasked with stealing bricks from elderly people.

== Company response ==
As of August 2026, the BAM website has posted six blog posts covering the situation. CEO Ammon McNeff appeared on a livestream interview on May 29, 2026. He stated that BAM Franchising was not involved in the disputed consignment agreement and argued that responsibility rested with parties directly involved in the original transaction.

On May 30, 2026, BAM filed a lawsuit accusing Schneider, Mansell, and others of coordinating a harassment and extortion campaign against its franchise owners in Utah and Oregon, using the state's RICO statute.

On June 4, 2026, BAM claimed that the Salem, Oregon, store would be permanently closed as part of a supposed mutual agreement to part ways with franchise owners Brandon Best and Joshua Johnson. The company also stated that they had contacted Mansell and his family regarding restitution. Best, however, still owns the franchise in Eugene, Oregon. As of August 2026, BAM announced it had reached a "comprehensive and amicable resolution" with the Mansell family, who are claimed in a BAM blog post to have "been compensated by BAM for the losses associated with their consignment arrangement and thus are releasing all their legal claims against BAM." Likewise, BAM is supposedly dropping their lawsuit against Bryan Mansell. However, as of that date, Mansell was still listed as a co-defendant in the lawsuit and mediation with Schneider was reportedly still ongoing. On September 2, Bryan announced that BAM had returned his Lego sets on a livestream.

== Police response ==
External videos
- Bricks and Minifigs/Benjamin Schneider Media Release

Additionally, Schneider claimed to have faced legal troubles in Utah, where he was arrested twice after visiting Johnson at his home in American Fork. One of the visits was an attempt to serve Johnson with legal papers. Schneider alleged that the American Fork Police Department searched his vehicles for drugs. He also alleged that an officer dislocated his shoulder during one of the arrests.

On March 10, 2026, Schneider was formally charged with stalking and residential targeted picketing, as well as disorderly conduct and trespassing after multiple alleged stunts at the home of Johnson. These stunts included posing as a United Parcel Service delivery driver in an attempt to obtain Johnson's signature, having a confederate pretend to be a member of Johnson's church, and hanging a sign alleging that Johnson had "stole a dying man's life savings" onto a neighbor's fence. Schneider was scheduled to appear in court on July 1, 2026. A second arrest occurred the following day, on March 11, with a judge-approved search warrant to search the Airbnb at which Schneider was staying to arrest Schneider and search for stolen Lego. Schneider and four of his associates were arrested, with everyone but Schneider later released.

On May 29, 2026, the American Fork Police Department published a news release stating that there were no active warrants for Schneider in Utah and that they were not currently seeking him. In the news release, the police also shared videos captured from the body cameras worn by its officers during their interactions with the parties involved. Portions of the videos were either wholly redacted or had audio redacted. Keizer Police of Marion County, Oregon confirmed an ongoing investigation reviewed by the Marion County District Attorney's Office, and civil litigation related to the dispute was reported to be ongoing. Schneider posted a rebuttal of the police response on June 1, accusing them of having obfuscated the reason for his arrest.

On June 3, a Reddit user claimed to have discovered unredacted body camera and dashcam footage of events, which they said had been shared via a public Dropbox link attached to a YouTube video from the American Fork Police Department. Schneider asserted this footage had been released due to a "hack", but the AFPD says it released the footage accidentally. Reddit discussions claimed that the police department had deleted the files soon after their release.

On June 10, 2026, Schneider received a gag order preventing him from posting and talking any further about BAM. The gag order was later "relaxed", allowing Schneider to post videos, resume investigations, and publish court proceedings. However, he would still be barred from making threats against BAM, "engag[ing] in property destruction, stalking or trespassing; publish[ing] personal contact information; go[ing] within 100 yards of the Bricks and Minifigs offices, stores and its owners; impersonat[ing] anyone to get a signature or recordings; defac[ing] any signs; block[ing] any customers or solicit employees of Bricks and Minifigs to get confidential information", which Schneider agreed to. Schneider and BAM have also reportedly agreed to mediate their dispute in order to avoid a public "trial" or "lawsuit". On July 7, the order was lifted; Schneider posted part 3 of his investigation a day later. Schneider's lawyer, Scott Young, also filed a motion to move the case into federal court.

== Reactions ==
The controversy has attracted attention from YouTubers, legal commentators, journalists, and news organizations. Commentary channels such as MoistCr1tikal and xQc have criticized BAM and the American Fork Police Department's response to the controversy. Tara Strong, the voice actor for several characters in the animated Star Wars franchise, said Bricks and Minifigs should "do the right thing, and give the Legos back". She likened Schneider to the character of Batman, saying that she believed he was doing the right thing. On July 7, Courtney Love posted an Instagram post celebrating the lifting of Schneider's court order.

On June 3, 2026, Patreon CEO Jack Conte announced in a YouTube video that BAM had sent them a legal notice to shut down Schneider's Patreon account. He said: "Bricks & Minifigs can stuff it. We are keeping Ben's page up. And if Bricks & Minifigs doesn't like that, they can sue us."

Commentators observed that Bricks & Minifigs inadvertently triggered the Streisand effect—an attempt to censor yields the unintended consequence of increasing awareness of a topic.

The controversy also affected neighboring police departments that have no involvement in the dispute; dispatchers reported receiving a high volume of calls about the case, potentially delaying emergency responses, with some callers being abusive and harassing. On June 4, a locally owned and operated BAM franchise in Sacramento, California, announced that it would close for at least a week beginning June 13, with plans to reopen on June 19, due to alleged harassment, including death threats, in connection to the dispute. Another franchise based in San Luis Obispo, California, also reported receiving calls. The BAM corporate office indicated that the backlash from this controversy had extended to various franchise locations nationwide. Schneider opposed harassment, saying that "no one should be getting harassment at all. Not even the bad guys."

In June, Schneider's supporters accused the AFPD of misconduct during a city council meeting in American Fork. On June 20, Schneider joined a protest that proceeded from a downtown park to the police station.

In July 2026, former Keizer franchise co-owners Benjamin Gorman and Chrystal Law filed a civil lawsuit against Bricks & Minifigs in Utah Business and Chancery Court, alleging fraud, breach of contract, and defamation, stemming from the seizure of their franchise that took place in November 2024.
