= Sam White Bridge =

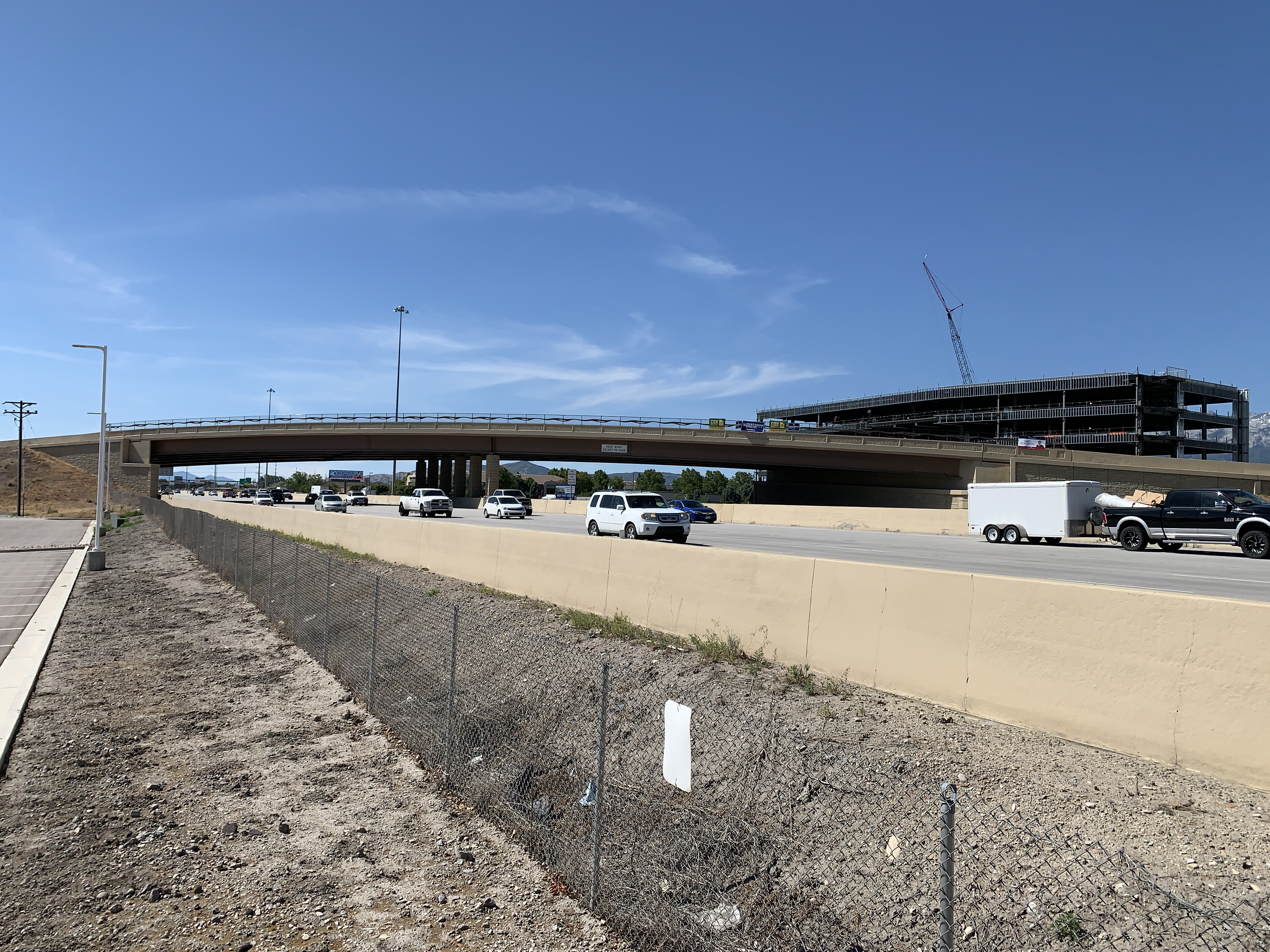
- The Sam White Bridge from the south.
- Coordinates: 40°21′19″N 111°46′39″W
- Carries: Vehicle traffic
- Crosses: I-15
- Locale: American Fork, Utah
- Owner: Utah Department of Transportation
- Maintained by: Utah Department of Transportation

Characteristics
- Material: Steel, reinforced concrete
- Total length: 354 feet (108 m)
- Width: 76 feet 10 inches (23.42 m)
- Longest span: 177 feet (54 m)
- No. of spans: Two
- Clearance below: 17 feet 3 inches (5.26 m)

History
- Constructed by: Provo River Constructors
- Construction start: August 2010
- Construction end: May 2011
- Opened: May 2011
- Replaces: Sam White Bridge

Location
- Interactive map of Sam White Bridge

The Sam White Bridge is a reinforced concrete and steel overpass beam bridge which crosses Interstate 15 in American Fork, Utah. The original bridge was named for Sam White, a former homesteader in the nearby city of Pleasant Grove. It had only 14 feet 7 inches (4.45 m) underpass clearance. The new bridge has an underpass clearance of 17 feet 3 inches (5.26 m), which exceeds the minimum standard for interstate bridges in the United States.

The new 354-foot, 3.82-million-pound (1.73-million-kg, 1910-short-ton, 1733-tonne) bridge was built on the side of the interstate—500 feet (150 m) from its final location—in order to reduce traffic impact. It was then moved into place over a five-hour period using self-propelled modular transporters, finishing the process three hours ahead of schedule. It is the longest two-span bridge to be moved in the Western Hemisphere, and the second longest in the world to be moved.

The Utah Department of Transportation, state and federal transportation and construction officials from around the United States, as well as some from other countries, were present to view it being moved into place. An area of a nearby business park was set aside for the public to watch the bridge being moved into place.
