= American Fork Cemetery Rock Wall =

Historic structure in Utah County, Utah

- U.S. National Register of Historic Places
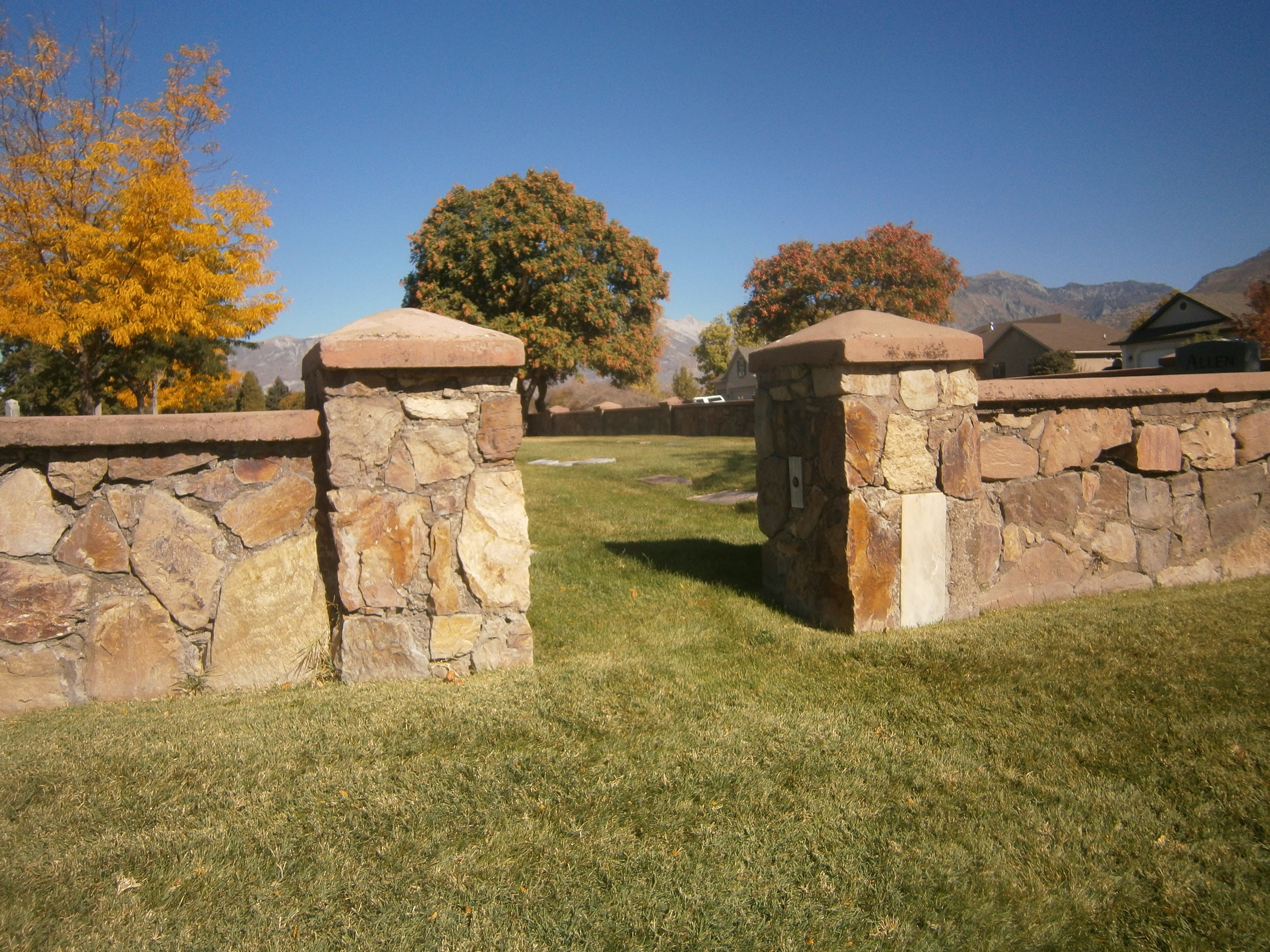

- Location within Utah Location within the United States
- Location: 600 North 100 East; American Fork, Utah; United States
- Coordinates: 40.389754°N 111.79594°W
- Area: less than one acre
- Built: 1937, 1938
- Built by: Works Progress Administration
- NRHP reference No.: 94001207
- Added to NRHP: October 7, 1994

The American Fork Cemetery Rock Wall on North 100 East in American Fork, Utah, United States, was built in 1937 and 1938. It was a work of the Works Progress Administration. It was listed on the National Register of Historic Places in 1994.

The south wall is 923 feet long and the east wall is 817 feet long, ignoring breaks for entrances.

== See also ==
- National Register of Historic Places listings in Utah County, Utah
