= Joseph Forbes (educator) =

Joseph B. Forbes
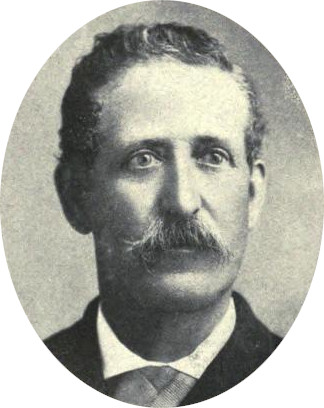
- Born: January 29, 1840; Bangor, Maine
- Died: May 5, 1927 (aged 87); Goshen, Idaho
- Known for: Schoolteacher in American Fork, Utah

Joseph Barlow Forbes (January 29, 1840 – May 5, 1927) was an American educator. He started the first free public school system in Utah, and organized one of the first public high schools.

== Early years ==
Forbes was born January 29, 1840, in Bangor, Maine. His family later moved to Boston, where he was educated. His parents encouraged him to become a doctor and educated him to that purpose, but his goals were for the sea. In his early twenties he sailed to Calcutta on the family-owned Pocahontas. After arriving in Calcutta, he became first mate on a different ship going to Southern Europe.

Upon his return to Boston he found the nation in the midst of a Civil War. He enlisted in Company H, Second Maine Volunteers on April 26, 1861, for six months. As a lieutenant, he fought in Bull Run, the Peninsular Campaign, Antietam, and Chancellorsville. He was a second lieutenant when his service ended on June 9, 1863.

The following year he sailed to California, where he accepted a commission as "assistant adjutant-general, with the rank of major" under John Bidwell. He and a fellow officer left the Army in 1865 to return to the Eastern United States by land, with a side trip through Salt Lake City, where he met Brigham Young. While they were Young's guests, Young suggested they use their education to help the Mormons set up schools. They rejected that idea and headed south from Salt Lake City.

In American Fork, Forbes met Nancy Dayton, whose stepfather, Isaac Cooper, ran a boarding house. He stayed at Cooper's boarding house and taught school there. While Forbes was in American Fork, Leonard E. Harrington asked him to organize the schools there, which he did. Harrington helped pass laws to enable the public school system Forbes envisioned. Forbes separated students into grades. A new brick school building, called the Forbes School, was built in American Fork in 1892. Forbes spent 46 years teaching in American Fork and eight years teaching at the Latter Day Saints' college in Salt Lake City and in Riverdale, Utah, and Conejos County, Colorado.

== Mormon years ==
In 1866, Forbes married Nancy Dayton, followed by his conversion to the Church of Jesus Christ of Latter-day Saints, to which he was committed the remainder of his life. Forbes and Dayton had thirteen children together. In their first ten years of marriage, Nancy gave birth to ten children and was deeded a farm from her stepfather. They were supported financially by his teaching and her midwifery.

In 1879, Forbes married a second wife, Mary Jane Gardner, with whom he had eleven children. He devoted equal time to both wives. In 1887 with the passage of the Edmunds-Tucker Act, plural marriage became a crime, and Forbes was forced into hiding. Eventually he was arrested and detained in the penitentiary in Salt Lake City until he signed a document indicating his intention to consider himself married only to his first wife. When Mary Jane had another baby, Forbes was at risk of being arrested for cohabitation a second time. The family decided that Forbes would take Mary Jane and her children to Sanford, Colorado. About a year later, at Joseph's insistence, Nancy moved there as well. Since polygamy was not accepted there, she moved over the border to New Mexico. One of Forbes' students in Colorado was the future boxing champion Jack Dempsey. When Wilford Woodruff issued the Manifesto ending polygamy, the Forbes returned to American Fork. Forbes died in 1927 at age 87.

== Legacy ==
In 1921, the citizens of American Fork honored Forbes for his long service to the community. April 15, 1921 was designated Forbes Day, and the original plan for a dinner and social event turned into a true holiday, with businesses and schools closed. Forbes and his two wives participated in a parade with the local band. Speeches were given. Forbes thanked the residents for their love and returned it, then declared the meeting his funeral: that he was now ready to die and "face my Maker unafraid, and with joy in my heart". Forbes died on May 5, 1927. The Deseret News reported in his obituary that he "had been a teacher for 54 years continuously, 46 years in this community [American Fork], where three generations attended his schools, a record probably unparalleled in the history of education in the west".

Forbes established the school system in American Fork. Two schools in American Fork were named after him. In 1960, one was no longer in use. One was established in 1949.

== In literature ==
Forbes' grandson Paul Dayton Bailey wrote extensively about his grandfather in Grandpa Was a Polygamist (1960), which was later reprinted as Polygamy Was Better Than Monotony (1973).

== Bibliography ==
- Bailey, Paul Dayton (1973). Polygamy Was Better than Monotony. Los Angeles: Westernlore Press.
- Bailey, Paul Dayton (1960). Grandpa Was a Polygamist. Los Angeles: Westernlore Press.
