= Grant Liddle =

American endocrinologist (1921–1989)

- Born: Grant Winder Liddle; June 27, 1921; American Fork, Utah, U.S.
- Died: June 29, 1989 (aged 68); Nashville, Tennessee, U.S.
- Education: University of Utah; University of California, San Francisco
- Occupation: Endocrinologist
- Scientific career
- Fields: Endocrinology

Grant Winder Liddle (June 27, 1921 – June 29, 1989) was an American endocrinologist whose research focused largely on the hypothalamic–pituitary–adrenal axis. He was a professor at Vanderbilt University and chaired its Department of Medicine from 1968 to 1983.

== Biography ==
Liddle was born on June 27, 1921, in American Fork, Utah. He attended the University of Utah, graduating in 1943, before moving to California to attend the UCSF School of Medicine. After graduating in 1948, he became a research fellow at the National Institutes of Health Metabolic Research Unit. From 1953 to 1956, he worked as a surgeon for the Section on Clinical Endocrinology at the National Heart, Lung, and Blood Institute. He left to join the faculty of the Vanderbilt University School of Medicine as chief of the school's Endocrine Service, and was appointed chairman of Vanderbilt's Department of Medicine in 1968. He held that role until 1983, when he had a stroke while driving and sustained numerous fractures from the crash. He died on June 29, 1989, in Nashville, Tennessee.

== Research ==
Liddle published 223 research papers throughout his career. Much of his research focused on the hypothalamic–pituitary–adrenal axis and diseases that can affect it. He was the first to show that Cushing's disease was caused primarily by an abnormality in the anterior pituitary rather than the adrenal glands. He also described Liddle's syndrome, a genetic syndrome causing high blood pressure. Liddle developed the dexamethasone suppression test for assessing adrenal function and the metyrapone test for pituitary reserve. He discovered a method for measuring aldosterone levels in urine and pioneered the use of spironolactone in the treatment of high blood pressure. He also discovered that certain cancers, especially of the lungs, can secrete ACTH, producing a paraneoplastic Cushing's syndrome. Based on his research into paraneoplastic syndromes, he coined the term "ectopic hormone secretion".

== Awards and honors ==
Liddle was elected to the National Academy of Sciences in 1981. He received the Endocrine Society's Distinguished Leadership Award in 1971 and the American College of Physicians' John Phillips Memorial Award in 1977. In 1983, the Vanderbilt University Medical Center established the Grant W. Liddle Award in his honor.
