= Courts of Utah =

Courts of Utah include:

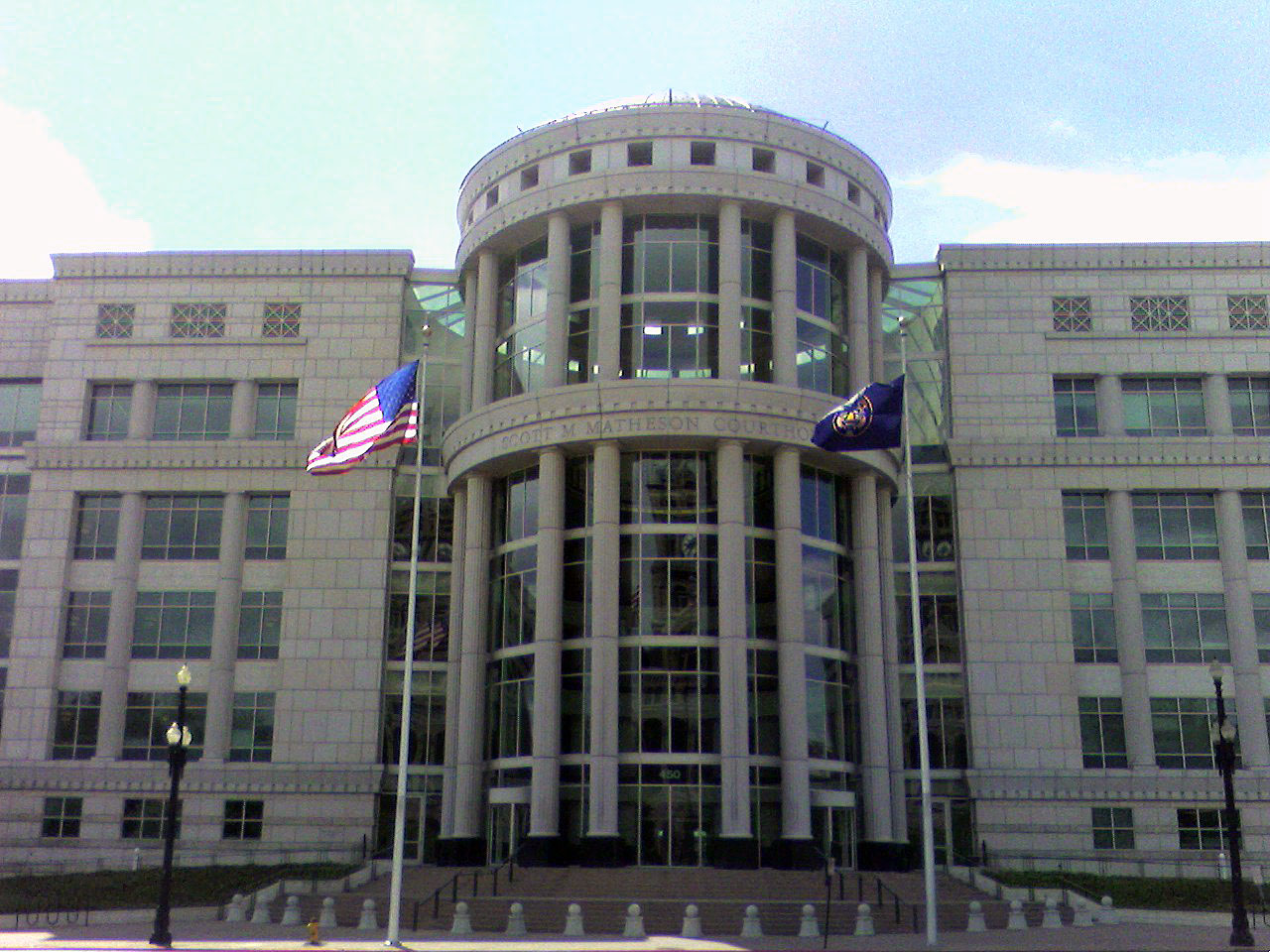
The Utah Supreme Court meets in the Scott M. Matheson Courthouse.

State courts of Utah

- Utah Supreme Court
  - Utah Court of Appeals
    - Utah District Courts (8 districts)
    - Utah Business and Chancery Court
    - Utah Juvenile Courts
    - Utah Justice Courts

Federal courts located in Utah

- United States District Court for the District of Utah
