= American Fork Third Ward Meetinghouse =

Historic church in Utah, United States

- U.S. National Register of Historic Places
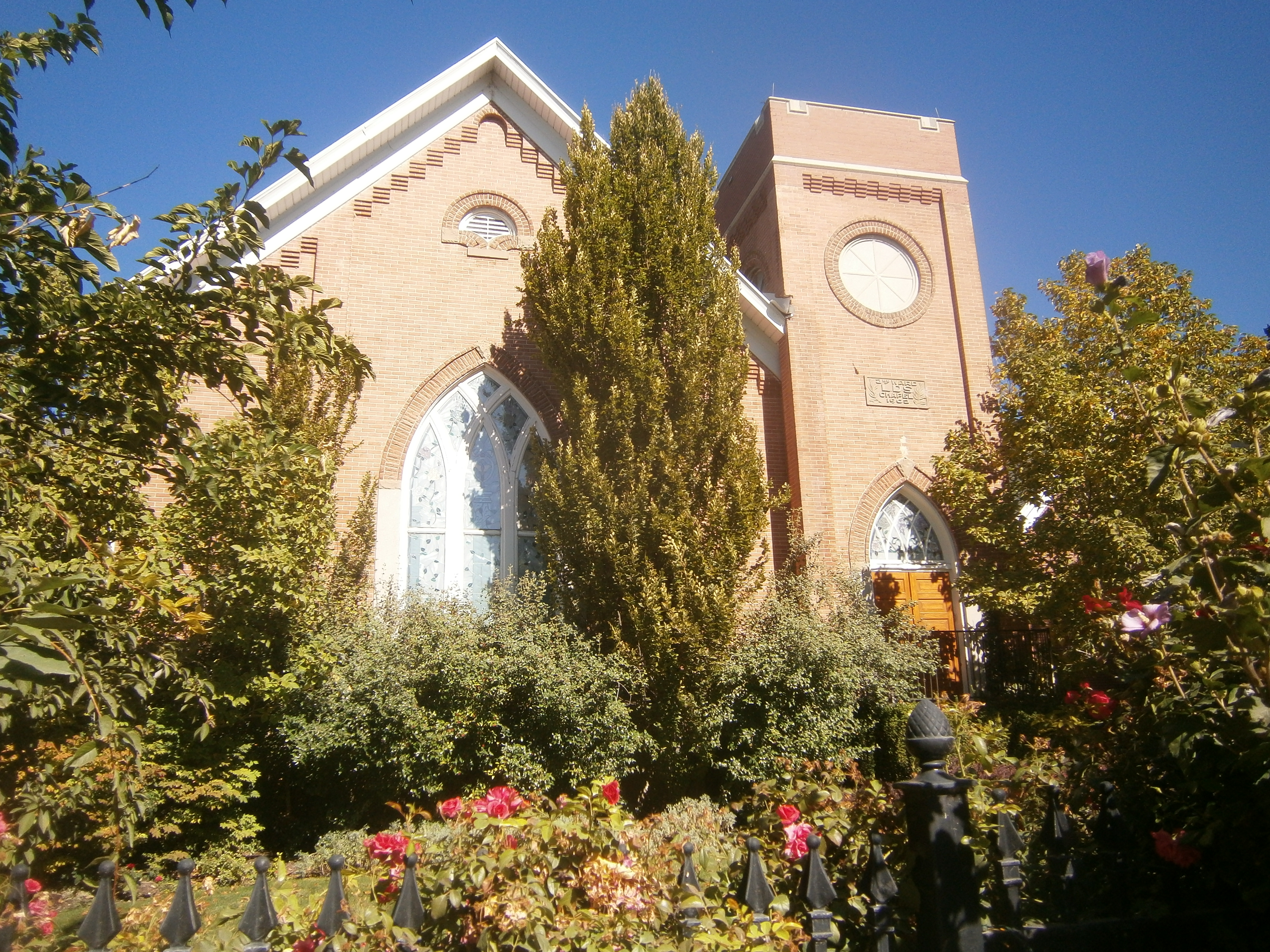

- Location within Utah Location within the United States
- Location: 198 W 300 N, American Fork, Utah
- Coordinates: 40°23′1″N 111°48′9″W
- Area: 1 acre (0.40 ha)
- Built: 1903-1905; 1938; 1958
- Architectural style: Gothic Revival, Late 19th and 20th Century Revivals
- MPS: Mormon Church Buildings in Utah MPS
- NRHP reference No.: 02001554
- Added to NRHP: December 20, 2002

The American Fork Third Ward Meetinghouse is a historic Gothic Revival building with Jacobethan Revival decorative elements located on West 300 North in American Fork, Utah. Built from 1903 to 1905, it operated as a meetinghouse for members of the Church of Jesus Christ of Latter-day Saints until 1994. It was expanded with the addition of wings in 1938 and in 1958. The building was sold to the Briar Rose Preschool in 1994 and remodeled for use as a school. In 1991, the building was sold to the Chapel Hill Academy. The building was sold again in 2001 and renovated as the Northampton Reception Center. The building was listed on the National Register of Historic Places in 2002.

== See also ==
- American Fork Second Ward Meetinghouse
