= Paul Dayton Bailey =

American novelist (1906–1987)

Paul Dayton Bailey (July 12, 1906 – October 26, 1987) was the owner/publisher of Westernlore Press and a writer of many books himself that focused on the Western American experience and, in particular, Latter-day Saint history.

== Early years ==
Bailey was the son of Eli and Olive Bailey and the grandson of Joseph Forbes. He was raised in American Fork, Utah until the age of 13 when his father went to Grants Pass, Oregon to take part in the building of a new sugar beet-processing factory for the Utah-Idaho Sugar Company. As Eli helped build the factory, he sent letters and money home, finally persuading his family to join him.

The family did not stay in Oregon long. Utah-Idaho failed to persuade local farmers to pick up the new crop and, two summers later, Eli was put in charge of dismantling the factory and loading it upon rail cars for reassembly in Yakima Valley, Washington. The family, which had always been poor, grew more impoverished with each move, and the Yakima venture did not pull them out.

The factory was not reassembled in time for the first year's (bumper) crop, and before the second year's crop could be processed, World War I ended, dropping sugar prices to what Bailey would later describe as "catastrophic lows". The lowered prices were accompanied by a disease called "curly top" which reduced the previously enormous Washington yields to industry-killing scarcity.

The Bailey family responded to the death of sugar with a disastrous attempt at potato farming in Washington, after which young Bailey ran away, back home to American Fork, where he set up residence with his maternal grandfather Joseph Barlow Forbes and his first wife—Bailey's grandmother—Nancy. Living with them meant Bailey was not allowed to drop out of school and work as he had intended.

A year after his return to American Fork, his mother and his siblings also returned. Eli moved to Idaho Falls, Idaho to be foreman at a UISC factory there. Although Eli sent checks to his family, Bailey finally did drop out of school to help support his mother, who would soon divorce Eli, at which point Bailey left home for good with a move to Salt Lake City.

Supporting himself with odd jobs, Bailey put himself through Henager's Business College and LDS Business College. While working at the county hospital as a night orderly, Bailey met Evelyn Robison. Shortly after impulsively kissing her and getting slapped in return, he moved to California and she returned to her hometown due to illness.

== Early writing career ==
Shortly after arriving in Los Angeles, Bailey began work as an apprentice typographer. While working in newspapers, he remet Robison, who was working again at becoming a registered nurse. They were soon married, which resulted in her expulsion from General Hospital's School of Nursing. It was the eve of the Great Depression.

Evelyn undertook secretarial training at Metropolitan College. Bailey's typographic work kept him busy and well employed throughout the Depression. However, he had developed a desire to write. He fed that need initially with fact-based, usually historical articles, including a serialized study of Samuel Brannan, published in the LDS periodicals Era and Millennial Star, and, later, with much success, in book form. This began a string of successes with Church-owned publications, such as his novel For This My Glory; about the Mormon Battalion. His books were popular in Utah and even used as Sunday School texts.

Meanwhile, he had taken reporting jobs at the Los Angeles Record and Hollywood Citizen, followed by a sudden opportunity to purchase the Eagle Rock Advertiser, one of two newspapers in Eagle Rock, a small town outside of Los Angeles. The paper was on the verge of collapse, but since he had both editorial and typographical preparation, Bailey was able to keep costs down and eventually turn the Advertiser into Eagle Rock's premier paper. Evelyn, for her part, drummed up additional advertising revenue.

== World War II ==
World War II brought on serious paper-rationing with smaller newspapers were powerless to work around. While larger LA-area papers were able to purchase Canadian pulp mills to keep in paper, smaller papers were forced to print fewer pages less frequently. The Baileys were particularly frustrated because during those boom years, the advertising available was much more than they had paper to print upon.

To supplement income, Bailey took a job reorganizing and running the Lockheed Aircraft Corporation's Lockheed Star, printing five separate editions for the five separate factories in the Burbank area.

Also during the war years, Bailey started Westernlore Press to reprint classic texts on the Western United States, whose rarity prevented most interested libraries from purchasing copies. To his surprise, this venture was eased by the War Production Board's far less stringent requirements for acquiring book paper. The books published by Westernlore—on the same presses used by the Advertiser—were immediate successes and every edition sold out.

During this time, Bailey also found time to write three new books. The first, a fictionalized version of his Samuel Brannan biography, and the second (also a novel) were "enthusiastically received by the Saints." The third, Jacob Hamblin, Buckskin Apostle, became a source of controversy. Bailey received angry responses from LDS leadership and the Hamblin family—in large part because his book dealt with Hamblin's marriages to two Indian women and two white women, and the Mountain Meadows massacre.

The end of the war saw larger corporations buying up impoverished smaller papers and forcing the others out of business. The Advertiser was one of the few, hardy small papers that survived the war rationing, only to be forced out of business by larger corporations shortly thereafter.

== Later life ==
Bailey ran Westernlore until 1973, when its inventory was lost in a fire and his son Lynn moved the company to Tucson, Arizona. During the years he ran it, Westernlore continued to publish books focused on the Western United States that were highly regarded by libraries and well purchased. Westernlore published some of Bailey's own work, but his better known books were published by larger companies.

Many of his later books proved, to his and his publishers' surprise, to be controversial. For instance, For Time and All Eternity—a book about the anti-polygamy crusade in the 1890s—caused a small uproar among the Utah faithful (although, according to Samuel W. Taylor, "Bailey . . . [said the uproar] resulted from the objections of one man to a single passage in the book"), as did his book on Zion's Camp, the Missouri Contingent, the Nauvoo Legion and the Mormon Battalion— The Armies of God. Bailey believed the book was "a warm, honest appraisal of Mormon heroism in conquering the West" and his publisher had arranged for numerous interviews and signings in Utah; however, in the end the book was never so much as reviewed in the State.

Although estranged in many ways from Mormonism, Bailey always embraced that part of his heritage.

As a writer, the fact that I am steeped in Mormon lore, has been more hindrance than help to me. I've never been able to purge from my stubborn mind a conviction that the Mormon tale is one of the most unique and interesting human dramas in the annals of America. It has been my soaring wings; it has been my cement coffin".

Evelyn died in 1981. Bailey never remarried; he died in 1987. They were buried in Fillmore, Utah.

Many of his papers are held by the University of California, Los Angeles.

== Works ==
- Bailey, Paul (1948). Jacob Hamblin: Buckskin Apostle. Bookcraft. ISBN 1432546848.
- Bailey, Paul (1952). For this My Glory: A Story of a Mormon Life (Fourth ed.). Salt Lake City, UT: Bookcraft. "©1943"
- Bailey, Paul (1954). Walkara, Hawk of the Mountains. Los Angeles, CA: Westernlore Press.
- Bailey, Paul (1959). Sam Brannan and the California Mormons. Los Angeles, CA: Westernlore Press.
- Bailey, Paul (1960). Grandpa was a Polygamist: A Candid Remembrance. Los Angeles: Westernlore Press.
- Bailey, Paul (1964). For Time and All Eternity. Doubleday.
- Bailey, Paul (1966). The Claws of the Hawk: The Incredible Life of Wahker the Ute. Los Angeles, CA: Westernlore.
- Bailey, Paul (1968). The Armies of God: The Little-Known Story of the Mormon Militia on the American Frontier. Garden City, NY: Doubleday.
- Bailey, Paul (1971). City in the Sun: The Japanese Concentration Camp at Poston, Arizona. Los Angeles, CA: Westernlore Press.
- Bailey, Paul (1972). Polygamy was Better than Monotony. Los Angeles, CA: Westernlore Press.
- Bailey, Paul (1975). Those Kings and Queens of Old Hawaii: A Mele to Their Memory. Los Angeles: Westernlore Books. ISBN 0870260359.
- Bailey, Paul (1978). Holy Smoke: A Dissertation on the Utah War. Los Angeles: Westernlore Books. ISBN 0870260375.
- Bailey, Paul (1978). An Unnatural History of Death Valley: With Reflections on the Valley's Varmints, Virgins, Vandals, and Visionaries. Bishop, CA: Chalfant Press. ISBN 091249431X.
- Bailey, Paul (1986). Ghost Dance Messiah (Second ed.). Tucson, AZ: Westernlore Press. ISBN 0870260251.
