= American Fork Second Ward Meetinghouse =

Historic church in Utah, United States

- U.S. National Register of Historic Places
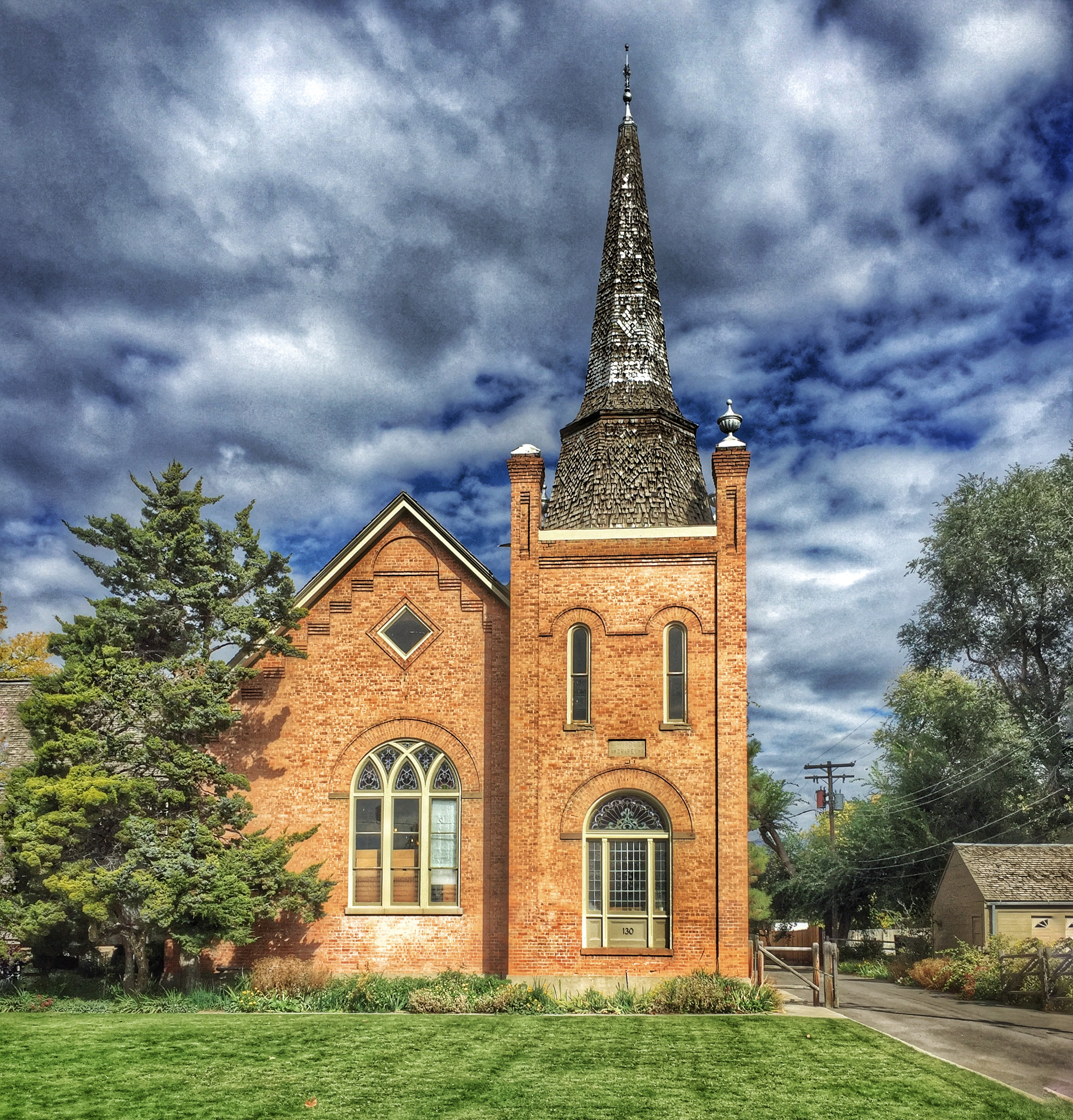

- Location within Utah Location within the United States
- Location: 130 W. 100 South, American Fork, Utah
- Coordinates: 40°22′32″N 111°48′5″W
- Area: 1 acre (0.40 ha)
- Built: 1903
- Built by: James H. Pulley; Young and Hansen
- Architectural style: Gothic, Eclectic
- NRHP reference No.: 92000101
- Added to NRHP: March 10, 1992

The American Fork Second Ward Meetinghouse is an eclectic Gothic Revival building on South Street in American Fork, Utah. Built from 1903 to 1904, it served as a meetinghouse for the Church of Jesus Christ of Latter-day Saints until 1982. It is believed that the building was designed by James H. Pulley, a local carpenter and builder. A large addition built in 1929 was designed by architects Young and Hansen of Salt Lake City. In 1984, the building was sold to Michael Bigelow. It became the home of Bigelow & Co. Organ Builders. It was listed on the National Register of Historic Places in 1992.

== See also ==
- American Fork Third Ward Meetinghouse, also NRHP-listed
