= McKamey Manor =

Haunted house attraction in Tennessee and Alabama

- Location: Summertown, Tennessee, United States
- Coordinates: 35.4179°N 87.2615°W
- Owner: Russ McKamey
- Website: mckameymanor.com

McKamey Manor is an American operation founded by Russ McKamey and based in Summertown, Tennessee. It has been described as an "extreme" haunted attraction and has drawn sustained controversy over participant safety, consent, and business practices.

Founded in San Diego, the attraction later relocated to Tennessee, with reports of a separate operation in the Huntsville, Alabama area in 2017. Elizabeth McCafferty has described it as evolving from an early family-oriented haunted home in San Diego into a more extreme, adult-focused format by the 2010s.

Coverage based on interviews with former participants has described the experience as resembling abuse or a "torture chamber" rather than a conventional haunted attraction. Participants are required to read aloud a lengthy liability waiver before beginning the experience, and the attraction has advertised a $20,000 prize for those who endure the full experience.

In 2023, the Tennessee Attorney General's office said it was reviewing complaints related to withdrawal of consent, waiver access, and advertised prize conditions. In 2024, McKamey was charged in a separate criminal case; those charges were later dropped, according to local reporting.

As of late 2024, reports were uncertain on the operation's current status and format. As of May 2026, the official McKamey Manor YouTube channel's recent uploads primarily consisted of karaoke-style videos by Russ McKamey rather than footage associated with the operation.

== Overview ==
Coverage describes the tour as a long-duration, physically demanding experience, with reported runtimes varying by period and format. Early reporting said safewords were not initially used, while later coverage reported that participants could end the tour; some former participants nevertheless alleged that attempts to stop were not immediately honored.

During the tour, employees of the Manor may physically assault patrons, waterboard them, force them to eat and drink unknown substances, have them bound and gagged, and engage in other forms of physical and psychological torture. Participants may also be drugged during their experience. Journalist Tara West has reported that in the communities where the tour is staged, residents question how it remains legal, even with waivers. In comments reported by WKRN, Lawrence County District Attorney Brent Cooper said the program was legal because participants consented, while noting that consent could be withdrawn under Tennessee law.

== Requirements ==
The list of requirements to go through with the experience is extensive and not completing or fulfilling any of the requirements will stop participants from being allowed to participate. The requirements include completing a sports physical, getting a doctor's note saying you are physically and mentally sound, passing a background check, showing proof of medical insurance, passing a drug test the day of, as well as being at least 18, with 18–20 years requiring parental approval, as well as a 40-page waiver. Participants must also comply with the rules which include no running, touching props or actors, using foul language, or pushing.

A volunteer guide testified that the 40-page waiver signed by participants listed such possible risks as having teeth extracted, being tattooed, and having fingernails removed.

In a self-published video, YouTuber Reckless Ben, whose real name is Ben Schneider, alleged that participants were required to sign a non-disclosure agreement with a stated $50,000 penalty clause; in the same video, McKamey is shown discussing that requirement.

In its early years, it was also required that dog food or funds for animal welfare be used as payment to participate. In recent years a monetary donation is recommended, but not mandatory.

== Controversies ==
According to participant Laura Hertz Brotherton, on a visit to the Manor in 2016, she repeatedly used her safeword for several minutes before employees stopped torturing her. She was later treated at a hospital for extensive injuries.

County Commissioner Scott Franks described an incident where deputies were called to the property after a neighbor saw a woman dragged screaming from a van as part of the experience: "Staged or not, this is simply something that none of us want anywhere near us." District Attorney Brent Cooper said the program was legal because people subjected themselves to it voluntarily, though participants could withdraw their consent at any time according to Tennessee law. In July 2017, Franks put a community alert on his Facebook in opposition to McKamey Manor, which had almost 600 comments, with most being opposed to the activity in Summertown.

Nashville Scene journalist Megan Seling has questioned many of the Manor's claims. "Here's the Thing: There is no $20,000," she wrote, saying that nobody has completed the tour by design. "No one has made it to the supposed Huntsville portion of the show. ... McKamey knows what will break people, and after stringing them along ... he can simply pull out what's needed to shut down the show when it's ready to end."

On October 31, 2023, Tennessee Attorney General Jonathan Skrmetti notified McKamey Manor that it was under investigation over concerns about its business practices and whether they might violate the state's consumer protection laws. Specific concerns include the allegations that withdrawn consent is not honored, lack of access to the waiver, and the inability for contestants to win the purported prize money. A tweet was made stating that a letter was sent raising these concerns about McKamey's business practices. In response, the official McKamey Manor account replied, "Haters gonna hate."

A few months after the investigation, McKamey filed a 32-page lawsuit against the Tennessee Attorney General, claiming the request violated his First, Fourth, Fifth, and Fourteenth Amendment rights. The lawsuit was ultimately dropped in August, yet McKamey's attorneys have asked the court to reconsider. McKamey later filed a lawsuit in April against Hulu and one of the participants included in their documentary. While Hulu was dismissed from the lawsuit, it is still ongoing against the participant who was interviewed.

== Media coverage ==
McKamey Manor was featured in the 2017 documentary film Haunters: The Art of the Scare, and on the Netflix original series Dark Tourist. It is also the subject of the 2023 Hulu documentary Monster Inside: America's Most Extreme Haunted House.

A critical series of videos on YouTube by Ben Schneider, on his Reckless Ben account, and accumulated millions of views. Schneider achieved widespread fame trying to shut down the manor, and became the legal owner of the company name. As stated by The Guardian, Ben discovered: "McKamey was now only operating a physical bootcamp in his front garden instead."
