= Reckless Ben =

American slackliner and YouTuber

- Schneider in 2026
- Born: Benjamin Paul Schneider; 1995 or 1996 (age 30–31); Fairfield, Ohio, U.S.
- Education: University of Cincinnati (dropped out)
- Occupations: Slackliner, YouTuber, independent filmmaker

Instagram information
- Page: recklessbenschneider
- Followers: 113 thousand

TikTok information
- Page: Reckless Ben
- Years active: 2019–present
- Followers: 577 thousand

YouTube information
- Channels: Reckless Ben; BenSchneider-b6v
- Years active: 2014–present
- Genres: Investigative documentaries, social experiments, commentary
- Subscribers: 2.55 million (main channel)
- Views: 162 million (main channel)
- Last updated: October 9, 2026

Benjamin Paul Schneider (born 1995 or 1996), better known as Reckless Ben, is an American YouTuber, independent filmmaker, entrepreneur, and slackliner. He is known for producing comedic investigative documentary videos about controversial organizations, businesses, internet personalities, and alleged scams.

== Early life ==
Benjamin Paul Schneider is from Fairfield, Ohio. During his teenage years, he became involved in slacklining, and graduated from Fairfield High School in 2014. He was a member of Boy Scout Troop 967 at Sacred Heart Church in Fairfield. He later studied engineering at the University of Cincinnati. While enrolled at the university, he continued participating in slacklining and began documenting many of his activities online. He dropped out of the university when he was three years into engineering school.

== Slacklining career ==
In 2018, at age 22, Schneider founded Ascending Slacklines, a company specializing in equipment for slacklining and highlining. In 2021, Schneider appeared on the television competition series Go-Big Show, where he broke the world record for most flips on a slackline in 60 seconds, and ended up doubling the record at 27. That same year, Schneider appeared on the Italian reality television program Tú sí que vales.

In 2024, Schneider attracted media coverage after filming himself walking a tightrope between two unfinished towers at Oceanwide Plaza in Los Angeles. The stunt prompted an investigation by the Los Angeles Police Department, and the video was subsequently removed from YouTube. Schneider wore a duck mask during a later visit to the area.

== Investigations ==
=== Banksy painting ===
In 2019, Schneider received media attention after claiming to have obtained a painting, rumored to be the work of street artist Banksy, from the Contemporary Arts Center in Cincinnati. The painting had been hung in the gallery without permission by a local artist who claimed to be acting on behalf of Banksy, and it was removed minutes later, being taken to the venue's lost and found. Schneider and two associates were able to claim the painting later that year after creating a fake eBay receipt suggesting that they owned the artwork.

=== Scientology ===
In 2020, Schneider and his collaborators created "Scientology Sucks", a project that has been officially recognized as a religious organization in the states of California and Oregon, specifically to protest the Church of Scientology. Schneider's project has documented the activity of the Church of Scientology and its utilization of a loophole with regard to beliefs stated by organizations.

=== McKamey Manor ===
In 2023, Schneider investigated McKamey Manor, an attraction marketed as an "extreme" haunted house experience, for its excessively violent treatment of participants. In his investigation, he alleged that a non-disclosure agreement containing a stated $50,000 penalty clause was mandated for all participants.

=== Lucifer Valentine ===
In 2025, Trilogy Media released a video by Schneider titled Exposing Hollywood's Most Sadistic Director on their streaming platform, TrilogyPlus, documenting an investigation by Schneider into the underground filmmaker Lucifer Valentine, believed to be an alias of Shawn Fedorchuk. He is known for the Vomit Gore Trilogy, and the investigation concerns alleged unsimulated acts of rape as pornography in his films.

=== Bricks & Minifigs ===
In 2026, Schneider created a series of videos concerning a dispute involving a large Lego collection and a franchise of Bricks & Minifigs (BAM). The videos alleged that corporate personnel involved in terminating the franchise agreement later had ties to the incoming operators; however, those allegations have not been adjudicated in court. On March 27, Schneider was charged with stalking, classified as a Class A misdemeanor, and targeted residential picketing, classified as a Class B misdemeanor. Schneider also alleged that he faced legal issues as a result of police corruption, including an incident in which he and members of his team were reportedly swatted in Utah. He further alleged that the franchise's operators, Brandon Best and Joshua Johnson, as well as Bricks & Minifigs chief executive Ammon McNeff, were large donors to the Church of Jesus Christ of Latter-day Saints. Schneider appeared on an episode of the H3 Podcast.

=== Provo Canyon School ===
In August 2026, Schneider released an undercover investigation of Provo Canyon School, a Utah residential treatment facility that had been the subject of longstanding allegations of abuse. Schneider posed as a 17-year-old prospective student, while one of his friends posed as a prospective employee. The video alleged problems including verbal and physical mistreatment of students, the use of isolation, inadequate education, and deficiencies in the facility's hiring practices.

== Filmography ==
=== Documentaries ===
Year	Title	Role	Ref.
2025	Trainwreck: Storm Area 51	Himself	

=== Television ===
Year	Title	Role	Notes	Ref.
2019	American Ninja Warrior	Himself	Season 11, Episode 6: "Cincinnati City Qualifiers"	
2019	Tosh.0	Himself	Season 11, Episode 6: "Burping Girl"	
2021	Go-Big Show	Himself	Season 1, Episode 4: "Danger, Danger Everywhere"	
2021	Tú sí que vales	Himself	Season 8, Episode 4	

=== Web series ===
Year	Title	Role	Notes	Ref.
2019	All Gas No Brakes	Himself	Episode: "The Raid of Area 51"	
2025	Exposing Hollywood's Most Sadistic Director	Himself	Investigation into the filmmaker Lucifer Valentine.	
