= Utah Business and Chancery Court =

In 2023, in the American state of Utah, the Utah Legislature (Senate and House of Representatives), unanimously passed statutory amendments creating a statewide business court, the Utah Business and Chancery Court, and Utah's governor signed it into law. The Business and Chancery Court became operational in October 2024.

== History of the Business and Chancery Court ==
Utah House Bill 216 creating the Business and Chancery Court was chiefly sponsored by Representative Brady Brammer. The final version of the bill was unanimously passed by the Utah Senate and House of Representatives, and was signed into law by the governor on March 20, 2023. The new court became operational on October 1, 2024. The Business and Chancery Court's creation was supported by the Utah State Bar. Utah Code § 78A-1-101, addressing courts of record in the state, added the Business and Chancery Court as one of Utah's courts of justice and courts of record, effective July 1, 2024.

== Nature and design of the Business and Chancery Court ==
The Business and Chancery Court is a specialized business court with limited, statewide, jurisdiction, concurrent with Utah's District Courts per Utah Code § 78A-5a-102. The statute setting out its jurisdiction, Utah Code § 78A-5a-103, lists certain case types of a business or commercial nature that fall within the court's jurisdiction, as well as case types that fall outside of its jurisdiction. In addition, to come within the Business and Chancery Court's jurisdiction, cases must have a minimum amount in controversy of $300,000 or seek equitable relief. Jury trials are not permitted in the Business and Chancery Court. If a defendant properly demands a jury trial, the case will be removed from the Business and Chancery Court.

The law creating the Business and Chancery Court provides for distinct judges and court administrators, with a physical location in Salt Lake City, Utah, but it can carry out its functions in any part of the state. The Business and Chancery Court judges are required to publish all final decisions and orders, and to make them publicly available on a website.

== Developments in establishing the Business and Chancery Court ==
Utah's Supreme Court established an Advisory Committee on the Rules of Business and Chancery Procedure, to develop rules of procedure for the Business and Chancery Court. A proposed set of Utah Rules of Business and Chancery Court Procedure was publicly posted on April 25, 2024, with a public comment period ending on June 9, 2024. A distinct Utah Rules of Business and Chancery Court Procedure became effective as of September 1, 2024.

On June 28, 2024, the governor's office announced the nominees for a judicial position on the Business and Chancery Court. On July 26, 2024, Governor Spencer Cox appointed Judge Rita Cornish as the Business and Chancery Court's first judge. At the time, Cox said Cornish's "unique experience in commercial litigation and as a judge on the Second District Court makes her ideally suited for this position”.
