= American Fork, Utah =

City in Utah, United States

American Fork
- City
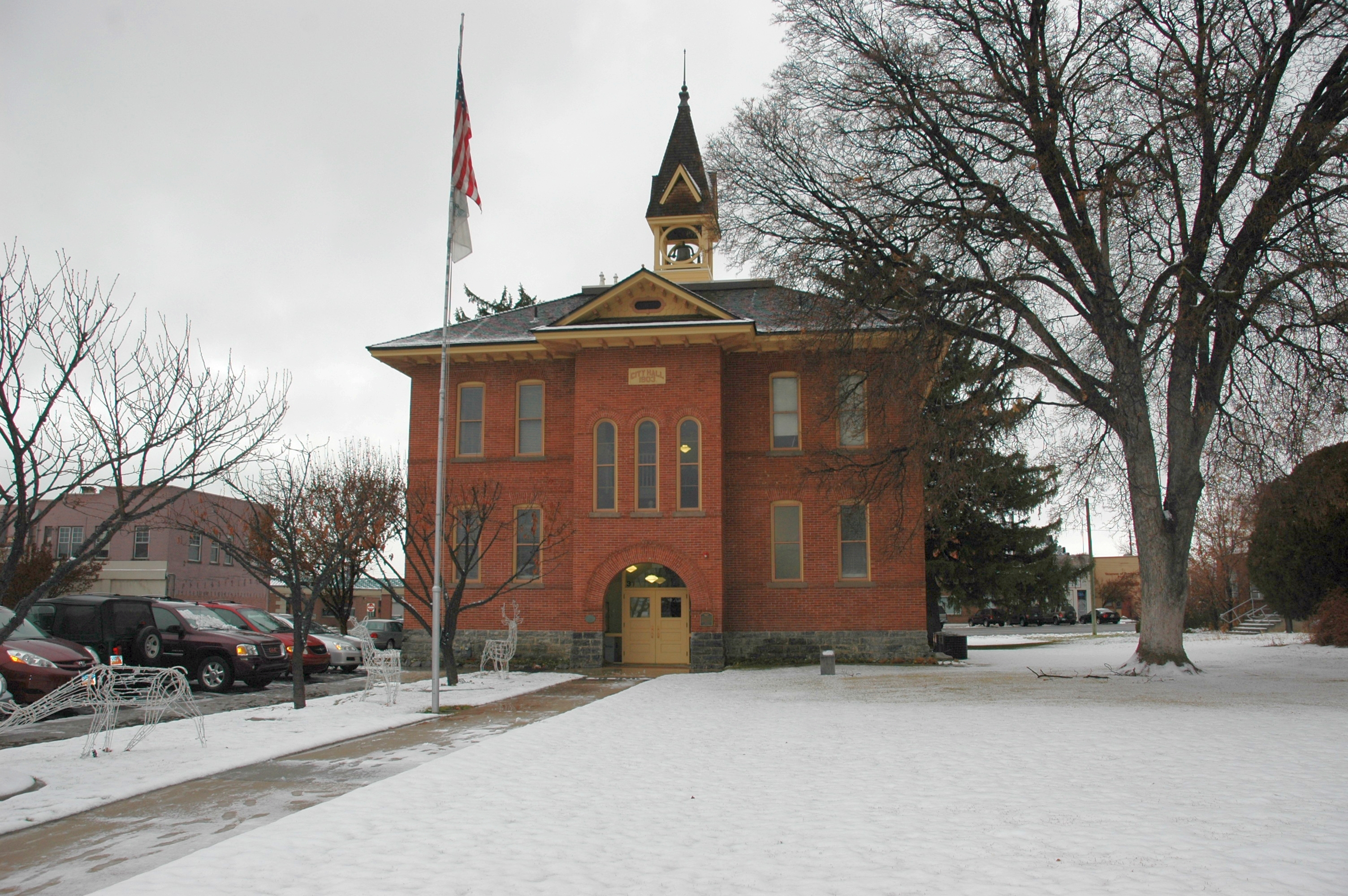
- The old city hall, which is on the National Register of Historic Places.

- Flag

- Location in Utah County and the state of Utah

- Location within Utah Location within the United States Location within North America
- Coordinates: 40°21′40″N 111°47′26″W
- Country: United States
- State: Utah
- County: Utah
- Settled: 1850
- Incorporated: June 4, 1853
- Named for: American Fork (river)

Area
  - Total: 11.16 sq mi (28.90 km^{2})
  - Land: 11.15 sq mi (28.87 km^{2})
  - Water: 0.0077 sq mi (0.02 km^{2})
- Elevation: 4,613 ft (1,406 m)

Population (2020)
  - Total: 33,337
  - Density: 2,990.7/sq mi (1,154.73/km^{2})
- Time zone: UTC−7 (MST)
  - Summer (DST): UTC−6 (MDT)
- ZIP code: 84003
- Area codes: 385, 801
- FIPS code: 49-01310
- GNIS feature ID: 2409697
- Website: www.americanfork.gov

American Fork is a city in north-central Utah County, Utah, United States, at the foot of Mount Timpanogos in the Wasatch Range, north from Utah Lake. The city is 32 miles (51 km) southeast of Salt Lake City and is part of the Provo–Orem Metropolitan Statistical Area. The population was 33,337 in 2020. The city has grown rapidly since the 1970s.

== History ==
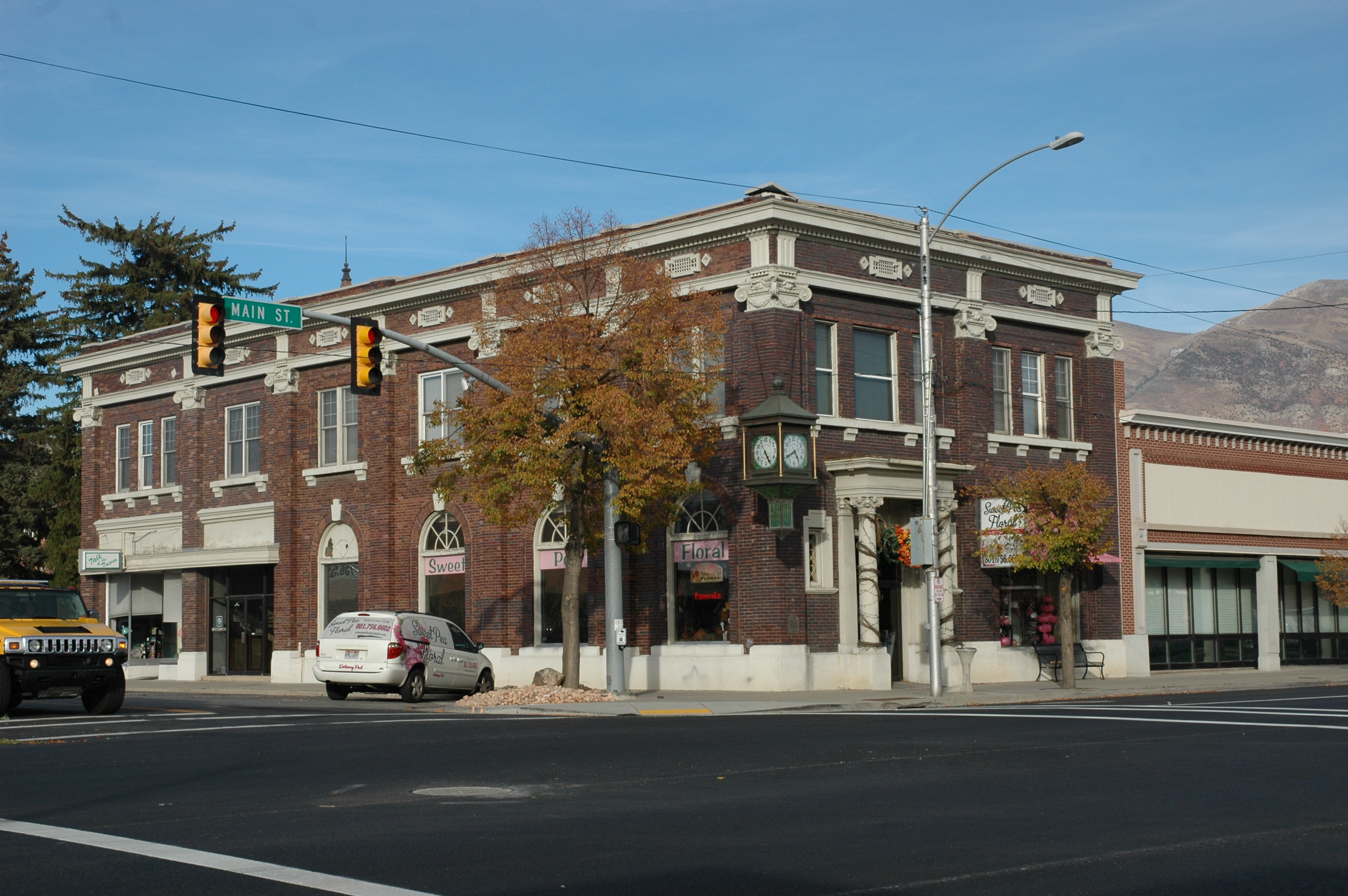
The former Bank of American Fork on Main Street

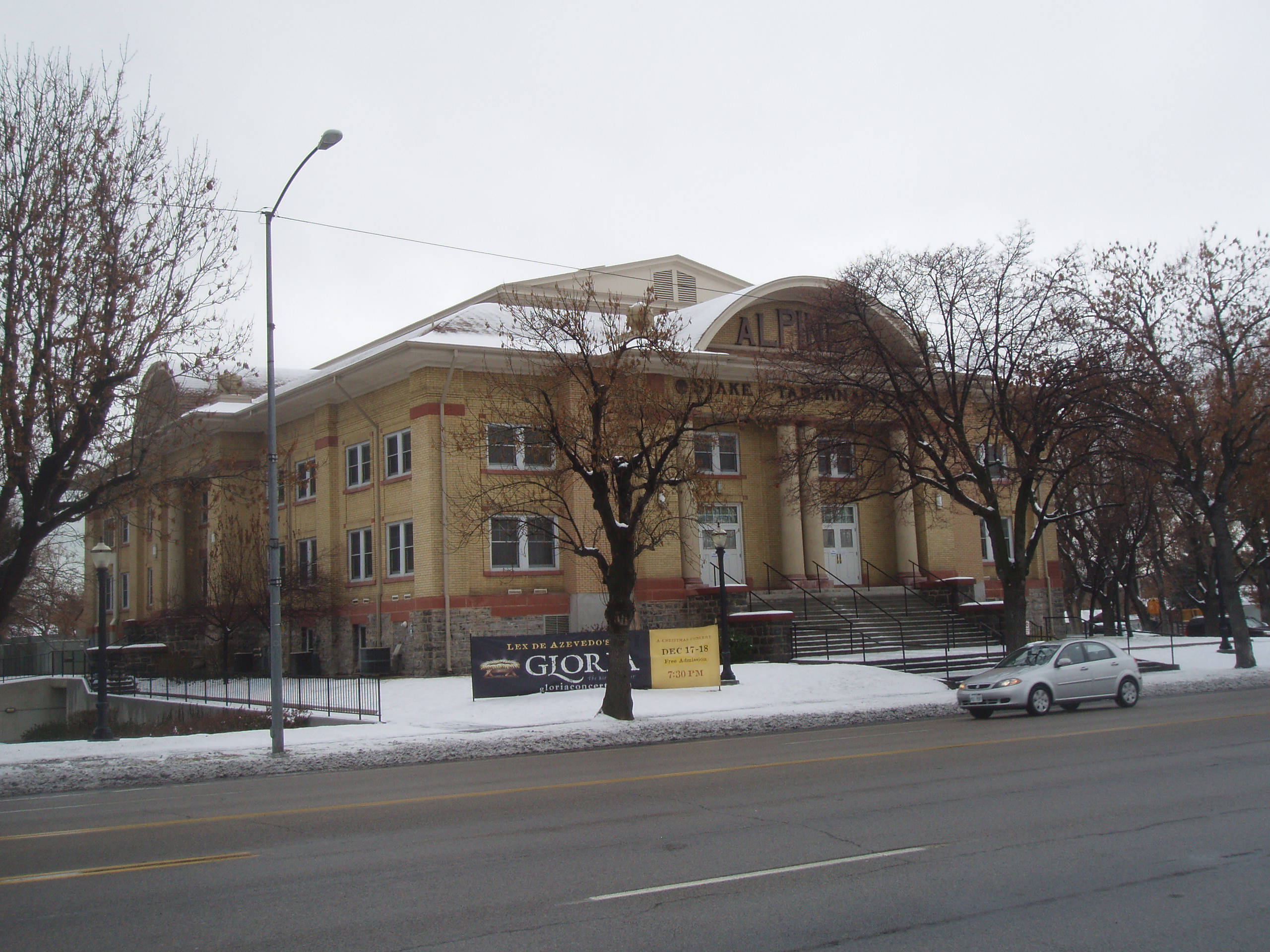
Alpine Stake Tabernacle in American Fork

The area around Utah Lake was used as a seasonal hunting and fishing ground by the Ute Indians. American Fork was settled in 1850 by Mormon pioneers and incorporated as Lake City in 1852. The first settlers were Arza Adams, followed by Stephen Chipman (grandfather of Stephen L. Chipman, a prominent citizen around the start of the 20th Century), Ira Eldredge, John Eldredge and their families.

The first settlers of American Fork lived in scattered conditions along the American Fork River. By the 1850s, the tension between the settlers and Native Americans was increasing. In 1853, Daniel H. Wells, the head of the Nauvoo Legion (the Utah Territorial Militia at the time), instructed settlers to move into specific forts. At a meeting on July 23, 1853, at the schoolhouse in American Fork, Lorenzo Snow and Parley P. Pratt convinced the settlers to follow Wells' directions and all move together into a central fort. A fort was built of 37 acres (150,000 m^{2}) to which the settlers located. Only parts of the wall were built to eight feet high, and none were built to the original plan of twelve feet high.

Settlers changed the name from Lake City to American Fork in 1860. It was renamed after the American Fork river, which runs through the city, to avoid confusion with Salt Lake City, about 30 miles to the north. Most residents were farmers and merchants during American Fork's early history. By the 1860s, American Fork had established a public school, making it the first community in the territory of Utah to offer public education to its citizens. In the 1870s, American Fork served as a rail access point for mining activities in American Fork Canyon. American Fork had "a literal social feud" with the town of Lehi due to the Utah Sugar Company choosing Lehi as the factory building site in 1890 instead of American Fork. There were several mercantile businesses in American Fork, such as the American Fork Co-operative Association and Chipman Mercantile. For several decades in the 1900s, raising chickens (and eggs) was an important industry in the city. In 1892, Joseph Forbes organized the schools in American Fork, and the Forbes school is named after him.

During World War II, the town population expanded when the Columbia Steel plant was built. An annual summer celebration in the city is still called "Steel Days" in honor of the economic importance of the mill, which closed in November 2001. The steel mill was located approximately six miles (10 km) southeast of town, on land on the east shore of Utah Lake.

American Fork built a city hospital in 1937. A new facility was built in 1950 and sold to Intermountain Healthcare in 1977, replacing that hospital with a new facility in 1980.

American Fork police attracted public attention in 2026 following allegations of corruption and criminal civil rights violations involving YouTuber Reckless Ben. The allegations arose from a dispute concerning claims that an elderly man had been defrauded of more than $200,000 by the Bricks & Minifigs Lego resale chain.

=== Religious history ===
The first ward of the Church of Jesus Christ of Latter-day Saints (LDS Church) in American Fork was organized in 1851 with Leonard E. Harrington as bishop. As of 2022, there are seven stakes headquartered in the city as well as Mount Timpanogos Utah Temple, which was dedicated in 1996.

While the majority of the population are members of the LDS Church, there are several other faith communities in the city. The Community Presbyterian Church of American Fork was organized in 1877. In 1973 St. Peter's Catholic Parish was organized in American Fork.

== Geography ==
Elevations throughout the city range from 4,566 feet (1,392 m) to 4,619 feet (1,408 m) above sea level.

According to the United States Census Bureau, the city has a total area of 9.2 square miles (23.9 km^{2}), all land.

== Demographics ==
Historical population
Census	Pop.	Note	%±
1870	1,115		—
1880	1,825		63.7%
1890	1,942		6.4%
1900	2,732		40.7%
1910	3,220		17.9%
1920	3,290		2.2%
1930	3,641		10.7%
1940	3,906		7.3%
1950	5,126		31.2%
1960	6,373		24.3%
1970	7,713		21.0%
1980	13,606		76.4%
1990	15,696		15.4%
2000	21,941		39.8%
2010	26,262		19.7%
2020	33,337		26.9%
U.S. Decennial Census

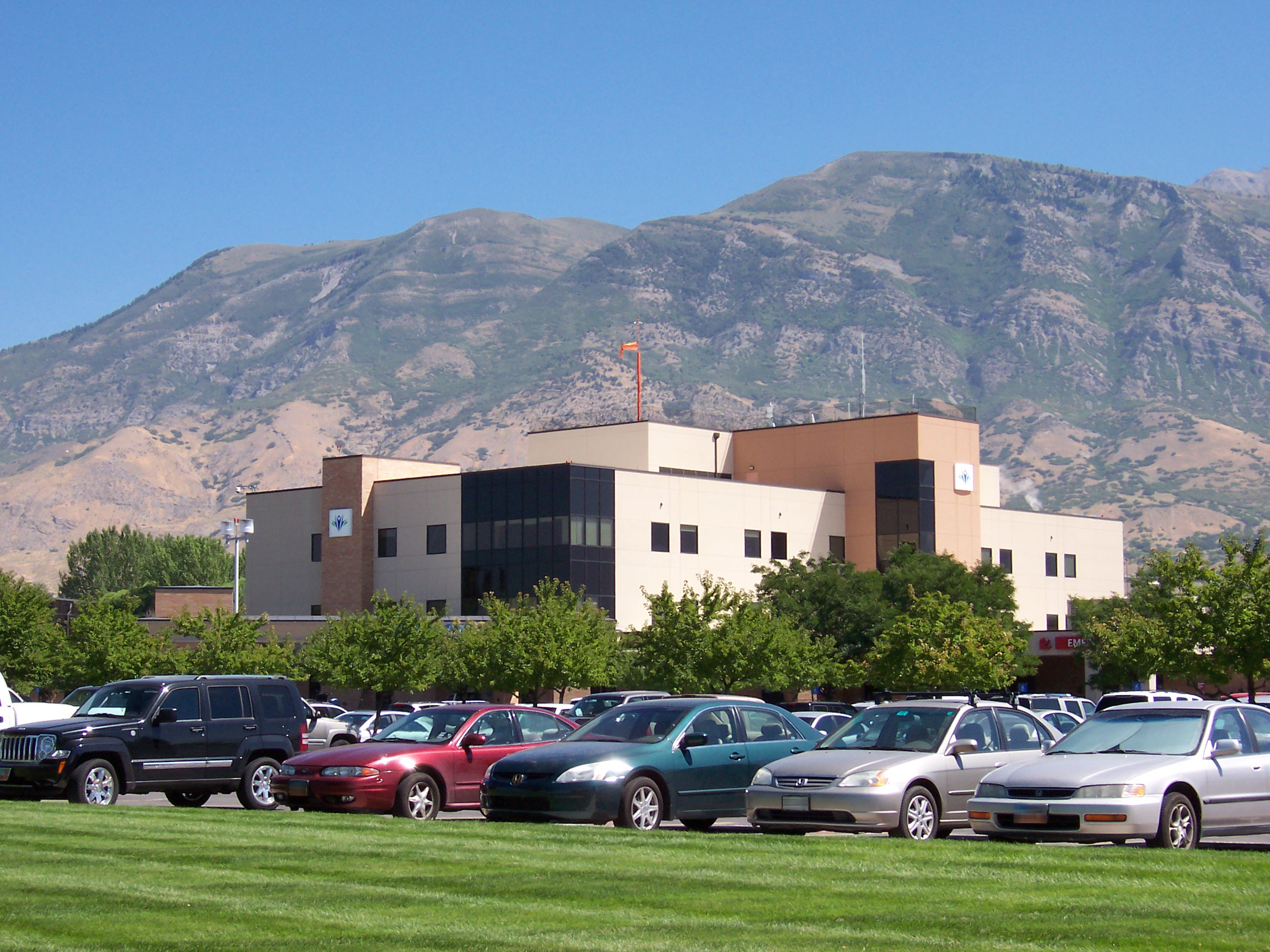
American Fork IHC Hospital

As of the census estimates in 2023, there were an estimated 38,549 people in 10,240 households residing in the city. The population density was 3457.1 people per square mile (1,334.9/km^{2}). The racial makeup of the city was 82.1% White (non-Hispanic), 9.9% Hispanic or Latino. 1.6% Asian, 0.4% Native American, 1% Pacific Islander, 0.2% African American, and 7% from two or more races. 6.1% of the population were foreign-born.

30.3% of the population were under 18 years old (8.1% under 5); 9.7% were 65 or older. 48.7% of the population were female. 94.3% of persons over 25 had high school degrees, and 40.9% had bachelor's degrees or higher.

The median income for a household in the city was $90,490. 6.8% of the population were below the poverty line. The homeownership rate was 71.3%. The last known number of housing units was 7,598 in 2007. The median value of owner-occupied housing units was $406,900.

In 2007 there were 2,754 businesses in the city, with total retail sales of over $724 million.

=== 2020 census ===
As of the 2020 census, American Fork had a population of 33,337. The median age was 28.9 years. 31.5% of residents were under the age of 18 and 10.7% of residents were 65 years of age or older. For every 100 females there were 99.8 males, and for every 100 females age 18 and over there were 96.8 males age 18 and over.

99.1% of residents lived in urban areas, while 0.9% lived in rural areas.

There were 10,041 households in American Fork, of which 45.0% had children under the age of 18 living in them. Of all households, 67.1% were married-couple households, 11.1% were households with a male householder and no spouse or partner present, and 18.6% were households with a female householder and no spouse or partner present. About 15.0% of all households were made up of individuals and 6.5% had someone living alone who was 65 years of age or older.

There were 10,397 housing units, of which 3.4% were vacant. The homeowner vacancy rate was 0.6% and the rental vacancy rate was 4.9%.

Racial composition as of the 2020 census
Race	Number	Percent
White	28,461	85.4%
Black or African American	185	0.6%
American Indian and Alaska Native	209	0.6%
Asian	505	1.5%
Native Hawaiian and Other Pacific Islander	303	0.9%
Some other race	1,337	4.0%
Two or more races	2,337	7.0%
Hispanic or Latino (of any race)	3,203	9.6%

=== 2010 census ===
In the 2010 census 7.1% identified themselves as being either bisexual or homosexual.

== Education ==
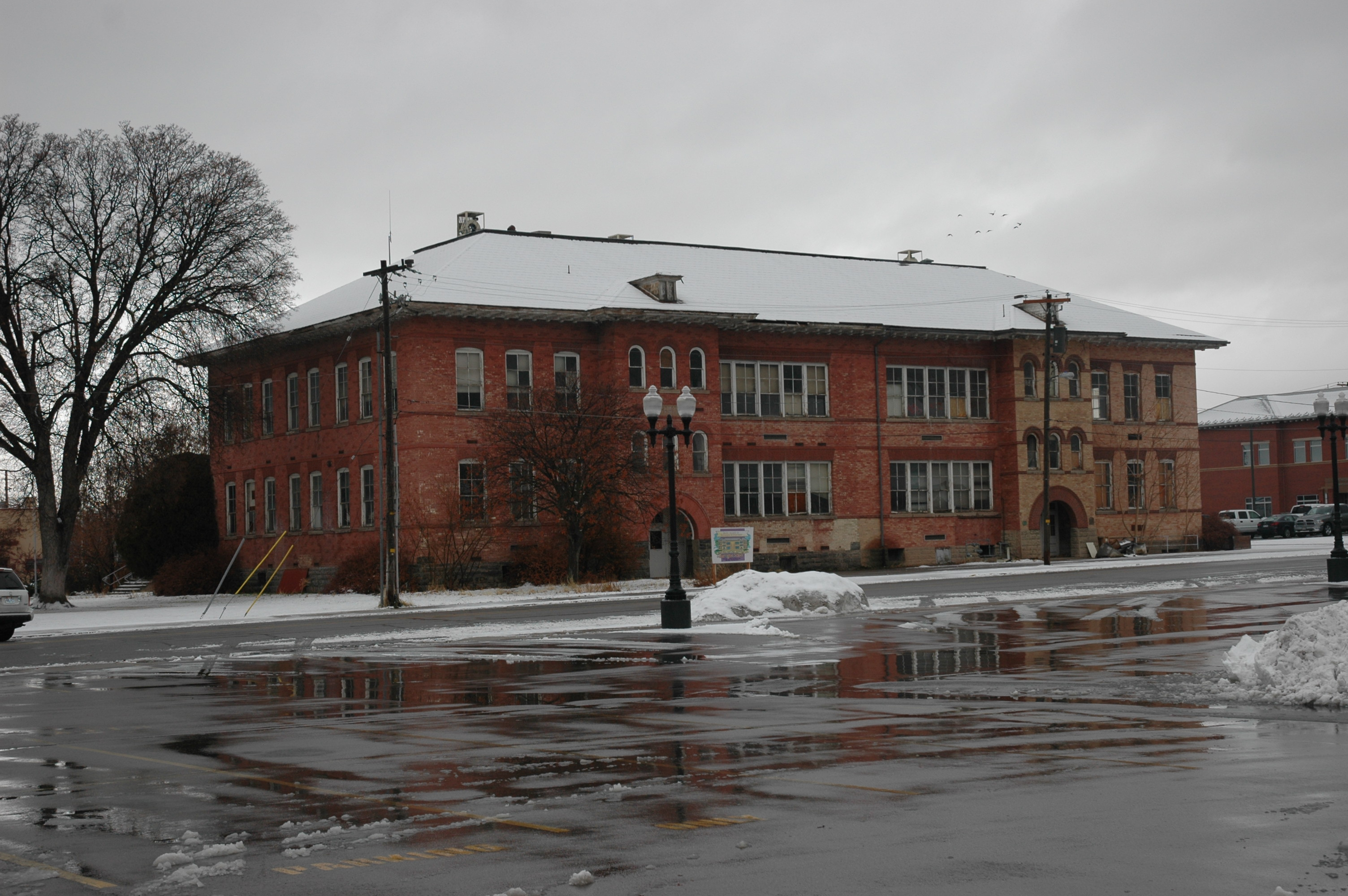
Harrington Elementary School

Public schools in American Fork are part of the Alpine School District and include a senior high school (American Fork High School), junior high school (American Fork Jr. High), and five elementary schools (Barratt Elementary, Forbes Elementary, Greenwood Elementary, Legacy Elementary, and Shelley Elementary). Shane Farnsworth is the Superintendent of Schools.

Private schools include American Heritage School.

== Media ==
The 1992 film The Sandlot was mostly filmed on the Wasatch Front. The carnival scene was filmed in American Fork on State Street by Robinson Park.

Several scenes from the 1984 movie Footloose were filmed in American Fork, including the opening scene inside the church, the front porch scene with Kevin Bacon and his family, and the gas station scene in which Bacon refuels his Volkswagen.

In 2026, American Fork was the primary setting for a viral online documentary series produced by YouTuber Benjamin Schneider, known online as Reckless Ben. The series, which investigated local business disputes and subsequent actions by the American Fork Police Department, generated significant internet attention, drawing over 4.5 million views and extensive coverage from prominent online commentators. Reckless Ben's documentary highlighted the role played by the American Fork Police Department, making claims of corruption and collusion with Bricks and Minifigs. The widespread media coverage and public scrutiny prompted the American Fork Police Department to release an official video statement and body-worn camera footage to defend the department's role in the events.

== Infrastructure ==
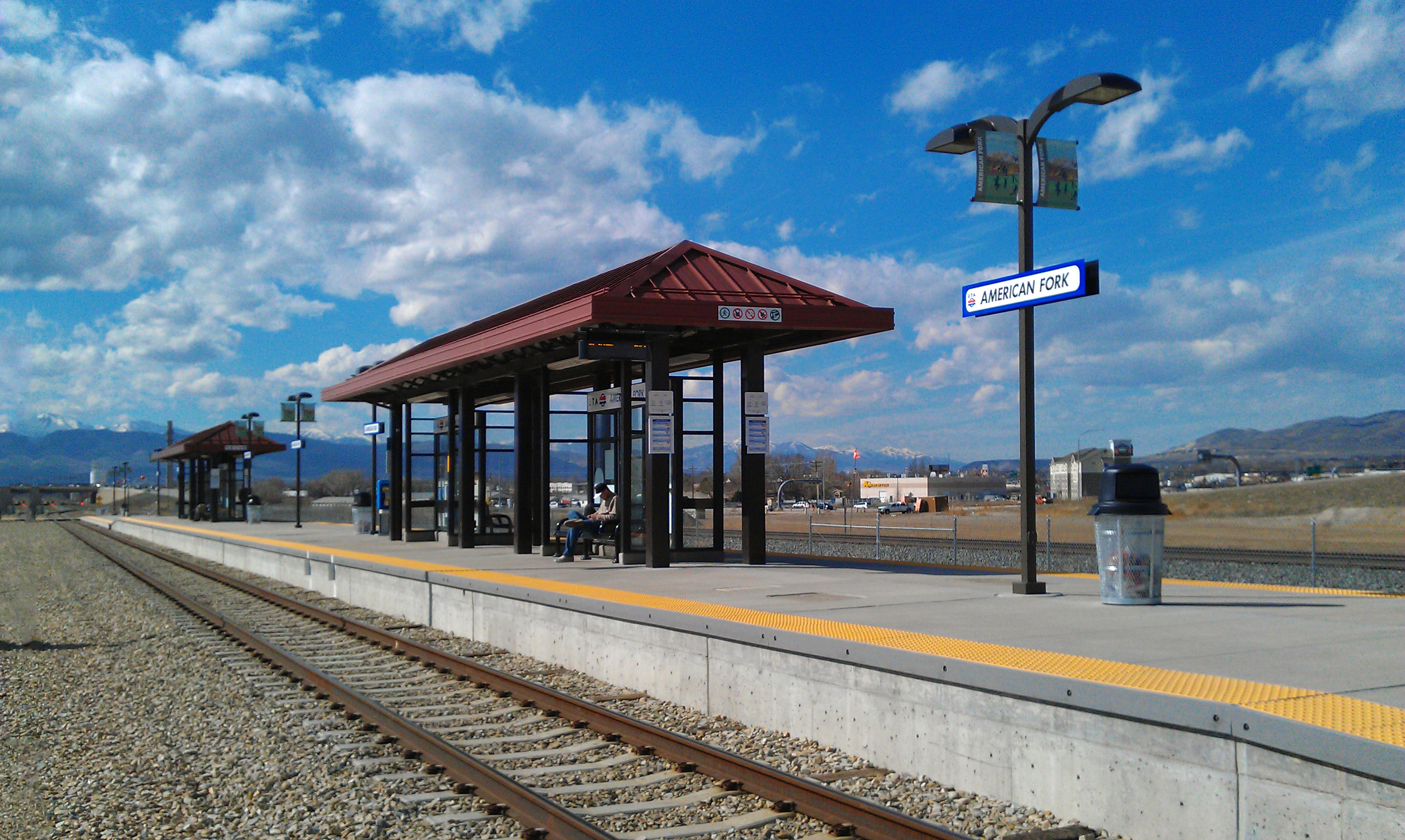
A FrontRunner Station in American Fork. The frontRunner is the commuter rail line along the Wasatch Front.

In 2012, the FrontRunner commuter rail line began operation in Utah County, opening the American Fork station.

== Notable people ==
- Paul Dayton Bailey – author and owner of Westernlore Press
- Merrill J. Bateman – emeritus general authority of the LDS Church and former President of Brigham Young University
- Wayne C. Booth – literary scholar at the University of Chicago
- Reva Beck Bosone – first female U.S. Representative from Utah
- Witney Carson – ballroom dancer on Dancing with the Stars and participant on So You Think You Can Dance
- Stephen L. Chipman – prominent LDS Church leader and businessman
- D. Todd Christofferson – LDS Church leader and current member of the Quorum of the Twelve Apostles
- Jordan Devey – is a former American football offensive guard
- Gary Herbert – former Governor of Utah
- Joshua James – folk singer-songwriter
- Whitney Leavitt – media personality known for The Secret Lives of Mormon Wives
- Grant Liddle – endocrinologist
- Mia Love – U.S. Representative from Utah's 4th Congressional District
- Brandon Sanderson – fantasy author
- MyKayla Skinner – artistic gymnast, Olympic silver medalist
- Daniel Wayne Sermon – lead guitarist in the rock band Imagine Dragons
- Madison Snow – racing driver
- James LeVoy Sorenson – medical inventor
- Andrew Tolman – drums, percussion, backing vocals, rhythm guitar formerly of the rock band Imagine Dragons

== See also ==
- List of cities and towns in Utah
