= Loveless (surname) =

- Pronunciation: /ˈlʌvləsˌˈlʌvlɪs/
- Language: English

Origin
- Language: Middle English
- Derivation: lǒvelē̆s
- Meaning: 'without love', 'unpleasant'

Other names
- Alternative spelling: Luveles (archaic)

Loveless is a surname. Notable people with the surname include:

- A. Scott Loveless, American academic
- Arthur Loveless (1873–1971), American architect
- Bruce Loveless (born 1963), American naval admiral
- Bob Loveless (1929–2010), American knifemaker
- Elvis Loveless, Canadian politician
- Eoin Loveless, English guitarist for Drenge
- Ernie Loveless (1907–1950), Australian rules football player
- Henrietta Loveless (1903–1956), American actress and singer
- Henry Allen Loveless (1854–1921), American businessman and community leader
- Herschel C. Loveless (1911–1989), American politician and 34th Governor of Iowa
- James Loveless, one of the Tolpuddle Martyrs
- Jim Loveless (1907–1997), American football and basketball coach
- Joan Potter Loveless (1928–2009), American weaver and writer
- Joseph Henry Loveless (1870–1916), American criminal, murder suspect, and murder victim
- Kyle Loveless, American politician who served in the Oklahoma Senate
- Lea Loveless Maurer (born 1971), American swimmer
- Lily Loveless (born 1990), British actress
- Lydia Loveless (born 1990), American country singer
- Mary Loveless (1899-1991), American physician and immunologist
- Melinda Loveless (born 1975), one of the perpetrators of the torture-murder of Shanda Sharer
- Patty Loveless (born 1957), American country singer
- Roger Loveless, artist
- Shaka Loveless (born 1984), Danish rapper
- Shane Loveless (born 1958), Australian footballer

== Fictional ==
- Dr. Loveless, recurring character in the 1960s western television series The Wild Wild West

== Disambiguation pages ==
- George Loveless (disambiguation)

== See also ==
- Loveless (disambiguation)
