= D. Gordon Smith =

- Education: Brigham Young University (B.A.); University of Chicago Law School (JD)
- Occupation: Law professor
- Employer: Brigham Young University

D. Gordon Smith (born 16 November 1962) was the dean of the J. Reuben Clark Law School (BYU Law) of Brigham Young University (BYU) from 2016 to 2023. Smith has taught classes in business associations, contracts, corporate finance, law & entrepreneurship, and securities regulation.

Smith was born in Bremerton, Washington. He received a bachelor's degree in accounting from the Marriott School of Business at BYU in 1986. He then attended the University of Chicago Law School where he earned his J.D. degree in 1990. After graduating, he worked as a judicial law clerk for W. Eugene Davis on the U.S. Court of Appeals for the Fifth Circuit. Smith then spent three years with the law firm of Skadden, Arps, Slate, Meagher & Flom before joining the faculty of Lewis and Clark Law School. After working on the faculty for a few years, he became a professor at the University of Wisconsin Law School until 2007 when he joined the BYU Law faculty with the appointment of Glen L. Farr Professor of Law.

Smith's main expertise is in business law. He co-authored with Cynthia Williams the casebook Business Organizations: Cases, Problems and Case Studies.

== Publications ==
=== Casebooks ===
- Fiduciary Law: Cases and Materials, (forthcoming Wolters Kluwer) (with Evan Criddle, Andrew Gold & Paul Miller).
- Business Organizations: Cases, Problems & Case Studies, (3d ed. Wolters Kluwer 2012) (with Cynthia A. Williams).

=== Treatises ===
- Bromberg & Ribstein on Partnerships, (3d ed. Wolters Kluwer 2019) (with Christine Hurt).
- Bromberg & Ribstein on Limited Liability Partnerships, the Revisited Uniform Partnership Act, and the Uniform Limited Partnership Act, (2d. ed. Wolters Kluwer 2020) (with Christine Hurt).

=== Handbooks ===
- Handbook on Law and Entrepreneurship, (forthcoming Cambridge University Press 2021) (with Brian Broughman & Christine Hurt).
- Research Handbook on Fiduciary Law, (Edward Elgar 2018) (with Andrew Gold).

=== General Law Review Articles ===
- Insider Trading and Entrepreneurial Action, 95 N.C. L. Rev. 1507 (2017)
- Family Law and Entrepreneurial Action, 77 Ohio St. L.J.: Furthermore 31 (2016) (response to Benjamin Means, The Contractual Foundation of Family-Business Law, 75 Ohio St. L.J. 675 (2014)). [SSRN]
- Fiduciary Discretion, 5 Ohio St. L.J. 609 (2014) (with Jordan C. Lee). [SSRN]
- Private Ordering with Shareholder Bylaws, 80 Fordham L. Rev. 125 (2011) (with Matthew Wright & Marcus Kai Hintze), reprinted in 54 Corporate Practice Commentator 147 (2012). [SSRN]
- Contracts as Organizations, 51 Ariz. L. Rev. 1 (2009) (with Brayden King) (published with commentary by Robert P. Bartlett, III & Anna Gelpern). [SSRN]
- Entrepreneurs on Horseback: Reflections on the Organization of Law, 50 Ariz. L. Rev. 71 (2008) (with Darian M. Ibrahim). [SSRN]
- The Dystopian Potential of Corporate Law, 57 Emory L.J. 985 (2008) (published with a companion piece: Kent Greenfield, Saving the World with Corporate Law, 57 Emory L.J. 948 (2008)). [SSRN]
- The Exit Structure of Venture Capital, 53 UCLA L. Rev. 315 (2005) (selected as one of the Best Corporate & Securities Articles of 2006 in a poll of corporate and securities law professors). [SSRN]
- The Critical Resource Theory of Fiduciary Duty, 55 Vand. L. Rev. 1399 (2002). [SSRN]
- Toward a New Theory of the Shareholder Role: “Sacred Space” in Corporate Transactions, 80 Texas L. Rev. 261 (2001) (with Robert B. Thompson), reprinted in 44 Corporate Practice Commentator 453 (2002) (selected as one of the Best Corporate & Securities Articles of 2002 in a poll of corporate and securities law professors). [SSRN]
- The Shareholder Primacy Norm, 23 J. Corp. L. 277 (1998). [SSRN]
- Corporate Governance and Managerial Incompetence: Lessons From Kmart, 74 N.C. L. Rev. 1037 (1996). [SSRN]
- Beyond “Public Concern”: New Free Speech Standards for Public Employees, 57 U. Chi. L. Rev. 249 (1990) (student comment).

=== Articles Published as Part of a Symposium ===
- Contractually Adopted Fiduciary Duty, 2014 U. Ill. L. Rev. 1793, for “Larry Ribstein Memorial Symposium,” sponsored by the University of Illinois College of Law, October 17–18, 2013. [SSRN]
- Law and Entrepreneurial Opportunities, 98 Cornell L. Rev. 1533 (2013), (with Darian Ibrahim) for “Symposium on Law and Entrepreneurship,” sponsored by Cornell Law School, New York City, NY on November 2, 2012. [SSRN]
- Unpacking Adaptability, 2009 BYU L. Rev. 1553 (with Andreas Engert), for “BYU Law Review Symposium on Evaluating Legal Origins Theory,” sponsored by J. Reuben Clark Law School, Brigham Young University, Provo, Utah on February 6, 2009. [SSRN]
- A Case Study of Bloggership, 84 Wash. U. L.Q. 1135 (2006), for “Bloggership: How Blogs are Transforming Legal Scholarship,” sponsored by Harvard Law School, Cambridge, Massachusetts on April 28, 2006. [SSRN]
- The “Branding Effect” of Contracts, 12 Harv. Negot. L. Rev. 189 (2007), for “Conference on Case Studies and Negotiations,” sponsored by Harvard Law School, Cambridge, Massachusetts on April 26, 2006. [SSRN]
- Law & Entrepreneurship: Do Courts Matter?, 1 Entrepreneurial Bus. L.J. 353 (2006) (with Masako Ueda), for “Location, Luck, or the Law: Why Some Venture Capital Communities Flourish,” sponsored by The Ohio State University Michael E. Moritz College of Law, Columbus, Ohio on March 17, 2006. [SSRN]
- The Exit Structure of Strategic Alliances, 2005 U. Ill L. Rev. 303 (2005), for “Uncorporation: A New Age?,” sponsored by the University of Illinois College of Law, Chicago, Illinois on April 23, 2004. [SSRN]
- Independent Legal Significance, Good Faith, and the Interpretation of Venture Capital Contracts, 40 Willamette L. Rev. 825 (2004), for “Venture Capital after the Bubble,” sponsored by Willamette University College of Law, Portland, Oregon on March 5, 2004. [SSRN]
- A Proposal to Eliminate Director Standards From the Model Business Corporations Act, 67 U. Cin. L. Rev. 1201 (1999), for “Twelfth Annual Conference on Corporate Law,” sponsored by University of Cincinnati School of Law, Cincinnati, Ohio on March 11, 1999. [SSRN]
- Team Production in Venture Capital Investing, 24 J. Corp. L. 949 (1999), for “Sloan Conference on Team Production in Business Associations,” sponsored by Georgetown Law Center, Washington, D.C. on March 4–5, 1999. [SSRN]
- Venture Capital Contracting in the Information Age, 2 J. Small & Emerging Bus. L. 133 (1998), for “Financing Innovation: The Future of Capital Formation for Small and Emerging Businesses,” sponsored by Northwestern School of Law of Lewis & Clark College, Portland, Oregon on September 26, 1997. [SSRN]
- Chancellor Allen and the Fundamental Question, 21 Seattle U. L. Rev. 577 (1998), for “A Tribute to Chancellor William T. [SSRN]

=== Book chapters ===
- Firms and Fiduciaries, in Contract, Status, and Fiduciary Law 293 (Andrew Gold & Paul Miller eds., 2016). [SSRN]
- The Modern Business Judgment Rule, in Research Handbook on Mergers and Acquisitions 83 (Steven Davidoff Solomon & Claire Hill eds., 2016). [SSRN]
- Doctrines of Last Resort, in Revisiting the Contracts Scholarship of Stewart Macaulay: On the Empirical and the Lyrical (Jean Braucher, John Kidwell & William Whitford, eds. 2013), for a conference sponsored by the University of Wisconsin Law School, Madison, Wisconsin on October 21, 2011. [SSRN]
- The Role of Shareholders in the Modern American Corporation, in Research Handbook on the Economics of Corporate Law 52 (Claire A. Hill & Brett H. McDonnell eds., 2012). [SSRN]
- Commons, Hurst, Macaulay, and the Wisconsin Legal Tradition, in The Elgar Companion to Transaction Cost Economics 66 (Peter G. Klein & Michael E. Sykuta eds., 2010). [SSRN]
- Duties of Nominee Directors, in Comparative Company Law: A Case-Based Approach, (Mathias Siems & David Cabrelli eds., 2013).

== Sources ==
- Smith's vita
- BYU Law School bio of Smith
- listing of BYU law professors
