= JRCLS =

JRCLS may refer to:

- J. Reuben Clark Law School
- J. Reuben Clark Law Society
