= Lew W. Cramer =

American businessman, former government official

Lew W. Cramer (born 1949) is an American businessman and former government official.

Cramer was born in San Francisco, California. He was partly raised in Okinawa, where his father was stationed with the US military. He began his undergraduate career at Stanford University. He is a Latter-day Saint, and the bishop of his LDS ward was Henry B. Eyring who was influential in convincing him to serve an LDS mission. He served in the Germany Berlin Mission. After his mission he studied at Brigham Young University completing his undergraduate work and also attending law school there.

Cramer practiced law in both Los Angeles and in the San Francisco Bay Area for the next few years. In 1984 he was involved with the preparation for the Los Angeles Olympics. He then came to Washington as a White House Fellow working for Ronald Reagan. He later worked in various positions in the Commerce Department, ending up as Director General of the U.S. and Foreign Commercial Service by recess appointment., which at the time had a staff of 1,400 in 68 US and 125 foreign offices. He was closely involved with trade negotiations with Eastern Bloc countries in the period of 1988-1990. In this position he was involved in extending their business to Eastern European countries. After that he created an international business consulting firm with Jake Garn.

After leaving federal service, Cramer became an international vice president for U.S. West (now MediaOne). Cramer contributed the article on Abinadi to the Encyclopedia of Mormonism. From 2003-2005 Cramer was head of the J. Reuben Clark Law Society.

In 2006 Cramer was recruited by Jon Huntsman, Jr to form the World Trade Center of Utah. He stepped down from this position in 2013. Cramer is CEO of Colliers International-Utah, a commercial real estate company. Since 2013 Cramer has also been stake president of the Salt Lake Ensign Stake.

Cramer has also been on the national presidential advisory board of Utah Valley University.

== Sources ==
- announcement of Reagan's nomination of Cramer
- Deseret News, July 31, 2016
- Deseret News, October 28, 2013
- Salt Lake Tribune August 28, 2015
