= Hannah Clayson Smith =

American lawyer

Hannah Smith
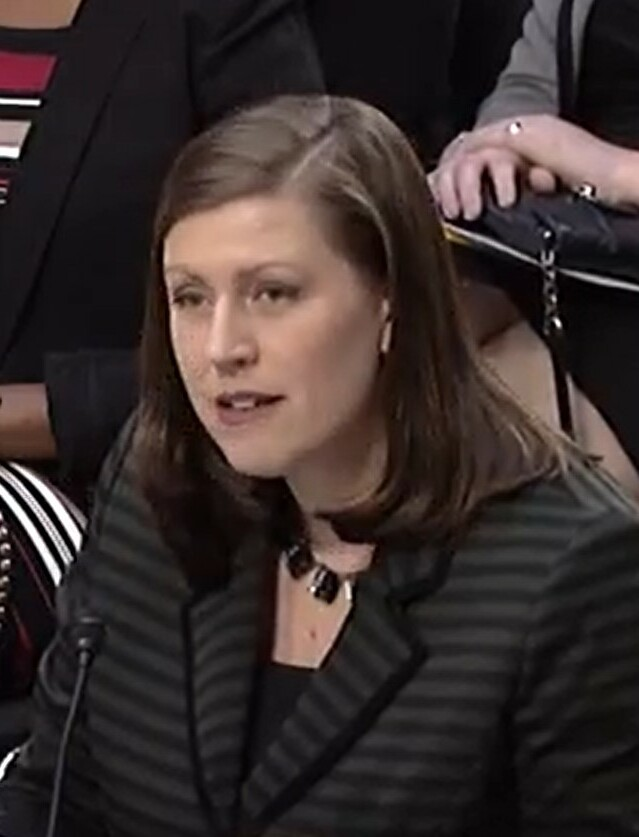
- Smith in 2017

Personal details
- Spouse: John Smith
- Children: 4
- Education: Princeton University (AB); Brigham Young University (JD)
- Profession: Lawyer

Hannah Clayson Smith is an American attorney with the firm Schaerr Jaffe. Smith is a senior fellow at the International Center for Law and Religion Studies at Brigham Young University (BYU) and a member of the Board of Directors of the Religious Freedom Institute.

== Biography ==
Smith was raised in California and is the sister of Jane Clayson Johnson. She earned a bachelor's degree from the Woodrow Wilson School of Public and International Affairs at Princeton University before attending BYU's J. Reuben Clark Law School. During law school, Smith was elected to the Order of the Coif and served as Executive Editor of the BYU Law Review. Smith also served as a missionary for the Church of Jesus Christ of Latter-day Saints in the Switzerland Geneva Mission, which covered parts of Switzerland and France.

Following law school, Smith clerked for then-Judge Samuel Alito of the Third Circuit Court of Appeals. She next clerked for Justice Clarence Thomas of the United States Supreme Court from 2003 to 2004, and then returned in 2006 to clerk at the Supreme Court a second time for Justice Alito following his appointment as an associate justice. She practiced law at Williams & Connolly and Sidley Austin in Washington D.C.

Smith's legal practice focuses on appellate litigation. She was part of the legal team for landmark U.S. Supreme Court victories such as Zubik v. Burwell, Burwell v. Hobby Lobby, Holt v. Hobbs, and Hosanna-Tabor Evangelical Lutheran Church and School v. EEOC.

In 2017, Smith testified before the Senate Judiciary Committee in support of Neil Gorsuch's nomination to the U.S. Supreme Court. Her testimony reviewed his jurisprudence relating to religious liberty cases, including two of Becket's clients: the Little Sisters of the Poor and Hobby Lobby.

== Honors and awards ==
In 2014, Smith was awarded the BYU Alumni Achievement Award. In 2016, Smith was awarded the J. Reuben Clark Law Society's Women-in-Law Leadership Award. In 2018, she was awarded the James Madison Award from the Center for Constitutional Studies.

Smith served on the Brigham Young University Law School's Board of Advisers as well as on the Deseret News editorial advisory board. Smith was on the inaugural panel of Stanford Law School's religious freedom clinic.

== Personal life ==
Smith is married to John Smith, an attorney who also clerked for Alito, and they have four children.

== See also ==
- List of law clerks for the eighth seat of the Supreme Court of the United States
- List of law clerks for the tenth seat of the Supreme Court of the United States

== Selected publications ==
- Smith, Hannah & Daniel Benson (2017). When a Pastor's House Is a Church Home: Why the Parsonage Allowance Is Desirable Under the Establishment Clause, The Federalist Society Review.
