= Denise Posse-Blanco Lindberg =

American lawyer, judge, and LDS Church figure

Denise Posse-Blanco Lindberg (born 1950) is a former district court judge of the 3rd judicial district of Utah. She is a member of the Church of Jesus Christ of Latter-day Saints (LDS Church) and in 2014 was called as a member of the church's general board of the Young Women organization.

== Early life and education ==
Lindberg was born in Cuba, and educated in Cuba, Puerto Rico, and the United States. Her father was Cuban and her mother was a Puerto Rican U.S. citizen; as a result, Lindberg was born a dual citizen of Cuba and the United States. In 1960, she, her mother, and her brother were forced to leave Cuba; her father was forced to remain in Cuba. In 1963, Lindberg's family came to the U.S., settling in New Rochelle, New York. She and her family were introduced to the LDS Church through the Mormon exhibit at the New York World's Fair. By that time her father had also left Cuba. Following high school, Lindberg attended Brigham Young University (BYU), where she received a bachelor's degree in communications, and the University of Utah where she received a master's degree in educational psychology in 1973, a master's degree in social work in 1978 and a Ph.D. in health sciences in 1980. During—and following—her graduate schooling at the University of Utah, Lindberg worked for various State of Utah agencies. As part of her work, she became intrigued with the analytical approach used in the law. Lindberg received a scholarship to BYU's J. Reuben Clark Law School. She graduated magna cum laude, placing second in her class. She served as an articles editor for the BYU Law Review.

== Judicial career ==
Following graduation from law school, Lindberg served as a law clerk for Monroe G. McKay of the United States Court of Appeals for the Tenth Circuit and for Justice Sandra Day O'Connor of the Supreme Court of the United States. Following her clerkships, Lindberg practiced as an appellate and healthcare lawyer in the Washington, D.C. offices of two national law firms.

In 1995 Lindberg returned to Utah and worked as in-house counsel for a subsidiary of Aetna Life and Casualty Company. Lindberg was appointed as a district judge to Utah's Third Judicial District bench in 1998 by Utah Governor Mike Leavitt. She is considered the first Hispanic American of either gender appointed to a district court judgeship in Utah. Lindberg's caseload includes both civil and criminal cases. Lindberg is a Master of the Bench with the American Inns of Court, is on the executive committee of two Utah Bar sections, and was elected a member of the American Law Institute in 2000, where she currently serves as an advisor to an ALI project.

At the end of 2014 Lindberg retired from being a judge.

== Notable cases ==
In 2003, a civil case that Lindberg ruled in favor of Sprint's motion for summary judgment in finding they had not violated the spam law for sending emails to a man who had signed up to receive emails from them. Lindberg has also been the judge involved in the case of the United Effort Plan and the attempts to reform it in order to pay those who are owed money by it as the result of lawsuits. In 2005 Lindberg dealt with a more criminal case in the Mark Hacking case, where Lindberg sentenced 6 years to life in prison.

== Personal life ==
She is married to Neil Lindberg and they are the parents of two sons. Lindberg served with her husband as a church-service missionary assigned to a Spanish-speaking branch in Taylorsville, Utah. In 2014, she was called as a member of the LDS Church's Young Women General Board.

In 2018, Lindberg gave an address on religious freedom at Pontificia Universidad Católica Madre y Maestra law school in the Dominican Republic.

== See also ==
- List of law clerks for the eighth seat of the Supreme Court of the United States
