= Argentine nationality law =

Citizenship Act Ley de Ciudadanía

Argentine Senate
- Citation: RGBl at 583
- Territorial extent: Argentina
- Passed by: National Congress of Argentina
- Passed: 8 October 1869
- Administered by: Cabinet Chief's Office
- Status: Amended

Argentine nationality law regulates the manner in which one acquires, or is eligible to acquire, Argentine nationality. Nationality, as used in international law, describes the legal methods by which a person obtains a national identity and formal membership in a nation. Citizenship refers to the relationship between a nation and a national, after membership has been attained. Argentina recognizes a dual system accepting Jus soli and Jus sanguinis for the acquisition of nationality by birth and allows foreign persons to naturalise.

Recent changes by the Decree DNU 366 / 2025 have tightened the requirement to get citizenship, but allowing investment methods.

== Terminology ==
The distinction between the meaning of the terms citizenship and nationality is not always clear in the English language and differs by country. Generally, nationality refers to a person's legal belonging to a country and is the common term used in international treaties when referring to members of a state; citizenship refers to the set of rights and duties a person has in that nation.

It can be possible for a non-national to obtain a degree of civil and political rights commonly associated with citizenship (e.g., residence or working rights) while it is also possible for a national to be prohibited from exercising certain rights (e.g., children barred from voting). In Argentine, the term "nationality" (nacionalidad) refers to state membership while "citizenship" (ciudadanía) describes a person's participation in national society.

== Introduction to History ==
Ideas and practices of nationality and citizenship in the Republic of Argentina (and before that, in the Viceroyalty of the Río de la Plata and the Inca Empire) have changed with distinct periods of its history, including but not limited to periods of indigenous, colonial, republican, and military rule. These periods, in which political rights were often denied to both citizens and non-citizens, encouraged the development of resistance movements. This history of resistance and fighting for political rights is deeply imbedded in the modern Argentine notion of citizenship.

== Inca ==
The Inca Empire was a conglomeration of conquered ethnic groups, etnías, ruled by ethnic Inca from the Cuzco-Lake Titicaca Basin in what is now central Peru. They called their empire Tiwantinsuyu, meaning "four corners." Modern northern and western Argentina was a part of Kollasuyu. The Inca elite imposed their own institutions on conquered territories, while at the same time incorporating local customs on a case-by-case basis. Because the Argentine portion of Kollasuyu was on the edge of the empire the communities there had even more local autonomy than elsewhere in the empire, but were still subject to Inca protection and duties through the mita system of reciprocity. At the same time, Inca statebuilding was based on the threat of violence.

Other expressions of Inca presence were the spoken language of Quechua, the official spoken language of all governance (the Inca had no written language), and became a symbol of Inca presence through contact with officials and the renaming of local landmarks. Imperial, administrative titles were given to local officials and ethnic/ayllu leaders, thus incorporating them into the empire's broader, administrative structure. The Inca conducted detailed censuses using the quipu. Inclusion on the census made one, officially, an Inca subject, and they resettled conquered peoples for a variety of administrative reasons. Often, the moving of these mitmaqkuna settlers was purely an expression of power over newly conquered subjects.

== Colonisation and the viceroyalty ==
After being colonised by the Spanish, Argentina was made part of the Viceroyalty of Peru. In 1776 it became part of the new, and ultimately short-lived, Viceroyalty of the Río de la Plata. Throughout Spanish America, citizenship was both a legal and a social status that was implicit rather than formal, and largely informed by one's racial and class background. As in the Inca Empire, the colonising power's concepts were combined with the unique dictates of the situation in the colony itself.

The Casta system of racial classification was the foundation of social order, and thus rights, throughout Spanish America. Peninsulares, Criollo (people)s, Indios, and the growing group of mixed-race inhabitants (usually mestizos) all had different citizenship rights. Peninsulares had the full rights and privileges of naturaleza, and were the most esteemed in society and therefore were the ideal vecinos. Criollos were the most common in Buenos Aires, and were naturales and vecinos too, though with an implicitly lower status. Indios and mestizos were, initially, excluded from citizenship status entirely.

The presence of non-Spanish Europeans in the Viceroyalties of Peru and Rio de La Plata was, officially, illegal. Though “insiders” and “outsiders” were not explicitly defined in the viceroyalties, Spanish law did differentiate between the two by granting privileges only to those considered members of the community. Because the concept of ‘community’ itself was poorly, if at all defined, non-members were deemed to be so on a case-by-case basis, based on community opinion and, where available, on precedent. In order to become a member of the community, an outsider usually needed to prove that he was born in the territory, and culturally Spanish (Spanish speaking and writing, Catholic, etc.). In this way Spanish America tended towards jus soli (right by birthplace). Foreigners could apply to the audiencia for a license to remain in the viceroyalty, or they could apply to the Crown (through the Council of the Indies for naturalisation. The former did not grant the foreigner any rights, while the latter carta de naturaleza granted most rights afforded to other members (with some exceptions, including the right to own and operate a business). Obtaining the carta de naturaleza was a lengthier process requiring more proof of cultural Spanishness, and usually a monetary payment to a Crown office or official. It was considered a personal grant, and therefore a personal relationship with a Crown official was invaluable.

Colonial Buenos Aires was a relatively small frontier settlement threatened by the indigenous and Portuguese presence in the area, which gave the city's residents an especially acute sense of their Spanishness. To this end, city officials only allowed "natives of the kingdoms of Spain" (naturales) to become citizens. Only foreigners who could provide a useful service to the city and who were considered culturally Spanish were granted the status. These individuals were almost always of non-Spanish European ancestry, and where rarely (if ever) indigenous or African. In the 1610s, an oath for citizenship candidates was created that required them to possess a house and arms; however, the number of applicants dropped in subsequent years and the oath fell out of use.

By the eighteenth century, Indians were receiving citizenship statuses of their own. Initially classified as members of indigenous communities by birth, this status helped determine their labour (repartimiento) and taxation (tributo) duties to the Crown. Still, the terms vecino and naturaleza were never officially applied. The implicit valuing of peninsulares over criollos in Spanish America was a key point of contention in the debates over independence, particularly in the highly-literate city of Buenos Aires. Though they legally belonged to the same kingdom as naturalezas, only criollos had been born in the Americas (as vecinos), and thus felt that they had a unique claim to the land, its administration, and the rights that would follow.

== Independence and the new republic ==
During the Argentine War of Independence, delegates met in 1813 to draft a constitution based upon the model of the Constitution of Cadiz for the United Provinces of the Río de la Plata, granting citizenship to free men born and living in the provinces. It did not create a central authority, having granted the various provinces autonomy, and had no real authority outside of Buenos Aires Province.

The Independence movement in Argentina was primarily criollo movement, and thus the citizenship laws made in its aftermath primarily affected the criollo population. (A notable exception: The Asamblea del Año XIII, or Assembly of 1813, precursed the official Argentine Declaration of Independence in July 1816, but is the republic's first attempt at a constitution. Though the delegates could not agree on many major points, Freedom of Wombs was declared, giving freedom and citizenship to slaves' children born within the territory. It also states that the Argentine Indians were ruled by the Pampas in the 1800s.)

Led by Domingo Faustino Sarmiento, Juan Bautista Alberdi, and Esteban Echeverria in response to the Rosas administration, the Generation of 1830 proposed a new, modern Argentina built on economic partnerships with Europe and European immigrants. Sarmiento's “civilization or barbarism” and Alberdi's “civil liberty for all, political liberty for a few” and "to rule is to populate" characterize the society they envisioned – one of order and progress, in which those qualified to run the state were men of European intellectual tradition. This more elitist approach to governance effectively proposed two tiers of citizenship.

A failed Constitution of 1819 was rejected by the provinces. Numerous attempts by various Constituent Assemblies were unable to resolve whether the Provinces would follow a monarchical or republican form of government, which proved to be the downfall of the 1826 Constitution, as well. The first successful attempt to adopt an Argentine Constitution occurred in 1853. It established in Article 15 that slavery was abolished, in Article 16 that all inhabitants were equal under the law, and in Article 20 that foreigners living in the country should have the same civil rights as citizens and were eligible for naturalisation after residing in Argentina for two years.

No matter how close economic and cultural ties were (or were desired to be) with Europe, political discourse in the mid-nineteenth century up to Peronism after the Second World War made Europeans the counterpoint “other” to Argentine collective identity. Argentina was developing on the same economically liberal model as European powers (particularly Spain, Britain, and France), but improving on it.

Argentine involvement in Mercosur integration began in the late 20th century. Initial cooperation was focused on the economy through the establishment of Mercosur as a regional trade bloc. Argentina became a founding member of Mercosur in 1991, alongside Brazil, Paraguay, and Uruguay. This agreement aimed to promote economic integration and cooperation among its member states.

== Nationality law and civil status ==
The constitution established that nationality could be gained or lost, as was described in civil law. As early as 1867, the Supreme Court confirmed that a married woman shared her husband's nationality. In a case involving Elena Eyras, an Argentine, and her husband Manuel Pedro de la Peña, a Paraguayan, the husband argued their separate nationalities warranted a decision in federal court. The court refused to hear their marital dispute, denying federal jurisdiction on the grounds that married women were required to have a unified identity and share the same domicile as their husbands.

Law 346 of 8 October 1869, the first Argentine nationality law, established in Article 1 that birth in Argentina was the basis for nationality of a child regardless of its parents' nationality, unless the parents were foreign ministers or diplomats residing in the country. The law also established that a child born abroad to a national of the country of either sex could derive nationality from its parent by following procedures for the declaration of Argentine nationality. It contained no specific provisions relating to the loss of citizenship, but the Supreme Court ruled in eleven separate cases between 1867 and 1902 that an Argentine woman who married a foreigner lost her nationality. Likewise, a foreign woman married to an Argentine man gained his nationality.

The Argentine Civil Code, adopted in 1869, followed Catholic canon law, establishing a husband's authority over his family and incapacitating married women. A ruling in 1902 from the Supreme Court found that the act of marriage was not responsible for either acquisition or loss of nationality for a woman, but that it could expatriate her for jurisdictional purposes in legal matters, reinforcing that a wife was required to follow her husband's authority.

From 1914, a married woman, foreign or Argentine, did not derive nationality from her husband's. In that year, the Minister of Foreign Affairs instructed consuls abroad to register Argentine women living abroad and married to foreigners as Argentine nationals and to enter foreign wives of Argentine men into the consulate registries without stating they had Argentine nationality. From 1918, the Ministry of Foreign Affairs instructed that foreign wives could receive Argentine passports, though they were not technically nationals, but had the same civil status as the husband.

In 1926, Argentina revised its Civil Code through Law 11.357 removing the marital authority provision for husbands and expanding women's civil rights. According to the Federal Chamber in Buenos Aires, until the code revision a married woman had technically lost her nationality, but after the change her nationality was independent of her husband's. In 1933, the Argentine delegation to the Pan-American Union's Montevideo conference signed the Inter-American Convention on the Nationality of Women, which became effective in 1934, without legal reservations. In 1947, the Minister of Foreign Affairs issued another circular reiterating that marriage neither bestowed nor relinquished nationalization for a spouse, but that foreign wives could be issued Argentine passports.

=== Guerra Sucia and Military Rule ===
The military juntas and the Guerra Sucia which followed Peron were exceptionally repressive, and the systematic targeting of ordinary citizens created a climate of fear and silence that was the opposite of the mass political participation of the Peron era. Still, they too built their governments around concepts of Argentine identity. The juntas attacked Peronism as a threat to the true capitalist Argentine values, conceiving a more, individualist, and exclusive model of citizenship in which only the qualified had the right to rule, and all others must trust their decisions. The collective Argentine identity was replaced with a more individualist, favour-based model, where the citizen's role was in service of the state rather than vice versa.

Though freedom of expression was nonexistent under the juntas and dissent was a punishable offence, a strong social movement grew out of the military rule. Though each group had its own concerns, most used the rhetoric of citizenship to fight for a return of their political rights. These human rights groups were eventually joined by women's groups and trade unions in early 1982, beginning the return to democracy and civilian rule.

== Contemporary times ==
In 2009, it was ratified that Argentine nationality is inalienable is consolidated through judicial decisions and the interpretation of the Constitution and international treaties.

In 2009, the Electoral Chamber rejected the request of two Argentine citizens who wanted to renounce their nationality to obtain Lithuanian nationality, reaffirming its inalienability as a constitutional and human rights principle. This ruling was based on the fact that nationality is an inalienable right, and that renouncing it would be unconstitutional, since the Argentine Constitution does not contemplate such a possibility for those born in the country.

To make the process less challenging for long-term residents to obtain Argentine citizenship, the country's naturalisation process was simplified and changed in 2010.

Maximiliano Abad (UCR) introduced a bill in the National Congress in 2023 that would have made obtaining nationality with more challenges. Requirements such as taking an oath of allegiance, speaking Spanish, and having more specific grounds for denying naturalisation in cases of criminal history were among the goals of the project. It also implied that nationality could be revoked in cases of fraud or false documentation, in addition to measures to prevent statelessness.

Additional requirements concerning the residency requirement for naturalisation were established in 2025 by the Executive Power's Decree of Necessity and Urgency (DNU) No. 366/2025. It stipulated that applicants could not have left Argentina during the two years of continuous residency, which had to be uninterrupted. This decree sought to restrict cases of people seeking nationality without establishing a stable and permanent presence in Argentina and to strengthen the definition of "residency" in the current legislation.

Significant immigration law reforms have been implemented, which may affect residency status. For example, permanent residents can now lose their status after 12 months of absence, a reduction from 24 months.

Then, on October 6 2025, the requirements were strengthened. The citizenship procedure were not by the Poder Judicial de la Nación anymore, but with a digital platform named as RaDEX system, by the DNM (Dirección Nacional de Migraciones). On the new requirements it is stipulated that the newer applicants must submit, additionally, "Documentation that proves their occupation or means of subsistence".

== Acquisition and loss of nationality ==
=== Entitlement by birth or descent ===
Any person born in Argentine territory acquires Argentine nationality at birth. A notable exception to this rule is for children of persons in the service of a foreign government, such as foreign diplomats. This rule can be also applied to people born in the Falkland Islands, a disputed territory between Argentina and the United Kingdom.

Argentine nationality law follows jus sanguinis; any person over 18 with at least one Argentine parent can opt for Argentine citizenship, and needs only to establish their parentage in front of a federal judge. For a minor child born outside the country, the Argentine parent must present the child's birth certificate before the local Argentine embassy.

Individuals born abroad to an Argentine native parent have the option to acquire Argentine nationality. The procedure can be carried out either at the nearest Argentine consulate (if the person is abroad) or at the RENAPER (National Registry of Persons) or civil registry offices (if the person is in the country).

- Being the child of an Argentine native parent.
- If the person is over 18 years old, the option is solely of the person to make.
- If person is under 18 years old, only the holders of parental authority are authorized to make the option on your behalf.

If the person is a child was born abroad, you can grant them Argentine nationality. The person can visit the nearest consulate to his/her residence to process the Option for Argentine nationality for children of Argentine parents born abroad. This right does not extend to spouses,parents or any other family members of Argentine citizens.

=== Naturalisation ===
Foreigners may naturalize as Argentine citizens after residing in the country for a specified period (generally 2 years and without any exit of the country), have documents that proves their occupation or means of support as determined by Argentine law, and comply with the Article 2, inciso 1 of the Citizenship Law 346 and its amendments. Applicants must declare loyalty to Argentina's democratic system, prove their self-sufficiency without state assistance, hold no criminal record, and fulfill other criteria set by Argentine immigration authorities. Unlike some countries, Argentina does not typically require applicants to renounce their previous nationalities. However, persons convicted of certain criminal acts or offenses against the state may be permanently barred from naturalisation. The requisite period of residence may be subject to certain conditions or exceptions, such as completion of integration courses or marital status to Argentine citizens. Additionally, citizens of specific countries or regions may be exempt from certain requirements or granted special considerations during the naturalisationg process. The number of individuals naturalized as Argentine citizens varies from year to year, reflecting changes in immigration policies and demographic trends.

Naturalisation can be denied if applicants:

- have been in jail for more than 3 years in the last 5 years;
- are under criminal prosecution;
- have an illegitimate source of income. To work without a legal permit is considered an illegitimate source of income for most of the chamber of appeals.

As the naturalisation law has existed essentially unchanged since 1869, subject to later modifications, there are many precedents based on which the Supreme Court is able to resolve almost any immigration-related problem. Nationality has been granted to immigrants who were not legally resident, worked without a legal permit, or entered the country illegally and, in exceptional cases, even to immigrants with criminal records.

The continuous two-year residency requirement means that applicants need to make Argentina their home. However, since applicants enjoy the same civil rights as Argentines, including the right to travel, they may leave the country.

For historical reasons, federal courts are still reluctant to recognize the rights of "irregular" immigrants. They usually request the following requirements related to the abolished law 21.795:

- Proof of Legal residency
- Proof of undertaking Legal work
- Spanish-language ability
- Birth certificate apostilled and translated by a public notary
- Certificate of a clean criminal record from home country
- Certificate of a clean criminal record in Argentina
- CUIT or CUIL number

=== Citizenship by investment ===
The legal framework for acquiring Argentine nationality by investment was established in 2025. Decreto 366/2025 amended the Argentine Citizenship Law that provided that non-citizens may acquire citizenship by naturalisation, regardless of their period of residence in Argentina, if they demonstrate that they have made a "relevant investment" in the country.Decreto 524/2025 subsequently established the procedure for applications and created a role for the Agencia de Programas de Ciudadanía por Inversión (APCI), an autonomous agency operating under the Ministry of Economy.

Under the procedure established by Decreto 524/2025, APCI evaluates whether an applicant’s investment qualifies as "relevant" under criteria established by the Ministry of Economy. It may request reports from the Ministry of Security, the Financial Intelligence Unit (UIF), the National Registry of Recidivism, the National Registry of Persons (RENAPER), the State Intelligence Secretariat (SIDE), and other public or private bodies. APCI then submits a reasoned report recommending approval or rejection to the Dirección Nacional de Migraciones, which makes the final decision within 30 working days of receiving the report.

The government announced the operational launch of the Citizenship by Investment Programme on 2 October 2026, stating that applications would begin to be received during the fourth quarter of 2026. The programme provides two investment mechanisms for the principal applicant: a non-refundable contribution of US$350,000 to the National Treasury, or the subscription of a US$800,000 public security created specifically for the programme. The government stated that the latter instrument would be subject to the applicable regulatory conditions.

The programme also allows the spouse and children of the principal applicant to apply for citizenship, subject to the applicable family relationship and contribution requirements. Spouses and children aged 18 to 25 who are unmarried and have no children may apply through a US$100,000 contribution to the National Treasury, while children under 18 may apply through a US$25,000 contribution. According to the government, a family consisting of a principal applicant, a spouse and two minor children could therefore apply for citizenship through a total contribution of US$500,000.

The investment does not itself guarantee the granting of citizenship. Applications remain subject to identity, security, criminal-record, source-of-funds and financial-transparency checks, and funds must be transferred through the formal financial system in accordance with applicable anti-money-laundering and counter-terrorist-financing requirements. Decreto 524/2025 also provides for the issuance of a CUIT to persons whose citizenship is granted under the investment procedure.

== Dual nationality ==
Dual nationality is accepted in Argentina. Some countries have entered into a reciprocity agreement (Chile, Colombia, Ecuador, El Salvador, Spain, United States until 20 October 1981, Honduras, Italy, Nicaragua, Norway, Panama, and Sweden); Argentine citizens who have been naturalised as citizens of one of these countries enter Argentina with documents of and as citizens of their other nationality and are considered to be such, unless they intend to remain permanently in the country.

Argentine citizens who are also citizens of non-reciprocity countries (e.g., by naturalisation to another citizenship) are recognised only as Argentine citizens within Argentine territory, and would normally enter and leave with their Argentine passport. They can enter, and leave within 180 days, using the travel documents of their other nationality, but if they invoke Argentine nationality they must present their Argentine identity document. After staying more than 180 days they can only leave using their Argentine passport. It is also possible not to mention Argentine citizenship, and enter and leave as a foreign national so long as travel documents do not state place of birth or residence being Argentina.

Despite the rules, it is reported by travellers that there are often difficulties as immigration officials may not be familiar with the rules, and hostility. Two knowledgeable immigration officials have explained the rules as they apply them in a useful discussion. In case of difficulty when travelling without an Argentine passport there is an express passport supply service (with long opening hours) available at airports at additional cost on presenting the Argentine identity document; the process is stated to take 15 minutes, and the passport to be ready in 2 to 6 hours.

== Relinquishment and deprivation ==
Argentine nationality cannot be relinquished, unlike in some other countries where renunciation is possible under certain conditions. Argentine citizenship cannot be renounced and remains with individuals throughout their lifetime. However, it may be revoked if obtained through criminal means, such as fraudulent documentation. Additionally, citizenship may be stripped from individuals engaged in activities deemed harmful to the state, as determined by Argentine law.

== See also ==
- Pre-Columbian era
- Demographics of Argentina
- Immigration to Argentina
- History of the Jews in Argentina
- Afro Argentine
- Welsh settlement in Argentina
- Asian-Argentines

== Bibliography ==
- Augustine-Adams, Kif (Winter 2002). "'She Consents Implicitly': Women's Citizenship, Marriage, and Liberal Political Theory in Late-Nineteenth and Early-Twentieth-Century Argentina". Journal of Women's History. 13 (4). Baltimore, Maryland: Johns Hopkins University Press: 8–30. doi:10.1353/jowh.2002.0001. ISSN 1042-7961. OCLC 357514548. S2CID 145419401. – via Project MUSE (subscription required)
- Criscenti, Joseph T. (August 1961). "Argentine Constitutional History, 1810-1852: A Re-examination". The Hispanic American Historical Review. 41 (3). Durham, North Carolina: Duke University Press: 367–412. doi:10.2307/2510269. ISSN 0018-2168. JSTOR 2510269. OCLC 8553876378.
- Habib, Javier I. (March 2016). "Report on Citizenship Law: Argentina" (PDF). cadmus.eui.eu. Badia Fiesolana: European University Institute. Archived (PDF) from the original on 2 April 2018.
- Honohan, Iseult; Rougier, Nathalie (October 2018). "Global Birthright Citizenship Laws: How Inclusive?". Netherlands International Law Review. 65 (3). The Hague, Netherlands: Springer Science+Business Media, T.M.C. Asser Press: 337–357. doi:10.1007/s40802-018-0115-8. ISSN 1741-6191. OCLC 1189243655. S2CID 149761560.
- "Argentina's Constitution of 1853, Reinstated in 1983, with Amendments through 1994" (PDF). constituteproject.org. Translated by Miller, Jonathan M.; Liao, Fang-Lian. Oxford: Oxford University Press. 4 February 2020. Archived (PDF) from the original on 16 June 2020.
- Pérez-Perdomo, Rogelio (2006). Latin American Lawyers: A Historical Introduction. Redwood City, California: Stanford University Press. ISBN 978-0-8047-6769-9.
- Stevens, Doris (28 November 1933). Report on the Nationality of Women (PDF). 7th Conference of American Republics, Montevideo, December 1933. Washington, D.C.: Inter-American Commission of Women – via Alexander Street Press: Women and Social Movements.
- Vetancourt Aristeguieta, Francisco (1959). "Nacionalidad, naturalización y ciudadania en Hispano-América: Argentina, Bolivia, Colombia" [Nationality, Naturalisation and Citizenship in Hispanic America: Argentina, Bolivia, Colombia] (PDF). Boletin de la Academia de Ciencias Políticas y Sociales (in Spanish) (14). Caracas: Academia de Ciencias Políticas y Sociales: 106–148. ISSN 0798-1457. Archived from the original (PDF) on 11 January 2021.
- "Convention on the Nationality of Women (Inter-American); December 26, 1933". Avalon Project. New Haven, Connecticut: Yale Law School. December 26, 1933.
