= Lynn Wardle =

American lawyer

Lynn D. Wardle
- Born: 15 November 1947 (age 78)
- Education: Brigham Young University (B.A.); Duke Law School (JD)
- Occupation: Law professor
- Employer: Brigham Young University

Lynn D. Wardle is an American Emeritus Professor of Law at the J. Reuben Clark Law School of Brigham Young University. He specializes in family law, constitutional law, and bioethics.

Wardle received his bachelor's degree from BYU in 1971 and graduated cum laude from Duke University Law School in 1974.

== Legal career ==
Wardle was a clerk for Judge John Sirica.

Lynn Wardle submitted an amicus brief to the US Supreme Court on behalf of the state of Utah during the H. L. v. Matheson trial, in support of Utah's parental notification statute requiring doctors to notify the parents of teens undergoing abortions at least 24 hours before the procedure. A discussion of his brief in the June 1983 edition of the West Virginia Law Review mentions him as a professor.

Wardle recognized during the Baehr v. Miike lawsuit that a ruling in favor of the plaintiffs could result in same-sex marriages being legalized in Hawaii, which would force Utah to recognize Hawaiian same-sex marriages (under then-current Utah state law). In January 1995 Wardle wrote memos to Utah State Senator LeRay McAllister and Utah House of Representatives member Norman L. Nielsen, urging them to propose legislation which would explicitly codify an exception for same-sex marriage into Utah's marriage recognition statue. Nielson subsequently drafted and sponsored House Bill 366 to do exactly that, which Utah legislators voted for "overwhelmingly". Wardle's proposed legislation was signed into law in Utah by Governor Mike Leavitt in March 1995, becoming the first of the state-level "DOMA Laws" to go into effect in the United States.

Wardle has testified before congressional committees in favor of the Defense of Marriage Act (DOMA) in 1996 and the Federal Marriage Amendment in April 2005. Wardle was "the only law professor to testify in favor of DOMA in either the House or the Senate". In addition to opposing same-sex marriage, Wardle also opposes allowing same-sex couples to adopt children.

As a representative of the Church of Jesus Christ of Latter-day Saints (LDS Church), Wardle has spoken regularly to the World Congress of Families, an organization that opposes legal protections on the basis of sexual orientation, opposes same sex marriage, and supports policies against homosexuality in Russia. He spoke at the 1997 WCF gathering in Prague at the 2007 WCF gathering in Warsaw, and at the 2017 WCF gathering in Budapest.

Wardle currently holds the Bruce C. Hafen Professorship at the J. Reuben Clark Law School at Brigham Young University.

Wardle was the General Secretary of the International Society for Family Law (ISFL) and later its president. He remains on its Executive Council. He also edits the Society's web site.

== Mormon studies ==
In 1994 Wardle published an article in the Journal of Book of Mormon Studies on what the Book of Mormon says about dissent.
