= Norman Nielsen =

Norman Nielsen is the name of:

- Norman Nielson (1928–2002), South African footballer
- Norman L. Nielsen, American politician

== See also ==
- Nielsen Norman Group, American software company
