= Literature on the Amish =

This article contains references to literature on the Amish in the following field: Education, Health, Music and Tourism. There is also a list of list of literature in the article Amish.

== Education ==
- Biedrzycki, Lisa (2006). "'Conformed to This World': A Challenge to the Continued Justification of the Wisconsin v. Yoder Education Exception in a Changed Old Order Amish Society". Temple Law Review. 79 (1): 249–78. ISSN 0899-8086.
- Cheng, D. G. W. (2010). "Wisconsin v. Yoder: Respecting Children's Rights and Why Yoder Would Soon Be Overturned". doi:10.2139/ssrn.1636503.
- Fischer, Sara and Stahl, Rachel K: "Amish School (People's Place Booklet, No. 6)", Intercourse, PA, 1997.
- Kurland, Philip B. (1973). "The Supreme Court, Compulsory Education, and the First Amendment's Religion Clauses". West Virginia Law Review. 75 (3): 213–45.
- Gordon, James D. (1996). "Wisconsin v. Yoder and Religious Liberty". Texas Law Review. 74 (6): 1237–40.
- Wittmer, Joe (1970). "An Educational Controversy: The Old Order Amish Schools". The Phi Delta Kappan. 52 (3): 142–5. JSTOR 20372841.
- McConnell, D. L.; Hurst, C. E. (2006). "No ?Rip Van Winkles? Here: Amish Education Since Wisconsin v. Yoder". Anthropology & Education Quarterly. 37 (3): 236–254. doi:10.1525/aeq.2006.37.3.236. S2CID 143202432.
- Katz, M. S. (1977). "Compulsion and the Discourse on Compulsory School Attendance". Educational Theory. 27 (3): 179–185. doi:10.1111/j.1741-5446.1977.tb00770.x.
- Pullman, Marc H. (1973). "Wisconsin v. Yoder: The Right to Be Different—First Amendment Exemption for Amish under the Free Exercise Clause". DePaul Law Review. 22: 539–51.
- Huntington, Gertrude Enders (1994). "Persistence and Change in Amish Education". In Kraybill, Donald B.; Olshan, Marc Alan (eds.). The Amish Struggle with Modernity. University Press of New England. pp. 77–95. ISBN 978-0-87451-684-5.
- Ruxin, Paul T. (1967). "The Right Not to Be Modern Men: The Amish and Compulsory Education". Virginia Law Review. 53 (4): 925–52. doi:10.2307/1071423. JSTOR 1071423.
- McVicker, Debra D. (1985). "The Interest of the Child in the Home Education Question: Wisconsin v. Yoder Re-examined". Indiana Law Review. 18 (3): 711–29.

== Health ==
=== Bipolar affective disorder ===
- Kelsoe, J. R.; Ginns, E. I.; Egeland, J. A.; Gerhard, D. S.; Goldstein, A. M.; Bale, S. J.; Pauls, D. L.; Long, R. T.; Kidd, K. K.; Conte, G.; Housman, D. E.; Paul, S. M. (1989). "Re-evaluation of the linkage relationship between chromosome 11p loci and the gene for bipolar affective disorder in the Old Order Amish". Nature. 342 (6247): 238–243. Bibcode:1989Natur.342..238K. doi:10.1038/342238a0. PMID 2682265. S2CID 4331268.
- Ginns, E. I.; Ott, J.; Egeland, J. A.; Allen, C. R.; Fann, C. S. J.; Pauls, D. L.; Weissenbachoff, J.; Carulli, J. P.; Falls, K. M.; Keith, T. P.; Paul, S. M. (1996). "A genome-wide search for chromosomal loci linked to bipolar affective disorder in the Old Order Amish". Nature Genetics. 12 (4): 431–435. doi:10.1038/ng0496-431. PMID 8630500. S2CID 13156440.
- Ginns, E. I.; St Jean, P.; Philibert, R. A.; Galdzicka, M.; Damschroder-Williams, P.; Thiel, B.; Long, R. T.; Ingraham, L. J.; et al. (1998). "A genome-wide search for chromosomal loci linked to mental health wellness in relatives at high risk for bipolar affective disorder among the Old Order Amish". Proceedings of the National Academy of Sciences of the United States of America. 95 (26): 15531–15536. Bibcode:1998PNAS...9515531G. doi:10.1073/pnas.95.26.15531. PMC 28077. PMID 9861003.
- Blackwood, D. H.; Visscher, P. M.; Muir, W. J. (2001). "Genetic studies of bipolar affective disorder in large families". The British Journal of Psychiatry. 178 (Suppl 41): S134–S136. doi:10.1192/bjp.178.41.s134. PMID 11388952.

=== Cystic fibrosis ===
- Wood Klinger, K. (1983). "Cystic fibrosis in the Ohio Amish: Gene frequency and founder effect". Human Genetics. 65 (2): 94–98. doi:10.1007/BF00286641. PMID 6654341. S2CID 189889167.
- Knowles, M. R.; Barnett, T. B.; McConkie-Rosell, A.; Sawyer, C.; Kahler, S. G. (1989). "Mild cystic fibrosis in a consanguineous family". Annals of Internal Medicine. 110 (8): 599–605. doi:10.7326/0003-4819-110-8-599. PMID 2930093.
- Henderson, J. F.; Anbar, R. D. (2009). "Care for Amish and Mennonite children with cystic fibrosis: A case series". BMC Pediatrics. 9: 4. doi:10.1186/1471-2431-9-4. PMC 2637265. PMID 19146658.
- McCrae, I. S.; Hickman, A. J. (1990). "Air pollution from traffic in topographically complex locations". The Science of the Total Environment. 93: 331–338. Bibcode:1990ScTEn..93..331M. doi:10.1016/0048-9697(90)90124-D. PMID 1694304.

=== Diabetes ===
- Hsueh, W. C.; Mitchell, B. D.; Aburomia, R.; Pollin, T.; Sakul, H.; Gelder Ehm, M.; Michelsen, B. K.; Wagner, M. J.; St Jean, P. L.; Knowler, W. C.; Burns, D. K.; Bell, C. J.; Shuldiner, A. R. (2000). "Diabetes in the Old Order Amish: Characterization and heritability analysis of the Amish Family Diabetes Study". Diabetes Care. 23 (5): 595–601. doi:10.2337/diacare.23.5.595. PMID 10834415.
- Hsueh, W. C.; St Jean, P. L.; Mitchell, B. D.; Pollin, T. I.; Knowler, W. C.; Ehm, M. G.; Bell, C. J.; Sakul, H.; Wagner, M. J.; Burns, D. K.; Shuldiner, A. R. (2003). "Genome-wide and fine-mapping linkage studies of type 2 diabetes and glucose traits in the Old Order Amish: Evidence for a new diabetes locus on chromosome 14q11 and confirmation of a locus on chromosome 1q21-q24". Diabetes. 52 (2): 550–557. doi:10.2337/diabetes.52.2.550. PMID 12540634.
- Rampersaud, E.; Damcott, C. M.; Fu, M.; Shen, H.; McArdle, P.; Shi, X.; Shelton, J.; Yin, J.; Chang, Y. -P. C.; Ott, S. H.; Zhang, L.; Zhao, Y.; Mitchell, B. D.; O'Connell, J.; Shuldiner, A. R. (2007). "Identification of Novel Candidate Genes for Type 2 Diabetes from a Genome-Wide Association Scan in the Old Order Amish: Evidence for Replication from Diabetes-Related Quantitative Traits and from Independent Populations". Diabetes. 56 (12): 3053–3062. doi:10.2337/db07-0457. PMID 17846126.

=== Happiness ===
- Biswas-Diener, R.; Vittersø, J.; Diener, E. (2005). "Most People are Pretty Happy, but There is Cultural Variation: The Inughuit, the Amish, and the Maasai". Journal of Happiness Studies. 6 (3): 205–226. doi:10.1007/s10902-005-5683-8. S2CID 143987250.

=== Healthcare ===
- Adams, C. E.; Leverland, M. B. (1986). "The Effects of Religious Beliefs on the Health Care Practices of the Amish". The Nurse Practitioner. 11 (3): 58, 63, 67. doi:10.1097/00006205-198603000-00008. PMID 3446212.

=== Inbreeding ===
- Khoury, M. J.; Cohen, B. H.; Diamond, E. L.; Chase, G. A.; McKusick, V. A. (1987). "Inbreeding and prereproductive mortality in the Old Order Amish. I. Genealogic epidemiology of inbreeding". American Journal of Epidemiology. 125 (3): 453–461. doi:10.1093/oxfordjournals.aje.a114551. PMID 3812451.
- Khoury, M. J.; Cohen, B. H.; Newill, C. A.; Bias, W.; McKusick, V. A. (1987). "Inbreeding and prereproductive mortality in the Old Order Amish. II. Genealogic epidemiology of prereproductive mortality". American Journal of Epidemiology. 125 (3): 462–472. doi:10.1093/oxfordjournals.aje.a114552. PMID 3812452.
- Khoury, M. J.; Cohen, B. H.; Diamond, E. L.; Chase, G. A.; McKusick, V. A. (1987). "Inbreeding and prereproductive mortality in the Old Order Amish. III. Direct and indirect effects of inbreeding". American Journal of Epidemiology. 125 (3): 473–483. doi:10.1093/oxfordjournals.aje.a114553. PMID 3812453.
- Puffenberger, E. G. (2003). "Genetic heritage of the Old Order Mennonites of southeastern Pennsylvania". American Journal of Medical Genetics. 121C (1): 18–31. doi:10.1002/ajmg.c.20003. PMID 12888983. S2CID 25317649.
- Agarwala, R.; Schäffer, A. A.; Tomlin, J. F. (2001). "Towards a complete North American Anabaptist Genealogy II: Analysis of inbreeding". Human Biology. 73 (4): 533–545. doi:10.1353/hub.2001.0045. PMID 11512680. S2CID 42236600.
- Jackson, C. E.; Symon, W. E.; Pruden, E. L.; Kaehr, I. M.; Mann, J. D. (1968). "Consanguinity and blood group distribution in an Amish Isolate". American Journal of Human Genetics. 20 (6): 522–527. PMC 1706380. PMID 5714527.
- Dorsten, L. E.; Hotchkiss, L.; King, T. M. (1996). "Consanguineous Marriage and Early Childhood Mortality in an Amish Settlement". Sociological Focus. 29 (2): 179–185. doi:10.1080/00380237.1996.10570639.

=== Obesity ===
- Hsueh, W. C.; Mitchell, B. D.; Schneider, J. L.; St Jean, P. L.; Pollin, T. I.; Ehm, M. G.; Wagner, M. J.; Burns, D. K.; Sakul, H.; Bell, C. J.; Shuldiner, A. R. (2001). "Genome-wide scan of obesity in the Old Order Amish". The Journal of Clinical Endocrinology and Metabolism. 86 (3): 1199–1205. doi:10.1210/JCEM.86.3.7358. PMID 11238509.
- Bassett, D. R.; Schneider, P. L.; Huntington, G. E. (2004). "Physical Activity in an Old Order Amish Community". Medicine & Science in Sports & Exercise. 36 (1): 79–85. doi:10.1249/01.MSS.0000106184.71258.32. PMID 14707772. S2CID 17875860.
- Bassett, D. R.; Tremblay, M. S.; Esliger, D. W.; Copeland, J. L.; Barnes, J. D.; Huntington, G. E. (2007). "Physical Activity and Body Mass Index of Children in an Old Order Amish Community". Medicine & Science in Sports & Exercise. 39 (3): 410–415. doi:10.1249/mss.0b013e31802d3aa7. PMID 17473766.

== Music ==
- Umble, John (1939). "The Old Order Amish, Their Hymns and Hymn Tunes". The Journal of American Folklore. 52 (203): 82–95. doi:10.2307/536013. JSTOR 536013.
- Jackson, G. P. (1945). "The Strange Music of the Old Order Amish". The Musical Quarterly. XXXI (3): 275–288. doi:10.1093/mq/XXXI.3.275.
- Thompson, Chad L. (1996). "Yodeling of the Indiana Swiss Amish". Anthropological Linguistics. 38 (3): 495–520. JSTOR 30028600.

== Tourism ==
- Buck, Roy C. (1978). "Boundary maintenance revisited: tourist experience in an Old Order Amish community". Rural Sociology. 43 (2): 221–34. ISSN 0036-0112.
- Fagance, Michael (2001). "Tourism as a Protective Barrier for Old Order Amish and Mennonite Communities". In Smith, Valene L.; Brent, Maryann (eds.). Hosts & Guests Revisited: Tourism Issues of the 21st Century. Putnam Valley, NY: Cognizant Communication Corporation. pp. 201–9. ISBN 1-882345-29-0.
- Chhabra, D. (2009). "How They See Us: Perceived Effects of Tourist Gaze on the Old Order Amish". Journal of Travel Research. 49: 93–105. doi:10.1177/0047287509336475. S2CID 145420964.
- Buck, R. C. (1977). "The ubiquitous tourist brochure explorations in its intended and unintended use". Annals of Tourism Research. 4 (4): 195–207. doi:10.1016/0160-7383(77)90038-X.
- Besculides, A.; Lee, M. E.; McCormick, P. J. (2002). "Residents' perceptions of the cultural benefits of tourism". Annals of Tourism Research. 29 (2): 303–319. doi:10.1016/S0160-7383(01)00066-4.
- Pearce, P. L.; Moscardo, G. M. (1986). "The Concept of Authenticity in Tourist Experiences". Journal of Sociology. 22: 121–132. doi:10.1177/144078338602200107. S2CID 144480139.
- Boynton, L. L. (1986). "The effect of tourism on Amish quilting design". Annals of Tourism Research. 13 (3): 451–465. doi:10.1016/0160-7383(86)90030-7.
- Olshan, Marc A. (1991). "The Opening of Amish Society: Cottage Industry as Trojan Horse". Human Organization. 50 (4): 378–84. doi:10.17730/humo.50.4.w2233n3584g1g236.
