= Bruce C. Hafen =

American religious leader, attorney and academic

First Quorum of the Seventy
- April 6, 1996 – October 2, 2010
- Called by: Gordon B. Hinckley
- End reason: Designated an emeritus general authority

Emeritus General Authority
- October 2, 2010
- Called by: Thomas S. Monson

Personal details
- Born: Bruce Clark Hafen; October 30, 1940 (age 85); St. George, Utah, United States

Bruce Clark Hafen (born October 30, 1940, in St. George, Utah) is an American attorney, academic and religious leader. He has been a general authority of the Church of Jesus Christ of Latter-day Saints (LDS Church) since 1996.

== Early life ==
Hafen was raised in St. George, Utah by Orval Hafen and his wife, the former Ruth Clark. Hafen's father was a lawyer and State Senator. His father died while he was a youth. After his father's death his mother was an instructor in the French language at Dixie College. In 1960, Hafen received an associate degree from Dixie College (now Utah Tech University). He then served a mission for the LDS Church in the West German Mission from 1960 to 1963. Among Hafen's mission companions was Marlin K. Jensen, who would later serve as a general authority at the same time as Hafen. Hafen went on to earn a bachelor's degree from Brigham Young University (BYU), and a J.D. from the University of Utah.

== Legal career ==
After practicing law in Salt Lake City, Utah for four years, he became an assistant to BYU president Dallin H. Oaks. He was on the original faculty of BYU's J. Reuben Clark Law School (JRCLS), founded in 1973. His teaching and research focused on constitutional, education, and family law—particularly the legal rights of children. His professional scholarship was published in such journals as the Harvard Law Review, Harvard International Law Journal, Michigan Law Review, Duke Law Journal, Brigham Young University Law Review, Ohio State Law Journal, and the American Bar Association Journal. Two of his articles were cited in opinions of the U.S. Supreme Court. One of his central insights about children's rights was that the legal system “limits children’s [legal] autonomy in the short run in order to maximize their development of actual autonomy in the long run. . . . [To] short-circuit this process by legally granting [autonomy]—rather than actually teaching autonomous capacity--to children ignores the realities of education and child development to the point of abandoning children to a mere illusion of real autonomy."

From 1976 to 1978, Hafen was the director of evaluation and research for the LDS Church's Correlation Department. He then served as president of Ricks College (now Brigham Young University-Idaho) from 1978 to 1985. At the time Hafen took the helm at Ricks it had an enrollment of 6,000 students. During this time, he was also president of the American Association of Presidents of Independent Colleges and Universities (AAPICU) and a Commissioner on the Northwest Commission on Colleges and Universities—the regional accrediting authority for higher education institutions in the seven Northwestern states. While president of Ricks, Hafen taught at least one class each semester.

Hafen was Dean of the JRCLS from 1985 to 1989. While there he helped to create an international law society for LDS Church members and others who were lawyers. By 2017, the law society had over 10,000 members in more than 100 chapters, a third of them outside the U.S. Hafen also raised donated funds to establish a series of endowed professorships to support law faculty scholarship. The JRCLS later created an endowed professorship and an endowed annual lectureship in Hafen's name.

From 1989 to 1996, he was the provost at BYU. As provost, he worked with the faculty to develop a policy that appropriately blended BYU's institutional academic freedom as a religious university with the faculty's individual academic freedom, along with a new policy statement describing “The Aims of a BYU Education.”

== LDS Church service ==
Hafen has served in several leadership positions in the LDS Church over the years. This included serving as a counselor in a bishopric, a counselor in a stake presidency, and as a regional representative.

Hafen was an active LDS Church general authority from 1996 to 2010. His assignments included serving as president of the church's Australia/New Zealand and Europe Central areas. He also served in the presidency of North America Central Area and as an executive director or assistant executive director at church headquarters over the Church History, Temple, and Priesthood departments.

He has published several books and numerous articles on religious topics, including the Atonement of Jesus Christ, marriage, faith, Christian discipleship, and dealing with ambiguity. Two of his books won the year's best book award from Deseret Book—The Broken Heart in 1989 and A Disciple's Life: The Biography of Neal A. Maxwell in 2002.

At an Evergreen International conference in 2009, Hafen urged LDS Church leaders and members to reach out in love to those with same-gender attraction. On October 2, 2010, Hafen was released from the First Quorum of the Seventy and designated an emeritus general authority. He served as president of the St. George Utah Temple from 2010 to 2013.

== Personal life ==
Hafen met his wife, Marie Kartchner, in a religion class at BYU. They were married in 1964 in the St. George Temple. Hafen and his wife are the parents of seven children. She has a master's degree in English, which she taught at BYU, both while Bruce was getting his Juris Doctor degree and also starting in 1980. She served on the LDS Church's Young Women General Board from 1987 to 1993. The Hafens have co-authored three books. They also jointly published an article in the Ensign in 2007 explaining the co-equal leadership of the family by men and women that was important to the development of this idea within the restored gospel of Jesus Christ.

== Published works ==
- —— (1986). The Believing Heart: Four Essays on Faith. Salt Lake City, Utah: Bookcraft.
- —— (1989). The Broken Heart: Applying the Atonement to Life's Experiences. Salt Lake City, Utah: Deseret Book.
- ——; Hafen, Marie K. (1994). The Belonging Heart: The Atonement and Relationships with God and Family. Salt Lake City, Utah: Deseret Book.
- —— (2002). A Disciple's Life: The Biography of Neal A. Maxwell. Salt Lake City, Utah: Deseret Book.
- —— (2005). Covenant Hearts: Marriage and the Joy of Human Love. Salt Lake City, Utah: Deseret Book. ISBN 978-1-59038-536-4.
- —— (2008). Broken Hearts: Applying the Atonement to Life's Experiences. Salt Lake City, Utah: Deseret Book.
- ——; Hafen, Marie K. (2015). The Contrite Spirit: How the Temple Helps Us Apply Christ's Atonement. Salt Lake City, Utah: Deseret Book.
- ——; Hafen, Marie K. (2018). Faith Is Not Blind. Salt Lake City, Utah: Deseret Book.

Academic offices
Preceded by Henry B. Eyring	President of Ricks College; 1978—1985	Succeeded by Joe J. Christensen
