= Richard Wilkins (law) =

Richard G. Wilkins (December 12, 1952 – November 26, 2012) was an American lawyer and proponent of a socially conservative view of marriage and the family. He was the Robert W. Barker Professor of Law at the J. Reuben Clark Law School which is part of Brigham Young University (BYU) until his retirement. He also served as the director of the World Family Policy Center at BYU which was affiliated with the Clark Law School and the David M. Kennedy Center for International Studies. He was an assistant to the solicitor general of the United States in the 1980s.

Wilkins was a member of the Church of Jesus Christ of Latter-day Saints. He served a mission for the church in Italy in the 1970s.

Wilkins received a Joseph Fielding Smith scholarship to BYU. He graduated at the top of his class in the BYU School of Fine Arts and Communication. He earned his bachelor's degree in journalism. As a student at J. Reuben Clark Law School he was the top of his class and was the editor-in-chief of the Brigham Young University law review. He then worked as a law clerk for Robert A. Ainsworth Jr.

Wilkins was the Assistant Solicitor General under Rex E. Lee. While in this position he argued eight cases before the Supreme Court. He wrote the brief that Lee used to argue the government case in Akron Center for Reproductive Health v. The State of Ohio. He also drafted the legislation regulating abortion passed by the Utah legislature in the early 1990s.

As early as 1978 Wilkins wrote a paper on marriage law in Italy. However Prior to the mid-1990s Wilkins focused much of his work on land issues, such as public domain.

In 1996 Wilkins went to an international conference on the family at Istanbul, where he delivered a paper on the importance of language in UN policy statements. Wilkins has written a book with Esther Rasband about his work at the Istanbul Conference.

Wilkins was the director of the World Family Policy Center at BYU. He was also the founder of Defend Marriage, a group with the goal of opposing the legalization of same-sex marriage. He was a member of the organizing committee for the UN conference on the family held in Doha, Qatar.

Wilkins participated in several World Policy Center Forums held in Provo, Utah.

Wilkins wrote several articles and books on international law, the definition of the family, laws on abortion and other related topics. He also wrote a piece for Marriage and Same Sex Unions a Debate by Lynn D. Wardle.

At the time he went to Istanbul Wilkins was serving as an LDS Bishop in a ward in Provo.

Wilkins was attacked by Jack Huberman for being willing to work with fundamentalist Muslims against same-sex marriage and women's rights.

Wilkins was also a stage actor. From 1984 until 2011 he played Ebenezer Scrooge in the annual Hale Center Theatre production of Dickens "A Christmas Carol".

After his retirement from BYU Wilkins became the Managing Director of the Doha International Institute for Family Studies and Development.

Wilkins was survived by his wife Melany and four children.
