= Neeleman =

Neeleman is a surname. Notable people with the surname include:

- Ad Neeleman (born 1964), Dutch linguist
- David Neeleman (born 1959), Brazilian-American businessman
- Hannah Neeleman, née Hannah Wright (born 1990), American social media personality and businesswoman
- Mark Neeleman (born 1959), Dutch sailor
- Stanley D. Neeleman (born 1943), American Mormon leader and lawyer
- Wim Neeleman, Dutch curler and curling coach
