= Stanley D. Neeleman =

American lawyer

Stanley D. Neeleman (born 1943) is the Terry L. Crapo professor of law at the J. Reuben Clark Law School of Brigham Young University. Neeleman is an expert in tax and estate planning law. He has also served in many positions in the Church of Jesus Christ of Latter-day Saints (LDS Church). He will soon began service as president of the São Paulo Brazil Temple.

Neeleman was born in Salt Lake City. He has a bachelor's degree from Westminster College and an MA from George Washington University. He received his JD from the University of Denver where he was also the editor-in-chief of the Denver Law Review.

Neeleman has worked with the Internal Revenue Service and as an academic fellow with various national trust and estate law bodies. He has been a member of the BYU Law School faculty since 1975.

In the LDS Church, Neeleman has served in many positions including as president of the Brazil São Paulo South Mission and as a bishop. Neeleman is married to the former Sheryl Lynn Hunt.

Neeleman is the author of Estate Planning for the Healthy, Wealthy Family. He also co-authored books on the probate laws of Utah and Idaho with H. Reese Hansen.
