= Loveless =

Loveless may refer to:

== Comics and literature ==
- Loveless (comics), a comic book series by Brian Azzarello, Marcelo Frusin, Danijel Zezelj, and Werther Dell'Edera
- Loveless (manga), a manga series by Yun Kouga
- Loveless (novel), a 2020 novel by Alice Oseman
- Loveless, a fictional poetry book and play adaptation in the Final Fantasy franchise, especially Crisis Core: Final Fantasy VII

== Music ==
=== Groups ===
- Loveless (band), a rock duo
- Loveless, a duo project of Nana Kitade and Taizo

=== Albums ===
- Loveless (album), a 1991 album by My Bloody Valentine
- Loveless, a 2013 album by Dream On, Dreamer

=== Songs ===
- "Hard Feelings/Loveless", a 2017 song by Lorde
- "Love Less", a song by New Order from Technique, 1989
- "Loveless", a song by Luna Sea from Mother, 1994
- "Loveless", a song by Kittie from Until the End, 2004
- "Loveless", a song by Said the Whale from Little Mountain, 2012
- "Loveless", a 2009 song by Tomohisa Yamashita
- "Loveless", a song by X Ambassadors from VHS, 2015
- "Loveless", a song by Pvris from Use Me, 2020

== Other uses ==
- Loveless (film), a 2017 Russian, French, Belgian, and German drama film
- Loveless (surname)
- Loveless, Alabama, an unincorporated community in Alabama, United States
- Loveless Cafe, a restaurant in Nashville, Tennessee, United States
