= Frederick Gedicks =

Frederick Mark Gedicks
- Born: March 17, 1953 (age 73)
- Education: Brigham Young University (BA); USC Gould School of Law (JD)
- Occupation: Law professor
- Employer: Brigham Young University

Frederick Mark Gedicks (born May 17, 1953) is an expert on religion and law, especially the role of religion in public life. He is a professor of law at the J. Reuben Clark Law School at Brigham Young University (BYU).

== Biography ==
Gedicks received his bachelor's degree in economics from BYU. He then earned his JD from the University of Southern California.

Gedicks is a full-fledged supporter of the Religious Freedom Restoration Act, and has condemned the Rehnquist Court for not placing any limits on government power.

Gedicks has written two books. One is The Rhetoric of Church and State: A Critical Analysis of Religious Law Jurisprudence. (Durham: Duke University Press, 1995). The other is Choosing the Dream: The future of Religion in American Public Life written with Dr. Roger A. Hendrix, Sr.

Gedicks is an active Latter-day Saint.

Gedicks rejects the use of the government to promote religion.

Gedicks currently holds the Guy Anderson Chair at the J. Reuben Clark Law School. He was selected as the 2024 American Constitution Society Faculty Advisor of the Year.

== Sources ==
- "2 BYU professors named to chairs in law school". Deseret News. October 25, 2005.
- "Public Life and Hostility to Religion" by Frederick Mark Gedicks in Virginia Law Review, Vol. 78, No. 3 (Apr., 1992), pp. 671–696, author intro.
