= Irving Younger =

American lawyer (1932–1988)

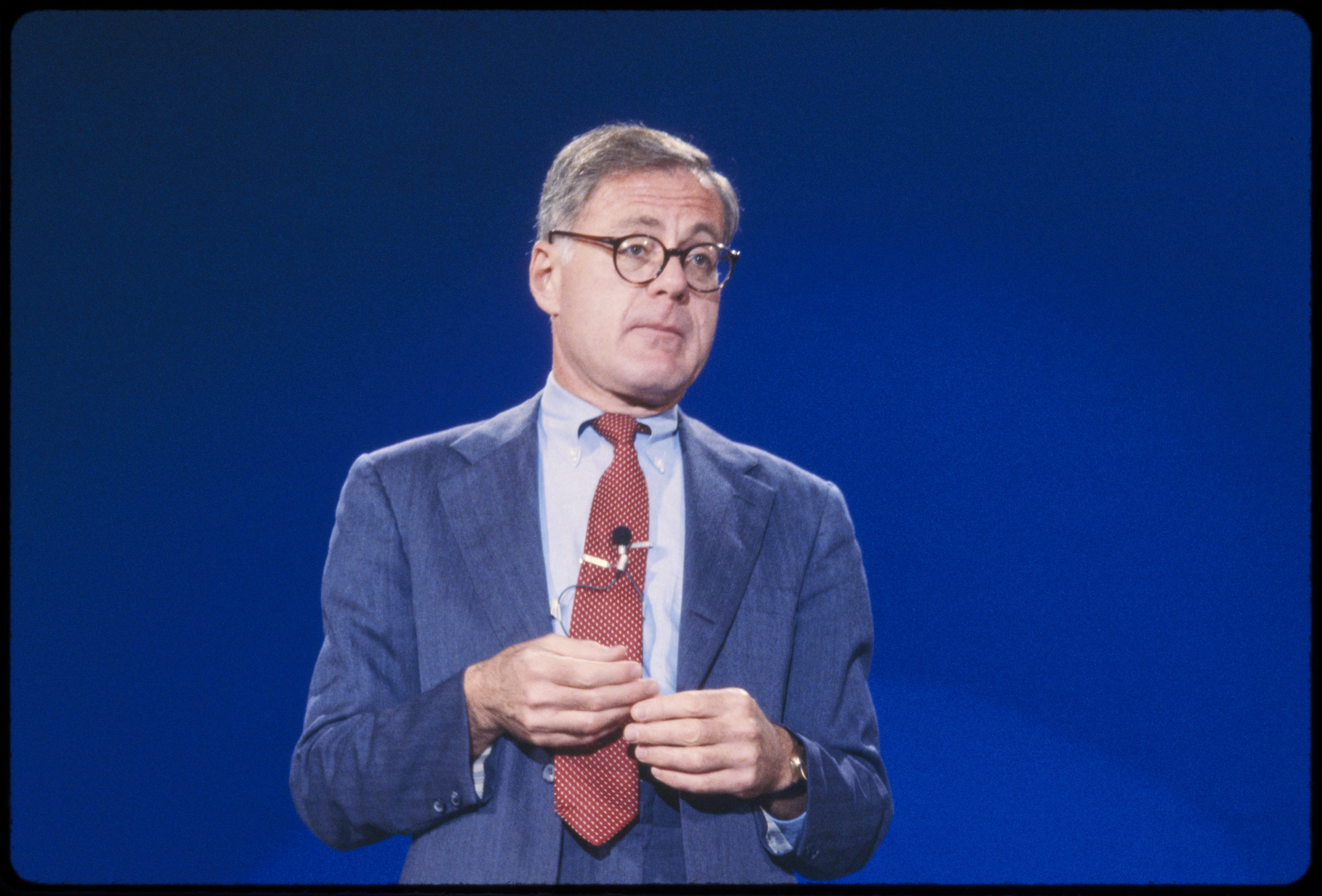
Younger in 1981

Irving Younger (born Irving Yoskowitz; November 30, 1932 – March 13, 1988) was an American lawyer, law professor, judge, and writer. He is well known among lawyers and law students for his energetic talks on effective trial advocacy and legal history.

== Biography ==
Younger was born in New York City and attended high school at the Bronx High School of Science, followed by undergraduate studies at Harvard University, from which he graduated in 1953. After serving for two years in the United States Army, Younger obtained his Juris Doctor degree from New York University Law School in 1958. He was married to Judith T. Younger (née Weintraub), who was also a lawyer and law professor.

After graduating from law school, Younger worked briefly as a litigation associate at the New York law firm of Paul, Weiss, Rifkind, Wharton & Garrison, before becoming an Assistant United States Attorney in the Southern District of New York. As an Assistant U.S. Attorney, Younger handled criminal trials and appeals. Younger's most famous case as a prosecutor was the trial of singer Pete Seeger for contempt of Congress after Seeger refused to answer questions about alleged Communist Party membership and activities. Seeger was convicted and sentenced to prison, but the Court of Appeals reversed the conviction on a technicality; Younger reports in his autobiography, Some of My Life, that he was not upset when that occurred. After several years in the U.S. Attorney's office, Younger opened a practice as a private defense lawyer, partnering with his wife and handling a wide variety of cases.

In 1968, Younger was unexpectedly elected as a judge of the New York City Civil Court, a lower-level trial court, from a district in Manhattan, running on the Democratic, Liberal, and Conservative party lines. As a judge, Younger presided over both civil and criminal cases and authored more than a dozen published opinions.

In 1974, Younger resigned from his judgeship to move upstate, accepting a professorship (the Samuel S. Leibowitz Professor of Trial Techniques) at Cornell Law School. From 1981 to 1984, Younger was a member of the Washington, D.C. law firm of Williams & Connolly, and during the same period also taught as an adjunct professor at Georgetown University Law Center. From 1984 until his death in 1988, he was a professor at the University of Minnesota Law School. Younger specialized in the fields of evidence law and trial advocacy, and authored casebooks and training materials for lawyers in these subjects. His legal textbook Principles of Evidence, originally co-authored with Michael Goldsmith and more recently also with David Sonenshein, is currently in its 5th edition. He was a well-known lecturer to audiences of lawyers and law students, and more than thirty years after his death, tapes of his continuing legal education talks remain in frequent use, prized for their wit and theatrics as well as their substance and insight.

For several years, Younger authored a column on improving legal writing. He also wrote and lectured widely about famous cases in legal history. A selection of his writings, including his article, "The Trial of Alger Hiss", originally published in Commentary (August 1975); the story behind the case of Erie Railroad v. Tompkins; and the obscenity prosecution of James Joyce's book Ulysses were collected in an anthology: The Irving Younger Collection: Wisdom & Wit from the Master of Trial Advocacy, published by the American Bar Association in 2011.

Younger died of pancreatic cancer in 1988, at the age of 55. His wife remained on the faculty at Minnesota and taught there until 2022.

== Work experience ==
- Private law firm in New York (1958-1960)
- Assistant US Attorney (1960-1962)
- Opened his own law firm with his wife
- Civil court judge in New York City (1969-1974)
- Concurrently taught law at NYU
- Cornell Law faculty (1974-1981)
- Private Law firm in Washington, DC (Williams and Connolly) (1981-1984)
- Concurrently taught at Georgetown University Law Center
- Law professor at University of Minnesota (1984-1988)
- Faculty at The Professional Education Group http://proedgroup.com/professor/irving-younger/

== The 10 Commandments of Cross Examination ==
1. Be brief.
2. Short questions, plain words.
3. Always ask leading questions.
4. Don't ask a question to which you do not know the answer.
5. Listen to the witness's answers.
6. Don't quarrel with the witness.
7. Don't allow the witness to repeat his direct testimony.
8. Don't permit the witness to explain his answers.
9. Don't ask the "one question too many."
10. Save the ultimate point of your cross for summation.

== Sources ==
- Labaton, Stephen (March 15, 1988). "Irving Younger, Lawyer, 55, Dies; Judge, Law Professor and Author". The New York Times.
