= Jane Hansen Lassetter =

American nurse

Jane Hansen Lassetter is an American nurse and academic administrator serving as dean of the BYU College of Nursing.

Lassetter holds associates, bachelor's and master's degrees in nursing from BYU. She earned one degree in December 1981. She has a Ph.D. in nursing from the Oregon Health and Science University and a graduate certificate in healthcare ethnics from Creighton University.

From 1992-2002 Lassetter worked at Primary Children's Medical Center in Salt Lake City. She has been on BYU's faculty since 2002.

In 2019 she was made a fellow of the American Academy of Nursing. She has been the president of the International Family Nursing Association and the Western Institute of Nursing. Her research has focused on Native Hawaiian and Pacific Islander populations in Hawaii, Nevada and Utah with emphasis on how migration effects their health. Much of her work has focused on obesity prevention.

Her older brother H. Reese Hansen was previously the dean of BYU's law school.
