= H. Reese Hansen =

American legal academic (born 1942)

H. Reese Hansen (born April 8, 1942) is an American legal academic. He is the longest serving dean of the J. Reuben Clark Law School at Brigham Young University having served as dean from 1989 until 2004.

Hansen received a bachelor's degree from Utah State University and a law degree from the University of Utah. After practicing law with the firm of Strong, Poelman & Fox in Salt Lake City for two years, Hansen joined the BYU Law School faculty in 1974.

Hansen's main specialties have been probate and trust law. He has written books on the probate laws of Utah and Idaho with Stanley D. Neeleman.

Since serving as dean of the J. Reuben Clark Law School Hansen has served as a member of the Advisory Committee on Professionalism of the Utah Supreme Court. In 2010 Hansen served as president of the Association of American Law Schools (AALS). Hansen taught at the J. Reuben Clark Law School, holding the Howard W. Hunter Chair.

Hansen is a member of the Church of Jesus Christ of Latter-day Saints. His sister is Jane Hansen Lassetter.
