= Michael Goldsmith =

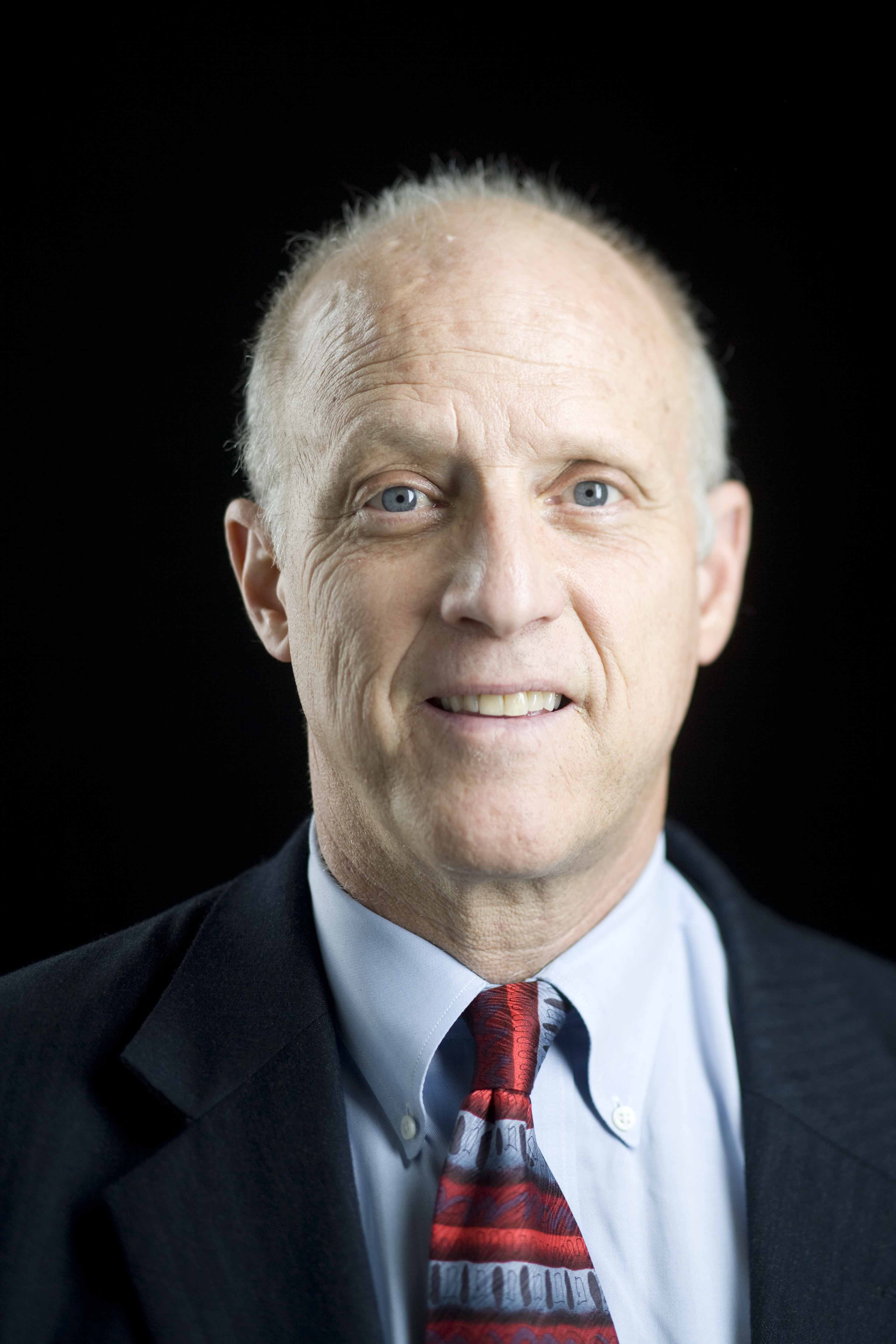
- Born: March 6, 1951; Tel Aviv, Israel
- Died: November 1, 2009 (aged 58); New York City
- Cause of death: ALS
- Citizenship: United States; Israel
- Education: Cornell University (B.S., J.D.)
- Occupations: Attorney, law professor, ALS advocate
- Employer: Brigham Young University
- Known for: RICO law; Evidence textbook; extensive legal writings; ALS advocacy work
- Title: Woodruff J. Deem Professor of Law
- Spouse: Carolyn Goldsmith
- Awards: Michael Goldsmith Outstanding Trial Lawyer Award (2008); Professor of the Year 1985-1986; 1991-1992; 1998-1999; 2005-2006; 2007-2008; 2008-2009

Michael Goldsmith (March 6, 1951—November 1, 2009) was a law professor at Brigham Young University's J. Reuben Clark Law School.

== Early life and education ==
Michael Goldsmith was born March 6, 1951, in Tel Aviv, Israel and immigrated to the United States of America with his family in June 1955. He attended Cornell University in Ithaca, New York, receiving a B.S. with a concentration in Industrial & Labor Relations and Political Science in 1972. In 1975, he obtained a J.D. degree from Cornell Law School, in the process earning the Order of the Coif.

== Legal career ==
=== Early career ===
Following law school, Goldsmith spent one year clerking for United States District Judge Albert W. Coffrin in Burlington, Vermont. He spent a second year in Vermont, as deputy state's attorney in Chittenden County, before moving on to Washington, D.C., to serve as senior staff counsel to the House Select Committee on Assassinations from 1977 to 1979. He spent the following year as Assistant U.S. Attorney in the U.S. Attorney's Office in Philadelphia before turning to the career path for which he is most widely known, that of law professor. Goldsmith taught at Vanderbilt University Law School in Nashville, Tennessee, from 1980 to 1983.

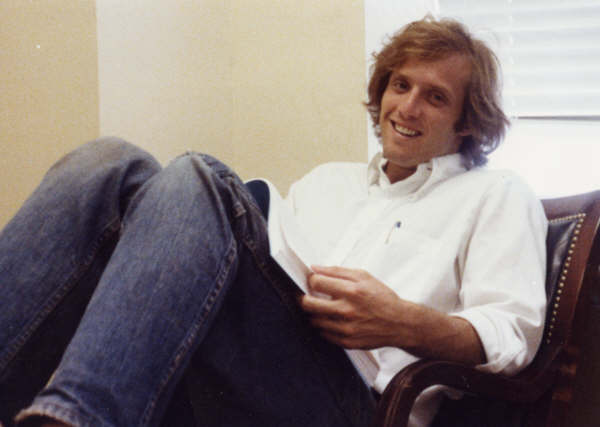
Goldsmith, circa 1978

From 1983 to 1985, Goldsmith served as counsel to the New York State Organized Crime Task Force in White Plains, New York. He directed eavesdropping operations against various mob figures, culminating in his testimony against John Gotti in the late 1980s in a state case charging Gotti with conspiracy to commit murder. Gotti was acquitted because of jury tampering for which his associates were later successfully prosecuted.

Thereafter, Goldsmith returned to teaching, this time as professor of law at Brigham Young University's J. Reuben Clark Law School.

Goldsmith was admitted to the bar in Vermont in 1976, in New York in 1976, and in Utah in 1987.

=== Law professor ===
Building on his prior legal and teaching experience, in 1985 Goldsmith began teaching at the J. Reuben Clark Law School, ultimately terming as Woodruff J. Deem Professor of Law. He taught courses on evidence, criminal procedure, Racketeer Influenced and Corrupt Organizations Act (RICO), trial advocacy, and complex criminal investigations. Devoted to his students, Goldsmith continued to teach even after his diagnosis of amyotrophic lateral sclerosis (ALS).

Goldsmith had been voted "Best Professor of the Year" by the student body six times, in 1985-1986, 1991–1992, 1998–1999, 2005–2006, 2007–2008, and 2008-2009. Given the unusual circumstance of a New York Jew teaching at the Mormon university's law school, rumours circulated for many years that Goldsmith was in the witness protection program, a rumour which his publication record easily puts to rest.

=== U.S. Sentencing Commission ===
In 1994, President Bill Clinton appointed Goldsmith to the U.S. Sentencing Commission. He served on the Commission until 1998, serving as Vice-Chairman from 1995 to 1997.

=== Legal scholarship ===
Goldsmith's Principles of Evidence (1984), originally co-authored with Irving Younger, is one of the most widely used Evidence textbooks in American law schools. Currently in its 7th edition, Principles of Evidence is published by Carolina Academic Press and is now co-authored by Irving Younger, Michael Goldsmith, David Sonenschein, Anthony J. Bocchino, and Jules Epstein.

Additionally, Goldsmith has written extensively on RICO, asset forfeiture, and electronic surveillance:

- Reforming the Civil Rights Act of 1871: The Problem of Police Perjury, 80 NOTRE DAME L. REV. 1259 (2005).
- Reconsidering the Constitutionality of Federal Sentencing Guidelines after Blakely: A Former Commissioner's Perspective, 2004 BYU. L. Rev. 935.
- Resurrecting RICO: Removing Immunity for White-Collar Crime, 41 HARV. J. LEGIS 281 (Winter 2004).
- Proximate Cause in Civil Racketeering Cases: The Misplaced Role of Victim Reliance, 59 Washington & Lee L. REV. 83 (2002) (co-authored with Evan Tilton).
- Corporate Ethics: The Role of Internal Compliance Programmes under the U.S. Sentencing Guidelines (co-authored with Amy Bice-Larson), chapter 5 of UNDERSTANDING HOW ISSUES IN BUSINESS ETHICS DEVELOP 118 (Palgrave MacMillan 2002).
- Lake Wobegon and the U.S. Sentencing Guidelines: The Problem of Disparate Departures, 69 G.W. L. REV. 57 (2000) (co-authored with Marcus Porter).
- The U.S. Sentencing Guidelines: A Surprising Success, OCCASIONAL PAPERS FROM THE CENTER FOR RESEARCH IN CRIME AND JUSTICE (1998), New York University School of Law (co-authored with James Gibson).
- Policing Corporate Crime: The Dilemma of Internal Compliance Programs, 50 VAND. L. REV. 1 (1997) (co-authored with Chad King).
- Judicial Immunity for White-Collar Crime: The Ironic Demise of Civil RICO, 30 HARV. J. LEGIS. 1 (1993).
- The Electronic Surveillance of Privileged Communications: Two Doctrines in Conflict, 64 S. CAL. L. REV. 903 (1991) (co-authored with Kathryn Balmforth).
- Civil RICO Reform: The Gatekeeper Concept, 23 VAND. L. REV. 735 (1990) (co-authored with Mark Linderman).
- Asset Forfeiture and Third Party Rights: The Need for Further Law Reform, 1989 DUKE L. J. 1254 (co-authored with Mark Linderman).
- Civil RICO, Foreign Defendants, and "ET," 73 MINN. L. REV. 1023 (1989) (co-authored with Vicki Rinne).
- RICO and Enterprise Criminality: A Response to Gerard S. Lynch, 88 COLUM. L. REV. 774 (1988).
- RICO and "Pattern:" The Search for Continuity Plus Relationship," 73 CORNELL L. REV. 971 (1988).
- Eavesdropping Reform: The Legality of Roving Surveillance, 1987 U. ILL. L. REV. 401.
- Civil RICO Reform: The Basis for Compromise, 71 MINN. L. REV. 827 (1987).
- Civil RICO Abuse: The Allegations in Context, 1986 BYU L. REV. 55 (co-authored with Penrod Keith).
- The Supreme Court and Title III: Rewriting the Law of Electronic Surveillance, 74 J. CRIM. L. & CRIMINOLOGY 1 (1983).
- Criminal Redistribution of Stolen Property: The Need for Law Reform, 74 MICH. L. REV. 1511 (August 1976) (co-authored with Prof. G. Robert Blakey).
- Property Qualifications for Voting in Special Purpose Districts: Beyond The Scope of "One Man-One Vote," 59 CORNELL L. REV. 687 (1974).

In addition to extensive consulting and lecturing experience, Goldsmith has also written the following articles:

- My Turn: Batting for the Cure: Diagnosed with a Deadly but Uncommon Illness, I Call Upon the Game of My Youth to Take Action, Newsweek, Nov. 1, 2008 (issue dated Nov.10, 2008).
- Embryonic Stem Cell Research: A New Approach to Funding, National Law Journal, Feb. 8, 2007, Op-ed.
- Call a Search a Search, National Law Journal, June 19, 2006, Op-ed, p. 27.
- Preserving the Constitutionality of Federal Sentencing Guidelines, Testimony Before the U.S. Sentencing Commission, November 16, 2004.
- A Former Sentencing Commissioner Looks Forward, FEDERAL SENTENCING REPORTER, Vol. 12, No. 2 (September/October 1999).
- Sentencing Reform That Works, The Washington Post, Nov. 14, 1996, Op-ed page.
- Statement on U.S. Sentencing Policy, contained in The U.S. Sentencing Commission and Cocaine Sentencing Policy, Hearing before the Committee on the Judiciary, United States Senate, 104th Cong., 1st Sess. on Examining U.S. Sentencing Commission Recommendations for Cocaine Sentencing, Serial No. J-104-40 at 26 (1995).
- Establishing a Civil RICO Unit Within the Office of the Attorney General, National Association of Attorneys General (1991 Monograph).
- The Entrapment Defense in Narcotics Cases: Guidelines for Law Enforcement, NARCOTICS CONTROL TECHNICAL ASSISTANCE PROGRAM, BUREAU OF JUSTICE ASSISTANCE (1990 Monograph).
- Plea Bargaining Under the New Federal Sentencing Guidelines, 3 CRIMINAL JUSTICE 3 (Spring 1988) (co-authored with Donald Purdy).
- Undermining Civil RICO, 2 CRIMINAL JUSTICE 6 (Spring 1987) (co-authored with Todd Maynes).
- Statements on RICO Reform, contained in Proposed RICO Reform Legislation, Hearings before the Committee on the Judiciary, United States Senate, 100th Cong., 1st Sess. on S. 1523, at 334 (1987); RICO Reform, Hearings before the Committee on the Judiciary, Subcommittee on Criminal Justice, House of Representatives, 99th Cong., 1st & 2nd Sess., Part 2, Serial 140, at 1261 (1986).
- A Statement for the Reform of Federal Eavesdropping Legislation, contained in 1984: Civil Liberties and the National Security State, Hearings before the Committee on the Judiciary, Subcommittee on Courts, Civil Liberties, and the Administration of Justice, House of Representatives, 98th Cong., 1st & 2nd Sess., Serial 103, at 151, 189 (1984); see also Comments on Proposed Reform, contained in Electronic Communications Privacy Act, 99th Cong., 1st & 2nd Sess., Serials, at 400 (1986).
- On RICO Reform, The New York Times, July 15, 1986, Op-ed page.
- The Legality of Chemical Testing in Professional Sports, The New York Times, February 9, 1986, Section V, p. 2.
- CIVIL RICO: Suing the Profits out of Economic Crime, 12 VANDERBILT LAWYER 8 (Winter 1982).
- The Investigation of the Assassination of President John F. Kennedy, Appendix to Hearings before the Select Committee on Assassinations of the House of Representatives, 95th Cong., 2nd Sess., Volume 6, Photographic Evidence, March, 1979 (co-editor).

=== Private practice ===
A nationally recognized expert in the Racketeer Influenced and Corrupt Organizations Act (RICO), Goldsmith studied under G. Robert Blakey while attending law school at Cornell University. Goldsmith has served as a consultant nationwide on RICO, commercial fraud litigation, electronic surveillance, and criminal defense. More recently, he has handled high-profile civil rights cases.

He was notably a member of the victorious defense team in the bribery case involving the 2002 Salt Lake City Olympics.

=== Awards ===
In addition to Goldsmith's numerous Law Professor of the Year awards, he was also the first annual recipient of the Michael Goldsmith outstanding Trial Lawyer Award, bestowed by the organizers of the Orrin G. Hatch Distinguished Trial Lawyer Lecture Series in November 2008.

== ALS advocacy work ==
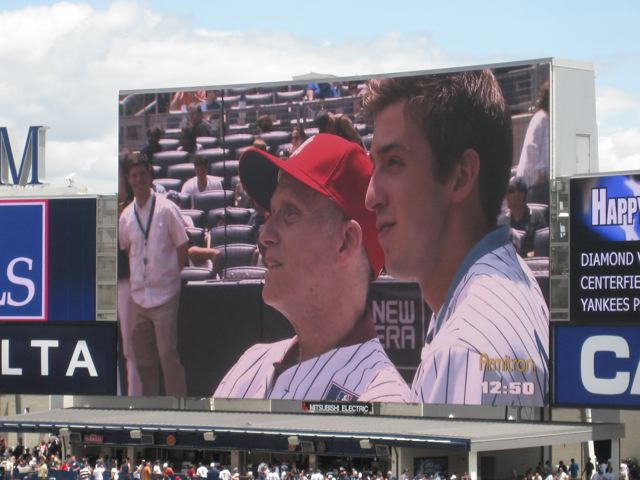
Michael and Austen Goldsmith at MLB 4 ALS Event 7/4/2009

Michael Goldsmith was diagnosed with amyotrophic lateral sclerosis (ALS), also known as Lou Gehrig's disease, in September 2006. With slower than normal neuromuscular decline, Goldsmith determined to become an ALS fundraising advocate.

While attending a Baltimore Orioles fantasy baseball camp, Goldsmith realized that July 4, 2009, would mark the 70th anniversary of Lou Gehrig's farewell speech at Yankee Stadium. In an article in Newsweek entitled "Batting for the Cure", Goldsmith called on Major League Baseball to make July 4, 2009, ALS-Lou Gehrig Day. That article provoked a groundswell and was ultimately read by Bud Selig, the commissioner of baseball, who determined to implement Goldsmith's idea.

On July 4, 2009, every Major League Baseball park in which a game was being played held on-field ceremonies commemorating Lou Gehrig's famous speech and raising awareness and funds in the fight against ALS. In Yankee Stadium, following a half-hour ceremony which included recitation of portions of Lou Gehrig's speech by current Yankee players, Goldsmith himself threw out the ceremonial first pitch. At the event, entitled MLB 4 ALS Awareness, all on-field personnel wore patches with Lou Gehrig's Number 4 on them. Four major non-profit organizations teamed with Major League Baseball in the fight against ALS: The ALS Association, ALS TDI, Augie's Quest (the Muscular Dystrophy Association's ALS research initiative), and Project A.L.S. Lou Gehrig's speech was read during the seventh inning stretch at every Major League Baseball park in which a game was being played on July 4, 2009.

== Personal life ==
Goldsmith had two children, Austen Goldsmith (born 1984) and Jillian Goldsmith (born 1988). Austen graduated from Cornell in 2007 with a BS in Applied Economics and Management and then worked for Sentry Technology in Philadelphia. He worked for Google in New York starting in 2011. He has been working for Amazon since 2017. Jillian graduated from Cornell and Teachers College, Columbia University, and is currently a teacher at the Bronx High School of Science.

Goldsmith resided in Heber City, Utah with his wife Carolyn Goldsmith.

Goldsmith was Jewish.

== Death ==
Michael Goldsmith died in New York State on November 1, 2009. The cause of death was respiratory failure from ALS.

Baseball Commissioner Bud Selig issued a statement following Goldsmith's death. Major League Baseball dedicated Game 5 of the World Series to Michael Goldsmith; a spot aired during the seventh inning encouraging fans to support ALS charities. Notice of his death ran in many newspapers, lauding particularly his skills as a law professor and his ALS advocacy work.
