= Cheryl Preston =

American scholar

Cheryl Bailey Preston
- Education: Brigham Young University (BA, JD)
- Occupation: Law professor
- Employer: Brigham Young University

Cheryl Bailey Preston is contract law scholar and "a nationally recognized expert in Internet regulation and a strong advocate for children in the fight against online pornography." She works with the CP80.org Foundation to fight internet child pornography, and is currently the Edwin M. Thomas endowed chair at the BYU J. Reuben Clark Law School.

== Law studies and career ==
Preston graduated from Brigham Young University (BYU) in 1975 with high honors, majoring in English. She went on to BYU law school, J. Reuben Clark, where she graduated Magna Cum Laude, was awarded the Order of the Coif, and was an articles editor for the flagship journal. Preston is a Latter-day Saint.

After graduating from J. Reuben Clark in 1979, Preston clerked for the Honorable Monroe G. McKay of the Tenth Circuit Federal Court of Appeals, in Utah. From 1981 to '83 she worked for the law firm of O'Melveny & Myers, in Los Angeles. She then returned to Utah where she worked for a law firm until being hired as in-house counsel by First Interstate Bancorp in Salt Lake City, Utah, where she stayed until 1989. In the fall semester of '89, she began teaching at her alma mater, the J. Reuben Clark Law School, and has since become well known for her legal expertise in online contracting and the Infancy doctrine, among other areas of focus relating to contracts.

== Publications ==
Among her articles Legal Osmosis: The Role of Brain Science in Protecting Adolescents with Brandon Crowther, The Spiritual Concept of Form and Function as One': Structure, Doctrine, and The Church of Jesus Christ of Latter-Day Saints, and All Knowledge is Not Equal: Facilitating Children’s Access to Knowledge by Making the Internet Safer. A list of her works can be found at her SSRN author page.
