= A. Scott Loveless =

American academic

A. Scott Loveless is an American academic who was a law professor at the J. Reuben Clark Law School at Brigham Young University (BYU) and served as the Executive Director of the World Family Policy Center, at the BYU Law School, until the Center's closure at the end of 2008.

Loveless has edited, with Thomas Holman, a three volume work entitled The Family in the New Millennium and authored one of the chapters in that set.

Loveless has also been involved in promoting California Proposition 8 (2008), writing multiple pieces in support of this measure.

Loveless received his JD from BYU in 1978, although he spent his last year of Law school at Georgetown University. He also holds a Ph.D. in family studies from BYU which he earned in 2000. Loveless also received his bachelor's degree from BYU.

For 20 years Loveless worked as an attorney and supervising attorney in the Office of the Solicitor of the U.S. Department of the Interior.

Loveless has been closely involved with Richard G. Wilkins in advocating the recognition of the family in international law.

Loveless has also written a review for the Utah Historical Quarterly of a book dealing with natural resource use issues, specifically the "Law of the [Colorado] River."

Loveless is a Latter-day Saint. He is married to Cheri Anderson Loveless who was an Associate Editor of This People and later of Meridian Magazine.

== Sources ==
- Greenwood Press author listing
- "Choosing Our Own Unhappiness" in Meridian Magazine
- BYU faculty bio page
- page listing all J. Reuben Clark law school faculty
- Loveless's Curriculum Vita
- BYU magazine article that mentions Loveless
