= Kif Augustine-Adams =

American academic

- Education: Brigham Young University (BA); Harvard Law School (JD)
- Occupation: Law professor
- Years active: 1979–present

Kif Augustine-Adams (born June 14, 1964) is the Ivan Meitus Chair and professor of law at Brigham Young University (BYU)'s J. Reuben Clark Law School.

Adams has a bachelor's degree from BYU and a J.D. degree from Harvard Law School. Prior to joining the BYU faculty in 1995, she practiced law in Washington, D.C. Her scholarship focuses on the intersection of citizenship, immigration, gender, and race. She has published articles in both English and Spanish.

Adams was the associate dean of research and academic affairs in the J. Reuben Clark Law School from 2008 to 2013. Adams has been a visiting professor at the Boston College Law School and the Peking University School of Transnational Law. She spent six months in Buenos Aires, Argentina, on a Fulbright Fellowship in 2003.

Since 2016, Adams has led the Refugee and Immigration Initiative at BYU. It is a weeklong experience where a group of students travel to Dilley, Texas, to do immigration work at a detention center for those seeking asylum in the U.S.

Adams has published work on immigration and women's issues in early 20th-century Sonora, Mexico.

She plays on the BYU women's faculty flag football team.
