= James D. Gordon III =

American legal academic

James D. Gordon III (born February 9, 1954) is an American legal academic who has also held administrative positions at Brigham Young University (BYU).

As a young man, Gordon served a mission for the Church of Jesus Christ of Latter-day Saints (LDS Church) in Italy.

Gordon earned a bachelor's degree in political science from BYU. He then earned a J.D. degree from the University of California, Berkeley. He was a law clerk for Judge Monroe G. McKay of the 10th United States Circuit court. He then practiced law in Salt Lake City before joining the BYU faculty.

At BYU, Gordon served as Marion B. and Rulon A. Earl Professor of Law. He also was acting dean of the J. Reuben Clark Law School from 2009 to 2010 and served for a time as associate academic vice president for faculty at BYU. In this position, he served as the point man for the university's position in relation to the refusal to grant continuing status to a few professors at BYU in the mid-1990s who publicly criticized the school or its sponsoring institution instead of producing what BYU deemed to be worth-while scholarship in their fields of endeavor. The most drastic case that Gordon had to deal with may have been Gail T. Houston, who advocated prayer practices out-of-line with the teachings of the LDS Church.

In 2010, he was appointed assistant to the president for planning and assessment at BYU, filling the position vacated by Gerrit W. Gong, who become a member of the First Quorum of the Seventy.

Among other positions in the LDS Church, Gordon has served as a bishop and counselor in a stake presidency.

== Sources ==
- BYU News announcement of Gordon's appointment as assistant to the president of BYU for assessment and planning
- Mormon Scholars Testify entry for Gordon
