= Jim Loveless =

American football and basketball (1907–1997)

Biographical details
- Born: March 4, 1907; Francisco, Indiana, U.S.
- Died: September 9, 1997 (aged 90)

Playing career

Football
- 1926–1928: DePauw

Basketball
- 1927–1929: DePauw

Baseball
- c. 1928: DePauw

Coaching career (HC unless noted)

Football
- 1929–1933: Peru HS (IN)
- 1934–1935: Saginaw HS (MI)
- 1936: Southeast Oklahoma State (line)
- 1937–1953: Grove City

Basketball
- 1934–1936: Saginaw HS (MI)
- 1936–1937: Southeast Oklahoma State
- 1946–1954: Grove City

Baseball
- 1937: Southeast Oklahoma State

Administrative career (AD unless noted)
- 1946–1953: Cleveland Browns (scout)
- 1954–1974: DePauw

Head coaching record
- Overall: 39–61–7 (college football); 46–16–2 (high school football)

James C. Loveless (March 4, 1907 – September 9, 1997) was an American football, basketball, baseball, track, and swimming coach, athletics administrator, and educator. He served as the head football coach at Grove City College from 1937 to 1953, compiling a record of 39–61–7. Loveless also coached basketball and track at Grove City.

Loveless attended DePauw University in Greencastle, Indiana, where he starred in football, basketball, and baseball. He died on September 9, 1997.

== Head coaching record ==
=== College football ===
Year	Team	Overall	Conference	Standing	Bowl/playoffs
Grove City Crimson/Wolverines (Independent) (1937–1953)
1937	Grove City	1–7			
1938	Grove City	3–3–2			
1939	Grove City	1–6–1			
1940	Grove City	4–4			
1941	Grove City	3–2–1			
1942	Grove City	2–5			
1943	No team—World War II				
1944	No team—World War II				
1945	No team—World War II				
1946	Grove City	3–4–1			
1947	Grove City	6–2			
1948	Grove City	5–2–1			
1949	Grove City	7–1			
1950	Grove City	1–7			
1951	Grove City	1–6			
1952	Grove City	1–6–1			
1953	Grove City	2–6			
Grove City:		39–61–7			
Total:		39–61–7			
