= Joseph Henry Loveless =

American bootlegger and suspected murderer

- Born: December 3, 1870; Payson, Utah Territory
- Disappeared: May 18, 1916 (aged 45); St. Anthony, Idaho, U.S.A.
- Status: Identified on December 31, 2019; 40 years, 4 months, and 5 days after discovery of torso
- Cause of death: Murder (most likely)
- Body discovered: August 26, 1979 (torso); March 30, 1991 (limbs); Dubois, Idaho
- Other names: Henry Loveless; Charles Smith; Walter Currans; Walter Cairns; Buffalo Cave John Doe
- Known for: Bootlegging, murder suspect, escaped convict, formerly unidentified decedent
- Spouses: Harriet Jane Savage (m. 1899; div. 1904) Agnes Octavia Caldwell Loveless (m. 1905; died 1916)
- Children: 5
- Parents: Joseph Jackson Loveless (father); Sarah Jane Scriggins (mother)
- Criminal charges: Bootlegging, liquor violations, and escaping prison (in 1913 and in 1914) and murder (in 1916)
- Capture status: Deceased
- Escaped: May 18, 1916
- Escape end: When Loveless had died

Details
- Date: The first or second week of May 1916
- Locations: Dubois, Idaho
- Killed: 1 (alleged murder of his wife)
- Weapon: Axe
- Date apprehended: May 1916

Joseph Henry Loveless (December 3, 1870 – c. May 1916), formerly known as Buffalo Cave John Doe, was an American criminal who escaped prison after allegedly murdering his common-law wife, Agnes, with an axe in May 1916. On August 26, 1979, his torso was discovered in a cave in Dubois, Idaho, followed by his limbs on March 26, 1991. However, it was not until late 2019 that the remains were positively identified as his. The positive identification was made possible by forensic genealogists.

== Early life ==
Joseph Henry Loveless was born on December 3, 1870, at Payson, in what was then Utah Territory. His mother, Sarah Jane Scriggins, was from Massachusetts, while his father, Joseph Jackson Loveless, was from Indiana. Both of his parents were early Mormon pioneers from the Latter Day Saint movement.

== Murder of Agnes Loveless ==
On the night of May 5 to 6, 1916, Joseph Henry Loveless allegedly hacked and seriously wounded his wife Agnes with an axe while she was asleep in her bed in their hut in Dubois, Idaho, with two of their children. After attacking his wife with a axe, Joseph Henry Loveless quickly fled the scene. According to reports, shortly after Joseph Henry Loveless fled the scene, their seven-year-old son Edison Loveless discovered Agnes Loveless's seriously wounded body covered in blood and ran to neighbors crying for help. When the authorities came to the scene and searched the area, Joseph Henry Loveless was nowhere to be found. As a result of her severe wounds, Agnes Loveless died two days later, on the morning of May 8, at around 7:00 A.M. Reports from the time identify her murderer as "Charles Smith", whom some additionally named as her husband, while their neighbours had testified that Joseph Henry Loveless and his common-law wife, Agnes, had been fighting earlier in the evening of May 5, several hours before he attacked and seriously wounded her with a axe, after she returned from a dance in the city. Charles Smith was one of Loveless's many aliases. At Agnes Loveless's funeral the next day on May 9, one of their sons was quoted as saying, "Papa never stayed in jail for very long and (when he will be caught) he will soon be out". On May 11, 1916, Joseph Henry Loveless was found and captured by the police and was arrested for the brutal murder of his wife, and was subsequently sent to jail in St. Anthony.

=== Prison escape ===
Seven days after his capture and arrest, on the evening hours of May 18, 1916, Joseph Henry Loveless had broken out of his prison cell in St. Anthony and escaped, by sawing through the prison cell bars, using a saw that he secretly hid in one of his shoes, while his personal prison cell guard was out eating his supper. There is some speculation that Joseph Henry Loveless was assisted in his escape by a person or person(s), from outside of his prison cell.

After his final escape from prison, the authorities and search volunteers launched a manhunt search for Joseph Henry Loveless for several weeks in northeastern Idaho and set up wanted posters throughout the area, but they were unable to find and capture him, despite their extensive searches for him.

== Death ==
The details of Loveless's death are unknown, and it is an open case with the Clark County Sheriff's Office as of January 2020. However, his final wanted poster after his jailbreak describes him as wearing some of the same clothes that were found with his remains: a light-colored hat, brown coat, red maroon sweater, and blue overalls over black trousers. The clothing found with the remains, included: Only a red maroon sweater, black trousers and a white-pinstriped collar shirt, which was not listed with the clothing on the wanted poster. This caused Lee Bingham Redgrave, a forensic genealogist with the DNA Doe Project, to speculate that Loveless died in 1916. The cause of death is unknown, though multiple sharp tools were used to dismember his body. Samantha Blatt, bioarchaeologist at Idaho State University, speculated that Loveless may have been killed by his deceased wife's family as revenge for her murder.

== Discovery ==
In 1979, a family searching for arrowheads in Buffalo Cave near Dubois, Idaho, discovered human remains in a burlap sack, consisting of a headless torso. In 1991, a girl found a hand in the same cave, prompting excavations which recovered both legs and an arm. Forensic researchers estimated that the man was of European descent, and around 40 years old at the time of death. Identification was thought nearly impossible due to the missing head. His post-mortem interval was initially estimated to be between six months and five years.

== Identification ==
In 2019, Idaho State University anthropologists, Samantha Blatt and Amy Michael, along with Clark County authorities solicited help from the DNA Doe Project, a nonprofit that seeks to identify previously unidentified deceased persons via forensic genealogy. Researchers constructed a genealogical tree for the unidentified remains. Because one of Loveless's grandfathers was a polygamist with four wives, the tree was large, with hundreds of cousins and other relatives. Loveless was considered a plausible candidate, though, as his gravestone was found to be a cenotaph (not accompanied by his remains). Loveless's 87-year-old grandson was identified as living in California, and he agreed to take a DNA test, which confirmed that the remains were those of his grandfather Joseph Henry Loveless.

== See also ==
- List of unsolved murders (1900–1979)
