= Campus of Brigham Young University =

Coordinates: 40°15′2.3″N 111°38′57.36″W

The main campus of Brigham Young University sits on approximately 560 acres (2.3 km^{2}) nestled at the base of the Wasatch Mountains and includes 311 buildings. The buildings feature a wide variety of architectural styles, each building being built in the style of its time. The grounds and landscaping of the campus won first place in 2005 in America in Bloom's campus division. Furthermore, views of the Wasatch Mountains (including Mount Timpanogos) can be seen from the campus. BYU's Harold B. Lee Library, which The Princeton Review ranked as the #1 "Great College Library" in 2004, has approximately 8½ million items in its collections, contains 98 miles (158 km) of shelving, and can seat 4,600 people. The Spencer W. Kimball Tower is home to several of the university's departments and programs and is the tallest building in Provo, Utah. Furthermore, BYU's Marriott Center, used as a basketball arena, can seat almost 18,000 and is one of the largest on-campus arenas in the nation.

== Museums ==
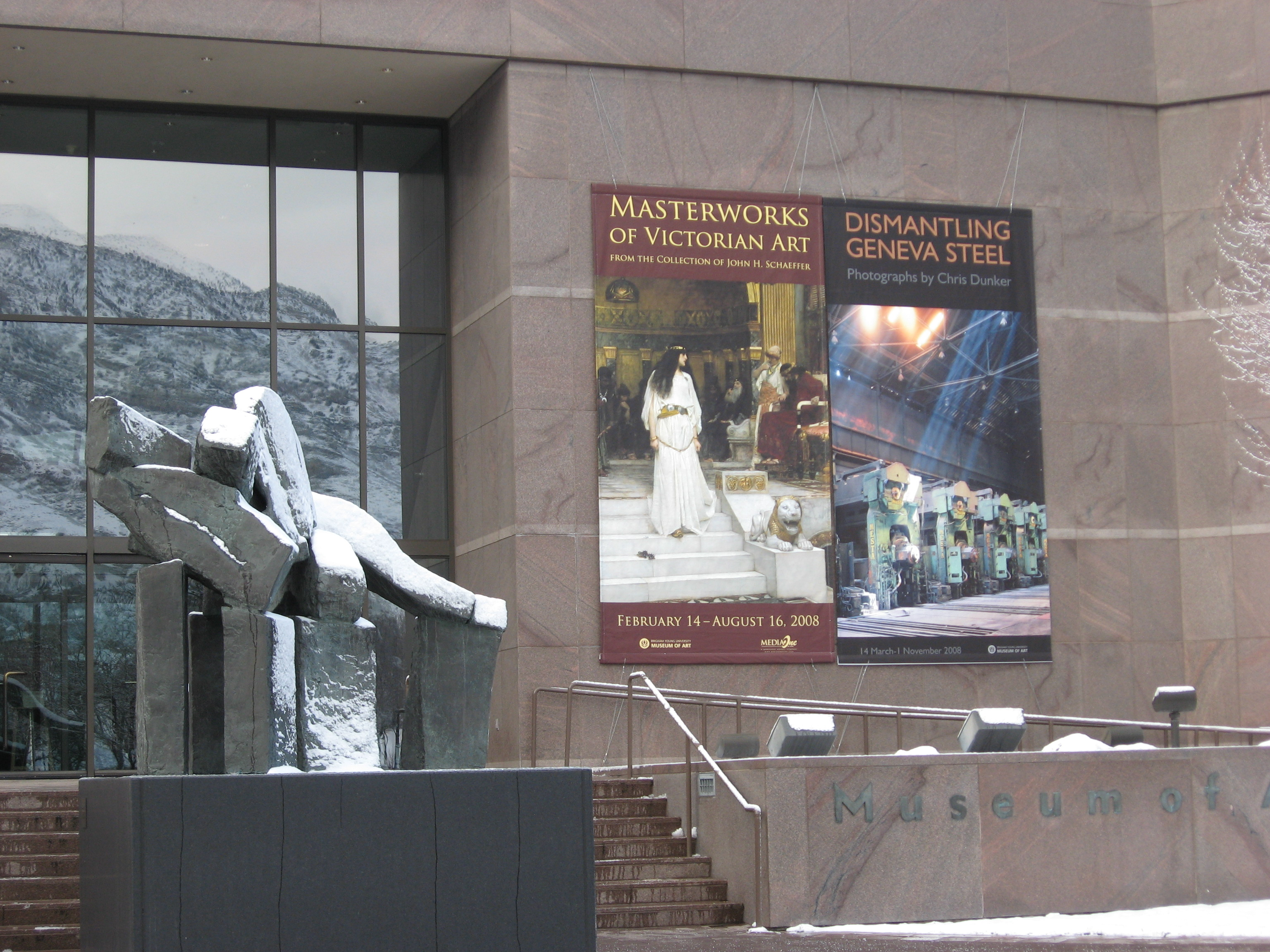
Museum of Art north entrance

The campus is home to several museums containing exhibits from many different fields of study.

BYU's Museum of Art, for example, is one of the largest and most attended art museums in the Mountain West. This Museum aids in academic pursuits of students at BYU via research and study of the artworks in its collection. The Museum is also open to the general public and provides educational programming.

The Museum of Peoples and Cultures is a museum of archaeology and ethnology. It focuses on native cultures and artifacts of the Great Basin, American Southwest, Mesoamerica, Peru, and Polynesia. Home to more than 40,000 artifacts and 50,000 photographs, it documents BYU's archaeological research.

The Museum of Paleontology was built in 1976 to display the many fossils found by BYU's Dr. James A. Jensen. It holds many artifacts from the Jurassic Period (210-140 million years ago), and is one of the top five collections in the world of fossils from that time period. It has been featured in magazines, newspapers, and on television internationally. The museum receives about 25,000 visitors every year.

The Monte L. Bean Life Science Museum was formed in 1978. It features several forms of plant and animal life on display and available for research by students and scholars.

== Student housing ==
Single students have four options for on-campus housing: Heritage Halls, Helaman Halls, Wyview Park, and the FLSR. Married students can live in Wymount Terrace.

Heritage Halls is a twenty-four building housing complex on campus which offers apartment-style living. The halls house both male and female students, divided by gender into separate buildings. Each building has ten to fourteen units capable of housing six people each.

Helaman Halls is a slightly newer complex which has recently undergone a 12-year renovation spanning 1991 and through 2004. Helaman Halls is a six building, dormitory style living area. Residents share a room (larger than Heritage Halls) with one other resident, but do not have their own kitchen and use shared bathrooms. Residents are required to have a meal plan, and eat at the newly remodeled Commons at the Cannon Center.

Wyview Park was originally built for families in 1996, but this changed in 2006 when the complex began housing single students in order to counteract loss of singles' housing in other areas. Wyview Park has 30 buildings that offer apartment-style living for students, along with the option for shared or single rooms.

The Foreign Language Student Residence complex has twenty-five apartments where students speak exclusively in a selected foreign language. The immersion experience is available in nine languages, and students are accompanied by a native resident throughout the year to enhance the experience.

Married students can house in Wymount Terrace, which contains a total of 898 apartments in 72 buildings.

Branches of the BYU Creamery provide basic food and general grocery products for students living in Heritage Halls, Wymount, Wyview, and the FLSR. Helaman Halls is served by a central cafeteria called the Cannon Center. The creamery, begun in 1949, has become a BYU tradition and is also frequented by visitors to the university and members of the community. It was the first on-campus full-service grocery store in the country.

== BYU Salt Lake Center ==
BYU also has an extension campus, the BYU Salt Lake Center in Salt Lake City, which began in 1959. On 20 August 2007, the Salt Lake Center moved to a new Campus located on Salt Lake's North Temple street. The campus now occupies three floors of the Triad Center, and has a total of 28 classrooms. Admitted BYU students may register for classes by means of the standard BYU-Provo admissions process. Non-admitted students may also register for classes with proper clearance. However, while these credits can be applied at BYU or transferred to other universities, registration does not constitute admittance to BYU. The center has undergone a move, previous to which, most classes were held in the evening, and the curriculum was limited in size. Class offerings and times have since expanded.

On September 15, 2012, BYU Salt Lake Center held their first tailgate party for the BYU vs. Utah rivalry game. Over three hundred people watched the game on an 18-foot blow up screen and ate hotdogs, BYU brownies, and washed them down with free soda provided by BYU Salt Lake. LDS Business College provided hotdogs and chips to the first 200 people. Other sponsors included BYU Athletics, Deseret First Credit Union and the BYU Tailgating Club.
