= Henry Allen Loveless =

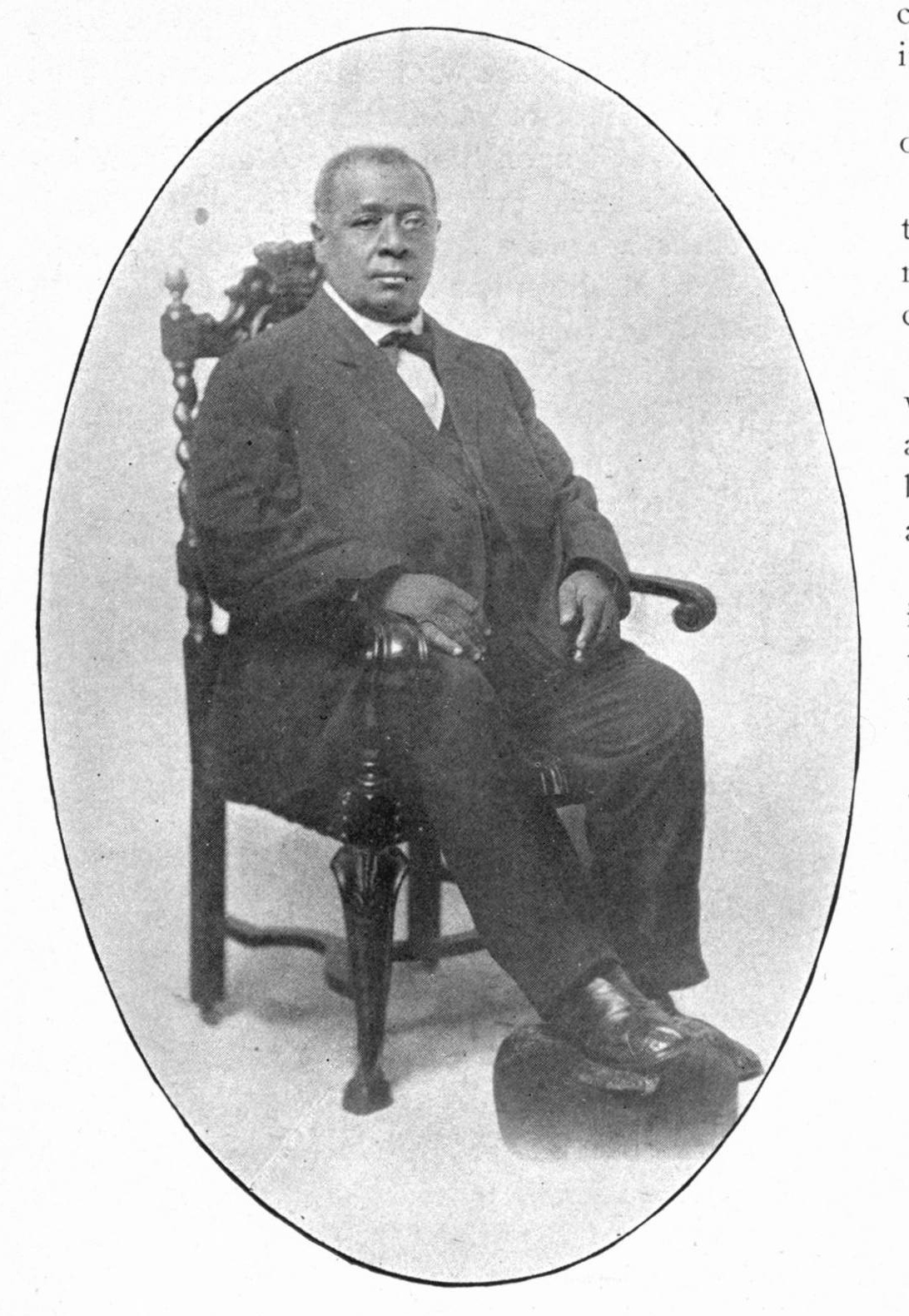

Henry Allen Loveless (1854–1921) was a businessman and community leader in Montgomery, Alabama. He helped found the Dexter Avenue Baptist Church.

== Biography ==
Henry Allen Loveless was born in Bullock County, Alabama, in 1854, near Union Springs. He did not attend school until he was 18, when he enrolled in night school. After he was first married he spent two terms at Selma University. His first commercial enterprise was as a butcher, and then he started a business as an undertaker, becoming very successful. An early member of the Dexter Avenue Baptist Church, he was on the board of trustees and was the church's treasurer. He was married three times.

Booker T. Washington profiled him in the book The Negro in Business.

He died in Montgomery on August 8, 1921.

== Legacy ==
A school for African American students, established in Montgomery in 1923, was named for him. His name is retained in LAMP High School, which was housed for a while in the former Loveless school.
