= Mathias Siems =

Professor of comparative law, textbook author

Mathias Siems is a legal scholar specializing on comparative law and private law. Since January 2019, he holds the chair of Private Law and Market Regulation at the European University Institute.

== Career and education ==
Siems studied law at LMU Munich and the University of Edinburgh.

After completing his doctoral studies, he held academic positions at the Riga Graduate School of Law, the University of Edinburgh, the University of East Anglia, and Durham University.

== Academic contributions ==
As of the end of 2024, Mathias Siems's scholarly work has received over 5800 citations, and his work at Durham University has been submitted as an impact case study for the 2021 Research Excellence Framework.

Within the field of private law, Siems has published extensively on matters of European and comparative corporate law. Siems was one of the authors of a report on the law applicable to companies in the European Union, which the European Commission has cited to justify the introduction of a policy package on company law. His 2007 book Convergence in Shareholder Law provides an extensive empirical study of the laws on shareholder rights in the United States, United Kingdom, Germany, France, Japan, and China, which received positive reviews in leading scholarly journals. Together with David Cabrelli, Siems edited the book Comparative Company Law: A Case-Based Approach, which has been describer by scholars as offering a comprehensive introduction to company law in various countries. His work has also been credited as leading the World Bank to adjust the index used in its Doing Business report.

Mathias Siems is also known for his work on the methods of comparative law. His textbook on comparative law, now in its third edition, has been described as part of a "rebirth of [comparative law] as a genuinely scholarly field of research." More recently, Siems and Po Jen Yap edited the Cambridge handbook of comparative law, credited with an expansion of the geographical and methodological coverage of comparative legal research.

Siems is also a member of the editorial board of scholarly journals, such as the American Journal of Comparative Law, the European Journal of Empirical Legal Studies and Law and Social Inquiry.

== Selected publications ==
- M Siems and PJ Yap (eds), Cambridge handbook of comparative law. Cambridge: Cambridge University Press, 2024.
- M Siems, Comparative Law. Cambridge: Cambridge University Press (Law in Context Series), 1st edition, 2014, 416 + xx pages; 2nd edition, 2018, 506 + xxiii pages; 3rd edition, 2022, 570 + xx pages. Reviewed at the Maastricht Journal of European and Comparative Law, the Journal of Comparative Law, the Edinburgh Law Review, and the American Journal of Comparative Law.
- M Siems and David Cabrelli (eds), Comparative Company Law: A Case-Based Approach. Cambridge University Press, 2013.
- M Siems, Convergence in Shareholder Law. Cambridge: Cambridge University Press, 2007.
- S Deakin, P Lele, M Siems. "The evolution of labour law: Calibrating and comparing regulatory regimes" (2007) International Labour Review 146 (3‐4), 133-162.
- M Siems, "Malicious legal transplants" (2018) Legal Studies 38 (1), 103-119.
- J Armour, S Deakin, P Sarkar, M Siems, A Singh. "Shareholder protection and stock market development: an empirical test of the legal origins hypothesis" (2009) Journal of Empirical Legal Studies 6(2), 343-380.
- MM Siems, "Legal originality" in M Del Mar, W Twining, M Giudice (eds.), Legal Theory and the Legal Academy. London: Routledge, 2017, 225-242.
