= Larry Ribstein =

Larry E. Ribstein (1946 – December 24, 2011) was an American law professor who made significant contributions to corporate law.

Ribstein earned his B.A. from Johns Hopkins University and his J.D. from the University of Chicago Law School. He practiced for three years as an associate at McDermott, Will & Emery in Chicago.

He began his teaching career at Mercer University Law School (1975–87), later serving on the faculty at George Mason University School of Law (1987–2002), including as George Mason University Foundation Professor of Law (1993–2002). He also held visiting professorships at New York University School of Law, University of Texas School of Law, Washington University School of Law, and Saint Louis University School of Law. He joined the faculty of the University of Illinois College of Law in 2002 and became the Mildred Van Voorhis Jones Chair, Associate Dean for Research, and Co-Director of the Illinois Business Law and Policy Program.

His interests included partnerships and limited liability companies, corporate and securities law, choice of law, financial regulation, white-collar crime, legal ethics, and the legal profession. His publications include:

- The Rise of the Uncorporation (Oxford University Press, 2010)
- The Law Market (Oxford University Press, 2009) (with Erin A. O’Hara)
- The Sarbanes-Oxley Debacle (American Enterprise Institute Press, 2006) (with Henry N. Butler)
- The Constitution and the Corporation (American Enterprise Institute Press, 1995) (with Butler)
- Ribstein & Keatinge on Limited Liability Corporations
- Bromberg & Ribstein on Partnerships
- Business Associations (4th ed. 2003, Lexis/Nexis) (with Peter V. Letsou)
- Unincorporated Business Entities (4th ed. 2009, Lexis/Nexis) (with Jeffrey M. Lipshaw)

He served the legal-academic community in a variety of capacities, including on the Executive Committee of the American Association of Law Schools (AALS) Section on Securities Regulation, as chair of the AALS Section on Agency, Partnership and LLCs, and as editor and co-editor of The Supreme Court Economic Review.

Ribstein was the founder of Ideoblog (www.ideoblog.org) and the leading contributor to the Truth on the Market blog (www.truthonthemarket.com).
