= J. Reuben Clark Law School =

Law school at Brigham Young University, Provo, Utah

- Parent school: Brigham Young University
- Religious affiliation: The Church of Jesus Christ of Latter-day Saints
- Established: 1973; 53 years ago
- School type: Private
- Dean: David H. Moore
- Location: Provo, Utah, USA; 40.2494°N 111.6453°W
- Enrollment: 348 (2026)
- Faculty: 40 (full-time), 57 (part-time)
- USNWR ranking: 24th (tie) (2026)
- Bar pass rate: 96.85% (2025)
- Website: law.byu.edu
- ABA profile: ABA Profile

The J. Reuben Clark Law School (BYU Law or JRCLS) is the law school of Brigham Young University (BYU) in Provo, Utah. Founded in 1973, under the oversight of Dallin H. Oaks, the school is named after J. Reuben Clark, a former attorney, officer in the U.S. Army JAG Corps, U.S. Ambassador, Undersecretary of State, and general authority of the institution's sponsoring organization, the Church of Jesus Christ of Latter-day Saints (LDS Church).

BYU Law is fully accredited by the American Bar Association (ABA), and a member of the Association of American Law Schools.

== History ==
On March 9, 1971, the BYU Board of Trustees announced that a law school would be established at the university. Just two-and-one-half years later the opening ceremonies were held on August 27, 1973. Classes were initially held several blocks south in an old Catholic school building (St. Francis of Assisi, 300 N. 900 East), affectionately referred to as "St. Reuben's" by the students.

The law school's inaugural dean was American lawyer Rex Lee, who later served as U.S. Solicitor General during the administration of President Ronald Reagan. The JRCLS Building was completed and dedicated in 1975, and the law school graduated its first class in 1976. The law school has since graduated more than 5,000 students.

== Campus ==
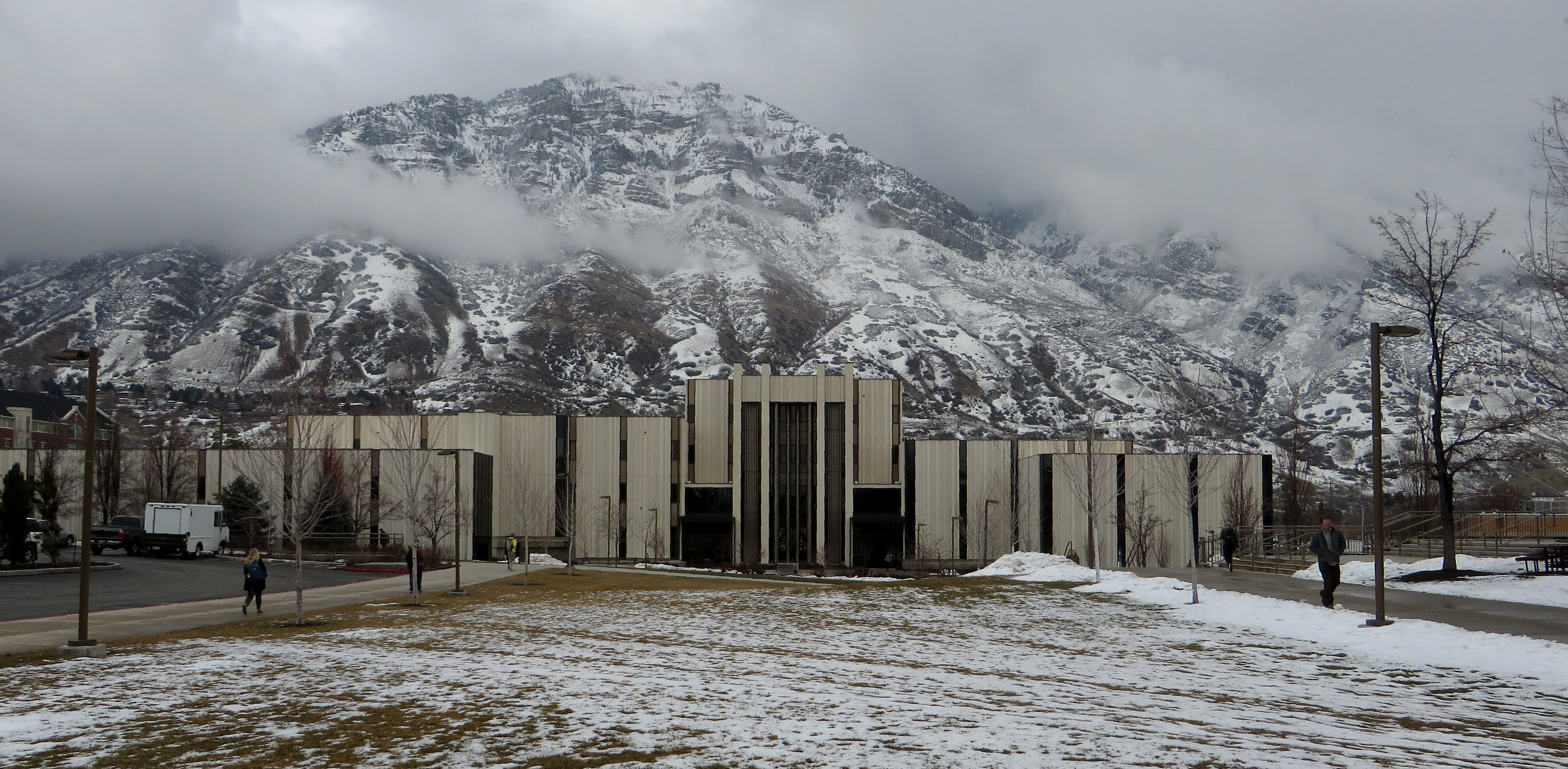
J. Reuben Clark Law School

The nearly 100,000-square-foot (9,300 m^{2}) BYU Law building is located on the east side of the BYU campus and backdropped by Y Mountain. The building's five floors contain eleven classrooms, three seminar rooms, a student commons area, a student lunchroom, spaces for student organizations and activities, a large computer lab, and a computer training room.

The Howard W. Hunter Law Library occupies the north wing of the law building and houses a collection of over 450,000 volumes and volume equivalents in paper and microform. The library provides students with 470 individually assigned study carrels, 17 group study rooms, a reading room for quiet study, and a popular reading and conversation room. The library also has two classrooms where library faculty teach legal research and writing classes, familiarizing students with specific types of legal research and with library holdings. In 2014, the National Jurist ranked the Howard W. Hunter Law Library as the 25th best law library in the country.

The campus is located within the original jurisdiction of the United States District Court for the District of Utah and the appellate jurisdiction of the United States Court of Appeals for the Tenth Circuit (except for patent claims and claims against the U.S. government under the Tucker Act, which are appealed to the United States Court of Appeals for the Federal Circuit).

== Academics ==
=== Admissions ===
Many admitted students have graduate and/or doctoral degrees in a wide range of academic disciplines, and most have spent time abroad. Entering students graduated from over 70 different undergraduate colleges and universities in 11 countries and nearly 40 US states.

In 2009, the incoming class had a median GPA of 3.73 and a median LSAT score of 165. Based on these numbers, BYU Law ranks 19th in the nation for GPA and 25th in the nation for LSAT admissions standards.

Admission to the BYU Law School is open to people of any faith or sexual orientation, subject to the school's Honor Code. Among other things, the Honor Code precludes the admission and retention of students who are former members of the LDS Church, or whose actions are categorized as "homosexual behavior", which includes both sexual relations and "all forms of physical intimacy that give expression to homosexual feelings". To verify Honor Code compliance, students are required to obtain, and maintain during their course of study, an ecclesiastical endorsement from a religious leader or designated BYU chaplain. In 2016, the ABA, which accredits the school, conducted a review to determine whether BYU Law School's admission and retention policy was in accordance with its nondiscrimination policy. The ABA ended the review later in 2016 after BYU modified the Honor Code to make it easier for students to obtain an exemption to the ecclesiastical endorsement requirement.

=== Degree programs ===
==== Juris Doctor (JD) program ====
Most of the students at BYU Law are enrolled in the Juris Doctor (JD) program. JD students are required to take 90 semester hours of credit in order to graduate. In the first year of law school all students are required to take one semester each of Civil Procedure, Contracts, Criminal Law, Property, Torts, Introduction to Legal Research and Writing, Introduction to Advocacy, Legislation and Regulation, and Structures of the Constitution. Additionally, each student must take Professional Responsibility during their second or third year and prepare a substantial paper (at least 30 pgs). Students must also fulfill a Professional Skills Requirement by completing six hours of externship credit or Professional Skills Courses. In addition to their substantive coursework, many second and third-year students participate in moot court, a scholarly publication, a clinic, or an externship.

==== Joint Degree programs ====
For students interested in a more general interdisciplinary course of study, BYU Law offers five joint degree programs (usually completed in four years, as opposed to three for a standard JD):

JD-MAcc, with the School of Accountancy within the Marriott School of Business
JD-MBA, with the Marriott School of Business
JD-MEd, with the David O. McKay School of Education
JD-MPA, with the Romney Institute of Public Service and Ethics within the Marriott School of Business

==== Master of Laws (LLM) program ====
For foreign lawyers seeking a master's degree in Comparative American law, BYU Law offers a two-semester Master of Laws (LLM) program. Applicants must have a law degree or certification from an institution located outside the U.S. to participate in the program.

=== Academic offerings ===
The student-to-faculty ratio at BYU Law is about 18 to one. The current faculty includes numerous former U.S. Supreme Court and U.S. Circuit Court judicial law clerks. The school hosts several events each year, including the World Family Policy Center / United Nations Conference (July), the International Law and Religion Symposium (October), and the Orrin G. Hatch Distinguished Trial Lawyer Lecture Series (November).

Students at BYU Law publish four law journals: the BYU Law Review, the BYU Journal of Public Law, the BYU Education and Law Journal, and the BYU International Law & Management Review.

BYU Law's Religious Liberty Clinic offers a hands-on program for law students who want to defend all faiths.

== Rankings ==
The U.S. News & World Report's "Best Law Schools" ranked BYU Law tied for 24th in the country overall (2026). The school's median LSAT score was among the highest in the nation at 170 out of 180 (2026).

The National Jurist has repeatedly named BYU Law 1st or 2nd in "Best Value Law Schools" (2026, 2022, 2021, 2016). In 2020, The National Jurist reported data from the U.S. Department of Education reflecting that BYU Law had the lowest median federal student debt ($51,250) of any law school in the country.

Leiter's Law School Rankings:

- 13th per capita rate in United States Supreme Court clerk placement (2003–2013)
- 25th in Admissions Selectivity (2018)
- 33rd in Student Quality (2018)
- 49th in Scholarly Impact (2018)

== Employment ==
According to BYU's official 2013 ABA-required disclosures, within nine months of graduation 64.6% of the Class of 2013 found full-time, long-term, bar-passage-requirement employment; 11.5% found full-time, long-term, JD-advantage employment; and 5.4% found part-time, long-term, bar-passage-required or JD-advantage employment. Overall, 92% of the Class of 2013 found employment within nine months of graduation, and 83.7% of those who found employment were in full-time, long-term positions. BYU's Law School Transparency under-employment score is 20.4%, indicating the percentage of the Class of 2013 unemployed, pursuing an additional degree, or working in a non-professional, short-term, or part-time job nine months after graduation.

== Associated organizations ==
BYU Law students may participate in a wide variety of organizations while attending law school and after graduation. Co-curricular programs include Law Review, Moot Court, Trial Advocacy, and various other student-edited publications. For extracurricular activities, students may choose from more than 30 student-run and professional associations, including the American Constitution Society, the Federalist Society, the Student Bar Association, and the Minority Law Students Association.

Of particular note is the J. Reuben Clark Law Society, which is an organization of law school students and graduates consisting of 65 professional and 125 student chapters throughout the world. Although students and graduates of BYU Law are de facto members of the society, there is no requirement to attend the law school or to be a member of the LDS Church. The organization claims the following current or former government officials: 14 U.S. circuit court of appeals judges, 18 U.S. district court judges, 4 U.S. attorneys, 6 U.S. senators, 9 U.S. congressmen, dozens of legal officers in Fortune 500 companies, and over 100 state supreme court, appellate court, and district court judges.

The society holds an annual conference for students and practicing attorneys. Prior conferences have featured former U.S. Supreme Court Justice Sandra Day O'Connor and current U.S. Supreme Court Justice Clarence Thomas.

Students of the law school were among the members of the first chapter of the American Inns of Court, organized in 1980.

== Notable people ==
=== Faculty ===
Faculty include Kif Augustine-Adams, Cole Durham, Frederick Gedicks, Cheryl Preston, Brett Scharffs and Lynn Wardle.

Notable former faculty include Hon. Dee Benson, Larry Echohawk, Michael Goldsmith, James D. Gordon III, Hon. Thomas B. Griffith, RonNell Andersen Jones, Hon. Dale A. Kimball, Hon. Mike Lee, Hon. Thomas R. Lee, A. Scott Loveless, Aaron Nielson and Hon. Howard C. Nielson Jr..

==== Deans ====
The following people have served as dean of the J. Reuben Clark Law School: Rex E. Lee, Carl S. Hawkins (1981–1985), Bruce C. Hafen (1985–1989), H. Reese Hansen (1990–2004), Kevin J Worthen (2004–2008), James Rasband (2009–2016), D. Gordon Smith (2016–2023), and David H. Moore (2023–present).

=== Alumni ===
Notable BYU Law alumni include three U.S. circuit judges, five U.S. district judges, one U.S. senator, three U.S. congressmen, three university presidents, numerous law professors, and an NFL Hall-of-Famer.

=== Alumni law clerks of the United States Supreme Court ===
For the 2003–2013 Terms of the United States Supreme Court, BYU Law was ranked #13 nationally in Brian Leiter's rankings for Supreme Court clerkship placement (per capita).

Seat	Num	Justice	Law clerk	Started	Finished	Graduation year	Previous clerkship
CJ	97	Warren E. Burger	Monte N. Stewart	1977	1978	1976	J. C. Wallace (9th Cir.)
CJ/9	97/103	Warren E. Burger (shared with Antonin Scalia)	Von G. Keetch	1989	1990	1987	G. Pratt (2d Cir.)
CJ/10	97/106	Warren E. Burger (shared with Clarence Thomas)	Karl M. Tilleman	1992	1993	1990	J. Noonan (9th Cir.)
CJ	100	William Rehnquist	Stephen M. Sargent	1994	1995	1993	Tacha (10th Cir.)
CJ	100	William Rehnquist	Hon. Jay Jorgensen	1999	2000	1997	Alito (3d Cir.)
1	99	Lewis F. Powell, Jr.	Prof. Eric G. Andersen	1978	1979	1977	J. C. Wallace (9th Cir.)
1	99	Lewis F. Powell, Jr.	Hon. Michael W. Mosman	1985	1986	1984	Wilkey (D.C. Cir.)
6	93	Byron White	Pres. Kevin J Worthen	1983	1984	1982	Wilkey (D.C. Cir.)
8	102	Sandra Day O'Connor	Hon. Denise Posse-Blanco Lindberg	1990	1991	1988	McKay (10th Cir.)
8	110	Samuel Alito	Hannah Clayson Smith	February 2006	July 2006	2001	C. Thomas / Alito (3d Cir.)
8	110	Samuel Alito	Sen. Michael S. Lee	2006	2007	1997	Alito (3d Cir.) / Benson (D. Utah)
8	110	Samuel Alito	Dean David H. Moore	2007	2008	1996	Alito (3d Cir.)
10	106	Clarence Thomas	Hannah Clayson Smith	2003	2004	2001	Alito (3d Cir.)
10	106	Clarence Thomas	Robert Stander	2014	2015	2011	Sutton (6th Cir.) / Lee (Utah)
9	113	Neil Gorsuch	Prof. Stephanie Barclay	2021	2022	2011	Smith (9th Cir.)
8	110	Samuel Alito	James R. Lee	2023	2024	2021	Thapar (6th Cir.) / Nielson (D. Utah)

== See also ==
- List of law schools in the United States
