= Norman L. Nielsen =

American politician (born 1935)

Norman LeRoy Nielsen (born May 4, 1935) is a former American politician. He was a Republican member of the Utah House of Representatives, serving from 1991 to 1997. He was also the head of the Scera Center for the Arts in Orem, Utah for several years beginning in the later 1970s. He revitalized the Scera and made it a major artistic venue in Orem.

Nielsen was born in Salt Lake City to Roy N. and Glenda Bronson Nielsen. He graduated with a B.S. degree from Brigham Young University, and married Roseanne Tueller in 1965.

== Sources ==
- BYU Magazine Spring 2009
