= J. Reuben Clark Law Society =

- Abbreviation: JRCLS
- Named after: J. Reuben Clark
- Type: Voluntary association
- Legal status: Association
- Purpose: Religious conviction, Public service, Professionalism
- Headquarters: Provo, Utah, United States
- Region served: Worldwide
- Members: attorneys, lawyers, law school graduates or law school students who support the mission of the Society
- Chair of the Society: Jeremiah Morgan
- Affiliations: J. Reuben Clark Law School, Brigham Young University
- Website: jrcls.org

The J. Reuben Clark Law Society is an organization of lawyers and law school students consisting of over 65 professional and 125 student chapters throughout the world. Named in honor of J. Reuben Clark, a former United States Ambassador to Mexico and Under Secretary of State, the society's membership is primarily composed of members of the Church of Jesus Christ of Latter-day Saints (LDS Church), although there is no requirement that those in the society be church members. Alumni and students of the J. Reuben Clark Law School at Brigham Young University (BYU) are de facto members of the society.

The organization currently claims as members 14 circuit court of appeals judges, 18 U.S. district court judges, four United States Attorneys, six U.S. Senators, including erstwhile President Pro Tempore Orrin Hatch, nine U.S. Representatives, 17 Fortune 500 corporate counselors, more than 85 state judges (including of state supreme courts), and thousands of practicing attorneys and law students.

The society holds an annual conference for students and attorneys, typically in the middle of February. The 2006 conference was held in Washington, D.C., and featured the Attorney General of the United States as well as a panel of distinguished U.S. Supreme Court advocates. The 2009 conference was held at Harvard Law School. The 2012 conference was held at Stanford Law School. The 2013 conference was held in Washington, DC.

== Notable members ==
- Henry J. Eyring – Former president of Brigham Young University-Idaho
- E. Gordon Gee – President of West Virginia University
- Lloyd D. George – U.S. District Judge and Namesake of the Lloyd D. George Federal Courthouse
- Orrin Hatch – Former President Pro Tempore of the U.S. Senate
- Mike Lee – U.S. Senator
- Harry Reid – Former U.S. Senate Minority Leader
- Hannah Clayson Smith – Senior Counsel for the Becket Fund for Religious Liberty
- Kevin J Worthen – Former president of BYU
- Michael K. Young – President of Texas A&M University
