= BYU Law Review =

- Discipline: Jurisprudence
- Language: English
- Edited by: Scott Maughn

Publication details
- History: 1975-present
- Publisher: J. Reuben Clark Law School, Brigham Young University (United States)
- Frequency: Bimonthly

Standard abbreviations
- Bluebook: BYU L. Rev.
- ISO 4: BYU Law Rev.

Indexing
- ISSN: 0360-151X

Links
- Journal homepage

The Brigham Young University Law Review is a law journal edited by students at Brigham Young University's J. Reuben Clark Law School. The journal publishes six issues per annual volume, with each issue generally including several professional articles and a number of student notes and comments.

== Annual symposia ==
The Brigham Young University Law Review typically publishes the proceedings of the annual International Law & Religion Symposium, sponsored by the BYU International Center for Law & Religious Studies, in the second issue of each volume. It also hosts and publishes the concomitant work of an annual faculty-organized symposium on a salient legal topic.

== Notable articles ==
- Floyd, C. Douglas. "The ALI, Supplemental Jurisdiction, and the Federal Constitutional Case" (PDF). BYU Law Review. 1995 (3): 877–414.
- Olson, Theodore B. "The Advocate as Friend: The Solicitor General's Stewardship Through the Example of Rex E. Lee" (PDF). BYU Law Review. 2003 (1): 3–36.
- Peters, Wm. C. "On Law, Wars, and Mercenaries: The Case for Courts-Martial Jurisdiction over Civilian Contractor Misconduct in Iraq" (PDF). BYU Law Review. 2006 (1): 367–414.
- Elizabeth, Cosenza. "The Holy Grail of Corporate Governance Reform: Independence or Democracy?" (PDF). BYU Law Review. 2007 (1): 1–51.
