= Deaths in February 2016 =

The following is a list of notable deaths in February 2016.

Entries for each day are listed alphabetically by surname. A typical entry lists information in the following sequence:

- Name, age, country of citizenship and reason for notability, established cause of death, reference.

== February 2016 ==
=== 1 ===
- Wasil Ahmad, 11, Afghan child soldier, shot.
- Israr Ali, 88, Pakistani Test cricketer.
- Ali Beratlıgil, 84, Turkish football player and coach.
- Francis Buckley, 94, Canadian business executive (Buckley's).
- Jon Bunch, 45, American rock musician (Sense Field, Further Seems Forever), suicide by drug overdose.
- Robert Stuart Edgar, 85, American geneticist.
- Sidney Grande, 88, American football coach.
- Miguel Gutiérrez, 84, Mexican footballer (Club Atlas).
- Li Xiuren, 94, Chinese politician.
- Murray Louis, 89, American modern dancer and choreographer.
- Kelly McGarry, 33, New Zealand mountain biker, cardiac arrest.
- Michael T. McGuire, 86, American psychiatrist.
- Óscar Humberto Mejía Victores, 85, Guatemalan military officer and politician, President (1983–1986).
- Francis Ormsby-Gore, 6th Baron Harlech, 61, British peer, member of the House of Lords (1985–1999).
- Bernard Piras, 73, French politician, member of the Senate for Drôme (1996–2014), Mayor of Bourg-lès-Valence (2001–2014), cancer.
- Paul Pholeros, 62, Australian architect.
- Jaime Powell, 63, Argentine paleontologist.
- Tom Pugh, 78, English cricketer.
- Kunigal Ramanath, 83, Indian actor.
- K. O. Rosenberg, 96, American politician.
- Daisaku Shinohara, 82, Japanese actor.
- Thomas Tigue, 70, American politician, member of the Pennsylvania House of Representatives (1981–2006), lung cancer.
- Dušan Velkaverh, 72, Slovenian lyricist.
- Sir Peter Whiteley, 95, British general in the Royal Marines, Lieutenant Governor of Jersey (1979–1984).

=== 2 ===
- Robert Beiner, 65, American television sports director.
- Heinz Bohlen, 80, German microwave electronics and communications engineer (Bohlen–Pierce scale).
- Seth Cardew, 81, English studio potter.
- Abram Cohen, 91, American Olympic fencer (1956).
- Bob Elliott, 92, American comedian (Bob and Ray) and actor (Get a Life), throat cancer.
- Jim Goode, 71, American restaurateur.
- Dag Gundersen, 88, Norwegian linguist and lexicographer.
- Halling, 24, American racehorse.
- Intizar Hussain, 92, Pakistani writer.
- Chris Kenny, 78, Irish-born New Zealand boxing coach.
- Luiz Felipe Lampreia, 74, Brazilian diplomat, Minister of External Relations (1995–2001).
- Aldo Bufi Landi, 92, Italian actor (Four Flies on Grey Velvet, The Magliari, The Bandit of Tacca Del Lupo).
- Sture Landqvist, 91, Swedish Olympic runner.
- Gérald Laniel, 91, Canadian politician, MP for Beauharnois—Salaberry (1962–1984).
- Rebecca Masika Katsuva, 49, Congolese women's rights activist.
- Mubeen Mughal, 23, Pakistani cricketer.
- Yasushi Nirasawa, 52, Japanese concept designer and illustrator (Kamen Rider Kabuto, Hellboy, Soulcalibur), kidney failure.
- Mike Oehler, 78, American author.
- Dana Raphael, 90, American medical anthropologist.
- Harriet Spanel, 77, American politician.
- Manuel Tenenbaum, 81, Uruguayan historian, President of the Latin American Jewish Congress (1978–2007).
- Marcus Turner, 59, New Zealand folk singer and television presenter.

=== 3 ===
- Ernesto Alais, 86, Argentine Olympic sports shooter.
- Joe Alaskey, 63, American voice actor (Looney Tunes, Rugrats, Casper), cancer.
- Big Kap, 45, American hip hop DJ (Tunnel), heart attack.
- Mark Farren, 33, Irish football player (Derry City), brain cancer.
- Richie Giachetti, 76, American boxing trainer.
- John Hirst, 73, Australian historian.
- Balram Jakhar, 92, Indian politician, Speaker of the Lok Sabha (1980–1989).
- Michał Janiszewski, 89, Polish politician and army officer.
- Brandon Astor Jones, 72, American criminal, execution by lethal injection.
- József Kasza, 70, Serbian politician and economist.
- Suat Mamat, 85, Turkish footballer (Galatasaray, national team).
- K. S. Paripoornan, 83, Indian judge, multiple organ failure.
- Valery Postnikov, 70, Russian ice hockey player and coach.
- Mercedes Richards, 60, Jamaican astronomer and physicist.
- John P. Riley Jr., 95, American ice hockey player (national team) and coach (1960 Olympic Champions US national team).
- Herb Selwyn, 90, American attorney and businessman.
- Edith Skom, 86, American novelist.
- Alba Solís, 88, Argentine singer and actress.
- Saulius Sondeckis, 87, Lithuanian violinist and conductor.
- Andy Thompson, 91, Canadian politician, Leader of the Ontario Liberal Party (1964–1966).
- Arnold Weiberg-Aurdal, 90, Norwegian politician.

=== 4 ===
- Leslie Bassett, 93, American composer, recipient of the Pulitzer Prize for Music (1966).
- Sonia Borg, 85, Austrian-born Australian screenwriter (Women of the Sun, Storm Boy).
- Marlow Cook, 89, American politician, Senator from Kentucky (1968–1974), complications from a heart attack.
- Don Davis, 82, American gun shop owner.
- Joe Dowell, 76, American pop singer ("Wooden Heart"), heart attack.
- William Gaskill, 85, British theatre director.
- Harry Glasgow, 76, Scottish footballer (Clyde).
- Harry Harpham, 61, British politician, MP for Sheffield Brightside and Hillsborough (since 2015), cancer.
- Bob Harrison, 78, American football player (San Francisco 49ers).
- Jimmie Haskell, 79, American composer and orchestrator (The Color Purple, Big, Land of the Lost).
- Paddy Kehoe, 93, Irish Gaelic football and hurling manager and player.
- Galina Leontyeva, 74, Russian volleyball player, Olympic champion (1968, 1972).
- Katie May, 34, American model, stroke.
- Kristine Miller, 90, American actress (I Walk Alone, Jungle Patrol, Too Late for Tears). (death announced on this date)
- Dave Mirra, 41, American BMX rider, X Games winner (1997, 1999, 2000, 2001, 2002, 2004, 2005), suicide by gunshot.
- Edgar Mitchell, 85, American astronaut (Apollo 14).
- Sir Jeremy Morse, 87, British banker and crossword compiler.
- Miguel Roa, 72, Spanish conductor.
- Axl Rotten, 44, American professional wrestler (ECW), heroin overdose.
- Haro Senft, 87, German filmmaker (Kahl).
- David Sloan, 74, Northern Irish footballer (Scunthorpe United, Oxford United, Walsall).
- Ulf Söderblom, 85, Finnish conductor.
- Howard G. Swafford, 96, American politician.
- Dimitris Tsaloumas, 94, Greek-born Australian poet.
- Lorna Jorgenson Wendt, 72, American women's equality advocate.
- Edgar Whitcomb, 98, American politician, Governor of Indiana (1969–1973).
- Maurice White, 74, American songwriter and musician (Earth, Wind & Fire), complications from Parkinson's disease.

=== 5 ===
- Markand Bhatt, 87, Indian theatre director and actor.
- Bill Birchfield, 80, American politician, member of Florida House of Representatives for the 21st district (1971–1974).
- Ciriaco Cañete, 96, Filipino martial artist, prostate cancer.
- Miriam Goldman Cedarbaum, 86, American judge, District Court for the Southern District of New York (1986–1998), stroke.
- Ray Colcord, 66, American film and television composer (Boy Meets World, The Facts of Life, Dinosaurs), pancreatic cancer.
- Leo Foley, 87, American politician, Minnesota State Senator (1997–2011).
- Valerie Lloyd-Chandos, 82, British Olympic diver.
- Bodil Malmsten, 71, Swedish poet and novelist.
- John Lewis Mitchell, 97, British Royal Air Force pilot.
- Nicholas Orzio, 87, American photographer.
- Bill Perkins, 76, American football player (New York Jets) and defense attorney.
- Tayeb Saddiki, 77, Moroccan playwright.
- Narender Singh, 46, Indian Olympic judoka, suicide by hanging.
- C. V. Subramanian, 91, Indian scientist.
- Carl E. Wang, 85, Norwegian politician.

=== 6 ===
- Milton V. Backman, 88, American historian.
- Alastair Biggar, 69, Scottish rugby union player (national team, British and Irish Lions, London Scottish), cancer.
- Jules Boes, 88, Belgian Olympic basketball player.
- Luciano Conati, 65, Italian racing cyclist.
- David John de Laubenfels, 90, American botanist.
- Robin Chandler Duke, 92, American social advocate and diplomat, Ambassador to Norway (2000–2001).
- Dan Gerson, 49, American screenwriter (Monsters, Inc., Big Hero 6, Chicken Little), brain cancer.
- Avril Gibb, 89, Scottish artist and calligrapher.
- Winifred Green, 78, American civil rights activist.
- Dan Hicks, 74, American singer-songwriter, liver cancer.
- Edith Kurzweil, 91, Austrian-born American writer and magazine editor (Partisan Review), complications from a stroke.
- York Larese, 77, American basketball player (Chicago Packers, Philadelphia Warriors) and coach (New York Nets).
- Anisa Makhlouf, 86, Syrian political matriarch, First Lady (1971–2000).
- James Moore, 99, American baseball player (Newark Eagles).
- Emanuel Parzen, 86, American statistician.
- Sam Spence, 88, American composer (NFL Films).
- Giacomo Tachis, 82, Italian oenologist (Super Tuscans).
- Sudhir Tailang, 55, Indian cartoonist, brain cancer.
- John L. Tishman, 90, American property developer (Tishman Realty & Construction).
- Ingrid Wallgren, 92, Swedish Olympic sprint canoeist.
- Eddy Wally, 83, Belgian singer, cerebral hemorrhage.
- David Weinrib, 91, American artist.

=== 7 ===
- Juliette Benzoni, 95, French novelist.
- D. Ralph Bouch, 83, American football and wrestling coach.
- Konstantinos Despotopoulos, 102, Greek philosopher and politician.
- Andrew Glaze, 95, American poet.
- Andrew Hintz, 52, New Zealand cricketer.
- Dogomar Martínez, 86, Uruguayan Olympic boxer.
- Emilyano Ochagaviya, 70, Russian theater actor.
- Redding Pitt, 71, American attorney and politician.
- Thomas Rea, 86, American dermatologist and leprosy researcher, cancer.
- Manuel Royes, 92, Spanish Olympic field hockey player.
- Radamés Torruella, 75, Puerto Rican Olympic sailor.
- Roger Willemsen, 60, German author, essayist and TV presenter.

=== 8 ===
- Sikiru Adesina, 44–45, Nigerian film actor and director.
- Amelia Bence, 101, Argentine actress (The Gaucho War, A Sangre Fría, Alfonsina).
- Jakov Bienenfeld, 67, Croatian executive.
- Michael Brick, 41, American journalist and songwriter, colon cancer.
- Charles C. Campbell, 68, American army general.
- Duane H. Cassidy, 82, American general.
- Ken Delo, 77, American singer (The Delo and Daly Show).
- Steven Detweiler, 68, American theoretical physicist.
- John Disley, 87, Welsh steeplechase runner, Olympic bronze medallist (1952) and co-founder of the London Marathon.
- Richard Draeger, 78, American Olympic rower.
- Johnny Duncan, 92, American actor (Batman and Robin).
- Nida Fazli, 77, Indian poet, respiratory problems.
- Giuliano Ferraris, 80, Italian Olympic ice hockey player (1956).
- Luigi Ferrari Bravo, 82, Italian academic and judge, International Court of Justice (1995–1997).
- Margaret Forster, 77, English novelist (Georgy Girl) and biographer, cancer.
- Norman Hudis, 93, English screenwriter (Carry On).
- Siegfried Lefanczik, 85, German Olympic racewalker.
- August P. Mardesich, 95, American politician, member of the Washington House of Representatives (1950–1963) and Senate (1963–1978).
- Samuel Rappaport, 83, American politician, member of the Pennsylvania House of Representatives (1971–1984).
- Willie Richardson, 76, American football player (Jackson State, Baltimore Colts, Miami Dolphins).
- Viggo Rivad, 93, Danish photographer.
- Roy Señeres, 68, Filipino politician and diplomat, Ambassador to the United Arab Emirates (1994–1998), complications of diabetes.
- William Donald Stiehl, 90, American federal judge, District Court for the Southern District of Illinois (1986–1996).
- William Stowe, 75, American rower, Olympic champion (1964).
- Zdravko Tolimir, 67, Bosnian Serb military commander in the Bosnian War.
- Violette Verdy, 82, French ballerina.
- Leon Vilaincour, 92, Polish-born British painter.

=== 9 ===
- J. B. Danquah-Adu, 50, Ghanaian politician and MP, stabbed.
- Margaret Beames, 80, New Zealand author.
- Myer Bloom, 87, Canadian physicist.
- Earle Canavan, 78, American racing driver.
- Vittorio Di Prima, 74, Italian actor and voice actor.
- Wayne England, 56, English artist (Magic: The Gathering).
- Claudie Flament, 85, French Olympic hurdler.
- Bob Halverson, 78, Australian politician, Speaker of the House of Representatives (1996–1998), MP (1984–1998), cancer.
- Michael Hanlon, 51, British science journalist, heart attack.
- Roy Harris, 82, British folk singer.
- André van den Heuvel, 88, Dutch actor (Hamelen, De rode zwaan, Lifespan), two-time winner of the Louis d'Or.
- Sushil Koirala, 76, Nepalese politician, Prime Minister (2014–2015), President of Congress (since 2010), pneumonia.
- Jackie Marriott, 87, English footballer (Scunthorpe United, Sheffield Wednesday, Huddersfield Town).
- Edwin McDonough, 72, American actor (Kinsey, Reversal of Fortune).
- Alethea McGrath, 95, Australian actress (Star Wars: Episode II – Attack of the Clones, Prisoner, Knowing).
- Graham Moore, 74, Welsh footballer (Charlton Athletic, Cardiff City).
- Walter Osterwalder, 81, Swiss Olympic rower.
- Quan Minyu, 12, Chinese singer, DIPG.
- Edgar Riek, 95, Australian entomologist and wine pioneer.
- Jagnandan Singh, 87, Kenyan Olympic hockey player.
- Elizabeth Joan Smith, 88, Canadian politician, MPP for London South (1985–1990), brain injury from fall.
- Donald E. Thorin, 81, American cinematographer (Thief, Purple Rain, Scent of a Woman).
- Leslie Thornton, 90, English sculptor.
- Jan Zoon, 92, Dutch politician, Senator (1969–1991).
- Alexandru Vulpe, 84, Romanian historian, archaeologist and academician (Romanian Academy).
- Nore Westin, 78, Swedish Olympic biathlete.

=== 10 ===
- Jakob Aano, 95, Norwegian politician, MP (1965–1985).
- David Boykett, 81, Australian rower, Olympic bronze medallist (1956).
- Claude Jeancolas, 66, French author.
- Ian Cowap, 65, English cricketer (Cheshire), cancer.
- Yuriy Dumchev, 57, Russian Olympic Soviet discus thrower (1980, 1988), world record holder (1983–1986).
- Leo Ehlen, 62, Dutch footballer (Roda JC).
- Hildesuse Gaertner, 93, German alpine skier and politician.
- Phil Gartside, 63, English businessman and football chairman (Bolton Wanderers), cancer.
- Rafiqul Hossain, 80, Bangladeshi politician, MP (1986–1988).
- Anatoli Ilyin, 84, Russian Soviet football player (Spartak Moscow), Olympic champion (1956).
- Bayard Johnson, 63, American screenwriter (Tarzan and the Lost City), cancer.
- Drew Lewis, 84, American business executive and politician, Secretary of Transportation (1981–1983), complications of pneumonia.
- Claudette Millar, 81, Canadian politician, stomach cancer.
- Asami Nagakiya, 30, Japanese musician, strangled.
- Francesco Pittaluga, 102, Italian Olympic rower.
- Lennie Pond, 75, American race car driver, cancer.
- Eliseo Prado, 86, Argentine footballer (national team, Club Atlético River Plate).
- Christopher Rush, 50, American illustrator (Magic: The Gathering).
- Günter Schröter, 88, German football player and coach.
- John Spencer, 81, New Zealand businessman.
- Fatima Surayya Bajia, 85, Pakistani novelist.
- Richard Unis, 87, American judge, stroke.
- Bob Wielinga, 70, Dutch academic.
- Abdel-Bari Zamzami, 73, Moroccan religious leader, cancer.

=== 11 ===
- Warner Batchelor, 81, Australian Olympic boxer.
- Les Belshaw, 88, British rugby league player.
- Sir Timothy Bevan, 88, British banker, chairman of Barclays (1981–1987).
- Naushaba Burney, 83, Pakistani journalist.
- Jakob Denzinger, 91, Croatian concentration camp guard.
- John Gagnon, 84, American sociologist, pancreatic cancer.
- Charles Garabedian, 92, American artist, prostate cancer.
- Thomas N. Hibbard, 86, American computer scientist.
- Douglas Inman, 95, American oceanographer.
- Jung Byung-tak, 75, South Korean football player and manager.
- John Baptist Kakubi, 86, Ugandan Roman Catholic prelate, Bishop of Mbarara (1969–1991).
- Ellison Kelly, 80, American-born Canadian football player (Hamilton Tiger-Cats, Toronto Argonauts), heart failure.
- Philip A. Kuhn, 82, British-born American sinologist.
- Warren Manzi, 60, American playwright (Perfect Crime), pneumonia.
- Mildred Shapley Matthews, 100, American science writer.
- Juan Mujica, 72, Uruguayan football player and manager.
- Sohrab Rahimi, 53, Iranian-born Swedish poet.
- Kevin Randleman, 44, American mixed martial artist, UFC Heavyweight Champion (1999–2000), pneumonia and heart failure.
- Ferenc Rudas, 94, Hungarian football player and manager (Ferencvárosi TC).
- Gene Stuart, 72, Northern Irish singer.
- Arthur Tunstall, 93, Australian sports administrator.
- John Keith Wells, 94, American Marine platoon commander (2nd Battalion 28th Marines).
- Kim Williams, 68, American songwriter ("Three Wooden Crosses").
- Peter Wood, 90, English theatre director.
- Zeng Xuelin, 86, Chinese football player and manager (Tianjin, national team).

=== 12 ===
- Eddie Barry, 96, American ice hockey player (Boston Bruins).
- Kekuni Blaisdell, 90, American Hawaii sovereign activist and professor of medicine, respiratory failure.
- Oscar Camilión, 86, Argentine lawyer and diplomat, Minister of Defense (1993–1996), Foreign Minister (1981).
- Dominique D'Onofrio, 62, Italian-born Belgian football coach.
- Kenny Easterday, 42, American actor and "man with half a body" due to sacral agenesis.
- Braulio Manuel Fernández, 74, Mexican politician.
- Robert Frederick Froehlke, 93, American lawyer, Secretary of the Army (1971–1973).
- Bergljot Hobæk Haff, 90, Norwegian novelist.
- Barbara Hardy, 92, British author.
- Keith Jeffery, 64, Northern Irish historian.
- Martin Jensen, 74, Norwegian triple jumper.
- Giannis Kalaitzis, 70, Greek cartoonist and caricaturist.
- Sossen Krohg, 92, Norwegian actress (Hotel Cæsar).
- Johnny Lattner, 83, American football player (Notre Dame, Pittsburgh Steelers), mesothelioma.
- Yvonne Porcella, 79, American quilt artist.
- Bennie Purcell, 86, American basketball player (Murray State University, Washington Generals) and tennis coach.
- Henri Rey, 83, French Olympic basketball player.
- Terry Stoepel, 71, American football player (Chicago Bears, Houston Oilers).
- Hugo Tassara, 92, Chilean football manager.
- George Tipton, 84, American composer and arranger.
- Melvin M. Weiner, 82, American electrical engineer.
- Yan Su, 85, Chinese playwright and lyricist, cerebral infarction.
- Xymena Zaniewska-Chwedczuk, 91, Polish scenographer, architect and fashion designer.

=== 13 ===
- Angela Bairstow, 73, English badminton player.
- Nathan Barksdale, 54, American heroin dealer, dramatized in The Wire.
- Yvonne Barr, 83, Irish virologist, discovered Epstein–Barr virus.
- Avigdor Ben-Gal, 79, Israeli general, GOC Northern Command (1977–1981).
- Flakey Dove, 30, British racehorse, winner of the 1994 Champion Hurdle, euthanized.
- Robin Ghosh, 76, Bangladeshi composer.
- Trifon Ivanov, 50, Bulgarian footballer (national team), heart attack.
- Barry Jones, 74, New Zealand Roman Catholic prelate, Bishop of Christchurch (since 2007).
- O. N. V. Kurup, 84, Indian poet, recipient of the Jnanpith Award (2007).
- Edward J. McCluskey, 86, American electrical engineer.
- Rafael Moreno Valle, 98, Mexican military physician and politician, Governor of Puebla (1969–1972), Secretary of Health (1964–1968).
- Giorgio Rossano, 76, Italian Olympic footballer (1960).
- Slobodan Santrač, 69, Serbian football player (Yugoslavia) and manager, heart attack.
- Antonin Scalia, 79, American judge, Associate Justice of the Supreme Court (since 1986).
- Mike Shepherdson, 85, Malaysian Olympic hockey player (1956) and cricketer (national team).
- Marley Shriver, 79, American Olympic swimmer.
- Bořek Šípek, 66, Czech architect and designer, cancer.
- Bud Webster, 63, American science fiction and fantasy writer.
- Sir Christopher Zeeman, 91, British mathematician.

=== 14 ===
- Eric Lubbock, 4th Baron Avebury, 87, British politician, MP for Orpington (1962–1970), acute myeloid leukaemia.
- Peter Bottome, 78, Venezuelan businessman (Empresas 1BC).
- Ali Brownlee, 56, English radio sports broadcaster (Middlesbrough F.C. on BBC Tees), bowel cancer.
- Muriel Casals i Couturier, 70, Spanish economist and Catalan independence leader, President of Òmnium Cultural (2010–2015), Catalonia MP (since 2015), brain injury.
- Joanne M. Cohoon, 61, American sociologist.
- Max Gruenberg, 72, American politician, member of the Alaska House of Representatives (1985–1993, since 2003).
- Drewe Henley, 75, British actor (Star Wars, Hell Boats, When Dinosaurs Ruled the Earth), asphyxiation.
- David Hey, 77, English historian, brain tumor.
- Mitchell Higginbotham, 94, American World War II veteran, member of the Tuskegee Airmen.
- Halle Janemar, 95, Swedish Olympic speed skater.
- Anselmo López, 81, Venezuelan bandola player.
- Marshall Medoff, 71, American economist.
- Shigeru Oyama, 79, Japanese-born American karateka.
- Wiesław Rudkowski, 69, Polish boxer, Olympic silver medalist (1972).
- Steven Stucky, 66, American classical music composer, brain tumor.
- L. C. Ulmer, 87, American blues musician.

=== 15 ===
- Dave Adlesh, 72, American baseball player (Houston Colt .45s/Astros), cancer.
- Paul Bannon, 59, Irish footballer (Carlisle United, Cork City).
- Paulo Barreto Menezes, 90, Brazilian civil engineer and politician, Governor of Sergipe (1971–1975).
- Piero Buscaroli, 85, Italian musicologist.
- Alcibíades Colón, 96, Dominican baseball player.
- Mary Dodson, 83, American art director (Murder, She Wrote, Full House, Taxi), complications from Parkinson's Disease.
- Lewis Feild, 59, American rodeo cowboy, pancreatic cancer.
- Edward T. Foote II, 78, American educator, President of the University of Miami (1981–2001).
- George Gaynes, 98, Finnish-born American actor (Police Academy, Punky Brewster, Tootsie).
- Constance Glube, 84, Canadian judge, Chief Justice of Nova Scotia (1998–2004).
- Victor Goldbloom, 92, Canadian politician.
- Abdul Rahman Al-Hanaqtah, 52–53, Jordanian politician, member of the House of Representatives (2007–2013).
- Virgil Jester, 88, American baseball player (Boston Braves/Milwaukee Braves), pneumonia.
- Jerzy Kroh, 91, Polish chemist.
- Louis Lane, 92, American conductor.
- Doug Lauchlan, 84, Canadian politician.
- Walter McGowan, 73, Scottish boxer, world champion (1966).
- Muhayadin Mohamed, Somali politician, Defence Minister (2008), explosion.
- Salman Natour, 67, Israeli Palestinian author.
- W. F. H. Nicolaisen, 88, German-born Scottish scholar.
- Joyce Paul, 78, American country music singer.
- Carlos Quintero Arce, 96, Mexican Roman Catholic prelate, Archbishop of Hermosillo (1968–1996).
- Hans Posthumus, 68, Dutch footballer (Feyenoord, NEC).
- Jean Rabier, 88, French cinematographer (The Umbrellas of Cherbourg).
- Kikuo Saito, 76, Japanese-born American painter.
- Fighton Simukonda, 58, Zambian football player (Nkana Red Devils) and manager (national team), diabetes.
- Steve Thompson, 50, American football player (Washington Redskins).
- Vanity, 57, Canadian singer (Vanity 6), actress (The Last Dragon), and evangelist, renal failure.

=== 16 ===
- Alisa Bellettini, 61, American television producer, creator of House of Style.
- Ronnie Blackman, 90, English footballer (Reading).
- Boutros Boutros-Ghali, 93, Egyptian politician and diplomat, Secretary-General of the United Nations (1992–1996), complications from a fall.
- Eugenio Carmi, 95, Italian painter and sculptor.
- Fred V. Cherry, 87, American military pilot, POW during the Vietnam War, heart disease.
- Mircea Costache II, 75, Romanian handball player (Dinamo București, national team) and coach (Algeria, Portugal), world champion (1961, 1964).
- Srđan Dizdarević, 63, Bosnian diplomat and journalist.
- Jack Elrod, 91, American cartoonist (Mark Trail).
- Gustavo Julian Garcia, 43, American criminal, execution by lethal injection.
- Douglas Haynes, 80, Canadian abstract painter.
- Mahmudul Islam, 79, Bangladeshi lawyer, Attorney General (1998–2001).
- Gregorio Garavito Jiménez, 96, Colombian Roman Catholic prelate, Bishop of Villavicencio (1969–1994).
- Mike Greenstein, 95, American strongman.
- Lou Holland, 74, American football player (Chicago Bears, British Columbia Lions) and investment management executive, Grey Cup champion (1964).
- Bernard Kirschenbaum, 91, American artist.
- Herbert Louis, 87, American orthopedic surgeon.
- Arman Manaryan, 86, Iranian-born Armenian film director.
- Morgan McElligott, 90, Irish Olympic rower and cardiologist.
- Belinda Nash, 69, Canadian-born American historian, cancer.
- Jim Pleass, 92, Welsh cricketer (Glamorgan).
- Jože Pogačnik, 83, Slovenian film director.
- Charles Caldwell Ryrie, 90, American theologian.
- Robert Walker, 87, American sailor, Master Chief Petty Officer of the Navy (1975–1979).

=== 17 ===
- Arthur J. Aasland, 82, Norwegian executive (Kongsberg Våpenfabrikk).
- Gelu Barbu, 83, Romanian-born Spanish ballet dancer and choreographer.
- Jesús Barrero, 57, Mexican actor and voice actor (Saint Seiya), lung cancer.
- Eduardo Chirinos, 55, Peruvian poet.
- Elias P. Demetracopoulos, 87, Greek journalist and activist, involved in the Watergate scandal.
- François Fourquet, 76, French economist.
- James W. Friedman, 79, American economist.
- Andy Ganteaume, 95, Trinidadian cricketer (West Indies).
- Alexander Gutman, 71, Russian film director (Journey Back to Youth).
- Eddie Haigh, 80, British trade unionist.
- Sophia Hawthorne, 39, New Zealand actress.
- Mohamed Hassanein Heikal, 92, Egyptian journalist, kidney disease.
- Noela Hjorth, 75, Australian artist.
- Michael Jaharis, 87, American businessman and philanthropist.
- Akbar Kakkattil, 61, Indian writer, lung cancer.
- Archie Lang, 95, American actor (Dallas, General Hospital).
- Liu Wan-lai, 89, Taiwanese translator.
- Martin McHugh, 75–76, Irish psychologist.
- Brock Pemberton, 62, American baseball player (New York Mets).
- Tony Phillips, 56, American baseball player (Oakland Athletics, Detroit Tigers, Chicago White Sox), World Series champion (1989), heart attack.
- George Redmond, 92, Irish politician.
- Norbert Verougstraete, 81, Belgian Olympic cyclist.
- Ray West, 90, American sound mixer (Star Wars, Star Trek II: The Wrath of Khan, Caddyshack), Oscar winner (1978).
- Andrzej Żuławski, 75, Polish film director and writer, cancer.

=== 18 ===
- Victorico Chaves, 83, Filipino sports administrator and politician.
- Harold C. Conklin, 89, American anthropologist.
- Jim Davenport, 82, American baseball player (San Francisco Giants), heart failure.
- Sir Tony Durant, 88, British politician, MP (1974–1997).
- Jo-Ann Episkenew, 63, Canadian author and indigenous rights activist.
- Rosario Ferré, 77, Puerto Rican writer, poet, and essayist, First Lady (1970–1972).
- Rudolf Fischer, 92, Romanian historian and linguist.
- Paul Gordon, 52, American musician (New Radicals, The B-52's), complications from heart disease.
- Brendan Healy, 59, English actor and musician, cancer.
- Abdul Rashid Khan, 107, Indian Hindustani musician.
- Bruce Lacey, 89, British artist and actor.
- Horst Mittelstaedt, 92, German biologist.
- Johnny Miller, 65, English footballer (Ipswich), cancer.
- Tom Mullica, 67, American comedy magician and actor (Finding Forrester), complications from surgery.
- Cherussery Zainuddeen Musliyar, 78, Indian religious scholar.
- Pantelis Pantelidis, 32, Greek singer-songwriter, traffic collision.
- Sigmund Pritchard, 86, Bahamian Olympic sailor.
- Angela Raiola, 55, American television personality (Mob Wives, Big Ang), lung and throat cancer.
- John E. Reinhardt, 95, American diplomat, United States Ambassador to Nigeria (1971–1975).
- Don Rossiter, 80, English footballer and politician.
- Karl Stirner, 92, German-born American sculptor.
- Thyge Thøgersen, 89, Danish Olympic runner.
- Giorgio Tinazzi, 81, Italian footballer.
- Yūko Tsushima, 68, Japanese author.
- Arumugam Vijiaratnam, 94, Singaporean athlete and Olympic hockey player (1956).

=== 19 ===
- Tamerlan Aguzarov, 52, Russian politician, Head of North Ossetia-Alania (since 2015), complications from pneumonia.
- Walt E. Ambord, 85, American football player and coach.
- Humbert Allen Astredo, 86, American actor (Dark Shadows).
- John Binotto, 96, American football player (Pittsburgh Steelers, Philadelphia Eagles).
- Mary Groves Bland, 80, American politician, member of the Missouri House of Representatives (1981–1998) and Missouri Senate (1998–2005), Alzheimer's disease.
- Din Joe Crowley, 70, Irish footballer (Rathmore, East Kerry).
- Harald Devold, 51, Norwegian jazz musician, cancer.
- Umberto Eco, 84, Italian philosopher and novelist (The Name of the Rose, Foucault's Pendulum, Numero Zero), pancreatic cancer.
- Ariel Forman, 72, Israeli actor and voice actor, lung cancer.
- Freddie Goodwin, 82, English football player (Manchester United, Leeds) and manager (Birmingham).
- Sir Anthony Hidden, 79, British judge.
- Harper Lee, 89, American author (To Kill a Mockingbird).
- Hugh Meikle, 75, Welsh curler.
- Chiaki Morosawa, 56, Japanese anime screenwriter (Mobile Suit Gundam SEED), aortic dissection.
- Sir William O'Brien, 99, British admiral, Naval Secretary (1964–1966).
- Vi Subversa, 80, British musician (Poison Girls).
- Mutsuo Tahara, 72, Japanese judge.
- Charlie Tuna, 71, American radio personality.
- Samuel Willenberg, 93, Polish-born Israeli sculptor and painter, last survivor of the Treblinka extermination camp prisoners' revolt.
- Bruno Zuppiger, 63, Swiss politician.

=== 20 ===
- Pia Bech Mathiesen, 54, Danish designer and businesswoman, cancer.
- Fernando Cardenal, 82, Nicaraguan priest and politician, Minister of Education (1984–1990).
- Sherri Cavan, 77, American sociologist.
- Kevin Collins, 69, American MLB baseball player (New York Mets, Montreal Expos, Detroit Tigers).
- Moisés Dagdug Lützow, 65, Mexican politician, stabbed.
- Ove Verner Hansen, 83, Danish actor and opera singer, heart attack.
- Kim Seong-jip, 97, South Korean weightlifter, Olympic bronze medalist (1948, 1952) and Asian Games champion (1954).
- Steven Pirika Kama, 54, Papua New Guinean Bougainvillean politician, member of the National Parliament (since 2008).
- Marvin Marcus, 88, American mathematician.
- Mike McCoy, 62, American football player (Green Bay Packers).
- Peter Mondavi, 101, American wine producing pioneer.
- José Moës, 92, Belgian footballer
- Muhamed Mujić, 82, Bosnian Yugoslav footballer, Olympic silver medallist (1956).
- Dave Needle, 68, American computer engineer.
- Jon Rollason, 84, British actor (The Avengers, Coronation Street, Doctor Who).
- Pradeep Shakthi, 60, Indian actor and restaurateur.
- Renee Valente, 88, American film and television producer (A Storm in Summer), Emmy-winner (2001).
- Xie Jialin, 95, Chinese physicist and academician (Chinese Academy of Sciences).
- Nando Yosu, 76, Spanish football player and manager (Racing de Santander), Alzheimer's disease.

=== 21 ===
- María Luisa Alcalá, 72, Mexican actress (El Chavo del Ocho, Dr. Cándido Pérez, Esmeralda).
- Akbar Ali, 90, Indian Kannada poet.
- Pascal Bentoiu, 88, Romanian composer.
- Eric Brown, 97, British test pilot.
- John Caldwell, 69, American comic strip artist and cartoonist (Mad), pancreatic cancer.
- Roger Chorley, 2nd Baron Chorley, 85, British peer.
- Chu Qing, 92, Chinese politician.
- Vlasta Dalibor, 94, Czech-born British puppeteer (Pinky and Perky).
- Jean-Pierre Detremmerie, 75, Belgian politician, suicide by hanging.
- David Duffield, 84, British sports commentator and cyclist, fall.
- George Robin Henderson, 74, Scottish mathematician.
- Andrew Herxheimer, 90, German-born British clinical pharmacologist.
- Patrick Hodgkinson, 85, British architect.
- Nina Hole, 75, Danish artist.
- Harry Hulmes, 88, American football executive.
- Charles J. King, 91, American politician.
- Peter Marlow, 63, British news photographer, influenza contracted during a stem cell transplant.
- Ivan M. Matheson, 89, American politician.
- René Matte, 81, Canadian politician.
- Kalanidhi Narayanan, 87, Indian classical dancer.
- Miroslav Nemirov, 54, Russian poet, cancer.
- Don Owen, 84, Canadian film director (The Ernie Game).
- Albert Rhoton Jr., 83, American neurosurgeon.
- Marcus George Singer, 90, American philosopher.
- Debbie Smith, 60, American politician, member of the Nevada Senate (since 2012), brain cancer.
- Richard Horner Thompson, 89, American army general.
- Betty Jane Watson, 94, American actress and singer.

=== 22 ===
- Christian Berg-Nielsen, 95, Norwegian diplomat.
- Barbara M. Clark, 76, American politician, member of the New York State Assembly (since 1987).
- Wesley A. Clark, 88, American computer engineer (LINC), atherosclerotic cardiovascular disease.
- Cristiana Corsi, 39, Italian Olympic taekwondo martial artist (2000, 2004), European champion (2002).
- Eileen Foley, 97, American politician, Mayor of Portsmouth, New Hampshire (1968–1971, 1984–1985, 1988–1997), seven-term member of the New Hampshire Senate.
- Yolande Fox, 87, American beauty queen (Miss America 1951) and operatic soprano, lung cancer.
- Steve Harris, 52, American basketball player (Houston Rockets, Golden State Warriors, Detroit Pistons), colon cancer.
- Abd Rabbo Hussein, Yemeni Army general, shot.
- Sonny James, 87, American country singer-songwriter ("Young Love").
- Cara McCollum, 24, American journalist and beauty queen, Miss New Jersey (2013), traffic collision.
- Hans Reffert, 69, German musician and composer.
- Douglas Slocombe, 103, British cinematographer (Indiana Jones, The Lion in Winter, Julia), complications from a fall.
- Yochanan Sofer, 93, Hungarian-born Israeli rabbi, Rebbe of Erlau, pneumonia.
- Lev Zbarsky, 84, Russian painter, lung cancer.

=== 23 ===
- Waqar Ahmed, 68, Pakistani cricketer (Punjab).
- José Artecona, 83, Puerto Rican Olympic sports shooter.
- Jaime Ornelas Camacho, 95, Portuguese politician, President of Madeira (1976–1978).
- Rey Caney, 89, Cuban musician.
- Ramón Castro Ruz, 91, Cuban farmer and quartermaster (Cuban Revolution).
- Bill Carmody, 58, American Catholic priest, cancer.
- Lies Cosijn, 84, Dutch ceramist.
- Angel Gabriele, 60, American comic book artist and wrestler.
- Valérie Guignabodet, 50, French film director, cardiac arrest.
- László Gyöngyösi, 88, Hungarian Olympic swimmer.
- Antanas Janauskas, 78, Lithuanian animated film director.
- Slobodan Lang, 70, Croatian politician.
- Peter Lustig, 78, German television presenter and author.
- Luis Alberto Machado, 84, Venezuelan lawyer and politician.
- Madison Marye, 90, American politician, member of the Senate of Virginia (1973–2002).
- Jacqueline Mattson, 87, American baseball player (Kenosha Comets, Springfield Sallies).
- Havo Molisale, 53, Ni-Vanuatu politician, member of Parliament (since 2008), Foreign Minister (2015–2016), Deputy Speaker (since 2016).
- George Newton, 79, British Olympic weightlifter.
- Burt Nodella, 91, American television producer (Get Smart).
- Tosun Terzioğlu, 74, Turkish mathematician.
- Joaquim Veà Baró, 57, Spanish Catalan primatologist.
- Donald E. Williams, 74, American astronaut.

=== 24 ===
- A. K. N. Ahmed, 85, Bangladeshi economist and diplomat, Governor of Bangladesh Bank (1974–1976), Ambassador to Japan and South Korea, stroke.
- Carroll Alley, 88, American physicist.
- Lennie Baker, 69, American musician and singer (Sha Na Na).
- Ryszard Bender, 84, Polish politician and historian, Senator (2007–2011).
- Adriana Benetti, 96, Italian actress (Four Steps in the Clouds, Teresa Venerdì, Before the Postman).
- Carlos Cámara, 82, Dominican-born Mexican actor.
- Miguel Ángel Coria, 78, Spanish composer.
- Michael Atul D'Rozario, 90, Bangladeshi Roman Catholic prelate, Bishop of Khulna (1970–2005).
- Ronnie Edwards, 63, American politician and civil rights activist, pancreatic cancer.
- Eddie Einhorn, 80, American broadcasting (TVS, CBS Sports, Sportsvision) and baseball (Chicago White Sox) executive, complications from a stroke.
- Ken English, 89, New Zealand rugby league player (Wellington, national team).
- Ragnar Gustafsson, 85, Swedish Olympic equestrian.
- Rafael Iriondo, 97, Spanish international football player and manager.
- Colin Low, 89, Canadian filmmaker (Universe).
- Paul MacAvoy, 81, American economist.
- Nabil Maleh, 79, Syrian film director.
- Ladislav Matetić, 88, Croatian Olympic rower.
- Jim McFadzean, 77, Scottish footballer (Kilmarnock, Heart of Midlothian).
- Peter van de Merwe, 74, Dutch footballer.
- S. F. C. Milsom, 92, English barrister and legal historian.
- Ove Bech Nielsen, 83, Danish footballer.
- George C. Nichopoulos, 88, American physician.
- Billie Nipper, 86, American painter.
- Jacques Noiseux, 79, Canadian diplomat.
- Northern Spur, 25, Irish-born French and American Thoroughbred racehorse, winner of Prix du Lys (1994) and Breeders' Cup Turf (1995). (death announced on this date)
- James C. Russell, 87, American politician, member of the Missouri House of Representatives (1962–1988), skin cancer.
- Yordan Sokolov, 83, Bulgarian politician, Chairperson of the National Assembly (1997–2001).
- Timber Country, 24, American Thoroughbred racehorse, winner of Preakness Stakes (1995).

=== 25 ===
- Sam Beall, 39, American restaurateur (Blackberry Farm) and resort executive, blunt force trauma while skiing.
- José Benardete, 87, American philosopher, heart failure.
- Bob Bryant, 71, American politician, member of the Georgia House of Representatives (since 2005).
- Tony Burton, 78, American actor (Rocky, Assault on Precinct 13, The Shining), pneumonia.
- John Chilton, 83, British jazz musician and writer.
- Ann Chowning, 86, American anthropologist.
- Jim Clark, 84, British film editor (The World Is Not Enough, The Killing Fields, Marathon Man), Oscar winner (1985).
- Ian Davis, 77, Australian politician, member of the Victorian Legislative Assembly for Essendon (1992–1996).
- Brian Barnett Duff, 85, American judge and politician.
- François Dupeyron, 65, French film director and screenwriter (The Officers' Ward).
- Habib, 85, Pakistani actor, brain hemorrhage.
- Miloš Hájek, 94, Czech historian, signatory and spokesperson of Charter 77.
- Bhavarlal Jain, 78, Indian businessman (Jain Irrigation Systems).
- Sir Peter Kenilorea, 72, Solomon Islands politician, Prime Minister (1978–1981, 1984–1986).
- John Kidd, 69, Australian athlete, Paralympic silver medallist (1976).
- Larry Kidney, 76, American powerlifter.
- Jim Lance, 84, American football coach.
- Gillis Lundgren, 86, Swedish furniture designer (IKEA).
- Alfred E. Mann, 90, American entrepreneur.
- Otto-Werner Mueller, 89, German conductor.
- Irén Psota, 86, Hungarian actress.
- William Schaap, 75, American lawyer, author and publisher (CovertAction Quarterly), pulmonary disease.
- Zdeněk Smetana, 90, Czech artist and animator.
- Mark Young, 48, American wrestler (WWE).

=== 26 ===
- Mirza Mohammed Athar, 79, Indian Muslim cleric, pneumonia.
- Andy Bathgate, 83, Canadian Hall of Fame ice hockey player (New York Rangers, Toronto Maple Leafs, Detroit Red Wings).
- C. L. Blast, 81, American soul singer.
- William Y. Cooper, 82, American artist.
- Karl Dedecius, 94, Polish-born German translator.
- Nina Dorda, 91, Russian singer.
- Robin Engleman, 78, Canadian percussionist.
- Jack Forrest, 92, New Zealand rugby league player (West Coast, national team).
- Linda Foster, 73, American politician.
- B. K. Garudachar, 99, Indian cricket player.
- Don Getty, 82, Canadian football player (Edmonton Eskimos) and politician, Premier of Alberta (1985–1992), heart failure.
- Antony Gibbs, 90, British film editor (Tom Jones, Fiddler on the Roof, Dune).
- Rudolf Harmstorf, 93, German Olympic sailor.
- Eri Klas, 76, Estonian conductor.
- Ivan Kristoffersen, 85, Norwegian newspaper editor (Nordlys).
- Loh I-cheng, 92, Taiwanese diplomat, Ambassador to Guatemala and South Africa (1990–1996).
- Michael S. Longuet-Higgins, 90, British mathematician and oceanographer (Cambridge University).
- Juan Conway McNabb, 90, American-born Peruvian Roman Catholic prelate, Bishop of Chulucanas (1988–2000), heart failure.
- Thadeo Ouano, 71, Filipino politician, mayor of Mandaue (1998–2007).
- Robert Palladino, 83, American calligrapher and academic.
- Robert Struble Jr., 72, American historian and author.
- Tom Wahman, 78, American ice hockey player (Dartmouth Big Green) and civil rights activist.

=== 27 ===
- Winston Blake, 75, Jamaican record producer.
- Michael Bowes-Lyon, 18th Earl of Strathmore and Kinghorne, 58, Scottish aristocrat, cancer.
- Dick Bradsell, 56, British bartender, brain cancer.
- James Z. Davis, 72, American judge, member of the Utah Court of Appeals (1993–2015).
- David Douglas, 52, American football player (Cincinnati Bengals, New England Patriots), brain cancer.
- Denis Fillion, 67, Canadian curler.
- Marshall Fixman, 85, American physical chemist.
- Yushu Kitano, 85, Japanese wrestler, Olympic silver medalist (1952).
- Francisco Kraus Trujillo, 89, Spanish baritone.
- Lúcio Lara, 86, Angolan politician.
- Lee Khoon Choy, 92, Singaporean politician and diplomat, MLA (1959–1965), MP (1965–1984), ambassador to Japan, South Korea, Indonesia and Egypt.
- Claude Parent, 93, French architect.
- Vid Pečjak, 87, Slovene psychologist and writer.
- Peter N. Perretti Jr., 84, American lawyer, Attorney General of New Jersey (1989–1990).
- Rajesh Pillai, 41, Indian film director (Traffic), complications from non-alcoholic fatty liver disease.
- Steven Rumbelow, 66, British theatre and film director (Autumn), sepsis.
- Farajollah Salahshoor, 63, Iranian film director.
- Anna-Leena Siikala, 73, Finnish academic.
- Bob Spicer, 90, American baseball player (Kansas City Athletics).
- Rian Sukmawan, 30, Indonesian badminton player, heart attack.
- Wiswa Warnapala, 79, Sri Lankan politician, MP (2004–2010).
- Elmer Wingate, 88, American lacrosse and football player (Baltimore Colts), complications from Alzheimer's disease.
- Yi Cheol-seung, 93, South Korean politician.
- Egon Norbert Zimmermann, 83, Austrian Olympic alpine skier.

=== 28 ===
- Sengai Aaliyan, 75, Sri Lankan author.
- Don Battye, 77, Australian composer and television producer.
- Didier Bellens, 60, Belgian businessman, CEO of Belgacom.
- Delmer Berg, 100, American resistance fighter (Spanish Civil War), last known American member of XV International Brigade.
- Moisés Julio Blanchoud, 92, Argentine Roman Catholic prelate, Archbishop of Salta (1984–1999).
- Honey Chhaya, 85, Indian film director and actor (The Best Exotic Marigold Hotel).
- Stephen Clarkson, 78, Canadian political scientist and academic (University of Toronto), sepsis following influenza and pneumonia.
- Paul Colinvaux, 85, British ecologist and author (Fates of Nations).
- John Cameron, Lord Coulsfield, 81, Scottish judge (Pan Am Flight 103 bombing trial), Senator of the College of Justice (1987–1992).
- Bram Goldsmith, 93, American banker, CEO and Chairman of City National Bank, philanthropist.
- John Johnson, 98, American athletics and football trainer (New York Giants).
- John Jones, 91, English author and academic.
- John Philip Kassebaum, 84, American attorney and art collector.
- Frank Kelly, 77, Irish actor (Father Ted, Emmerdale, Evelyn), heart attack.
- George Kennedy, 91, American actor (Cool Hand Luke, The Naked Gun, Airport), Oscar winner (1968), heart disease.
- Kumarimuthu, 76, Indian comedian and film actor.
- Jack Lindquist, 88, American child actor and theme park executive, President of Disneyland (1990–1993).
- Raúl Sánchez, 82, Chilean footballer (national team).
- Jan H van der Merwe, 94, South African physicist.
- Craig Windham, 66, American radio broadcaster (National Public Radio), pulmonary embolism.
- Liliane Wouters, 86, Belgian author.

=== 29 ===
- Alice Arlen, 75, American screenwriter (Silkwood, The Weight of Water).
- Stuart Beck, 69, American-Palauan diplomat, Ambassador to the United Nations for Palau (2003–2013), renal cancer.
- Jill Britton, 71, Canadian mathematician.
- Rudy Bukich, 85, American football player (Chicago Bears), NFL champion (1963).
- Wenn V. Deramas, 49, Filipino film and television director, heart attack.
- Helias Doundoulakis, 92, American Greek WWII resistance fighter.
- Gil Hill, 84, American police officer, actor (Beverly Hills Cop) and politician (Detroit City Council), pneumonia.
- John Hofsess, 77, Canadian writer and right to die activist.
- Fernand Jourdenais, 82, Canadian politician.
- Hannes Löhr, 73, German football player and manager.
- Josefin Nilsson, 46, Swedish singer, enlarged heart and barbiturate overdose.
- José Parra Martínez, 90, Spanish footballer (Espanyol).
- Francis Xavier Osamu Mizobe, 80, Japanese Roman Catholic prelate, Bishop of Sendai (2000–2004) and Takamatsu (2004–2011).
- Mumtaz Qadri, 30–31, Pakistani convicted murderer (Salmaan Taseer), execution by hanging.
- Louise Rennison, 64, British author (Angus, Thongs and Full-Frontal Snogging).
- Conrad Santos, 81, Filipino-born Canadian politician, MLA for Burrows (1981–1988), Broadway (1990–1999) and Wellington (1999–2007).
- Thomas Simpson, 82, Australian rules footballer (Richmond).
- Henry Snyder, 86, American historian.
- Shōichi Ueno, 79, Japanese newspaper publisher (Asahi Shimbun) and philanthropist, lung cancer.
- Nihal Ahmed Maulavi Mohammed Usman, 90, Indian politician, Maharashtra MLA (1960–1999), mayor of Malegaon.
- Ana Vieira, 76, Portuguese artist.
- Ranginui Walker, 83, New Zealand academic and writer.
