= Peter van der Merwe =

Peter van der Merwe may refer to:

- Peter van der Merwe (cricketer) (1937–2013), South African cricketer
- Peter van der Merwe (musicologist), South African musicologist

== See also ==
- Peter van de Merwe (1942–2016), Dutch footballer
- Pieter van der Merwe, British maritime historian
