= Ministry of Reconstruction (Somalia) =

Coordinates: 2°2′24″N 45°20′46″E

Federal Republic of Somalia Reconstruction
- Coat of arms of Somalia

Agency overview
- Jurisdiction: Somalia
- Headquarters: Bondhere, Banaadir, Mogadishu (Somalia)
- Agency executive: Muhayadin Mohamed, Minister

Ministry of Reconstruction is the ministry that is responsible for reconstruction in Somalia.
