= Swafford =

Swafford may refer to:

- Andrew Swafford, American politician
- Anthony Swofford (born August 12, 1970), American writer
- Howard G. Swafford (1919–2016), American politician
- Hudson Swafford (born September 9, 1987), American professional golfer
- Jan Swafford (born September 10, 1946), American composer and author
- Martina Swafford (pen name "Belle Bremer"; 1845–1913), American poet
