= Harmstorf (disambiguation) =

Harmstorf may refer to:

- Raimund Harmstorf, actor
- Rudolf Harmstorf, sailor
- Harmstorf, German municipality

== See also ==
- Harmsdorf (disambiguation)
