= Senator Matheson =

Senator Matheson may refer to:

- Roderick Matheson (1793–1873), Senator of Canada from 1867 to 1873
- Sir Alexander Matheson, 3rd Baronet (1861–1929), Australian Senator from 1901 to 1906
- Ivan M. Matheson (1926–2016), Utah State Senator from 1977 to 1989
- Senator Matheson (X-Files), a character on The X-Files

== See also ==
- Elisha Mathewson (1767–1853), U.S. Senator from Rhode Island from 1807 to 1811
- James L. Mathewson (born 1938), Missouri State Senator
