= Azita Ghahreman =

Iranian poet (born 1962)

- آزیتا قهرمان
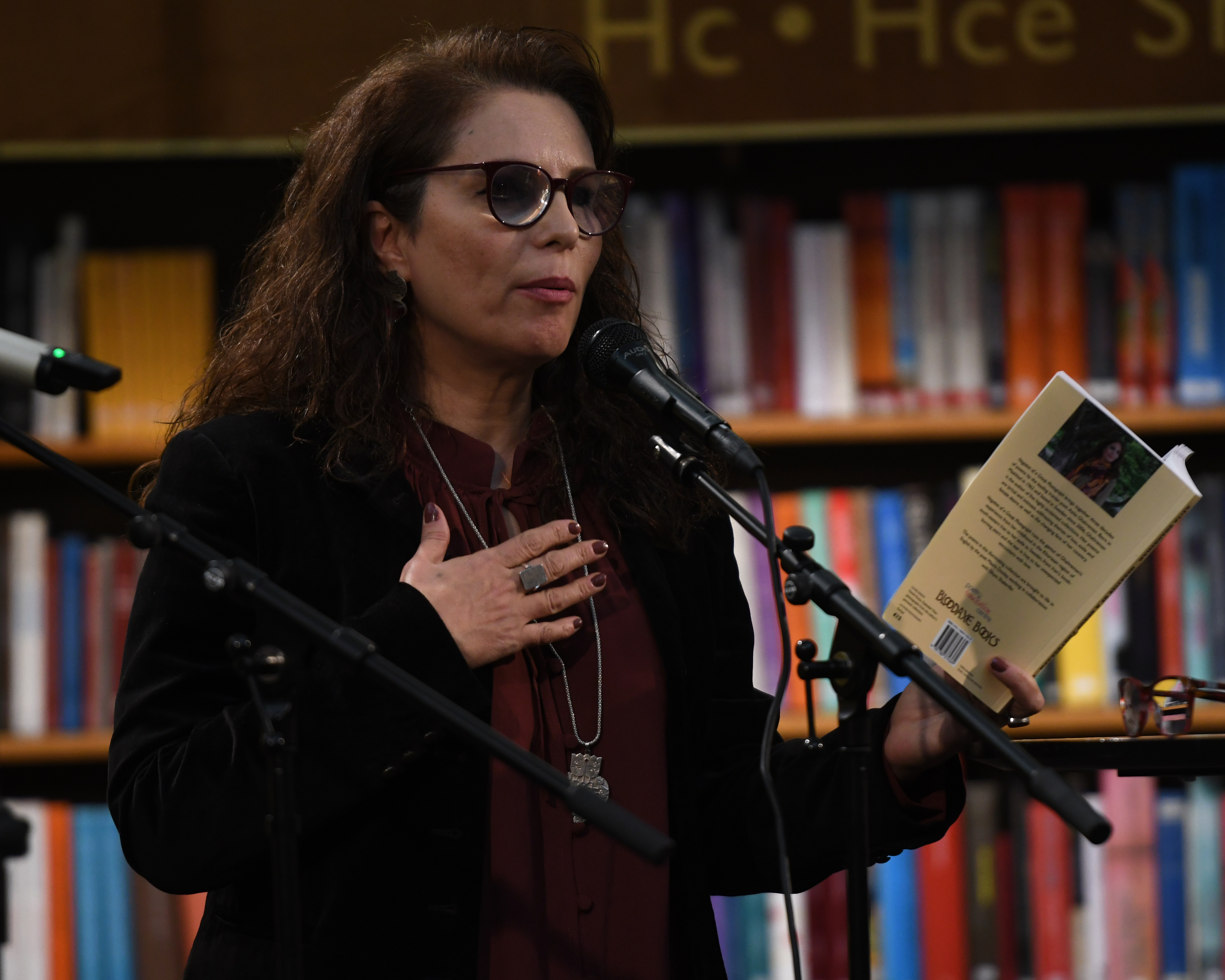
- Ghahreman in 2019
- Born: 1962 (age 63–64); Mashhad
- Citizenship: Iranian
- Education: junior high school
- Writing career
- Genre: poetry

Azita Ghahreman (Persian: آزیتا قهرمان; born 1962) is an Iranian poet. She has written six books in Persian and three books in Swedish. She has also translated American poetry.

She has published five collections of poetry: Eve's Songs (1983), Sculptures of Autumn (1986), Forgetfulness is a Simple Ritual (1992), The Suburb of Crows (2008), a collection reflecting on her exile in Sweden (she lives in an area called oxie on the outskirts of Malmö) that was published in both Swedish and Persian and Under Hypnosis in Dr Caligari's Cabinet (2012).

A collection of Ghahreman's work was published in Swedish in 2009, alongside the work of Sohrab Rahimi and Kristian Carlsson. She has also translated a collection of poems by the American poet and cartoonist, Shel Silverstein, The Place Where the Sidewalk Ends (2000), into Persian. She has edited three volumes of poems by poets from Khorasan, the eastern province of Iran, which has a rich and distinctive history.

Ghahreman's poems have been translated into various languages, including English, by the Poetry Translation Centre. A selection of her works was translated into English and published as Negative of a Group Photograph by the Poetry Translation Centre with Bloodaxe Books.

Ghahreman's husband was an Iranian poet and translator Sohrab Rahimi (1962-2016).

== Books ==
=== English ===
- Poetry Translation Centre London (2012) Featured translators: Maura Dooley, Elhum Shakerifar (collected poems in English) ISBN 978-0-9560576-8-6
- Negative of a Group Photograph,(2018) Featured translators: Maura Dooley, Elhum Shakerifar, London Bloodaxe Books, ISBN 9781780374369

=== Persian ===
- Avazhaaye havva ("Evas sånger") Ardeshir Förlag, Mashhad, Iran 1990,
- Tandishaaye paeezi ("Höstens skulpturer") Gole-Aftab förlag, Mashhad, Iran 1996,
- Faramooshi aine sadei daarad ("Glömskan är en enkel ceremoni") Nika Förlag, Mashhad, Iran 2002,
- Ghahreman, Azita (2009) (på per). Īnjā ḥūmih'hā-yi kalagh ast. Malmö: Smockadoll. Libris 11262348. ISBN 9789186175009
- Zani aamad maraa bepooshad ("Kvinnan som kom för att klä mig"), Ahange-digar förlag, Teheran, Iran 2009,
- Shabih khaani ("Rekviem"), Arast förlag, Stavanger, Norge, 2012
- Hipnos dar matab doktor kaligari, Bootimar förlag, Teheran, Iran,2014
- Ghayeghi ke maraa aavard, Solens bokförlag, Malmö, Sverige,2014

=== Swedish ===
- Ghahreman, Azita; Rahimi Sohrab, Carlsson Kristian (2009). Dikter: fyra diktsamlingar. Serie splint; 002Smockadoll; 006. Malmö: Smockadoll. Libris 11689694. ISBN 978-91-86175-06-1
- Ghahreman, Azita; Rahimi Sohrab, Carlsson Kristian (2012). Under hypnos i Dr. Caligaris kabinett. Serie splint; 004. Malmö: Smockadoll. Libris 12752249. ISBN 978-91-86175-17-7
- Ghahreman, Azita; Rahimi Sohrab, Carlsson Kristian (2013). Serendips loggbok: dikter. Serie splint; 009. Malmö: Smockadoll. Libris 14612104. ISBN 9789186175276
- Ghahreman, Azita;Rahimi Sohrab, Carlsson Kristian (2019). De mest jordliga sakernas anfall ;Malmö : Smockadoll. ISBN 978-91-86175-85-6
- Ghahreman, Azita translated by; Zohreh Azar Shahab (2022). Någonstans att gå vilse .Malmö : Smockadoll. ISBN 978-91-89099-26-5

=== Translate ===
- Jai ke piadero be payan miresad (originalets titel: Where the sidewalk ends, Shell Silverstein), tillsammans med Morteza Behravan, Hamrah förlag, Teheran (2000), från engelska till persiska
- roshanaye tariki (valda dikter av Tomas Tranströmer översatt till persiska), tillsammans med Sohrab Rahimi, Arast Förlag, Stavanger, (Norge 2012), från svenska till persiska
- a simple narrativ (valda dikter av Lundquist, Marie översatt till persiska) London: Hs Media. (2015), ISBN 9781780834290 från svenska till persiska
- Stad utan murar, city without borders (valda dikter av William-Olsson, Magnus översatt till persiska),London: Hs Media.(2015) ISBN 9789186175306 från svenska till persiska
- Zanhaa dar kopenhag (valda dikter av Hav, Niels översatt till persiska),Teheran: Bootimar , (2015) Från Danska till persiska
- Companion shade and wind, Författare: Shorab Rahimi,Översättare: Azita Ghahraman, ISBN 978-1542464451, (2017), från svenska till persiska

== Awards ==
- 2013: Prins Wilhelm, 2013, Sweden
- 2014: Ludvig Nobles Prize, Udmurtia, Russia
