= Harmsdorf =

Harmsdorf may refer to the following places in Schleswig-Holstein, Germany:

- Harmsdorf, Lauenburg
- Harmsdorf, Ostholstein

== See also ==
- Harmstorf (disambiguation)
