= Xymena Zaniewska-Chwedczuk =

Polish scenographer, architect and fashion designer (1924–2016)

- Born: 4 July 1924; Poznań, Poznań Voivodeship, Second Polish Republic
- Died: 12 February 2016 (aged 91); Warsaw, Poland
- Occupations: Scenographer; architect; fashion designer
- Spouses: Ryszard Zaniewski; Mariusz Chwedczuk
- Children: Iwo Zaniewski
- Awards: Order of Polonia Restituta, Commander's Cross with Star, 1996; Commander's Cross, 2005

Xymena Zaniewska-Chwedczuk ([ksɨˈmɛna zaˈɲɛfska ˈxfɛtt͡ʂuk]; 4 July 1924 – 12 February 2016) was a Polish scenographer, architect, and fashion designer.

== Biography ==
Zaniewska-Chwedczuk was born on 4 July 1924 in Poznań, Poznań Voivodeship (present-day Poznań metropolitan area).

From 1958 to 1981 Zaniewska-Chwedczuk was the set designer for several hundred performances of the Polish Television Theater at Telewizja Polska (including Macbeth, School of Wives, Visit of an elderly Lady) and television programs. She was an author of stage design for 5 ballet films and created scenography for 35 classical theatrical and 15 opera performances. She also arranged 20 exhibitions at the Poznań International Fair as well as 20 foreign exhibitions.

From 1981, she was preparing fashion shows in Germany. Zaniewska was one of the characters in the documentary series by Robert Laus under the title "Twentieth Century" (2010), where the profiles of Polish artists were presented.

== Personal life ==
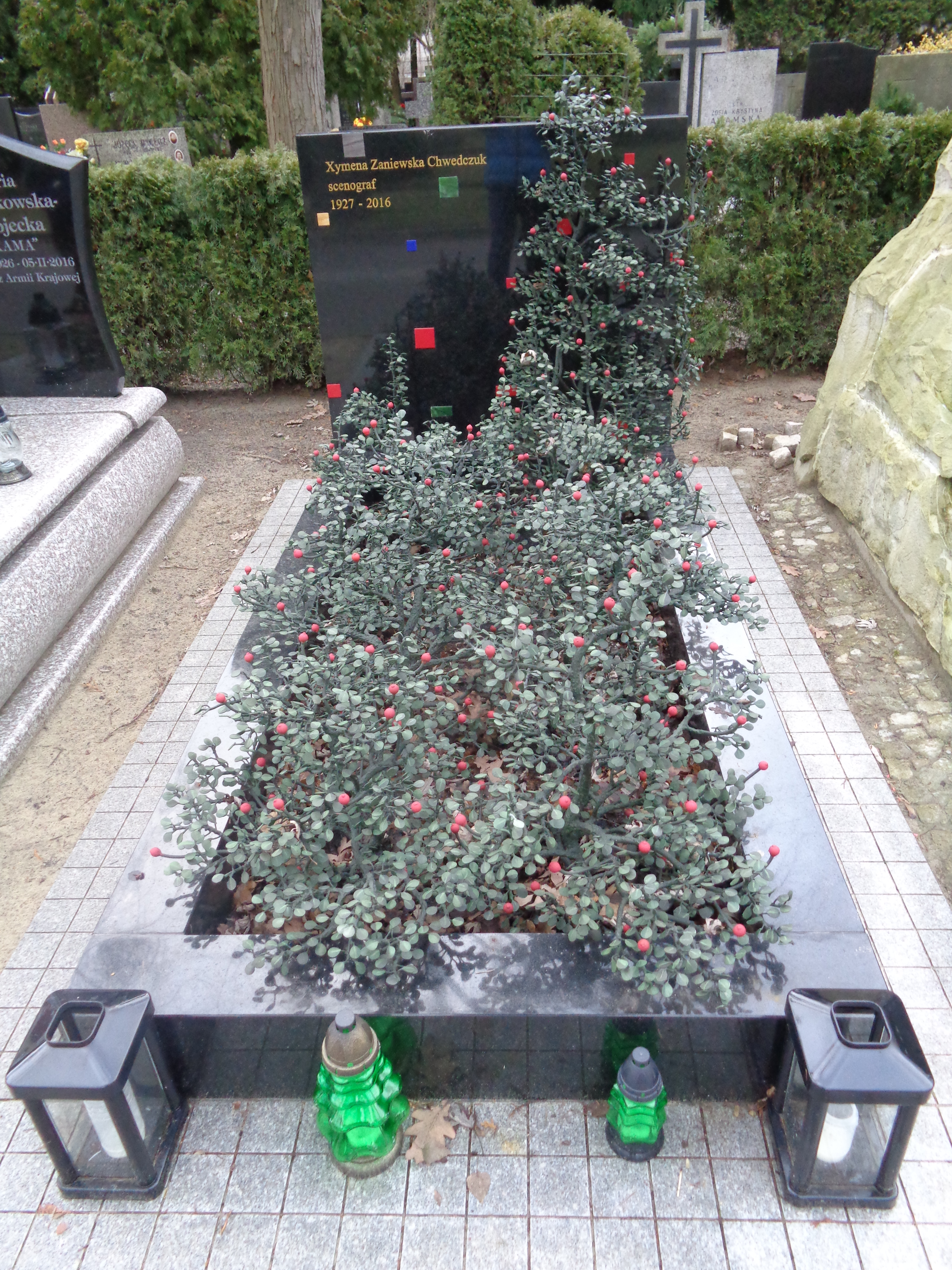
Grave of Xymena Zaniewska - Chwedczuk in Warsaw.

Her first husband was Ryszard Zaniewski, with whom she had a son, Iwo Zaniewski. She often collaborated with her second husband, Mariusz Chwedczuk, also a scenographer.

On 12 February 2016, Zaniewska-Chwedczuk died aged 91 in Warsaw.

== Awards ==
- First prize of the La Société suisse des ingénieurs et des architectes for the pavilion design - 1972.
- The Commander's Cross with Star (Polish: Krzyż Komandorski z gwiazdą) - 1996
- "A Star of the Polish National Television" - an award for "scenography and personality" - 2002.
- Order of Polonia Restituta, Commander's Cross (Polish: Krzyż Komandorski) - 07/11/2005

== Selected works ==
Her most notable scenographies include:

- Peter Shaffer's Black Comedy (Warszawski Teatr Dramatyczny; 1969)
- Stanisław Moniuszko's Śpiewnik domowy (Songbook for Home Use) (Teatr Narodowy; 1982)
- Giuseppe Verdi's La traviata (Teatr Wielki, Poznań; 1983)
