= Eternity: Our Next Billion Years =

Book by Michael Hanlon

- Author: Michael Hanlon
- Language: English
- Series: Macmillan Science
- Subject: How mankind and society will develop in the long-term future
- Genre: Futurology/Science
- Published: November 25, 2008
- Publication place: USA
- Pages: 280
- ISBN: 0230219314

Next Billion is a non-fiction book which speculates about the future of mankind written by science writer Michael Hanlon. The book is a combination of non-fiction discussions based on science about what the future might look like, interspersed with more imaginative guesses about what life will look like thousands, and millions of years in the future.

Eternity was published on November 25, 2008 by Palgrave Macmillan as part of the Macmillan Science series.

== Reception ==
Critical reception has been mixed. The SF Site gave a positive review and commented that the book was well suited to general audiences and was a good primer for people looking for an introduction to the book's themes. Michael Brooks was more critical of the work, as he felt that it "covers some fascinating ground, but remains only superficially interesting, an hors d'oeuvre rather than the main course. Faced with the prospect of eternity, that's not enough to satisfy." The Globe and Mail was also mixed in their opinion, writing "At its best, Hanlon's book offers the fascination and sense of wonder of good science fiction. At its worst, it reads like an earnest United Nations report on the challenges to be overcome in the 21st century. Luckily, there's more best than worst here."
