= Manuel Tenenbaum =

Uruguayan educator

- Born: 1934; Montevideo, Uruguay
- Died: February 2, 2016 (aged 81–82); Montevideo, Uruguay
- Occupations: Educator, historian, philanthropist

Manuel Tenenbaum (1934 – February 2, 2016) was a Uruguayan educator, historian and philanthropist. He was the author of books and articles about Jewish history. He served as the executive director of the Latin American Jewish Congress, the South American branch of the World Jewish Congress, from 1978 to 2007.

== Early life ==
Manuel Tenenbaum was born in 1934 in Montevideo, Uruguay. His parents were Jewish immigrants from Poland.

== Career ==
Tenenbaum was an educator. According to Haaretz, he was the "director of a secondary school in Montevideo, on the faculty of the Jewish teachers’ seminary and a college professor." Additionally, he was the author of several articles and books on Jewish history, including Talmud y derecho.

Tenenbaum served as the president of the Uruguay chapter of B'nai B'rith from 1972 to 1974. He went on to serve as the inaugural president of the Latin American Jewish Youth Council. He served as the president of the Central Jewish Committee of Uruguay from 1976 to 1978. He served as the president of the Latin American Jewish Congress, the South American branch of the World Jewish Congress, from 1978 to 2007.

== Death ==
Tenenbaum died on February 1, 2016, in Montevideo, Uruguay, where he was buried. He was eighty-one years old.

== Works ==
- Tenenbaum, Manuel (2005). Talmud y derecho. Montevideo, Uruguay: Facultad de Derecho, Universidad de la República : Fundación de Cultura Universitaria. ISBN 9789974205642. OCLC 183928358.
