= William Y. Cooper =

American painter, writer & illustrator (1934-2016)

- Born: February 21, 1934; Birmingham, Alabama, United States
- Died: February 26, 2016 (aged 82); Buffalo, New York, United States
- Education: Alabama State University; University at Buffalo
- Occupations: Painter, writer, illustrator, muralist, printmaker, and art teacher
- Spouse: Glendora Johnson-Cooper
- Children: 5

William Y. Cooper (February 21, 1934 – February 26, 2016) was an American painter, writer, illustrator, muralist, printmaker, and art teacher who spent most of his life in Buffalo, New York. His artwork combines an influence of his African heritage and his personal experience in America. Using symbolism, metaphors, color, and line, Cooper illustrates literal concepts in his works. Jazz music and famous African-American people are prominent themes in his art. He produced a young adult novel and a children's play later in his life, but is known for his numerous decorated murals exhibited within the United States and Ghana. Cooper was recognized in 2013 as a "Living Legacy Artist" by the Burchfield Penney Art Center.

== Biography ==
=== Early life ===
William Y. Cooper was born in Birmingham, Alabama, on February 21, 1934. He moved to Buffalo, New York, in 1954, where he remained for the rest of his life. Beginning at age four, Cooper showed a strong talent in arts. His grandmother urged him to stop pursuing the arts and focus on his math, science, and literature. Cooper continued to follow his artistic talent throughout his formal education.

=== Education ===
Before moving to Buffalo when he was 20, he studied art at Alabama State University for two years. His education was interrupted when he was drafted into the U.S. Army when World War II broke out. Despite being drafted, he was able to continue his artistic endeavors while serving for 18 months because he was the author and illustrator of the training brochures to be handed out to the U.S. Army Command stationed in Europe. Using the benefits from his G.I. Bill, Cooper traveled to Buffalo where he continued his professional education at the University at Buffalo. He received a degree in the Bachelor of Fine Arts and became a NYS Certified Art Teacher.

== Career ==
=== Professional career ===
Prior to 1995, Cooper owned an African art importing business called Bora Sanaa for fifteen years. He oftentimes traveled to West Africa during the summertime to gather antiques and artifacts from East and West Africa for his store. He was forced to close his business due to health complications in 1995. The Buffalo Arts Studio then provided Cooper with a studio from 1995 until his death in 2016. There he produced many works and mentored hundreds of aspiring artists during his lifetime. The former art director of the studio stated "he always had a long line of steady visitors to his studio." He also taught at the Buffalo public schools for twelve years and was an art teacher in the Education Department of the Albright-Knox Art Gallery in Buffalo.

=== Art locations ===
African and American history and culture were the main influences of Cooper's art. His works have been widely presented within the art community of the United States and around the world since 1969. Locations such as Niagara Falls, Buffalo, Birmingham, Atlanta, Albany, Washington, D.C., Ontario, and Ghana are examples of places where his art was and is exhibited. He exhibited his art in five solo shows since 1971 in Niagara Falls, Buffalo, and Ghana, West Africa. Cooper was one of only ten artists who were chosen to be a part of the project called "Art Across Borders" for the Pan American Exhibition. Five large murals were produced for the Women's Pavilion to celebrate historical African-American women such as Harriet Tubman, Rosa Parks, and Ida B. Wells. Several of his pieces are in the Castellani Art Museum in Niagara Falls, New York, as part of its permanent collection.

=== Recognition ===
Throughout his career, Cooper earned several awards for his artistic endeavors. The Arts Council in Buffalo & Erie County honored Cooper for two consecutive years. He earned a New York State Council on the Arts DEC Grant in 1996, and then the Annual Professional Artist Award in 1997. That same year, the Alpha Kappa Alpha sorority gave him a Community Artist Recognition Award. The Burchfield Penney Art Center selected Cooper to be a "Living Legacy" artist in 2013. He was chosen two times to be a part of the Annual Atlanta Life African American National Art Competition/Exhibition in Atlanta, Georgia. Cooper was a member of the National Conference of Artists and of the Alliance of African American Artists in America. He is also credited with founding and running the Afrocentric Artists' Collective for three years until 1981.

== Artwork ==
=== Self-definition ===
Cooper's art is known for its African and American influences. He defines himself as "an Afrocentric artist. My world view is rooted in an African frame of reference and a deep, abiding sense of the creator from whence I draw my inspiration, strength and a sense of who I am. Thematically and stylistically, my works are a fusion of two cultures: my American experience and my African heritage…My work is conceptual, subjective and highly metaphorical. The use of symbols allows me to explore literal ideas. I believe that art is the creative expression of our experiences, and probably the noblest expression of the human spirit. If so, then art must embody the highest ideals and aspirations of humankind." He states that "my work is not as much about the subject as it is about how I render the subject. I use symbols to express ideas and concepts. Color, which is never haphazardly selected, shapes the mood of the composition and creates rhythm and harmony."

=== Composition ===
Cooper's art is alive with movement, illumination, and color. They are pieced together with many elements and symbols. Cooper was not focused on what the subject is, but rather on how he crafted it. African-American contributions to American culture, like jazz music, and West African influences form his works. He used line, color, and form to generate harmony and rhythm like that of music. The composition forces the viewer to think about what he believes Cooper created, however, each person interprets his works differently according to their own experiences and lives. He believes "meanings change as each person views the work through the lens of their own experience." Pursuing imagination, creativity, expression, and ingenuity are Cooper's intentions for his art.

=== Murals ===
Although he worked in several mediums like watercolor and acrylics, and on multiple surfaces like murals and canvases, Cooper preferred to work with oils because he believed it gave him a wider freedom to make the paint do what he wanted. He is known for assisting students with 40 murals as a part of the Buffalo Art Studio's mural project. There are three of his murals in the Buffalo area that were commissioned by the city: a tribute to Martin Luther King Jr. at the Martin Luther King Jr. Branch of the Buffalo & Erie County Public Library (since closed) titled "I Have a Dream" (named after King's famous 1963 speech) completed in 1982; a Centennial Mural done in 1991 for the Buffalo Federation of Neighborhood Centers; a mural on the walls of the Colored Musicians Club Museum in the Michigan Street African American Heritage Corridor; and a mural placed in the Tri-Main/ArtSpace. One of his last murals was painted on the Buffalo Niagara Medical Campus. Cooper was also commissioned to create portraits of influential Western New York African-Americans such as James Bell and Geneva B. Scruggs.

== Additional work ==
Cooper believed "all the arts call for the imagination" and "the tools might be different but the expression is the same." He published two books in his career. Cooper's coming-of-age novel titled, 77 Jackson Street, Rear was published in 2010. It takes place in 1955 Alabama when a young boy named Denmark and his friend are kidnapped during the famous bus boycott in Montgomery while on a mission to find his father. Denmark uses the lessons he learned about the Jim Crow era from his grandmother to try to find a way to escape. His children's book that later became a children's play, called Nakai and the Red Shoes was produced in 2007. A nine-year-old girl named Nakai living in Africa found an American Sears catalog with a pair of red shoes she craved to have, but could not afford. She continues on adventures to try to raise money to buy them herself. Both 77 Jackson Street, Rear, and Nakai and the Red Shoes were illustrated by one of Cooper's sons, Joel Cooper.

== Family ==
Cooper married and had five children. His wife, Glendora Johnson-Cooper, is a native of Buffalo and a tenured librarian at the University at Buffalo. She is the youngest of eight siblings. The couple remained in Buffalo and raised their family among the community. Cooper and his wife had four sons named Michael Stubbs, Yancy Cooper, Joel Cooper, Juan King, and one daughter named Sharelle Bennigan. He has five grandchildren; Melanie, Erik, J.C. (deceased) Jaxon, and Christina; and one great-grandchild named Taylor. Cooper died in his home in Buffalo on February 26, 2016, at the age of 82.

== List of artworks ==
- I Have a Dream, 1982
- Naming Ceremony, Ghana, 1994
- Black Woman as Warrior, 2001
- Lilith, 2010
- The Raven, 2012
- Tattoos, 2012
- Study in Yellow, 2016
