= Robin Engleman =

- Born: John Robin Engleman; March 21, 1937; Westminster, Maryland
- Died: February 26, 2016 (aged 78)
- Genres: Classical
- Occupations: Musician, composer
- Instrument: percussion

Robin Engleman (March 21, 1937 – February 26, 2016) was the principal percussionist with the Toronto Symphony Orchestra and a percussion faculty member at several colleges and universities. He was also a member of the percussion ensemble Nexus, with whom he was inducted into the Percussive Arts Society Hall of Fame.

== Biography ==
Born in Maryland in 1937, Engleman studied percussion and composition at Ithaca College in New York. He worked as a percussionist in the North Carolina Symphony, the New Hampshire Music Festival Orchestra, the Louisville Orchestra, the Milwaukee Symphony, and the Rochester Philharmonic. From 1967 to 1968 he taught percussion at Ithaca College. In 1968 Engleman became the principal percussionist of the Toronto Symphony Orchestra under Seiji Ozawa. In 1971 he helped found a percussion ensemble called Nexus that would continue to play concerts with major orchestras in Europe, Asia, Oceania, and North America until 2008. Nexus, along with all the founding members, was inducted into the Percussive Arts Society Hall of Fame in 1999, and also won other awards including the 1997 Banff Center for the Arts National Award and the 1989 Toronto Arts Award. In 1972 Engleman began teaching percussion at York University in Toronto. In the 1980s and 1990s Engleman was the principal percussionist for the Canadian Opera Company Orchestra, and he later played with the New Music Concerts of Toronto. Engleman also spent time as a faculty member at the Eastman School of Music and was an adjunct professor of music at the University of Toronto. Among his numerous awards was the Banff School's Donald Cameron Award. Engleman died in 2016 at the age of 78.
