= Giuliano Ferraris =

Italian ice hockey player

Personal information
- Nationality: Italian
- Born: 16 February 1935 Bolzano, Italy
- Died: 7 February 2016 (aged 80) Bolzano, Italy

Sport
- Sport: Ice hockey

Giuliano Ferraris (16 February 1935 – 7 February 2016) was an Italian ice hockey player. He competed in the men's tournament at the 1956 Winter Olympics.
