= Jagnandan Singh =

Kenyan hockey player

Jagnandan Singh Banipal
Personal information
- Full name: Jagnandan Singh Banipal
- Nationality: Kenyan
- Born: 11 January 1929 Ludhiana, British India
- Died: 9 February 2016 (aged 87) Harrow, London, England

Sport
- Sport: Field hockey
- Club: Simba Union, Nairobi; Kenya Police; Asian Civil Service

Jagnandan Singh (11 January 1929 – 9 February 2016) was a Kenyan field hockey player. He competed at the 1960 Summer Olympics.
