= James Z. Davis =

American judge (1943–2016)

Hon. James Z. Davis

Utah Court of Appeals
- In office November 1993 – November 2015
- Appointed by: Michael Leavitt

Personal details
- Born: December 16, 1943 Salt Lake City, Utah
- Died: February 27, 2016 (aged 72) Salt Lake City, Utah

James Z. Davis (December 16, 1943 – February 27, 2016) was an American judge on the Utah Court of Appeals.

== Early life and education ==
James "Jim" Z. Davis was born in 1943 in Salt Lake City, Utah. He attended college at the University of Utah, graduating with a Bachelor of Science degree in Political Science. He was a member of Phi Beta Kappa. He received his law degree from the University of Utah College of Law in 1968. After graduation he served in the Army military intelligence for two years, ending in 1970. Davis toured as a Combat Intelligence Analyst in Vietnam. Judge Davis retired in November 2015.

Davis died February 27, 2016.

== Legal career ==
From 1971 to 1977 Davis was in private practice, practicing in Ogden, Utah. In 1973 he became the Deputy Weber County Attorney and Weber County Police Legal Adviser. In 1977 he joined the Ogden law firm Thatcher, Glasmann, and Davis where he practiced until 1982. Davis then joined the Salt Lake City based firm of Ray, Quinney and Nebeker where he worked as a shareholder and director until his appointment to the bench. As a lawyer, Davis concentrated his practice in Commercial Real Estate, Bankruptcy and Banking.

Davis was elected President of the Utah State Bar in 1991. Judge Davis was appointed to the Utah Court of Appeals in 1993 by Governor Michael O. Leavitt. He served a two-year term as presiding judge in January 1999 and is currently serving as presiding judge.

== Judicial career ==
Judge Davis was certified by the Utah Judicial Council to stand for retention in 2008 and was successfully retained in office by the Utah voters for the third time.

== Selected Cases ==
=== State of Utah v Duhaime 2011 UT App 209 ===
On January 14, 2009, a highway patrolman out looking for drug activity observed a Lincoln Town Car with Texas license plates, driven by Duhaime, traveling eastbound on Interstate 80 in Summit County. The patrolman ran a check on the car's license plate number and discovered that it was a rental car. The patrolman claimed that the rear license plate light was not working. He also observed the driver make what the patrolman claimed to be an illegal lane change. At approximately 11:06 p.m., on the pretext of the foregoing violations, the patrolman pulled the car over. The encounter with Duhaime and his wife (Wife) was recorded by a camera in the patrolman's vehicle.

The patrolman began to question Duhaime about travel plans and concluded that the driver's answers were inconsistent and nervously spoken. After returning to his car the patrolman called another patrolman and ordered him to bring a dog to sniff the car for drugs. Duhaime and his wife were retained at the sight until the dog came. When the dog arrived, it alerted on the trunk of the car, where the officers subsequently found seventy-six one-pound vacuum-sealed bags of marijuana. Duhaime was arrested and charged with possession of a controlled substance with intent to distribute, a third-degree felony.

Duhaime filed a motion to suppress the marijuana evidence, arguing that the patrolman lacked reasonable suspicion to stop him for an equipment or traffic violation and that the detention was longer than necessary to effectuate the purpose of the stop. The trial court found that the patrolman's testimony regarding the license plate light was credible, that no contrary testimony was presented, and that it was unclear from the video whether the light was functioning.

On appeal, Judge Davis authored the opinion of the court and concluded:

"The trial court did not err in concluding that the stop in this case was justified at its inception, and the patrolman's testimony about the stop was not so implausible as to justify our reassessing his credibility on appeal. However, the totality of the circumstances did not support a reasonable suspicion that Duhaime was transporting drugs, and Duhaime was illegally seized when he was detained to await the drug detection dog. We therefore reverse the trial court's denial of Duhaime's motion to suppress, and we remand the case for proceedings consistent with this opinion."

=== State of Utah v Watkins 2011 UT App 96 ===
In September 2008, Watkins accepted a job with his niece's husband (Father). Watkins temporarily moved in with his niece (Stepmother) and Father until he could afford to get a place of his own. Three of the Father and Stepmother's children lived with them during the time Watkins stayed at their home. Additionally, the Father's ten-year-old child from a previous relationship (Child) visited the Father and Stepmother "regularly" while Watkins was living with them.

Three years prior, Watkins had lost his son and stepdaughter in a tragic accident. Following the accident, his marriage suffered and he and his wife were eventually divorced. On approximately October 15, 2008, Watkins's ex-wife remarried. That same day, the Child stayed at the Father's home overnight. Upset about his ex-wife's remarriage, Watkins drank a significant amount of alcohol while the other three children were all sleeping in her room. After the Child had fallen asleep she woke up to find Watkins in bed with her kissing her on the side of her head. She asked him to stop and to leave, but then he began "pinching" or "rubbing" her buttocks with his hand. Child also testified at trial and in her interview that he "spanker her butt." Watkins finally left after Child told him to leave a second time, but he then returned and gave her a $100 bill, telling her not to tell anyone about the money.

Following the incident the Child no longer wished to visit the Father's home while Watkins was there and after a couple weeks the Stepmother asked what was wrong. The Child disclosed the details of the incident to her mother, Stepmother, and Father. The incident was reported and Watkins was arrested.

Watkins was charged with aggravated sexual abuse of a child, a first degree felony. At trial, after the State rested its case, Watkins moved to dismiss, arguing that the State had failed to prove that he was in a position of special trust with respect to the child that he had acted with the "intent to arouse or gratify the sexual desire of any person." The trial court denied the motion to dismiss. The jury convicted Watkins and he was sentenced to ten years to life in prison.

On appeal, Judge Davis authored the opinion of the court and concluded:

"The trial court did not err by denying Watkins's motion to dismiss because there was sufficient evidence from which the jury could have found both that he was in a position of special trust with the respect to the Child and that he had the requisite intent to arouse or gratify his sexual desires. Furthermore, the trial court did not err in denying Watkins's motion for a new trial because the text messages between Stepmother and Sister did not support any theory advanced by the defense at trial, did not demonstrate that Stepmother had lied in her testimony, where cumulative of evidence already presented at trial, and were not probative of sexual intent. We therefore affirm."

=== Commonwealth Property v Mortgage Electric 2011 UT App 232 ===
A home buyer (Home Buyer) executed a promissory note (the Note) in favor of her lending bank (Lender) for $417,000 secured under the terms of a Deed of Trust describing property in Eagle Mountain, Utah, as collateral for the debt. The Deed of Trust identified MERS as the "nominee for Lender and Lender's successors and assigns" and as the "beneficiary under this Security Instrument." In the original Note, Lender assigned its servicing rights to Citi, which at all relevant times remained the servicer of the Note and to which Home Buyer made payments. Home Buyer defaulted on the Note, and on approximately December 8, 2009, the Successor Trustee to the Deed of Trust recorded a Notice of Default and Election to Sell.1 On December 6, 2009, MERS assigned its "beneficial interest" to Citi, which was recorded on January 6, 2010. On December 31, 2009, a quitclaim deed was recorded by which Home Buyer transferred her interest in the Eagle Mountain property to CPA.

CPA filed a complaint in February 2010 that stated four causes of action based upon its assertion that the Deed of Trust was separated from the Note shortly after being executed and therefore is and "has been unenforceable by defendant[s]" for quite some time.

MERS and Citi moved to dismiss CPA's complaint, stating that CPA's argument "that transferring a note secured by a trust deed as part of a securities transaction renders the note an unsecured obligation . . . is without legal support and fails as a matter of law." In its memorandum decision, the district court converted the motion to dismiss to one for summary judgment because of what it determined to be extraneous document evidence attached to both parties' pleadings. ("[A] motion to dismiss 'shall be converted into one for summary judgment if matters outside the pleadings are presented to and not excluded by the court.'" (quoting Utah R. Civ. P. 12(b))). The district court subsequently granted summary judgment in favor of MERS and Citi. In rendering its decision, the district court ruled that "[t]he premise underlying each of [CPA's] causes of action is an assertion that Defendants lost the right to initiate foreclosure proceedings on the property when the Note was 'securitized.'" The district court then characterized this underlying principle as a "mere conclusory allegation," and found that "the express terms of the Trust Deed unassailably provide that MERS has the right to foreclose upon the Property, even if [Lender] sold the Note." CPA moved to reconsider on the ground that the conversion of the motion to dismiss into a motion for summary judgment was improper. The district court denied CPA's motion to reconsider. CPA now appeals from the final summary judgment order, arguing again that the district court's conversion of the motion to dismiss into a motion for summary judgment was improper. CPA requests that we reverse and remand with instructions for the district court to deny MERS and Citi's motion to dismiss based on its assertion that its "underlying principle"‐‐that securitization stripped MERS and Citi of the right to initiate foreclosure proceedings on the Eagle Mountain property‐‐is a factual statement.

Judge Davis offered the opinion of the court:

CPA's "underlying principle" that securitization nullified MERS's and Citi's rights as expressly set forth in the Deed of Trust is an incorrect legal assertion. Thus, even if the district court had not converted Defendants' motion to dismiss into a motion for summary judgment, its ruling on the motion to dismiss would have produced the same result‐‐a dismissal of CPA's case. In other words, any presumed error in converting the motion was harmless. Therefore, we affirm the district court's order dismissing CPA's complaint.

=== Bud Bailey Construction, Inc. v Cache Valley Bank 2011 UT App 149 ===
On April 3, 2006, Bud Bailey obtained a judgement against Construction Associates, Inc., in the amount of $46,919.79. On November 1, 2006, Bud Bailey served a writ of garnishment on an administrative assistant at Cache Valley Bank. The writ was accompanied by interrogatories that provided space for the Bank's responses. The Bank's answers, which were filed with the court indicated that the Bank held $17,901.94 in Construction Associates' checking account. One of the interrogatories stated, "You man deduct from the amount to be withheld money owed to you by the defendant or the plaintiff, if the amount is not disputed. If you make this deduction, state the amount deducted and the name of the person indebted to you." The space for the Bank's answer to this question was left blank.

According to the rule 64D of the Utah Rules of Civil Procedures the court's instructions in the writ of garnishment, the Bank was responsible to deliver the funds to Bud Bailey if it did not receive a request for hearing from Construction Associates within twenty days. When Bud Bailey had not received the funds by January 25, 2007, the trial court issued a Garnishee Order to Show Cause in re Contempt for the Bank's failure to comply with the writ.

The Bank's counsel later informed Bud Bailey and the trial court that the Bank had placed a lien on the funds and that it would thereafter provide the court with a "proper response to the garnishment." On the day of the hearing on the order of show cause, the Bank filed its Response to the Garnishment and Order to show cause in re Contempt, claiming a right to offset the funds to satisfy over $300,000 in outstanding loans made by the Bank to Construction Associates and providing documents evidencing its security interest in the checking account. The court continued the hearing to April 2, 2007. Bud Bailey subsequently discovered that Construction Associates had deposited additional funds into its checking account after the writ of garnishment was issued and that the Bank had permitted Construction Associates to draw on those funds.

In an order issued May 9, 2007, the trial court found that the Bank was no in compliance with the garnishment statute and that it failed to provide any notice of an offset of right to offset within the required time period. The court further found that the Bank violated an order of the court contained in the writ by allowing checks drawn on funds deposited after the writ of garnishment was issued to clear rather than using them to pay the garnishment. As a result, the trial court ordered the Bank to pay the entire sum remaining on the garnishment, $38,769.71, as well as Bud Bailey's attorney fees.

The bank appealed, conceding that it had erred by failing to claim the offset in its response to the interrogatories but arguing that the writ of garnishment did not apply to the after-deposited funds. This court agreed, holding that "the Writ of Garnishment only had effect with regard to the funds that were held by the Bank at the time the Write was served. However, we remanded with instructions for the trial court to make "a determination for what amount, if any, Bank should be required to pay solely for its failure to answer adequately the interrogatory served with the Writ."

On remand, the trial court found that the Bank had "failed to provide any adequate justification for its failure to properly respond to Bud Bailey's garnishment interrogatory regarding the offsets." The trial court found that the just amount to assess against the bank for its failures is the full amount that it held for Construction Associates at the time Bud Bailey served its writ of garnishment plus his attorney fees. The bank appeals.

Judge Davis offered the opinion of the court and concluded:

The trial court erred in assessing a penalty against the Bank for its failure to correctly answer the interrogatory. Furthermore, the trial court made no factual findings to support an assessment of liability against the Bank for any amount beyond the attorney fees incurred as a result of the Bank's error. Finally, an appropriate award of attorney fees to Bud Bailey was no limited to fees incurred before the Bank informed Bud Bailey of its error. We reverse and remand for the trial court to conduct a new evidentiary hearing to determine the amount of damages, if any; to reassess the award of attorney fees; and to determine the appropriate amount of attorney fees to which Bud Bailey is entitled on appeal."
