= Mitchell Higginbotham =

Tuskegee Airman (1921–2016)

- Born: March 2, 1921; Amherst, Virginia
- Died: February 14, 2016 (aged 94); Rancho Mirage, California
- Education: University of ColoradoMS in Labor Relations
- Occupation: U.S. Army Air Force
- Years active: 1942-1946 (active), 1946-1962 (reserve)
- Known for: Tuskegee Airmen
- Relatives: Robert Higginbotham (brother)
- Awards: Congressional Gold Medal awarded to the Tuskegee Airmen

Mitchell Higginbotham (March 2, 1921 – February 14, 2016) was a U.S. Army Air Force officer who was a member of the African American World War II fighter group known as the Tuskegee Airmen.

== Biography ==
=== Early life ===
Higginbotham was born on March 2, 1921 in Amherst, Virginia, to Plinkam L Higginbotham and Hester Higginbotham. He has a younger brother, Robert, who also became a member of the U.S. military.

=== Military career ===
Higginbotham joined the U.S. military in the summer 1942. He subsequently was accepted into the Tuskegee Army Airfield Class TE-44-K from which he graduated on February 1, 1945, with a commission as a Second Lieutenant. Higginbotham became one of the original members of the Tuskegee Airmen when he was assigned to the 477th Bombardment Group. He served on active duty through the end of World War II; in 1946, he left active duty but continued as a member of the U.S. Army Air Force Reserves. He initially flew fighter aircraft but eventually moved up to flying B-52s.

Higginbotham's younger brother Robert also joined the military during World War II two years after his older brother; however, Robert Higginbotham became a pilot for the Navy Air Corps.

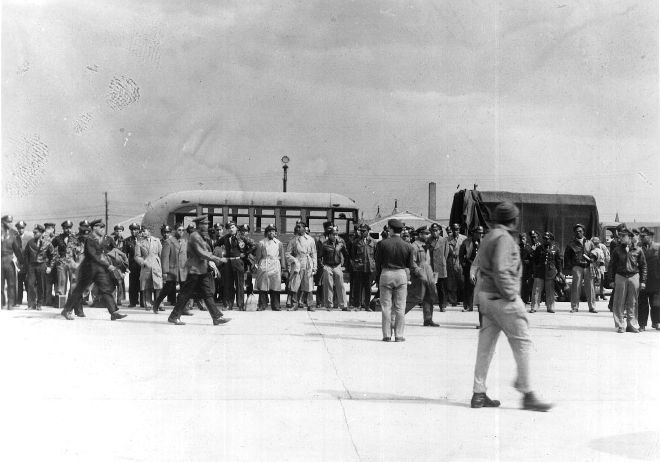
Arrested African-American officers of the 477th Bombardment Group at Freeman Field, Indiana, await transport to Godman Field, Kentucky, April 1945.

Higginbotham was one of 100 black servicemen who were arrested for attempting to enter an officers club reserved for white officers. This event became known as the Freeman Field Mutiny; it is widely seen as a key moment in the path towards full integration of the U.S. Armed Services.

=== Civilian career ===
Following his years of active duty, Higginbotham went to work for the Los Angeles Airport Advisory Committee, working as a registrar at the Pittsburg Airport. He also served as a probation officer for nearly thirty years.

== Awards ==
Higginbotham and his brother Robert both attended the ceremony in 2007 where the Congressional Gold Medal was collectively presented to the Tuskegee Airmen for their contributions during World War II. He also received "Man of the Year" Award from the Los Angeles Chapter of the Tuskegee Airmen, Inc in 1996.

== See also ==
- 477th Bomber Group
- Freeman Field Mutiny
- Tuskegee Airmen
