= Ariel Forman =

Israeli actor (1943–2016)

- אריאל פורמן
- Born: 21 November 1943; Tel Aviv, Mandatory Palestine
- Died: 19 February 2016 (aged 72); Nahariya, Israel
- Occupations: Actor; voice actor
- Years active: 1962–2016
- Children: 2

Ariel Forman (Hebrew: אריאל פורמן; 21 November 1943 – 19 February 2016) was an Israeli actor and voice actor.

== Biography ==
Born and raised in Tel Aviv, Forman began his career in the Israel Defense Forces (IDF), serving in the Central Command Band along with Oshik Levi and other artists. After being discharged, he studied under the guidance of Uta Hagen and Stella Adler in New York City. Forman performed in many theatres across Israel, mainly performing at the Habima Theatre between 1971 and 1975. Forman was also a participant in several Yiddish-speaking plays and acted on films and television as well. He made his debut film appearance in Sallah Shabati featuring Chaim Topol.

Forman was also a voice dubber. He performed the Hebrew voice roles of King Triton in The Little Mermaid (except for the third film), Zeus in Hercules, Monsieur D'Arque in Beauty and the Beast, Lafayette in The Aristocats, King Hubert in Sleeping Beauty, John Silver in Treasure Planet, and Francis in Oliver & Company.

=== Personal life ===
Forman had two sons, one of whom is an actor. He also had six grandchildren.

== Death ==
Forman suffered from chronic obstructive pulmonary disease (COPD), which resulted in him developing lung cancer. He died from cancer in a Nahariya hospital on February 19, 2016, at the age of 72. Forman was buried in a cemetery in Yas'ur.
