= Linda Foster (politician) =

American politician

Member of the New Hampshire House of Representatives from the 4th Hillsborough district
- In office December 1, 2004 – December 1, 2010
- Preceded by: Timothy Allen
- Succeeded by: William Condra

Member of the New Hampshire House of Representatives from the 10th Hillsborough district
- In office December 2, 1992 – December 4, 2002

Personal details
- Born: February 8, 1943 Portland, Maine
- Died: February 26, 2016 (aged 73) Mont Vernon, New Hampshire
- Party: Democratic
- Spouse: Bernard Scott Foster
- Education: University of Maine (BSEd)

Linda Timberlake Foster (February 8, 1943 – February 26, 2016) was an American politician who served multiple terms in the New Hampshire House of Representatives, retiring as Deputy Speaker in 2010.

A member of the Democratic Party, she was first elected in 1992 but lost her seat following redistricting in 2002. She ran again in 2004 and served another three terms.
