= Naushaba Burney =

Pakistani journalist

Naushaba Burney (November 1932 – 11 February 2016) was a journalist and a social activist from Pakistan. She was the country's first female journalist.

== Background ==
Burney was born in Nagpur, British India (now in India) in November 1932. She had six siblings (4 brothers and 2 sisters) including Ameena Saiyid, the Managing Director of Oxford University Press, Karachi. At the independence of Pakistan in 1947, she migrated to Pakistan with her family. She was married to the journalist, Iqbal Hassan Burney, founder and editor of Outlook Magazine, with whom she had one son and two daughters. I. H. Burney also was instrumental in founding the Karachi Press Club. She completed her master's degree in Journalism at the University of California, Berkeley in the 1950s. She also taught journalism at the University of Karachi.

== Career ==
Burney worked in a number of organisations including Pakistan International Airlines (PIA), Dawn newspaper and Aga Khan University, Karachi.

== Death and legacy ==
Naushaba Burney died after an asthma attack at South City Hospital in Karachi, Pakistan at age 83. She was hospitalized a day earlier due to a pneumonia infection.

Pakistan's noted journalist and her former colleague at Dawn newspaper, Zubeida Mustafa remembered her being a close friend while working at this newspaper in the mid-1990s. According to her she was a fine person who had a lot of courage.
