= Valerie Lloyd-Chandos =

British diver

Personal information
- Born: 24 May 1933; Ealing, Great Britain
- Died: 5 February 2016 (aged 82); Bergerac, Dordogne, France

Sport
- Sport: Diving

Pauline Valerie Lloyd-Chandos (24 May 1933 – 5 February 2016) was a British diver, who ranked 12th in the Women's 10m platform event at the 1952 Summer Olympics. In July 1950, she competed in the National Diving Championship at Morecambe and Heysham. Part of her practice for this event involved diving into a sand pit in her back garden in Teddington.
