= Jan Zoon =

Dutch politician (1923–2016)

Member of the Senate
- In office 16 September 1969 – 11 June 1991

Personal details
- Born: 16 June 1923 Rotterdam, Netherlands
- Died: 9 February 2016 (aged 92) Oostvoorne, Netherlands
- Party: Labour Party
- Education: Nederlandse Economische Hogeschool

Jan Herbert Zoon (16 June 1923 – 9 February 2016) was a Dutch politician and economist. He served as a member of the Senate of the Netherlands between 1969 and 1991 for the Labour Party. Zoon spent most of his working life at the Economisch-Technologisch Instituut voor Friesland, including four years as its director.

== Career ==
Zoon was born on 16 June 1923 in Rotterdam. He attended the Hogere Burgerschool until 1941. He studied economy at the Nederlandse Economische Hogeschool between 1946 and 1954. In 1969 earned he earned his PhD with a thesis on industrialisation in Friesland under Henk Lambers at the same university.

From 1942 to 1946 Zoon worked for the municipality of Rotterdam. Afterwards he became editor and secretary at the Economisch-Statistische Berichten. In 1960 Zoon moved to Leeuwarden to become adjunct director of the Economisch-Technologisch Instituut voor Friesland. He continued in this capacity for twenty years and in 1980 started as director of the institute. He fulfilled this latter function for four years.

On 16 September 1969 Zoon became member of the Senate for the Labour Party. In the Senate he became the party spokesperson for financial and economic affairs. As oldest member of the Senate he fulfilled the position of President of the Senate at times. He served in the Senate until 11 June 1991.

Zoon was made a Knight in the Order of the Netherlands Lion on 29 April 1981. He was made Commander in the Order of Orange-Nassau on 27 April 1990. Zoon died on 9 February 2016 in Oostvoorne, aged 92.

Zoon was married and had four children.
