= Sohrab Rahimi =

Iranian poet

- سهراب رحیمی
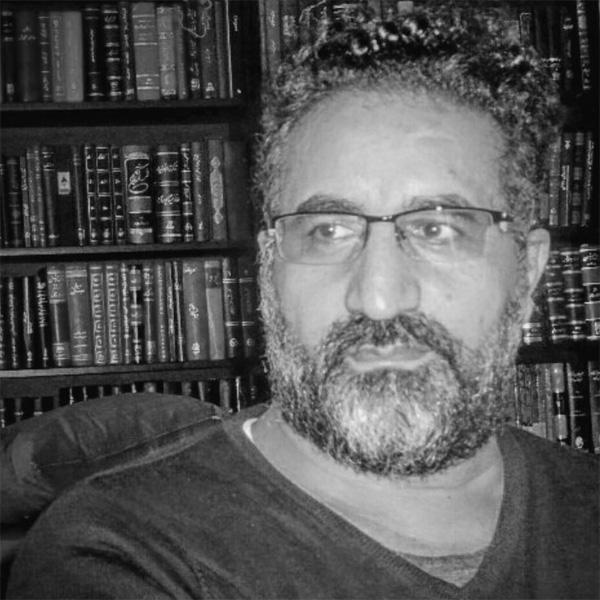
- Born: December 20, 1962; Shahr-e Kord, Iran
- Died: February 11, 2016 (aged 53)
- Known for: Poetry
- Spouse: Azita Ghahreman

Sohrab Rahimi (Persian: سهراب رحیمی; December 20, 1962 – February 11, 2016), was an Iranian poet, born in Shahrekord, Iran. He has written five books in Persian and two books in Swedish. He has also translated Persian poetry.

Rahimi's poems have been translated into various languages.

Rahimi's body was found in a burnt car near Malmö on February 11, 2016, at the age of 53. He was married to Azita Ghahreman.

== Books ==
- The House of Dreams (Persian), 1995
- The Spoiled Kernels of Time (Persian) 1996
- White balsam (Persian and Swedish) 2000
- A letter to you (Persian), 2006
- The geometric drawing of melancholia, (poetry in Persian), 2011
- The librarian of the war (novel in Swedish), 2011
- The inevitable journey (poetry in Swedish), 2012
- Compulsive seasons (poetry in Persian), 2012

== Awards ==
- 2013 Nikolaj Gogols Prize
