= Elias P. Demetracopoulos =

Greek journalist and dissident

- Born: 1 December 1928; Athens, Greece
- Died: 17 February 2016 (aged 87); Athens, Greece
- Occupation: Journalist

Elias Panayotis Demetracopoulos (Greek: Ηλίας Παναγιώτης Δημητρακόπουλος, 1 December 1928 – 17 February 2016) was a Greek journalist and dissident during the Greek military junta of 1967–1974 ("Regime of the Colonels").

== Life ==
Elias Demetracopoulos was born in Athens. As a 12-year-old in occupied Greece, he engaged in resistance efforts against the Nazis, for which he was imprisoned and tortured. His life was spared by moving him to a mental hospital for the last year of World War II. He survived and during the Greek Civil War was shot while trying to save relatives who’d been kidnapped by the Communists.

He studied at Athens School of Economics and Business.

From 1950 to 1958, he was political editor of I Kathimerini. In 1951 he became a correspondent for Macedonia and Thessaloniki. Demetracopoulos was also political editor for Ethnos and co-founded the English-language Athens Daily Post. He was correspondent for the North American Newspaper Alliance and the New York Herald Tribune.

After the Greek military dictatorship took power in 1967, he narrowly escaped to Washington, D.C., where he lived in exile and led the fight to restore democracy in his homeland, challenging both Democratic and Republican Administrations. In June 1970, the Greek dictatorship revoked his citizenship.

In 1968, Demetracopoulos uncovered illegal campaign donations of $549,000 given by the Greek military dictatorship to the 1968 presidential campaign of Richard Nixon and Spiro Agnew. He gave the information to Larry O'Brien, then chairman of the Democratic National Committee, who did not expose the cash transfer but issued a call for an inquiry into the activities of Thomas A. Pappas Demetracopoulos was threatened with deportation by John N. Mitchell and Murray Chotiner for his work in exposing the scandal. Some historians also believe the White House Plumbers broke into the Watergate complex in order to search for files confirming the payment.

Through suits against the Federal Bureau of Investigation (FBI) and Central Intelligence Agency (CIA), Demetracopoulos found out that he had been under extensive surveillance by those agencies from at least November 9, 1967, to October 2, 1969, August 25, 1971, to March 14, 1973 and February 19 to October 24, 1974.

After 1975, he gained access to secret government files in Athens out of which he learned that there had been several attempts by the Greek junta to kidnap and kill him.

In 1967, Demetracopoulos engaged attorney William A. Dobrovir to investigate the involvement of the United States. Dobrovir uncovered hundreds of documents from the FBI, CIA, Department of State, Department of Justice and Department of Defense, via the Freedom of Information Act.

Some of the documents indicated that copies were sent to the National Security Council headed by Henry Kissinger at the time.

It was not before March 1977 that the NSC agreed to release skeletal computer indices of these documents. In the computer indices, Demetracopoulos found a reference to a document referring to his death in a prison in Athens on 18 December 1970. For the next seven years, Dobrovir wrote letters to Kissinger asking for copies of the document. Kissinger eventually replied that he could not find such a copy.

Demetracopoulos had personal friendships across the political spectrum, including Admiral Arleigh Burke, Louise Gore and Senators Ted Kennedy, Strom Thurmond, Frank E. Moss, Quentin N. Burdick and Mike Gravel.

In 2008, he received the Order of the Phoenix.

Demetracopoulos died in Athens from natural causes on 17 February 2016, at the age of 87.

James H. Barron wrote the first biography of Elias Demetracopoulos, The Greek Connection.

== Works ==
- Impression on Formosa : Free China as others find her, Taipei, Taiwan, China : Free China review, 1962. OCLC 51268352
- Greece, a new Vietnam? OCLC 11172260
- Ta chersaia synora tés Ellados, Thessaloniki Hidryma Meletou Chersonerou tou Haimou 1991. OCLC 432947440

== Sources ==
- Christopher Hitchens: Hostage to History, Cyprus from the Ottomans to Kissinger 1984 pp 87–88 et al.
