= Manuel Royes =

Spanish field hockey player (1924–2016)

Personal information
- Nationality: Spanish
- Born: 1924
- Died: 7 February 2016 (aged 92)

Sport
- Sport: Field hockey

Manuel Royes (1924 – 7 February 2016) was a Spanish field hockey player. He competed in the men's tournament at the 1948 Summer Olympics.
