= Hildesuse Gaertner =

German alpine skier (1923–2016)

Hildesuse Gaertner (10 February 1923 – 10 February 2016) was a German alpine skier, born in Freiburg. Between 1949 and 1952, she became a sevenfold German champion in alpine skiing.

She retired to work as a journalist and became later a writer of travel literature. She died in Freiburg on 10 February 2016 at the age of 93.
