= Pia Bech Mathiesen =

Danish designer and entrepreneur

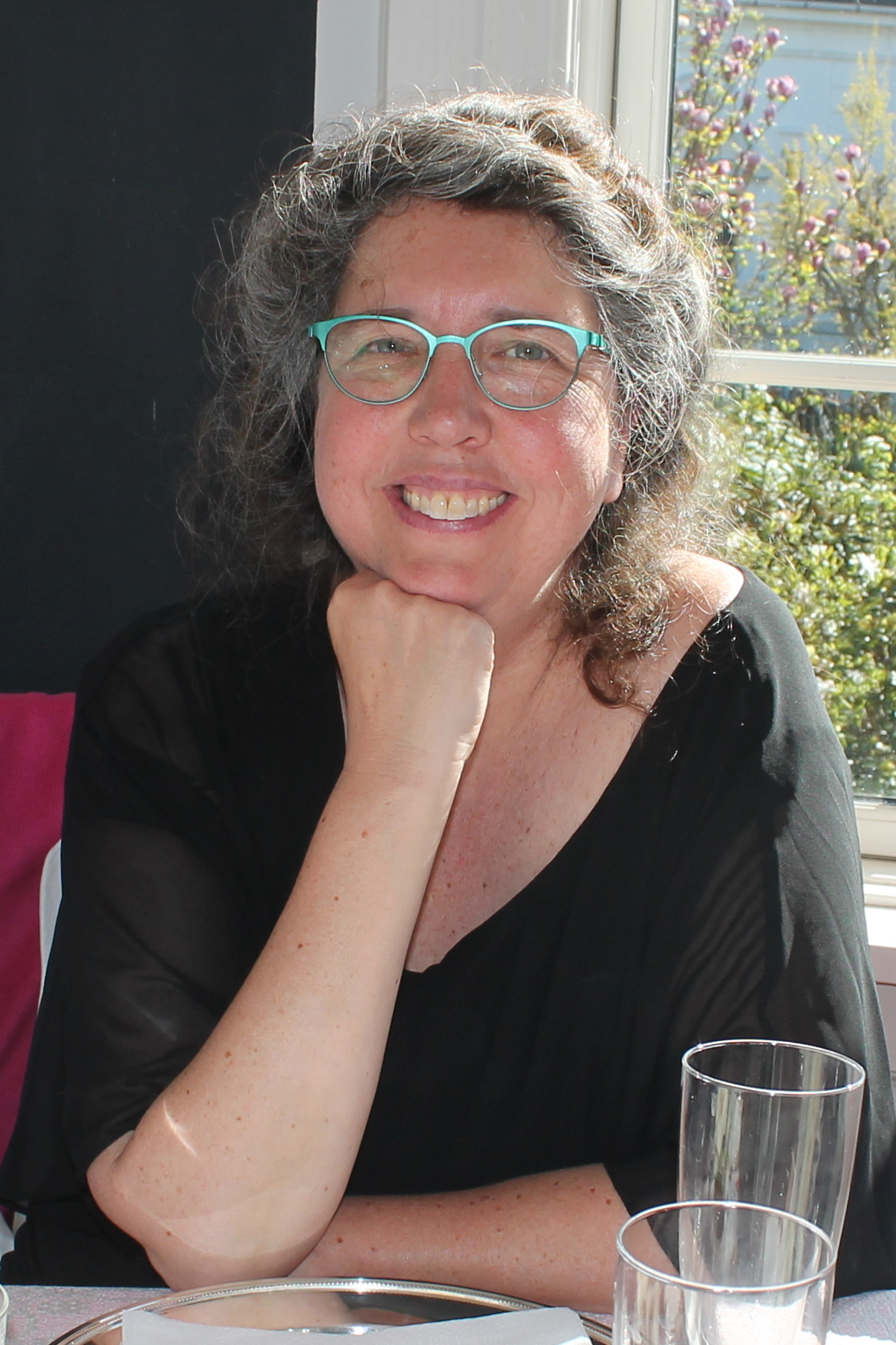
- Born: 31 January 1962
- Died: 20 February 2016 (aged 54)
- Education: Royal Danish Academy of Fine Arts, California Polytechnic State, Copenhagen Business School
- Occupation: Architect
- Practice: Danish national railway company

Pia Bech Mathiesen (31 January 1962 – 20 February 2016) was a Danish designer and entrepreneur. She headed the Danish Design Council and was CEO of the Universe science amusement park on the island of Als.

== Biography ==
Born in 1962, Bech Mathiesen studied design at the Royal Danish Academy of Fine Arts, graduating in 1987. Thereafter she studied design and economics at California Polytechnic State University, San Luis Obispo (1988) and economics, organization and working sociology at Copenhagen Business School (1994).

Bech Mathiesen was head of design at the Danish national railway company DSB (1996–2010) before she joined Universe in 2013. In parallel, she held board positions at the Danish Design Museum, the Danish Design Council, Design School Koldning and the University of Southern Denmark. Beginning in 2014, she chaired Sønderjyllands Symfoniorkester. She died on 20 February 2016, aged 54.
