= Don Davis (gun retailer) =

American businessman

- Born: April 10, 1933
- Died: February 4, 2016 (aged 82); Indianapolis, Indiana
- Occupation: Gun store owner

Don Davis (April 10, 1933 – February 4, 2016) was an American gun retailer, the owner of Don's Guns and Galleries, a firearms retailer in Indianapolis, Indiana. He claimed to be the largest independent gun dealer in the United States, and his store has been called the largest public display of firearms in America. For a while, he operated multiple 24-hour stores in the Indianapolis area.

On October 4, 1997, Davis' Greenwood, Indiana, store was robbed, and employee Steven Stapleton was shot and killed. Soon after the incident, Don closed all his stores except for the Lafayette Road flagship store, which reduced its business hours. On September 17, 2012, a customer visiting the store to utilize its indoor shooting range intentionally shot a store employee twice. The employee immediately returned fire, killing his attacker.

Davis was named among the top five dealers who sell guns to criminals by the U.S. Department of Justice, ranked at #4. He said that the problem was not with his selling the guns, which requires FBI screening, but with those who purchase them and privately resell them, which he describes as a major loophole in the gun control laws. Some area residents feel that Davis catered to a less-than-upstanding clientele, largely profiting from inflated prices for people that have been described as dubious.

Davis was a vocal proponent of the Federal Assault Weapons Ban. He later called the bill largely ineffective because of its wording, which does not ban guns by type or firing capacity, but rather by specific technical attributes.

Davis was locally known for his late night television commercials. Indianapolis Magazine voted them as the worst Indianapolis-based commercials in 1984 and 1985. He traditionally ended them with his slogan, "I don't want to make any money. I just love to sell guns, heh-heh-heh." Buddy Kalick's Buddy's Carpet used this slogan in his earliest commercials with "carpet" substituted for "guns."

Davis was interviewed by NPR's Michele Norris on All Things Considered to discuss the sunset of the Federal Assault Weapons Ban. He had previously been interviewed by Paula Zahn on CNN's Paula Zahn Now. He died at an Indianapolis hospital on February 4, 2016, aged 82.
