= Michael Hanlon =

British science writer (1964–2016)

- Born: 20 December 1964; Bristol, England
- Died: 9 February 2016 (aged 51)
- Occupation: Science Writer/Journalist
- Known for: Science articles in newspapers and magazines, and writing books

Michael Hanlon (20 December 1964 – 9 February 2016) was a British science writer and newspaper science editor.

== Early life ==
Hanlon was born in Bristol and grew up on the Dorset coast. He studied Earth Sciences at university in Dundee.

== Career ==
Hanlon was the Science page editor at the Daily Telegraph having previously been Science Editor at the Daily Mail, and author of articles for the Daily Express, the Independent and Irish News. He also contributed on a regular basis to several magazines, including the Spectator. He was often seen on television, or heard on the radio, as an expert in explaining science to the general public. The Guardian called Hanlon a "top science writer".

Hanlon turned heads, including that of Ed West, when he abandoned his skepticism about global warming. According to the Daily Telegraph, this followed a visit to the Greenland ice cap when he saw the extent of the melt for himself.

== Books ==
- The Worlds of Galileo: A Jovian Odyssey (2001), co-authored with Arthur C. Clarke.
- The Real Mars (2004)
- The Science of the Hitchhiker's Guide to the Galaxy (2006)
- 10 Questions Science Can't Answer (Yet!): A Guide to Science's Greatest Mysteries (2007)
- Eternity: Our Next Billion Years (Macmillan Science) (2008)
- In the Interests of Safety: The absurd rules that blight our lives and how we can change them (2014), co-authored with Tracey Brown

== Personal life ==
Hanlon was married to Elena Seymenliyska, also a journalist, who works for Aeon (digital magazine).

Hanlon died of an aortic dissection on 9 February 2016. He leaves behind a son, Zachary.

Media offices
Preceded by	Science Editor of the Daily Mail	Succeeded by Incumbent
