= James C. Russell =

American politician (1928–2016)

Member of the Missouri House of Representatives from the 1, 25, 58, and 75 district
- In office 1962–1988

Personal details
- Born: November 4, 1928 St. Louis, Missouri, U.S.
- Died: February 24, 2016 (aged 87)
- Party: Democratic
- Spouse: Delphie Mann (m. 1955)
- Children: Two children
- Education: University of Missouri
- Occupation: Restaurateur

Military service
- Branch/service: United States Marine Corps

James C. Russell Sr., known as Jay Russell (November 4, 1928 – February 24, 2016), was an American politician who served in the Missouri House of Representatives. Russell was born in St. Louis and attended the University of Missouri in Columbia. A veteran of the United States Marine Corps, he owned BJ's Bar and Restaurant in Florissant in St. Louis County.

On June 11, 1955, he wed the former Delphie Mann in Pine Lawn, also in St. Louis County. There are two surviving children, including James Russell Jr. He was elected to the Missouri House in 1962. At various times because of redistricting, he represented Districts 1, 25, 58, and 75. He served as a Democrat until 1988. Russell died on February 24, 2016, having been diagnosed with skin cancer six months prior.
