= John Lewis Mitchell =

Air Commodore & Pilot for Winston Churchill (1918–2016)

John Mitchell
- Born: 12 November 1918; South Croydon, UK
- Died: 5 February 2016 (aged 97)
- Military career
- Allegiance: UK

Air Commodore John Lewis Mitchell LVO DFC AFC (12 November 1918 – 5 February 2016) was a pilot who flew Winston Churchill around the world in his specially fitted aircraft, Ascalon.

Mitchell was born in South Croydon and educated at Bancroft's School.

During World War II Prime Minister Winston Churchill had flown in RAF and civil aircraft but as the war intensified it was decided that he would fly in special plane codenamed, Ascalon, after the lance with which St George killed the dragon.

== Personal life ==
He married Brenda Stroud in 1943 and they had two sons.
