= José Moës =

Belgian footballer (1923–2016)

Personal information
- Date of birth: 19 July 1923
- Date of death: 20 February 2016 (aged 92)
- Position: Forward

Senior career*
Years	Team	Apps	(Gls)
?–1948	Stade Waremmien		
1948–1958	RFC Liège		
1958–?	RFC Bressoux		

International career
1951–1954	Belgium	6	(4)
- * Club domestic league appearances and goals

José Moës (19 July 1923 – 20 February 2016) was a Belgian footballer who played as a forward for RFC Liège. He made six appearances for the Belgium national team from 1951 to 1954, scoring four goals.

== Career ==
Moës started his career with Stade Waremmien. He left the club in 1948 to join RFC Liège, where he scored 101 goals in 237 appearances and won the national championship twice, in 1951–52 and 1952–53. In 1958 he moved to RFC Bressoux.

Moës made his debut for the Belgium national team in a 8–1 defeat to Austria on 14 October 1951.

== Death ==
Moës died on 20 February 2016 in his home in Vaux-et-Borset, at the age of 92.
