= Iwo Zaniewski =

Polish artist

Iwo Zaniewski (b.1956) is a Polish painter, photographer, director and artistic director of PZL advertising agency. He graduated from the Academy of Fine Arts in Warsaw in 1981 and won the Grand Prix at the Joan Miró Foundation International Competition in Barcelona, Spain in 1984.

== Painting ==
Iwo Zaniewski works primarily with traditional oil painting and drawing. The artist’s works reflect a distinct sensitivity to the ordinary and celebrate moments and scenes of everyday life. His voluminous oeuvre can be divided into classical subject matter, namely: portraits and self-portraits, still life, interiors, and landscapes.

Despite numerous changes in the contemporary painting conventions concerning the portrayal of reality, the characteristic feature of Zaniewski’s paintings has remained essentially that of composition. As such, his works are not readily ascribed to trends in the history of contemporary art. His figurative oil paintings retain harmoniously combined colours and painstakingly structured composition—an arrangement of forms wherein any potential alteration breaks down a cohesive construction and leads to deterioration of harmony.

== Theory of visual harmony ==
In recent years, Iwo Zaniewski has developed his own theory of visual harmony, known as the "Harmony Algorithm." It suggests that a painting achieves a state of aesthetic perfection when each of its fragments differs from the others to the same, maximum degree. In such a system, no element dominates or disappears, and any noticeable change worsens the relationship of the whole and lowers the aesthetic appreciation of the work.

Zaniewski founded the organisation Composition Matters, whose aim is to conduct interdisciplinary research on the perception of composition as a key factor influencing the perception of beauty in art. In an interview for Al-Tiba9 Contemporary Art magazine, he emphasised that he collaborated with theoretical physicists, experimental psychologists and neuroscientists to develop the theory, and his goal was to create a universal model of harmony that could be applied regardless of the artistic style. The theory's assumptions are also described in detail on compositionmatters.org, where interactive examples and experiments are presented.

In 2018, he co-authored "Eye Movement Correlates of Expertise in Visual Arts", which was published in the journal Frontiers in Human Neuroscience. According to its authors, it was the first scientific paper in the field of neuroaesthetics to investigate the mechanism of compositional harmony and its perception.

== Advertising career ==
Zaniewski's first commercial projects were for the Spanish advertising agency Bassat, Ogilvy & Mather in Barcelona. Thereafter, his first Polish commercials were for ITI Agency. From 1992 to 1999 he was artistic director of the Grey Agency in Warsaw. He created advertising campaigns for brands such as Knorr, Frugo, Okocim, Radio Zet, Lucky Strike, and Malma. In 1999, along with Kot Przybora he founded the Przybora Zaniewski Ltd advertising agency (PLZ). PZL has created advertising campaigns for Frugo, Dębowe Mocne, Żubr, Redds, Orlen, Tetley, Olej Kujawski, Manuel, Simplus, and the longest-running Polish advertising campaign for mobile network operator Plus.

In 2012, Zaniewski and Kot Przybora won the inaugural AdMan competition, organised by the magazine Press, in recognition of their contribution to the development of Polish advertising. In 2013, Zaniewski was awarded the Golden Cross of Merit.

In May 2014, Zaniewski left the Publicis Group, of which PZL was a part. In November 2014, PZL became an independent creative advertising agency. Zaniewski subsequently led the agency together with Kot Przybora.

== Exhibitions ==
Zaniewski has exhibited since 1980. His most significant exhibitions and awards include:

- Wahl Gallery, Warsaw 1981;
- 1984 Grand Prix at the 23rd Joan Miró Foundation International Competition, Barcelona;
- Galeria Narodowa Zachęta (collective exhibition), Warsaw 1985;
- Art Basel, Basle 1985;
- Japan International Artists Society (collective exhibition) Tokyo 1985;
- SARP Gallery, Warsaw 1989;
- Inny Świat Gallery, Kraków, 1990;
- Major Retrospective Exhibition at the National Museum in Kraków (held at the Arsenal building), under the patronage of Waldemar Dąbrowski, Polish Minister for Art and Culture, 2005;
- 1st Place in the National Geographic photographic competition, Warsaw 2005;
- Today Art Museum, Beijing 2008;
- All Gallery, Beijing 2008;
- International Art Fair, Shanghai 2008;
- Wilson Art Center, Shanghai 2008;
- Levant Gallery, Shanghai 2008;
- Sunshine Museum, Beijing (inaugural collective exhibition), Beijing 2008;
- CANART - Institute of Contemporary Art (inaugural collective exhibition), Shanghai 2008.
