= François Fourquet =

French economist

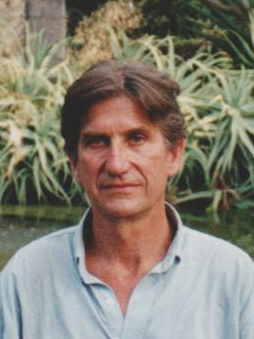
- Born: 1940
- Died: 17 February 2016 (aged 75–76)
- Occupation: Economist

François Fourquet (1940 – 17 February 2016) was a French economist, professor of economics at University of Paris VIII.

Fourquet studied at the Institut d'Études Politiques de Paris After an internship at La Borde clinic in 1965, he worked there as administrative secretary under Félix Guattari from 1966 to 1972. In 1972 he joined the Center for Institutional Study, Research, and Training (CERFI), and his first book The Historical Ideal appeared as issue 14 of the CERFI magazine, Recherches.

== Biography ==
He was administrative secretary of the Clinique de La Borde (1966-1972) and treasurer of the CERFI (Centre d'études, de recherche et de formation institutionnelles) created by Félix Guattari (1967-1974).

He taught at the University of Pau and the Adour Region, before being recruited in 1994 at the University of Paris 8.

His research focuses on the Political economy of Globalization, the relationship between economics and History, the informational theory of value and (European) service of Public interest. He is influenced by Marcel Mauss.

A study day devoted to the discussion of his theses was scheduled for Saturday March 20, 2010 at the University of Paris 8.

== Works ==
- L'ideal historique, 1974. Special issue (no. 14) of Recherches.
- (with Lion Murard) Les équipements du pouvoir: villes, territoires et équipements collectifs, UGE, 1976.
- Les Comptes de la puissance: histoire de la comptabilité nationale et du Plan, in Recherches, 1980.
- (with Lion Murard) Histoire de la psychiatrie de secteur In Recherches, 1980
- Richesse et puissance: une généalogie de la valeur, XVIe-XVIIIe siècle, 1989
- La naissance des villes nouvelles: anatomie d'une décision, 1961-1969, 2004
