= Giannis Kalaitzis =

Greek comics artist and costume designer (1945–2016)

- Born: November 11, 1945; Nikaia, Attica, Greece
- Died: February 12, 2016 (aged 70); Athens, Greece
- Known for: Tsinganiki Orchistra (1984)

Giannis Kalaitzis (Greek: Γιάννης Καλαϊτζής; November 11, 1945 – February 12, 2016) was a Greek cartoonist known for his editorial cartoons in various Greek daily newspapers.

== Early life ==
Kalaitzis was born and grew up in Kokkinia in Greater Athens, where his family owned a coffee shop. He was a member of Lambrakis Democratic Youth.

== Career ==
Kalaitzis was active for several decades and his works have been published in newspapers such as Avgi, Eleftherotypia, Efimerida ton Syntakton, and magazines such as Vavel, Anti, DIO, and Galera.

He also did the scenic and costume design for the 1977 film Happy Day directed by Pantelis Voulgaris.
