= David Duffield (sports commentator) =

David Duffield (20 May 1931 – 21 February 2016) was best known as a commentator on British Eurosport working mainly on the channel's professional cycling coverage for many years. In the 1950s, Duffield was an accomplished amateur cyclist who specialised on the tricycle, earning himself the trike 100 mile record and in 1956, the UK End-to-End record with a time of 3 days, 12 hours and 15 mins. He was a member of the Birmingham-based Beacon Roads Cycling Club.

Duffield was born in Wolverhampton to a nurse mother and architect father, in a family with four children. He started his working life in advertising, before being conscripted into the British Army, where he rose to the rank of sergeant, and was introduced to cycling by another soldier.

In parallel with his racing and commentating careers he also worked in the cycle industry for most of his life. He had started in the advertising department of Phillips Cycles before he was promoted to sales representative. He went on to become the marketing man who made the small wheeled Moulton bicycle a household name, combining his professional work with his cycling exploits when he set a record for riding between Cardiff and London on a Moulton, completing a distance of 162 miles in six hours and 42 minutes. He subsequently worked in several senior roles within TI–Raleigh, where he was involved in establishing the successful TI–Raleigh racing team, as well as for other British cycle manufacturers. He also worked for Halfords, where he supplied the 65 bicycles used for the nude photoshoot for the poster promoting Queen's 1978 single "Bicycle Race".

He spent almost every weekend commentating at races, at the start, the finish and sometimes from a car along the route. His was the voice at the successful "Skol" six-day races at Wembley in the 1970s, having made his debut as a commentator at the 1967 Skol Six when the regular announcer fell ill.

He died on 21 February 2016 as a result of a fall. He was survived by his wife Jackie and his brother Eddie.

== Style of commentary ==
Duffield's commentary style was unique. He had many passionate fans and many passionate detractors.

Duffield was well known for his amusing "Duffieldisms." - obscure and ironic phrases or sayings often sourced from his English Midlands upbringing. Some are archaic phrases that have otherwise gone out of fashion, some are simply unsuitable for family daytime viewing and others are just weird.
