= Mubeen Mughal =

Pakistani cricketer (1992–2016)

Personal information
- Full name: Mohammad Mubeen Mughal
- Born: 18 June 1992; Sialkot, Pakistan
- Died: 2 February 2016 (aged 23); Sialkot, Pakistan
- Source: Cricinfo, 22 March 2016

Mohammad Mubeen Mughal (18 June 1992 – 2 February 2016) was a Pakistani cricketer. He played six first-class and six List A matches for Sialkot between 2011 and 2012. He took five catches on debut, all Test players.

He died of hepatitis at the age of 23. The local cricket association set up a tournament in his memory.
