= Lorna Jorgenson Wendt =

Lorna Jorgenson Wendt (June 14, 1943 – February 4, 2016) was an American corporate wife whose challenge to the divorce laws in Connecticut set a precedent for the value of the economic worth of corporate spouses. She argued that a wife is a 50-50 partner in a marriage, and therefore worth half of the assets. She was eventually awarded about one-fifth of the estimated worth of the estate.

== Early life and marriage ==
Jorgenson Wendt was born on June 14, 1943, in Minot, North Dakota. Her father was a Lutheran minister, her mother a homemaker. The couple met in high school; both graduated from the University of Wisconsin, after which they married in 1965. Jorgenson Wendt worked as a music teacher until the birth of their first child in 1968.

== Divorce ==
In 1996, Gary C. Wendt, then CEO of the GE Capital Corporation, began divorce proceedings against his wife. Although Connecticut's divorce law allowed for equitable distribution, not community property as in some states, Jorgenson Wendt filed for half of her husband's $100 million wealth. Rather than the offered $8 million from her ex-husband, the court awarded Jorgenson Wendt $20 million. The ruling extended to 420 pages. Jorgenson Wendt appealed that ruling, wanting one half of the estate, but the original decision was upheld in 2000.

Jorgenson Wendt formed the Institute for Marriage Equality in 1998, which she ran until it closed in 2006. She lectured throughout the country on issue of the value of a wife's contribution to a marriage.

== Impact of the case ==
Jorgenson Wendt was on the cover of Forbes magazine with the headline "What's a Corporate Wife Worth?" She went on to become an advocate for prenuptial agreements.
