= José Artecona =

Puerto Rican sports shooter

Personal information
- Nationality: Puerto Rican
- Born: 9 August 1932 Havana, Cuba
- Died: 23 February 2016 (aged 83)

Sport
- Sport: Sports shooting

José Artecona (9 August 1932 – 23 February 2016) was a Cuban-born Puerto Rican sports shooter. He competed at the 1984 Summer Olympics and the 1996 Summer Olympics.
