= John Johnson (trainer) =

American athletic trainer (1917–2016)

John "Mr. J" Johnson (March 31, 1917 – February 28, 2016) was an American athletic trainer, formerly for the New York Giants of the National Football League (NFL).

He began working for the Giants in 1948, and retired in 2008, after the Giants won Super Bowl XLII. He worked on the sidelines for 874 regular season games and 34 post season games. In addition, he worked as an athletic trainer for Manhattan College.

Johnson was inducted into the Giants' Ring of Honor in 2015.

He died in New Jersey at the age of 98 in 2016.
