= Thomas Rea =

American dermatologist (1929–2016)

Thomas Herald Rea (1929 – February 7, 2016) was an American dermatologist known for his research into treatments for leprosy.

== Early life ==
Rea was born in 1929 in Three Rivers, Michigan. He graduated from Oberlin College in Ohio and the University of Michigan in Ann Arbor's medical school, where he also completed his dermatology residency.

== Career ==
Rea worked for the U.S. Army Medical Corps in Korea and in the dermatology department at New York University before moving to Los Angeles in 1970. From 1981 to 1996, he was the head of the dermatology division at University of Southern California.

== Work ==
Rea and his colleague Robert Modlin researched the role the immune system played in symptoms of leprosy, which led to the development of new treatments for the disease that rendered it non-contagious and allowed leprosy patients to live normal lives. Rea also supported the use of thalidomide to treat a complication of leprosy.

== Death ==
Rea died on February 7, 2016, at his home in the San Gabriel Mountains, after a battle with cancer.
