= Sidney Grande =

American football coach

Biographical details
- Born: May 31, 1927; Jamestown, North Dakota, U.S.
- Died: February 1, 2016 (aged 88); Yuma, Arizona, U.S.

Coaching career (HC unless noted)
- 1957–1963: Jamestown

Head coaching record
- Overall: 23–31–1

Accomplishments and honors

Championships
- 1 NDIC (1957)

Sidney R. Grande (May 31, 1927 – February 1, 2016) an American football coach. He was the head football at Jamestown College—now known as the University of Jamestown—in Jamestown, North Dakota, serving for seven seasons, from 1957 to 1963, and compiling a record of 23–31–1.

== Head coaching record ==
Year	Team	Overall	Conference	Standing	Bowl/playoffs
Jamestown Jimmies (North Dakota Intercollegiate Conference / North Dakota College Athletic Conference) (1957–1963)
1957	Jamestown	7–0	6–0	1st	
1958	Jamestown	5–3	5–2	3rd	
1959	Jamestown	2–5–1	1–4–1	6th	
1960	Jamestown	3–5	3–3	T–4th	
1961	Jamestown	4–4	3–3	T–4th	
1962	Jamestown	1–7	1–5	6th	
1963	Jamestown	1–7	1–5	6th	
Jamestown:		23–31–1	20–22–1		
Total:		23–31–1			
National championship Conference title Conference division title or championship game berth
