= Robert Beiner =

American television sports producer and director

Robert Beiner (born December 3, 1950, New York City, died February 2, 2016, Great Neck, New York) was an American television sports producer and director, producing thousands of shows over a career which spanned over four decades, with a specialty in television championship boxing.

== Television career ==
A graduate of Brooklyn College with a graduate degree from The New School, Beiner rose to prominence with ABC Sports, where he produced Monday Night Football, The Olympic Games, and telecasts for Howard Cosell on ABC Sports. From 1982 to 1997, Beiner produced Friday Night Fights on the USA Network. From 1998 till his death, Beiner produced ESPN Friday Night Fights. He was also the owner and president of his own production company Our Vision, which he founded in 1995. From 2000 to 2002, Beiner simultaneously produced and directed the original BattleBots series on Comedy Central. Beiner also produced for Bellator on the Spike Mixed Martial Arts circuit, and Al Haymon's Premiere Boxing champions telecasts on the NBC Sports Network. Since 2011, Beiner was vice president and Senior Coordinating Producer for Bellator MMA.

Beiner died on February 2, 2016.
