= Mutsuo Tahara =

Japanese judge

Member of the Supreme Court of Japan

Mutsuo Tahara (田原 睦夫, Tahara Mutsuo; April 23, 1943 – February 19, 2016) was a Japanese judge who was a member of the Supreme Court of Japan.

He is notable in Japan for his contributions to bankruptcy law.
