= Michael Jaharis =

American businessman and philanthropist (1928–2016)

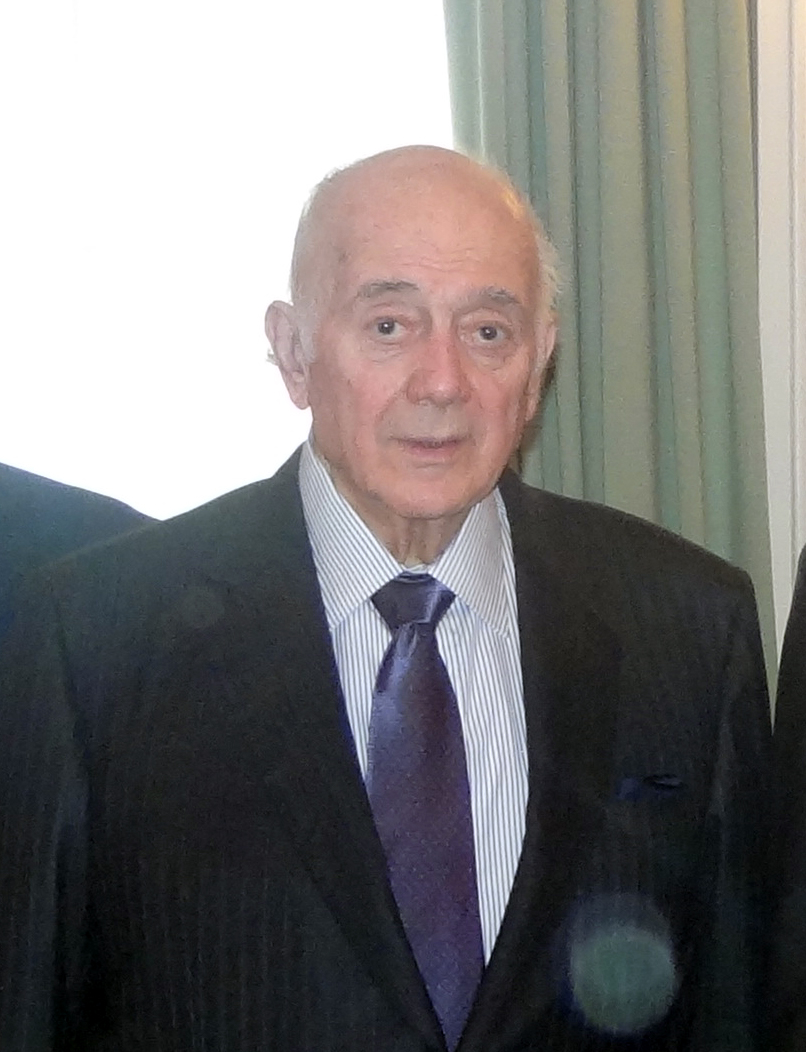
- Jaharis in 2012
- Born: July 16, 1928; Evanston, Illinois, US
- Died: February 17, 2016 (aged 87); New York City, US
- Education: Carroll University; DePaul University College of Law
- Occupations: Lawyer, businessman
- Spouse: Mary Jaharis
- Children: 2

Michael Jaharis (July 16, 1928 – February 17, 2016) was an American lawyer, businessman and philanthropist. He was the founder of Kos Pharmaceuticals and Vatera Healthcare Partners LLC, and co-founder of Arisaph Pharmaceuticals.

== Biography ==
Jaharis was born in Evanston, Illinois on July 16, 1928. He graduated from Carroll University and received a J.D. from DePaul University College of Law.

From 1961 to 1972, he worked for Miles Laboratories. In 1972, he became President and CEO of Key Pharmaceuticals, which was essentially an insolvent company known for cold and cough remedies. Under his leadership, the company developed sustained-release Theo-Dur (theophylline), which became the nation's best-selling asthma remedy at the time, and cardiovascular drug Nitro-Dur. Key Pharmaceuticals was sold to Schering-Plough Corporation in 1986. In 1988, he founded Kos Pharmaceuticals, Inc. The company introduced the cholesterol-battling drug Niaspan, which raises HDL levels. Kos Pharmaceuticals was sold to Abbott Labs in 2006 for $4.2 billion.

In 2007, Jaharis co-founded Vatera Healthcare Partners LLC, a New York City-based investment group focused on taking active positions in healthcare companies that develop products for medical needs in a range of therapeutic areas including chronic obstructive pulmonary disease (Pearl Therapeutics), cardio metabolic diseases and cancer (Arisaph Pharmaceuticals), antibiotic resistant bacterial infections (Melinta Therapeutics), and celiac disease (ImmusanT).

He has made charitable contributions to the DePaul University College of Law, Columbia University Medical Center, Carroll University, the Weill Cornell Medical College of Cornell University, the Tufts University School of Medicine, the Metropolitan Museum of Art, the Art Institute of Chicago, and the Metropolitan Opera. He was the founder of FAITH: An Endowment for Orthodoxy and Hellenism. He also served as Trustee Emeritus of Tufts University and Chairman of the Board of Overseers for the School of Medicine of Tufts University; member of the Columbia University Medical Center Board of Visitors; member of the Board of Overseers of the Weill Cornell Medical College and Graduate School of Medical Sciences. He sat on the board of directors of the Onassis Public Benefit Foundation, and he was Vice Chairman of the Greek Orthodox Archdiocese of America. In 1986, Jaharis and wife Mary Jaharis founded the Jaharis Family Foundation, Inc. In 2013, the Foundation pledged $2 million to help relieve hunger and poverty in Greece during the country's fiscal crisis.

As of March 2015, he was the 847th richest person in the world, and the 297th richest in the United States, with an estimated wealth of US $2.2 billion.

Jaharis died February 17, 2016, in his home in New York City with his family by his side.
