= Michael Brick =

American journalist

Christopher Michael Brick (June 21, 1974 – February 8, 2016) was an American journalist and songwriter. He worked as a freelance writer and as a writer for The New York Times. Brick was working for the Houston Chronicle at the time of his death from cancer.

== Biography ==
Born in Cheverly, Maryland, Brick moved to Dallas as a teenager. He graduated from R. L. Turner High School in Carrollton and the University of Texas at Austin. Brick worked as a research assistant for Kurt Eichenwald on the book The Informant. "Pretty soon, not only was he doing everything exceptionally, but I began to recognize his writing skills, which I hadn't been paying attention to. By the time he was finished working with me, it became clear to me that on a lot of levels he was better than me," Eichenwald said.

Brick was on the staff of The New York Times from 2001 to 2008. He covered events including the Enron scandal and Hurricane Katrina with The New York Times. He became a freelance writer in 2008. In 2013 and 2014, he was an adviser for The Daily Texan, the student newspaper for which he had written when he attended UT Austin. He joined the Houston Chronicle in 2014, and published a column known as The Sporting Life.

Brick's 2012 book, Saving the School: The True Story of a Principal, a Teacher, a Coach, a Bunch of Kids, and a Year in the Crosshairs of Education Reform, told the story of the struggling Reagan High School in Austin, Texas. Brick followed several teachers, a number of students, and the principal of the school as he was writing the book. Patrick Welsh of The Washington Post said that the book "is a compelling, enlightening account of a school community rising to save itself."

Brick wrote music and played guitar and mandolin. In college, he formed a band known as Bottle of Smoke, and later in Brooklyn, he started another band in Brooklyn called The Music Grinders. He died of colon cancer in 2016. He was survived by his wife and three children.
