= Peter van de Merwe =

Dutch footballer

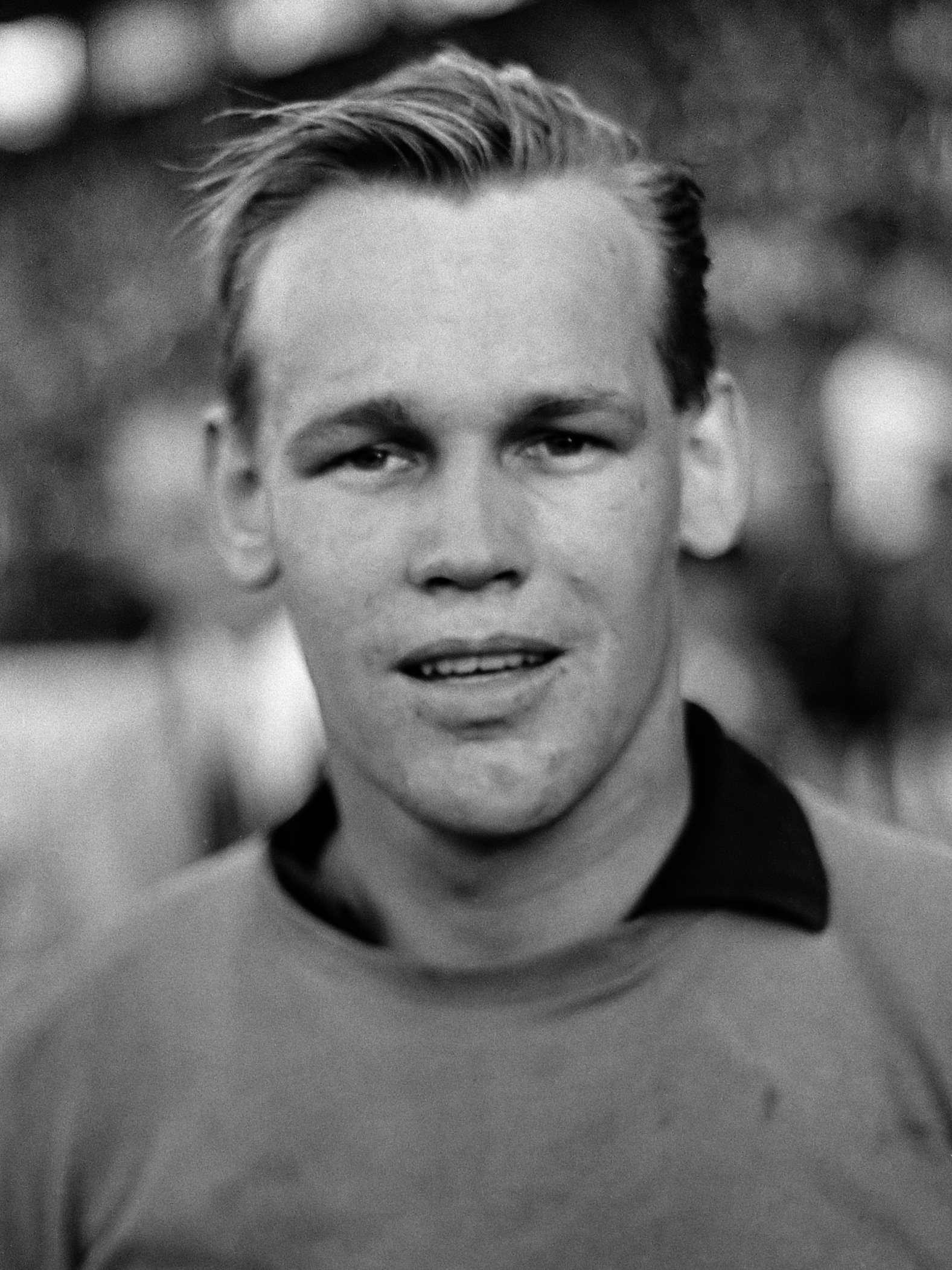
- Van de Merwe in 1967

Personal information
- Full name: Petrus van de Merwe
- Date of birth: 13 January 1942
- Place of birth: Breda, Netherlands
- Date of death: 24 February 2016 (aged 74)
- Place of death: Sint Willebrord, Netherlands
- Position: Goalkeeper

Senior career*
Years	Team	Apps	(Gls)
1959–1970	NAC	218	(0)

International career
1962	Netherlands	5	(0)
- * Club domestic league appearances and goals

Petrus (Peter) van de Merwe (13 January 1942 – 24 February 2016) was a Dutch footballer who played as a goalkeeper.

== Club career ==
Nicknamed the Black Panther of Breda, Van de Merwe played his entire career for hometown club NAC.

Van de Merwe played his final league game against AZ'67 in October 1970 and retired at 29 after persisting injury worries and totaling 257 matches for NAC. He was later diagnosed with rheumatics and spent time in a wheelchair.

== International career ==
He made his debut for the Netherlands in a May 1962 friendly match against Northern Ireland and has earned a total of 5 caps, scoring no goals. His final international was a November 1962 European Championship qualification match against Switzerland.

== Personal life and death ==
After retiring as a player, Van de Merwe moved to Sint Willebrord where he worked as a janitor at a school and a sports centre. He died of cancer in Sint Willebrord in February 2016.
