= Howard G. Swafford =

American politician

Member of the Tennessee House of Representatives from the 12th district
- In office 1973–1985

Personal details
- Born: October 11, 1919 Jasper, Tennessee
- Died: February 4, 2016 (aged 96) Jasper, Tennessee
- Occupation: Educator

Howard Graham Swafford (October 11, 1919 – February 4, 2016) was an American politician in the state of Tennessee. Swafford served in the Tennessee House of Representatives as a Republican from the 12th District from 1973 to 1985. A native of Jasper, Tennessee, he was a lawyer, member of the Tennessee Bar Association and alumnus of the University of Tennessee at Knoxville. He was also a veteran of World War II, serving as a Naval Aviator Pilot. He participated in the Battle of Iwo Jima and served on the USS South Dakota (BB-57).
