= Ivan M. Matheson =

American politician and farmer

Member of the Utah Senate from the 29th district
- In office 1977–1988

Personal details
- Born: November 9, 1926 Enoch, Utah, U.S.
- Died: February 21, 2016 (aged 89) Cedar City, Utah, U.S.
- Party: Republican
- Spouse(s): Etta Louise Warren (m. 1948–2010; her death)
- Profession: Dairy farmer

Ivan Mack Matheson (November 9, 1926 – February 21, 2016), was an American politician and farmer.

Matheson was elected to the Iron County Commission in 1962. He served four terms on that body.

Matheson served as a Republican member of the Utah State Senate from 1977 until 1989. He also served on the Iron County Commission. Matheson is an alumnus of Oregon State University and was a dairy farmer. He died on February 21, 2016, in Cedar City.

Matheson was a member of the Church of Jesus Christ of Latter-day Saints. He was the first bishop of the Enoch 2nd Ward. He later served with his wife as a missionary in the Florida Tallahassee Mission, was assigned to work with the church's addiction recovery program, and for several years was a temple worker in the St. George Temple.
