= Muhayadin Mohamed =

Somali politician

Muhayadin Mohamed (died February 15, 2016) was a Somali politician. He briefly served as Minister of Defence in 2008 during the Transitional Federal Government. Mohamed was an adviser to the Speaker of the Federal Parliament of Somalia, as of 2016.

Mohamed was killed in a car bombing, claimed by the terrorist group al Shabaab, in Mogadishu on February 15, 2016. A second person in Mohamed's car escaped the attack with minor injuries.
