= Rudolf Harmstorf =

German sailor (1922–2016)

Rudolf Harmstorf (25 December 1922 – 26 February 2016) was a German sailor who competed in the 1968 Summer Olympics. Harmstorf died in Hamburg on 26 February 2016, at the age of 93.
