= Criminal charge =

Formal accusation of wrongdoing in common law

A criminal charge is a formal allegation made by a governmental authority (usually a public prosecutor or the police) asserting that somebody has committed a crime. This can result in a conviction (guilty), acquittal (not guilty), or the charges being dropped. A charging document, which contains one or more criminal charges or counts, can take several forms, including:

- complaint
- information
- indictment
- citation
- traffic ticket

The charging document is what generally starts a criminal case in court. But the procedure by which somebody is charged with a crime and what happens when somebody has been charged varies from country to country and even sometimes within a country.

Before a person is found guilty of a crime, a criminal charge must be proven beyond a reasonable doubt.

== Punishment ==
There can be multiple punishments due to certain criminal charges. Minor criminal charges such as misdemeanors, tickets, and infractions have less harsh punishments. The judge usually sentences the person accused of committing the charges right after the hearing. The punishments generally include fines, suspension, probation, a small amount of jail time, or alcohol and drug classes. If the criminal charges are considered more serious like a felony, then there is a lengthier process for determining the punishment. Felonies include the most serious crimes such as murder and treason. In addition to the trial that decides innocence or guilt, there is a separate trial (after one is convicted) that determines the punishment(s) for the criminal charges committed.

== Rights when facing criminal charges ==
=== Europe ===
Article 6 of the European Convention on Human Rights protects the right to a fair trial.

=== India ===
As per Article 21 of the Constitution of India, "No person shall be deprived of his life or personal liberty except according to procedure established by law, nor shall any person be denied equality before the law or the equal protection of the laws within the territory of India". It also covers a just and fair trial without any arbitrary procedure, which confers that arrest should not only be legal but also justified. In this context, this article consists of the procedural and constitutional rights of the accused before and after the arrest in India. Except when exceptions are created, the accused person, unless and until provided otherwise, is considered innocent until proven guilty before the court of law.

=== United States ===
In the United States, people facing criminal charges in any situation enjoy certain rights under the Constitution. These rights include the right to remain silent, habeas corpus, the right to an attorney, and double jeopardy. It is important for someone who faces criminal charges to know their rights so they can take the proper action to exercise their rights. Among those rights are a criminal suspect's Miranda Rights which are read to a suspect prior to interrogation while in the custody of the police. If a suspect is not given a Miranda warning prior to interrogation it is possible that the suspect's statements will be excluded from evidence in a later criminal prosecution.

== Prosecution ==
In the United States, many people avoid criminal charges by staying out of the state where they committed the crime. A person facing state criminal charges is always prosecuted in the state where they committed the charges. A person may be able to get away with minor violations like a ticket, but they will not be able to hide from something like a misdemeanor or a felony. There are about sixty criminal charges that are considered more serious that people face every day. These charges can range from less serious actions such as shoplifting or vandalism to more serious crimes such as murder.

== Reckoning ==
In the United States, a person may be unaware that they have been charged. They can contact an attorney to ascertain if they have been charged with any crime. A police officer may also charge someone after investigating the possible crime committed.

== See also ==
- Conviction rate
- Crime clearance rate
