= Unsolved crime =

Unsolved crime is covered by several articles:

- Crime clearance rate
- Cold case
- List of unsolved deaths
