= International Network to Promote the Rule of Law =

The International Network to Promote the Rule of Law (INPROL) is a global, online community of practice, comprising 3,000+ rule of law practitioners from 120 countries and 300 organizations. INPROL works to assist specialists in the rule of law to stabilize war-torn societies.

INPROL is spearheaded by the U.S. Institute of Peace in partnership with the U.S. Department of State's Bureau for International Narcotics and Law Enforcement Affairs; the Center of Excellence for Stability Police Units (COESPU); the Organization for Security and Cooperation in Europe's Strategic Police Matters Unit; and the Center for Comparative Legal Studies and Post-Conflict Peacebuilding at the William & Mary School of Law.

== About ==
INPROL is a network of rule of law professionals dedicated to promoting justice, human security, and the rule of law worldwide. Every member of INPROL has access to the knowledge, experience, and ingenuity of all members. This incomparable fund of lessons learned, practical know-how, and cutting- edge innovation is available online 24/7. No matter where in the world a member might be, he or she has the tools with which to imagine, design, build, and implement rule of law reforms and innovations in conflict-affected and developing countries.

With 3,000+ members from 300+ organizations and 120+ countries, INPROL is the premier global network for professionals working on rule of law reform in conflict-affected and developing countries.

INPROL gives its members the tools with which to imagine, design, build, and implement rule of law reforms and innovations in transitional and developing societies. For its members, INPROL is a:

- Research team, conducting research in response to members’ specific needs and questions;
- Community of peers and social network, helping members sharpen skills and solve problems and linking members to individuals with the knowledge and contacts they need;
- Library, packed with resources from leading rule of law organizations and authors;
- Newspaper, spotlighting the latest developments in the rule of law field;
- Grapevine, listing new job opportunities and forthcoming events; and
- Bridge, bringing rule of law academics and practitioners closer together.

== Honorary Board ==
INPROL's Honorary Board members include:

- Paddy Ashdown - High Representative, Bosnia and Herzegovina (2002-2006)
- M. Cherif Bassiouni - President, International Human Rights Law Institute
- James Dobbins - Special Envoy for Somalia, Haiti, Bosnia, Kosovo and Afghanistan (1993-2002)
- Louise Frechette - Deputy Secretary General, United Nations (1998-2006)
- Yash Ghai - Chair, Constitution of Kenya Review Commission (2000-2004)
- Richard Goldstone - Justice, Constitutional Court of South Africa (1994-2003)
- Juan E. Mendez - Special Advisor on the Prevention of Genocide, United Nations (2004-2006)
- Richard Monk - Senior Police Advisor for the Organization of Security and Cooperation in Europe (2002-2006)
- John Norton Moore - Professor, University of Virginia School of Law; Director, Center for Oceans Law and Policy
- Satish Nambiar - Director, United Service Institute of India; United Nations Commander (1992-1993)
- William Nash - Commander, Multinational Division North, Bosnia and Herzegovina (1995-1997)
- Sandra Day O'Connor - Justice, United States Supreme Court (1981-2006)
- Søren Jessen-Petersen - Special Representative of the Secretary General, UN Mission in Kosovo (2004-2006)
- Dmitry Titov - UN Assistant Secretary General (2007-Present)
- William Walker - Head, Kosovo Verification Mission, Organization on Security and Cooperation in Europe (1998-1999)
- Prince Zeid Ra'ad Zeid Al-Hussein - Jordan Ambassador to the United States

== Experts Council ==
INPROL's Experts Councils are composed of leading rule of law scholars and practitioners.

=== Rule of Law Experts Council ===
- Alejandro Alvarez - Rule of Law, Justice and Security Advisor and Team Leader, Bureau for Crisis Prevention and Recovery, United Nations Development Programme
- Professor Per Berling - Principal Legal Advisor, Folke Bernadotte Academy
- Michael Hartmann - Chief, Criminal Justice Program (Afghanistan), UN Office on Drugs and Crime
- Isabel Hight - Prison System Adviser, Protection Division, International Committee of the Red Cross
- Gary Hill - Training Chair, International Corrections and Prisons Association
- Shelley Inglis - Policy Advisor/Team Leader, Rule of Law: Access to Justice and Security, Bureau for Development Policy, United Nations Development Programme
- Deborah Isser - Senior Counsel, World Bank
- Dr. Rachel Kleinfeld - Co-founder, Truman National Security Project
- Judge Agniezska Klonwieczka-Milart - Supreme Court Chamber, Extraordinary Chambers, Cambodia
- Bruce “Ossie” Oswald - Senior Lecturer, University of Melbourne Law School and Legal Officer, Australian Army (Reserves)
- Laure-Hélène Piron - United Kingdom, Department for International Development
- Dr. Richard Sannerholm - Researcher, Folke Bernadotte Academy
- Professor William Schabas, O.C. - Director, Irish Centre for Human Rights
- Dr. Niaz Shah - Lecturer, University of Hull, United Kingdom
- Dr. Mark Shaw - Director of Communities, Crime and Conflict at STATT Consulting, Hong Kong
- Andrew Solomon - USAID Democracy Fellow (Transitional Justice Advisor)
- Adam Stapleton - Governance and Justice Group
- Sheelagh Stewart - Director Governance and Rule of Law, BCPR, UNDP
- Professor Brian Tamanaha - Washington University School of Law
- Professor Veronica Taylor - Director, School of Regulation, Justice and Diplomacy, Australian National University
- Professor Christie Warren - Director, Comparative Legal Studies and Post-Conflict Justice Program, William & Mary Law School
- Paul Williams - Professor of Law and International Relations, American University

=== Police Experts Council ===
- Professor Bruce Baker - Director, African Studies Centre, Coventry University, United Kingdom
- Steve Bennett - Director, Kosovo Police Service School, UN Mission in Kosovo (1999-2006)
- General Vincenzo Coppola - General, Italian Carabinieri
- Nick Dove - Former Head of UK Metropolitan Police Intelligence Bureau and Head of the Organised Crime Investigation Teams (EU mission in Kosovo)
- William Durch - Senior Associate, Future of Peace Operations
- Stefan Feller - Police Commissioner, European Police Mission to Bosnia & Herzegovina (2008-present); former Head, Police Unit, European Union (2004-2008)
- Lynn Holland - Strategic Workforce Director, PAE
- Michael Jorsback - Police Adviser and Head of Police Division, United Nations Department of Peacekeeping Operations (2001-2002)
- Tony Murney - Australian Federal Police, International Deployment Group
- J. O'Neil G. Pouliot, Royal Canadian Mounted Police (ret.)
- William O’Neill - Program Director, Conflict Prevention and Peace Forum
- Dr. Eric Scheye - Police Consultant
- Colonel Giovanni Truglio - Commander, European Gendarmerie Force Permanent Headquarters
- Stephen White - Head, EUJST LEX Mission for Iraq, European Union

== Staff ==
- Lelia Mooney - Director
- Lillian Dang - Rule of Law Facilitator
- Nick Dove - Police Facilitator
- Kristina Simion - Rule of Law Research Facilitator
- Chelsea Dreher - Program Assistant

== Cooperating organizations ==
- Folke Bernadotte Academy
- International Association for Court Administration (IACA)
- International Association of Chiefs of Police (IACP)
- International Bar Association (IBA)
- International Corrections and Prisons Association (ICPA)
- International Security Sector Advisory Team at the Geneva Centre for the Democratic Control of Armed Forces (ISSAT)
- United Nations Office on Drugs and Crime (UNODC)
- The Worldwide Association of Women Forensic Experts] (WAWFE)
- The International Institute for Law and Human Rights (IILHR)
- The International Association of Women Police (IAWP)

== See also ==
- ONU Law Rule of Law LL.M. Program
