= Center of Excellence for Stability Police Units =

Training centre and doctrinal hub

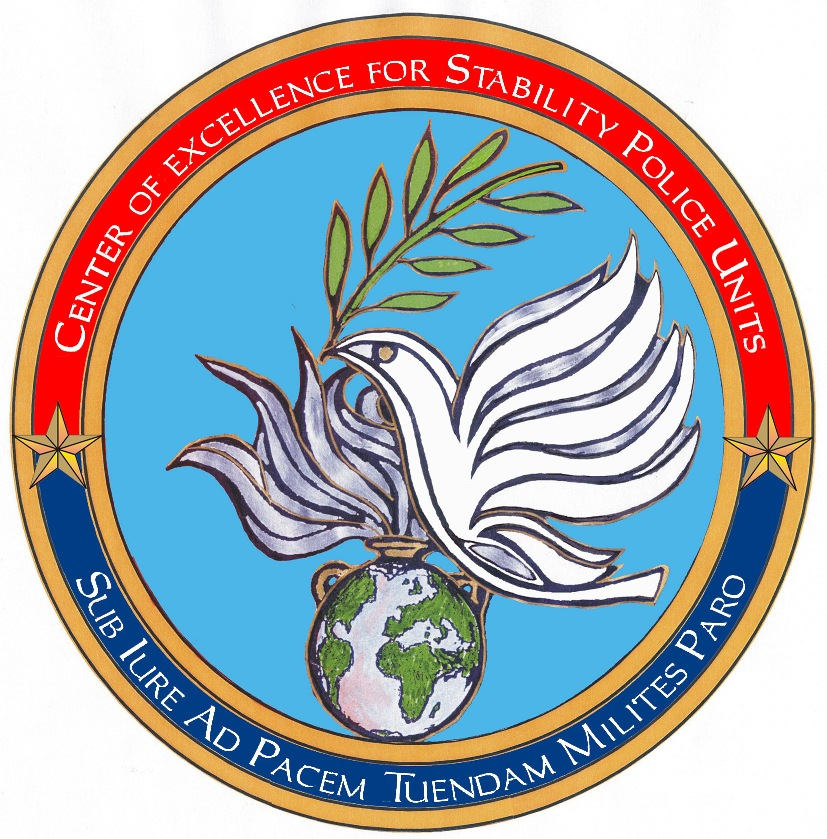
Logo CoESPU

The Center of Excellence for Stability Police Units is a training center and a doctrinal hub created by the Italian government on 1 March 2005, in accordance with the G8 Action Plan “Expanding Global Capability for Peace Support Operations” (PSOs). This initiative is based on the international expertise developed by the Carabinieri, having served in several peace-keeping missions in the last three decades.

== Targets ==
The CoESPU targets are:

- to operate training programs, including “train the trainer” courses and “Mobile Assistance Teams” (MATs)
- to promote interoperability principles, also providing interoperability training with the military forces and other components;
- to develop common doctrine and operational procedures;
- to be active part of the doctrinal network worldwide, interacting with International Organizations, academic institutes and research centers in the relevant areas

The Center is open to all those countries, particularly the African ones, interested in establishing their own Stability Police Units (SPUs), and employ those units in PSOs under the UN or other international organizations.

== Doctrinal Hub ==
Working as a “doctrinal hub”, the aim of the Center is to develop doctrine and common operational procedures for the employment of Stability Police Units in PSOs. Multinational linkages have been established with the most active institution in the peacekeeping area, such as the United States Institute of Peace (USIP), the Pearson Peacekeeping Centre, the Defense Institute for International Legal Studies, and the US Peacekeeping Support Operation Institute.

Moreover, the Center is the “facilitator” of the Stability Police Units area in the newly created internet portal “INPROL” (International Network to Promote the Rule of Law).

International seminars and workshops have been organized to spread and share the acquired knowledge with other bodies, first of all with the UN Department of Peacekeeping Operations. Two “UN Formed Police Units Command Development seminars”, sponsored by DPKO have been hosted at CoESPU, with the participation of UN Police Commissioners, FPU Commanders, FPU Coordinators from several UN Missions, along with members of NATO, EU, Organization for Security and Co-operation in Europe, United States Institute of Peace (USIP) and other organizations.

== Training center ==
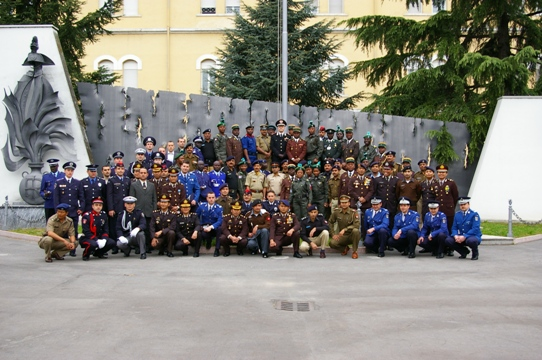
Course's snapshot

The Center offers two different levels of courses, one for senior officers and one for middle-ranked personnel. The main purpose is to prepare the attendees to establish Stability Police Units once back in their home countries.

- high level/staff officers

Participants: 40 Senior Officers (Major - Colonel/or equivalent civilian) Duration: 5 weeks; Frequency: 4 per year.

- Middle management

Participants: 100 Junior Officers/non-commissioned officers (platoon/squad leaders, Staff Sergeants/or civilian equivalent) Duration: 7 weeks Frequency: 5 per year. All the participants should have good police skills.

The following are the main topics of the courses:

- International and Humanitarian Law
- Peace Support Operations
- SPU planning and organization
- Rules of Engagement
- Force Protection
- SPU tactical employment
- Operational planning and procedures
- Police techniques in hostile environment

Starting in 2016, together with the OSCE, nine simulation exercises to foster interdisciplinary and international cooperation in the field of human trafficking and victim support have been held. 40 participants from six countries took part in the 2021 edition. The project is financed by Italy.

== Where ==
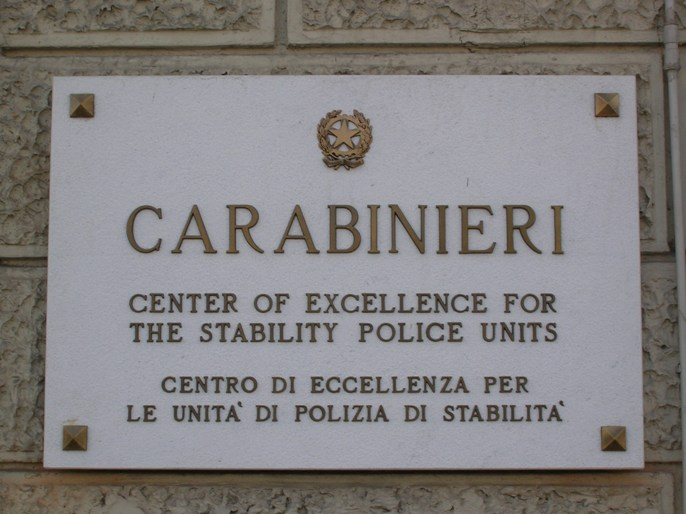
CoESPU's plate

The “Chinotto” compound, located in Vicenza, Italy, approx. 70 km (43 mi) from Venice.

The facilities, recently refurbished, include:

- board and lodging for 300 people;
- teaching rooms with hi-tech equipment;
- multimedia and internet rooms;
- an indoor shooting range;
- a gym;
- external training areas;
- a library;
- general services (barber, laundry, ATM, etc.)

== Participants ==
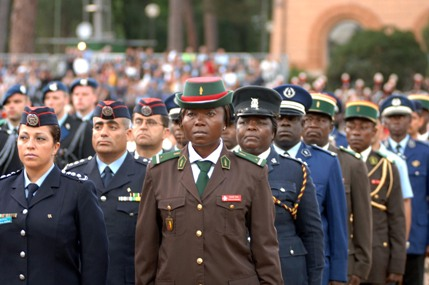
Flag-raising ceremony

Have agreed to the project, and have been sending their personnel to train, the following governments:

- Benin
- Bangladesh
- Burkina Faso
- Cameroon
- Chile
- Egypt
- Gabon
- India
- Indonesia
- Jordan
- Kenya
- Mali
- Morocco
- Nepal
- Nigeria
- Pakistan
- Romania
- Senegal
- Serbia
- South Africa
- Ukraine

== Contributions ==
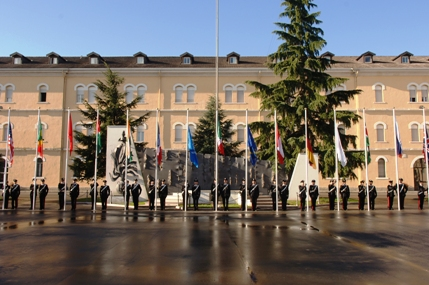

Besides United States and Italy, give their contribution at "CoESPU" project, sending highly qualified staff instructors the following countries:

- Cameroon
- France
- Nigeria
- Russia
- Senegal
- South Africa
