= Unsolved murder =

Unsolved murder is covered by several articles:

- Clearance rate
- Cold case
- List of unsolved deaths
