= Right to an effective remedy =

Right of a person whose human rights have been violated to legal remedy

The right to an effective remedy is the right of a person whose human rights have been violated to legal remedy. Such a remedy must be accessible, binding, capable of bringing perpetrators to justice, provide appropriate reparations, and prevent further violations of the person's rights. The right to an effective remedy guarantees the individual the ability to seek remedy from the state directly rather than through an international process. It is a practical means of protecting human rights on the state level and requires the state to not just only protect human rights de jure but also in practice for individual cases. The right to an effective remedy is commonly recognized as a human right in international human rights instruments.

The right to an effective remedy is expressed in Article 8 of the Universal Declaration of Human Rights, Article 2 of the International Covenant on Civil and Political Rights, Article 13 of the European Convention on Human Rights, and Article 47 of the European Union Charter on Fundamental Rights.

== Definition ==
An effective remedy refers to a process through which individuals can challenge violations of their rights and obtain a meaningful outcome. This includes both procedural guarantees (such as fair hearings, due process, and access to courts) and substantive outcomes (such as compensation or cessation of the violation).

The concept requires not only the availability of mechanisms but also that those mechanisms lead to practical and enforceable results

== International Legal Basis ==
=== Universal Instruments ===
The right is affirmed in several major United Nations human rights treaties, including:

- Universal Declaration of Human Rights (Article 8) – affirms the right to an effective remedy before competent courts.
- International Covenant on Civil and Political Rights (Article 2(3)) – requires states to provide accessible and enforceable remedies for rights violations.
- Convention Against Torture (Article 14) – guarantees redress and compensation for victims of torture.
- International Convention on the Elimination of Racial Discrimination (Article 6) – requires states to guarantee effective protection and remedies.
- Convention on the Rights of the Child (Articles 4 & 39) – establishes obligations to ensure legal remedies and rehabilitation.

UN treaty bodies consistently interpret these provisions as requiring states to establish judicial, administrative, and legislative mechanisms capable of providing real relief.

== Regional Human Rights Systems ==
=== European System ===
1. The European Convention on Human Rights (Article 13) guarantees the right to an effective remedy before a national authority.
2. The European Court of Human Rights (ECtHR) has developed extensive case law defining effective remedies as those that are practical, accessible, and capable of preventing or correcting violations.

=== Inter-American System ===
1. The American Convention on Human Rights (Article 25) protects judicial guarantees and effective recourse
2. The Inter-American Court of Human Rights (IACtHR) has emphasized the need for remedies that are not “illusory” and has developed detailed standards on reparations

==== African System ====
1. The African Charter on Human and Peoples’ Rights (Articles 7 and 26) protects the right to appeal and fair trial guarantees
2. The African Court on Human and Peoples’ Rights and the African Commission interpret these provisions to require accessible and timely remedies at national level

== Components of an Effective Remedy ==
1. Accessibility: Victims must be able to bring claims without discrimination, excessive costs, or procedural barriers.
2. Promptness: Remedies must be available within a reasonable time, particularly for violations that are ongoing or cause irreparable harm.
3. Competence and Independence: Authorities responsible for providing remedies must be impartial, independent, and empowered to issue legally binding decisions.
4. Reparations: Reparations may include: Restitution, Compensation, Rehabilitation, Satisfaction, Guarantees of non-repitations.
5. Adequacy and Enforceability: The remedy must have the power to stop the violation, provide redress, or ensure reparation. Decisions should be implemented effectively.

== Asylum seekers ==
The right to an effective remedy has been invoked in cases of asylum seekers in which the right has been held to prevent a state from deporting an asylum seeker before adjudicating the seeker's application for asylum, and that upon rejection of an asylum claim, the claimant must have a practical ability to appeal by being granted sufficient time and access to legal representation. Courts have not generally found that the state needs to provide a lawyer, even when an asylum seeker cannot afford one, provided that a lawyer is not necessary to access an effective remedy. Courts have found that an excessively formal process may violate the right to an effective remedy, especially when a lawyer is not provided.

== Council of Europe and European Union ==
Article 13 of the European Convention on Human Rights, to which member states of the Council of Europe are parties, provides:

Everyone whose rights and freedoms as set forth in this Convention are violated shall have an effective remedy before a national authority notwithstanding that the violation has been committed by persons acting in an official capacity.

A violation of article 13 can only be found in relation to some substantive right, but it is nonetheless a freestanding right that can be violated without any other right being violated. For example, in Koureas and others v Greece (2018), the European Court of Human Rights found no violation of any substantive rights, but a violation of Article 13 in respect of the means available to the complainants to address possible violations of Article 3 (right not to be subjected to inhuman or degrading treatment or punishment, in this case relating to conditions of imprisonment).

Article 6(3) of the Treaty on the Functioning of the European Union provides that rights under the Convention "shall constitute general principles of the Union's law". The Court of Justice of the European Union has interpreted this to mean that Article 13 applies beyond human rights to all rights provided for by EU law that are enforced in the courts of member states of the European Union.

== Torture ==
The United Nations Human Rights Committee has stated that in cases of torture, the right to an effective remedy requires states to investigate allegations of torture, prosecute perpetrators, provide compensation to victims, and prevent similar violations from occurring again. The principle of the right to an effective remedy is expressed in article 14 of the United Nations Convention against Torture.

== See also ==
- Clearance rate
- Conviction rate
- Error of impunity
- Impartiality
- Justice delayed is justice denied
  - Government failure
  - Obstructionism
- Right to a fair trial
- Statute of limitations
- Victims' rights
