= Jerome Skolnick =

American criminologist (1931–2024)

Jerome Herbert Skolnick (March 21, 1931 – February 22, 2024) was an American professor at Yale University, University of California, Berkeley, New York University and a former president of the American Society of Criminology. He joined the University of California, Berkeley in 1962. Skolnick had a Ph.D. in sociology from Yale University. In the 1950s he was appointed a Law professor at Yale, one of the youngest to ever hold that position.

== Clearance rates ==
Jerome Skolnick found that focusing on clearance rates creates an incentive for police to focus on boosting clearance rates, rather than on investigating crimes impartially. This is a comparable argument to that regarding standardized testing, and "teaching to the test". Skolnick noted one incident where police coerced a man to confess to over 400 burglaries so that they could have a high clearance rate.

== Awards ==
His awards include Carnegie, Guggenheim and National Science Foundation fellowships as well as prizes for distinguished scholarship from the American Society of Criminology, the Academy of Criminal Justice Sciences and the Western Society of Criminology. Jerry received widespread recognition in the United States and abroad throughout his long career.

== Death ==
Skolnick died on February 22, 2024, in New York City, New York, at the age of 92.

== Quotes ==
- "The law often, but not always, supports police deception."
- "Courtroom lying is justified within the police culture by the same sort of necessity rationale that courts have permitted police to employ at the investigative stage: The end justifies the means."

== Writings by Jerome Skolnick ==
Most of his writings deal with criminal justice.

- Skolnick, J. H. (1966). Justice without trial: law enforcement in democratic society. New York: Wiley. ISBN 978-0-471-79541-4. OCLC: 1175611.
- Skolnick, J. H.; E. Currie (1970). Crisis in American Institutions. Boston: Little, Brown. OCLC: 76362.
- Skolnick, J. H. (1978). House of cards: the legalization and control of casino gambling. Boston: Little, Brown. ISBN 0-316-79699-9. OCLC: 4004124.
- Skolnick, J.H.; Kaplan J. (1982). Criminal Justice; a Casebook. Mineola, N.Y.: Foundation Press. ISBN 0-88277-053-5. OCLC: 7977551.
- Skolnick, J. H.; Bayley, D. H. (1986). new blue line: police innovation in six American cities. New York: Free Press. ISBN 0-02-929310-3. OCLC: 12840114.
- Skolnick, J. H.; J. J. Fyfe (1993). Above the Law: Police and the Excessive Use of Force. New York: Free Press. ISBN 0-02-929312-X. OCLC: 27011930.

== Personal life ==
While attending Yale Law School, Jerome married Arlene Silberstein in New Haven, Connecticut. Both Jerome and Arlene were Reform Jewish. They had two sons who were born in Berkeley, Alex Skolnick, lead guitarist for the thrash metal band Testament and founder of the jazz band Alex Skolnick trio, and Michael Skolnick.
