= Clearance rate =

Clearance rate may refer to:

- Crime clearance rate, the ratio of crimes that are solved
- Clearance (pharmacology), the speed at which drugs are removed by the organism over time
