= Rule of law =

Political situation in which everyone is subject to the law

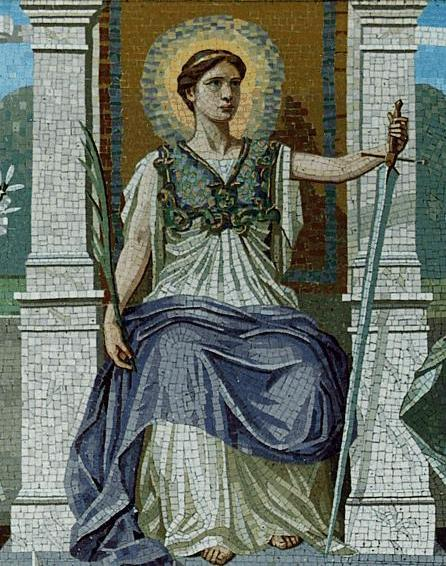
A mosaic representing both the judicial and legislative aspects of law. The woman on the throne holds a sword to chastise the guilty and a palm branch to reward the meritorious. Glory surrounds her head and the aegis of Minerva signifies the armor of righteousness and wisdom.

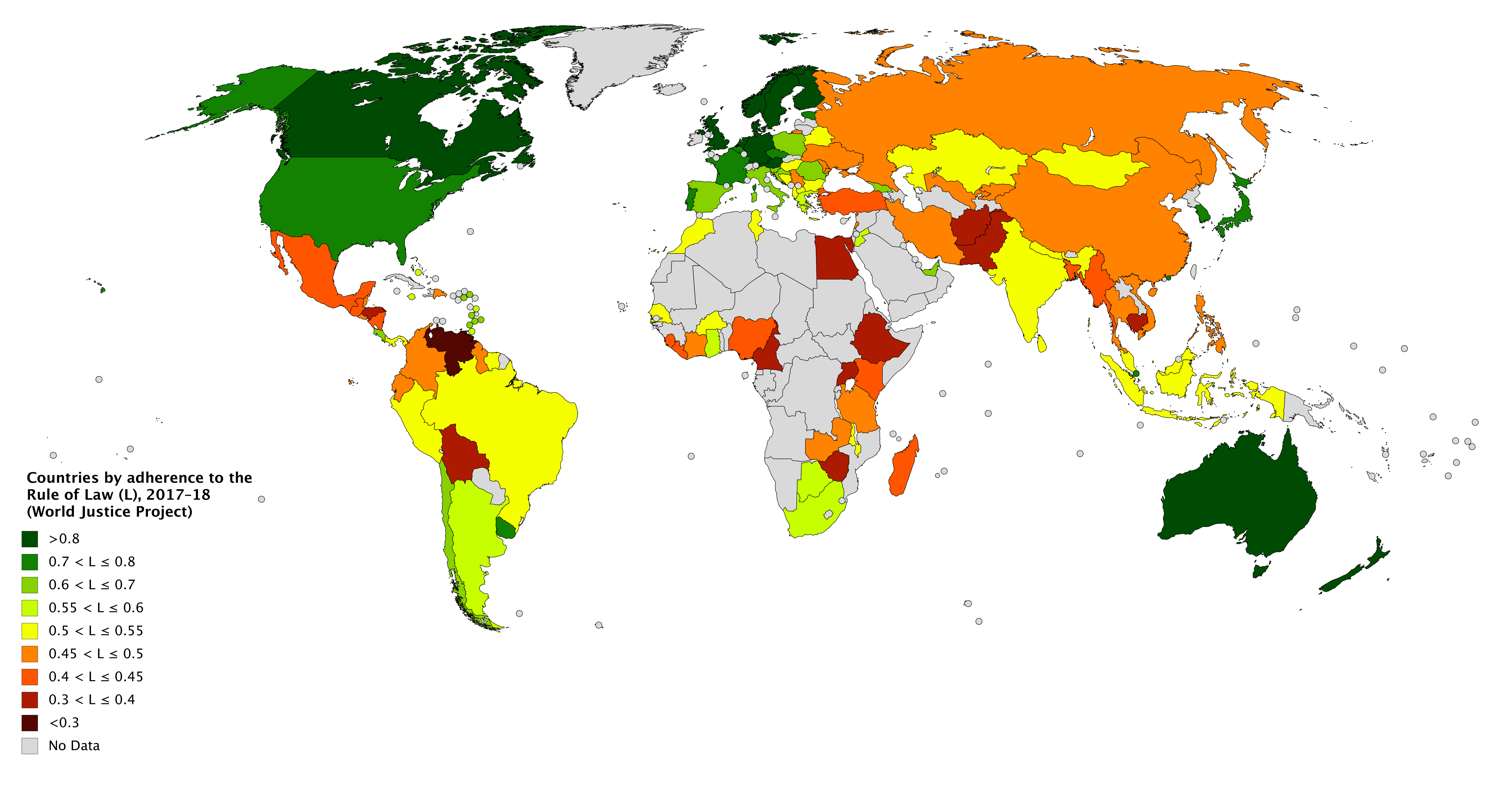
Countries by adherence to the Rule of Law (2017–18)

The rule of law is a political and legal principle that generally entails and ensures that the law is clear, consistent and open; individuals and groups have access to justice (such as fair, independent judiciaries); and that government institutions (such as the executive, legislature and judiciary) are subject to the law. It entails that all people and institutions within a political body are subject to the same law. This concept is sometimes stated simply as "no one is above the law" or "all are equal before the law". According to Encyclopædia Britannica, it is "the mechanism, process, institution, practice, or norm that supports the equality of all citizens before the law, secures a nonarbitrary form of government, and more generally prevents the arbitrary use of power."

Legal scholars have expanded the basic rule of law concept to encompass, first and foremost, a requirement that laws apply equally to everyone. "Formalists" add that the laws must be stable, accessible and clear. More recently, "substantivists" expand the concept to include rights, such as human rights, and compliance with international law.

The phrase dates to 16th-century Britain. In the next century, Scottish theologian Samuel Rutherford used it to argue against the divine right of kings. John Locke wrote that freedom in society means being subject only to laws written by a legislature that apply to everyone, with a person being otherwise free from both governmental and private restrictions on liberty. The phrase "rule of law" was further popularized in the 19th century by British jurist A. V. Dicey. However, the principle, if not the phrase itself, was recognized by ancient thinkers. Aristotle wrote: "It is more proper that law should govern than any one of the citizens."

The term rule of law is closely related to constitutionalism and Rechtsstaat. It refers to a political situation, not a specific legal rule. The opposite is the rule of man, where one person or group rules arbitrarily.

== History ==
Although credit for popularizing the expression "the rule of law" in modern times is usually given to A. V. Dicey, development of the legal concept can be traced through history to many ancient civilizations, including ancient Greece, Mesopotamia, India, and Rome.

=== Early history (to 15th century) ===
==== Ancient India ====
The earliest conception of rule of law can be traced back to the Indian epics Ramayana and Mahabharata - the earliest versions of which date around to 8th or 9th centuries BC. The Mahabharata deals with the concepts of Dharma (used to mean law and duty interchangeably), Rajdharma (duty of the king) and Dharmaraja. It states in one of its slokas that,"The people should execute a king who does not protect them, but deprives them of their property and assets and who takes no advice or guidance from any one. Such a king is not a king but misfortune."

Other sources for the philosophy of rule of law can be traced to the Upanishads which state that, "The law is the king of the kings. No one is higher than the law. Not even the king." Other commentaries include Kautilya's Arthashastra (4th-century BC), Manusmriti (dated to the 1st to 3rd century CE), Yajnavalkya-Smriti (dated between the 3rd and 5th century CE), Brihaspati Smriti (dated between 15 CE and 16 CE).

==== Ancient Greece ====
Several scholars have also traced the concept of the rule of law back to 4th-century BC Athens, seeing it either as the dominant value of the Athenian democracy, or as one held in conjunction with the concept of popular sovereignty. However, these arguments have been challenged and the present consensus is that upholding an abstract concept of the rule of law was not "the predominant consideration" of the Athenian legal system. Aristotle, in his Politics, wrote: "It is more proper that law should govern than any one of the citizens: upon the same principle, if it is advantageous to place the supreme power in some particular persons, they should be appointed to be only guardians, and the servants of the laws."

The idea of the rule of law can be regarded as a modern iteration of the ideas of ancient Greek philosophers, who argued that the best form of government was rule by the best men. Plato advocated a benevolent monarchy ruled by an idealized philosopher king, who was above the law. Plato nevertheless hoped that the best men would be good at respecting established laws, explaining that "Where the law is subject to some other authority and has none of its own, the collapse of the state, in my view, is not far off; but if law is the master of the government and the government is its slave, then the situation is full of promise and men enjoy all the blessings that the gods shower on a state." Similarly, Aristotle flatly opposed letting the highest officials wield power beyond guarding and serving the laws. In other words, Aristotle advocated the rule of law:

It is more proper that law should govern than any one of the citizens: upon the same principle, if it is advantageous to place the supreme power in some particular persons, they should be appointed to be only guardians, and the servants of the laws.

The Roman statesman Cicero is often cited as saying, roughly: "We are all servants of the laws in order to be free." During the Roman Republic, controversial magistrates might be put on trial when their terms of office expired. Under the Roman Empire, the sovereign was personally immune (legibus solutus), but those with grievances could sue the treasury.

==== China ====
In China, members of the school of legalism during the 3rd century BCE argued for using law as a tool of governance, but they promoted "rule by law" as opposed to "rule of law," meaning that they placed the aristocrats and emperor above the law. In contrast, the Huang–Lao school of Daoism rejected legal positivism in favor of a natural law that even the ruler would be subject to.

The ancient concept of rule of law can be distinguished from rule by law, according to political science professor Li Shuguang: "The difference ... is that, under the rule of law, the law is preeminent and can serve as a check against the abuse of power. Under rule by law, the law is a mere tool for a government, that suppresses in a legalistic fashion."

==== England ====
Alfred the Great, Anglo-Saxon king in the 9th century, reformed the law of his kingdom and assembled a law code (the Doom Book) which he grounded on biblical commandments. He held that the same law had to be applied to all persons, whether rich or poor, friends or enemies. This was likely inspired by Leviticus 19:15: "You shall do no iniquity in judgment. You shall not favor the wretched and you shall not defer to the rich. In righteousness you are to judge your fellow."

In 1215, Archbishop Stephen Langton gathered the Barons in England and restricted the powers of King John and future sovereigns and magistrates under the rule of law, preserving ancient liberties by Magna Carta in return for exacting taxes. The influence of Magna Carta ebbed and waned across centuries. The weakening of royal power it demonstrated was based more upon the instability presented by contested claims than thoughtful adherence to constitutional principles. Until 1534, the Church excommunicated people for violations, but after a time Magna Carta was simply replaced by other statutes considered binding upon the king to act according to "process of the law". Magna Carta's influence is considered greatly diminished by the reign of Henry VI, after the Wars of the Roses. The ideas contained in Magna Carta are widely considered to have influenced the United States Constitution.

The first known use of this English phrase occurred around 1500. Another early example of the phrase "rule of law" is found in a petition to James I of England in 1610, from the House of Commons:

Amongst many other points of happiness and freedom which your majesty's subjects of this kingdom have enjoyed under your royal progenitors, kings and queens of this realm, there is none which they have accounted more dear and precious than this, to be guided and governed by the certain rule of the law which giveth both to the head and members that which of right belongeth to them, and not by any uncertain or arbitrary form of government ...

=== Modern period (1500 CE – present) ===
In 1481, during the reign of Ferdinand II of Aragon, the Constitució de l'Observança was approved by the General Court of Catalonia, establishing the submission of royal power (included its officers) to the laws of the Principality of Catalonia.

In 1607, English Chief Justice Sir Edward Coke said in the Case of Prohibitions "that the law was the golden met-wand and measure to try the causes of the subjects; and which protected His Majesty in safety and peace: with which the King (James I) was greatly offended, and said, that then he should be under the law, which was treason to affirm, as he said; to which I said, that Bracton saith, quod Rex non debet esse sub homine, sed sub Deo et lege (that the King ought not to be under any man but under God and the law.)."

Among the first modern authors to use the term and give the principle theoretical foundations was Samuel Rutherford in Lex, Rex (1644). The title, Latin for "the law is king", subverts the traditional formulation rex lex ("the king is law"). James Harrington wrote in Oceana (1656), drawing principally on Aristotle's Politics, that among forms of government an "Empire of Laws, and not of Men" was preferable to an "Empire of Men, and not of Laws".

John Locke also discussed this issue in his Second Treatise of Government (1690):

The natural liberty of man is to be free from any superior power on earth, and not to be under the will or legislative authority of man, but to have only the law of nature for his rule. The liberty of man, in society, is to be under no other legislative power, but that established, by consent, in the commonwealth; nor under the dominion of any will, or restraint of any law, but what that legislative shall enact, according to the trust put in it. Freedom then is not what Sir Robert Filmer tells us, Observations, A. 55. a liberty for every one to do what he lists, to live as he pleases, and not to be tied by any laws: but freedom of men under government is, to have a standing rule to live by, common to every one of that society, and made by the legislative power erected in it; a liberty to follow my own will in all things, where the rule prescribes not; and not to be subject to the inconstant, uncertain, unknown, arbitrary will of another man: as freedom of nature is, to be under no other restraint but the law of nature.

The principle was also discussed by Montesquieu in The Spirit of Law (1748). The phrase "rule of law" appears in Samuel Johnson's Dictionary (1755).

In 1776, the notion that no one is above the law was popular during the founding of the United States. For example, Thomas Paine wrote in his pamphlet Common Sense that "in America, the law is king. For as in absolute governments the King is law, so in free countries the law ought to be king; and there ought to be no other." In 1780, John Adams enshrined this principle in Article VI of the Declaration of Rights in the Constitution of the Commonwealth of Massachusetts:

No man, nor corporation, or association of men, have any other title to obtain advantages, or particular and exclusive privileges, distinct from those of the community, than what arises from the consideration of services rendered to the public; and this title being in nature neither hereditary, nor transmissible to children, or descendants, or relations by blood, the idea of a man born a magistrate, lawgiver, or judge, is absurd and unnatural.

The term "rule of law" was popularised by British jurist A. V. Dicey, who viewed the rule of law in common law systems as comprising three principles. First, that government must follow the law that it makes; second, that no one is exempt from the operation of the law and that it applies equally to all; and third, that general rights emerge from particular cases decided by the courts.

The influence of Britain, France and the United States contributed to spreading the principle of the rule of law to other countries around the world.

== Legal theory and philosophy ==
The Oxford English Dictionary has defined rule of law as:

The authority and influence of law in society, esp. when viewed as a constraint on individual and institutional behaviour; (hence) the principle whereby all members of a society (including those in government) are considered equally subject to publicly disclosed legal codes and processes.

Despite wide use by politicians, judges and academics, the rule of law has been described as "an exceedingly elusive notion". In modern legal theory, there are at least two principal conceptions of the rule of law: a formalist or "thin" definition, and a substantive or "thick" definition. Formalist definitions of the rule of law do not make a judgment about the justness of law itself, but define specific procedural attributes that a legal framework must have in order to be in compliance with the rule of law. Substantive conceptions of the rule of law, generally from more recent authors, go beyond this and include certain substantive rights that are said to be based on, or derived from, the rule of law. One occasionally encounters a third "functional" conception.

The functional interpretation of the term rule of law contrasts the rule of law with the rule of man. According to the functional view, a society in which government officers have a great deal of discretion has a low degree of "rule of law", whereas a society in which government officers have little discretion has a high degree of "rule of law". Upholding the rule of law can sometimes require the punishment of those who commit offenses that are justifiable under natural law but not statutory law. The rule of law is thus somewhat at odds with flexibility, even when flexibility may be preferable.

=== Formalist conception ===
Formalist theorists claim that the rule of law requires procedural generality (general rules that apply to classes of persons and behaviors as opposed to individuals), publicity (no secret laws), prospective application (little or no retroactive laws), consistency (no contradictory laws), equality (applied equally throughout all society), and certainty (certainty of application for a given situation), but that there are no requirements with regard to the substantive content of the law. Formalists include A. V. Dicey, F. A. Hayek, Joseph Raz, and Joseph Unger.

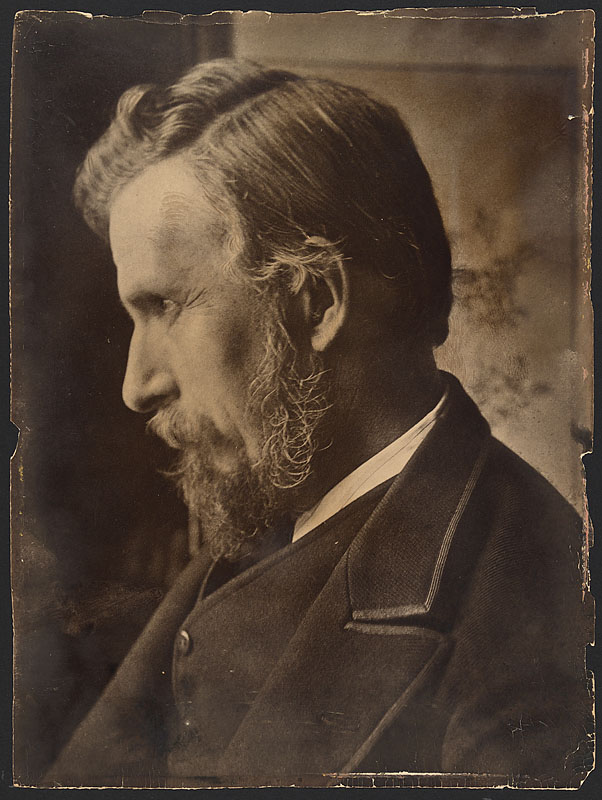
British constitutional theorist Albert Venn Dicey is often associated with the thin conception of the rule of law.

According to Dicey, the rule of law in the United Kingdom has three dominant characteristics: First, the absolute supremacy of regular law – a person is to be judged by a fixed set of rules and punished for breaching only the law, and is not to be subject to "the exercise by persons in authority of wide, arbitrary, or discretionary powers of constraint". Second, the equality of law — "the universal subjection of all classes to one law administered by the ordinary Courts". Third, the fact that, in the United Kingdom, the constitution is the result of the common law, being not the source but the consequence of citizens' rights.

A 1977 article by Joseph Raz argued that the rule of law means that people should obey the law and be ruled by it. Construed more narrowly, the rule of law would also mean that the government should be ruled by and subjected to the law. Following from Raz's general conception of the rule of law, he argued for the existence of two groups of principles of the rule of law: First, that the law is capable of guiding the behaviour of its subjects; second, that there exists an effective legal machinery that secures actual compliance with the rule of law. The first group comprises principles such as the accessibility, clarity, and prospective nature of the law; the stability of the law; and the compliance of lawmaking with "open, stable, clear and general rules" that create a stable framework, with such rules empowering authorities to make orders and providing guidelines for the exercise of such powers. The second group includes principles including judicial independence, natural justice, judicial review, and limited administrative discretion.

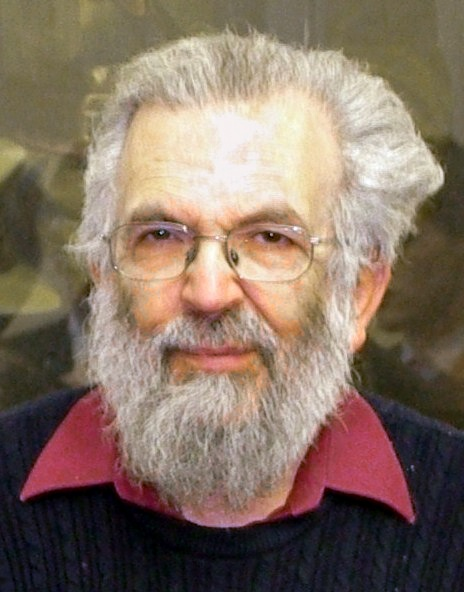
Joseph Raz in February 2009. He stated in a 1977 article that the rule of law requires that "the making of particular laws should be guided by open and relatively stable general rules".

In Raz's view, one of the virtues of the rule of law is the restraint it imposes on authorities. It aims to exclude arbitrary power, as most of the exercises of arbitrary power violate the rule of law. Arbitrary power is excluded when courts hold themselves accountable only to the law and observe "fairly strict procedures". Another virtue is the protection it accords to individual freedom, namely, "the sense of freedom in which it is identified with an effective ability to choose between as many options as possible". Most importantly, to adhere to the rule of law is to respect human dignity by "treating humans as persons capable of planning and plotting their future".

Raz also used the "sharpness of a knife" analogy to show that the rule of law is a neutral tool. He argued that just as a sharp knife makes both a surgeon and a murderer more efficient, the rule of law makes a legal system better at reaching its goals, regardless of whether those goals are actually moral.

Raz also identified some of the potential pitfalls of the rule of law. He opined that as the rule of law is designed "to minimise the harm to freedom and dignity which the law may cause in its pursuit of its goals however laudable these may be", the strict pursuit of the rule of law may prevent one from achieving certain social goals which may be preferable to the rule of law: "Sacrificing too many social goals on the altar of the rule of law may make the law barren and empty".

=== Substantive conception ===
Substantive theorists believe that the rule of law necessarily entails protection of individual rights. Some substantive theorists believe that democracy is part of the rule of law. Substantivists include Ronald Dworkin, Sir John Laws, Lon Fuller, Trevor Allan, and Tom Bingham holding that the rule of law intrinsically protects some or all individual rights.

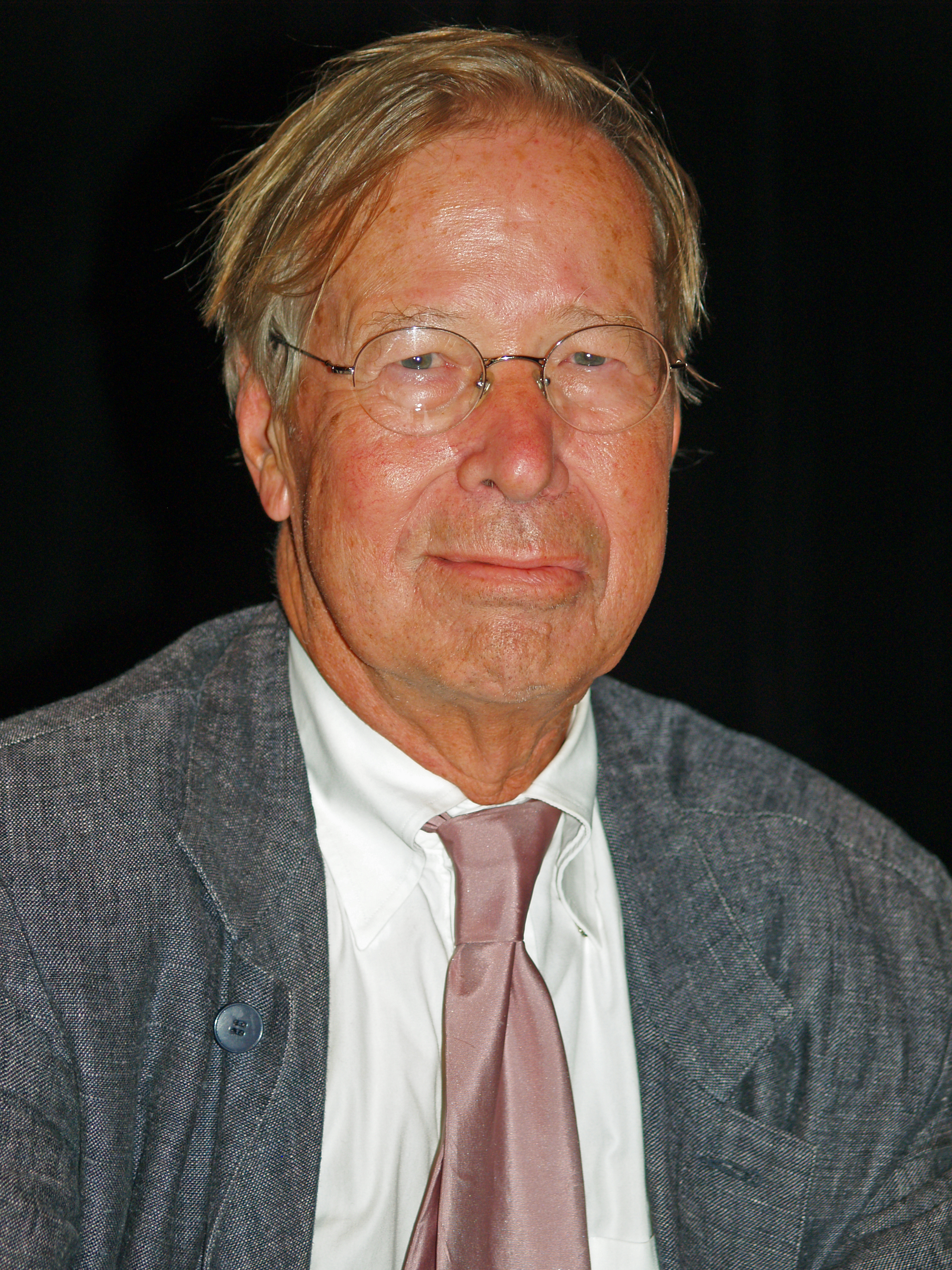
Ronald Dworkin in September 2008. Dworkin's conception of the rule of law is "thick", as it encompasses a substantive theory of law and adjudication.

Ronald Dworkin defines what he terms the "rights conception" of the rule of law as follows:

It assumes that citizens have moral rights and duties with respect to one another, and political rights against the state as a whole. It insists that these moral and political rights be recognized in positive law, so that they may be enforced upon the demand of individual citizens through courts or other judicial institutions of the familiar type, so far as this is practicable. The rule of law on this conception is the ideal of rule by an accurate public conception of individual rights. It does not distinguish, as the rule book conception does, between the rule of law and substantive justice; on the contrary it requires, as part of the ideal of law, that the rules in the book capture and enforce moral rights.

Paul Craig, in analysing Dworkin's view, drew three conclusions. First, Dworkin rejects the need to distinguish between "legal" rules and a more complete political philosophy, since the rule of law is basically the theory of law and adjudication that he believes is correct. Secondly, the rule of law is not simply the thin or formal rule of law; the latter forms part of Dworkin's theory of law and adjudication. Thirdly, since taking a substantive view of the rule of law requires choosing what the best theory of justice is, it is necessary to articulate particular conceptions of what liberty, equality and other freedoms require.

In his book, What Is the Rule of Law? Lon Fuller rejects legal positivism, the idea that law is no higher than a particular authority, that the law is morally neutral, and he sets out a list of requirements to include in his definition of the rule of law.

1. Laws must exist and those laws should be obeyed by all, including government officials.
2. Laws must be published.
3. Laws must be prospective in nature so that the effect of the law may only take place after the law has been passed. For example, the court cannot convict a person of a crime committed before a criminal statute prohibiting the conduct was passed.
4. Laws should be written with reasonable clarity to avoid unfair enforcement.
5. Law must avoid contradictions.
6. Law must not command the impossible.
7. Law must stay constant through time to allow the formalization of rules; however, law also must allow for timely revision when the underlying social and political circumstances have changed.
8. Official action should be consistent with the declared rule.

In his book, The Rule of Law Tom Bingham further has requirements not only on how the laws must be handled, but also requirements that the laws must follow to include in his definition of the rule of law.

1. The Law Must Be Accessible
2. As far as possible, use law, not discretion
3. Equality before the law
4. Exercise of power must be used for the purpose for which the power were conferred
5. Respect for Human Rights
6. Means must be for resolving disputes for which the parties themselves are not able to resolve
7. Everyone should have a right to legal redress and to fair trials
8. The laws must be in compliance with international law

== Social science analyses ==
=== Economics ===
Economists and lawyers have studied and analysed the rule of law's impact on economic development. In particular, a major question in the area of law and economics is whether the rule of law matters to economic development, particularly in developing nations. The economist F. A. Hayek analyzed how the rule of law might be beneficial to the free market. Hayek proposed that under the rule of law, individuals would be able to make wise investments and future plans with some confidence in a successful return on investment when he stated: "under the Rule of Law the government is prevented from stultifying individual efforts by ad hoc action. Within the known rules of the game the individual is free to pursue his personal ends and desires, certain that the powers of government will not be used deliberately to frustrate his efforts."

Studies have shown that weak rule of law (for example, discretionary regulatory enforcement) discourages investment. Economists have found, for example, that a rise in discretionary regulatory enforcement caused US firms to abandon international investments.

Constitutional economics is the study of the compatibility of economic and financial decisions within existing constitutional law frameworks. Aspects of constitutional frameworks relevant to both the rule of law and public economics include government spending on the judiciary, which, in many transitional and developing countries, is completely controlled by the executive. Additionally, judicial corruption may arise from both the executive branch and private actors. Standards of constitutional economics such as transparency can also be used during annual budget processes for the benefit of the rule of law. Further, the availability of an effective court system in situations of unfair government spending and executive impoundment of previously authorized appropriations is a key element for the success of the rule of law.

Nobel laureates Daron Acemoglu and James A. Robinson emphasize the importance of the rule of law for promoting inclusive institutions, which are key to sustained economic growth and prosperity by ensuring that laws apply equally to everyone, including elites and government officials. The authors highlight historical examples, such as the French Revolution, where the rule of law helped dismantle absolutism and feudal privileges, paving the way for inclusive institutions. They also discuss how pluralistic political institutions are essential for the rule of law to thrive, as they create broad coalitions that support fairness and equality.

=== Comparative approaches ===
Legal systems of the world, with common law in red, and civil law in blue

The term "rule of law" has been used primarily in the English-speaking countries, and it is not yet fully clarified with regard to such well-established democracies such as Sweden, Denmark, France, Germany, or Japan. A common language between lawyers of common law and civil law countries is critically important for research of links between the rule of law and real economy.

The rule of law can be hampered when there is a disconnect between legal and popular consensus. For example, under the auspices of the World Intellectual Property Organization, nominally strong copyright laws have been implemented throughout most of the world; but because the attitude of much of the population does not conform to these laws, a rebellion against ownership rights has manifested in rampant piracy, including an increase in peer-to-peer file sharing. Similarly, in Russia, tax evasion is common and a person who admits he does not pay taxes is not judged or criticized by his colleagues and friends, because the tax system is viewed as unreasonable. Bribery likewise has different normative implications across cultures.

=== Education ===
UNESCO has argued that education has an important role in promoting the rule of law and a culture of lawfulness, providing an important protective function by strengthening learners' abilities to face and overcome difficult life situations. Young people can be important contributors to a culture of lawfulness, and governments can provide educational support that nurtures positive values and attitudes in future generations. A movement towards education for justice seeks to promote the rule of law in schools.

=== Political science ===
Francis Fukuyama in his book The Origins of Political Order states the rule of law is a requirement for stability.

== Status in various jurisdictions ==
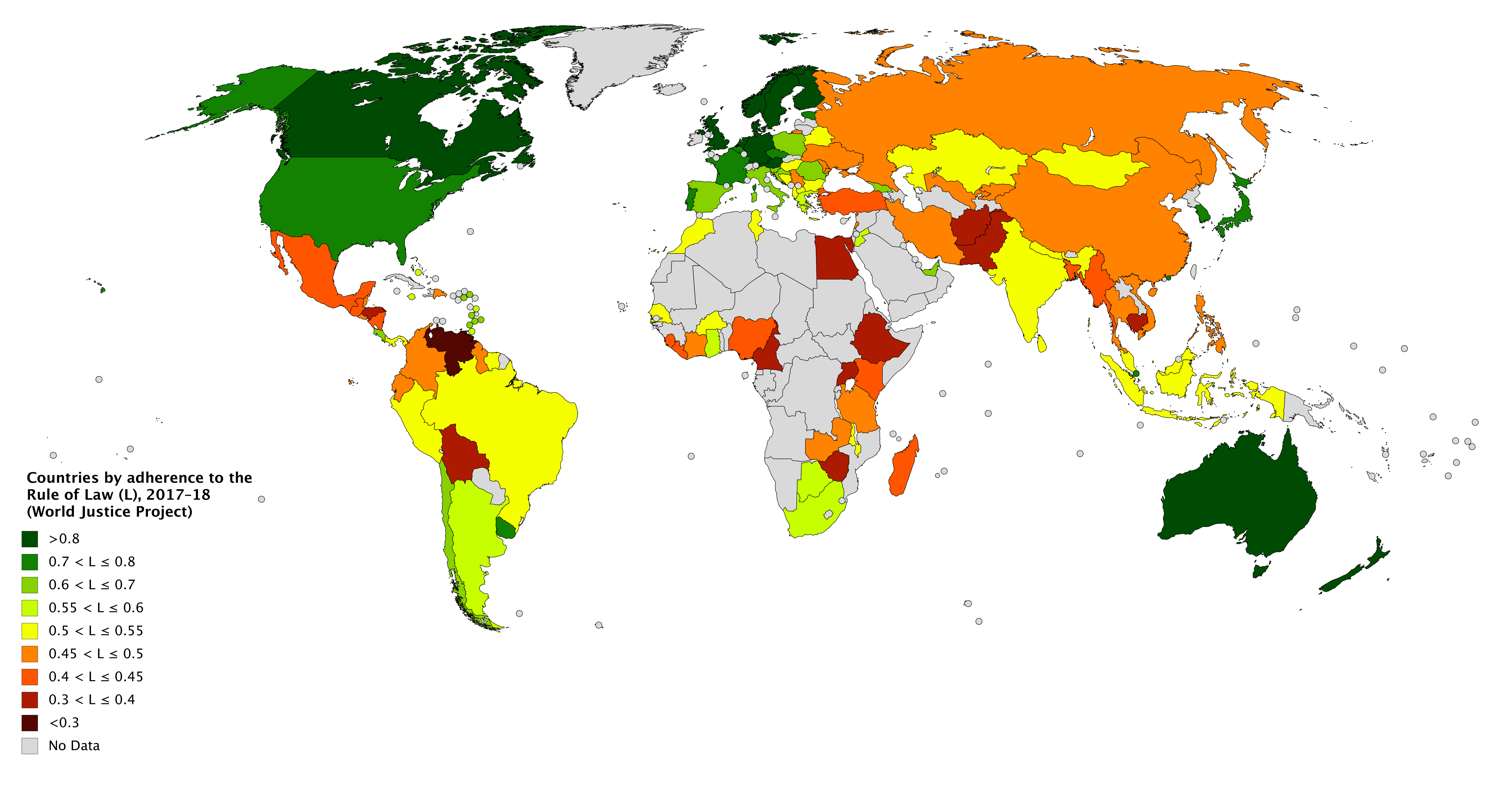
Countries by adherence to the Rule of Law according to the 2017–18 World Justice Project report

The rule of law has been considered one of the key dimensions that determine the quality and good governance of a country. Research, like the Worldwide Governance Indicators, defines the rule of law as "the extent to which agents have confidence and abide by the rules of society, and in particular the quality of contract enforcement, the police and the courts, as well as the likelihood of crime or violence." Based on this definition the Worldwide Governance Indicators project has developed aggregate measurements for the rule of law in more than 200 countries, as seen in the map at right. Other evaluations such as the World Justice Project Rule of Law Index show that adherence to rule of law fell in 61% of countries in 2022. Globally, this means that 4.4 billion people live in countries where rule of law declined in 2021.

Lapses in the rule of law can arise in conflict between two or more countries.

=== Europe ===
The preamble of the rule of law European Convention for the Protection of Human Rights and Fundamental Freedoms says "the governments of European countries which are like-minded and have a common heritage of political traditions, ideals, freedom and the rule of law".

In France and Germany the concepts of rule of law (Etat de droit and Rechtsstaat respectively) are analogous to the principles of constitutional supremacy and protection of fundamental rights from public authorities, particularly the legislature. France was one of the early pioneers of the ideas of the rule of law. The German interpretation is more rigid but similar to that of France and the United Kingdom.

==== United Kingdom ====
In the United Kingdom the rule of law is a long-standing principle of the way the country is governed, dating from England's Magna Carta in 1215 and the Bill of Rights 1689. In the 19th century classic work Introduction to the Study of the Law of the Constitution (1885), A. V. Dicey, a constitutional scholar and lawyer, wrote of the twin pillars of the British constitution: the rule of law and parliamentary sovereignty.

=== Americas ===
==== United States ====
All government officers of the United States, including the President, Justices of the Supreme Court, state judges and legislators, and all members of Congress, pledge first and foremost to uphold the Constitution, affirming that the rule of law is superior to the rule of any human leader. At the same time, the federal government has considerable discretion: the legislative branch is free to decide what statutes it will write, as long as it stays within its enumerated powers and respects the constitutionally protected rights of individuals. Likewise, the judicial branch has a degree of judicial discretion, and the executive branch also has various discretionary powers including prosecutorial discretion and executive privilege.

James Wilson said during the Philadelphia Convention in 1787 that, "Laws may be unjust, may be unwise, may be dangerous, may be destructive; and yet not be so unconstitutional as to justify the Judges in refusing to give them effect." George Mason agreed that judges "could declare an unconstitutional law void. But with regard to every law, however unjust, oppressive or pernicious, which did not come plainly under this description, they would be under the necessity as judges to give it a free course." Chief Justice John Marshall a similar position in 1827: "When its existence as law is denied, that existence cannot be proved by showing what are the qualities of a law."

Scholars continue to debate whether the U.S. Constitution adopted a particular interpretation of the "rule of law", and if so, which one. For example, John Harrison asserts that the word "law" in the Constitution is simply defined as that which is legally binding, rather than being "defined by formal or substantive criteria", and therefore judges do not have discretion to decide that laws fail to satisfy such unwritten and vague criteria. Law professor Frederick Mark Gedicks disagrees, writing that Cicero, Augustine, Thomas Aquinas, and the framers of the U.S. Constitution believed that "an unjust law was not really a law at all".

Some modern scholars contend that the rule of law has been corroded during the past century by the instrumental view of law promoted by legal realists such as Oliver Wendell Holmes and Roscoe Pound. For example, Brian Tamanaha asserts: "The rule of law is a centuries-old ideal, but the notion that law is a means to an end became entrenched only in the course of the nineteenth and twentieth centuries."

Others argue that the rule of law has survived but was transformed to allow for the exercise of discretion by administrators. For much of American history, the dominant notion of the rule of law in administrative law has been some version of Dicey's, that is, individuals should be able to challenge an administrative order by bringing suit in a court of general jurisdiction. The increased number of administrative cases led to fears that excess judicial oversight over administrative decisions would overwhelm the courts and destroy the advantages of specialization that led to the creation of administrative agencies in the first place. By 1941, a compromise had emerged. If administrators adopted procedures that more or less tracked "the ordinary legal manner" of the courts, further review of the facts by "the ordinary Courts of the land" was unnecessary. Thus Dicey's rule of law was recast into a purely procedural form.

Numerous definitions of "rule of law" are used in United States governmental bodies. An organization's definition might depend on that organization's goal. For instance, military occupation or counterinsurgency campaigns may necessitate prioritising physical security over human rights. U.S. Army doctrine and U.S. Government (USG) interagency agreements might see the rule of law as a principle of governance: Outlines of different definitions are given in a JAG Corps handbook for judge advocates deployed with the US Army.

On July 1, 2024, in Trump v. United States, the Supreme Court held that presidents have absolute immunity for acts committed as president within their core constitutional purview, at least presumptive immunity for official acts within the outer perimeter of their official responsibility, and no immunity for unofficial acts. Legal scholars have warned of the negative impact of this decision on the status of rule of law in the United States. Prior to that, in 1973 and 2000 the Office of Legal Counsel within the Department of Justice issued opinions saying that a sitting president cannot be indicted or prosecuted, but it is constitutional to indict and try a former president for the same offenses for which the President was impeached by the House of Representatives and acquitted by the Senate under the Impeachment Disqualification Clause of Article I, Section III.

Trump's second term has raised concerns among experts, including the American Bar Association, that the rule of law in the United States is seriously threatened. A particular point of concern is whether the administration will follow court orders.

==== Canada ====
In Canada, the rule of law is associated with A.V. Dicey's view. It is mentioned in the preamble to the Constitution Act, 1982. The Constitution of Canada is "similar in principle" to the British constitution, and includes unwritten constitutional principles of democracy, judicial independence, federalism, constitutionalism and the rule of law, and the protection of minorities.

In 1959, Roncarelli v Duplessis, the Supreme Court of Canada called the Rule of Law a "fundamental postulate" of the Canadian Constitution. According to Reference Re Secession of Quebec, it encompasses, "a sense of orderliness, of subjection to known legal rules and of executive accountability to legal authority." In Canadian law, it means that the relationship between the state and the individual must be regulated by law and that the Constitution binds all governments, both federal and provincial, including the executive. With the adoption of the Canadian Charter of Rights and Freedoms, the Canadian system of government was transformed to a significant extent from a system of Parliamentary supremacy to one of constitutional supremacy. The principle of the rule of law and constitutionalism is aided by acknowledging that the constitution is entrenched beyond simple majority rule. However, the notwithstanding clause operates to provide a limited "legislative override" of certain fundamental freedoms contained in the Charter, and has been invoked at different times by provincial legislatures.

In Canadian administrative law, "all exercises of public authority must find their source in law. All decision-making powers have legal limits, derived from the enabling statute itself, the common or civil law or the Constitution. Judicial review is the means by which the courts supervise those who exercise statutory powers, to ensure that they do not overstep their legal authority. The function of judicial review is therefore to ensure the legality, the reasonableness and the fairness of the administrative process and its outcomes." Administrative decision makers must adopt a culture of justification and demonstrate that their exercise of delegated public power can be "justified to citizens in terms of rationality and fairness."

=== Asia ===
East Asian cultures are influenced by two schools of thought, Confucianism, which advocated good governance as rule by leaders who are benevolent and virtuous, and legalism, which advocated strict adherence to law. The influence of one school of thought over the other has varied throughout the centuries. One study indicates that throughout East Asia, only South Korea, Singapore, Japan, Taiwan and Hong Kong have societies that are robustly committed to a law-bound state. According to Awzar Thi, a member of the Asian Human Rights Commission, the rule of law in Cambodia and most of Asia is weak or nonexistent:

Apart from a number of states and territories, across the continent there is a huge gulf between the rule of law rhetoric and reality. In Thailand, the police force is favor over the rich and corrupted. In Cambodia, judges are proxies for the ruling political party ... That a judge may harbor political prejudice or apply the law unevenly are the smallest worries for an ordinary criminal defendant in Asia. More likely ones are: Will the police fabricate the evidence? Will the prosecutor bother to show up? Will the judge fall asleep? Will I be poisoned in prison? Will my case be completed within a decade?

In countries such as China and Vietnam, the transition to a market economy has been a major factor in a move toward the rule of law, because the rule of law is important to foreign investors and to economic development. It remains unclear whether the rule of law in countries like China and Vietnam will be limited to commercial matters or will spill into other areas as well, and if so whether that spillover will enhance prospects for related values such as democracy and human rights.

==== China ====
In China, the phrase fǎzhì (法治), which can be translated as "rule of law," means using the law as an instrument to facilitate social control.

Late Qing dynasty legal reforms unsuccessfully sought to implement Western legal principles including the rule of law and judicial independence. Judicial independence further decreased in the Republic of China under Chiang Kai-shek per the Kuomintang's policy of particization (danghua), under which administrative judges were required to have "deep comprehension" of the KMT's principles.

After China's reform and opening-up, the Communist Party emphasized the rule of law as a basic strategy and method for state management of society. Jiang Zemin first called for establishing a socialist rule of law at the Fifteenth Party Congress in 1997. Despite the CCP's Document 9 arguing that Western values have corrupted many people's understanding of the rule of law, the CCP has simultaneously endorsed governing the country in accordance with the rule of law. These factors likely suggest that the CCP is creating a rule of law with Chinese characteristics, which may simply entail modifying the Western notion of rule of law to best match China's unique political, social, and historical conditions. As Document 9 suggests, the CCP does not see judicial independence, separation of power, or constitutional forms of governance as defined by Western society, as suiting China's unique form of governance. This unique version of the rule of law with Chinese characteristics has led to different attempts to define China's method of governing the country by rule of law domestically and internationally.

In his writings on socialist rule of law in China, Xi Jinping has emphasized traditional Chinese concepts including people as the root of the state (mingben), "the ideal of no lawsuit" (tianxia wusong), "respecting rite and stressing law" (longli zhongfa), "virtue first, penalty second" (dezhu xingfu), and "promoting virtue and being prudent in punishment" (mingde shenfa). Xi states that the two fundamental aspects of the socialist rule of law are: that the political and legal organs (including courts, the police, and the procuratorate) must believe in the law and uphold the law; and all political and legal officials must follow the Communist Party.

==== India ====
The Constitution of India is intended to limit governmental discretion, and the judiciary uses judicial review to uphold it, especially Fundamental Rights. The Supreme Court of India has held that the rule of law forms part of the Constitution's "basic structure", a feature that Parliament cannot abrogate even by constitutional amendment. It has also interpreted the guarantee of equality under Article 14 as "antithetical to arbitrariness", making arbitrary state action unconstitutional even where a statute authorizes it. Although some people have criticized the Indian judiciary for judicial activism, others believe such actions are needed to safeguard the rule of law under the Constitution and to preserve judicial independence, an important part of the basic structure doctrine.

Whether India practises these constitutional ideals is debatable; the World Justice Project's 2025 Rule of Law Index ranked it 86th out of 143 countries. The Government of India has disputed the methodology of international governance indices, arguing that they rely on small expert panels and subjective perceptions rather than measurable outcomes. As of 21 July 2026, over 52 million cases are pending before Indian courts according to the National Judicial Data Grid (NJDG). At the end of 2023, 73.5% of the 5,30,333 people held in Indian prisons were undertrial prisoners awaiting the conclusion of proceedings. Tarunabh Khaitan argues that accountability of institutions has been weakened incrementally through "executive aggrandisement and party-state fusion", achieved through many individually modest measures, each defensible in isolation, which cumulatively weakens accountability.

==== Japan ====
Japan had centuries of tradition prior to World War II, during which there were laws, but they did not provide a central organizing principle for society, and they did not constrain the powers of government. As the 21st century began, the percentage of people who were lawyers and judges in Japan remained very low relative to western Europe and the United States, and legislation in Japan tended to be terse and general, leaving much discretion in the hands of bureaucrats.

== Organisations ==
Various organizations are involved in promoting the rule of law.

=== EU Commission ===
The rule of law is enshrined in Article 2 of the Treaty on European Union as one of the common values for all Member States. Under the rule of law, all public powers always act within the constraints set out by law, in accordance with the values of democracy and fundamental rights, and under the control of independent and impartial courts. The rule of law includes principles such as legality, implying a transparent, accountable, democratic and pluralistic process for enacting laws; legal certainty; prohibiting the arbitrary exercise of executive power; effective judicial protection by independent and impartial courts, effective judicial review including respect for fundamental rights; separation of powers; and equality before the law. These principles have been recognised by the European Court of Justice and the European Court of Human Rights. In addition, the Council of Europe has developed standards and issued opinions and recommendations which provide well-established guidance to promote and uphold the rule of law.

=== The Council of Europe ===
The Statute of the Council of Europe characterizes the rule of law as one of the core principles which the establishment of the organization based on. The paragraph 3 of the preamble of the Statute of the Council of Europe states: "Reaffirming their devotion to the spiritual and moral values which are the common heritage of their peoples and the true source of individual freedom, political liberty and the rule of law, principles which form the basis of all genuine democracy." The Statute lays the compliance with the rule of law principles as a condition for the European states to be a full member of the organization.

=== International Commission of Jurists ===
In 1959, an event took place in New Delhi and speaking as the International Commission of Jurists, made a declaration as to the fundamental principle of the rule of law. The event consisted of over 185 judges, lawyers, and law professors from 53 countries. This later became known as the Declaration of Delhi. During the declaration they declared that the rule of law implied certain rights and freedoms, an independent judiciary, and social, economic and cultural conditions conducive to human dignity. One aspect not included in The Declaration of Delhi was for rule of law requiring legislative power to be subject to judicial review.

=== United Nations ===
Upholding the rule of law is at the heart of the United Nations' mission. The Secretary-General of the United Nations defines the concept as:

a principle of governance in which all persons, institutions and entities, public and private, including the State itself, are accountable to laws that are publicly promulgated, equally enforced and independently adjudicated, and which are consistent with international human rights norms and standards. It requires, as well, measures to ensure adherence to the principles of supremacy of law, equality before the law, accountability to the law, fairness in the application of the law, separation of powers, participation in decision-making, legal certainty, avoidance of arbitrariness and procedural and legal transparency.

The General Assembly has considered rule of law an agenda item since 1992, with renewed interest since 2006 and has adopted resolutions at its last three sessions. The Security Council has held a number of thematic debates on the rule of law, and adopted resolutions emphasizing the importance of these issues in the context of women, peace and security, children in armed conflict, and the protection of civilians in armed conflict. The Peacebuilding Commission has also regularly addressed rule of law issues with respect to countries on its agenda. The Vienna Declaration and Programme of Action also requires the rule of law be included in human rights education. Additionally, the Sustainable Development Goal 16, a component of the 2030 Agenda is aimed at promoting the rule of law at national and international levels.

In Our Common Agenda, the United Nations Secretary General announced that "in support of efforts to put people at the center of justice systems, I will promote a new vision for the rule of law, building on Sustainable Development Goal 16 and the 2012 Declaration of the High-level Meeting of the General Assembly on the Rule of Law at the National and International Levels." He published his new, action-oriented vision in 2023.

=== International Bar Association ===
The Council of the International Bar Association passed a resolution in 2009 endorsing a substantive or "thick" definition of the rule of law:

An independent, impartial judiciary; the presumption of innocence; the right to a fair and public trial without undue delay; a rational and proportionate approach to punishment; a strong and independent legal profession; strict protection of confidential communications between lawyer and client; equality of all before the law; these are all fundamental principles of the Rule of Law. Accordingly, arbitrary arrests; secret trials; indefinite detention without trial; cruel or degrading treatment or punishment; intimidation or corruption in the electoral process, are all unacceptable. The Rule of Law is the foundation of a civilised society. It establishes a transparent process accessible and equal to all. It ensures adherence to principles that both liberate and protect. The IBA calls upon all countries to respect these fundamental principles. It also calls upon its members to speak out in support of the Rule of Law within their respective communities.

=== World Justice Project ===
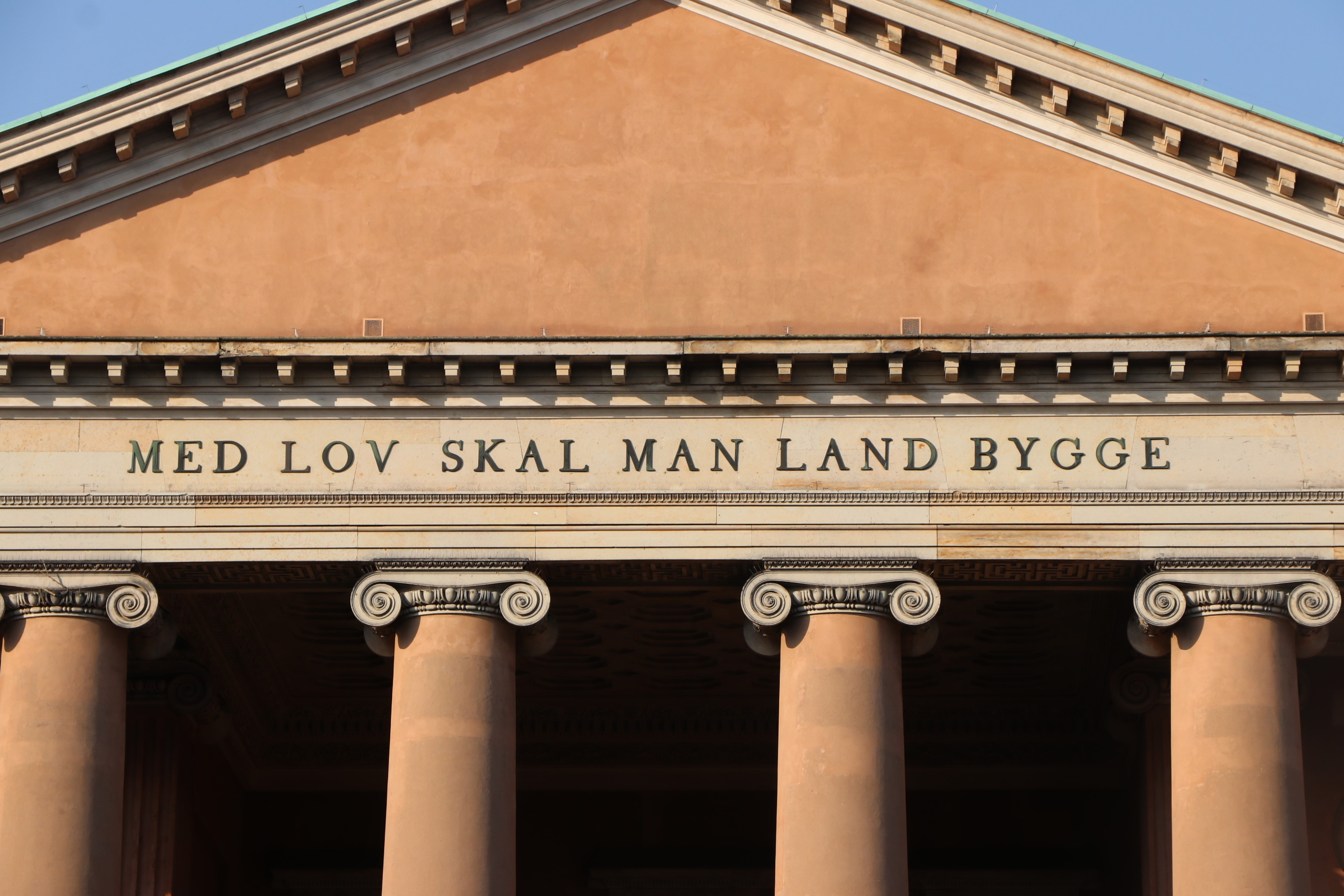
"With law shall the land be built", the preface of Codex Holmiensis above Copenhagen Court House. In 2023, the WJP ranked Denmark no. 1 on their Rule of Law Index.

The World Justice Project (WJP) is an international organization that produces independent research and data, in order to build awareness, and stimulate action to advance the rule of law.

The World Justice Project defines the rule of law as a durable system of laws, institutions, norms, and country commitment that uphold four universal principles:

1. Accountability: the government and its officials and agents are accountable under the law.
2. Just Law: the law is clear, publicized, and stable, and is applied evenly. It ensures human rights as well as properly, contract, and procedural rights.
3. Open Government: the processes enforced are accessible, fair, and efficient.
4. Accessible and Impartial Justice: justice is delivered timely by competent, ethical, and independent representatives and neutrals who are accessible, have adequate resources, and reflect the makeup of the communities they serve.

Their flagship WJP Rule of Law Index, measures the extent to which 140 countries and jurisdictions adhere to the rule of law across eight dimensions: Constraints on Government Powers, Absence of Corruption, Open Government, Fundamental Rights, Order and Security, Regulatory Enforcement, Civil Justice, and Criminal Justice.

=== International Development Law Organization ===
The International Development Law Organization (IDLO) is an intergovernmental organization with a joint focus on the promotion of rule of law and development. It works to empower people and communities to claim their rights, and provides governments with the know-how to realize them. It supports emerging economies and middle-income countries to strengthen their legal capacity and rule of law framework for sustainable development and economic opportunity. It is the only intergovernmental organization with an exclusive mandate to promote the rule of law and has experience working in more than 90 countries around the world.

The International Development Law Organization has a holistic definition of the rule of law:

More than a matter of due process, the rule of law is an enabler of justice and development. The three notions are interdependent; when realized, they are mutually reinforcing. For IDLO, as much as a question of laws and procedure, the rule of law is a culture and daily practice. It is inseparable from equality, from access to justice and education, from access to health and the protection of the most vulnerable. It is crucial for the viability of communities and nations, and for the environment that sustains them.

=== International Network to Promote the Rule of Law ===
The International Network to Promote the Rule of Law is an international network of law practitioners working on rule of law issues in post-conflict and developing countries from a policy, practice and research perspective. INPROL is based at the US Institute of Peace in partnership with the US Department of State Bureau of International Narcotics and Law Enforcement, the Organization for Security and Cooperation in Europe Strategic Police Matters Unit, the Center of Excellence for Police Stability Unit, and William and Mary School of Law in the United States.

=== United Nations Environment Programme ===
The United Nations Environment Programme hosts the secretariat of the Montevideo Programme for the Development and Periodic Review of Environmental law. UNEP publishes periodic global reports on the status of environmental rule of law.

== See also ==
- Consent of the governed – Consent as source of political legitimacy
- Constitutional liberalism – Form of government
- International Network to Promote the Rule of Law
- Kritarchy – Ancient Israelite system of rule by Biblical judges
- Law of the jungle – Expression for behavior without rule of law
- Liberal international order – Global relationships since the late 1940s
- Might makes right – View that morality is, or ought to be, determined by those in power
- Moral absolutism – Metaethical position that some actions are intrinsically right or wrong
- Ochlocracy – Democracy spoiled by demagoguery and the rule of passion over reason (mob rule)
- Philosophy of law – Theoretical study of law
- Right of conquest – Concept in political science
- Rule of man – Type of personal rule
- Separation of powers – Division of a state's government into branches
- Social contract – Concept in political philosophy
- Sovereign immunity – Legal doctrine

=== Safeguards ===
- Due process – Requirement that courts respect all legal rights owed to people
- Equality before the law – Judicial principle
- Habeas corpus – Court action challenging unlawful detention
- Justice delayed is justice denied – Legal maxim
- Legal certainty – Legal principle
- Minority rights – Rights of members of minority groups
- Nuremberg principles – Guidelines for determining what constitutes a war crime
- Rechtsstaat – Continental European legal doctrine
- Right to an effective remedy – Right of a person whose human rights have been violated to legal remedy

=== Legal and criminal justice practices ===
- Abuse of process – Legal tort of misusing court processes unjustified by legal actions being taken
- Crime statistics – Quantitative data on criminal behavior
- Dark figure of crime – Term used by criminologists and sociologists
- Judicial activism – Controversial judicial practice
- Jury nullification – Type of jury verdict in criminal trials
- Law enforcement – Enforcement of the law by some members of society
- Lawfare – Weaponization of legal systems
- Legal doctrine – Set of rules or procedures through which judgements can be determined in a legal case
- Perverting the course of justice – Criminal offence
- Public interest law – Legal practices undertaken to help poor or marginalized people
- Sentencing disparity – Form of unequal treatment
- Strategic litigation – Litigation intended to change society

=== Legal scholars ===
- Thomas Bingham, Baron Bingham of Cornhill – British judge (1933–2010)
- A. V. Dicey – British jurist and constitutional theorist (1835–1922)
- Joseph Raz – Israeli philosopher (1939–2022)

== Sources ==
This article incorporates text from a free content work. Licensed under CC BY-SA (license statement/permission). Text taken from Strengthening the rule of law through education: A guide for policymakers, 63, UNESCO.

== Bibliography ==
- Bingham, Thomas (2010). The rule of law. London New York: Allen Lane. ISBN 978-1-84614-090-7. OCLC 458734142.
- Dworkin, Ronald (1985). A Matter of Principle. Cambridge, Massachusetts: Harvard University Press. ISBN 0674554604.
- Gowder, Paul (Winter 2018). "Resisting the Rule of Men". Saint Louis University Law Journal. 62 (2).
- Oakeshott, Michael (2006). "Chapters 31 and 32". In Terry Nardin and Luke O'Sullivan (ed.). Lectures in the History of Political Thought. Exeter, UK: Imprint Academic. p. 515. ISBN 978-1-84540-093-4. OCLC 63185299.
- Shlaes, Amity, The Forgotten Man: A New History of the Great Depression, "The Rules of the Game and Economic Recovery".
- Torre, Alessandro, United Kingdom, Il Mulino, Bologna, 2005.
- 深津栄一 (1989-01-10). "国際裁判と「法の支配」". In 染野義信博士古希記念論文集刊行会 (ed.). 染野義信博士古希記念論文集：法と現代司法 (第1版 ed.). 勁草書房. pp. 269–288. ISBN 4-326-40120-6.
