= Dmitry Titov =

Russian United Nations official

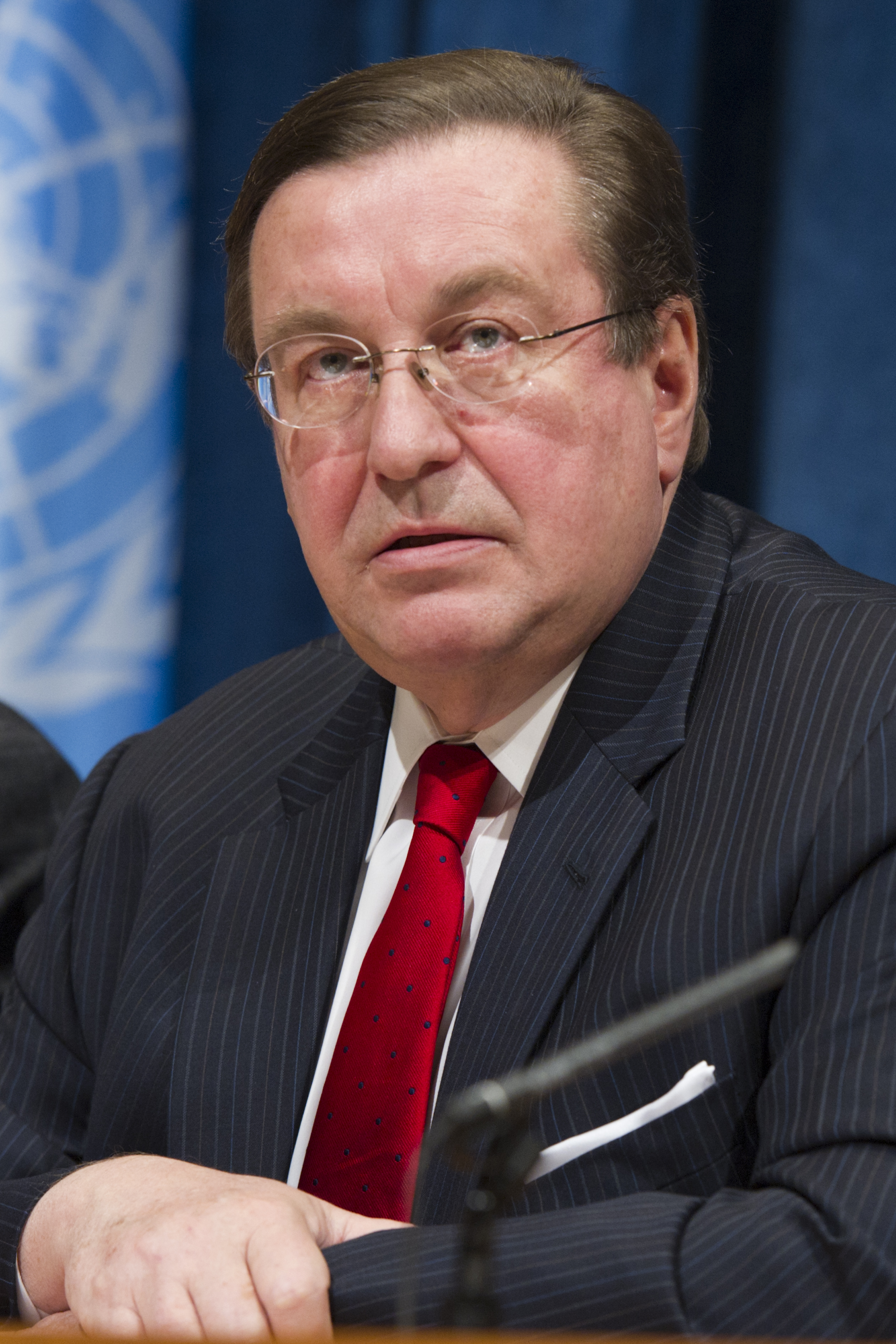
Assistant Secretary-General for Rule of Law and Security Institutions Dmitry Titov in a press conference at UNHQ April 2013.

Dmitry Titov (born 1950) was the United Nations Assistant Secretary-General for the Rule of Law and Security Institutions in the Department of Peacekeeping Operations until April 19, 2017. He was appointed by UN Secretary General Ban Ki-moon on July 27, 2007.

Titov brought with him 16 years of experience in the field of UN peacekeeping with a focus on the rule of law and security sector reform. Before his appointment to the current position, he served as the head of the Africa Division in the Department of Peacekeeping Operations. Since he joined the UN in 1991, Titov has overseen many operations and served in different capacities. Before he joined the UN, Titov served in the diplomatic service of the Russian Federation. At the time, he worked primarily on Security Council matters.

He studied international relations and graduated from the Moscow State Institute of International Relations (MGIMO).
