= Pearson Centre =

Canadian peacekeeping non-profit (1994–2013)

The Pearson Centre
- Pearson next to Chretien, whose government would in 1994 found the Pearson Centre
- Type: Independent, not-for-profit organization
- Active: 1994–2013
- Affiliations: AU; CFC; Canadian Red Cross; CARE Canada; Cérium; Cornwallis Group; Ecole de Maintien de la Paix (Bamako); ECOWAS; EU; Folke Bernadotte Academy; GoC; DFAIT; DND; CIDA; IADC; International Association of Peacekeeping Training Centres; KAIPTC; Norman Paterson School of International Affairs; NATO; Oxfam Canada; Réseau de recherche sur les opérations de paix; RCMP; RMC; UNAC; UNICEF; UN DPKO; UNHCR; USIP
- President: Kevin McGarr
- Administrative staff: 200 facilitators and experts on hand + 17 staff in the Ottawa office
- Students: Since 1994, over 23,000 individuals from 150 nations in 31 countries.
- Location: 1101 - 135 Prince of Wales Drive, Ottawa, Ontario, Canada
- Colours: Green and blue
- Website: www.pearsoncentre.org

Established in 1994 by the Government of Canada as the Lester B. Pearson Canadian International Peacekeeping Training Centre (more commonly the Pearson Peacekeeping Centre, or simply the Pearson Centre) was an independent, not-for-profit organization with its office based in Ottawa, Ontario, Canada. Its mandate was to support Canada's contribution to international peace and security. Operations ceased and the Centre closed around 2011. The property was sold by the government of Canada to a private individual in November 2013.

The Pearson Centre conducted education, training and research on all aspects of peace operations throughout the world, with the majority of its projects under way in Africa and Latin America. Services ranged from the training of police officers in Rwanda and Nigeria to serve as peacekeepers in Darfur; through delivery of pre-deployment training for Latin American peace keepers in Brasília; to the design and delivery of complex training exercises for use in Europe and Africa.

It also raised revenue through its specialized training and management courses, which it ran for individuals, governments and organizations around the world.

While in operation, the Pearson Centre worked with the Kofi Annan International Peacekeeping Training Centre in Ghana. The Centre provided facilitation support to the International Network to Promote the Rule of Law, which is a project of the USIP. The International Association of Peacekeeping Training Centres (IAPTC) was founded on July 2, 1995, at the Pearson Peacekeeping Centre. The Pearson Centre also worked closely with the Canadian extractive sector to implement the Voluntary Principles on Security and Human Rights and provide training strategies to ensure that their security providers adhere to these international standards.

== History ==
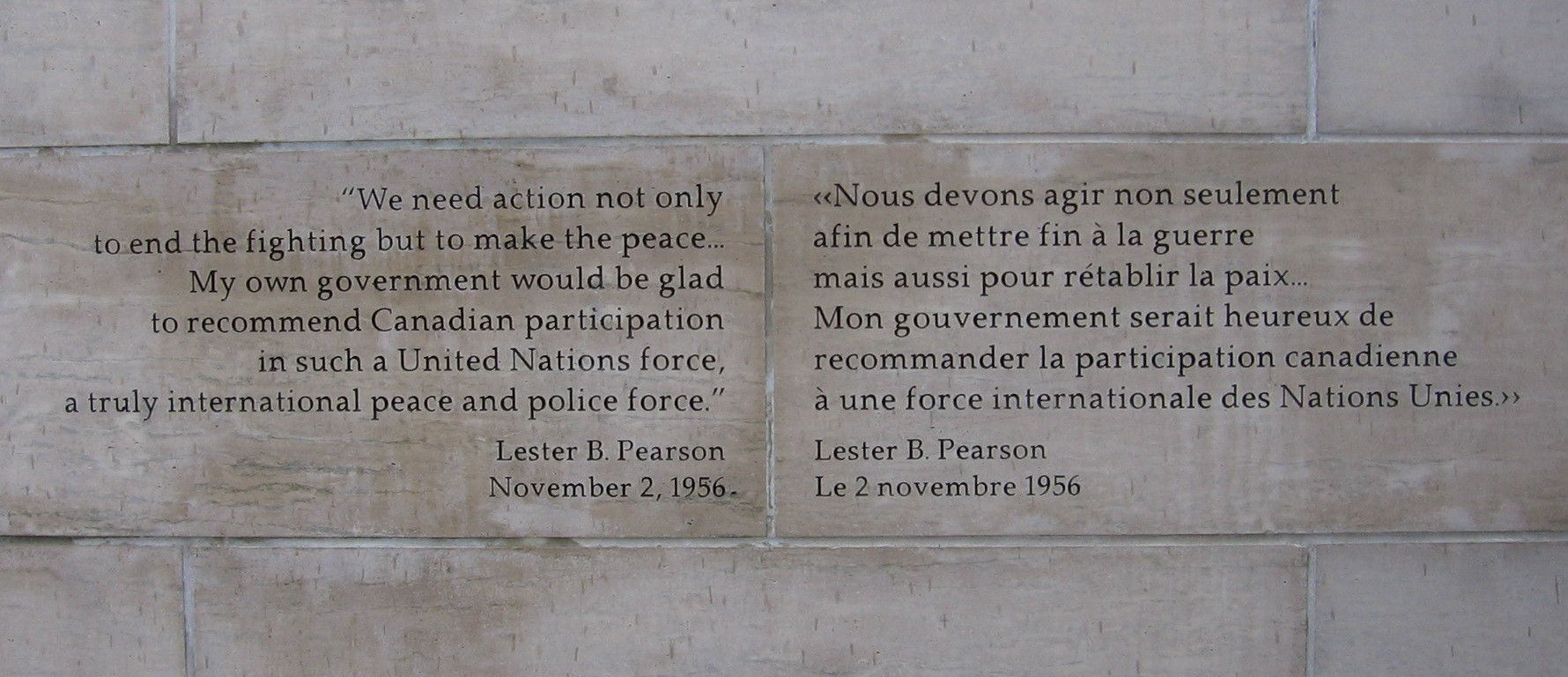
Lester B. Pearson committed Canada to peacekeeping on November 2, 1956 - from on the Ottawa Peacekeeping Monument

The Lester B. Pearson Canadian International Peacekeeping Training Centre was created as an offshoot of the now-defunct Canadian Institute of Strategic Studies and became an independent organisation in its own right in 2001. Named in honour of Lester Bowles Pearson, the former Prime Minister of Canada and recipient of the 1957 Nobel Peace Prize for his role in the inception of peacekeeping, the centre was established initially to train Canadian and foreign soldiers in the art of peacekeeping and conflict resolution for postings with United Nations Peacekeeping missions.

Lt.-Col. Alex Morrison was the first president of the Pearson Peacekeeping Centre, which was established in 1994 by the first Chretien government. He was followed by Sandra Dunsmore, and later Suzanne Monaghan. In 2012, the presidency of the centre was assumed by Kevin McGarr, previously head of CATSA.

In 1994, Jean-Jacques Blais was appointed chair of the centre, holding that position until he retired in 2002. Chairs have included several notable Canadians.

The centre was established at Cornwallis Park, in southern Nova Scotia, using facilities made available by the closure of CFB Cornwallis. Offices were later opened in Montréal, Ottawa and Halifax. Headquarters of the centre were moved during the Harper administration to the Ottawa office in 2008 while most of the operations remained in Cornwallis Park. The Montréal office was closed in 2008 and Halifax wound down by 2010.

As financial support to the centre was progressively withdrawn by the Federal government of Stephen Harper, operations were reduced and transferred to the Ottawa office. The centre's Cornwallis park facilities formally closed in 2011.

The name was formally changed to the "Pearson Centre" in 2012.

On September 26, 2013, the Pearson Centre announced it would be winding down its operations and closing its doors. Operations ceased with the final closure of the office November 28, 2013.

== Senior management ==
=== William Morrison, founder ===
William Alexander Morrison, MSC, CD, (1941– ) was born in Sydney, Nova Scotia, he is a graduate of Xavier Junior College and a historian. He received a Bachelor of Arts degree in 1968 from Mount Allison University. He joined the Canadian Forces in 1959 and retired as a lieutenant colonel in 1990. From 1980 to 1982, he was an instructor at the Royal Military College of Canada where he taught an undergraduate course in Canadian Military History. He was awarded his MSC in 1989. He was the 2002 recipient of the Pearson Medal of Peace, which is awarded for an individual's "contribution to international service."

From 1983 to 1989, Morrison was the military advisor to the Canadian permanent representative to the UN. He was vice-chairman of UN Peacekeeping Committee. From 1989 to 1997, he was the executive director of the Canadian Institute of Strategic Studies; and in 1994, he became the founding president of the Pearson Centre.

=== At closure ===
Philip Murray was chairman and Kevin McGarr president at the time of the centre's closure in 2013.

== The Pearson Papers ==
The Pearson Papers were a Canadian peacekeeping press publications compiled by the Pearson Peacekeeping Centre for over 15 years. They were:

- Pearson Paper 1: Public Information Campaigns in Peacekeeping: The UN Experience in Haiti; by Ingrid Lehmann
  - In this, the first of The Pearson Papers, Ingrid Lehmann explores "the development of Public Information Campaigns [in Haiti], both civil and military, from 1994 to 1996. The main innovation of the United Nations Mission in Haiti (UNMIH) was the introduction of the Military Information Support Teams (MIST)." MIST operations over three different phases of the peacekeeping mission in Haiti are examined: the initial deployments to Haiti as part of Operation Uphold Democracy; UNMIH under United States leadership; and, UNMIH under Canadian leadership.
- Pearson Paper 2: The Level Killing Fields of Yugoslavia: An Observer Returns; by James V. Arbuckle
  - In the second of The Pearson Papers, James Arbuckle provides a lucid and personal account of the post-conflict situation in the former Yugoslavia. The author comments on the implementation of the Dayton Peace Accords and analyzes the prospects for future peace in the region, through the prism of his considerable experience in military peacekeeping.
- Pearson Paper 3: African Peacekeepers: Partners or Proxies?; by Eric G. Berman and Katie Sams
  - In this book, the third of The Pearson Papers, Eric G. Berman and Katie E. Sams examine current efforts to develop African peacekeeping and peace enforcement capabilities. They describe various Western and African capacity-building initiatives and attempts to resolve conflicts in Africa. Drawing on numerous interviews with policy makers and practitioners, they reveal the incongruities between Western “largesse” and African needs. Berman and Sams conclude that despite current Western and African efforts, the factors resulting in inaction four years ago in Rwanda still persist.
- Pearson Paper 4: Intelligence In Peacekeeping: The Cloak and the Blue Beret: The Limits of Intelligence-Gathering in UN Peacekeeping; by Walter Dorn and Out of the Closet: Intelligence Support for Post-Modern Peacekeeping; by David Charters
  - This Pearson Paper contains two distinct chapters by two separate authors both dealing with the topic of Intelligence in Peacekeeping. Dorn looks at the United Nations’ view of “intelligence,” its reluctance to utilize and that exact terminology. Dorn explores how intelligence is an essential part of UN peacekeeping. Charters’ central argument is that post-Cold War conflicts have changed dramatically the character of peacekeeping operations, and that the change will now require peacekeepers to apply the full range of intelligence capabilities in order to bring such conflicts under control.
- Pearson Paper 5: The Laws of War and The Rules of Peace: Why Traditional Legal Models Do Not Work; by Thomas B. Baines
  - In this the fifth of The Pearson Papers, Thomas Baines presents some operational, moral and ethical challenges that arise in the context of non-traditional military operations. As well, he proposes some institutional formalisms to help limit the potential negative consequences of dealing with these challenges. His analysis and recommendations are framed for military policy makers and field commanders, rather than policy makers and executives of the other parties that may be involved in the types of missions discussed.
- Pearson Paper 6: Confronting Rwandan Genocide: The Military Options What Could and Should the International Community Have Done?; by Douglas Anglin
  - In this the sixth of The Pearson Papers, this essay explores promising courses of action that, given the necessary political will, would have been militarily feasible and morally justifiable. It assesses realistically their prospects of success in checking the haemorrhage in Rwandan lives and identifies the circumstances and significance of the opportunities missed. Particular attention is paid to the time frame as, with each day's delay, thousands of additional people died. As the scale of the ethnic killing became evident, demands mounted that “something must be done”. Yet, little serious thought was paid to what that “something” realistically might be. Meaningful military intervention would have proved problematic. The operational constraints on intervening rapidly and effectively in the middle of Africa in a country with limited infrastructure could not be dismissed as insignificant — or insurmountable.
- Pearson Paper 7: The 1999 United Nations and 2000 Organizations of African Unity Formal Inquiries: A Retrospective Examination of Peacekeeping and the Rwandan Crisis of 1994; by Terry M. Mays
  - This the seventh Pearson Paper, takes a different approach in analyzing the peacekeeping related failures within Rwanda and the United Nations headquarters. In 1999, the United Nations initiated the Report of the Independent Inquiry into the Actions of the United Nations During the 1994 Genocide in Rwanda. The following year the Organization of African Unity (OAU) opted to conduct its own independent investigation and established the International Panel of Eminent Personalities to Investigate the 1994 Genocide in Rwanda and the Surrounding Events. This essay utilizes these independent investigations as the foundation for a review of the peacekeeping failure in Rwanda. Several factors for failure can be identified from the UN and OAU investigations and each is explored in this study. The essay also examines whether the 2,000-member UN peacekeeping operation on the ground in Rwanda could have halted the genocide if the political will existed to accomplish the task. Five options for the future are reviewed and a postscript includes a brief discussion on the relationship of state sovereignty and humanitarian intervention as seen through the International Commission on Intervention and State Sovereignty.
- Pearson Paper 8: Lessons Learned on UNMIK Judiciary; by Mark Baskin
  - This study was designed to review the experience of the United Nations Interim Administration Mission in Kosovo (UNMIK) with judiciary capacity building. UNMIK is significant both because Kosovo is a linchpin of Balkan politics and diplomacy, and because it provides a laboratory for deriving lessons for future efforts at post-conflict governance and administration. The goal of the study was to enable policy makers to “learn the lessons of capacity building for a judiciary as a part of the mandate of a peace support cooperation if similar work in the future is to be more effective”. A direct result of this study, Pearson Paper 8, Lessons Learned on UNMIK Judiciary describes problems at each stage of judiciary building, how they were addressed, how they could have been addressed more effectively, and what changes would facilitate such improvements. After outlining the broader context in which the development of Kosovo's judicial system takes place, this assessment will describe chronological developments in the judiciary. It then turns to broader themes and patterns in the establishment of the judiciary by focusing on the specific challenges that most characterized the development of the judiciary at each stage and to some underlying patterns in the development of Kosovo's judiciary and concludes with some suggestions – both for the future of Kosovo's judiciary and in other post-conflict administrations, as well.
- Pearson Paper 9: On Issues and Initiatives: The International Red Cross in Times of Duress and Ambiguity
  - This volume focuses on issues specific to the International Red Cross.
- Pearson Paper 10: Measures of Effectiveness: Peace Operations and Beyond; Ann Livingstone, PhD, Editor, Aleisha Arnusch, MA, Managing Editor
  - This volume contains diverse approaches to measurement and even differing conceptualizations of what peace operations today consist of, including those that go ‘beyond’ the traditional notion of peacekeeping.
- Pearson Paper 11 (spring): Challenges of Effective Cooperation and Coordination in Peace Operations; Ann Livingstone, Ph.D., Editor, Kristine St-Pierre, M.A., Managing Editor
  - This volume considers the challenges of coordinating military, police and humanitarian actors, sometimes sharing but more often, co-habiting a common space in complex peace operations. Faced with diverse perspectives, lack of clarity regarding roles and responsibilities, and the need to identify lessons learned, they are finding new and innovative ways to collaborate and synchronize their actions.
- Pearson Paper 11 (fall): Opportunities for Enhancing Cooperation and Coordination in Peace Operations; Ann Livingstone, Ph.D., Editor, Kristine St-Pierre, M.A., Managing Editor
  - This volume builds on the integration described in the previous volume. It presents four ways of thinking about integration in the context of peace operations specifically and peace and security generally. Beyond simply acknowledging the need for greater cooperation and coordination in peace and security, the articles present different rationales and approaches for enhancing cooperation and coordination using examples from Africa, Asia and Latin America.
- Pearson Paper 12: Environmental Considerations for Building Peace; Ann Livingstone, Ph.D., Editor, Kristine St-Pierre, M.A., Managing Editor
  - This study considers not only the logistical nature of geography in disputes, but also environmental health impacts. For example, when water contains metals, such as lead, consumers are less rational in their deliberations and more violent.

As of 2013 the papers are no longer published.
