= Rule of man =

Type of personal rule

Rule of man (Note: also rule of men; differentiated from rule by man or rule by men; consider "rule of persons" or "rule by person"; consider "rule of an individual" or "rule of individuals"; consider "government of men" as opposed to "government of laws"; not to be confused with "rule of people" in relation to a democracy or China.) (where "man" is used in a genderless manner) is a type of personal rule in an unaccountable society where rules change from ruler to ruler. It is a society in which one person, regime, or a group of persons, rules arbitrarily. While rule of man can be explained as the absence of rule of law, this theoretical understanding results in a paradox. Realism dictates that man and law do not stand apart and that the rules of each are not opposites. Rather law depends deeply on a state composed of men.

On the other hand, as a positive concept, the rule of man, "a man capable of ruling better than the best laws", was championed in ancient Greek philosophy and thinking as early as Plato. The debate between rule of man versus rule of law extends to Plato's student Aristotle, and to Confucius and the Legalists in Chinese philosophy.

== Negative associations ==
Rule of man is associated with numerous negative concepts such as tyranny, dictatorship and despotism, and their variations that have taken the form of the Thirty Tyrants, the Jacobin dictatorship (Reign of Terror) during the French Revolution, Caesarism, Bonapartism and spiritual gift politics (also known as charismatic power), and regimes like Joseph Stalin and the Communist Party of the Soviet Union, and Adolf Hitler and the NSDAP. Bad government is considered inherent to personal rule. Despite theoretical associations of what constitutes a bad or good government, political realism dictates that rules will be established irrespective of the rulers being dictatorial or democratic, one or many.

== Rule of man vs. rule of law ==
=== As independent and oppositional notions ===
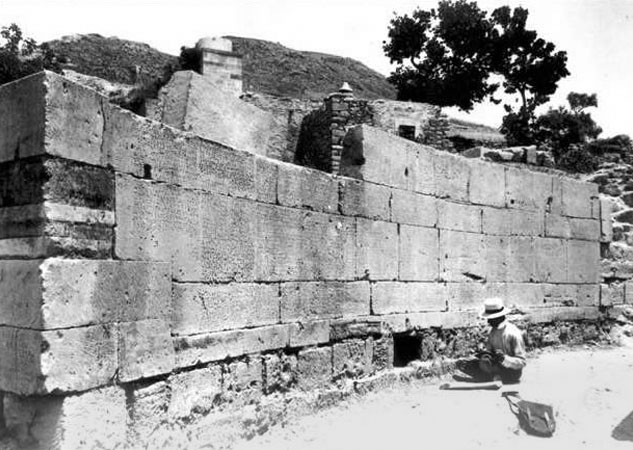
Archeologist Federico Halbherr at Gortyn (Crete, Greece), deciphering Gortys law code (inscription on the circular wall). As opposed to the rule of man, the rule of law, is "the principle whereby all members of a society (including those in government) are considered equally subject to publicly disclosed legal codes and processes". Oxford English Dictionary

Aristotle associated individual rule to the absence of reason, to be animal-like, "to invest law then with authority is, it seems, to invest God and reason only; to invest a man is to introduce a beast, as desire is something bestial, and even the best of men in authority are liable to be corrupted by passion. We may conclude then that the law is reason without passion and is therefore preferable to any individual." However Plato, Aristotle's teacher, had championed the rule of man, "an exceptional figure, capable of ruling better than the best laws". The Sovereign exercises absolute authority and is not bound by any law, he as a person exists outside law; the philosopher Thomas Hobbes advocated such a society (including in his book Leviathan), saying that a society would be better if it had one absolute monarch as he would be free to choose and do what he thinks is best for the society without taking into account the opinions of others.

James Harrington would go on to pen the phrase "a government of laws and not of men" in 1656, which in turn found its way into the Constitution of Massachusetts where John Adams was the principal author. In the 1803 Marbury v. Madison U.S. Supreme Court case, Chief Justice John Marshall wrote "The government of the United States has been emphatically termed a government of laws, and not of men." In 1977, a former Supreme Court of India judge, Hans Raj Khanna, stated in a speech,

Ever since the beginning of civilisation, two conflicting viewpoints, rule of men or rule of law, have competed for acceptance. Although each school of thought has not lacked in its votaries, in the aggregate the thinking has been in favour of the rule of law. On occasions we have slipped back into government by will only to return again sadder and wiser to the rule of law when hard facts of human nature demonstrated the selfishness and egotism of man and the truth of the dictum that power corrupts and absolute power corrupts absolutely. Rule of law is now the accepted norm in all civilised societies. Even if there have been deviations from the rule of law, such deviations have been covert and disguised, for no government in a civilised country is prepared to accept the ignominy of governing without the rule of law.

— Justice Hans Raj Khanna, 1977

Countries such as China have developed and transitioned from 'rule of man' to 'rule by law', and finally to 'rule of law' from the 1970s onwards. During the cultural revolution in China Mao Zedong was quoted as saying "Depend on the rule of man, not the rule of law"; however by the 1970s Mao started advocating a law-based society in theory. However similar concepts had their own origins in China as early as 536 BC, when Zi Chan attempted to make law less arbitrary and more permanent by getting it inscribed and put on public display. Renzhi, translated by western scholars as 'rule of man', could be better explained as 'rule of people'.

Absence of rule of law implies the absence of a legislature, judiciary, and a legal administrative and enforcement system. On the other hand, rule of man is associated with the lack of a legal system, that is, lawlessness.

=== As dependent and overlapping notions ===
Laws, and the rule of law, is not isolated from man and the rule of man. There are a number of overlaps between the rule of man and the rule of law. Considering the rule of law and rule of man as independent opposites results in a paradox as law occurs within a state, and not independently.

Central to the operation of the rule of law ... was a conceptual framing of the 'rule of law' and the 'rule of man' as oppositional notions, a paradoxical framing suggesting in both India and China that law somehow stood apart from the realm of everyday power. Yet law was deeply dependent on the state (staffed by men), and on the operation of state power.

== See also ==
- Anomie
- List of forms of government
- Self-rule
