= Conviction =

Legal verdict

In law, a conviction is the determination by a court of law that a defendant is guilty of a crime. A conviction may follow a guilty plea that is accepted by the court, a jury trial in which a verdict of guilty is delivered, or a trial by judge in which the defendant is found guilty.

The opposite of a conviction is an acquittal (that is, "not guilty"). In Scotland, there can also be a verdict of "not proven", which is considered an acquittal. Sometimes, despite a defendant being found guilty, the court may order that the defendant not be convicted. This is known as a discharge and is used in countries including England, Wales, Canada, Australia, and New Zealand.

In any criminal justice system, innocent people are sometimes convicted. Appeal mechanisms and post conviction relief procedures may help to address this issue to some extent. An error leading to the conviction of an innocent person is known as a miscarriage of justice. In some judicial systems, the prosecution may appeal acquittals; while in others, this is prohibited under double jeopardy protections.

After a defendant is convicted, the court determines the appropriate sentence as a punishment. In addition to the sentence, a conviction can also have other consequences, known as collateral consequences of criminal charges. These can include impacts on employment, housing, the right to travel to other countries, and other areas of an individual's life.

A person's history of convictions is known as their antecedents or "previous" in the United Kingdom and "priors" in the United States and Australia.

== See also ==
- Convict
- Conviction rate
- Verdict
- Clearance rate
