= International Corrections and Prisons Association =

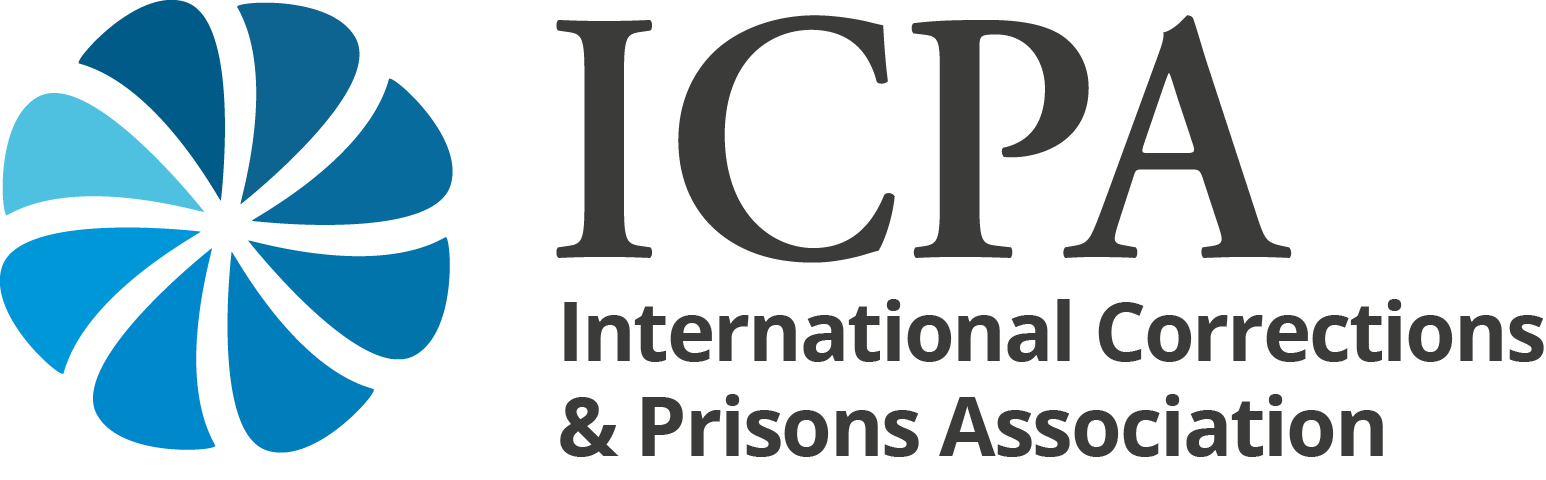
- Formation: 1998
- President: Peter Severin
- Executive Director: Manon Bisson
- Website: www.icpa.org

The International Corrections and Prisons Association (ICPA) is a not-for-profit association for prison professionals, based in Brussels, Belgium and founded in 1998. ICPA is a non-governmental organization in Special Consultative Status with the Economic and Social Council of the United Nations (ECOSOC).

The president is Peter Severin from Australia, and Peter van der Sande was previously president. It hosts an annual conference in a different city each year.
