= Crime clearance rate =

Proportion of crimes solved to crimes reported

In criminal justice, a clearance rate is a measure of how many crimes have been solved in a specific geographical region during a specific time period, usually given as a percentage. Various groups use clearance rates as a measure of crimes solved by the police.

== Formula ==
A clearance rate is calculated by dividing the number of crimes cleared by the total number of crimes reported and multiplying the result by 100. A crime is cleared when police make an arrest and a criminal charge has been laid or the case is otherwise closed, such as when police have enough evidence to make an arrest but cannot because the suspect is dead.

== Limitations ==
Clearance rates can be problematic for measuring the performance of police organizations and for comparing various police organizations. This is because police organizations may measure clearance rates differently. For example, each police organization may have a different method of recording when a "crime" has occurred and different criteria for determining when a crime has been "cleared." A given police organization may appear to have a much better clearance rate because of its calculation methodology.

Jerome Skolnick found that focusing on clearance rates encourages the police to focus on boosting clearance rates rather than investigating crimes impartially. Such focus on clearance rates may result in effort being expended to attribute crimes (correctly or incorrectly) to a criminal, which may not result in actual offenders being charged for their crimes.

== By country ==
Homicide clearance rate differs between countries, with around 98% in Finland and around 24% in Trinidad and Tobago, a direct comparison is limited due to differing definitions and criminal justice procedures.

Homicide Clearance
Country	Date of Homicides	Date of Publication of Study	Reported Clearance Rate for Homicides	Source
Brazil	2023-2024	2026	39%	O Globo
England & Wales		2012	85%	Liem
Estonia		2012	80%	Liem
Finland	2009-2014	2019	98%	Liem
France		2012	80%	Liem
Germany		2014	94%	Liem
Italy		2012	78%	Liem
Japan		2008	95%	Liem
Netherlands	2009-2014	2019	77%	Liem
New Zealand		2015	91%	Liem
South Korea		2008	96%	Liem
Sweden	2009-2013	2019	83%	Liem
Switzerland	2009-2014	2019	95%	Liem
Trinidad & Tobago		2010	24%	Liem
United States	2019		61%	FBI

=== United States ===
The U.S. has a low clearance rate—cases solved or arrests made. Murder clearance rates of Australia, Britain and Germany are in the 70s and 90s percent range, compared to the U.S. in the 50s.

The clearance rate for reported crimes varies by type of crime. For 2023 in the USA the arrest rate was 47.5% for murder, 42.9% for aggravated assault, 35.4% for shoplifting, 24.9% for robbery, 24.3% for embezzlement, 22.2% for arson, 12.0% for rape, 11.9% for burglary and 6.6% for motor vehicle theft.

Homicide clearance rate in the United States of America has been decreasing from 95% in 1962 to 54% in 2020. Some U.S. police forces have been criticized for overuse of "exceptional clearance", which is intended to classify as "cleared" cases where probable cause to arrest a suspect exists, but police are unable to do so for reasons outside their control (such as death or incarceration in a foreign country).

== See also ==
- CompStat
- Conviction
- Conviction rate
- Crime harm index
- Crime statistics
- Criminal investigation
- Dark figure of crime
- Fear of crime
- List of unsolved deaths
- Right to an effective remedy
- Under-reporting
