= Conviction rate =

Legal concept

The conviction rate, expressed as a percentage, is the proportion of criminal trials completed that deliver a verdict of guilt, a conviction, for an offense.

Conviction rates reflect many aspects of the legal processes and systems at work within the jurisdiction; high rates are a source of both jurisdictional pride and broad controversy. Rates are often high, especially when presented in their most general form (i.e., without qualification regarding changes made to original charges, pleas that are negotiated, etc.). Rates across jurisdictions within some countries can vary by tens of percentage points (e.g., across states within the U.S.). In other cases, they are uniformly high, e.g., in China, Japan, and Russia.

While conviction rates can be illustrative of the success of prosecutorial efforts, they also may depict the prevalence of Type I error (criminal conviction where the defendant is, in fact, not guilty). Judge James A. Shapiro and Northwestern University's Prof. Karl T. Muth suggest: "When jurors misapprehend how high the burden of proof beyond a reasonable doubt is, they are in danger of convicting the innocent, the gravest kind of mistake that is called 'Type I error.' When they let a guilty person go free, they commit a less serious kind of mistake called 'Type II error.' In fact, the theory behind proof beyond a reasonable doubt (letting several guilty people go free in order to save one innocent person) actually contemplates Type II error." This concept is not new; a ratio of 10 instances of Type II error (incorrect not guilty verdicts) for each instance of Type I error (erroneous convictions) is sometimes referred to as Blackstone's Ratio.

== Examples ==
=== Canada ===
In Canada, 2017–2018 data provided by Statistics Canada indicate an overall rate of conviction of 62% (of those charged in adult court). This is much lower than one might infer from the 3.6% acquittal rate because 1/3rd of the cases are withdrawn (either directly or indirectly via a "Crown Stay") before they reach a verdict. According to Canadian trial lawyer Kim Schofield, the effective conviction rate falls from 62% to approximately 50% if one excludes guilty pleas and deals.

=== China ===
In China, the conviction rate reached 99.975% in 2022, according to a Safeguard Defenders analysis of reports released by the Supreme People's Court and Supreme People's Procuratorate. NPR and The Economist reported overall conviction rates above 99%. In 2016, out of 1.2 million people tried, only 1,039 were found not guilty - an acquittal rate of around 0.08%. In 2013, the conviction rate reached 99.93%, with 825 people acquitted out of 1.16 million people put on trial. Several local protectorates in China have set a "zero acquittal policy," resulting in a negative performance evaluation for trials that end in acquittal. As a result, Chinese prosecutors tend to withdraw indictments at the pre-trial stage rather than risk acquittal.

=== India ===
The national conviction rate in India for offences of the Indian Penal Code is 64.3% in 2022, a statistic that varies state by state; the state with the highest conviction rate is Mizoram (96.7%), while the state with lowest rate is Assam (35.6%) in 2021. In 2022, the conviction rate of the Central Bureau of Investigation (CBI) stood at 74.59%. In 2023, the National Investigation Agency (NIA) had a conviction rate of 94.70%. From 2014 to 2023, the Enforcement Directorate (ED) achieved a conviction rate of 93.54%, securing convictions in 29 out of 31 cases that completed trial.

=== Israel ===
The conviction rate in Israel was reported in 2018 to be over 99%. Around 72% of trials end with a conviction on some charges and acquittal on others, while around 22% end with a conviction on all charges. These statistics do not include plea bargains and cases where the charges are withdrawn, which make up the vast majority of criminal cases.

The conviction rate of Palestinians in Israeli military courts in the West Bank is 99.74%.

=== Japan ===
The conviction rate is 99.3%. By only stating this high conviction rate it is often misunderstood as too high—however, this high conviction rate drops significantly when accounting for the fact that Japanese prosecutors drop roughly half the cases they are given. If measured in the same way, the United States' federal conviction rate would be 99.8%.

In Japan, unlike in some other democracies, arrests require permission of judges except for cases such as arresting someone while committing a crime. Only significant cases with sufficient evidence are subject to indictment, since becoming a party to a criminal trial imposes a burden on a suspect; Japan's indictment ratio is only 37%—“99.3%” is the percentage of convictions divided by the number of indictments, not the criminals. As such, the conviction rate is high.

=== Russia ===
In 2018, the gross conviction rate of criminal cases in Russia was 76%, in 2023 it was 78%. In 2018, 0.25% of court cases ended in acquittal, compared with 0.3% in 2017 and 0.54% in 2014. Jury trials, where not guilty verdicts are more common, are rare. However this statistic does not take into account the 22–25% of cases that get dismissed prematurely. Instead, the Russian statistics consider the number of convictions out of the cases that have made it to the end, not being dismissed in the process. This is unlike other countries, where all non-convictions, including dismissals and acquittals, are combined into one statistic.

=== United Kingdom ===
The United Kingdom of Great Britain and Northern Ireland has three prosecuting bodies that cover different geographic areas. The Crown Office and Procurator Fiscal Service for Scotland. In Northern Ireland Public Prosecution Service for Northern Ireland (PPSNI) and in England and Wales most prosecutions are brought by the Crown Prosecution Service (CPS). More serious cases are tried in a Crown Court, typically by juries and judges, less serious ones in a Magistrates' Court, by magistrates. The figures for 2017–2018 in England and Wales show a conviction rate at Crown Courts of 80.0%, and 84.8% at Magistrates' Courts. In Northern Ireland figures show at Crown Court the conviction rate for 2017–2018 was 87.2% and at Magistrates Court it was 79.0%.

=== United States ===
In the United States federal court system, the conviction rate rose from approximately 75 percent to approximately 85% between 1972 and 1992. For 2012, the US Department of Justice reported a 93% conviction rate. In 2000, the conviction rate was also high in U.S. state courts. Coughlan, writing in 2000, stated, "In recent years, the conviction rate has averaged approximately 84% in Texas, 82% in California, 72% in New York, 67% in North Carolina, and 59% in Florida."

In 2018, the Bureau of Justice Statistics reported that among defendants charged with a felony, 68% were convicted (59% of a felony and the remainder of a misdemeanor) with felony conviction rates highest for defendants originally charged with motor vehicle theft (74%), driving-related offenses (73%), murder (70%), burglary (69%), and drug trafficking (67%); and lowest for defendants originally charged with assault (45%).

There are frequent "guilty acceptance" plea deals in the United States. That said, the ostensible "conviction rate" may not be accurate because the charges are dropped or reduced.

== See also ==
- Clearance rate
- Diversion program
