= Utah's congressional districts =

Map of Utah's congressional districts as ordered by the Third District Court of Utah on November 10, 2025 and will be used starting at the 2026 House elections pending legal appeals Interactive map version

Map of Utah's congressional districts used in the 2022 and 2024 elections. Interactive map version

Utah is divided into four congressional districts, each represented by a member of the United States House of Representatives. After the 2010 census, Utah gained one House seat, and a new map was approved by the state legislature and signed into law by Governor Gary Herbert.

== Legal proceedings ==
Utah’s congressional districts were an example of partisan gerrymandering. Republican lawmakers drew the boundaries to dilute the Democratic vote by splitting Democratic-leaning Salt Lake County across all four congressional districts.

In 2018, voters narrowly approved Proposition 4, which required districts be drawn by an independent redistricting commission. The legislature attempted to override Proposition 4, however state courts ruled in League of Women Voters v. Utah State Legislature that it did not have the constitutional right to do so.. In accordance with the ruling, the state legislature had to redraw Utah's congressional districts before the 2026 House Elections. They attempted to do so, however their redrawn map was rejected on November 10, 2025 by a state judge, who instead selected a map proposed by the League of Women Voters of Utah and Mormon Women for Ethical Government. The map places most of Salt Lake County into the same district, giving the 1st district a Democratic lean.

== Current representatives ==
The delegation has a total of four members, all Republicans.

Current U.S. representatives from Utah
District	Member (Residence)	Party	Incumbent since	CPVI (2026)	District map
1st	Blake Moore (Salt Lake City)	Republican	January 3, 2021	D+12	
2nd	Celeste Maloy (Cedar City)	Republican	November 28, 2023	R+15	
3rd	Mike Kennedy (Alpine)	Republican	January 3, 2025	R+21	
4th	Burgess Owens (Salt Lake City)	Republican	January 3, 2021	R+17	

== Historical and present district boundaries ==
Table of United States congressional district boundary maps in the State of Utah, presented chronologically. All redistricting events that took place in Utah between 1973 and 2013 are shown.

Year	Statewide map	Salt Lake City highlight
1973–1982		
1983–1992		
1993–2002		
2003–2013		
2013–2023		
2023–2027		
2027-2033		

== Redistricting ballot measures ==
- 2018 Utah Proposition 4, a measure that would require the redistricting process to be done by a bipartisan commission. This motion was passed by a margin of 0.68% however the Commission’s power "was stripped a year and a half later by the Legislature," as described by Sam Metz of the Associated Press, resulting in a lengthy legal battle.
- 2008 Utah Legislative Redistricting Requirement, Amendment D, a technical proposal that allowed the legislature to consider redistricting once census data was made public. Passed by a margin of 56.50%.

== Obsolete districts ==
- Utah Territory's at-large congressional district
- Utah's at-large congressional district

== See also ==
- Utah's congressional delegations
- List of United States congressional districts
- Utah State Legislative districts
