= Electoral reform in Utah =

Electoral reform in Utah includes legislative and procedural changes intended to modify the state's electoral processes. These reforms have addressed issues such as voter identification, ballot initiatives, voting methods, and election administration.

== Early voting rights and women's suffrage ==
Women in the Utah Territory gained the right to vote in 1870, lost it under the federal Edmunds–Tucker Act in 1887, and regained it with statehood in 1896. The Utah Constitutional Convention of 1895 included women's suffrage in the state constitution, making Utah one of the first US states to grant women the right to vote.

== Voter ID laws and voting methods ==
Utah has taken an evolving approach to electoral processes, experimenting with voting methods and requirements.

The Count My Vote initiative of 2014 aimed to replace Utah's caucus system with a direct primary. A compromise led to Senate Bill 54, creating a dual-path system allowing candidates to qualify for the ballot via party conventions or signature gathering. This hybrid system remains in place, balancing traditional caucuses with broader voter participation.

The Municipal Alternate Voting Methods Pilot Project, initiated by the Utah State Legislature in 2018 through HB35, permits municipalities to adopt Instant-runoff voting (IRV), also known as ranked-choice voting (RCV). While initial adoption was limited, by 2021, 23 cities participated, But due to administrative complexities and voter confusion, participation declined to 12 cities by 2023. Utah legislators then introduced House Bill 176, titled Municipal Voting Methods Amendments, which proposed allowing municipalities to adopt approval voting as an alternative to RCV, citing its relative simplicity. As of May 2025, there has been no further action on the bill following referral to the House Rules Committee.

In March 2025, Governor Spencer Cox signed into law House Bill 300, a measure aimed at modifying the state's postal voting procedures. The law

- phases out the state's universal vote-by-mail system by 2029
- removes the three-day grace period for mail ballots that arrive after Election Day
- requires that mail ballots be received (not postmarked) by 8:00 pm on Election Day
- replaces the current signature verification system with a requirement for voters to include the last four digits of their state identification card or Social Security number on mail-in ballot envelopes
- requires proactively requesting mail-in ballots every eight years to continue receiving them, beginning in 2029. While the bill initially mandated in-person ballot returns with photo ID, revisions removed this requirement. Several county clerks have expressed concerns that the new measures could complicate election administration and potentially disenfranchise voters unfamiliar with the updated procedures.

== Ballot initiatives and constitutional amendments ==
In 2018, Utah voters approved Proposition 4, establishing an independent redistricting commission to combat gerrymandering. The legislature later passed SB 200, modifying the proposition's provisions. In 2024, in League of Women Voters v. Utah State Legislature, the Utah Supreme Court ruled that the legislature could not unilaterally alter voter-approved initiatives, reinforcing the power of citizen initiatives.

In 2025, the Utah State Legislature proposed two significant changes to the ballot initiative process:

- Senate Joint Resolution 2 (SJR2): This resolution seeks to amend the Constitution of Utah. If approved by voters in 2026, it would require that ballot initiatives proposing new taxes or tax increases receive at least 60% approval to take effect, rather than a simple majority.
- Senate Bill 73 (SB73): Passed by the legislature, SB73 mandates that ballot summaries be impartial and accurate and outlines procedures for challenging and revising flawed summaries. Proponents believe these provisions will enhance clarity and fairness in ballot language, reducing judicial overreach in rewriting summaries. Opponents argue that it could undermine the impartiality of ballot measure summaries by granting the legislature increased control over their content, leading to biased or misleading summaries, potentially influencing voter perception and outcomes. Critics also claim that the bill's provisions could limit judicial oversight in ensuring the fairness and accuracy of ballot language.

== Election oversight and administration ==
In 2025, Utah lawmakers proposed significant changes to election oversight:

- House Bill 369, a proposal to transfer election oversight from the lieutenant governor to an independent elections office appointed by a committee of county clerks. Although the stated purpose was to increase voter confidence in election integrity, a Sutherland Institute poll found that 45% of Utah voters polled said their confidence in election integrity would decrease if the state director overseeing elections was appointed instead of elected. Just 15% said the change would increase their confidence.
- House Bill 332, a measure to withdraw Utah from the Electronic Registration Information Center (ERIC), a nonprofit consortium that assists member states in improving the accuracy of voter rolls, passed the Utah House in February 2025. If passed by the Senate and signed into law by the governor, the measure would make Utah the latest of 10 Republican-led states to withdraw from the program.
- House Bill 445, a proposal to eliminate same-day voter registration, requiring voters to register a full month before Election Day. The stated purposes of the bill included expediting election results reporting and enhancing public confidence in election integrity.
- House Bill 263 (Election Records Amendment) updates procedures for maintaining and accessing election records, purportedly to enhance transparency and efficiency, implements measures to ensure public access to cast vote records and adjusts the duration and methods for retaining various election-related documents to comply with updated standards. In March 2025, 28 of the 29 county clerks in the state signed a letter urging Governor Cox to veto the bill.

== See also ==
- Elections in Utah
- Voter identification laws in the United States
- Redistricting in the United States
- Approval voting
