= Thomas Rex Lee =

American judge (born 1964)

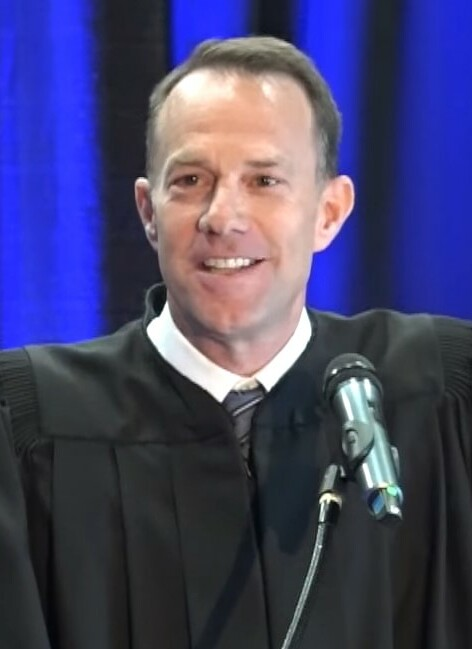

Associate Justice of the Utah Supreme Court
- In office July 19, 2010 – June 30, 2022
- Appointed by: Gary Herbert
- Preceded by: Michael J. Wilkins
- Succeeded by: Jill Pohlman

Personal details
- Born: December 28, 1964 (age 61)
- Party: Republican
- Spouse: Kimberly Lee
- Relations: Mike Lee (brother)
- Children: 6
- Parent: Rex E. Lee
- Education: Brigham Young University (BA); University of Chicago (JD)

Thomas Rex Lee (born December 28, 1964) is an American jurist who was a justice of the Utah Supreme Court from 2010 to 2022. Lee is also a lecturer at Harvard Law School and an adjunct professor/distinguished lecturer at Brigham Young University's (BYU) J. Reuben Clark Law School (JRCL) following his appointment to the bench.

Lee is a pioneer in law and corpus linguistics—the application of corpus linguistics to determine ordinary meaning in statutes—being the first American judge to do so in an opinion.

== Early life and education ==
Thomas Rex Lee was born in 1964 to Janet (née Griffin) and Rex E. Lee. He grew up in Arizona, Utah, and Northern Virginia. Lee attended Brigham Young University, graduating in 1988 with a Bachelor of Arts summa cum laude in economics. He then attended the University of Chicago Law School, where he was an editor of the University of Chicago Law Review and graduated in 1991 with a J.D. degree with high honors.

After law school, Lee clerked for J. Harvie Wilkinson III of the U.S. Court of Appeals for the Fourth Circuit from 1991 to 1992. He then entered private practice at the Salt Lake City-based law firm of Kimball, Parr, Waddoups, Brown & Gee, taking a one-year leave of absence to serve as a law clerk for Justice Clarence Thomas of the U.S. Supreme Court from 1994 to 1995.

== Career ==
After his Supreme Court clerkship, Lee entered private practice at the Salt Lake City law firm Kimball, Parr, Waddoups, Brown & Gee. He left the firm in 1997 to join the faculty at BYU's JRCL. At the law school, Lee taught courses in Civil Procedure and Intellectual Property Law, and a seminar on the United States Supreme Court. He also served as Associate Dean (2008-2010) and was named the Rex and Maureen Rawlinson Professor of Law. Following his 2010 appointment to the bench Lee remained a Distinguished Lecturer in Law at the JRCL.

During his years as a full-time law professor, Lee was also of counsel at Howard, Phillips, & Andersen, handling intellectual property litigation. He was counsel in multiple trademark infringement cases brought by or against automobile manufacturers such as General Motors and Ford Motor Company. He also developed a part-time appellant practice, arguing numerous cases in federal courts throughout the country and in the United States Supreme Court.

Lee took leave of the JRCL from 2004 to 2005 to serve as Deputy Assistant Attorney General in the Civil Division of the United States Justice Department. While at the JRCL, from 2002 to 2004, Lee also served as the lead counsel in cases brought by the state of Utah in relation to plans to put nuclear waste on the Goshute Indian Reservation.

=== Utah Supreme Court ===
On May 28, 2010, Utah Governor Gary Herbert nominated Lee to fill the vacancy in the Utah Supreme Court left by the retirement of Michael J. Wilkins. Receiving a unanimous vote (5–0) from the Utah Senate Judicial Confirmation Committee in mid-June 2010, Lee was confirmed by the full Senate on June 23, 2010. Lee was sworn into office on July 19, 2010; his mentor, U.S. Supreme Court Justice Clarence Thomas, administered the oath. On January 19, 2022, Lee sent a letter to Governor Spencer Cox, informing him that he would be resigning, effective July 31, 2022. His stated reason was "to pursue other opportunities in the legal profession.". However, Lee ended up retiring from the court on June 30, 2022.

==== Authorship of opinions ====
Lee has been a prolific judicial writer. An empirical study of Utah Supreme Court opinions by political scientist, Adam Brown, found that in the approximately first three years on the court, Lee authored more opinions than any other justice over the 16-year period studied, writing some form of opinion (whether majority, dissenting, or concurring) in 43% of the opinions published while he was a justice.

"Whereas some justices release a concurring or dissenting opinion in only a handful of cases that they hear," Lee is a prolific writer of such opinions, releasing them in around 16% of the Court's opinions. Of the ten Utah Supreme justices who served on the court from 1997 to 2012, Lee has the second-highest rate of dissent, filing dissenting opinions in 10% of cases over this time period. (The justice with the highest dissent rate was I. Daniel Stewart, who dissented 11% of the time). Lee also authored the highest proportion of majority opinions of the court (27%); Brown wrote that "[g]iven that Lee dissents relatively frequently, it is remarkable that he is also the most common author of majority opinions. His willingness to dissent has apparently not alienated his colleagues."

=== Post-court career ===
After stepping down from the Utah Supreme Court, Lee launched two national firms: Lee Nielsen, a boutique litigation firm with offices in Utah and D.C.; and Corpus Juris Advisors, a consulting firm performing linguistic and survey analysis for issues of legal interpretation (contracts, statutes, and constitutions), intellectual property (trademarks and patent claim construction), defamation, and false advertising.

== Jurisprudence ==
A 2016 paper written by Jeremy Kidd of the Mercer University Walter F. George School of Law and others attempted to measure the "Scalia-ness" of various potential nominees to the Supreme Court to fill the seat left vacant by Antonin Scalia's death. The study created a "Scalia Index Score" combining the various measures of "Scalia-ness," and Lee scored highest. The study found that Lee was the most likely to endorse or engage in originalism in judicial opinions, was second most likely to cite Scalia's non-judicial writings in opinions, and the third most likely to write separately when not writing the majority opinion. The study was updated again in 2018, adding new variables and more names, and Lee again scored the highest.

In a 2016 article, John McGinnis, of the Northwestern University School of Law, argued that Lee was similar to Scalia in being "capable of pressing the intellectual case for following the Constitution as written" because of Lee "has pioneered the application of corpus linguistics to law," and further wrote that if elevated to the U.S. Supreme Court, "Lee would create a transmission belt from the best work of originalists in the academy to the Supreme Court."

Hannah Clayson Smith, writing in the National Review, praised Lee as a possible successor to Scalia because of Lee's similar jurisprudential style to the late Justice, but noted that with respect to Lee's views on judicial precedent, "Justice Lee is more like Justice Thomas than like Justice Scalia." Smith noted that Lee (like Thomas) has repeatedly advocated for overruling precedent that he views as "contrary to the original meaning of the Utah constitution," even if precedent takes a different approach.

== Works ==
Title	Publication
Data-Driven Originalism	University of Pennsylvania Law Review, Vol. 167, pp. 261-335, 2019
Judging Ordinary Meaning	Yale Law Journal, Vol. 127, pp. 788-1105, 2018
Corpus Linguistics & Original Public Meaning: A New Tool To Make Originalism More Empirical	Yale Law Journal Forum, Vol. 126, pp. 21–32, 2016
Trademarks, Consumer Psychology, and the Sophisticated Consumer	Emory Law Journal, Vol. 57, pp. 575-650, 2008
Demystifying Dilution	Boston University Law Review, Vol. 84, pp. 859–944, 2004
The Original Understanding of the Census Clause: Statistical Estimates and the Constitutional Requirement of an 'Actual Enumeration'	Washington Law Review, Vol. 77, pp. 1–64, 2002
Preliminary Injunctions and the Status Quo	Washington & Lee Law Review, Vol. 58, pp. 109–166, 2001
The Anastasoff Case and the Judicial Power to "Unpublish" Opinions	Notre Dame Law Review, Vol. 77, pp. 135–173, 2001
In Rem Jurisdiction in Cyberspace	75 Wash. L. Rev 97 (2000)
Stare Decisis in Historical Perspective: From the Founding Era to the Rehnquist Court	Vanderbilt Law Review, Vol. 52, pp. 647–735, 1999
Pleading and Proof: The Economics of Legal Burdens	Brigham Young University Law Review, Vol. 1997, pp. 1–34, 1997
Comment: The Standing of Qui Tam Relators Under the False Claims Act	University of Chicago Law Review, Vol. 57, pp. 543–571, 1990

== Personal life ==
Lee and his wife, Kimberly, have six children. His brother, Mike Lee, is a U.S. Senator representing the state of Utah. He is the son of Rex E. Lee, a former Solicitor General of the United States and the 10th president of BYU.

== See also ==
- Donald Trump Supreme Court candidates
- List of law clerks for the tenth seat of the Supreme Court of the United States

Legal offices
Preceded by Michael Wilkins	Associate Justice of the Utah Supreme Court; 2010–2022	Succeeded by Jill Pohlman
