= 1992 Utah gubernatorial election =

- November 3, 1992
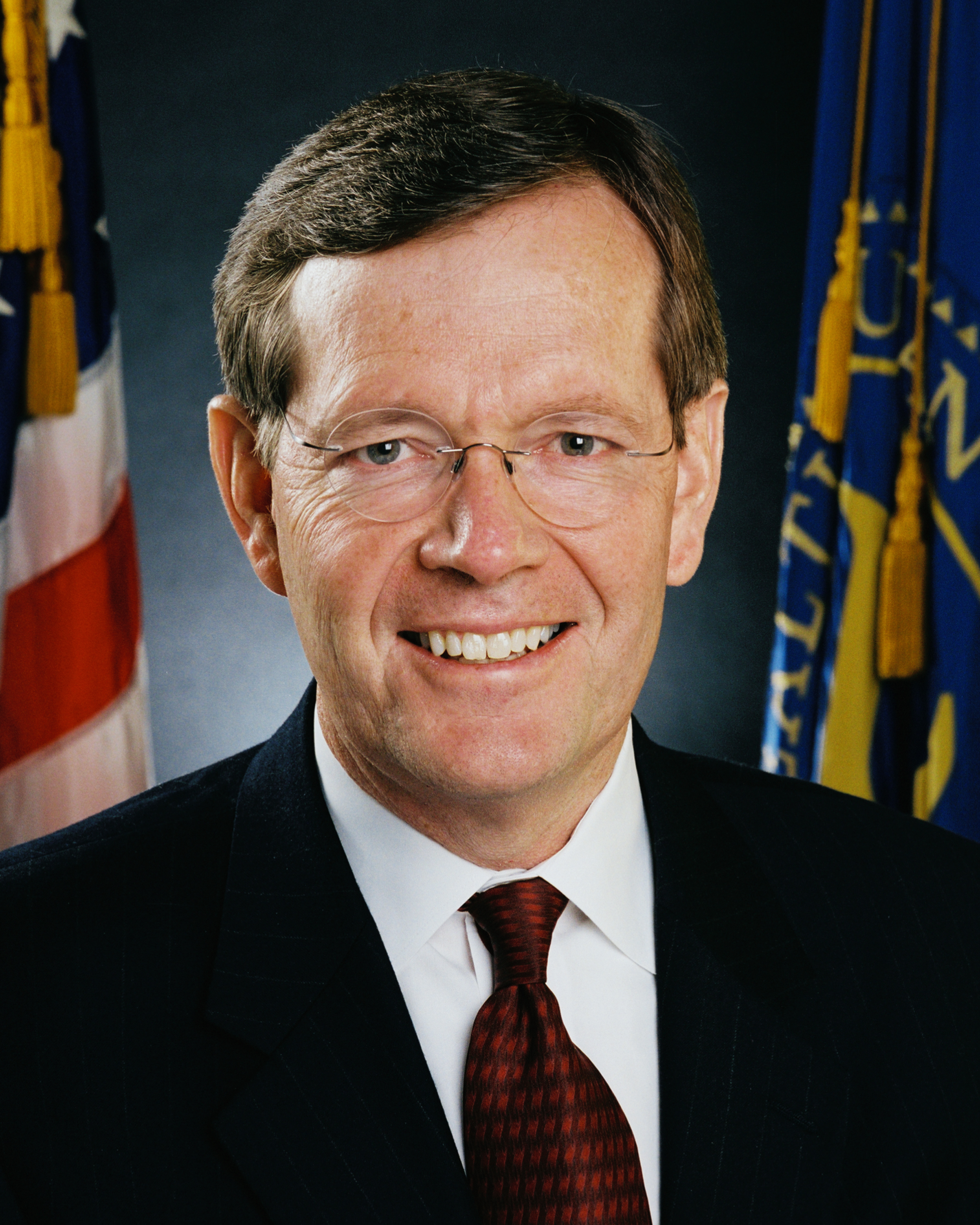

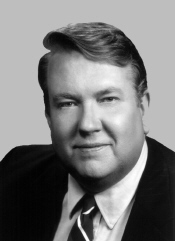

| Nominee | Mike Leavitt | Merrill Cook | Stewart Hanson |
| Party | Republican | Independent | Democratic |
| Running mate | Olene Walker | Frances H. Merrill | Paula Julander |
| Popular vote | 321,713 | 255,753 | 177,181 |
| Percentage | 42.19% | 33.54% | 23.23% |
- County results Leavitt: 30–40% 40–50% 50–60% 60–70% Cook: 30–40% Hanson: 30–40% 40–50%
Governor before election
Norman Bangerter
Republican
Elected Governor
Mike Leavitt
Republican

The 1992 Utah gubernatorial election took place on November 3, 1992. Republican nominee Michael Leavitt won the three-way election.

== Primary election ==
Primary elections were held on September 8, 1992.

=== Republican primary ===
==== Candidates ====
- Richard M. Eyre, author
- Mike Leavitt, CEO of the Leavitt Group

==== Results ====
Republican primary results
| Party | Candidate | Votes | % |
|---|---|---|---|
| Republican | Mike Leavitt | 143,647 | 56.00% |
| Republican | Richard M. Eyre | 112,881 | 44.00% |
| Total votes | | 256,528 | 100.00% |

=== Democratic primary ===
==== Candidates ====
- Stewart Hanson, attorney
- Pat Shea, attorney

==== Results ====
Democratic primary results
| Party | Candidate | Votes | % |
|---|---|---|---|
| Democratic | Stewart Hanson | 64,084 | 56.79% |
| Democratic | Pat Shea | 48,758 | 43.21% |
| Total votes | | 112,842 | 100.00% |

=== Independent American primary ===
==== Candidates ====
- Frank W. Richins
- Lawrence Rey Topham

==== Results ====
Independent American primary results
| Party | Candidate | Votes | % |
|---|---|---|---|
| Independent American | Frank W. Richins | 770 | 67.66% |
| Independent American | Lawrence Rey Topham | 368 | 32.34% |
| Total votes | | 1,138 | 100.00% |

== General election ==
=== Candidates ===
Major party candidates

- Mike Leavitt, Republican
- Stewart Hanson, Democratic
- Merrill Cook, Independent

Other candidates

- Eleanor Garcia, Socialist Workers
- Rita Gum, Populist
- Linda Metzger-Agin, Independent
- Frank W. Richins, Independent American
- Gary R. Van Horn, American

=== Results ===
1992 Utah gubernatorial election
| Party | Candidate | Votes | % | ±% |
|---|---|---|---|---|
| Republican | Mike Leavitt | 321,713 | 42.19% | +3.78% |
| Independent | Merrill Cook | 255,753 | 33.54% | +12.49% |
| Democratic | Stewart Hanson | 177,181 | 23.24% | −16.89% |
| Populist | Rita Gum | 3,593 | 0.47% | |
| American | Gary R. Van Horn | 1,492 | 0.20% | +0.04% |
| Socialist Workers | Eleanor Garcia | 1,158 | 0.15% | |
| Independent | Linda Metzger-Agin | 917 | 0.12% | |
| Independent American | Frank W. Richins | 729 | 0.10% | |
| Total votes | | 762,536 | 100.00% | |
| Plurality | | 65,960 | 8.65% | |
| Republican hold | | Swing | +6.93% | |

=== Results by county ===
| County | Mike Leavitt Republican | | Merrill Cook Independent | | Stewart Hanson Democratic | | All Others Various | | Margin (Note: Leavitt's margin over Cook unless otherwise noted) | | Total votes cast |
| County | # | % | # | % | # | % | # | % | # | % | Total votes cast |
|---|---|---|---|---|---|---|---|---|---|---|---|
| Beaver | 1,121 | 51.54% | 502 | 23.08% | 547 | 25.15% | 5 | 0.23% | 574 (Note: Leavitt's margin over Hanson) | 26.39% | 2,175 |
| Box Elder | 7,863 | 49.02% | 5,994 | 37.37% | 2,005 | 12.50% | 178 | 1.11% | 1,869 | 11.65% | 16,040 |
| Cache | 17,251 | 54.68% | 9,199 | 29.16% | 4,736 | 15.01% | 362 | 1.15% | 8,052 | 25.52% | 31,548 |
| Carbon | 2,149 | 23.77% | 2,956 | 32.70% | 3,850 | 42.59% | 84 | 0.93% | -894 (Note: Hanson's margin over Cook) | -9.89% | 9,039 |
| Daggett | 189 | 44.68% | 108 | 25.53% | 124 | 29.31% | 2 | 0.47% | 65 | 15.37% | 423 |
| Davis | 37,921 | 45.69% | 29,949 | 36.09% | 14,359 | 17.30% | 760 | 0.92% | 7,972 | 9.61% | 82,989 |
| Duchesne | 2,144 | 45.73% | 1,735 | 37.01% | 755 | 16.10% | 54 | 1.15% | 409 | 8.72% | 4,688 |
| Emery | 1,941 | 43.58% | 1,376 | 30.89% | 1,076 | 24.16% | 61 | 1.37% | 565 | 12.69% | 4,454 |
| Garfield | 1,289 | 65.90% | 409 | 20.91% | 248 | 12.68% | 10 | 0.51% | 880 | 44.99% | 1,956 |
| Grand | 1,163 | 34.45% | 1,057 | 31.31% | 1,117 | 33.09% | 39 | 1.16% | 46 | 1.36% | 3,376 |
| Iron | 6,167 | 64.01% | 2,125 | 22.06% | 1,241 | 12.88% | 102 | 1.06% | 4,042 | 41.95% | 9,635 |
| Juab | 1,225 | 42.80% | 1,009 | 35.26% | 597 | 20.86% | 31 | 1.08% | 216 | 7.55% | 2,862 |
| Kane | 1,253 | 56.11% | 660 | 29.56% | 300 | 13.43% | 20 | 0.90% | 593 | 26.56% | 2,233 |
| Millard | 2,510 | 51.20% | 1,703 | 34.74% | 644 | 13.14% | 45 | 0.92% | 807 | 16.46% | 4,902 |
| Morgan | 1,354 | 46.85% | 1,029 | 35.61% | 470 | 16.26% | 37 | 1.28% | 325 | 11.25% | 2,890 |
| Piute | 444 | 59.44% | 191 | 25.57% | 109 | 14.59% | 3 | 0.40% | 253 | 33.87% | 747 |
| Rich | 485 | 55.81% | 208 | 23.94% | 173 | 19.91% | 3 | 0.35% | 277 | 31.88% | 869 |
| Salt Lake | 115,583 | 35.42% | 107,549 | 32.96% | 100,570 | 30.82% | 2,606 | 0.80% | 8,034 | 2.46% | 326,308 |
| San Juan | 2,020 | 48.00% | 563 | 13.38% | 1,596 | 37.93% | 29 | 0.69% | 424 | 10.08% | 4,208 |
| Sanpete | 3,233 | 46.73% | 2,511 | 36.29% | 1,072 | 15.49% | 103 | 1.49% | 722 | 10.44% | 6,919 |
| Sevier | 3,389 | 52.43% | 2,275 | 35.19% | 754 | 11.66% | 46 | 0.71% | 1,114 | 17.23% | 6,464 |
| Summit | 3,194 | 33.49% | 2,629 | 27.57% | 3,645 | 38.22% | 69 | 0.72% | -451 (Note: Hanson's margin over Leavitt) | -4.73% | 9,537 |
| Tooele | 3,712 | 35.03% | 4,017 | 37.90% | 2,785 | 26.28% | 84 | 0.79% | -305 | -2.88% | 10,598 |
| Uintah | 3,328 | 41.81% | 3,224 | 40.51% | 1,308 | 16.43% | 99 | 1.24% | 104 | 1.31% | 7,959 |
| Utah | 59,933 | 54.10% | 37,067 | 33.46% | 12,414 | 11.21% | 1,366 | 1.23% | 22,866 | 20.64% | 110,780 |
| Wasatch | 1,952 | 42.64% | 1,521 | 33.22% | 1,063 | 23.22% | 42 | 0.92% | 431 | 9.41% | 4,578 |
| Washington | 12,113 | 54.74% | 6,590 | 29.78% | 3,037 | 13.72% | 390 | 1.76% | 5,523 | 24.96% | 22,130 |
| Wayne | 773 | 63.99% | 243 | 20.12% | 191 | 15.81% | 1 | 0.08% | 530 | 43.87% | 1,208 |
| Weber | 26,014 | 36.63% | 27,354 | 38.52% | 16,395 | 23.08% | 1,258 | 1.77% | -1,340 | -1.89% | 71,021 |
| Total | 321,713 | 42.19% | 255,753 | 33.54% | 177,181 | 23.24% | 7,889 | 1.03% | 65,960 | 8.65% | 762,536 |

==== Counties that flipped from Democratic to Republican ====
- Beaver
- Daggett
- Duchesne
- Emery
- Grand
- Juab
- Salt Lake
- San Juan
- Wasatch

==== Counties that flipped from Democratic to Independent ====
- Tooele
- Weber
