= League of Women Voters v. Utah State Legislature =

2024 Utah Supreme Court decision

- Court: Utah Supreme Court
- Full case name: League of Women Voters of Utah, et al. v. Utah State Legislature, et al.
- Decided: July 11, 2024
- Citation: 2024 UT 21

Questions presented
- Are citizen initiatives that alter or reform the government protected from legislative changes or repeal?

Holding
- The people have the right to alter or reform their government through citizen initiatives. Legislative changes that impair these reforms must be shown to be narrowly tailored to advance a compelling government interest.

Court membership
- Judges sitting: Matthew B. Durrant, Chief Justice; John A. Pearce, Associate Chief Justice; Paige Petersen, Diana Hagen, Jill Pohlman, Justices

Case opinions
- Majority: Petersen, joined by unanimous

Laws applied
- Utah Const. art. I § 2 Proposition 4 S.B. 200

League of Women Voters v. Utah State Legislature was a 2024 Utah Supreme Court decision regarding the ability of the Utah State Legislature to amend ballot initiatives.

== Background ==
The case arose out of the passage of Proposition 4 by Utah voters in 2018, which made changes to redistricting procedures, including the creation of an independent redistricting commission, designed to stop gerrymandering. Following the passage of Proposition 4, the Utah State Legislature passed S.B. 200, which made multiple changes to Proposition 4, including removing the ban on partisan gerrymandering. In 2021 the Utah State Legislature ignored the recommendations of the independent commission and instead passed their own congressional map which was widely viewed as gerrymandered. As a result, a number of organizations sued, including the League of Women Voters of Utah and Mormon Women for Ethical Government. The case came before the Utah Supreme Court on interlocutory appeal.

== Decision ==
The Utah Supreme Court heard oral arguments on July 11, 2023. Observers reported that the justices appeared skeptical of the legislature's arguments. Exactly one year later on July 11, 2024, the court unanimously (5–0) ruled in favor of the League of Women Voters. The court ruled that the people have a constitutional right to reform their government through ballot initiative, and legislation that would impair such reforms is subject to strict scrutiny. The court then remanded the case back to the district court for further proceedings.

== Aftermath ==
The decision was met with immediate criticism by Republican legislative leaders in the state, who called it "one of the worst outcomes we have ever seen from the Utah Supreme Court." A month after the ruling, the Utah State Legislature called itself into emergency session to propose a constitutional amendment to undo the Utah Supreme Court's decision. The legislature quickly passed Amendment D and placed it on the ballot for the 2024 elections with opposition from all Democratic and some Republican legislators. The amendment, which would have given the Utah State Legislature the power to amend any ballot initiative in any way it chooses, was criticized as being misleading. The legislature had previously changed the law to allow legislative leaders to write the ballot summary instead of nonpartisan staff. A lawsuit against the amendment was filed, arguing that it was misleading and had not followed a requirement that all proposed amendments be published in newspapers for 60 days prior to an election. A district court judge struck down the amendment, ruling that votes on it would not be counted. On appeal to the Utah Supreme Court, the court affirmed the lower court's decision in a unanimous (5–0) ruling, saying in part that "[n]ot only does the ballot title omit a central feature of Amendment D, but the included language would lead a reasonable voter to believe that the amendment does something entirely different." Utah legislative leaders have indicated that they will try to place a similar amendment on the ballot next year.

=== District court proceedings and redraw ===
At the district court level, oral arguments were heard in January 2025. Attorneys for the plaintiffs argued that SB 200 should be repealed entirely, and districts should be redrawn under Proposition 4's rules; attorneys for the Legislature argued that the Utah Constitution still grants the Legislature sole authority over redistricting, regardless of the Supreme Court's decision. A judge ruled that the congressional districts were violently gerrymandered and ordered the legislature to redraw them ahead of the 2026 midterm elections. In response to the ruling the Utah Legislature convened a special session to redraw the congressional map. Republican legislators then passed a map that maintained 4 Republican-leaning districts and no Democratic-leaning districts. Republican legislators also passed a bill to modify Proposition 4 by restricting what types of tests could be used to determine partisan fairness, which led to accusations that the selected tests were handpicked to ensure a Republican gerrymander would survive. The district court ultimately struck down both the new map and the amendments to Proposition 4, finding that they failed to comply with the law and Utah Supreme Court ruling. The district court then adopted a map proposed by the plaintiffs which created 1 Democratic-leaning district and 3 Republican-leaning districts. The legislature failed to exercise its non-discretionary right to a preliminary appeal, but received permission to appeal from the district court. On February 20, 2026, the Utah Supreme Court declined to take up the appeal. Three days later, a three-judge panel in federal court rejected sitting Representatives Celeste Maloy and Burgess Owens's request to block the new map.

=== Backlash against the Utah Supreme Court ===
The Utah Supreme Court's decision in the case—along with other decisions unfavorable to the state—prompted Republican legislators to begin considering changes to the courts. In October 2025 the Legislature took away the Supreme Court's power to choose its own Chief Justice, instead vesting that power in the Governor. In January 2026 the Legislature and Governor quickly moved to expand the Supreme Court from 5 members to 7 in what was widely viewed as an attempt to "pack the court" in order to get more favorable rulings, including in a potential appeal over the new congressional map.

== See also ==
- 2018 Utah Proposition 4
- Constitution of Utah
