= Matthew B. Durrant =

American judge (born 1957)

Matthew Durrant

Chief Justice of the Utah Supreme Court
- In office March 26, 2012 – August 31, 2026
- Preceded by: Christine M. Durham
- Succeeded by: Jill Pohlman (acting)

Justice of the Utah Supreme Court
- In office February 8, 2000 – August 31, 2026
- Appointed by: Mike Leavitt
- Preceded by: I. Daniel Stewart
- Succeeded by: Matthew Bell

Personal details
- Born: March 27, 1957 (age 69) Fort Chaffee, Arkansas, U.S.
- Spouse: Jaclyn Huish
- Education: Brigham Young University (BA); Harvard University (JD)

Matthew B. Durrant (born March 27, 1957) is a former chief justice of the Utah Supreme Court. He is a graduate of both Brigham Young University and Harvard Law School. Durrant had a clerkship with Judge Monroe McKay of the United States Court of Appeals for the Tenth Circuit, a position as a lawyer for the Utah firm Parr, Brown, Gee, and Loveless for over a decade, and time spent on the bench of Utah's Third Judicial District.

== Early life and education ==
Matthew Durrant was born in Arkansas, where his father was stationed at Fort Chaffee. His family continued to live in Arkansas for a short time before moving to Provo, Utah where Durrant spent his elementary school years. When Durrant entered junior high school, his family moved to Salt Lake City, Utah. They subsequently moved back East, to Louisville, Kentucky, where Durrant attended Seneca High School. Durrant was an active participant in numerous extracurricular programs in high school, competing on both the basketball and track teams and serving as the Student Council President in his senior year.

Durrant attended Utah's Brigham Young University as an undergraduate student, where he met and married Jaclyn Huish. He put his education on a two-year hold between his freshman and sophomore years for a mission in Tokyo, Japan for the Church of Jesus Christ of Latter-day Saints. Upon returning from Japan, Durrant completed his undergraduate studies and graduated with a double major in American Studies and Japanese in 1981. He subsequently continued his schooling at Harvard Law School and earned his Juris Doctor degree in 1984.

Durrant has taught as an adjunct professor at the Brigham Young University J. Reuben Clark Law School, teaching constitutional issues regarding family law.

== Judicial career ==
Following his graduation from Harvard University in 1984, Justice Durrant applied for a clerk position for Judge Monroe McKay of the United States Court of Appeals for the Tenth Circuit. He was accepted and spent the next year conducting legal research and assisting the judge in drafting opinions.

Durrant then joined the private law firm Parr Brown Gee & Loveless, working as a civil litigator (commercial law). He became a shareholder in the firm thereafter.

In 1997, three years before taking a seat on the Utah Supreme Court's bench, Governor Mike Leavitt appointed Durrant to Utah's 3rd Judicial District bench. Governor Mike Leavitt later appointed Durrant to the Utah Supreme Court in January 2000. Justice Durrant served as the Chief Justice from April 1, 2012, to August 31, 2026. Durrant retired from the Utah Supreme Court on August 31, 2026.

In response to urging from the Conference of Chief Justices' National Action Plan on Lawyer Conduct and Professionalism, the Utah Supreme Court created the Utah Supreme Court's Advisory Committee on Professionalism on October 1, 2001. Durrant was the founding Chair. The committee's "mission is to oversee the creation, evaluation, and maintenance of standards of conduct and professionalism for our legal community and to assist in the development of and implementation of effective enforcement mechanisms." To further this goal, the committee drafted the Rules of Professionalism and Civility, which set forth guidelines for how Utah lawyers should behave inside the courtroom. Justice Durrant's personal philosophy is "treat people with dignity, even when they don't deserve it." He encourages aspiring lawyers to "look to the standards of professionalism and civility as a guide," and he maintains "extending courtesies…is not a sign of weakness, but a sign of strength."

Durrant also chaired the committee that revised the Code of Judicial Conduct, which established ethical standards for judges, and the Judicial Counsel's Technology committee, which studies technology issues and makes recommendations to the judicial counsel regarding technology and the court system. He also sat as the Utah Supreme Court representative for the Utah Judicial Council, which investigates and reports on various matters pertaining to Utah courts.

== Selected opinions ==
Justice Durrant wrote the majority opinions for each of the following cases.

State v. Mauchley, 67 P.3d 477 (Utah 2003)

On the night of January 5, 1995, Brent Mauchley allegedly fell into an open manhole and sustained several injuries. His story was undoubted, and Mauchley's insurance company settled with him on August 17, 1998. Approximately six months later, Mauchley confessed that his story was untrue – he had constructed the story upon seeing the uncovered manhole. He was charged with insurance fraud and theft by deception. Mauchley moved to dismiss the charges because, absent his confession, there was no independent evidence that a crime had actually occurred. The trial court denied the motion and Mauchley appealed.

Mauchley appealed, citing the corpus delicti rule, which prohibits convicting a person based solely upon his or her confession. The Utah Court of Appeals reversed the denial of Mauchley's motion to dismiss. The Utah Supreme Court granted certiorari to examine the concept of corpus delicti.

In a unanimous decision, the Court found that the corpus delicti rule was anachronistic and was not adequate in protecting an innocent person in the event of a false confession. In its place, the Court introduced the "trustworthiness standard," which takes into account the circumstances of the confession while deciding its usability in court.

Ellis v. Estate of Ellis, 169 P.3d 441 (Utah 2007)

The newlyweds Steven and Aimee Ellis were driving in Shelley, Idaho on January 2, 2001, when Steven Ellis lost control of his car. He swerved into oncoming traffic and crashed into a truck, killing himself instantly. Aimee Ellis sustained severe injuries (including significant head trauma) and was rushed to the hospital.

In 2005, Mrs. Ellis filed a claim against her husband's estate for Mr. Ellis's negligence. The Third District Court dismissed her claim on the grounds of interspousal immunity, the principle under which "the husband and wife are one person in law: that is, the very being or legal existence of the woman is suspended during the marriage, or at least is incorporated and consolidated into that of the husband." Mrs. Ellis appealed to the Utah Supreme Court. Upon reviewing the case, the Court decided in a unanimous vote to overturn the district court's decision, holding that "the common-law doctrine of interspousal immunity has been abrogated in Utah with respect to all claims," thus laying to rest the doctrine of interspousal immunity in Utah.

Burke v. Lewis, 122 P.3d 533, 535 (Utah 2005)

Athan Montgomery sustained serious brain damage at the time of his birth. The birth injury allegedly occurred as a result of attending physician Dr. Gregory Drezga's actions and substandard care during Athan's delivery. Heidi Judd, Montgomery's mother, filed a medical malpractice suit against Drezga, but Drezga had left Utah by the time the suit was filed. Drezga's malpractice insurer would normally have held been responsible for Drezga's legal defense, but they requested that they be removed from responsibility on the grounds that Drezga was not present in Utah to assist in his own defense.

Judd, hoping to ensure that she would still be able to collect any judgment against Drezga, filed a motion requesting the district court to appoint legal counsel to represent Drezga's interests. The district court appointed attorney Paul C. Burke to represent Drezga. Burke appealed the appointment order, but it was dismissed. Burke then filed a Petition for Extraordinary Relief to the Utah Supreme Court because of "his inability to gain speedy review of the appointment order through normal appellate channels." The issue that the Utah Supreme Court was to decide was whether the district court acted outside of its discretion in appointing Burke to act in Drezga's defense absent an express statutory authorizing to do so. In a unanimous decision, the Court decided it was within the district court's discretion to appoint counsel in Drezga's absence, but because of the multitude of factors influencing the district court's decisions, the Supreme Court limited its decision to the unique facts in the case and declined to adopt a general rule that "appointment of counsel is generally an acceptable practice whenever an innocent third party may be subject to adverse repercussions if a judgment is entered against an absent civil litigant."

State v. Levin, 144 P.3d 1096 (Utah 2006)

Ralph Levin was convicted in a Utah trial court for possession of marijuana. He appealed the decision to the Utah Court of Appeals on the grounds that the trial court hadn't suppressed condemning statements he had made prior to being read his Miranda Rights. Levin claimed that the trial court had incorrectly concluded that he had not been subjected to custodial interrogation (in which case, he would not have needed to be told his Miranda Rights).

The Utah Court of Appeals upheld the trial court's decision. It concluded that while Levin had been subjected to interrogation, he was not in custody at the time of interrogation, thereby applying "a deferential 'abuse of discretion' standard of review to the trial court's determination that Levin was not 'in custody.'" Levin petitioned the Utah Supreme Court for a writ of certiorari, arguing that the Court of Appeals had inappropriately applied an abuse of discretion standard in its review of the trial court's decision. The Utah Supreme Court agreed to hear the appeal and, in a unanimous decision, determined the trial court erroneously applied the more deferential "abuse of discretion" standard in reviewing whether Levin should have been given his Miranda rights. The Court remanded the case to the Court of Appeals, holding that "custodial interrogation determinations should be reviewed for correctness."

Conatser v. Johnson, 194 P.3d 897 (Utah 2008)

In June 2000, the Conatser family was fishing in the Weber River when they unintentionally floated into the Johnsons' property. They touched the riverbed four separate times, after which the Johnsons requested that they take their boat from the private property. They were later cited and subsequently convicted for criminal trespass when they exited the boat downstream.

On appeal, the Utah Supreme Court unanimously decided to reverse the conviction and held that the public's easement in state waters allows for the public to participate in lawful recreational activities on state waters. Justice Durrant's opinion noted that "the public has the right to touch privately owned beds of state waters in ways incidental to all recreational rights provided for in the easement, so long as they do so reasonably and cause no unnecessary injury to the landowner."

== Personal life ==
Durrant is married to Jaclyn Huish. They have six children.

Legal offices
Preceded by I. Daniel Stewart	Justice of the Utah Supreme Court; 2000–2026	Succeeded by Matthew Bell
Preceded by Christine M. Durham	Chief Justice of the Utah Supreme Court; 2012–2026	Succeeded by Jill Pohlman; Acting
