= Dixie & Anne Leavitt Family Foundation =

Welfare foundation

- Formation: 2000; 26 years ago
- Founder: Dixie L. Leavitt; Anne Leavitt
- Legal status: Foundation
- Location: Cedar City, Utah, United States
- Services: Education, Health, Welfare

Dixie & Anne Leavitt Family Foundation is a Cedar City, Utah-based private foundation that provides funding for education, health, and welfare initiatives. It was established in 2001 by Dixie L. Leavitt and his wife Anne as Type III supporting organization, a tax structure IRS describes as one of its "Dirty Dozen" tax scams.

== History ==
The Dixie & Anne Leavitt Family Foundation was formed in August 2000, funded with approximately $9 million in assets, including stock from the Leavitt Group insurance business and water rights. It was organized as a Type III supporting organization, a structure that allowed for significant upfront tax deductions based on the assets' market value. In its initial years, the foundation's charitable distributions were minimal relative to its assets, disbursing $49,000 in 2002 and $52,000 in 2003, representing approximately 0.5% and 0.6% of its trust, respectively. During this period, a substantial portion of the foundation's corpus was invested in or loaned to Leavitt family business ventures, including Leavitt Land and Investment, Inc.

Following public scrutiny in the mid-2000s, the foundation's philanthropic activity increased. In 2005 and 2006, it distributed over $1.2 million to charitable causes. The foundation shifted its focus toward more conventional philanthropy, becoming a major supporter of Southern Utah University (SUU). In 2008, it contributed to the funding for a new business building on campus. In 2015, the foundation pledged $7.5 million to SUU, $5 million for the construction of the Dixie L. Leavitt School of Business and $2.5 million for student scholarships. The Business School was completed in 2017. By the 2020s, the foundation's total contributions to SUU exceeded $12 million.

In 2022, it supported the construction of the Virgin Valley Pioneer Park in downtown Mesquite, Nevada.

== Operations ==
As of 2023, the foundation's assets were valued at over $66 million. Its mission focuses on supporting education, health, welfare, religious, and cultural causes. A primary beneficiary is Southern Utah University, where the foundation provides affordable student housing and funds approximately 160 housing scholarships annually. It owns and operates several apartment properties near the SUU campus for this purpose. The foundation also makes grants to other local organizations, including the Neil Simon Festival and The Church of Jesus Christ of Latter-day Saints. The organization is managed by Leavitt family members.

== Controversies ==
In 2006, Leavitt Family Foundation became the subject of national media attention regarding its financial practices. Reports highlighted the disparity between the large tax deductions claimed by the family and the low level of charitable giving in the foundation's early years. Scrutiny focused on the foundation's investments in and loans to family-controlled businesses. Mark W. Everson of IRS cited the foundation's structure as an example of a tax avoidance scheme, and watchdog organizations criticized the arrangement. In response, representatives for the Leavitt family stated that the foundation's activities were legal and that charitable disbursements had increased. The publicity contributed to legislative action, and in 2006, the U.S. Congress passed reforms that tightened the regulations for supporting organizations.

The foundation's dealings with Southern Utah University also drew criticism. Beginning in 2003, the foundation funded housing scholarships for SUU students, with the condition that the funds be used for rent at apartment complexes owned by a Leavitt family business. This arrangement resulted in approximately $500,000 of the foundation's tax-deductible donations being paid as rental income to the family's company. While some members of the university foundation's board raised concerns, the program was approved after a legal review confirmed its compliance with formal requirements. The Leavitt family defended the program as a means to address student housing needs. Following media reports on the practice, the direct rent-back arrangement was discontinued.
