= Count My Vote =

Ballot measure in Utah replacing the caucus system with a primary system

The Count My Vote initiative was a 2014 Utah citizens' initiative measure which proposed to replace the state's caucus selection process for candidates for public office with a mandatory primary election. The initiative sponsors' stated purposes were to increase civic engagement and voter participation. The text of the Count My Vote initiative was incorporated into Senate Bill 54 by the Utah State Legislature—along with an option for a dual-path nominating process involving conventions and/or petitions—and this bill was signed into law by Governor Gary Herbert in March 2014. The constitutionality of this law was challenged in federal court by the Utah Republican Party and the Utah Constitution Party, which opposed the option of qualifying for a primary by means of gathering signatures.

== Purpose ==
Supporters of Count My Vote believed that with the parties mandating the caucus system, many voters were being left out of the candidate selection process entirely. Seven U.S. states use caucuses and conventions, but Utah is the only state which does not allow an alternative method for candidates to get on the ballot without winning a party caucus. Count My Vote advocates argued that many Utahns were being left out of the selection process entirely, due to military or Federal government service, religious service, child care, school, and work obligations that prevented them from participating in caucuses. They also claimed that instead of focusing on the voters, the current caucus process was instead focusing on a select group of delegates who leaned to extreme positions and did not represent Utah’s interests.

Opponents of the Count My Vote initiative see the movement as politically motivated with historical precedent. The Keep My Voice group opposed to Count My Vote has sought to educate the public concerning Utah’s election history and how Utah has already experimented with a direct primary election system back in 1937 when Herbert Maw, a Democrat who was President of the Utah Senate wanted to become governor but couldn’t gather enough support from caucus delegates. Maw convinced fellow legislators to eliminate the caucus system and goto a direct primary system. According to Keep My Voice: "By 1946 Utahns were so dissatisfied with and marginalized by the direct primary everyone was talking about it negatively...The following year the legislature repealed the direct primary law and implemented a balanced hybrid system which is still used today".

Utah's political landscape heavily favored conservative Republicans at the time Count My Vote was conceived. Utah political leaders watched as moderate US Senator Bob Bennett was voted out of office in favor of arch-conservative Mike Lee (R). Like Senator Bennett, sitting US Senator Orrin Hatch had drawn the ire of many Utah arch-conservative voters and was facing a grass roots opposition movement to his re-election bid. Those opposed to Count My Vote believe Count My Vote was crafted with the purpose of allowing moderate Republicans the option of bypassing the caucus/convention system while remaining affiliated with the party. Count My Vote opponents also express concern that elected officials are able to dictate the terms by which private political entities select candidates to represent their views. Count My Vote opponents believe that it is unhealthy for the political system to allow elected officials to govern the processes that are the instruments by which elected officials retain or lose their public posts.

The initiative proposed a direct primary election for federal, state, and county-level public offices. It sought to establish a signature gathering process for political candidates to qualify and appear on the ballot for the direct primary election.

Count My Vote would not have eliminated the current Utah caucus system; rather, supporters argued it would have given voters a greater chance at participation in the early states of the political process. Opponents argued it would make the caucus system irrelevant and have the same effect as eliminating it altogether. The party caucuses would still exist and could still endorse candidates, but the caucuses would no longer be the principal mechanism for selecting candidates. Instead, candidates would be required to show support of 2% of party voters from the district in which they were seeking political office to run in the primary election.

== Support and opposition ==
The Count My Vote initiative was supported by many prominent Democrat, moderate Republican political leaders within Utah, and much of Utah's wealthy establishment, including Mitt Romney, Mike Leavitt (R), Rich McKeown (R), Norma Matheson (D), Gail Miller (R), Ben McAdams (D), Norm Bangerter (R), Kirk Jowers, Ralph Becker (D), Pat Jones (D), Eleanor Muth (R), and Sheryl Allen (R). It was also supported by organizations such as the Utah Student’s Association, Utah Parent-Teacher Association, Utah School Boards Associations, Utahns for Public Schools, Utah Education Association, American Federation of Labor-Congress of Industrial Organizations, and the League of Women Voters.

The initiative was opposed by Protect Our Neighborhood Elections.

== S.B. 54 ==
S.B. 54 (also referred to as the Count My Vote bill) was a Utah State Senate bill proposed by Senator Curt Bramble. S.B. 54 contained the same language as the initial Count My Vote Initiative to include 1) allowing party members to vote remotely or by absentee ballot for their neighborhood delegates, 2) providing a procedure to designate an alternate delegate should the delegate be unable to attend the convention, 3) establishing a 65% minimum delegate vote threshold to avoid a primary election, and 4) permitting unaffiliated voters who don’t belong to a particular party to vote for a candidates in a primary election. A political party which agreed to adopt these changes in their caucuses would be exempt from the Count My Vote language, thus preserving the caucus system and avoiding direct primary elections.

Many opponents of the bill claimed that the bill was an attempt to bypass the ballot initiative procedure safeguarded under the Utah constitution. Utah Governor Gary Herbert had suggested he might veto S.B. 54 if it were to pass the legislature.

In early March 2014, Count My Vote supporters and the Utah legislature agreed to a compromise in which S.B. 54 would incorporate a provision allowing for candidates to get on the primary ballot in Utah by completing a write-in campaign. Candidates running for statewide office would need to gather 28,000 signatures; candidates for the United States House of Representatives would need around 7,000 signatures; state Senate candidates would need to collect 2,000 signatures; and a state House Candidate would need 1,000 signatures.

S.B. 54, as thus amended, would create a hybrid primary election system allowing for both a party caucus and a direct primary election. Additionally, it would allow voters not publicly affiliated with any political party to participate in primary elections. On March 5, 2014, S.B. 54 passed the House legislature (on a vote of 49 in favor, 20 opposed, and 6 not voting), and it was signed into law by Governor Gary Herbert on March 10.

After S.B. 54 was signed into law by the governor, the supporters of the Count My Vote ballot measure halted their petition drive.

== Court challenge ==
Leaders of the Utah Republican Party, claiming popular opposition to S.B. 54, objected to numerous provisions in the law and argued that the party might not have time to make necessary changes to its rules in order to comply with the new law by the 2016 elections. They decided to file a suit challenging the constitutionality of S.B. 54. U.S. District Judge David Nuffer initially postponed a hearing on the state Republican Party challenge to the law until after the end of the current state legislative session, in case the legislature were to decide to amend the law. The judge held a hearing on April 10, 2015 to consider a request for a preliminary injunction against S.B. 54, but he declined to issue such an injunction. As of May 28, 2015, no ruling has been issued regarding the new law.
