= Michael J. Wilkins =

American judge

Associate Chief Justice of the Utah Supreme Court
- In office January 2000 – May 15, 2010
- Appointed by: Mike Leavitt

Judge of the Utah Court of Appeals
- In office August 1994 – January 2000
- Appointed by: Mike Leavitt

Personal details
- Born: Michael Jon Wilkins; May 13, 1948 (age 77) Murray, Utah
- Spouse: Diane W. Wilkins
- Education: University of Utah (BS, JD); University of Virginia (LLM)

Michael Jon Wilkins (born May 13, 1948) is an American lawyer and judge. He is a retired Justice of the Utah Supreme Court and current chairman of the Utah Independent Ethics Commission.

== Biography ==
=== Education ===
He graduated from the University of Utah in 1975 with a Bachelor of Science degree and from the S. J. Quinney College of Law with a Juris Doctor in 1977. He received a Master of Laws degree from the University of Virginia School of Law in 2001.

=== Private Practice ===
From 1977 to 1994, Mike Wilkins practiced law in Salt Lake City.

=== Utah Court of Appeals ===
Michael J. Wilkins was appointed by Governor Mike Leavitt in August 1994 to the Utah Court of Appeals. And he served there until his appointment to the Supreme Court. Justice Wilkins served as presiding judge of the Court of Appeals.

=== Utah Supreme Court ===
Justice Wilkins was appointed in 2000 to the Supreme Court. He served as Associate Chief Justice of the Supreme Court.

Justice Wilkins has been a member of the Judicial Council and has served as chair of the Judicial Council's Policy and Planning Committee, Legislative Liaison Committee, and Standing Committee on Technology. He has chaired the Supreme Court's Committee on Professionalism, and teaches as an adjunct professor at Brigham Young University's J. Reuben Clark Law School.

=== Independent Ethics Commission ===
Justice Wilkins is a former member of the Utah Legislature's Independent Ethics Commission. The five-member commission, established 2 July 2010, handles ethic complaints against lawmakers that previously were dealt with by members of the Legislature.

== See also ==
- Utah Supreme Court
- Utah Court of Appeals
- Utah Legislature
