= Utah State Legislative districts =

There are two types of Utah State Legislature districts.

== Utah State Senate districts ==
The state is divided into 29 Senate districts, each representing approximately 100,000 people (estimated in 2018 from 2010 census).

District	Name	County(ies)
1	Escamilla, Luz (D)	Salt Lake
2	Kitchen, Derek L. (D)	Salt Lake
3	Davis, Gene (D)	Salt Lake
4	Iwamoto, Jani (D)	Salt Lake
5	Mayne, Karen (D)	Salt Lake
6	Harper, Wayne A. (R)	Salt Lake
7	Mikell, Michael K. (R)	Utah
8	Riebe, Kathleen (D)	Salt Lake
9	Cullimore, Kirk (R)	Salt Lake
10	Fillmore, Lincoln (R)	Salt Lake
11	McCay, Daniel (R)	Salt Lake, Utah
12	Thatcher, Daniel W. (R)	Salt Lake, Tooele
13	Anderegg, Jacob L. (R)	Salt Lake, Utah
14	Kennedy, Michael S. (R)	Utah
15	Grover, Keith (R)	Utah
16	Bramble, Curtis S. (R)	Utah, Wasatch
17	Sandall, Scott D. (R)	Box Elder, Cache, Tooele
18	Millner, Ann (R)	Davis, Morgan, Weber
19	Johnson, John D. (R)	Morgan, Summit, Weber
20	Buxton, David G. (R)	Davis, Weber
21	Stevenson, Jerry W. (R)	Davis
22	Adams, J. Stuart (R)	Davis
23	Weiler, Todd (R)	Davis, Salt Lake
24	Owens, Derrin R. (R)	Beaver, Garfield, Juab, Kane, Millard, Piute, Sanpete, Sevier, Utah, Wayne
25	Wilson, Chris H. (R)	Cache, Rich
26	Winterton, Ronald M. (R)	Daggett, Duchesne, Summit, Uintah, Wasatch
27	Hinkins, David P. (R)	Carbon, Emery, Grand, San Juan, Utah, Wasatch
28	Vickers, Evan J. (R)	Beaver, Iron, Washington
29	Ipson, Don L. (R)	Washington

== State House districts ==
The House is divided into 75 House districts, each representing approximately 40,000 people.

DISTRICT	REPRESENTATIVE	PARTY	COUNTIES REPRESENTED
1	Ferry, Joel	Republican	Box Elder, Cache
2	Moss, Jefferson	Republican	Utah
3	Petersen, Michael J.	Republican	Cache
4	Johnson, Dan N.	Republican	Cache
5	Snider, Casey	Republican	Cache
6	Maloy, A. Cory	Republican	Utah
7	Wilcox, Ryan D.	Republican	Weber
8	Waldrip, Steve	Republican	Weber
9	Musselman, Calvin R.	Republican	Weber
10	Lesser, Rosemary T.	Democratic	Weber
11	Miles, Kelly B.	Republican	Davis, Weber
12	Schultz, Mike	Republican	Davis, Weber
13	Peterson, Karen M.	Republican	Davis
14	Lisonbee, Karianne	Republican	Davis
15	Wilson, Brad R.	Republican	Davis
16	Handy, Stephen G.	Republican	Davis
17	Barlow, Stewart E.	Republican	Davis
18	Hawkes, Timothy D.	Republican	Davis
19	Ward, Raymond P.	Republican	Davis
20	Ballard, Melissa Garff	Republican	Davis
21	Sagers, Douglas V.	Republican	Tooele
22	Collard, Clare	Democratic	Salt Lake
23	Hollins, Sandra	Democratic	Salt Lake
24	Dailey-Provost, Jennifer	Democratic	Salt Lake
25	Briscoe, Joel K.	Democratic	Salt Lake
26	Romero, Angela	Democratic	Salt Lake
27	Brammer, Brady	Republican	Utah
28	King, Brian S.	Democratic	Salt Lake, Summit
29	Gwynn, Matthew H.	Republican	Box Elder, Weber
30	Winder, Mike	Republican	Salt Lake
31	Weight, Elizabeth	Democratic	Salt Lake
32	Harrison, Suzanne	Democratic	Salt Lake
33	Rohner, Judy Weeks	Republican	Salt Lake
34	Kwan, Karen	Democratic	Salt Lake
35	Wheatley, Mark A.	Democratic	Salt Lake
36	Owens, Doug	Democratic	Salt Lake
37	Moss, Carol Spackman	Democratic	Salt Lake
38	Matthews, Ashlee	Republican	Salt Lake
39	Dunnigan, James A.	Republican	Salt Lake
40	Pitcher, Stephanie	Democratic	Salt Lake
41	Strong, Mark A.	Republican	Salt Lake
42	Teuscher, Jordan D.	Republican	Salt Lake
43	Eliason, Steve.	Republican	Salt Lake
44	Stoddard, Andrew	Republican	Salt Lake
45	Eliason, Steve	Republican	Salt Lake
46	Bennion, Gay Lynn	Democratic	Salt Lake
47	Ivory, Ken	Republican	Salt Lake
48	Stratton, Keven J.	Republican	Utah
49	Spendlove, Robert M.	Republican	Salt Lake
50	Pulsipher, Susan	Republican	Salt Lake
51	Stenquist, Jeffrey D.	Republican	Salt Lake
52	Pierucci, Candice B.	Republican	Salt Lake
53	Birkeland, Kera	Republican	Daggett, Duchesne, Morgan, Rich, Summit
54	Kohler, Mike L.	Republican	Summit, Wasatch
55	Chew, Scott H.	Republican	Duchesne, Uintah
56	Christofferson, Kay J.	Republican	Utah
57	Hawkins, Jon	Republican	Utah
58	Lund, Steven J.	Republican	Juab, Sanpete
59	Peterson, Val L.	Republican	Utah
60	Abbott, Nelson T.	Republican	Utah
61	Judkins, Marsha	Republican	Utah
62	Seegmiller, Travis M.	Republican	Washington
63	Robertson, Adam	Republican	Utah
64	Thurston, Norman K.	Republican	Utah
65	Whyte, Stephen L.	Republican	Utah
66	Burton, Jefferson S.	Republican	Utah
67	Welton, Douglas R.	Republican	Utah
68	Nelson, Merrill F.	Republican	Beaver, Juab, Millard, Tooele, Utah
69	Watkins, Christine F	Republican	Carbon, Duchesne, Emery, Grand
70	Albrecht, Carl R.	Republican	Emery, Grand, Sanpete, Sevier
71	Last, Bradley G.	Republican	Iron, Washington
72	Shipp, Rex P.	Republican	Iron
73	Lyman, Phil	Republican	Beaver, Garfield, Kane, Piute, San Juan, Sevier, Wayne
74	Snow, V. Lowry	Republican	Washington
75	Brooks, Walt	Republican	Washington

== See also ==
- Utah's congressional districts (for districts at the national level)
