= 1996 Utah gubernatorial election =

- November 5, 1996
- Turnout: 65.78% (of registered voters)
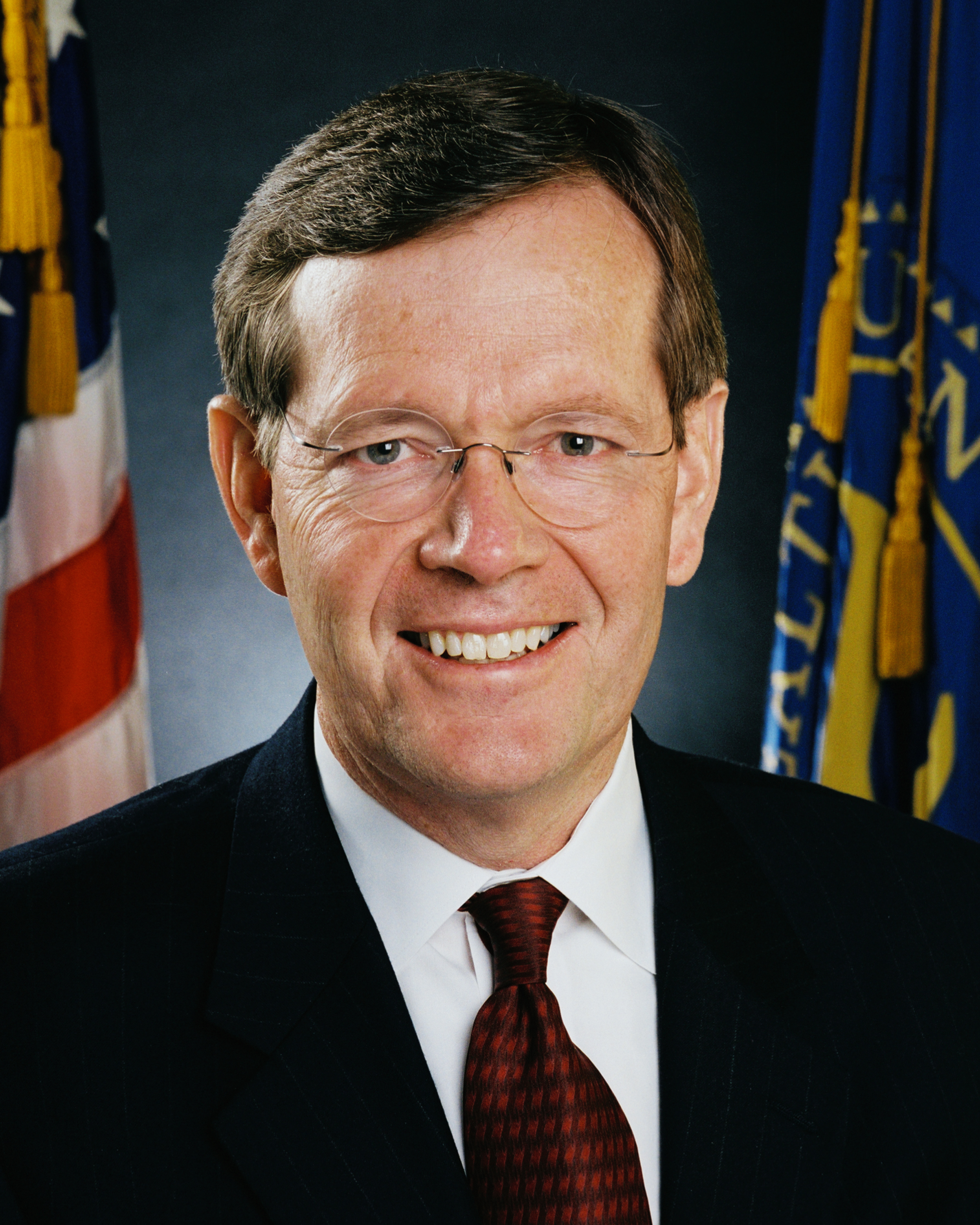

Nominee	Mike Leavitt	Jim Bradley
Party	Republican	Democratic
Running mate	Olene Walker	Shari Holweg
Popular vote	503,693	156,616
Percentage	74.97%	23.31%
- County results Leavitt: 50–60% 60–70% 70–80% 80–90%
Governor before election
Mike Leavitt
Republican
Elected Governor
Mike Leavitt
Republican

The 1996 Utah gubernatorial election took place on November 5, 1996. Republican nominee and incumbent Governor Michael Leavitt easily won reelection.

== Primary election ==
Democrat E. James Bradley, who had been elected as a Salt Lake County Commissioner in 1990 and lost re-election in 1994, announced his candidacy on March 18, 1996, the last day for candidates to file. If he had not run, it was likely the Democratic party would not have had a candidate on the ballot.

Utah held a primary election on June 25, 1996. All candidates in the gubernatorial election were nominated without opposition and no names of gubernatorial candidates appeared on the ballot.

== General election ==
=== Campaign ===
In a poll released in early April 1996, Bradley trailed Leavitt by 63 points. Leavitt, with high popularity ratings as the incumbent Governor, maintained a formidable lead in subsequent polls as well.

Leavitt and Bradley participated in a televised debate on October 26, 1996, at Brigham Young University. Winning by the greatest margin in the state's history, Leavitt won every county. Leavitt outspent Bradley four times over in his campaign, and raised over $650,000.

=== Candidates ===
Major party candidates

- Mike Leavitt, Republican
- Jim Bradley, Democratic

Other candidates

- Ken Larsen, Independent American
- Dub Richards, Independent
- Robert C. Lesh, Natural Law

=== Results ===
1996 Utah gubernatorial election
Party	Candidate	Votes	%	±%
Republican	Mike Leavitt (incumbent)	503,693	74.97%	+32.78%
Democratic	Jim Bradley	156,616	23.31%	+0.07%
Independent American	Ken Larsen	4,741	0.71%	+0.61%
Independent	Dub Richards	3,845	0.57%	
Natural Law	Robert C. Lesh	2,969	0.44%	
Write-in	Linda Metzger-Agin	15	0.00%	−0.12%
Total votes		671,879	100.00%	
Majority		347,077	51.66%	
Republican hold		Swing	+32.70%	

=== Results by county ===
County	Mike Leavitt Republican		Jim Bradley Democratic		All Others Various		Margin		Total votes cast
County	#	%	#	%	#	%	#	%	Total votes cast
Beaver	1,760	80.88%	392	18.01%	24	1.10%	1,368	62.87%	2,176
Box Elder	11,695	85.71%	1,762	12.91%	188	1.38%	9,933	72.80%	13,645
Cache	22,872	85.10%	3,614	13.45%	392	1.46%	19,258	71.65%	26,878
Carbon	4,215	54.88%	3,365	43.81%	101	1.31%	850	11.07%	7,681
Daggett	292	72.46%	108	26.80%	3	0.74%	184	45.66%	403
Davis	57,137	80.38%	12,810	18.02%	1,140	1.60%	44,327	62.36%	71,087
Duchesne	3,545	83.33%	655	15.40%	54	1.27%	2,890	67.94%	4,254
Emery	3,236	78.18%	835	20.17%	68	1.64%	2,401	58.01%	4,139
Garfield	1,582	57.60%	215	11.90%	9	0.50%	1,367	75.69%	1,806
Grand	2,066	63.03%	1,094	33.37%	118	3.60%	972	29.65%	3,278
Iron	8,608	87.20%	1,105	11.19%	158	1.60%	7,503	76.01%	9,871
Juab	1,967	76.57%	573	22.30%	29	1.13%	1,394	54.26%	2,569
Kane	2,054	86.59%	274	11.55%	44	1.85%	1,780	75.04%	2,372
Millard	3,652	84.32%	599	13.83%	80	1.85%	3,053	70.49%	4,331
Morgan	2,395	82.70%	480	16.57%	21	0.73%	1,915	66.13%	2,896
Piute	609	86.38%	95	13.48%	1	0.14%	514	72.91%	705
Rich	675	85.44%	109	13.80%	6	0.76%	566	71.65%	790
Salt Lake	189,680	67.15%	87,170	30.86%	5,639	2.00%	102,510	36.29%	282,489
San Juan	2,492	60.91%	1,550	37.89%	49	1.20%	942	23.03%	4,091
Sanpete	5,088	81.04%	1,053	16.77%	137	2.18%	4,035	64.27%	6,278
Sevier	5,486	86.94%	741	11.74%	83	1.32%	4,745	75.20%	6,310
Summit	6,096	64.95%	3,101	33.04%	188	2.00%	2,995	31.91%	9,385
Tooele	6,676	70.27%	2,664	28.04%	161	1.69%	4,012	42.23%	9,501
Uintah	6,133	81.33%	1,264	16.76%	144	1.91%	4,869	64.57%	7,541
Utah	86,852	87.20%	11,508	11.55%	1,238	1.24%	75,344	75.65%	99,598
Wasatch	3,370	77.70%	915	21.10%	52	1.20%	2,455	56.61%	4,337
Washington	21,324	84.70%	3,512	13.95%	341	1.35%	17,812	70.75%	25,177
Wayne	963	84.85%	162	14.27%	10	0.88%	801	70.57%	1,135
Weber	41,173	72.04%	14,891	26.05%	1,092	1.91%	26,282	45.98%	57,156
Total	503,693	74.97%	156,616	23.31%	11,570	1.72%	347,077	51.66%	671,879

==== Counties that flipped from Democratic to Republican ====
- Carbon
- Summit

==== Counties that flipped from Independent to Republican ====
- Tooele
- Weber
