= Dixie L. Leavitt =

American politician (1929–2026)

Member of the Utah Senate from the 11th district
- In office January 1, 1989 – December 31, 1992
- Preceded by: Ivan M. Matheson
- Succeeded by: David L. Watson

Member of the Utah Senate from the 11th, 29th district
- In office January 1, 1965 – December 31, 1976
- Preceded by: Charles R. Hunter
- Succeeded by: Ivan M. Matheson

Member of the Utah House of Representatives from the 24th district
- In office January 1, 1963 – December 31, 1964
- Preceded by: Kumen S. Gardner
- Succeeded by: J. Harold Mitchell

Personal details
- Born: August 27, 1929 St. George, Utah, U.S.
- Died: November 17, 2026 (aged 97) Cedar City, Utah, U.S.
- Party: Republican
- Spouse: Anne Okerlund (m. 1950)
- Children: 6, including Mike
- Education: Branch Agricultural College
- Profession: Insurance executive

Dixie Lorraine Leavitt (August 27, 1929 – November 17, 2026) was an American businessman and state legislator who served as a Republican member of the Utah State House of Representatives and Senate from 1963 to 1976, and from 1989 to 1992 from Utah's 24th house district and 11th and 29th senate districts. He was the founder of the Leavitt Group, one of the largest independent insurance brokerages in the nation, and was the father of former Utah governor Mike Leavitt.

== Background ==
Dixie Lorraine Leavitt was born in St. George, Utah, and raised in the town of Bunkerville, in the state of Nevada. He attended Virgin Valley High School, where he served as student body president and was an all-state basketball player. After high school, Dixie went to Branch Agricultural College (BAC) in Cedar City, Utah, where he was yearbook editor and student body president, and became the institution's first student to letter all four years in both football and track. He married Anne Okerlund in 1950. The couple had six sons, including Mike Leavitt, former U.S. Secretary of Health and Human Services, administrator of the EPA, and governor of Utah.

Leavitt was a member of the Church of Jesus Christ of Latter-day Saints. He died of pneumonia at a hospital in Cedar City, Utah, on November 17, 2026, at the age of 97.

== Early career ==
Leavitt's plan throughout college was to become a schoolteacher. In 1951, after graduating from BAC, he began teaching fourth grade at Cedar West Elementary School.

After that first year, during the summer of 1952, Leavitt got a job selling insurance. Though he fully intended to return to teaching in the fall, during the week before school began, the manager of the insurance company paid him a visit and urged him to stay in the insurance business. Leavitt loved the business and believed he could prosper, so he decided to remain.

His first insurance office was a desk in his family's small basement apartment. His business prospered and in 1959, Leavitt partnered with his brother, Bert, to create the first Leavitt Group affiliated agency. Leavitt created the model based on the principle of aligned interests between the Leavitt Group (which maintains contractual control) and its local managing co-owners (who maintain client control).

Leavitt's business grew as he partnered with other individuals and insurance agencies using the 60/40 ownership arrangement. This unique, new model worked because sharing significant ownership and profits provided the natural incentives to make each agency thrive. Unlike a typical aggregator, The Leavitt Group's "60/40" model gave independent agents a new alternative to their growth and perpetuation needs. The local manager could remain an owner and take responsibility for the local agency culture. As a result, numerous agencies have embraced this model, and today the Leavitt Group is ranked as one of the largest privately held insurance brokerages in the United States.

== Utah State Legislature ==
Leavitt served 18 years in the Utah State Legislature (from 1963 to 1976 and from 1989 to 1992) As a legislator, he worked to obtain four-year status for the College of Southern Utah (CSU), which was among his first legislative successes. Another notable legislative achievement was his bill that became the Utah Higher Education Act of 1969. One of the crowning accomplishments of his service in the Utah State Senate was the advancement to university status of Southern Utah University.

== Religious and community service ==
Leavitt also served three years as president of the Leeds, England Mission of the Church of Jesus Christ of Latter-day Saints (LDS Church) in Leeds, England. As a mission president, he presided over 100 missionaries, directing the affairs of the mission organization, its people and assets. After this ecclesiastical service, he formed Leavitt Land and Investments and the Dixie and Anne Foundation—one purpose of which is to provide and manage scholarship housing for Southern Utah University students.
