= Jill Pohlman =

American judge

Chief Justice of the Utah Supreme Court
- Acting
- Assumed office August 31, 2026
- Preceded by: Matthew B. Durrant

Justice of the Utah Supreme Court
- Incumbent
- Assumed office August 17, 2022
- Appointed by: Spencer Cox
- Preceded by: Thomas Rex Lee

Personal details
- Born: Jill McKee; April 8, 1973 (age 53) Ogden, Utah, U.S.
- Education: University of Utah (BS, JD)

Jill McKee Pohlman (born April 8, 1973) is an American lawyer from Utah who serves as a justice of the Utah Supreme Court. From 2016 to 2022, she was an associate presiding judge of the Utah Court of Appeals.

== Education ==
Pohlman was born in Ogden, Utah and attended Alta High School She received a Bachelor of Science from the University of Utah. She received a Juris Doctor from the S.J. Quinney College of Law,. where she graduated Order of the Coif and was a member of the Utah Law Review.

== Legal career ==
Pohlman served as a law clerk for Chief Judge David Kent Winder of the United States District Court for the District of Utah and the U.S. Attorney's office. She was a partner at the law firm of Stoel Rives in both their litigation and appellate practice groups. One of her high profile cases included the ethics investigation of the 2002 Winter Olympics.

== Judicial career ==
=== Utah Court of Appeals ===
In 2016, Pohlman was appointed as a judge of the Utah Court of Appeals by Utah Governor Gary Herbert. She filled the seat left by the retirement of judge James Davis. She assumed office in May 2016. In August 2017, she became part of a female majority on the court of appeals.

=== Utah Supreme Court ===
On May 20, 2022, Pohlman was one of seven candidates recommended by the appellate judicial nominating commission. On June 28, 2022, Governor Spencer Cox announced the appointment of Pohlman to serve as a justice of the Utah Supreme Court to fill the vacancy of Thomas R. Lee who retired on July 31, 2022. On July 26, 2022, her nomination was unanimously advanced out of the Utah Senate Judicial Confirmation Committee. On August 17, 2022, her nomination was unanimously confirmed by the Utah Senate. With her confirmation, Pohlman brought the Utah Supreme Court to a female majority. She had a formal investiture on January 27, 2023.

Legal offices
| Preceded by Thomas Rex Lee | Justice of the Utah Supreme Court; 2022–present | Incumbent |
| Preceded by Matthew B. Durrant | Chief Justice of the Utah Supreme Court; Acting; 2026–present | Incumbent |
