= Richard and Linda J. Eyre =

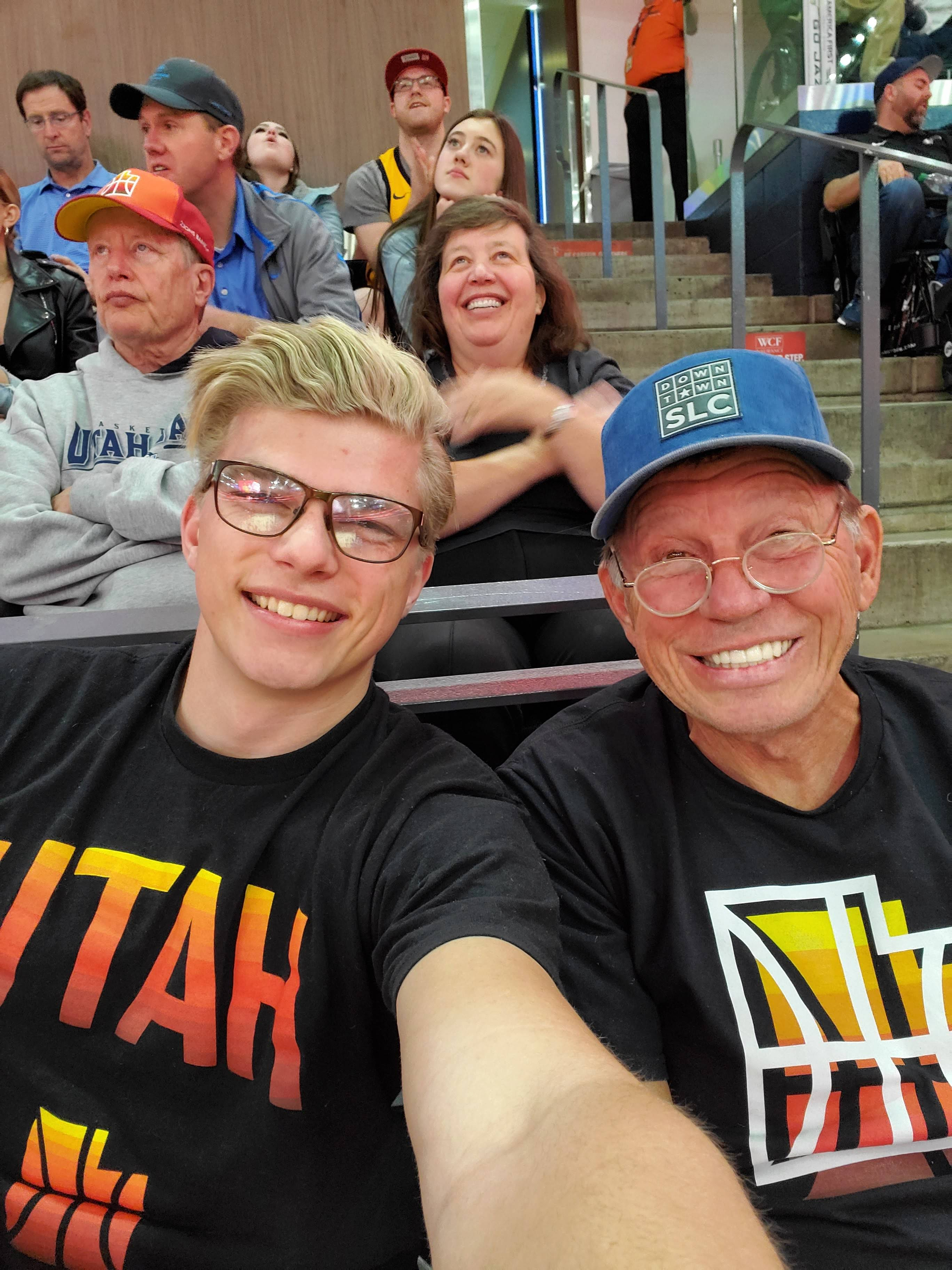
Richard Eyre (right) and his grandson at a Utah Jazz game (2019)

Richard M. Eyre (born 1944) is a consultant, speaker, and author of many books. He was also a candidate for the Republican nomination for Utah governor in 1992.

== Education ==
Eyre holds degrees from Utah State University and Brigham Young University and an MBA from Harvard. His wife, Linda J. Eyre, has a degree from Utah State University.

== Publications ==
The Eyres have written over a dozen books, with several of them becoming bestsellers. These include Teaching Your Children Values, which was the first parenting book to make it to the position of #1 New York Times bestseller since Dr. Spock's book. Eyre's Spiritual Serendipity: Cultivating and Celebrating the Art of the Unexpected was published by Simon & Schuster in 1997. Other books by Eyre include The Discovery of Joy (1974), Teaching Children Joy (1986), The Birth We Call Death with Paul H. Dunn, Life Before Life (2000) and How to Talk to Your Children About Sex, written with Linda. Besides writing these non-fiction works, Eyre has written a novel entitled The Awakening. A more recent book by the Eyres, Empty Nesting Parenting: Adjusting Your Stewardship as Your Children Leave Home, has been recommended as reading for parents of college students.

Linda Eyre has also written several books on being a mother on her own or with other female authors.

The Eyres have hosted the program Families Are Forever on the VISN Network. They have nine children, and have lived in both Washington, D.C. and Salt Lake City, Utah.

== Religion ==
Richard Eyre is a member of the Church of Jesus Christ of Latter-day Saints (LDS Church). As a young man, Eyre served as a missionary in New York City. He later served as a mission president in the church's England London South Mission. Baptisms spiked in the mission after the results of an opinion poll on parenthood conducted by Eyre were published in such publications as the London Evening Standard.

Eyre wrote the Encyclopedia of Mormonism article on joy. He also wrote the section on the views of the LDS Church in How Different Religions View Death and Afterlife: Second Edition edited by Christopher Jay Johnson and Marsha McGee.

== Politics ==
During the Reagan administration, Eyre served as the director of the White House Conference on Parents and Children.

Eyre has also been a long-time advocate of schools of choice and voucher programs. He was a candidate for the governorship of Utah with this as one of his major campaign planks in 1992. Eyre won the support of the Republican state convention but lost to Mike Leavitt in the later Republican primary. Eyre has since been a major supporter of vouchers, and was one of the key speakers for the voucher proposition on Utah's 2007 ballot.

Linda has also served as a member of the Utah State University board of trustees.

== Other ==
The Eyres also serve as board members of CHOICE humanitarian and have been involved in projects to bring wells to villages in such countries as Bolivia.
