= Mike Leavitt =

8th U.S. Secretary of Health and Human Services

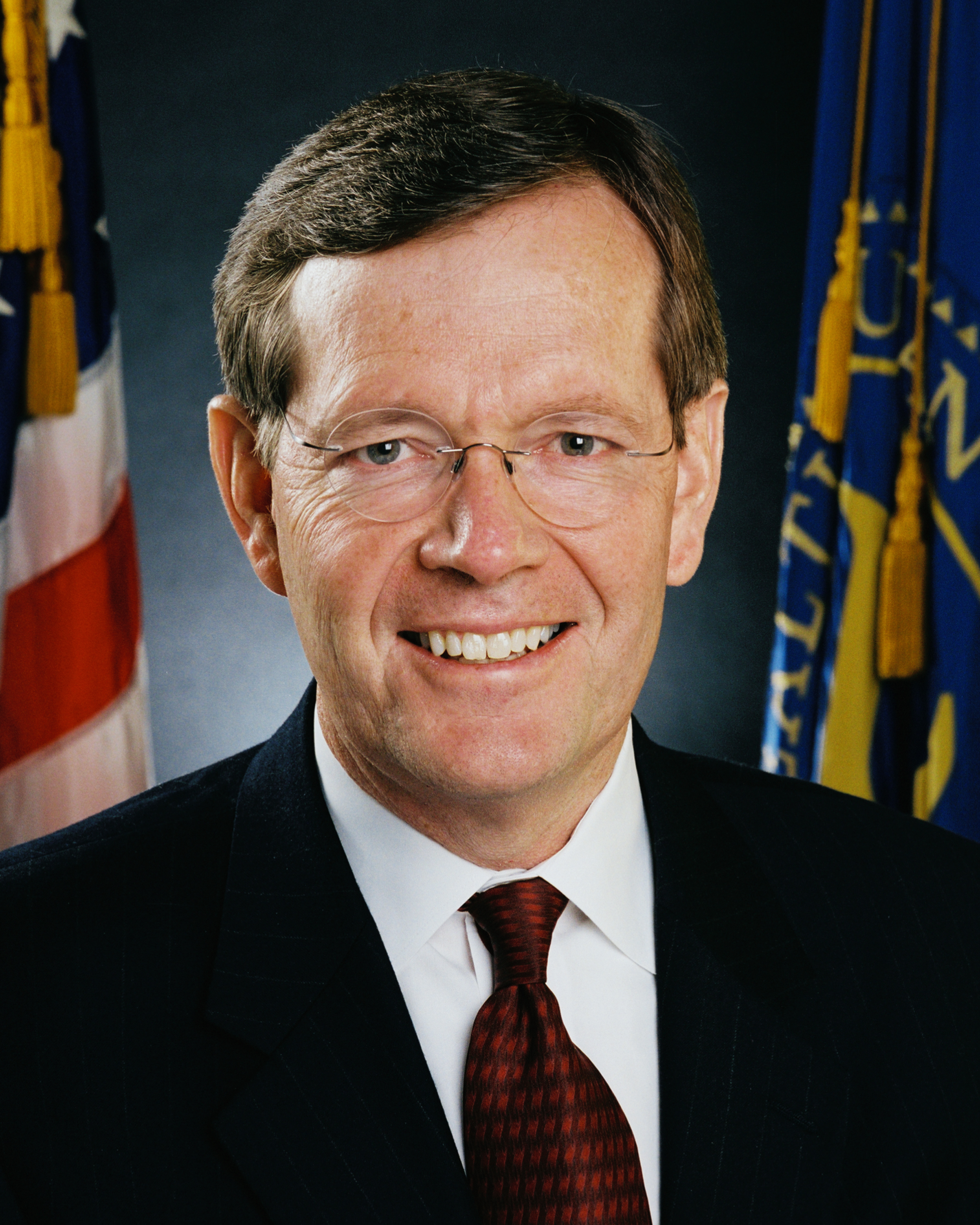
- Official portrait, 2005

20th United States Secretary of Health and Human Services
- In office January 26, 2005 – January 20, 2009
- President: George W. Bush
- Preceded by: Tommy Thompson
- Succeeded by: Kathleen Sebelius

10th Administrator of the Environmental Protection Agency
- In office November 6, 2003 – January 26, 2005
- President: George W. Bush
- Preceded by: Christine Todd Whitman
- Succeeded by: Stephen L. Johnson

Chair of the National Governors Association
- In office August 10, 1999 – July 11, 2000
- Preceded by: Tom Carper
- Succeeded by: Parris Glendening

14th Governor of Utah
- In office January 4, 1993 – November 5, 2003
- Lieutenant: Olene Walker
- Preceded by: Norman Bangerter
- Succeeded by: Olene Walker

Personal details
- Born: Michael Okerlund Leavitt; February 11, 1951 (age 75) Cedar City, Utah, U.S.
- Party: Republican
- Spouse: Jacalyn Smith
- Children: 5
- Education: Southern Utah University (BA)
- Leavitt's voice Leavitt before a Senate Appropriations subcommittee on FY2007 HHS funding. Recorded May 3, 2006

Michael Okerlund Leavitt (born February 11, 1951) is an American politician who served as the 20th United States secretary of health and human services from 2005 to 2009 and the 10th administrator of the Environmental Protection Agency from 2003 to 2005. A member of the Republican Party, he served as the 14th governor of Utah from 1993 to 2003.

Leavitt started his career in 1972 and worked in the insurance and risk management industry until 1992. From 1984 until his election as Governor of Utah in 1992, he was the president and chief executive officer (CEO) of The Leavitt Group. As governor, Leavitt worked to establish Western Governors University and the first charter schools in Utah, led the state's preparation for the 2002 Winter Olympics in Utah, was a leader in the implementation of a modernized system of sales tax on e-commerce throughout the United States, negotiated the largest land exchanges between a state and the federal government, initiated an engineering education initiative, worked on the devolution of welfare to the states, and established the Utah Centennial Highway Fund which featured design build highway construction.

Leavitt resigned as governor in 2003 after he was successfully nominated by President George W. Bush to lead the EPA; he was succeeded as governor by Olene Walker, his lieutenant governor. Leavitt was promoted to Secretary of Health and Human Services at the start of Bush's second term, serving until the conclusion of the Bush administration. As HHS Secretary, he oversaw the implementation of Medicare Part D, developed the National Pandemic Plan, promoted value-based health care, mitigated the effects of Hurricane Katrina, opened FDA offices in China, India, South America, and reauthorized SCHIP and TANF.

Leavitt now works as a health care advisor, investor, and independent corporate director. In August 2021, he became president of the Tabernacle Choir.

== Early life and education ==
Leavitt was born in Cedar City, Utah, the son of Phyllis Anne (Okerlund) and Dixie L. Leavitt. Leavitt graduated with a degree in business from Southern Utah University and married Jacalyn Smith. They have five children.

== Career ==
=== Early career ===
Leavitt's business career started with his joining The Leavitt Group, a regional insurance company founded by his father. He rose to become the company's president and CEO and presided over a period of expansion. He was subsequently appointed to the boards of directors of numerous local and regional companies, including Utah Power and Light, as well as a member of the Utah State Board of Regents. As a regent, he helped oversee Utah's nine public colleges and universities. For four years, he was chair of Southern Utah University's (SUU) board of trustees.

In 1976, Leavitt assisted his father, then a Utah state senator, in an unsuccessful campaign for governor. He worked on a number of U.S. Senate campaigns through the 1980s for Jake Garn and Orrin Hatch.

=== Political career ===
==== Governor of Utah ====
Leavitt first ran for governor in 1992. He had tough competition in the Republican Party primary from Richard Eyre who had more delegates vote for him at the state Republican convention. He defeated Independent Party candidate Merrill Cook and Democratic nominee Stewart Hanson in the general election, becoming the 14th Governor of Utah.

A holiday fire shortly before noon on December 15, 1993, destroyed much of the Utah Governor's Mansion, but spared the lives of the first family and staff (Jacalyn Leavitt and some members of the family and staff were in the home at the time of the fire).

Leavitt was re-elected in 1996 with the largest vote total in state history. While Governor, he and Roy Romer of Colorado were the two key founders of Western Governors University in 1997, one of the first exclusively online schools in the nation. In addition to Leavitt and Romer, 17 other governors signed legislation creating the school as a non-profit private university.

In 2000, Leavitt became only the second governor in Utah history to be re-elected to a third term. As governor, he held leadership positions in national and regional organizations, which included chairing the Republican Governors Association from 1994 to 1995, the Western Governors Association from 1995 to 1996, the Council of State Governments from 1996 to 1997, and the National Governors Association from 1999 to 2000.

==== EPA administrator ====
On August 11, 2003, President George W. Bush nominated Leavitt as Administrator of the EPA at a press conference in Aurora, Colorado. He was confirmed on October 28, 2003, by a vote of 88–8 in the United States Senate. On November 5, having resigned the governorship, Leavitt was sworn in as the 10th Administrator of the EPA.

At the EPA he implemented higher standards for ozone, diesel fuels and other air pollutants. He organized and managed a collaboration to develop a federal plan to clean up the Great Lakes. He is also the co-author of an environmental policy called Enlibra.

==== Secretary of Health and Human Services ====
On December 13, 2004, Leavitt was nominated by Bush to succeed Tommy Thompson as Secretary of HHS, and was confirmed by the Senate by voice vote on January 26, 2005. He was commonly known for his advocating that Medicare was drifting toward financial insolvency.

Secretary Leavitt cited the work of the World Health Organization's Michael McCoy as the most compelling scientific work into the avian flu threat. This encouraged Leavitt to mobilize the nation's pandemic preparedness and led to the reconfiguring of the nation's medical emergency plans.

Leavitt also served on the Homeland Security Advisory Council. In August 2007, Leavitt became the first cabinet-level blogger in U.S. history.

==== Presidential transitions ====
During the 2012 presidential campaign, Leavitt was Chairman of the Transition Committee for Republican nominee Mitt Romney. This was the first time a Presidential transition had planned under the Presidential Transition Act of 2010. In August 2012, Politico reported Leavitt to be "creating a government-in-waiting plan for Mitt Romney" and "a lock for...White House chief of staff or Treasury secretary" in a potential Romney administration if he had won that year's presidential election against incumbent Barack Obama.

In 2014 and 2015, Leavitt advised Congress on how to improve the statutes governing presidential transitions. On December 18, 2015, the Edward "Ted" Kaufman and Michael Leavitt Presidential Transitions Improvements Act of 2015 was signed into law by President Barack Obama.

In the 2016 and 2020 presidential elections, Leavitt was part of a team organized by the Center for Public Service and the Center for Presidential Transition who advised both Republicans and Democrats' presidential campaigns on the development of effective transitions plans.

==== Electoral reform ====
In 2013, Leavitt partnered with former Utah first lady Norma Matheson and businesswoman Gail Miller to launch "Count My Vote", a bipartisan effort to push for state electoral reform. Together, they successfully lobbied for a new law allowing candidates access to the primary election ballot by gathering signatures in Utah.

=== Leavitt Partners ===
In 2009, Leavitt organized Leavitt Partners, a consulting firm to advise clients in health care policy matters. The firm evolved into a leading authority on value-based health care.

In April 2021, Leavitt Partners merged with Health Management Associates and Leavitt was appointed Co-Chairman of the combined firm.

=== Tabernacle Choir president ===
On August 6, 2021, Gérald Caussé, the LDS Church's presiding bishop, announced that Tabernacle Choir at Temple Square president Ron Jarrett was stepping down after nine years of service and that Leavitt would replace him in that role.

=== Leavitt Family Foundation controversy ===
Leavitt's family charitable foundation, the Dixie & Anne Leavitt Family Foundation, was established by the Leavitt family in 2000, and the family has donated nearly $9 million of assets to it since. It has provided them with tax write-offs for the donated assets. About a third of the foundation's assets have been loaned back to family businesses, such as a $332,000 loan to Leavitt Land and Investment Inc., in which Leavitt has an interest. According to a 2006 National Public Radio report, these loans were legal because they were made at market rates. A month following the NPR report, Congress made such transactions illegal.

The same NPR report revealed that nearly $500,000 in charitable contributions provided to the Southern Utah Foundation were used for housing scholarships to SUU. The scholarships were subsequently used to place students in the Cedar Development Co., a Leavitt family business, with the money used to pay the students' rent. NPR's investigation found that the arrangement was legal and that the Leavitts did not profit from the arrangement. Although legal, the procedure, called "round-tripping" in philanthropic circles, has garnered criticism as lacking in the spirit of philanthropy. The report also stated that Leavitt was not directly involved in the foundation's operations.

== Electoral history ==
- 1992 Race for Governor
  - Michael Leavitt (R), 42%
  - Merrill Cook (I), 34%
  - Stewart Hanson (D), 23%
- 1996 Race for Governor
  - Michael Leavitt (R) (inc.), 75%
  - Jim Bradley (D), 23%
- 2000 Race for Governor
  - Michael Leavitt (R) (inc.), 56%
  - Bill Orton (D), 42%

Party political offices
Preceded by Norm Bangerter	Republican nominee for Governor of Utah; 1992, 1996, 2000	Succeeded by Jon Huntsman
Preceded by Jock McKernan	Chair of the Republican Governors Association; 1994–1995	Succeeded by John Engler
Political offices
Preceded by Norm Bangerter	Governor of Utah; 1993–2003	Succeeded by Olene Walker
Preceded by Tom Carper	Chair of the National Governors Association; 1999–2000	Succeeded by Parris Glendening
Preceded by Christine Whitman	Administrator of the Environmental Protection Agency; 2003–2005	Succeeded by Stephen Johnson
Preceded by Tommy Thompson	United States Secretary of Health and Human Services; 2005–2009	Succeeded by Kathleen Sebelius
U.S. order of precedence (ceremonial)
Preceded by Mike Johanns as Former U.S. Cabinet Member	Order of precedence of the United States as Former U.S. Cabinet Member	Succeeded by Jim Nicholson as Former U.S. Cabinet Member
