= Property and casualty insurance guaranty funds =

Property and casualty insurance guaranty funds are part of the property and casualty guaranty fund system, a non-profit, state-based, statutorily-created insurance consumer protection system that protects policyholders if an insurer goes bankrupt.

Property and casualty guaranty funds step in to pay the covered claims (which would otherwise go partially or entirely unpaid) of policyholders of an insolvent insurer at levels determined by state law. This ensures policyholders and claimants at greatest risk are protected from the most severe consequences of an insurer's failure.

Colorado's guaranty fund statute summarizes the purpose of guaranty funds. The statute states that Colorado's guaranty fund "provide(s) a mechanism for the payment of covered claims under certain insurance policies, to avoid excessive delay in payment and financial loss to claimants or policyholders because of the insolvency of an insurer, to assist in the detection and prevention of insurer insolvencies, and to provide an association to assess the cost of such protection among insurers."

Most guaranty funds were created in the 1960s when academics, state insurance commissioners, and lawmakers sought ways to provide new levels of insurance policyholder protection.

Guaranty funds are active in every state, the District of Columbia, Puerto Rico, and the Virgin Islands. State laws require that all licensed property and casualty insurance companies belong to the guaranty funds in every state where the companies are licensed to do business.

A guaranty fund system also exists for the life, health, and annuity insurance industries, but operates independently from the property and casualty system.
