= 2018 Utah Proposition 4 =

2018 ballot measure in Utah

Proposition 4
- Utah Independent Redistricting Commission and Standards Act

Results
Choice	Votes	%
Yes	512,218	50.34%
No	505,274	49.66%
Total votes	1,017,492	100.00%

Yes
90–100%
80–90%
70–80%
60–70%
50–60%
No
90–100%
80–90%
70–80%
60–70%
50–60%

Utah Proposition 4 was a ballot measure approved as part of the 2018 Utah elections. The proposition created by statute an independent redistricting commission in the state, a measure to avoid gerrymandering.

== Results ==
Proposal 2
Choice	Votes	%
For	512,218	50.34
Against	505,274	49.66
Total	1,017,492	100.00
Registered voters/turnout	1,433,498	75.55

The proposal was approved narrowly, with 50.34% of the vote. The closeness of the result was hypothesized to be due to Republicans, the dominant party in Utah, voting against the proposition to maintain their total control over redistricting.

== Aftermath and litigation ==
In 2020, the Utah legislature passed Senate Bill 200 which allegedly compromised positions between Better Boundaries Utah (the sponsor of the proposition) and the Utah legislature.

Senate Bill 200 was challenged in state court on the grounds that it had violated the voters' intent in voting for Proposition 4. On July 11, 2024, the Utah Supreme Court unanimously sided with the plaintiffs in League of Women Voters v. Utah State Legislature, ruling that the legislature had overstepped their constitutional authority in passing SB200. The case was remanded to lower court to rule on the merits of the proposition, and a ruling in August 2025 restored the proposition in addition to ordering new maps to be drawn up by September 24. The Legislature responded by passing legislation which would have created two Republican-leaning congressional districts within the vicinity of Salt Lake County but would have impaired the ability of state judges to rule on maps demarcated by the Legislature. Utah County District Judge Dianna Gibson subsequently dismissed the Legislature's map in favor of a map drawn by plaintiffs which would create one strongly-Democratic district centered around Salt Lake County. The rejection was criticized by the Republican leaders of the Legislature, some of whom demanded impeachment of Gibson.

In 2026, the Republican Party started an effort to pass a referendum seeking a repeal of Proposition 4, which would allow the Utah legislature to vote on Proposition 4 (rather than the citizens of Utah directly). Passing the referendum requires signatures from eight percent of the voters from 26 of Utah's 29 state senate districts (at minimum). During the period of gathering the required signatures, some of the people who signed the petitions reported that they were misinformed about the nature of the referendum they were signing. Additionally, some signature gatherers were subject to hostile language and their signature packets forcibly taken or destroyed. Turning Point Action, a conservative partisan group, has helped to fund and organize signature drives in Utah. As a result of people withdrawing their signatures, the proposal ultimately failed to obtain enough signatures to qualify for the ballot.
