= Redistricting commission =

Body established to draw electoral district boundaries

Congressional redistricting methods by state after the 2020 census: Independent commission Politician commission Passed by legislature with gubernatorial approval Passed by legislature, governor plays no role Passed by legislature, simple majority veto override Not applicable due to having one at-large district: The Ohio Constitution requires that redistricting votes in the Ohio Legislature be bipartisan, with a minimum number of votes required from both parties for a redistricting act to pass; Legislative reversal of the redistricting commission created by 2018 Utah Proposition 4 is the subject of a constitutionality lawsuit.

Congressional redistricting methods by state after the 2010 census: State legislatures control redistricting Commissions control redistricting Nonpartisan staff develop the maps, which are then voted on by the state legislature No redistricting due to having only one congressional district

In the United States, a redistricting commission is a body, other than the usual state legislative bodies, established to draw electoral district boundaries. Generally the intent is to avoid gerrymandering, or at least the appearance of gerrymandering, by specifying a nonpartisan or bipartisan body to compose the commission that draws district boundaries.

== Nonpartisan or bipartisan commissions ==
As of 2010, 21 U.S. states have some form of non-partisan or bipartisan redistricting commission. Of these 21 states, 13 use redistricting commissions to exclusively draw electoral district boundaries (see below). A 14th state, Iowa, uses a special redistricting process that uses neither the state legislature nor an independent redistricting commission to draw electoral district boundaries (see below).

In 2015, the U.S. Supreme Court ruled in Arizona State Legislature v. Arizona Independent Redistricting Commission that redistricting commissions such as Arizona's, whose redistricting commission process is independent of the state legislature, were constitutional.

Table key

For purposes of these tables:

- Bipartisan means a substantial majority of the commission's membership is reserved for members of the two major U.S. political parties.
- Non-partisan means that either, a) the partisan makeup of the commission is not specified beforehand, or b) a substantial portion (i.e. more than one) of the membership of the commission is reserved for political independents or members of so-called third parties.

States currently with commissions or non-legislature systems for redistricting
Type	State & commission	Commission jurisdiction	Commission type & voting	No. of members	Member selection criteria & process	Legal authority
Commissions responsible for congressional & legislative redistricting	Arizona Independent Redistricting Commission	Congressional & legislative districts	Bipartisan; majority-rules	5	The commission on appellate court appointees creates a pool of 25 nominees, ten from each of the two largest parties and five not from either of the two largest parties. The highest-ranking officer of the House appoints one from the pool, then the minority leader of the House appoints one, then the highest-ranking officer of the Senate appoints one, then the minority leader of the Senate appoints one. These four appoint a fifth from the pool, not a member of any party already represented on the commission, as chair. If the four deadlock, the commission on appellate court appointments appoints the chair.	Arizona Constitution; Article 4, pt. 2, § 1
Commissions responsible for congressional & legislative redistricting	California Citizens Redistricting Commission	Congressional, legislative, BoE districts	Non-partisan; super-majority (majority of each group) needed	14	The commission was established in 2010 and consists of 14 members: 5 Democrats, 5 Republicans, and 4 members from neither party. Government auditors select 60 registered voters from an applicant pool. Legislative leaders can reduce the pool; the auditors then pick 8 commission members by lottery, and those commissioners pick six additional members for the 14 total. For approval, district boundaries need votes from 3 Democratic commissioners, 3 Republican commissioners, and 3 commissioners from neither party.	California Constitution; Article XXI
Commissions responsible for congressional & legislative redistricting	Hawaii	Congressional & legislative districts	Bipartisan; majority-rules	9	No commission member may run for the legislature in the two elections following redistricting. President of the Senate selects two; Speaker of the House selects two. Members of each house belonging to the party or parties different from that of the president or the speaker shall designate one of their number for each house, and the two so designated shall each select two [more?] members of the commission. These eight select the ninth member, who is the chair.	Hawaii Constitution; Article IV
Commissions responsible for congressional & legislative redistricting	Idaho	Congressional & legislative districts	Bipartisan; 2/3 super-majority required	6	Leaders of two largest political parties in each house of the legislature each designate one member; chairs of the two parties whose candidates for governor received the most votes in the last election each designate one member. No member may be an elected or appointed official in the state at the time of designation.	Idaho Constitution; Article III, § 2
Commissions responsible for congressional & legislative redistricting	Montana	Legislative & congressional districts	Bipartisan; majority-rules(?)	5	No member may be a public employee or official; members cannot run for public office in the two years after the completion of redistricting. Majority and minority leaders of both houses of the Legislature each select one member; those four select a fifth, who is the chair of the commission.	Montana Constitution; Article IV, § 14
Commissions responsible for congressional & legislative redistricting	New Jersey Redistricting Commission (Congressional) & Apportionment Commission (Legislative)	Congressional & legislative districts	Bipartisan; majority rules	Congressional: 13; Legislative: 10 (or 11)	Redistricting Commission: The commission has 13 members. The President of the Senate and Assembly Speaker each name two members; the minority leaders of both houses each name two members; and the state's Democratic and Republican party chairpersons each name two members. The 12 members then select a 13th "tie-breaking" member to chair the commission; if they cannot agree on the 13th member, then each party submits a name to the state's Supreme Court, which then chooses one of the submissions as the 13th member. Apportionment Commission: The chairs of the two major parties each select five members. If these 10 members cannot develop a plan in the allotted time, the chief justice of the state Supreme Court will appoint an 11th member.	New Jersey Constitution; Article II, Sec. II & Article IV, Sec. III
Commissions responsible for congressional & legislative redistricting	Washington State Redistricting Commission	Congressional & legislative districts	Bipartisan; majority (of 4) rules	5 (only 4 voting)	No elected official and no person elected to legislative district, county, or state political party office may serve on the commission. Majority and minority leaders of the House and Senate each select one member. These four select a non-voting fifth member to chair the commission. If they fail to do so by January 31, the state Supreme Court will select the fifth member within five days. No commission member may be a public official.	Washington Constitution; Article II, § 43
Commissions responsible for legislative redistricting only	Alaska	Legislative districts	Non-partisan; majority-rules	5	No member may be a public employee or official. Governor appoints two; president of the Senate appoints one; speaker of the House appoints one; chief justice of the Supreme Court appoints one. At least one member must be a resident of each judicial district.	Alaska Constitution; Article 6
Commissions responsible for legislative redistricting only	Arkansas	Legislative districts	Non-partisan; majority-rules	3	Commission consists of the state's governor, secretary of state, and attorney general.	Arkansas Constitution; Article 6
Commissions responsible for legislative redistricting only	Colorado	Legislative districts	Non-partisan; Colorado Supreme Court must approve	11	Legislature selects four: (speaker of the House; House minority leader; Senate majority and minority leaders; or their delegates). Governor selects three. Judiciary selects four. Maximum of four from the legislature. Each congressional district must have at least one person, but no more than two people representing it on the commission. At least one member must live west of the Continental Divide.	Colorado Constitution; Article 5, § 48
Commissions responsible for legislative redistricting only	Missouri	Legislative districts	Bipartisan; super-majorities required	Senate: 10; House: 18	No commission member may hold office in the legislature for four years after redistricting. There are two separate redistricting committees, one for each chamber of the legislature. Governor picks one person from each list of two submitted by the two main political parties in each congressional district to form the House committee; governor picks five people from two lists of 10 submitted by the two major political parties in the state to form the Senate committee.	Missouri Constitution; Article III, § 2 & § 7
Commissions responsible for legislative redistricting only	Ohio	Legislative districts	Non-partisan; majority rules	5	Board consists of the governor, auditor, secretary of state, and two people selected by the legislative leaders of each major political party.	Ohio Constitution; Article XI, § 1
Commissions responsible for legislative redistricting only	Pennsylvania	Legislative districts	Bipartisan; majority rules	5	Majority and minority leaders of the legislative houses each select one member. These four select a fifth to chair. If they fail to do so within 45 days, a majority of the state Supreme Court will select the fifth member. The chair cannot be a public official.	Pennsylvania Constitution; Article II, § 17

Iowa is a special case:

Redistricting process for Iowa
State	Redistricting jurisdiction	Redistricting type	Redistricting process	Legal authority
Iowa	Congressional & legislative districts	Non-partisan	Iowa conducts redistricting unlike any other state. The Iowa system does not put the task in the hands of a commission, but rather non-partisan legislative staff develop maps for the Iowa House and Senate, as well as U.S. House districts, without any political or election data (including the addresses of incumbents). A 5-person advisory commission is also formed. This is different from all other states. The redistricting plans from the non-partisan legislative staff are then presented to the Iowa legislature for a straight "Up" or "Down" vote; if the Legislature rejects the redistricting plans, the process starts over. (Eventually, the Iowa Supreme Court will enter the process if the Legislature fails to adopt a plan three times.) Detailed descriptions of the Iowa system are available from the Iowa legislature.	Iowa Constitution; Article III, § 37, and Article III, § 34, § 35, § 36 & § 38

Additionally, Maine and Vermont use advisory committees for redistricting. Connecticut, Illinois, Mississippi, Oklahoma, and Texas have backup redistricting commissions, if efforts at redistricting via the usual legislative process fail.

== 2021 redistricting ==
In 2021, following the 2020 census, a number of states will begin using new, non-partisan commissions or systems to redraw their legislative and/or congressional districts

States with planned new or changed systems for redistricting
Type	State	Commission jurisdiction	Commission type	No. of members	Appointment procedures and process	Ballot name
Commissions	Colorado	Congressional districts	Non-partisan	12	4 Republicans, 4 Democrats, 4 unaffiliated voters; every congressional district will be represented; half will be chosen randomly; half will be chosen by a panel of judges considering factors such as gender, geography, ethnicity District boundaries will be drawn by independent legislative staff. To approve a new map, eight of the 12 members must vote in favor of it, including at least 2 unaffiliated members.	Amendment Y (2018)
Commissions	Colorado	Legislative districts	Non-partisan	12	4 Republicans, 4 Democrats, 4 unaffiliated voters; every congressional district will be represented; half will be chosen randomly; half will be chosen by a panel of judges considering factors such as gender, geography, ethnicity District boundaries will be drawn by independent legislative staff. To approve a new map, eight of the 12 members must vote in favor of it, including at least 2 unaffiliated members.	Amendment Z (2018)
Commissions	Michigan	Congressional and legislative districts	Non-partisan	13	4 Republicans, 4 Democrats, and 5 members who identify with neither party; no member can be a partisan officeholder, an employee of such an officeholder, or a lobbyist Citizens can apply, and the Secretary of State picks 200 at random, with party and geographic diversity. Republican and Democratic leaders in the Michigan House and Senate can each reject five names, up to 20 in total. Then the Secretary of State picks the 13 members at random. The commission will have final say over the entire process of redistricting.	Proposal 2 (2018)
Commissions	New York	Congressional and legislative districts	Bipartisan	10	2 Members appointed by the Temporary President of the State Senate, 2 appointed by the Speaker of the Assembly, 2 appointed by the Minority leader of the State Senate, 2 appointed by the Minority leader of the Assembly, 2 appointed by the 8 legislatively appointed members. Neither member appointed by the 8 legislative appointees can be members of the 2 largest parties in the New York State Legislature. No member can be an elected partisan official, a partisan officer or employee, a lobbyist, be the chairman of a political party, or the spouse of a partisan elected official The commission must hold 12 open public meetings, and to create maps, that meet the standards in Article III, §4(c). The maps must then be voted on, by the legislature, and signed by the governor. In the event the legislature rejects, or the governor vetoes the initial plan, and this veto is not overridden by the legislature, the commission must be notified within 15 days of the rejection. If a second proposal is rejected by the legislature, or vetoed by the governor, and not overridden by the legislature, each house of the legislature retains the right to add any amendment, which shall comply with the provisions in the article, to the legislation, which is then sent to the governor, to be signed.	Proposal 1 (2014)
Commissions	Virginia	Congressional and legislative districts	Non-partisan	16	4 Republicans, 4 Democrats, (2 delegates and 2 senators from each party) and 8 citizens Citizens can apply, and then a panel of 5 retired judges selects. Congressional maps must be approved by 6 of 8 citizens and 6 of 8 legislators. The state legislative maps must be approved by 6 of 8 citizens and 6 of 8 legislators and 3 out of 4 legislators from the chamber whose maps is being drawn. The legislature must approve commission maps but cannot modify them. If the legislature rejects 2 maps or the commission fails to agree on a map the state supreme court draws the map.	Question 1 (2020)
Commissions	Utah	Congressional, legislative, and state school board districts	Non-partisan	7	1 member appointed by the governor; 3 appointed by the Republican leaders of the Utah legislature, 3 appointed by the Democratic leaders of the legislature; members cannot have participated in certain political activities for four or five years prior to their appointment The commission is required to hold open, public meetings and to create maps that meet the standards set out in Proposition 4. They would then send their proposal(s) to the state legislature, which can choose to accept or reject the map(s). The chief justice of the Utah Supreme Court will recommend one or more maps to the legislature. The legislature is still allowed to propose maps, but the commission retains the right to review them, and voters could sue to block the implementation of a plan in violation of Prop 4's requirements.	Proposition 4 (2018)
Non-commission processes	Ohio	Congressional districts	Bipartisan	a) entire legislature b) 7-member commission	Redistricted maps for congressional districts will require support of 60% of members in both the Ohio House and Senate, including 1/2 of members in the minority party. If the legislature cannot agree, a 7-member commission including the governor, auditor, secretary of state, and 4 legislators (2 from each party), will take responsibility. Should that commission be unable to reach an agreement, the legislature resumes control of the process, but will have lower thresholds for passing a plan (albeit with stricter rules).	Issue 1 (2018)

== See also ==
- Redistricting
- Boundary commissions (United Kingdom), four bodies in the United Kingdom having equivalent function to state redistricting commissions
