= I. Daniel Stewart =

American judge

Associate Justice of the Utah Supreme Court
- In office 1979–2000

Personal details
- Born: November 21, 1932
- Died: June 23, 2005 (aged 72)
- Education: University of Utah
- Profession: Judge

Isaac Daniel Stewart Jr. (November 21, 1932 – June 23, 2005) was a judge of the Utah Supreme Court from 1979 to 2000.

Stewart served a mission for the Church of Jesus Christ of Latter-day Saints in Germany. While there, in about 1956, he contracted polio which left him reliant on a wheelchair for the rest of his life.

Stewart earned a law degree from the University of Utah in 1962. He worked for the US government fighting trusts for a time and then became a law professor at the University of Utah.

Stewart was the lone dissenter from the 1993 Utah Supreme Court ruling that allowed prayers before government meetings as long as there was no religious restriction on who could give the prayer.

In addition, in the case Bagford v. Ephraim City, 904 P.2d 1095, he wrote the Court's opinion which concluded that creating a city-owned waste disposal company financed via municipal taxes was not a taking of private property even though it put the pre-existing waste-disposal company out of business.

== Sources ==
- Deseret News, May 10, 2000
- "Obituary for Stewart". Deseret News. June 25, 2005.
