= Leavitt Group =

- Company type: Private
- Industry: Insurance
- Founded: 1952; 74 years ago
- Founder: Dixie Leavitt
- Headquarters: Cedar City, Utah, United States
- Number of locations: 200+ (2023)
- Area served: United States
- Key people: Eric Leavitt (CEO); Vance Smith (president)
- Subsidiaries: Allegiance Premium Finance Co., LLC; PacWest Captive Insurance Company
- Website: leavitt.com

Leavitt Group (formerly The Leavitt Group) is an American insurance company that consists of a number of affiliated independent insurance agencies, with over 200 locations across the United States.

== History ==
The Leavitt Group was founded in 1952 when Dixie Leavitt opened an insurance agency in the town of Cedar City, Utah.

By 2010s it was among the largest retail property and casualty insurance brokerage firms in the United States. In 2009, The Leavitt Group was reported to be the 15th largest privately held property and casualty brokerage firms. In 2014 (based on 2013 total revenue), Insurance Journal ranked the Leavitt Group as the 10th largest, with $116 million property and casualty insurance revenue.

In 2022, the company was ranked the 17th largest, with $262 million property and casualty insurance revenue and $121 other revenue.
