= Utah Democratic Party =

Utah affiliate of the Democratic Party

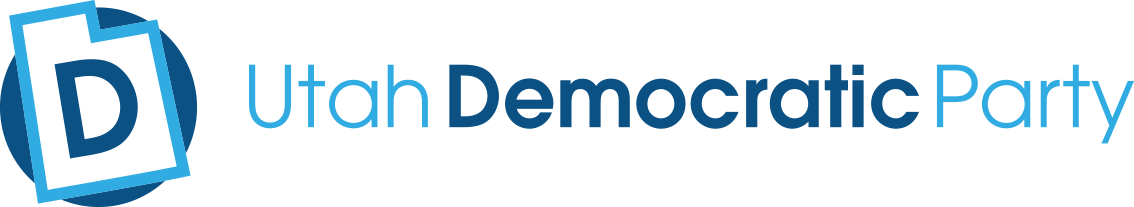
- Chairperson: Brian King
- Senate Minority Leader: Luz Escamilla
- House Minority Leader: Angela Romero
- Headquarters: Salt Lake City
- Membership (2025): ▲242,043
- National affiliation: Democratic Party
- Colors: Blue
- Seats in the United States Senate: 0 / 2
- Seats in the U.S. House of Representatives: 0 / 4
- Seats in the Utah Senate: 6 / 29
- Seats in the Utah House of Representatives: 14 / 75

Election symbol

Website
- www.utahdemocrats.org

The Utah Democratic Party (UDP) is the affiliate of the Democratic Party in the U.S. state of Utah.

It has minimal political power in the state. It controls none of Utah's statewide or federal elected offices, and is in the superminority in both chambers of the Utah State Legislature. Democrats last received Utah's electoral votes in 1964.

== History ==
The Democratic Party originated around 1884 in Utah. In 1896, more than 80 percent of the state vote went toward William Jennings Bryan, a Democrat, and the state elected several Democrats to state and local offices. The Democratic legislature elected Joseph L. Rawlins to serve as a U.S. Senator and William H. King to the House.

Reed Smoot had a political alliance with the Mormons and Gentiles that helped the Republican Party to gain power. The Democrats did not have as much power after 1900, although in 1924, Democratic legislator George Dern beat the incumbent Republican Governor Charles Mabey winning on the slogan, "We Want a Dern Good Governor and We Don't Mean Mabey".

In the 1930s, the Democrats had more success. President Franklin D. Roosevelt selected Governor Dern as the Secretary of War. Elbert D. Thomas beat incumbent Reed Smoot in the Senate and served until 1950. Herbert B. Maw was elected to the state senate in 1928. He then became the President of the Utah Senate. They passed bills dealing with unemployment assistance and they created an open primary law.

Maw was elected governor in 1940 and was reelected in 1944, but lost in 1948. In the same year, Reva Beck Bosone was elected to the House of Representatives as a Democrat. She was the first woman from Utah to be elected to Congress.

In 1958, Frank E. "Ted" Moss was elected to the U.S. Senate and remained there until the 1970s. Cal Rampton, a moderate Democrat, was elected governor in 1964.

In 1972, Jean Westwood became the Chair of the Democratic National Committee. She was the first woman to hold this position in either major political party. As of 2025, no other Utahn has chaired the DNC.

The Utah Democratic Party struggled through the end of the 1970s and most of the 1980s. In 1986, Wayne Owens was elected to Utah's 2nd congressional district, and in 1992, Bill Orton was elected to Congress from Utah's 3rd congressional district. The UDP still remains a clear minority in state politics.

Beverly White, the longest serving woman in the Utah State Legislature, was a member of the Democratic Party.

The party's platform focuses on economic security, equal opportunity, the common good, and American leadership.

== Current elected officials ==
=== Members of Congress ===
==== U.S. Senate ====
- None

Both of Utah's senate seats have been held by Republicans since 1976. Frank Moss was the last Democrat to represent Utah in the United States Senate.

==== U.S. House of Representatives ====
District	Member	Photo
1st	Ben McAdams (elect)	

Utah has been represented in the U.S. House exclusively by Republicans since 2021. Ben McAdams was the last Democrat to hold a Utah U.S. House seat.

=== Statewide offices ===
- None. Attorney General Jan Graham was the last Democrat to hold statewide office in Utah, from 1993 to 2001.

=== State Legislature ===
- Senate Minority Leader: Luz Escamilla
- Senate Minority Whip: Karen Kwan
- Assistant Minority Whip: Jennifer Plumb
- House Minority Leader: Angela Romero
- House Minority Whip: Jennifer Dailey-Provost
- Assistant Minority Whip: Sahara Hayes

=== Mayors ===
- Salt Lake City: Erin Mendenhall

== State party organization ==
=== Party executive officers ===
Office	Office-holder
Chair	Brian King
Vice Chair	Susan Merrill
Secretary	Brad Dickter
Treasurer	Catherine Voutaz
Executive Director	Jade Velazquez
National Committee Member	Clare Collard
National Committee Member	Brad Townley

=== State-party caucuses ===
The Utah Democratic Party recognizes 18 statewide caucuses. Each caucus promotes issues related to its mission:

- Asian/Pacific Islander Caucus
- Black Caucus
- College Democrats
- Disability Caucus
- Education Caucus
- Environmental Caucus
- Healthcare Caucus
- Hispanic Caucus
- Labor Caucus
- LDS Caucus
- Native American Caucus
- Progressive Caucus
- Rural Caucus
- Senior Caucus
- Utah Stonewall Democrats
- Veterans Caucus
- Women's Caucus
- Young Democrats of Utah

== Notable members ==
=== Governors ===
- Simon Bamberger
- George Henry Dern
- Henry Hooper Blood
- Herbert Brown Maw
- Calvin Lewellyn Rampton
- Scott Milne Matheson

=== Senators ===
- Joseph L. Rawlins
- William H. King
- Elbert D. Thomas
- Orrice Abram Murdock Jr.
- Frank E. Moss

=== Representatives ===
- William H. King
- Brigham Henry Roberts
- Milton H. Welling
- James Henry Mays
- Abe Murdock
- J. W. Robinson
- Walter K. Granger
- Reva Beck Bosone
- M. Blaine Peterson
- David S. King
- K. Gunn McKay
- Wayne Owens
- Allan Turner Howe
- Karen Shepherd
- William Orton
- Jim Matheson
- Ben McAdams

== Election results ==
=== Federal ===
==== Presidential ====
Utah Democratic Party presidential election results
Election	Presidential ticket	Votes	Vote %	Electoral votes	Result
1896	William Jennings Bryan/Arthur Sewall	64,610	82.70%	3 / 3	Lost
1900	William Jennings Bryan/Adlai E. Stevenson	45,006	48.30%	0 / 3	Lost
1904	Alton B. Parker/Henry G. Davis	33,413	32.86%	0 / 3	Lost
1908	William Jennings Bryan/John W. Kern	42,637	39.19%	0 / 3	Lost
1912	Woodrow Wilson/Thomas R. Marshall	36,579	32.58%	0 / 4	Won
1916	Woodrow Wilson/Thomas R. Marshall	84,145	58.78%	4 / 4	Won
1920	James M. Cox/Franklin D. Roosevelt	56,639	38.84%	0 / 4	Lost
1924	John W. Davis/Charles W. Bryan	47,001	29.94%	0 / 4	Lost
1928	Al Smith/Joseph T. Robinson	80,985	45.86%	0 / 4	Lost
1932	Franklin D. Roosevelt/John N. Garner	116,750	56.52%	4 / 4	Won
1936	Franklin D. Roosevelt/John N. Garner	150,246	69.34%	4 / 4	Won
1940	Franklin D. Roosevelt/Henry A. Wallace	154,277	62.25%	4 / 4	Won
1944	Franklin D. Roosevelt/Harry S. Truman	150,088	60.44%	4 / 4	Won
1948	Harry S. Truman/Alben W. Barkley	149,151	53.98%	4 / 4	Won
1952	Adlai Stevenson/John Sparkman	135,364	41.07%	0 / 4	Lost
1956	Adlai Stevenson/Estes Kefauver	118,364	35.44%	0 / 4	Lost
1960	John F. Kennedy/Lyndon B. Johnson	169,248	45.17%	0 / 4	Won
1964	Lyndon B. Johnson/Hubert Humphrey	219,628	54.86%	4 / 4	Won
1968	Hubert Humphrey/Edmund Muskie	156,665	37.07%	0 / 4	Lost
1972	George McGovern/Sargent Shriver	126,284	26.39%	0 / 4	Lost
1976	Jimmy Carter/Walter Mondale	182,110	33.65%	0 / 4	Won
1980	Jimmy Carter/Walter Mondale	124,266	20.57%	0 / 4	Lost
1984	Walter Mondale/Geraldine Ferraro	155,369	24.68%	0 / 5	Lost
1988	Michael Dukakis/Lloyd Bentsen	297,343	32.05%	0 / 5	Lost
1992	Bill Clinton/Al Gore	183,429	24.65%	0 / 5	Won
1996	Bill Clinton/Al Gore	221,633	33.30%	0 / 5	Won
2000	Al Gore/Joe Lieberman	203,053	26.34%	0 / 5	Lost
2004	John Kerry/John Edwards	241,199	26.00%	0 / 5	Lost
2008	Barack Obama/Joe Biden	327,670	34.22%	0 / 5	Won
2012	Barack Obama/Joe Biden	251,813	24.69%	0 / 6	Won
2016	Hillary Clinton/Tim Kaine	310,676	27.46%	0 / 6	Lost
2020	Joe Biden/Kamala Harris	560,282	37.65%	0 / 6	Won
2024	Kamala Harris/Tim Walz	562,566	37.79%	0 / 6	Lost

==== U.S. Senate ====
Class 1
Year	Candidate	Votes	%	Result
1970	Frank Moss	210,207	56.16%	Won ✓
1976	Frank Moss	241,948	44.80%	Lost ✗
1982	Ted Wilson	219,482	41.35%	Lost ✗
1988	Brian Moss	203,364	31.74%	Lost ✗
1994	Patrick Shea	146,938	28.30%	Lost ✗
2000	Scott Howell	242,569	31.51%	Lost ✗
2006	Pete Ashdown	177,459	31.06%	Lost ✗
2012	Scott Howell	301,873	29.98%	Lost ✗
2018	Jenny Wilson	328,541	30.91%	Lost ✗
2024	Caroline Gleich	464,515	31.74%	Lost ✗

Class 3
Year	Candidate	Votes	%	Result
1968	Milton L. Weilenmann	192,168	45.83%	Lost ✗
1974	Wayne Owens	185,377	44.07%	Lost ✗
1980	Dan Berman	151,454	25.49%	Lost ✗
1986	Craig S. Oliver	115,523	26.55%	Lost ✗
1992	Wayne Owens	301,228	39.72%	Lost ✗
1998	Scott Leckman	177,459	32.97%	Lost ✗
2004	Paul Van Dam	258,955	28.40%	Lost ✗
2010	Sam Granato	207,685	32.77%	Lost ✗
2016	Misty Snow	301,860	27.06%	Lost ✗
2022	Endorsed Evan McMullin (Independent)			Lost ✗

==== U.S. House ====
Election	Votes	%	Seats (UT)	±	%
2016	356,287	31.98	0 / 4	0	0.44
2018	374,009	35.54	1 / 4	▲1	3.65
2020	505,946	35.33	0 / 4	▼1	0.21
2022	342,021	32.20	0 / 4	0	3.13
2024	471,051	32.52	0 / 4	0	0.32
2026	459,077	46.18	1 / 4	▲1	13.66

=== State ===
==== Executive offices ====
Governor
Election	Gubernatorial candidate/ticket	Votes	Vote %	Result
1895	John Thomas Caine	18,519	44.73%	Lost ✗
1900	James Moyle	37,152	48.02%	Lost ✗
1904	James Moyle	38,047	37.40%	Lost ✗
1908	Jesse Knight	43,266	38.80%	Lost ✗
1912	John Franklin Tolton	36,076	32.36%	Lost ✗
1916	Simon Bamberger	78,502	55.12%	Won ✓
1920	Thomas N. Taylor	54,913	38.78%	Lost ✗
1924	George Dern	81,308	52.99%	Won ✓
1928	George Dern	102,953	58.50%	Won ✓
1932	Henry H. Blood	116,031	56.39%	Won ✓
1936	Henry H. Blood	109,656	64.59%	Won ✓
1940	Herbert B. Maw	128,519	52.07%	Won ✓
1944	Herbert B. Maw	123,907	50.21%	Won ✓
1948	Herbert B. Maw	123,814	45.01%	Lost ✗
1952	Earl J. Glade	147,188	44.92%	Lost ✗
1956	L.C. "Rennie" Romney	111,297	33.43%	Lost ✗
1960	William Arthur Barlocker	175,855	47.34%	Lost ✗
1964	Cal Rampton	226,956	56.99%	Won ✓
1968	Cal Rampton	289,283	68.71%	Won ✓
1972	Cal Rampton	331,998	69.69%	Won ✓
1976	Scott M. Matheson	280,706	52.02%	Won ✓
1980	Scott M. Matheson	330,974	55.16%	Won ✓
1984	Wayne Owens	275,669	43.78%	Lost ✗
1988	Ted Wilson	249,321	38.41%	Lost ✗
1992	Stewart Hanson/Paula Julander	117,181	23.24%	Lost ✗
1996	Jim Bradley/Shari Holweg	156,616	23.31%	Lost ✗
2000	Bill Orton/Karen Hale	321,979	42.27%	Lost ✗
2004	Scott Matheson Jr./Karen Hale	380,359	41.35%	Lost ✗
2008	Bob Springmeyer/Josie Valdez	186,503	19.72%	Lost ✗
2010 (special)	Peter Corroon/Sheryl Allen	205,246	31.90%	Lost ✗
2012	Peter Cooke/Vincent Rampton	277,622	27.58%	Lost ✗
2016	Mike Weinholtz/Kim Bowman	323,349	28.74%	Lost ✗
2020	Christopher Peterson/Karina Brown	442,754	30.35%	Lost ✗
2024	Brian King/Rebekah Cummings	420,514	28.46%	Lost ✗

== County party organization ==
Each of Utah's 29 Counties has a party organization, which operates within that county and sends state delegates to the Utah Democratic Party's state convention each year. Delegates are selected at caucus meetings held on the third Tuesday of March in election years (even numbered years) and serve two year terms. In April, county delegates selected at the March caucus meetings gather at their respective county conventions to select state delegates and nominate county candidates or state legislative candidates where the legislative district is entirely within their county.

The Utah Democratic Party's state convention is typically held within the first two weeks of May following these county conventions in election years, but may be held later in odd numbered years. At state conventions state delegates vote to determine the party's nominees in federal races or in state races where the district crosses county lines in what is referred to as a "nominating convention." A candidate must receive at least 55% of the vote at the nominating convention to become the party's nominee. If a candidate falls short of this goal the nominee is determined through a primary. In Utah, Democratic primaries are open to all registered voters, but a registered voter may only participate in one party's primary. The Republican primary is closed to all but registered Republicans (Unaffiliated registered voters may change their affiliation on election day to vote in a Republican primary.)

In odd numbered years county and state delegates gather at county organizing conventions and the state organizing convention respectively to determine their county and state party leadership. Positions up for election at these conventions are party chair, vice chair, secretary and treasurer. Together these offices make up the executive officers of the respective county parties and the Utah Democratic Party. A simple majority is sufficient to elect someone to each of these positions, though it may take multiple ballots in order to receive a majority of the delegates' votes. All county party chairs and vice chairs are automatically assigned to the Utah Democratic Party's central committee. Counties may have additional representatives in this body depending upon population.

== See also ==
- Democratic Party
- Utah Republican Party
- Utah Libertarian Party
