= Utah Republican Party =

- Chairperson: Rob Axson
- Vice Chairperson: Melanie Monestere
- Secretary: Stafford Palmieri
- Treasurer: Jason Knavel
- House leader: Mike Schultz
- Senate leader: J. Stuart Adams
- Founded: 1854
- Preceded by: Whig Party; Free Soil Party
- Headquarters: 117 E. South Temple; Salt Lake City, Utah 84111
- Membership (2024): ▼902,296
- Ideology: Conservatism
- National affiliation: Republican Party
- Colors: Red
- Seats in the United States Senate: 2 / 2
- Seats in the United States House of Representatives: 4 / 4
- Seats in the Utah Senate: 22 / 29
- Seats in the Utah House of Representatives: 61 / 75

Election symbol

Website
- www.utgop.org

The Utah Republican Party is the affiliate of the Republican Party in the U.S. state of Utah. It is currently the dominant party in the state, and has been for almost all of its history. It currently holds Utah's entire congressional delegation, all statewide executive offices, and supermajorities in both state legislative chambers.

== History ==
The state of Utah politics was reorganized after the 1890 Manifesto led by Wilford Woodruff. The 1890 Manifesto officially ended the traditionally Mormon practice of Polygamy. Many prominent polygamist Mormons were imprisoned, punished and harassed since the 1890 Manifesto prohibited plural marriage. This action granted the Utah Territory statehood in 1896 on the condition that polygamy was banned in the state constitution. The Republican Frank J. Cannon was the first delegate elected to congress by the state of Utah in 1894.

Although Utah was generally considered a Democratic-leaning area (or an area that would lean Democratic) before statehood, the state of Utah rapidly gained overwhelming support for the Republican Party after 1896. Although the Republican Party had been strongly opposed to polygamy since its inception and had played a major part in abolishing polygamy, the Republican U.S. Senator Reed Smoot rose to political power. Smoot led a political alliance of Mormons and non-Mormons that created a strong Republican party in many parts of the state.

The Republican Party is currently dominant in Utah politics: no Democrat has won statewide office since 1996, when Jan Graham was elected attorney general; and when Mia Love replaced Jim Matheson in congress in 2014, Utah's congressional delegation became all-Republican. When Love lost her seat to Ben McAdams in the 2018 election, Democrats regained one of Utah's four seats. After the 2020 election Ben McAdams lost his seat to Burgess Owens and Utah's congressional delegation became all-Republican again.

== Current elected officials ==
The Utah Republican Party controls all five statewide offices and holds a supermajority in the Utah House of Representatives and the Utah State Senate. Republicans also hold both of the state's U.S. Senate seats and all four of the state's U.S. House seats.

=== Members of Congress ===
==== U.S. Senate ====
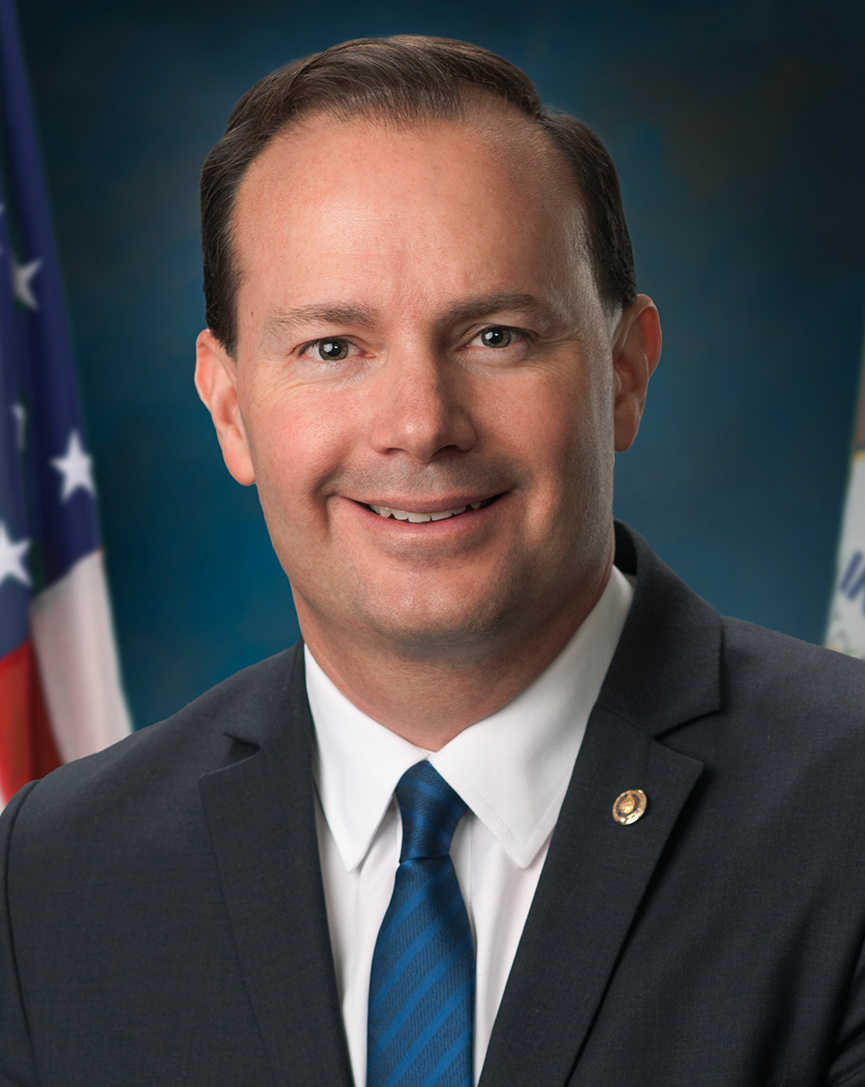
Senior U.S. Senator Mike Lee

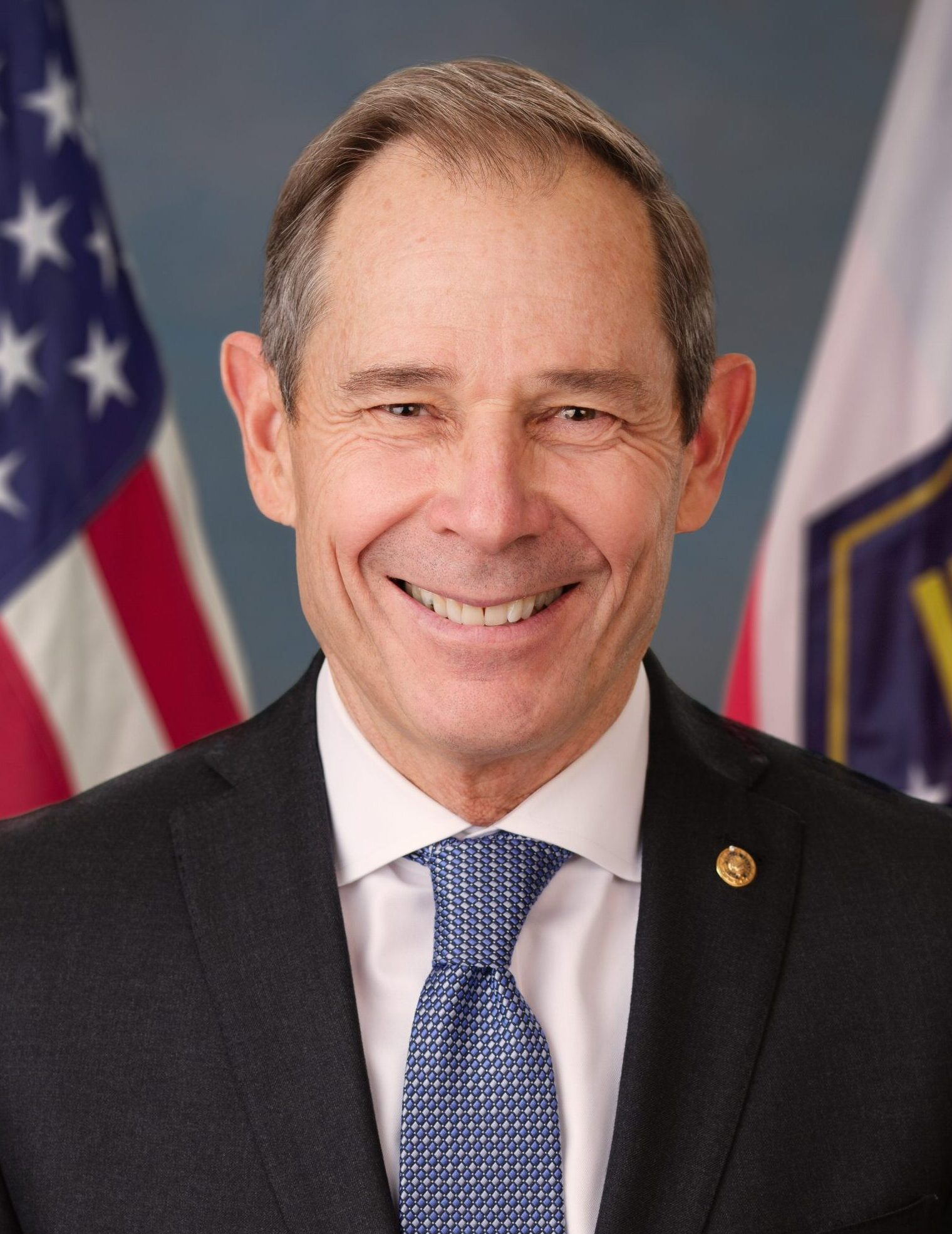
Junior U.S. Senator John Curtis

==== U.S. House of Representatives ====
District	Member	Photo
1st → 2nd	Blake Moore	
2nd → 3rd	Celeste Maloy	
3rd → 4th	Mike Kennedy	
4th	Burgess Owens	

=== Statewide offices ===
- Governor: Spencer Cox
- Lieutenant Governor: Deidre Henderson
- Attorney General: Derek Brown
- State Treasurer: Marlo Oaks
- State Auditor: Tina Cannon

=== State Legislature ===
- President of the Senate: J. Stuart Adams
  - Senate Majority Leader: Kirk Cullimore
- Speaker of the House: Mike Schultz
  - House Majority Leader: Casey Snider

== State party organization ==
Office	Office-holder
Chair	Robert Axson
Vice Chair	Melanie Monestere
Secretary	Stafford Palmieri
Treasurer	Jason Knavel

In off-election years, the Utah Republican Party holds organizing conventions where state delegates elect a chair, vice-chair, secretary, and treasurer. State party officers serve two-year terms.

=== Central Committee ===
The State Central Committee (SCC) has representatives from every county in Utah. Along with the automatic members, each county chair and vice-chair, counties are allocated representatives based on the number of voting republicans in that county. These representatives are elected at Republican county conventions in odd-numbered years.

=== Auxiliaries ===
The Utah Republican Party has seven registered auxiliaries. This list includes: Utah Elephant Club, Utah Federation of Republican Women, Utah Young Republicans, Utah Federation of College Republicans, Utah Native American Caucus, Utah Republican Women's Liberty Caucus, and Utah Republican Veterans' Caucus.

== Utah Federation of College Republicans ==
The Utah Federation of College Republicans (UFCR) is a state-level organization in Utah that oversees College Republican chapters at colleges and universities across the state. It is affiliated with the College Republicans of America (CRA), a national organization established in 2023, and works to promote conservative values, support Republican candidates, and engage college students in political activism. The UFCR operates as an official auxiliary of the Utah Republican Party; it collaborates closely with the state party to advance shared goals.

The UFCR holds chapters at Brigham Young University, University of Utah, Utah State University, Weber State University, and more.

== Election results ==
=== Presidential ===
Utah Republican Party presidential election results
Election	Presidential ticket	Votes	Vote %	Electoral votes	Result
1896	William McKinley/Garret Hobart	13,491	17.27%	0 / 3	Won
1900	William McKinley/Theodore Roosevelt	47,139	50.65%	3 / 3	Won
1904	Theodore Roosevelt/Charles W. Fairbanks	62,452	61.41%	3 / 3	Won
1908	William Howard Taft/James S. Sherman	61,165	56.23%	3 / 3	Won
1912	William Howard Taft/Nicholas M. Butler	42,013	37.42%	4 / 4	Lost
1916	Charles E. Hughes/Charles W. Fairbanks	54,137	37.82%	0 / 4	Lost
1920	Warren G. Harding/Calvin Coolidge	81,555	55.93%	4 / 4	Won
1924	Calvin Coolidge/Charles G. Dawes	77,327	49.26%	4 / 4	Won
1928	Herbert Hoover/Charles Curtis	94,618	58.58%	4 / 4	Won
1932	Herbert Hoover/Charles Curtis	84,795	41.05%	0 / 4	Lost
1936	Alf Landon/Frank Knox	64,555	29.79%	0 / 4	Lost
1940	Wendell Willkie/Charles L. McNary	93,151	37.59%	0 / 4	Lost
1944	Thomas E. Dewey/John W. Bricker	97,891	39.42%	0 / 4	Lost
1948	Thomas E. Dewey/Earl Warren	124,402	45.02%	0 / 4	Lost
1952	Dwight D. Eisenhower/Richard Nixon	194,190	58.93%	4 / 4	Won
1956	Dwight D. Eisenhower/Richard Nixon	215,631	64.56%	4 / 4	Won
1960	Richard Nixon/Henry Cabot Lodge Jr.	205,361	54.81%	4 / 4	Lost
1964	Barry Goldwater/William E. Miller	180,682	45.14%	0 / 4	Lost
1968	Richard Nixon/Spiro Agnew	238,728	56.49%	4 / 4	Won
1972	Richard Nixon/Spiro Agnew	323,643	67.64%	4 / 4	Won
1976	Gerald Ford/Bob Dole	337,908	62.44%	4 / 4	Lost
1980	Ronald Reagan/George H. W. Bush	439,687	72.77%	4 / 4	Won
1984	Ronald Reagan/George H. W. Bush	469,105	74.50%	5 / 5	Won
1988	George H. W. Bush/Dan Quayle	428,442	66.22%	5 / 5	Won
1992	George H. W. Bush/Dan Quayle	322,332	43.36%	5 / 5	Lost
1996	Bob Dole/Jack Kemp	361,911	54.37%	5 / 5	Lost
2000	George W. Bush/Dick Cheney	515,096	66.83%	5 / 5	Won
2004	George W. Bush/Dick Cheney	663,742	71.54%	5 / 5	Won
2008	John McCain/Sarah Palin	596,030	62.24%	5 / 5	Lost
2012	Mitt Romney/Paul Ryan	740,600	72.62%	6 / 6	Lost
2016	Donald Trump/Mike Pence	515,231	45.54%	6 / 6	Won
2020	Donald Trump/Mike Pence	865,140	58.16%	6 / 6	Lost
2024	Donald Trump/JD Vance	883,818	59.38%	6 / 6	Won

=== Gubernatorial ===
Utah Republican Party gubernatorial election results
Election	Gubernatorial candidate/ticket	Votes	Vote %	Result
1895	Heber Manning Wells	20,833	50.32%	Won ✓
1900	Heber Manning Wells	40,209	51.98%	Won ✓
1904	John Christopher Cutler	50,837	49.97%	Won ✓
1908	William Spry	52,913	47.45%	Won ✓
1912	William Spry	42,552	38.17%	Won ✓
1916	Nephi L. Morris	59,529	41.80%	Lost ✗
1920	Charles R. Mabey	81,550	57.59%	Won ✓
1924	Charles R. Mabey	72,127	47.01%	Lost ✗
1928	William H. Wattis	72,306	41.08%	Lost ✗
1932	William W. Seegmiller	85,913	41.76%	Lost ✗
1936	Ray E. Dillman	60,118	35.41%	Lost ✗
1940	Don B. Colton	117,713	47.69%	Lost ✗
1944	J. Bracken Lee	122,851	49.79%	Lost ✗
1948	J. Bracken Lee	151,253	54.99%	Won ✓
1952	J. Bracken Lee	180,516	55.09%	Won ✓
1956	George Dewey Clyde	127,164	38.20%	Won ✓
1960	George Dewey Clyde	195,634	52.66%	Won ✓
1964	Mitchell Melich	171,300	43.01%	Lost ✗
1968	Carl W. Buehner	131,729	31.29%	Lost ✗
1972	Nicholas L. Strike	144,449	30.31%	Lost ✗
1976	Vernon B. Romney	248,027	45.96%	Lost ✗
1980	Bob Wright	266,578	44.43%	Lost ✗
1984	Norman H. Bangerter	351,792	55.87%	Won ✓
1988	Norman H. Bangerter	260,462	40.13%	Won ✓
1992	Mike Leavitt/Olene Walker	321,713	42.19%	Won ✓
1996	Mike Leavitt/Olene Walker	503,693	74.97%	Won ✓
2000	Mike Leavitt/Olene Walker	424,837	55.77%	Won ✓
2004	Jon Huntsman Jr./Gary Herbert	531,190	57.74%	Won ✓
2008	Jon Huntsman Jr./Gary Herbert	735,049	77.63%	Won ✓
2010 (special)	Gary Herbert/Greg Bell	412,151	64.07%	Won ✓
2012	Gary Herbert/Greg Bell	688,592	68.41%	Won ✓
2016	Gary Herbert/Spencer Cox	750,850	66.74%	Won ✓
2020	Spencer Cox/Deidre Henderson	918,754	62.98%	Won ✓
2024	Spencer Cox/Deidre Henderson	781,431	52.89%	Won ✓

== Right of Association Legal Appeal ==
The State Central Committee (SCC) is the governing body of the party. In 2014 the state legislature passed SB54 which created a pathway by which candidates from all parties in Utah could bypass the nominating conventions and qualify directly for the primary ballot by collecting a required number of signatures.

SB54 forced the parties in Utah to have open primaries, among other demands. The SCC directed its party chairman, James Evans, to file a lawsuit, which sought, among other things, to overturn the use of open primaries. The Utah Republican Party prevailed on this point, which required the state elections office to defer to the Utah Republican Party as to whether the primary would be open or closed and whether unaffiliated voters would be eligible to sign ballot-access petitions for Republican candidates.

The party filed two more lawsuits to try to overturn SB54's signature path to the ballot, but lost those cases. They appealed to the 10th Circuit Court which upheld the lower courts ruling and a subsequent appeal to the US Supreme Court was denied.

=== State Party Caucuses ===
Party Caucuses are held every two years in Utah.

== County party organizations ==
Each of Utah's 29 counties has a party organization, which operates within that county and sends delegates to the State Central Committee.

County Party	Website
Cache	http://cachegop.com/
Davis	http://www.davisgop.org/
Morgan	http://www.morganutahgop.org/
Salt Lake	http://www.slcogop.com
Sanpete	http://www.sanpetecountyrepublicans.com
Summit	http://www.summitcountygop.org
Utah	http://ucrp.org
Weber	https://www.webergop.org

== See also ==
- Republican Party
- Democratic Party of Utah
- Libertarian Party of Utah
