= List of governors of Utah =

Governor of Utah
- Seal of the Governor

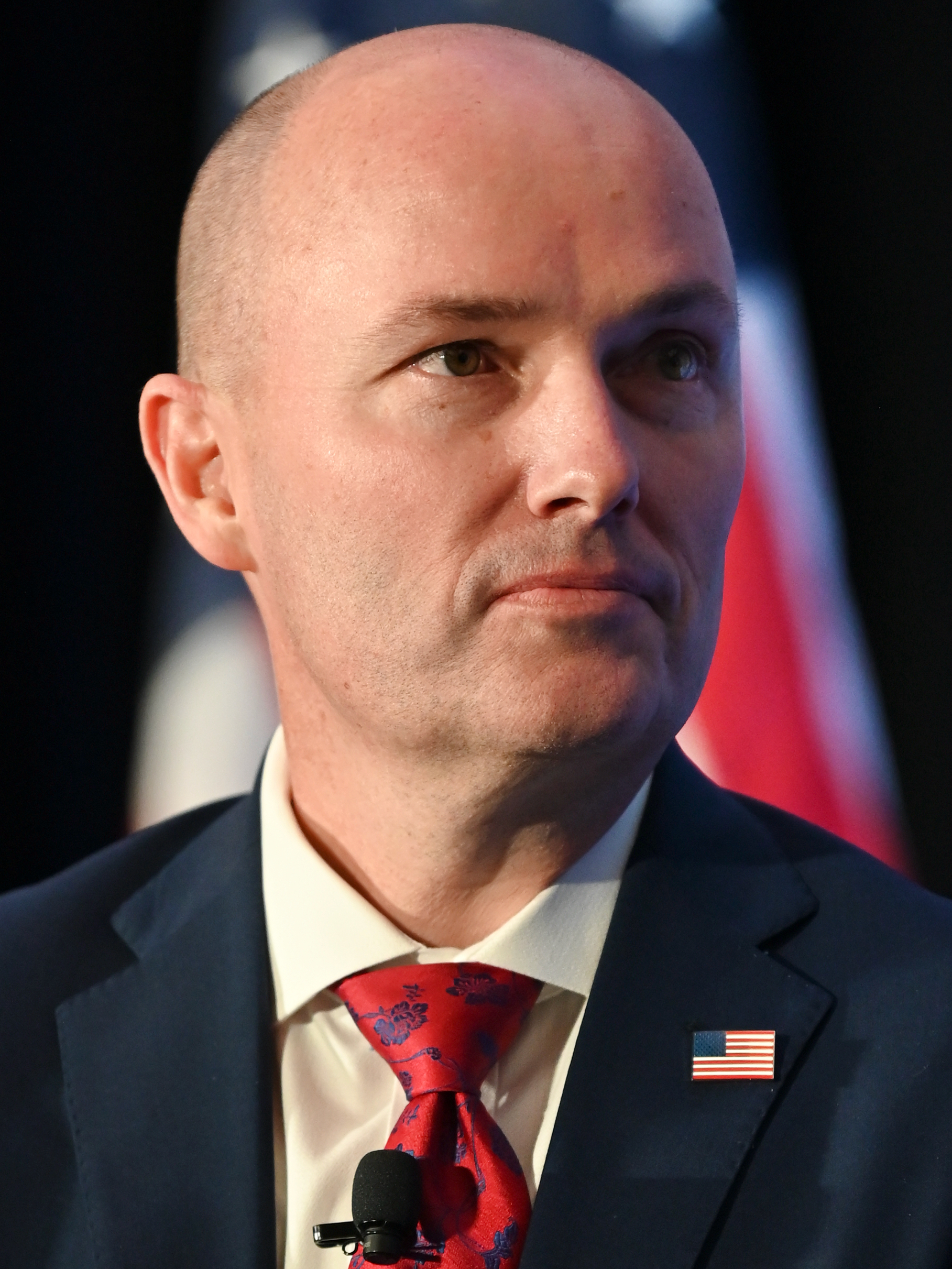
- Incumbent; Spencer Cox since January 4, 2021
- Style: The Honorable
- Residence: Utah Governor's Mansion
- Term length: Four years, renewable, no term limits
- Inaugural holder: Heber Manning Wells
- Formation: January 6, 1896
- Succession: Line of succession
- Deputy: Lieutenant Governor of Utah
- Salary: $150,000 (2019)
- Website: governor.utah.gov

The governor of Utah is the head of government of Utah and the commander-in-chief of its military forces. The governor has a duty to enforce state laws as well as the power to either approve or veto bills passed by the Utah Legislature. The governor may also convene the legislature on "extraordinary occasions".

The self-proclaimed State of Deseret, precursor to the organization of the Utah Territory, had only one governor, Brigham Young. Utah Territory had fifteen territorial governors from its organization in 1850 until the formation of the state of Utah in 1896, appointed by the President of the United States. John W. Dawson had the shortest term of only three weeks and Brigham Young, the first territorial governor, had the longest term at seven years.

There have been eighteen governors of the State of Utah, with the longest serving being Cal Rampton, who served three terms from 1965 to 1977. Olene Walker served the shortest term, the remaining 14 months of Mike Leavitt's term upon Leavitt's resignation to become head of the Environmental Protection Agency. At the age of 36, Heber Manning Wells was the youngest person to become governor. At the age of 70, Simon Bamberger became the oldest person to be elected, while Olene Walker, at age 72, was the oldest person to succeed to the office.

J. Bracken Lee was the most recent of three Governors of Utah who was not a member of the Church of Jesus Christ of Latter-day Saints (LDS Church), the other two being Simon Bamberger and George Dern.

Currently, a term of service is set at four years, and there are no overall limits (consecutive or lifetime) to the number of terms one may be elected to serve. Elections for the office of Governor of Utah are normally held in November of the same year as the United States presidential election.

The current governor is Spencer Cox, who took office on January 4, 2021. Governor Cox was elected in November 2020.

== Qualifications ==
Anyone who seeks to be elected Governor of Utah must meet the following qualifications:

- Be at least 30 years old
- Be a resident of Utah for at least five years on the day of the election
- Be a United States citizen
- Be a qualified elector of Utah at the time of election

== List of governors ==
The area that became Utah was part of the Mexican Cession obtained by the United States on May 19, 1848, in the Treaty of Guadalupe Hidalgo following the Mexican–American War.

=== State of Deseret ===
A constitutional convention was convened in Salt Lake City on March 8, 1849, to work on a proposal for federal recognition of a state or territory. The convention resulted in the provisional State of Deseret. Deseret claimed most of present-day Utah, Nevada and Arizona, with parts of California, Colorado, Idaho, New Mexico, Oregon, and Wyoming. Brigham Young was elected governor on March 12, 1849, and the legislature first met on July 2, 1849. The state, having never been recognized by the federal government, was formally dissolved on April 5, 1851, several months after word of the creation of Utah Territory reached Salt Lake City.

=== Territory of Utah ===
On September 9, 1850, as part of the Compromise of 1850, Utah Territory was organized, encompassing roughly the northern half of Deseret. The news did not reach Salt Lake City until January 1851. Governors of the Utah Territory were appointed by the president of the United States, and other than Brigham Young, they were frequently considered carpetbagger patronage appointees.

Governors of the Territory of Utah
No.	Governor		Term in office (Note: The range given is from the date the governor was confirmed by the Senate, or appointed by the President during a Senate recess, to the date the governor's successor was confirmed, unless noted.)	Appointed by
1	Portrait of a well-dressed nineteenth-century man, sitting.	Brigham Young (1801–1877)	September 28, 1850 (Note: Young was nominated on September 26, 1850; confirmed by the Senate on September 28; and took the oath of office in Utah on February 3, 1851. Edward Steptoe was nominated to replace Young on December 13, 1854, and confirmed by the Senate on December 21, but declined.) – July 11, 1857 (2479 days; replaced)	Millard Fillmore
2	Upper-body portrait of a mid-nineteenth-century man in a suit.	Alfred Cumming (1802–1873)	July 11, 1857 (Note: Cumming was appointed on July 11, 1857, during a Senate recess; nominated on December 22, 1857; and confirmed by the Senate on January 18, 1858. He arrived in Salt Lake City on April 12, 1858, having been delayed by the Utah War.) – May 17, 1861 (1407 days; left territory) (Note: Cumming and his wife left Salt Lake City on May 17, 1861, for a leave of absence but with no plans to return and no formal resignation; Territorial Secretaries Francis H. Wooton and Frank Fuller acted as governor until his successor arrived.)	James Buchanan
3	Upper-body portrait of a mid-nineteenth-century man in a suit.	John W. Dawson (1820–1877)	October 3, 1861 (Note: Dawson was appointed on October 3, 1861, during a Senate recess; nominated on December 23, 1861; but rejected by the Senate on March 19, 1862. He arrived in Salt Lake City on December 7, 1861.) – December 31, 1861 (90 days; left territory) (Note: Dawson left Salt Lake City on December 31, 1861, after threats of violence and being accused of "insulting (and perhaps molesting) his Mormon housekeeper"; Territorial Secretary Frank Fuller acted as governor until his successor arrived.)	Abraham Lincoln
4	Upper-body portrait of a mid-nineteenth-century man in a suit.	Stephen S. Harding (1808–1891)	March 31, 1862 (Note: Harding was nominated on March 24, 1862; confirmed by the Senate on March 31; and arrived in Salt Lake City on July 7.) – June 2, 1863 (429 days; replaced)	Abraham Lincoln
5	Upper-body portrait of a mid-nineteenth-century man in a suit.	James Duane Doty (1799–1865)	June 2, 1863 (Note: Doty was appointed on June 2, 1863, during a Senate recess; nominated on January 7, 1864; and confirmed by the Senate on February 2.) – June 13, 1865 (743 days; died in office) (Note: Territorial Secretary Amos Reed acted as governor until Doty's successor arrived.)	Abraham Lincoln
6	Upper-body portrait of a mid-nineteenth-century man in a suit.	Charles Durkee (1805–1870)	July 15, 1865 (Note: Durkee was appointed on July 15, 1865, during a Senate recess; nominated on December 19; and confirmed by the Senate on December 21. He arrived in Salt Lake City on September 30, 1865.) – January 17, 1870 (1648 days; replaced) (Note: Durkee left the territory in late December as his term was expiring; Territorial Secretary Stephen A. Mann acted as governor until his successor arrived.)	Andrew Johnson
7	Upper-body portrait of a mid-nineteenth-century man in a suit.	John Shaffer (1827–1870)	January 17, 1870 (Note: Shaffer was nominated on December 17, 1869; confirmed by the Senate on January 17, 1870; and arrived in the territory two months later.) – October 31, 1870 (288 days; died in office)	Ulysses S. Grant
8	Upper-body portrait of a mid-nineteenth-century man in a suit.	Vernon H. Vaughan (1838–1878)	October 31, 1870 (Note: Vaughan was appointed on October 31, 1870, during a Senate recess; he was already territorial secretary, so this just formalized his status as governor.) – February 2, 1871 (95 days; replaced)	Ulysses S. Grant
9	Upper-body portrait of a mid-nineteenth-century man in a suit.	George Lemuel Woods (1832–1890)	February 2, 1871 (Note: Silas A. Strickland was nominated on January 12, 1871, but the nomination was withdrawn, and Woods was nominated, on January 23, 1871. Woods was confirmed by the Senate on February 2, 1871, and arrived in Salt Lake City in late March.) – February 2, 1875 (1462 days; replaced) (Note: Woods left the territory on October 13, 1874; Territorial Secretary George A. Black acted as governor until his successor arrived.)	Ulysses S. Grant
10	Upper-body portrait of a late-nineteenth-century man in a suit.	Samuel Beach Axtell (1819–1891)	February 2, 1875 (Note: Axtell was nominated on December 15, 1874, for a term beginning February 2, 1875, and he was confirmed by the Senate on December 21.) – July 1, 1875 (150 days; replaced)	Ulysses S. Grant
11	Upper-body portrait of a late-nineteenth-century man in a suit.	George W. Emery (1830–1909)	July 1, 1875 (Note: Emery was appointed on July 1, 1875, during a Senate recess; nominated on December 9; and confirmed by the Senate on December 13.) – January 27, 1880 (1672 days; replaced)	Ulysses S. Grant
12	Upper-body portrait of a late-nineteenth-century man in a suit.	Eli Houston Murray (1843–1896)	January 27, 1880 (Note: Murray was nominated on January 19, 1880; confirmed by the Senate on January 27; and arrived in Salt Lake City a month later. He was reconfirmed by the Senate on June 28, 1884.) – March 16, 1886 (2241 days; resigned) (Note: Murray's resignation was requested from President Cleveland, and was delivered on March 16, though it's unclear when it was actually submitted.)	Rutherford B. Hayes
12	Upper-body portrait of a late-nineteenth-century man in a suit.	Eli Houston Murray (1843–1896)	January 27, 1880 – March 16, 1886 (2241 days; resigned)	Chester A. Arthur
13	Upper-body portrait of a late-nineteenth-century man in a suit.	Caleb Walton West (1844–1909)	April 21, 1886 (Note: West was nominated on April 5, 1886; confirmed by the Senate on April 21; and arrived in Salt Lake City on May 5.) – May 6, 1889 (1112 days; replaced)	Grover Cleveland
14	Upper-body portrait of a late-nineteenth-century man in a suit.	Arthur Lloyd Thomas (1851–1924)	May 6, 1889 (Note: Thomas was appointed on May 6, 1889, during a Senate recess; nominated on December 9; and confirmed by the Senate on December 17.) – May 9, 1893 (1465 days; replaced)	Benjamin Harrison
15	Upper-body portrait of a late-nineteenth-century man in a suit.	Caleb Walton West (1844–1909)	May 9, 1893 (Note: West was nominated on April 7, 1893, and confirmed by the Senate on April 11.) – January 4, 1896 (971 days; statehood)	Grover Cleveland

=== State of Utah ===
The State of Utah was admitted to the Union on January 4, 1896.

The governor has a four-year term, commencing on the first Monday of the January after an election. The Constitution of Utah originally stated that, should the office of governor be vacant, the power be devolved upon the Secretary of State, but the office of Lieutenant Governor was created in 1976, and a 1980 constitutional amendment added it to the constitution. If the office of governor becomes vacant during the first year of the term, the lieutenant governor becomes governor until the next general election; if it becomes vacant after the first year of the term, the lieutenant governor becomes governor for the remainder of the term. The offices of governor and lieutenant governor are elected on the same ticket. The governor was formerly limited to serving three terms, but all term limit laws were repealed by the Utah Legislature in 2003; Utah is one of the few states where gubernatorial term limits are not determined by the constitution.

Governors of the State of Utah
No.	Governor	Term in office	Party	Election	Lt. Governor (Note: The office of lieutenant governor was created in 1975.) (Note: Lieutenant governors represented the same party as their governor unless noted.)
1	Heber Manning Wells (1859–1938)	January 6, 1896 – January 2, 1905 (3284 days; lost nomination)	Republican	1895	Office did not exist
1	Heber Manning Wells (1859–1938)	January 6, 1896 – January 2, 1905 (3284 days; lost nomination)	Republican	1900	Office did not exist
2	John Christopher Cutler (1846–1928)	January 2, 1905 – January 4, 1909 (1464 days; retired)	Republican	1904	Office did not exist
3	William Spry (1864–1929)	January 4, 1909 – January 1, 1917 (2920 days; lost nomination) (Note: Spry lost the Republican nomination to Nephi L. Morris.)	Republican	1908	Office did not exist
3	William Spry (1864–1929)	January 4, 1909 – January 1, 1917 (2920 days; lost nomination)	Republican	1912	Office did not exist
4	Simon Bamberger (1845–1926)	January 1, 1917 – January 3, 1921 (1464 days; retired)	Democratic	1916	Office did not exist
5	Charles R. Mabey (1877–1959)	January 3, 1921 – January 5, 1925 (1464 days; lost election)	Republican	1920	Office did not exist
6	George Dern (1872–1936)	January 5, 1925 – January 2, 1933 (2920 days; retired)	Democratic	1924	Office did not exist
6	George Dern (1872–1936)	January 5, 1925 – January 2, 1933 (2920 days; retired)	Democratic	1928	Office did not exist
7	Henry H. Blood (1872–1942)	January 2, 1933 – January 6, 1941 (2927 days; retired)	Democratic	1932	Office did not exist
7	Henry H. Blood (1872–1942)	January 2, 1933 – January 6, 1941 (2927 days; retired)	Democratic	1936	Office did not exist
8	Herbert B. Maw (1893–1990)	January 6, 1941 – January 3, 1949 (2920 days; lost election)	Democratic	1940	Office did not exist
8	Herbert B. Maw (1893–1990)	January 6, 1941 – January 3, 1949 (2920 days; lost election)	Democratic	1944	Office did not exist
9	J. Bracken Lee (1899–1996)	January 3, 1949 – January 7, 1957 (2927 days; lost election) (Note: Lee lost the Republican nomination to George Dewey Clyde and ran as an independent.)	Republican	1948	Office did not exist
9	J. Bracken Lee (1899–1996)	January 3, 1949 – January 7, 1957 (2927 days; lost election)	Republican	1952	Office did not exist
10	George Dewey Clyde (1898–1972)	January 7, 1957 – January 4, 1965 (2920 days; retired)	Republican	1956	Office did not exist
10	George Dewey Clyde (1898–1972)	January 7, 1957 – January 4, 1965 (2920 days; retired)	Republican	1960	Office did not exist
11	Cal Rampton (1913–2007)	January 4, 1965 – January 3, 1977 (4383 days; retired)	Democratic	1964	Office did not exist
11	Cal Rampton (1913–2007)	January 4, 1965 – January 3, 1977 (4383 days; retired)	Democratic	1968	Office did not exist
11	Cal Rampton (1913–2007)	January 4, 1965 – January 3, 1977 (4383 days; retired)	Democratic	1972	Clyde L. Miller
12	Scott M. Matheson (1929–1990)	January 3, 1977 – January 7, 1985 (2927 days; retired)	Democratic	1976	David Smith Monson (Note: Represented the Republican Party)
12	Scott M. Matheson (1929–1990)	January 3, 1977 – January 7, 1985 (2927 days; retired)	Democratic	1980	David Smith Monson
13	Norman H. Bangerter (1933–2015)	January 7, 1985 – January 4, 1993 (2920 days; retired)	Republican	1984	W. Val Oveson
13	Norman H. Bangerter (1933–2015)	January 7, 1985 – January 4, 1993 (2920 days; retired)	Republican	1988	W. Val Oveson
14	Mike Leavitt (b. 1951)	January 4, 1993 – November 5, 2003 (3958 days; resigned) (Note: Leavitt resigned, having been confirmed as Administrator of the Environmental Protection Agency.)	Republican	1992	Olene Walker
14	Mike Leavitt (b. 1951)	January 4, 1993 – November 5, 2003 (3958 days; resigned)	Republican	1996	Olene Walker
14	Mike Leavitt (b. 1951)	January 4, 1993 – November 5, 2003 (3958 days; resigned)	Republican	2000	Olene Walker
15	Olene Walker (1930–2015)	November 5, 2003 – January 3, 2005 (426 days; lost nomination)	Republican	Succeeded from lieutenant governor	Gayle McKeachnie
16	Jon Huntsman Jr. (b. 1960)	January 3, 2005 – August 11, 2009 (1682 days; resigned) (Note: Huntsman resigned, having been confirmed as United States Ambassador to China.)	Republican	2004	Gary Herbert
16	Jon Huntsman Jr. (b. 1960)	January 3, 2005 – August 11, 2009 (1682 days; resigned)	Republican	2008	Gary Herbert
17	Gary Herbert (b. 1947)	August 11, 2009 – January 4, 2021 (4165 days; retired)	Republican	Succeeded from lieutenant governor	Vacant
17	Gary Herbert (b. 1947)	August 11, 2009 – January 4, 2021 (4165 days; retired)	Republican	Succeeded from lieutenant governor	Greg Bell (appointed September 1, 2009) (resigned October 16, 2013)
17	Gary Herbert (b. 1947)	August 11, 2009 – January 4, 2021 (4165 days; retired)	Republican	2010 (special)	Greg Bell (appointed September 1, 2009) (resigned October 16, 2013)
17	Gary Herbert (b. 1947)	August 11, 2009 – January 4, 2021 (4165 days; retired)	Republican	2012	Greg Bell (appointed September 1, 2009) (resigned October 16, 2013)
17	Gary Herbert (b. 1947)	August 11, 2009 – January 4, 2021 (4165 days; retired)	Republican	2012	Spencer Cox (appointed October 16, 2013)
17	Gary Herbert (b. 1947)	August 11, 2009 – January 4, 2021 (4165 days; retired)	Republican	2016	Spencer Cox (appointed October 16, 2013)
18	Spencer Cox (b. 1975)	January 4, 2021 – Incumbent (Note: Cox's second term began on January 8, 2025, and will expire on January 1, 2029.) (in office 2149 days)	Republican	2020	Deidre Henderson
18	Spencer Cox (b. 1975)	January 4, 2021 – Incumbent (in office 2149 days)	Republican	2024	Deidre Henderson

== Timeline ==
Timeline of Utah governors

== See also ==
- Gubernatorial lines of succession in the United States § Utah
- First ladies and gentlemen of Utah
- Lieutenant Governor of Utah
- List of Utah state legislatures

== Sources ==
- "Former Utah Governors". National Governors Association.
- "Utah Constitution". State Democracy Research Initiative. University of Wisconsin Law School.
- Glashan, Roy R. (1979). American Governors and Gubernatorial Elections, 1775-1978. Meckler Books. ISBN 0-7201-1511-6 – via Internet Archive.
- Kallenbach, Joseph E.; Kallenbach, Jessamine S. (1977). American State Governors, 1776-1976. Oceana Publications. ISBN 978-0-379-00665-0 – via Internet Archive.
- McMullin, Thomas A.; Walker, David (1984). Biographical Directory of American Territorial Governors. Meckler Publishing. ISBN 0-930466-11-X – via Internet Archive.
- Mullaney, Marie Marmo (1994). Biographical Directory of the Governors of the United States, 1988–1994. Greenwood Publishing Group. ISBN 0-313-28312-5 – via Internet Archive.
- Sobel, Robert; Raimo, John (1978). Biographical Directory of the Governors of the United States, 1789-1978. Vol. 4. Meckler Books. ISBN 0-930466-01-2 – via Internet Archive.
- Thorpe, Francis Newton, ed. (1909). The Federal and State Constitutions, Colonial Charters, and Other Organic Laws of the States, Territories, and Colonies Now or Heretofore Forming the United States of America. Vol. 6. United States Government Publishing Office – via Internet Archive.
