= 2026 Salt Lake County Council election =

Local election in Utah, US

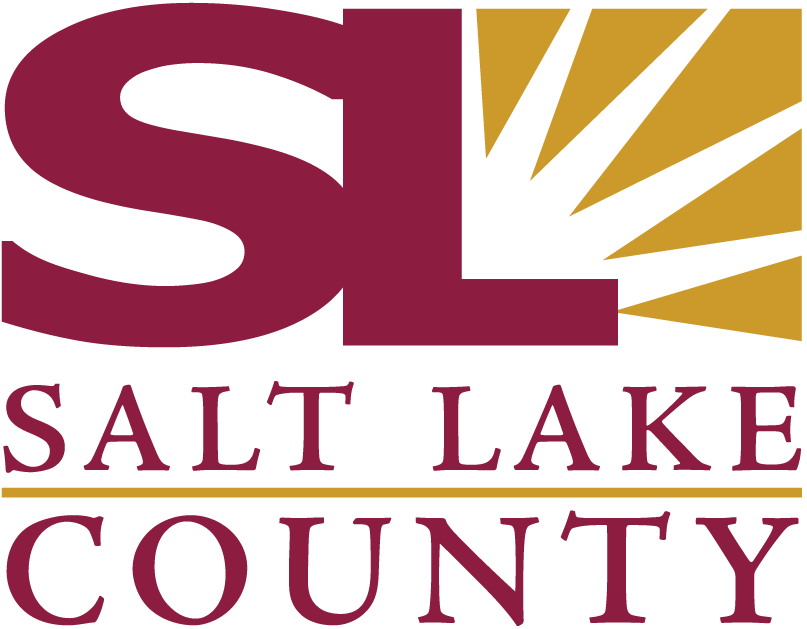
- November 3, 2026
	First party	Second party
Party	Democratic	Democratic
Seats before	4	5
Seats after	6	3
Seat change	▲2	▼2

The 2026 Salt Lake County Council election was held on November 3, 2026, to elect four of nine members to the Salt Lake County Council, the legislative body of Salt Lake County, Utah. Primary elections were held on June 23.

== At-Large A ==
=== Republican primary ===
==== Candidates ====
===== Nominee =====
- Kathleen Anderson, candidate for U.S. representative in 2020 and 2023

===== Eliminated at convention =====
- Laurie Stringham, incumbent councilmember

=== Democratic primary ===
==== Candidates ====
===== Nominee =====
- Zach Robinson, healthcare worker

===== Eliminated at convention =====
- Garry Hrechkosy
- Nate Salazar
- Tenille Taggart

=== Third-party candidates ===
- Gregory Beglarian (Constitution)
- Maleah Bliss Caulford (Forward)

=== General election ===
==== Results ====
2026 Salt Lake County Council election, at-large A
Party	Candidate	Votes	%
Democratic	Zach Robinson	234,128	62.91
Republican	Kathleen Anderson	128,495	34.53
Constitution	Gregory Beglarian	9,516	2.56
Total votes		372,139	100.00

== District 1 ==
=== Democratic primary ===
==== Candidates ====
===== Nominee =====
- Jiro Johnson, incumbent councilmember

=== Third-party candidates ===
- Casey Poe (Libertarian)

=== General election ===
==== Results ====
2026 Salt Lake County Council election, district 1
Party	Candidate	Votes	%
Democratic	Jiro Johnson (incumbent)	43,641	86.08
Libertarian	Casey Poe	7,055	13.92
Total votes		50,696	100.00

== District 3 ==
=== Republican primary ===
==== Candidates ====
===== Nominee =====
- Mike Bird

===== Declined =====
- Aimee Winder Newton, incumbent councilmember

=== Democratic primary ===
==== Candidates ====
===== Nominee =====
- Luke Maynes

===== Eliminated at convention =====
- Jared Eborn

=== General election ===
==== Results ====
2026 Salt Lake County Council election, district 3
Party	Candidate	Votes	%
Democratic	Luke Maynes	30,761	58.45
Republican	Mike Bird	21,871	41.55
Total votes		52,632	100.00

== District 5 ==
=== Republican primary ===
==== Candidates ====
===== Nominee =====
- Traci Crockett

===== Eliminated in primary =====
- Chris Null

===== Eliminated at convention =====
- Jared Esselman

===== Withdrawn =====
- Sheldon Stewart, incumbent councilmember

==== Results ====
Republican primary
Party	Candidate	Votes	%
Republican	Traci Crockett	8,451	50.91
Republican	Chris Null	8,149	49.09
Total votes		16,600	100.00

=== Democratic primary ===
==== Candidates ====
===== Nominee =====
- Sara Cimmers

=== General election ===
==== Results ====
2026 Salt Lake County Council election, district 5
Party	Candidate	Votes	%
Republican	Traci Crockett	33,286	55.34
Democratic	Sara Cimmers	26,859	44.66
Total votes		60,145	100.00
