= 2002 Salt Lake County Council election =

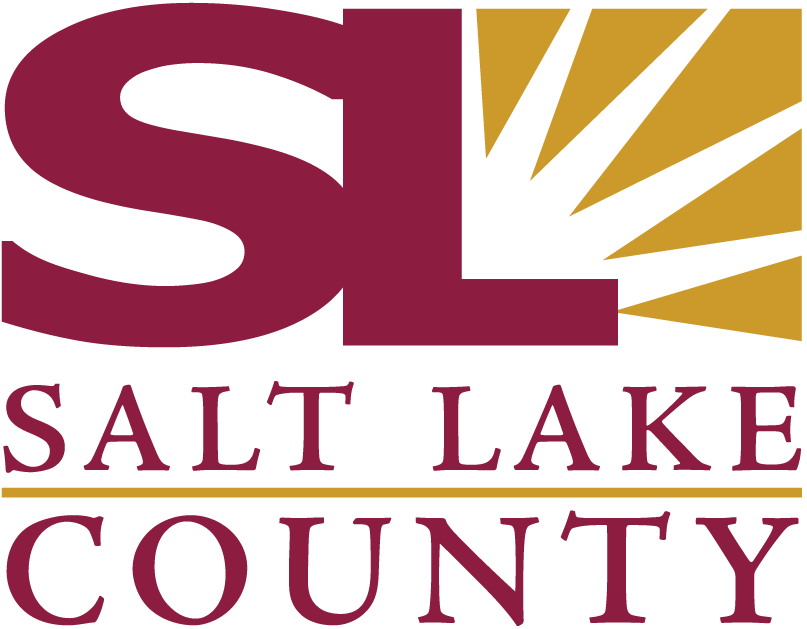
- November 7, 2002

4 out of 9 seats in the Salt Lake County Council (1 at-large and 3 districts) 5 seats needed for a majority
	Majority party	Minority party
Party	Republican	Democratic
Seats won	6; 1 at-large 5 districts	3; 2 at-large 1 district
Percentage	66.67%	33.33%

The 2002 Salt Lake County Council election was held on Tuesday, November 5, 2002, to elect 4 of the 9 members of the Salt Lake County Council (1 at-large and 3 districts).

No seats changed hands in the election.

== Election results ==
The Salt Lake County council consists of nine seats: three alphabetical districts are at-large and elected to six-year terms, while six numerical districts are sectioned into separate districts and elected to four year terms.

=== At-large seat A ===
Salt Lake County Council seat A
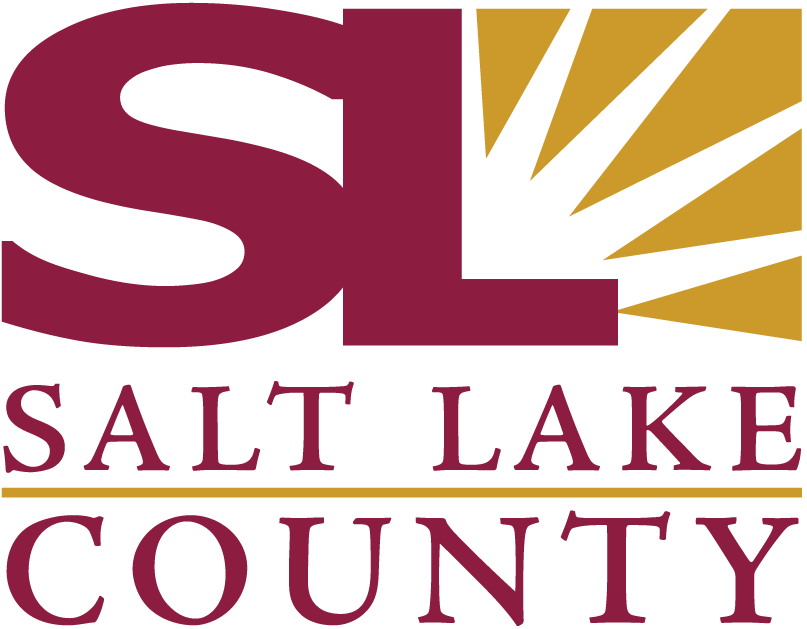
Nominee	Randy Horiuchi	J. Bruce Reading	Diana Lee Hirschi
Party	Democratic	Republican	Green Party of Utah
Popular vote	108,724	96,882	14,403
Percentage	49.42%	44.04%	6.55%
Councilman before election
Randy Horiuchi
Democratic
Elected Councilman
Randy Horiuchi
Democratic

2002 Salt Lake County Council at-large seat A
Party	Candidate	Votes	%	
Democratic	Randy Horiuchi (incumbent)	108,724	49.42	▲1.45%
Republican	J. Bruce Reading	96,882	44.04	▼1.85%
Green Party of Utah	Diana Lee Hirschi	14,403	6.55	▲6.55%
Majority		11,842	5.38	▲3.3%
Turnout		299,116	50.51	▼16.83%
Democratic hold				

=== District 1 ===
Salt Lake County Council 1st district
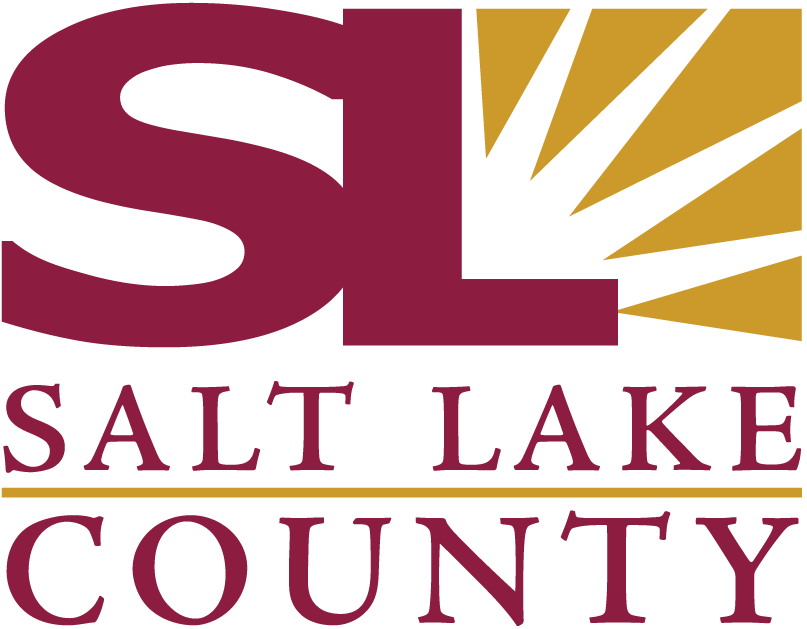
Nominee	Joe Hatch	Sean B. Thomas	Patrick C. Beecroft
Party	Democratic	Republican	Green Party of Utah
Popular vote	19,701	10,702	2,804
Percentage	59.33%	32.23%	8.44%
Councilman before election
Joe Hatch
Democratic
Elected Councilman
Joe Hatch
Democratic

2002 Salt Lake County Council district 1
Party	Candidate	Votes	%	
Democratic	Joe Hatch	19,701	59.33	▲0.29%
Republican	Sean B. Thomas	10,702	32.23	▼8.73%
Green Party of Utah	Patrick C. Beecroft	2,804	8.44	▲8.44%
Majority		8,999	27.1	▲9.02%
Turnout		33,207	47.67	▼12.41%
Democratic hold				

=== District 3 ===
Salt Lake County Council 3rd district
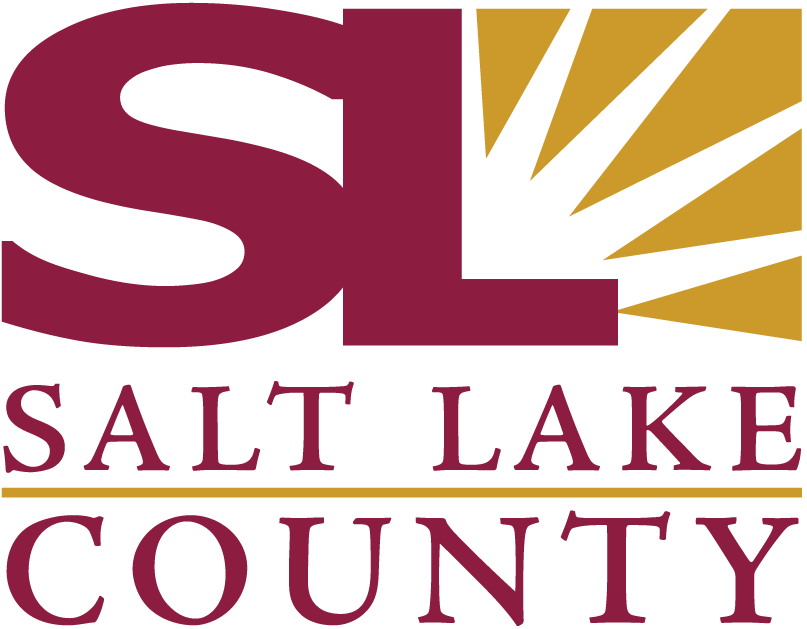
Nominee	David A. Wilde	Manuel Romero
Party	Republican	Democratic
Popular vote	16,949	12,076
Percentage	58.39%	41.61%
Councilman before election
David A. Wilde
Republican
Elected Councilman
David A. Wilde
Republican

2002 Salt Lake County Council district 3
Party	Candidate	Votes	%	
Republican	David A. Wilde	16,949	58.39	▲6.32%
Democratic	Manuel Romero	12,076	41.61	▼6.32%
Majority		4,873	16.78	▲12.64%
Turnout		29,025	45.14	▼18.17%
Republican hold				

=== District 5 ===
Salt Lake County Council 5th district
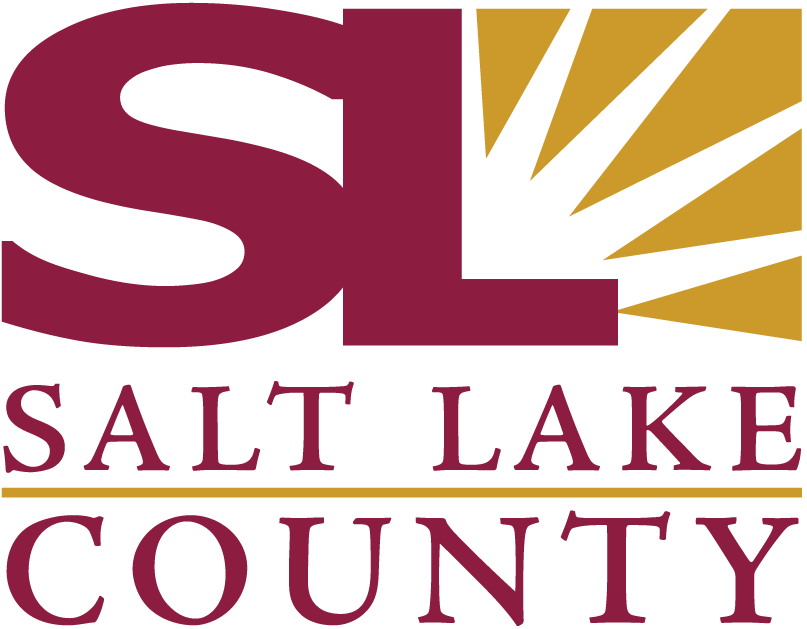
Nominee	Cortlund G. Ashton	Elizabeth Romero
Party	Republican	Democratic
Popular vote	19,226	10,652
Percentage	64.35%	35.65%
Councilman before election
Winston A. Wilkinson
Republican
Elected Councilman
Cortlund G. Ashton
Republican

2002 Salt Lake County Council district 5
Party	Candidate	Votes	%	
Republican	Cortlund G. Ashton	19,226	64.35	▲3.55%
Democratic	Elizabeth Romero	10,652	35.65	▲0.41%
Majority		8,574	28.7	▲3.14%
Turnout		29,878	45.55	▼22.08%
Republican hold				
