= 2004 Salt Lake County Council election =

County election

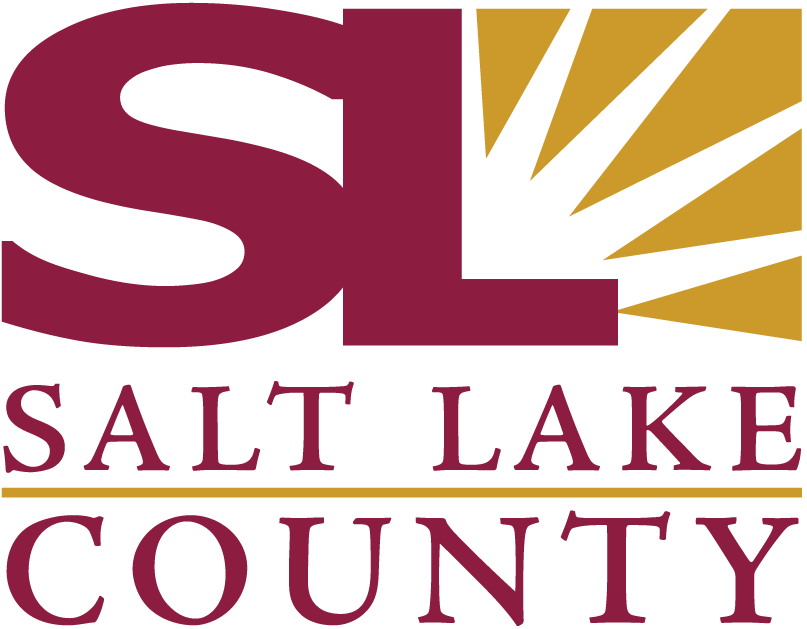
- November 2, 2004

4 out of 9 seats in the Salt Lake County Council (1 at-large and 3 districts) 5 seats needed for a majority
	Majority party	Minority party
Party	Republican	Democratic
Last election	6; 1 at-large 5 districts	3; 2 at-large 1 district
Seats won	5; 0 at-large 5 districts	4; 3 at-large 1 district
Seat change	▼1	▲1
Percentage	55.56%	44.44%

The 2002 Salt Lake County Council election was held on Tuesday, November 2, 2004, to elect 4 of the 9 members of the Salt Lake County Council (1 at-large and 3 districts).

Democrats captured one at-large seat, thus gaining one more seat and putting them in control of all three countywide at-large seats. Jenny Wilson became the first woman elected to the council since its foundation in 2000 (though at least one woman (Republican Mary Callaghan, elected 1998) had previously served on the county commission, that the council replaced in 2000.)

== Election results ==
The Salt Lake County council consists of nine seats: three alphabetical districts are at-large and elected to six-year terms, while six numerical districts are sectioned into separate districts and elected to four year terms.

=== At-large seat B ===
Salt Lake County Council at-large seat B
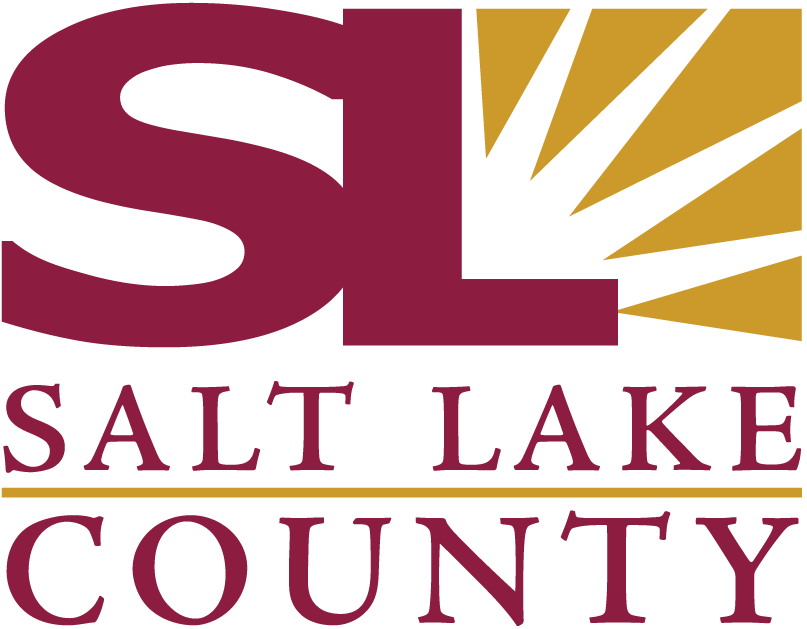
Nominee	Jenny Wilson	Steve Harmsen
Party	Democratic	Republican
Popular vote	177,042	163,062
Percentage	50.88%	46.86%
Council(wo)man before election
Steve Harmsen
Republican
Elected Council(wo)man
Jenny Wilson
Democratic

2004 Salt Lake County Council seat B
Party	Candidate	Votes	%	±%
Democratic	Jenny Wilson	177,042	50.88	▲8.31%
Republican	Steve Harmsen (incumbent)	163,062	46.86	▼5.83%
Personal Choice	Jimmy Cadman	7,881	2.26	▲2.26%
Majority		13,980	4.02	▼6.1%
Turnout		347,985	72.38	▲6.59%
Democratic gain from Republican		Swing	14.14%	

=== District 2 ===
Salt Lake County Council 2nd district
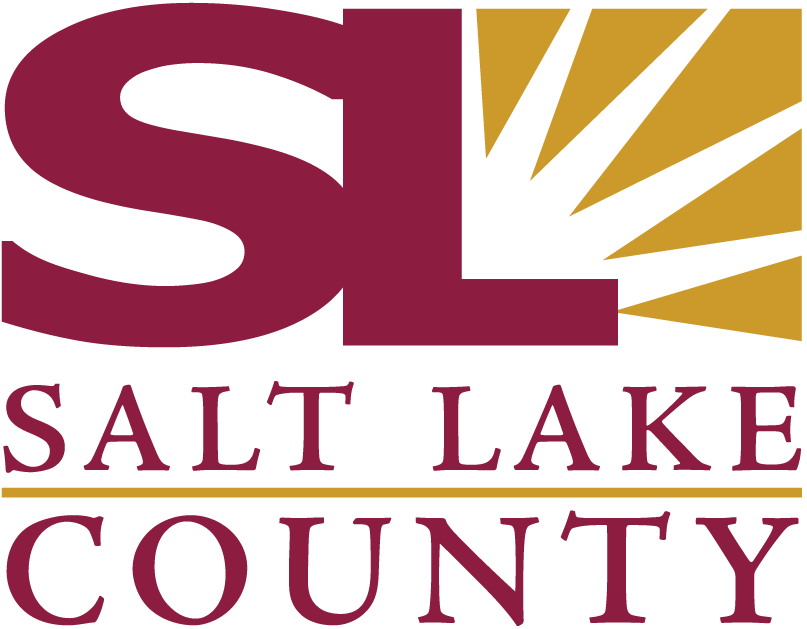
Nominee	Michael H. Jensen	K.C. Froehle
Party	Republican	Personal Choice
Popular vote	37,624	7,720
Percentage	72.85%	14.95%
Councilman before election
Michael H. Jensen
Republican
Elected Councilman
Michael H. Jensen
Republican

2004 Salt Lake County Council district 2
Party	Candidate	Votes	%	
Republican	Michael H. Jensen (incumbent)	37,624	72.85	▲15.44%
Personal Choice	K.C. Froehle	7,720	14.95	▲14.95%
Majority		29,904	57.9	▲38.28%
Turnout		47,537	61.23	▼8.3%
Republican hold				

=== District 4 ===
Salt Lake County Council 4th district
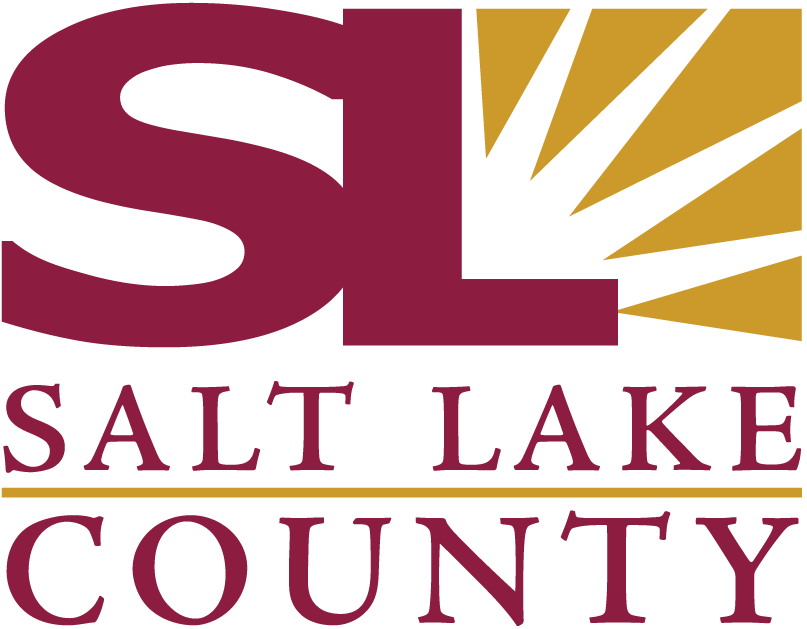
Nominee	Mark Crockett	Dina Blaes
Party	Republican	Democratic
Popular vote	38,052	35,135
Percentage	51.99%	48.01%
Councilman before election
Russell C. Skousen
Republican
Elected Councilman
Mark Crockett
Republican

2004 Salt Lake County Council district 4
Party	Candidate	Votes	%	
Republican	Mark Crockett	38,052	51.99	▲1.9%
Democratic	Dina Blaes	35,135	48.01	▼1.9%
Majority		2,917	3.98	▲3.8%
Turnout		52,832	75.26	▲6.85%
Republican hold				

=== District 6 ===
Salt Lake County Council 6th district
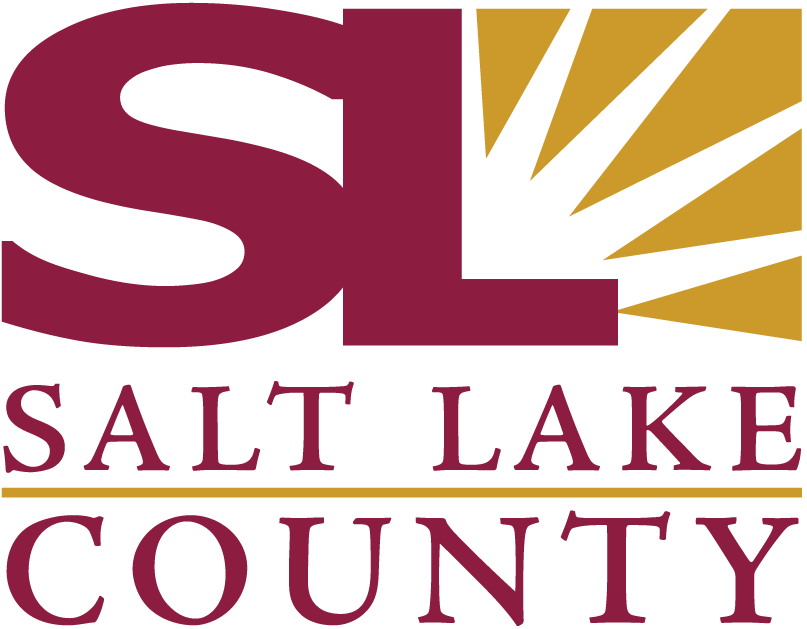
Nominee	Marvin L. Hendrickson	J. Chris Cage
Party	Republican	Democratic
Popular vote	34,425	27,744
Percentage	55.37%	44.63%
Councilman before election
Marvin L. Hendrickson
Republican
Elected Councilman
Marvin L. Hendrickson
Republican

2004 Salt Lake County Council district 6
Party	Candidate	Votes	%	
Republican	Marvin L. Hendrickson (incumbent)	34,425	55.37	▲1.21%
Democratic	J. Chris Cage	27,744	44.63	▼1.21%
Majority		6,681	10.74	▼2.42%
Turnout		62,169	73.42	▼5.79%
Republican hold				
