= YDU =

YDU may refer to:

- Kasba Lake Airport, the IATA code YDU
- Young Democrats of Utah, an American political organization
- Yu Da University of Science and Technology, a private university in Zaoqiao, Miaoli County, Taiwan
- Yakın Doğu Üniversitesi (YDÜ), a private university located in Northern Cyprus
- Yakın Doğu Üniversitesi (women's basketball), a university in Northern Cyprus
