= Earl J. Glade =

American mayor (1885–1966)

Earl J. Glade (December 2, 1885 – September 12, 1966) was the 25th mayor of Salt Lake City, Utah.

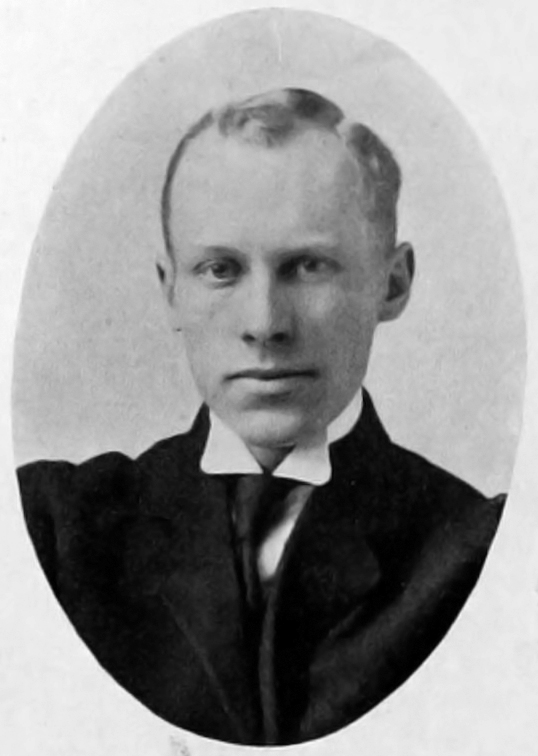
Earl J. Glade in 1911

Glade was born in Ogden, Utah Territory on December 2, 1885. A member of The Church of Jesus Christ of Latter-day Saints, he served as a missionary for the Church of Jesus Christ of Latter-day Saints (LDS Church) in Germany from 1904 to 1907; during some of this time he was the president of the Breslau Conference. Glade married Sarah Elizabeth Rasband and they had seven children.

Glade studied at Brigham Young University (BYU) where Christen Jensen was one of his professors. He also studied at Rochester Business Institute and later pursued graduate studies at the University of Chicago. He was the head of the business program at BYU for five years. He later was a professor of business at the University of Utah. From 1925 to 1939 Glade was the head of KSL. Glade was one of the principal people behind the starting of the program Music and the Spoken Word, for which he produced the first broadcast. He was a member of the Peabody Awards Board of Jurors from 1942 to 1966.

Glade was first elected mayor of Salt Lake City in 1944. While mayor, Glade was closely connected with the Little Dell Dam project to lessen flooding in the city.

Glade also served on the General Board of the Deseret Sunday School Union. Glade unsuccessfully ran for governor of Utah in 1952, losing to J. Bracken Lee.

One of the rooms in the Jesse Knight Building on BYU campus was named for Glade. BYU also has a broadcast journalism award named for Glade. Among those who have earned the Glade award are Jane Clayson and Sharlene Hawkes.

Glade's daughter Patricia married LeGrand R. Curtis, a general authority of the LDS Church; she was the mother of LeGrand R. Curtis Jr., who was also a general authority. They also had a son Earl J. Glade, Jr., who was involved in broadcasting as was his father; he served as head of BYU's radio and television broadcasting operations.

Party political offices
Preceded by Herbert B. Maw	Democratic nominee for Governor of Utah; 1952	Succeeded by L. C. "Rennie" Romney
Political offices
Preceded by Ab Jenkins	Mayor of Salt Lake City; 1944–1956	Succeeded by Adiel F. Stewart
