= Adiel F. Stewart =

American politician

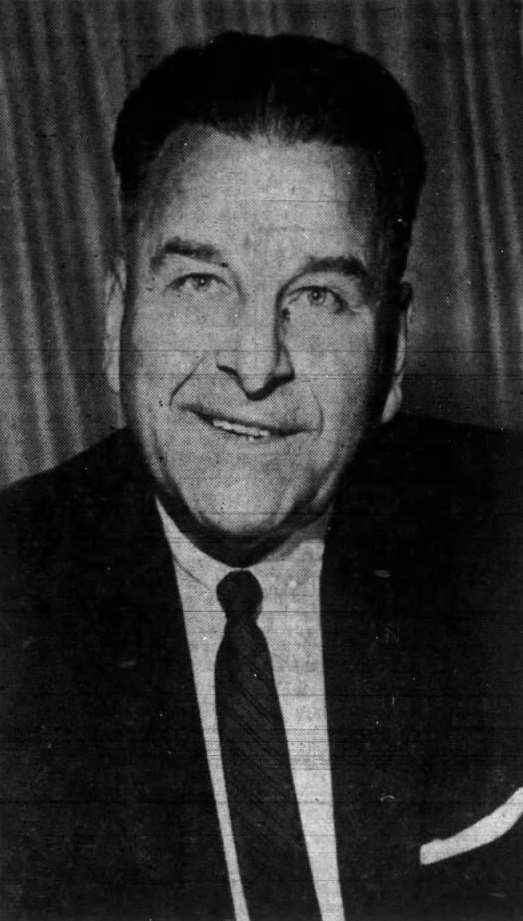
- Deseret News, March 5, 1960

26th Mayor of Salt Lake City
- In office 1956–1959
- Preceded by: Earl J. Glade
- Succeeded by: J. Bracken Lee

Chairman of the Salt Lake County Commission
- In office 1953–1955
- Preceded by: Ray Greenwood
- Succeeded by: Lamont B. Gunderson

Member of the Salt Lake County Commission
- In office 1953–1955
- Preceded by: Lawrence A. Jones
- Succeeded by: Abram Barker

Personal details
- Born: January 18, 1897 Salt Lake City, Utah
- Died: March 6, 1960 (aged 63) Salt Lake City, Utah
- Resting place: Wasatch Lawn Memorial Park, Millcreek, Utah
- Political party: Republican
- Spouse: Mary DeEtte Buys (m. 1923)
- Children: 3
- Education: University of Utah (attended)
- Occupation: Businessman

Adiel F. Stewart (January 18, 1897 – March 6, 1960) was an American politician. A Republican, he served as the mayor of Salt Lake City from 1956 to 1959.

== Biography ==
Adiel Fitzgerald Stewart was born in Salt Lake City, Utah on January 18, 1897, the son of Joshua Beyon Stewart and Mary Jane (Fitzgerald) Stewart. He attended the schools of the Granite School District and the University of Utah, then began a business career as a partner with his brothers J. B. and Harold in the Stewart Brothers coal company.

Stewart was a leader in the Church of Jesus Christ of Latter-day Saints and served as president of the Temple View Stake and bishop of the McKinley Ward. He was also a well-known singer, and performed at thousands of church and public functions throughout his life.

Stewart's business ventures and holdings expanded over time, and included serving as an executive, manager, or board of directors member of Stewart Brothers Sand and Gravel, Cinder Block, Inc., Acme Lime Products, Grand Deposit Mining, Plateau Gas and Oil, Acme Lime Weight Aggregates, and Deseret News Publishing.

A Republican in politics, Stewart served as chairman of the Salt Lake County Commission from 1953 to 1955. He served as mayor of Salt Lake City from 1956 to 1959.

Stewart died of a heart attack in Salt Lake City on March 6, 1960. He was buried at Wasatch Lawn Memorial Park in Millcreek, Utah.

== Family ==
In 1923, Stewart married Mary DeEtte Buys. They were the parents of three children: Adiel Gerald (Jerry), William Lawrence (Larry), and Mary DeEtte.
