= Herbert B. Maw =

American politician

Herbert Maw
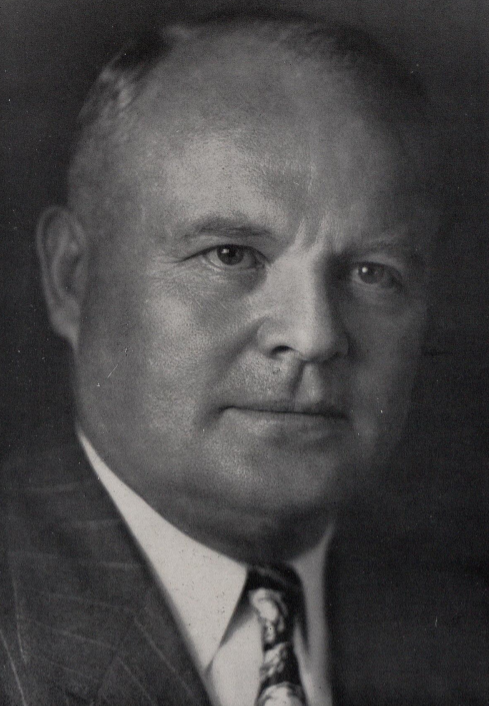

Chair of the National Governors Association
- In office May 28, 1944 – July 1, 1945
- Preceded by: Leverett Saltonstall
- Succeeded by: Ed Martin

8th Governor of Utah
- In office January 6, 1941 – January 3, 1949
- Preceded by: Henry H. Blood
- Succeeded by: J. Bracken Lee

Personal details
- Born: Herbert Brown Maw; March 11, 1893 Ogden, Utah, U.S.
- Died: November 17, 1990 (aged 97) Salt Lake City, Utah, U.S.
- Resting place: Salt Lake City Cemetery
- Party: Democratic
- Spouse: Florence Buehler
- Children: 5
- Education: University of Utah (BS, LLB); Northwestern University (MA, JD)

Herbert Brown Maw (March 11, 1893 – November 17, 1990) was an American politician and educator who was the eighth governor of Utah. He served as governor from 1941 to 1949. He was a Democrat and was a member of the Church of Jesus Christ of Latter-day Saints (LDS Church).

== Early life ==
Maw was born in Ogden in the Utah Territory. When he was seven his family moved to Salt Lake City. He studied at LDS High School as a youth.

== Education ==
Maw received his bachelor of laws and Bachelor of Science degrees from the University of Utah, an MA from Northwestern University in 1926 and a Juris Doctor degree also from Northwestern in 1927. While in school at the University of Utah, he joined the Sigma Chi fraternity and became a member of the inaugural pledge class initiated to the Beta Epsilon chapter.

== Military ==
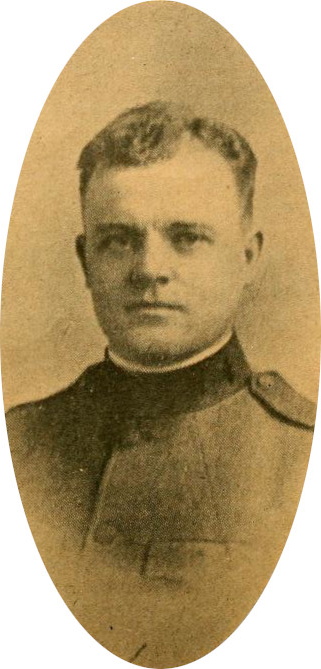
Maw as a chaplain

Maw was trained as a pilot by the Aviation Corps during World War I at Kelley Air Base in Texas. Before he was deployed in this service he was made an LDS Chaplain with the rank of First Lieutenant and assigned to work with the 89th Division at Camp Funston, Kansas. He was then sent to Europe and after the end of the war served in the Army of Occupation in Germany. Maw was one of only three LDS chaplains in the US military during World War I.

== Early career ==
Maw taught at LDS Business College from 1916 to 1917 and from 1919 to 1923. He was a professor of speech at the University of Utah from 1927 until 1940. Maw served as Dean of Men at the University of Utah from 1928 until 1936. Maw was influential on the development of the University of Utah and its future course.

== Political career ==
Maw was elected to the Utah State Senate in 1928 where he served until 1938. Maw served as the President of the Utah State Senate from 1934 until 1938. He was an unsuccessful candidate for the Democratic nomination for the US Senate in 1934 and Governor in 1936. His loss was partly a result of his strong support of measures to help workers. Maw's winning the Democratic nomination in 1940 was largely the result of his successful push for direct primaries.

Maw was first elected governor of Utah in 1940, defeating Republican Don B. Colton. While serving as governor Maw pushed through reductions in the utility rates and regulations on ore extraction in the state. He also attempted (successfully) to attract military facilities and related industries to Utah during World War II; the resulting increase in employment revived the state's economy and helped retire public debt.

In 1944 Maw was narrowly re-elected over Republican J. Bracken Lee in the closest gubernatorial election in Utah history. In 1948 Maw lost to Lee in a re-match. In this election Maw was a clear and consistent opponent of liberalizing Utah's drinking laws.

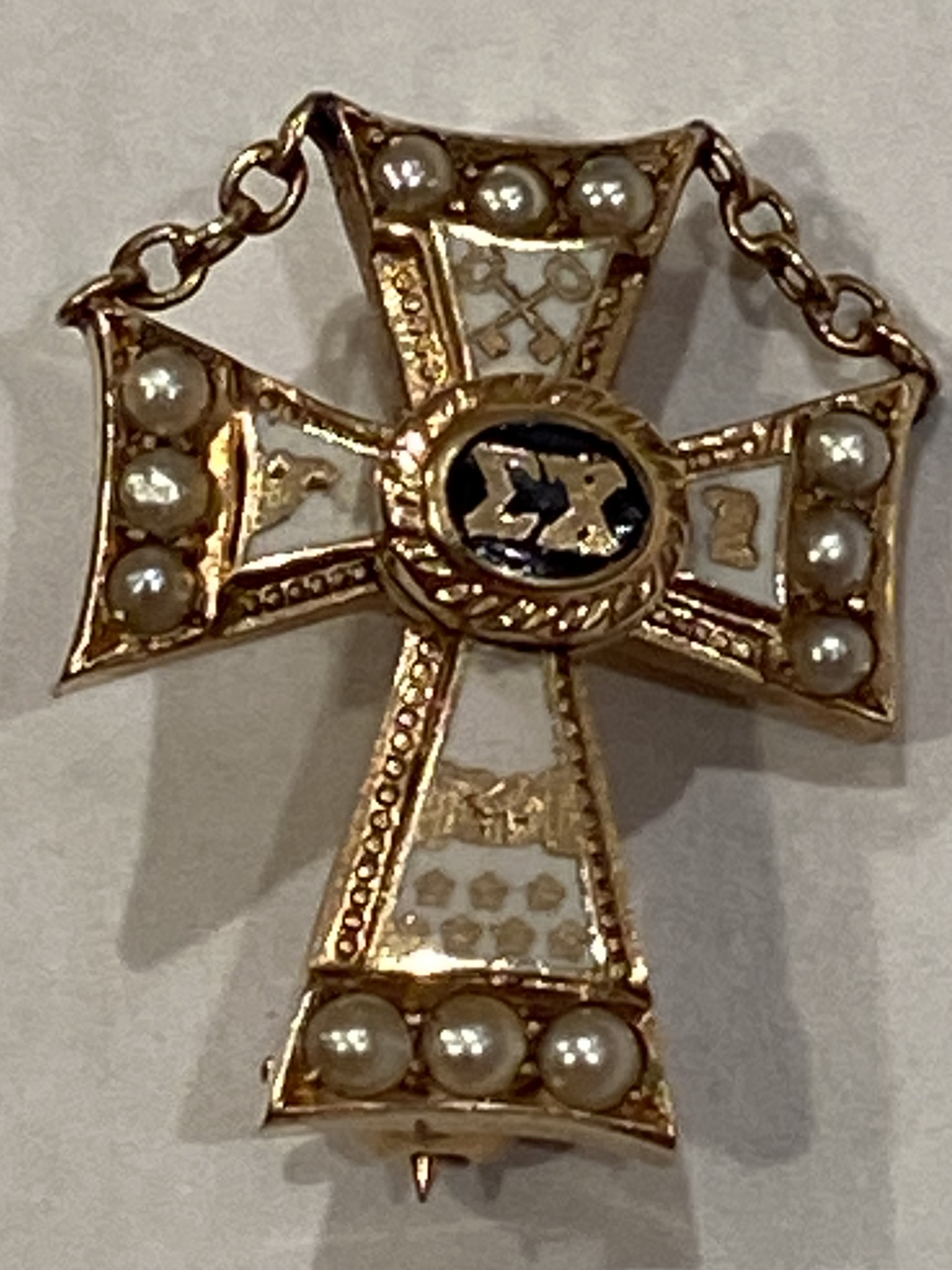
Front view of Herbert Maw's Sigma Chi White Cross, circa 1975. Likely from around the time of his pledge class' 50th anniversary.

== Religious life ==
Maw held many positions in the LDS Church. He was a Sunday School teacher in both Salt Lake City and Chicago. He also taught in the Young Men's Mutual Improvement Association (YMMIA) and was a ward and stake leader of that organization. In 1928 and 1929, he was the Superintendent of the Liberty Stake Sunday School, during which years he was also a member of the stake high council. From 1928 to 1935, Maw was a member of the general board of the YMMIA. In December 1935, Maw became a member of the Deseret Sunday School Union General Board.

== Family ==
Maw married Florence Buehler on June 22, 1922. They had five children.

Party political offices
Preceded by Henry H. Blood	Democratic nominee for Governor of Utah; 1940, 1944, 1948	Succeeded by Earl J. Glade
Political offices
Preceded by Henry H. Blood	Governor of Utah; 1941–1949	Succeeded by J. Bracken Lee
Preceded by Leverett Saltonstall	Chair of the National Governors Association; 1944–1945	Succeeded by Ed Martin
