= Young Democrats of Utah =

American political organization

- President: Emma Fetzer
- Founded: 2003
- Headquarters: Salt Lake City, Utah
- Mother party: Utah Democratic Party
- National affiliation: Young Democrats of America
- Website: www.youngdemsofutah.com

The Young Democrats of Utah (YDU) is an official caucus of the Utah Democratic Party. The group's membership is open to all Utah Democrats under the age of 36.

== Leadership ==
YDU membership elects its officers at its annual convention. Its executive committee consists of the President, the Vice President, the Secretary, the Treasurer, the Communications Director, two National Committee Representatives, and the chair from each of its two sub-caucuses. Those two caucuses are the Young Professional Democrats of Utah and the High School Democrats of Utah.

- President: Tyrell Aagard
- Vice-president: Christopher Foote
- Secretary: Emma Fetzer
- Treasurer:
- National Committee Representative: Jack Davis
- National Committee Representative: Angela Charles
- Communications Director: Marta Hubbard
- Young Professionals Caucus Chair: vacant
- High School Caucus Chair: Sandrine Mimche

== See also ==
- Young Democrats of America
- College Democrats
- High School Democrats of America
