= Henry H. Blood =

Governor of Utah

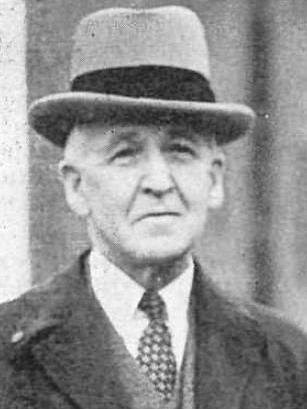

7th Governor of Utah
- In office January 2, 1933 – January 6, 1941
- Preceded by: George Dern
- Succeeded by: Herbert B. Maw

Personal details
- Born: Henry Hooper Blood; October 1, 1872 Kaysville, Utah Territory
- Died: June 19, 1942 (aged 69) Salt Lake City, Utah, U.S.
- Cause of death: Cerebral hemorrhage
- Party: Democratic
- Spouse: Minnie Barnes
- Profession: Politician

Henry Hooper Blood (October 1, 1872 – June 19, 1942) was an American businessman and the seventh governor of Utah.

== Biography ==
Henry was born to William Hooper Blood, a farmer and city councilman, and Jane Wilkie Hooper. His parents were both English immigrants. He went to local schools and attended Brigham Young Academy at Provo, which later turned into a university. In 1896 he married his childhood sweetheart, Minnie Barnes, and together they had four children, two boys, and two girls. Blood was elected Recorder of Kaysville in 1893 and became the Davis County Treasurer from 1896 to 1900. After that, in 1901, he was made Minute Clerk of Utah State Senate, and became a missionary for the Church of Jesus Christ of Latter-day Saints from 1901 to 1904 in England. When he returned to the United States from England, Blood became a member of the Davis County School Board, Utah Public Utilities Commission, and the Utah State Road Commission, of which he was elected chairman in 1925. He became involved in the Kaysville Milling Company as a manager. Also, he engaged in the buying and selling of grains and flour. A few years later, Kaysville Milling Company joined Layton Milling Company and Elevator Company. Soon after the two combined, Blood became president of the company.

== Political career ==
In 1932, Blood ran for governor after being nominated by the Democrats. He defeated his Republican opponent, William W. Seegmiller, and took his place as the seventh governor of the State of Utah Blood was known for putting his state on a "pay as you go" basis. He has been compared to Calvin Coolidge because of his commitment to the economy, but the difference between them was that Blood was a dedicated Democrat and a faithful follower of the New Deal. He served two terms starting in 1933 and ending in 1941. He won his second term in 1936 against Herbert B. Maw, a liberal Democrat, Ray E. Dillman, a Republican, and Ogden Mayor Harman, an independent progressive. His time in office was during an extremely hard time for the United States because of the depression. In 1937 Blood approved many bills to be passed but warned about the future cost of retirement funds, vocational and adult education programs, and a junior college in Price which is now the College of Eastern Utah. The depression hit Utah pretty hard leaving it struggling as one of the top states for citizen's relief. The situation got even worse in 1934 when Utah had its worst recorded drought in history. Utahns were left without food, clothing, shelter, and employment. Hundreds of letters from Utahns were sent to Governor Blood's office every day.

== Road to recovery ==
By instituting new programs, decreasing state employees' wages, and slashing state departments' size, Blood began his long journey to economic recovery. In addition, he supported and followed President Roosevelt's New Deal. Programs such as Public Works Administration, Home Owners Loan Association, and more helped support Utah. The results of these programs were public buildings and irrigation, which provided relief and employment.

== Notable occurrences ==
While Blood was governor Utah became the thirty-sixth state to ratify the twenty-first amendment ending Prohibition. He was the first governor to occupy the governor's mansion donated by the Kearns family to the state in 1937. In 1939 he vetoed the proposals for junior colleges in Richfield and Roosevelt, as well as low-income housing, while cautioning about the expense. Also he worked to improve Utah's horrible highway safety record.

== Final years ==
Blood accepted a call to serve as a mission president in California for the LDS Church in January 1941. He died in Salt Lake City in 1942 from a cerebral hemorrhage.

Party political offices
| Preceded by George Dern | Democratic nominee for Governor of Utah; 1932, 1936 | Succeeded by Herbert B. Maw |
Political offices
| Preceded by George Dern | Governor of Utah; January 2, 1933 – January 6, 1941 | Succeeded by Herbert B. Maw |
