= J. Bracken Lee =

American politician, Governor of Utah 1949–1957

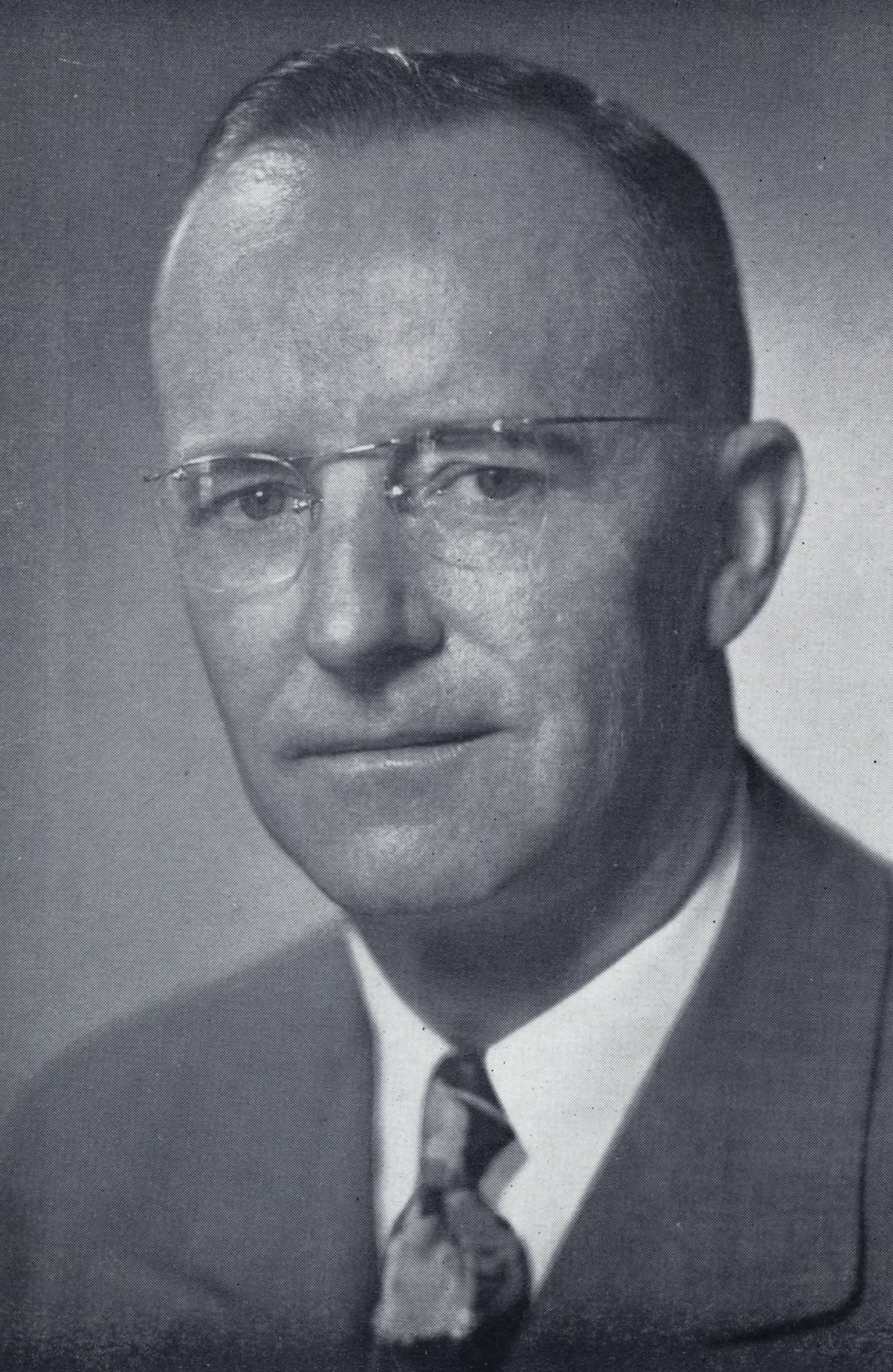

27th Mayor of Salt Lake City
- In office 1960–1972
- Preceded by: Adiel F. Stewart
- Succeeded by: Jake Garn

9th Governor of Utah
- In office January 3, 1949 – January 7, 1957
- Preceded by: Herbert Maw
- Succeeded by: George Clyde

Personal details
- Born: Joseph Bracken Lee; January 7, 1899 Price, Utah, U.S.
- Died: October 20, 1996 (aged 97) Salt Lake City, Utah, U.S.
- Resting place: Mount Olivet Cemetery; Salt Lake City, Utah, U.S.
- Party: Republican
- Spouses: Nellie Emilia Pace (m. 1922; died 1926); Margaret Ethel Draper (m. 1928; died 1989)
- Children: 4
- Profession: Politician, Insurance

Joseph Bracken Lee (January 7, 1899 – October 20, 1996) was an American political figure in the state of Utah. A Republican, he served two terms as the ninth governor of Utah (1949–1957), six two-year terms as mayor of Price, Utah (1935–1947), and three terms as the 27th mayor of Salt Lake City (1960–1971).

Lee was the most recent of three Governors of Utah who was not a member of the Church of Jesus Christ of Latter-day Saints (LDS Church), the other two being Simon Bamberger (1917–1921) and George Dern (1925–1933).

== Early life ==
Lee was born in Price, to Arthur J. Lee (1870–1934) and Ida Mae (Leiter) Lee (1874–1980). When he was five, the family moved to Fruita, Colorado, where they remained until he was in the eighth grade. The family then returned to Price.

During World War I, Lee served in the U.S. Army, lying about his age and passing up his high school graduation in order to enlist. During training in California, the Army kept him there as a trainer for the soldiers going to Europe, believing that he had the excellent people skills needed for this job. This was a decision that Lee initially regretted, as he wished to serve in combat. After the war, he joined his father in the insurance business in Price prior to going into politics.

Lee married Nellie Pace. Their daughter, Helen (Nelson), was born in 1922 (died 2005). Two years later Nellie became seriously ill, first with pneumonia, and then with Hodgkin's disease, of which she died in 1926. The medical expenses placed Lee in considerable debt. Until the debts were paid, Lee moved into his own garage and rented out his house. Another way he tried to save money was by eating only one hamburger and drinking a quart of milk a day. During this time, his daughter lived with Lee's parents. This experience helped form his fiscal conservatism, as he vowed he would never go into debt again.

On February 23, 1928, he married Margaret Draper (1909–1989) of Wellington, Utah. They had three children, a son, James (1930–2021), a daughter, Jon (Taylor) (born 1935), and a son, Richard (1944–2012).

Margaret fueled Lee's political ambition, encouraging his entry into politics and actively contributing to his career. Together, they made a formidable team. She had a remarkable memory for names, a skill helpful to Bracken in public life. Margaret was active in the Women's Literary Society. She also did historical research on prominent women in the West and gave speeches about them. Bracken and Margaret were married for 61 years, until her death in 1989.

Lee was an avid hunter and outdoorsman, particularly enjoying the high desert in eastern Utah near Price. He played semi-professional baseball as a young man, playing shortstop. He was also an extraordinary handyman, with skills in jewelry making and painting. He was a member of the Freemasons, Shriners, and Elks Lodge.

Lee died in Salt Lake City and is interred in a family plot at Mount Olivet Cemetery in Salt Lake City. Dying at 97 years of age, he lived longer than any other Utah Governor.

== Political career ==
Lee was fiscally conservative and a deep opponent of the income tax. With hefty cuts in spending, he was able to run surpluses in all of his administrations. As governor, he trimmed both spending and bureaucracy by cutting the number of departments and commissioners. He particularly angered the teachers' union for his cuts in higher education. In addition to his fierce opposition to the income tax, he opposed foreign aid and the United Nations. While Lee was the descendant of Mormons, he had no religious affiliation himself, but still enjoyed political success despite the fact that he was not a member of The Church of Jesus Christ of Latter-day Saints (LDS Church). Although he did not shy from criticism of the church, he was careful to maintain good diplomacy with its leadership.

Lee lost his first political campaign for mayor of Price in 1931. He returned in 1935 to win by just two votes, enjoying reelection another 5 times there. He lost two runs for governor in the 1940s before a successful bid in the fall of 1948. In 1956, he lost the Republican primary, which caused him to run a strong but unsuccessful race as an independent. He ran unsuccessfully for the Senate in both 1958 and 1962, and again for governor in 1964, though he was defeated in the Republican state convention. Under the political system at the time, if no candidate running for statewide office or House of Representatives got 80% of the delegate votes at the convention, a primary was held between the top two candidates. Lee came in third at the convention, which eliminated his candidacy.

In 1960, he was the Conservative Party's nominee for president. His Running Mate was Kent Courtney. They came in 9th place by popular vote.

== Firing of Police Chief Skousen ==
W. Cleon Skousen had served as Salt Lake City, Utah, police chief for four years before being fired. Salt Lake City had a weak-mayor system, with the mayor being a member of the five member commission. In 1960 Lee offered a motion to fire Skousen and the majority of the commission voted yes. This happened shortly after Skousen raided an illegal poker club, where Lee was in attendance. Lee characterized Skousen's strict enforcement of anti-gambling laws as "like a Gestapo."

== Legacy ==
Lee's biographer, Dennis Lythgoe, regards his greatest contribution his terms as mayor of Salt Lake City, where he brought fiscal responsibility and capital improvements to the city. With age having moderated his temper somewhat, he was more effective in office while remaining true to his principles.

Lee's legacy as governor is sometimes disputed. While many point to his temper, opinionated personality, and battles with educators as problems, he is also generally praised for his fiscal responsibility, and for the fact that Utah enjoyed a prosperous economy during his administration. Throughout his entire tenure, the state had a surplus rather than debt. Even Lee's political opponents respected his integrity and honest, open and straightforward ways of dealing.

Lee was often compared to President Harry S. Truman. Though the two had differing political viewpoints and were members of opposite parties, their personalities were similar. They shared folksy manners, never shied from stating their opinions, and were bluntly honest. With the two in office at the same time from 1949 to 1953, it was easy for many to compare the two.

== See also ==
- Old Right (United States)
- Criticism of the United Nations
- Income Tax: Root of All Evil

Party political offices
Preceded by Don B. Colton	Republican nominee for Governor of Utah; 1944, 1948, 1952	Succeeded by George Dewey Clyde
Political offices
Preceded by Herbert B. Maw	Governor of Utah; 1949–1957	Succeeded by George D. Clyde
Preceded by Adiel F. Stewart	Mayor of Salt Lake City; 1960–1971	Succeeded by Jake Garn
