= 1960 Utah gubernatorial election =

- November 8, 1960
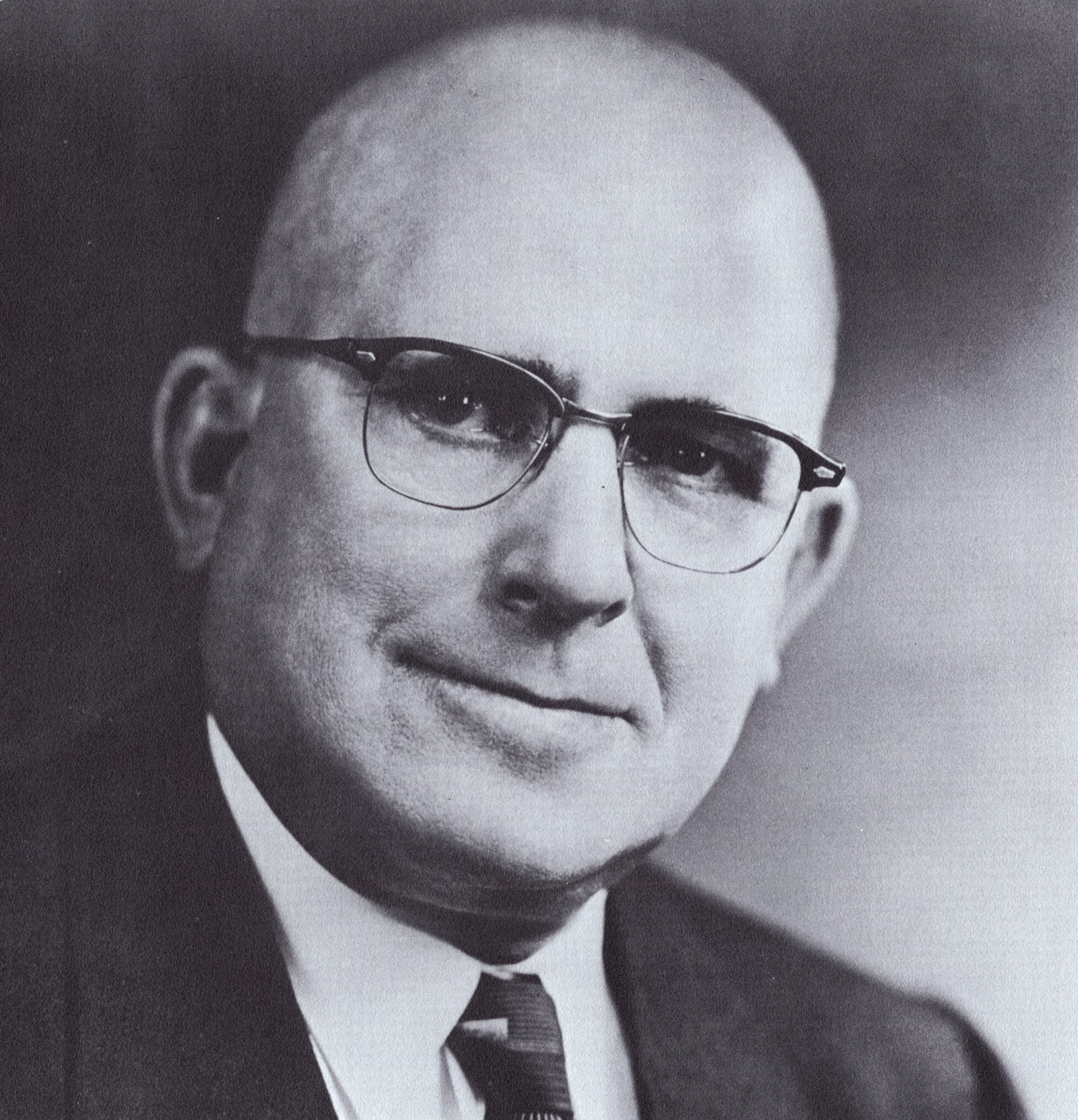

Nominee	George Dewey Clyde	William A. Barlocker
Party	Republican	Democratic
Popular vote	195,634	175,855
Percentage	52.66%	47.34%
- County results Clyde: 50–60% 60–70% 70–80% Barlocker: 50–60% 60–70% 70–80%
Governor before election
George Dewey Clyde
Republican
Elected Governor
George Dewey Clyde
Republican

The 1960 Utah gubernatorial election was held on November 8, 1960. Republican incumbent George Dewey Clyde defeated Democratic nominee William Arthur Barlocker with 52.66% of the vote.

This was the last time until 1984 that Utah would elect a Republican governor.

== Primary election ==
Primary elections were held on September 13, 1960.

=== Republican primary ===
==== Candidates ====
- George Dewey Clyde, incumbent Governor
- Lamont B. Gunderson, Salt Lake County commissioner

==== Results ====
Republican primary results
Party	Candidate	Votes	%
Republican	George Dewey Clyde (inc.)	50,592	57.76%
Republican	Lamont B. Gunderson	37,002	42.24%
Total votes		87,594	100.00%

=== Democratic primary ===
==== Candidates ====
- William Arthur Barlocker, mayor of St. George
- Ira A. Huggins, member of Utah State Senate

==== Results ====
Democratic primary results
Party	Candidate	Votes	%
Democratic	William Arthur Barlocker	74,424	70.56%
Democratic	Ira A. Huggins	31,045	29.44%
Total votes		105,469	100.00%

== General election ==
=== Candidates ===
- William Arthur Barlocker, Democratic
- George Dewey Clyde, Republican

=== Results ===
1960 Utah gubernatorial election
Party	Candidate	Votes	%	±%
Republican	George Dewey Clyde (incumbent)	195,634	52.66%	+14.46%
Democratic	William A. Barlocker	175,855	47.34%	+13.90%
Total votes		371,489	100.00%	
Majority		19,779	5.32%	
Republican hold		Swing	+0.56%	

=== Results by county ===
County	George Dewey Clyde Republican		William A. Barlocker Democratic		Margin		Total votes cast
County	#	%	#	%	#	%	Total votes cast
Beaver	731	34.48%	1,389	65.52%	-658	-31.04%	2,120
Box Elder	6,283	60.79%	4,053	39.21%	2,230	21.58%	10,336
Cache	9,415	62.19%	5,724	37.81%	3,691	24.38%	15,139
Carbon	2,420	27.16%	6,490	72.84%	-4,070	-45.68%	8,910
Daggett	194	44.70%	240	55.30%	-46	-10.60%	434
Davis	13,691	57.51%	10,115	42.49%	3,576	15.02%	23,806
Duchesne	1,401	52.04%	1,291	47.96%	110	4.09%	2,692
Emery	876	34.97%	1,629	65.03%	-753	-30.06%	2,505
Garfield	584	37.63%	968	62.37%	-384	-24.74%	1,552
Grand	1,011	52.66%	909	47.34%	102	5.31%	1,920
Iron	2,425	50.61%	2,367	49.39%	58	1.21%	4,792
Juab	1,090	46.42%	1,258	53.58%	-168	-7.16%	2,348
Kane	756	70.26%	320	29.74%	436	40.52%	1,076
Millard	1,821	49.79%	1,836	50.21%	-15	-0.41%	3,657
Morgan	729	52.64%	656	47.36%	73	5.27%	1,385
Piute	382	54.57%	318	45.43%	64	9.14%	700
Rich	528	66.08%	271	33.92%	257	32.17%	799
Salt Lake	89,892	54.42%	75,305	45.58%	14,587	8.83%	165,197
San Juan	1,126	50.81%	1,090	49.19%	36	1.62%	2,216
Sanpete	2,720	49.59%	2,765	50.41%	-45	-0.82%	5,485
Sevier	2,370	49.01%	2,466	50.99%	-96	-1.99%	4,836
Summit	1,386	49.45%	1,417	50.55%	-31	-1.11%	2,803
Tooele	2,751	41.28%	3,913	58.72%	-1,162	-17.44%	6,664
Uintah	2,562	60.34%	1,684	39.66%	878	20.68%	4,246
Utah	21,462	50.57%	20,975	49.43%	487	1.15%	42,437
Wasatch	1,385	54.66%	1,149	45.34%	236	9.31%	2,534
Washington	1,329	31.82%	2,847	68.18%	-1,518	-36.35%	4,176
Wayne	370	44.85%	455	55.15%	-85	-10.30%	825
Weber	23,944	52.17%	21,955	47.83%	1,989	4.33%	45,899
Total	195,634	52.66%	175,855	47.34%	19,779	5.32%	371,489

==== Counties that flipped from Democratic to Republican ====
- Weber

==== Counties that flipped from Independent to Republican ====
- Grand

==== Counties that flipped from Republican to Democratic ====
- Garfield
- Juab
- Millard
- Sanpete
- Sevier
- Summit
- Washington
- Wayne
