= 1948 Utah gubernatorial election =

- November 2, 1948
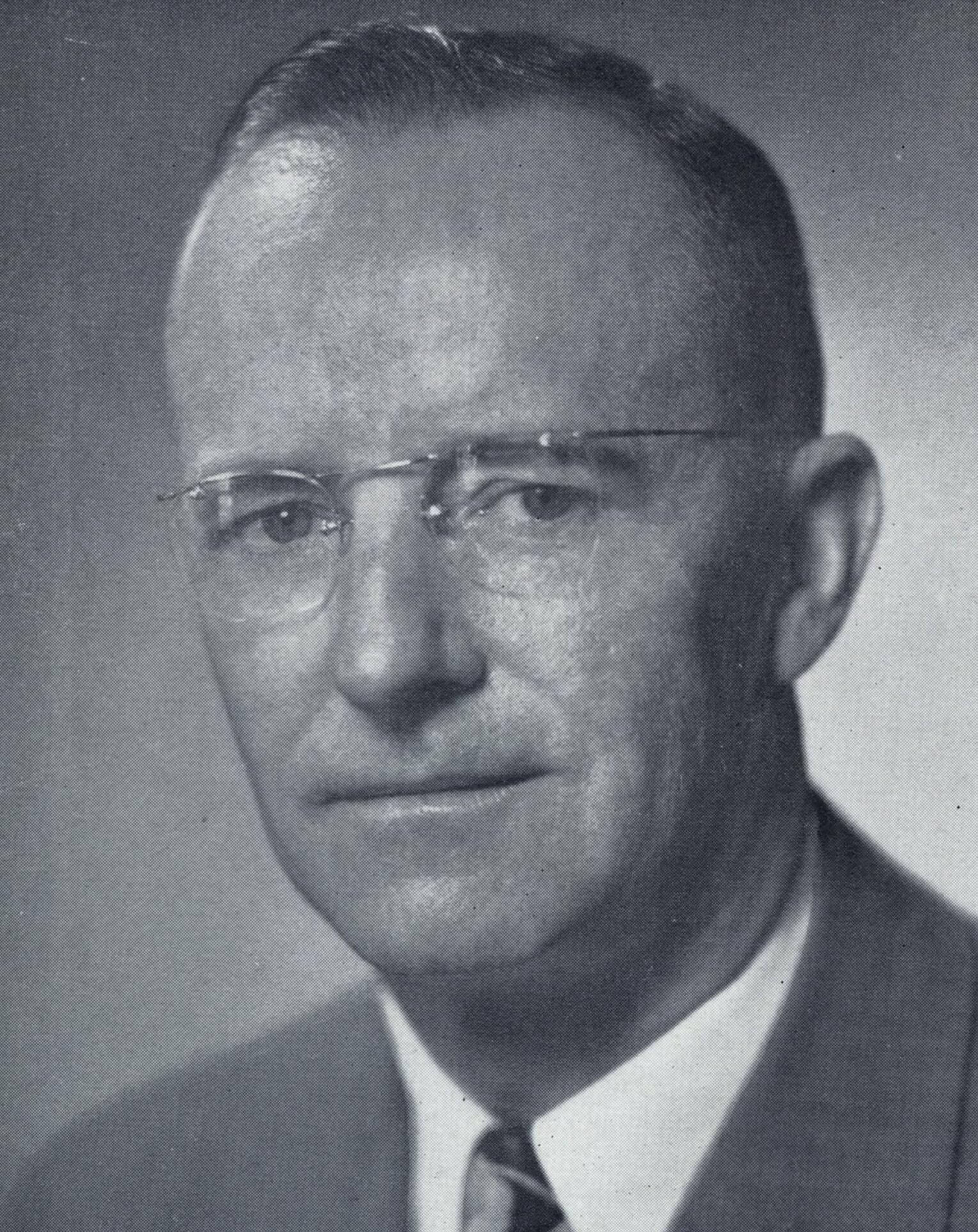

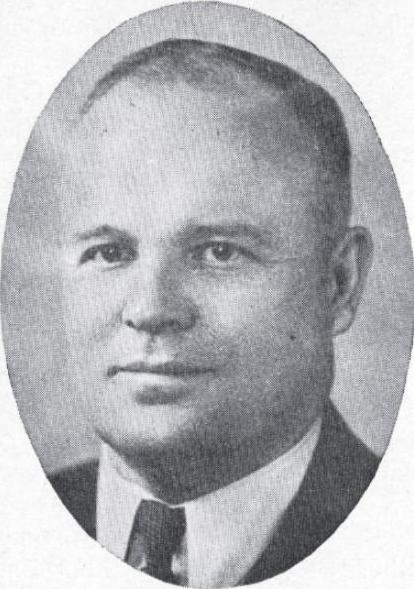
| Nominee | J. Bracken Lee | Herbert B. Maw |
| Party | Republican | Democratic |
| Popular vote | 151,253 | 123,814 |
| Percentage | 54.99% | 45.01% |
- County results Lee: 50–60% 60–70% 70–80% Maw: 50–60%
Governor before election
Herbert B. Maw
Democratic
Elected Governor
J. Bracken Lee
Republican

The 1948 Utah gubernatorial election was held on November 2, 1948. Incumbent Democratic governor Herbert B. Maw ran for a third consecutive term but lost to Republican nominee J. Bracken Lee in a rematch of the previous election.

== Primary election ==
Primary elections were held on September 7, 1948.

=== Democratic primary ===
==== Candidates ====
- John S. Boyden
- Herbert B. Maw, incumbent governor

==== Results ====
Democratic primary results
| Party | Candidate | Votes | % |
|---|---|---|---|
| Democratic | Herbert B. Maw (inc.) | 31,183 | 56.60% |
| Democratic | John S. Boyden | 23,911 | 43.40% |
| Total votes | | 55,094 | 100.00% |

=== Republican primary ===
==== Candidates ====
- J. Bracken Lee, Mayor of Price
- Rendell N. Mabey, Speaker of the Utah House of Representatives

==== Results ====
Republican primary results
| Party | Candidate | Votes | % |
|---|---|---|---|
| Republican | J. Bracken Lee | 42,417 | 62.53% |
| Republican | Rendell N. Mabey | 25,417 | 37.47% |
| Total votes | | 67,834 | 100.00% |

== General election ==
=== Candidates ===
- J. Bracken Lee, Republican
- Herbert B. Maw, Democratic

=== Results ===
1948 Utah gubernatorial election
| Party | Candidate | Votes | % | ±% |
|---|---|---|---|---|
| Republican | J. Bracken Lee | 151,253 | 54.99% | +5.20% |
| Democratic | Herbert B. Maw (incumbent) | 123,814 | 45.01% | −5.20% |
| Total votes | | 275,067 | 100.00% | |
| Majority | | 27,439 | 9.98% | |
| Republican gain from Democratic | | Swing | +10.40% | |

=== Results by county ===
| County | J. Bracken Lee Republican | | Herbert B. Maw Democratic | | Margin | | Total votes cast |
| County | # | % | # | % | # | % | Total votes cast |
|---|---|---|---|---|---|---|---|
| Beaver | 1,332 | 59.07% | 923 | 40.93% | 409 | 18.14% | 2,255 |
| Box Elder | 4,033 | 54.19% | 3,410 | 45.81% | 623 | 8.37% | 7,443 |
| Cache | 6,710 | 51.49% | 6,321 | 48.51% | 389 | 2.99% | 13,031 |
| Carbon | 5,060 | 54.48% | 4,227 | 45.52% | 833 | 8.97% | 9,287 |
| Daggett | 75 | 45.45% | 90 | 54.55% | -15 | -9.09% | 165 |
| Davis | 6,106 | 55.90% | 4,818 | 44.10% | 1,288 | 11.79% | 10,924 |
| Duchesne | 1,461 | 51.01% | 1,403 | 48.99% | 58 | 2.03% | 2,864 |
| Emery | 1,756 | 65.77% | 914 | 34.23% | 842 | 31.54% | 2,670 |
| Garfield | 1,044 | 66.41% | 528 | 33.59% | 516 | 32.82% | 1,572 |
| Grand | 516 | 62.62% | 308 | 37.38% | 208 | 25.24% | 824 |
| Iron | 2,558 | 65.27% | 1,361 | 34.73% | 1,197 | 30.54% | 3,919 |
| Juab | 1,616 | 55.53% | 1,294 | 44.47% | 322 | 11.07% | 2,910 |
| Kane | 766 | 77.06% | 228 | 22.94% | 538 | 54.12% | 994 |
| Millard | 2,371 | 59.17% | 1,636 | 40.83% | 735 | 18.34% | 4,007 |
| Morgan | 684 | 54.11% | 580 | 45.89% | 104 | 8.23% | 1,264 |
| Piute | 437 | 57.27% | 326 | 42.73% | 111 | 14.55% | 763 |
| Rich | 432 | 56.10% | 338 | 43.90% | 94 | 12.21% | 770 |
| Salt Lake | 61,463 | 52.91% | 54,693 | 47.09% | 6,770 | 5.83% | 116,156 |
| San Juan | 606 | 61.65% | 377 | 38.35% | 229 | 23.30% | 983 |
| Sanpete | 3,191 | 49.97% | 13,195 | 50.03% | -4 | -0.06% | 6,386 |
| Sevier | 3,159 | 66.90% | 1,563 | 33.10% | 1,596 | 33.80% | 4,722 |
| Summit | 1,926 | 60.11% | 1,278 | 39.89% | 648 | 20.22% | 3,204 |
| Tooele | 2,807 | 58.09% | 2,025 | 41.91% | 782 | 16.18% | 4,832 |
| Uintah | 1,523 | 48.55% | 1,614 | 51.45% | 91 | 2.90% | 3,137 |
| Utah | 17,428 | 58.46% | 12,386 | 41.54% | 5,042 | 16.91% | 29,814 |
| Wasatch | 1,198 | 50.13% | 1,192 | 49.87% | 6 | 0.25% | 2,390 |
| Washington | 2,045 | 56.51% | 1,574 | 43.49% | 471 | 13.01% | 3,619 |
| Wayne | 371 | 44.54% | 462 | 55.46% | -91 | -10.92% | 833 |
| Weber | 18,579 | 55.74% | 14,750 | 44.26% | 3,829 | 11.49% | 33,829 |
| Total | 151,253 | 54.99% | 123,814 | 45.01% | 27,439 | 9.98% | 275,067 |

==== Counties that flipped from Democratic to Republican ====
- Duchesne
- Salt Lake
- Tooele
- Washington
