= 1936 Utah gubernatorial election =

- November 3, 1936
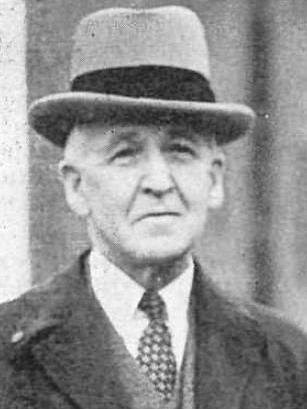

| Nominee | Henry H. Blood | Ray E. Dillman | Harman W. Peery |
| Party | Democratic | Republican | Independent-Progressive |
| Popular vote | 109,656 | 80,118 | 24,754 |
| Percentage | 50.95% | 37.22% | 11.50% |
- County results Blood: 40–50% 50–60% 60–70% Dillman: 40–50% 50–60% 60–70%
Governor before election
Henry H. Blood
Democratic
Elected Governor
Henry H. Blood
Democratic

The 1936 Utah gubernatorial election was held on November 3, 1936. Incumbent Democrat Henry H. Blood defeated Republican nominee Ray E. Dillman with 50.95% of the vote.

== General election ==
=== Candidates ===
Major party candidates

- Henry H. Blood, Democratic
- Ray E. Dillman, Republican

Other candidates

- Harman W. Peery, Progressive-Independent
- A. L. Porter, Socialist
- Wallace Talbot, Communist

=== Results ===
1936 Utah gubernatorial election
| Party | Candidate | Votes | % | ±% |
|---|---|---|---|---|
| Democratic | Henry H. Blood (incumbent) | 109,656 | 50.95% | −5.45% |
| Republican | Ray E. Dillman | 80,118 | 37.22% | −4.53% |
| Progressive-Independent | Harman W. Peery | 24,754 | 11.50% | |
| Socialist | A. L. Porter | 470 | 0.22% | −1.14% |
| Communist | Wallace Talbot | 230 | 0.11% | −0.38% |
| Total votes | | 215,228 | 100.00% | |
| Majority | | 29,538 | 13.72% | |
| Democratic hold | | Swing | -0.91% | |

=== Results by county ===
| County | Henry H. Blood Democratic | | Ray E. Dillman Republican | | Harman W. Peery Progressive | | A. L. Porter Socialist | | Wallace Talbot Communist | | Margin | | Total votes cast |
| County | # | % | # | % | # | % | # | % | # | % | # | % | Total votes cast |
|---|---|---|---|---|---|---|---|---|---|---|---|---|---|
| Beaver | 1,082 | 48.11% | 1,077 | 47.89% | 50 | 2.22% | 40 | 1.78% | 0 | 0.00% | 5 | 0.22% | 2,249 |
| Box Elder | 3,680 | 51.20% | 2,808 | 39.07% | 677 | 9.42% | 20 | 0.28% | 3 | 0.04% | 872 | 12.13% | 7,188 |
| Cache | 6,871 | 57.77% | 4,164 | 35.01% | 844 | 7.10% | 13 | 0.11% | 1 | 0.01% | 2,707 | 22.76% | 11,893 |
| Carbon | 3,639 | 56.37% | 2,142 | 33.18% | 612 | 9.48% | 34 | 0.53% | 28 | 0.43% | 1,497 | 23.19% | 6,455 |
| Daggett | 127 | 60.48% | 83 | 39.52% | 0 | 0.00% | 0 | 0.00% | 0 | 0.00% | 44 | 20.95% | 210 |
| Davis | 3,285 | 56.15% | 2,061 | 35.23% | 498 | 8.51% | 5 | 0.09% | 1 | 0.02% | 1,224 | 20.92% | 5,850 |
| Duchesne | 1,362 | 45.02% | 1,569 | 51.87% | 87 | 2.88% | 7 | 0.23% | 0 | 0.00% | -207 | -6.84% | 3,025 |
| Emery | 1,360 | 47.59% | 1,273 | 44.54% | 212 | 7.42% | 13 | 0.45% | 0 | 0.00% | 87 | 3.04% | 2,858 |
| Garfield | 802 | 45.36% | 940 | 53.17% | 26 | 1.47% | 0 | 0.00% | 0 | 0.00% | -138 | -7.81% | 1,768 |
| Grand | 498 | 61.63% | 274 | 33.91% | 31 | 3.84% | 5 | 0.62% | 0 | 0.00% | 224 | 27.72% | 808 |
| Iron | 1,598 | 48.78% | 1,498 | 45.73% | 141 | 4.30% | 38 | 1.16% | 1 | 0.03% | 100 | 3.05% | 3,276 |
| Juab | 1,661 | 49.88% | 1,401 | 42.07% | 255 | 7.66% | 11 | 0.33% | 2 | 0.06% | 260 | 7.81% | 3,330 |
| Kane | 325 | 36.11% | 561 | 62.33% | 11 | 1.22% | 3 | 0.33% | 0 | 0.00% | -236 | -26.22% | 900 |
| Millard | 1,855 | 48.60% | 1,883 | 49.33% | 70 | 1.83% | 9 | 0.24% | 0 | 0.00% | -28 | -0.73% | 3,817 |
| Morgan | 482 | 39.51% | 619 | 50.74% | 118 | 9.67% | 1 | 0.08% | 0 | 0.00% | -137 | -11.23% | 1,220 |
| Piute | 460 | 48.83% | 459 | 48.73% | 21 | 2.23% | 2 | 0.21% | 0 | 0.00% | 1 | 0.11% | 942 |
| Rich | 441 | 50.40% | 414 | 47.31% | 20 | 2.29% | 0 | 0.00% | 0 | 0.00% | 27 | 3.09% | 875 |
| Salt Lake | 47,912 | 55.55% | 29,024 | 33.65% | 9,055 | 10.50% | 111 | 0.13% | 144 | 0.17% | 18,888 | 21.90% | 86,246 |
| San Juan | 493 | 51.89% | 447 | 47.05% | 6 | 0.63% | 2 | 0.21% | 2 | 0.21% | 46 | 4.84% | 950 |
| Sanpete | 3,070 | 45.82% | 3,294 | 49.16% | 322 | 4.81% | 13 | 0.19% | 1 | 0.01% | -224 | -3.34% | 6,700 |
| Sevier | 1,942 | 40.90% | 2,521 | 53.10% | 259 | 5.45% | 16 | 0.34% | 10 | 0.21% | -579 | -12.19% | 4,748 |
| Summit | 1,657 | 44.10% | 1,733 | 46.13% | 357 | 9.50% | 6 | 0.16% | 4 | 0.11% | -76 | -2.02% | 3,757 |
| Tooele | 1,747 | 53.21% | 1,169 | 35.61% | 353 | 10.75% | 12 | 0.37% | 2 | 0.06% | 578 | 17.61% | 3,283 |
| Uintah | 1,365 | 41.76% | 1,822 | 55.74% | 73 | 2.23% | 8 | 0.24% | 1 | 0.03% | -457 | -13.98% | 3,269 |
| Utah | 9,861 | 47.95% | 8,524 | 41.45% | 2,108 | 10.25% | 57 | 0.28% | 17 | 0.08% | 1,337 | 6.50% | 20,567 |
| Wasatch | 901 | 38.77% | 1,369 | 58.91% | 52 | 2.24% | 2 | 0.09% | 0 | 0.00% | -468 | -20.14% | 2,324 |
| Washington | 1,618 | 51.50% | 1,466 | 46.66% | 54 | 1.72% | 4 | 0.13% | 0 | 0.00% | 152 | 4.84% | 3,142 |
| Wayne | 450 | 52.63% | 397 | 46.43% | 7 | 0.82% | 1 | 0.12% | 0 | 0.00% | 53 | 6.20% | 855 |
| Weber | 9,112 | 40.10% | 5,126 | 22.56% | 8,435 | 37.12% | 37 | 0.16% | 13 | 0.06% | 677 (Note: Blood's margin over Peery) | 2.98% | 22,723 |
| Total | 109,656 | 50.95% | 80,118 | 37.22% | 24,754 | 11.50% | 470 | 0.22% | 230 | 0.11% | 29,538 | 13.72% | 215,228 |

==== Counties that flipped from Republican to Democratic ====
- Beaver
- Daggett
- Emery
- Iron
- Piute
- Rich
- Washington
- Wayne

==== Counties that flipped from Democratic to Republican ====
- Duchesne
- Summit
- Uintah
