= 1944 Utah gubernatorial election =

- November 7, 1944
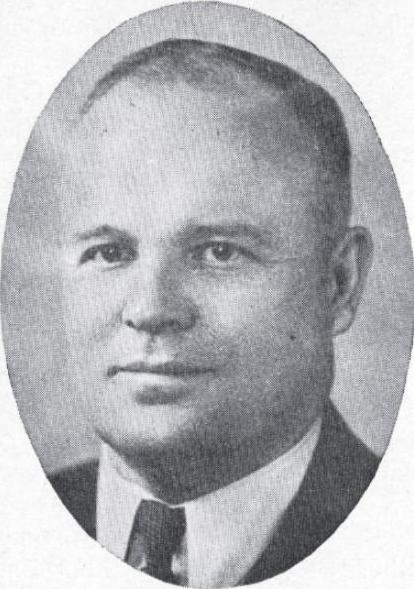

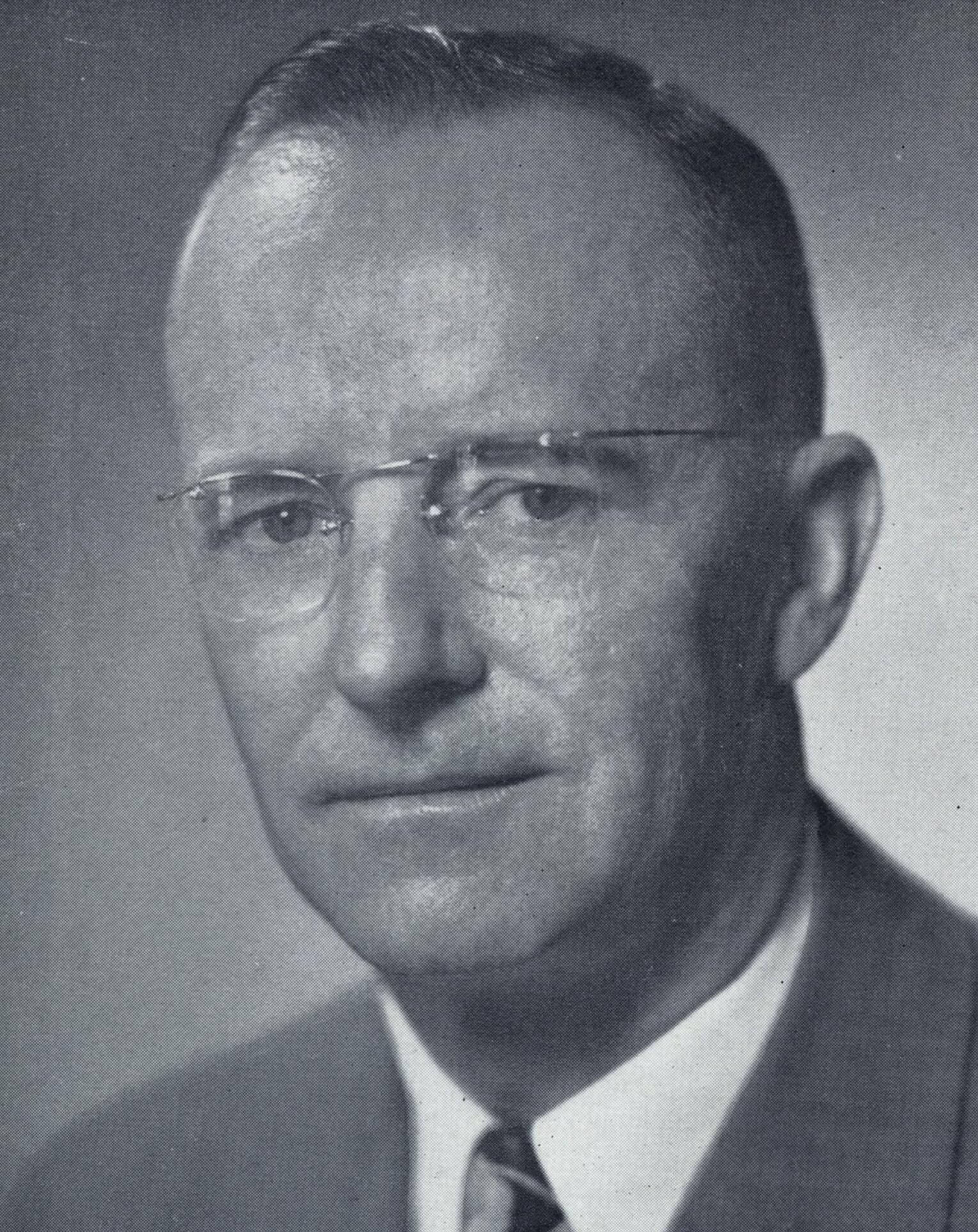
Nominee	Herbert B. Maw	J. Bracken Lee
Party	Democratic	Republican
Popular vote	123,907	122,851
Percentage	50.21%	49.79%
- County results Maw: 50–60% Lee: 50–60% 60–70% 70–80%
Governor before election
Herbert B. Maw
Democratic
Elected Governor
Herbert B. Maw
Democratic

The 1944 Utah gubernatorial election was held on November 7, 1944. Incumbent Democrat Herbert B. Maw defeated Republican nominee J. Bracken Lee with 50.21% of the vote. This is the closest gubernatorial election in Utah to date.

This is also the last time a Democrat was elected Governor until 1964.

== Primary election ==
Primary elections were held on July 11, 1944. No runoffs were required in the gubernatorial primaries.

=== Democratic primary ===
==== Candidates ====
- Stanley N. Child
- Herbert B. Maw, incumbent governor

==== Results ====
Democratic primary results
Party	Candidate	Votes	%
Democratic	Herbert B. Maw (inc.)	25,774	62.79%
Democratic	Stanley N. Child	15,274	37.21%
Total votes		41,048	100.00%

=== Republican primary ===
==== Candidates ====
- J. Bracken Lee, Mayor of Price
- Reed E. Vetterli

==== Results ====
Republican primary results
Party	Candidate	Votes	%
Republican	J. Bracken Lee	23,677	65.46%
Republican	Reed E. Vetterli	12,493	34.54%
Total votes		36,170	100.00%

== General election ==
=== Candidates ===
- Herbert B. Maw, Democratic
- J. Bracken Lee, Republican

=== Results ===
1944 Utah gubernatorial election
Party	Candidate	Votes	%	±%
Democratic	Herbert B. Maw (incumbent)	123,907	50.21%	−1.86%
Republican	J. Bracken Lee	122,851	49.79%	+2.09%
Total votes		246,758	100.00%	
Majority		1,056	0.43%	
Democratic hold		Swing	-3.95%	

=== Results by county ===
County	Herbert B. Maw Democratic		J. Bracken Lee Republican		Margin		Total votes cast
County	#	%	#	%	#	%	Total votes cast
Beaver	924	44.25%	1,164	55.75%	-240	-11.49%	2,088
Box Elder	3,537	49.21%	3,651	50.79%	-114	-1.59%	7,188
Cache	5,589	47.11%	6,274	52.89%	-685	-5.77%	11,863
Carbon	3,284	42.78%	4,392	57.22%	-1,108	-14.43%	7,676
Daggett	93	54.07%	79	45.93%	14	8.14%	172
Davis	4,306	48.96%	4,489	51.04%	-183	-2.08%	8,795
Duchesne	1,548	56.31%	1,201	43.69%	347	12.62%	2,749
Emery	1,030	43.30%	1,349	56.70%	-319	-13.41%	2,379
Garfield	493	34.96%	917	65.04%	-424	-30.07%	1,410
Grand	292	35.92%	521	64.08%	-229	-28.17%	813
Iron	1,505	41.51%	2,121	58.49%	-616	-16.99%	3,626
Juab	1,269	47.58%	1,398	52.42%	-129	-4.84%	2,667
Kane	246	27.73%	641	72.27%	-395	-44.53%	887
Millard	1,749	46.42%	2,019	53.58%	-270	-7.17%	3,768
Morgan	510	42.36%	694	57.64%	-184	-15.28%	1,204
Piute	272	37.11%	461	62.89%	-189	-25.78%	733
Rich	352	44.61%	437	55.39%	-85	-10.77%	789
Salt Lake	58,315	55.46%	46,828	44.54%	11,487	10.93%	105,143
San Juan	410	46.91%	464	53.09%	-54	-6.18%	874
Sanpete	3,179	51.04%	3,049	48.96%	130	2.09%	6,228
Sevier	1,686	38.04%	2,746	61.96%	-1,060	-23.92%	4,432
Summit	1,444	44.96%	1,768	55.04%	-324	-10.09%	3,212
Tooele	2,296	50.66%	2,236	49.34%	60	1.32%	4,532
Uintah	1,560	52.12%	1,433	47.88%	127	4.24%	2,993
Utah	11,505	45.28%	13,906	54.72%	-2,401	-9.45%	25,411
Wasatch	1,121	48.53%	1,189	51.47%	-68	-2.94%	2,310
Washington	1,633	50.02%	1,632	49.98%	1	0.03%	3,265
Wayne	406	54.06%	345	45.94%	61	8.12%	751
Weber	13,353	46.36%	15,447	53.64%	-2,094	-7.27%	28,800
Total	123,907	50.21%	122,851	49.79%	1,056	0.43%	246,758

==== Counties that flipped from Republican to Democratic ====
- Duchesne
- Sanpete
- Uintah
- Washington
- Wayne

==== Counties that flipped from Democratic to Republican ====
- Carbon
- Emery
- Juab
- Utah
- Weber
