= Mayor of Salt Lake County =

Political position in the United States

Mayor of Salt Lake County, Utah
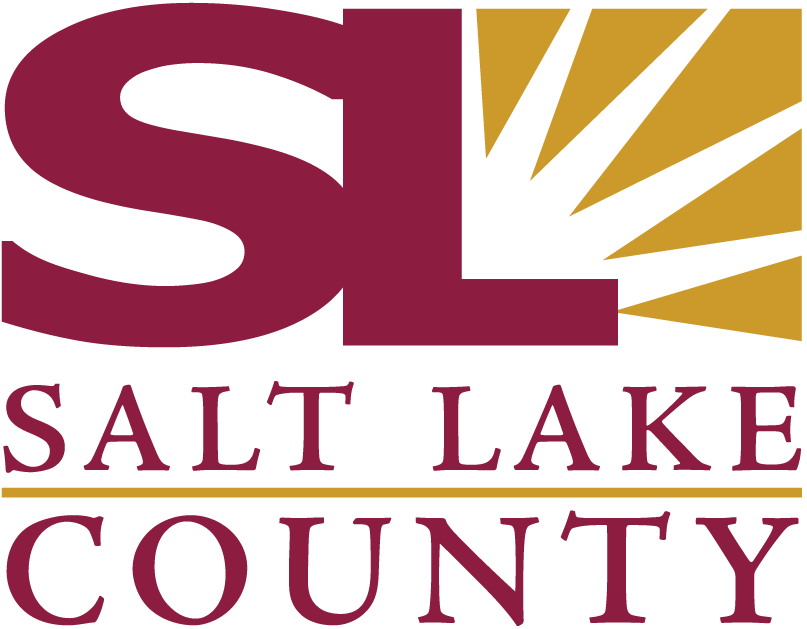
- Salt Lake County logo
- Incumbent; Jenny Wilson since January 29, 2019
- Residence: Salt Lake County Government Center; 2001 South State Street, Salt Lake City, Utah
- Term length: 4 years
- Inaugural holder: Nancy Workman
- Formation: 2001
- Website: Mayor's Office

The Mayor of Salt Lake County is the head of the executive branch of the county government of Salt Lake County, Utah in the United States.

As the mayor of the county, the mayor serves over one million people (1,160,437 according to 2019 estimates), making it the 37th most populous county in the United States, with population greater than 9 least populous states of the United States, and approximately 36 percent of Utah state population.

The mayor serves a four-year term without term limits, and is chosen in countywide partisan elections.

Since the election of Nancy Workman as the first mayor in 2000, five people have held the office, three of them elected. Peter Corroon, serving from 2005 to 2013, holds the longest tenure.

The current mayor, Jenny Wilson, was appointed by the Salt Lake County Democratic Party central committee on January 29, 2019, to fill the vacancy left by the resignation of two-term incumbent Ben McAdams on January 2, 2019 after being elected to represent Utah's 4th congressional district in the United States House of Representatives.

== History ==
Salt Lake County was designated in 1849 as one of the five counties of the provisional State of Deseret, and officially organized on January 31, 1850, becoming a county in the Utah Territory organized on September 9, 1850.

Under the Utah Code (Title 17, Chapter 52a, Part 2), counties in the state are allowed to choose one of four forms of government:

- a three-member full-time commission;
- a five or seven member expanded commission;
- a three, five, seven or nine member part-time council with a full-time elected county mayor;
- or a three, five, seven or nine member part-time council with a full-time manager appointed by the council.

Originally, like other counties in the state, Salt Lake County was governed by the standard three-member commission. However, in 1987, Cache County became the first to switch to a seven-member council with an elected mayor. On November 3, 1998, Salt Lake County, alongside Morgan and Weber held elections on changing the form of their county governments. Salt Lake County voters approved the change in government to a nine-member council with an elected mayor by 9,844 votes out of 179,172 cast (52.75% to 47.25%). In 2000, the first elections for the County mayor were held, which were won by Republican Nancy Workman.

In 2004, Workman was accused of misuse of funds, but resolved to still run for re-election, before dropping out on October 12, 2004. To date, she has remained the only Republican to hold the County Mayor's office.

== Duties and power ==
The mayor does not hold supervisory authority over the other 17 elected officials of the county (the council, assessor, auditor, clerk, district attorney, recorder, sheriff, surveyor and treasurer).

The mayor enforces policies established by the County Council by assigning work in the executive branch including Public Works, Human Services, and Community and Support Services as well as exercising power of veto. Duties include:

- The direction and management of executive branch departments, including Public Works, Human Services, and Community and Support.
- Services, but not including the executive activities of the independent elected officials.
- Carrying out and enforcing the programs and policies established by the Council.
- Enforcing the regulations, policies, and procedures of the County.
- Faithfully executing the laws and ordinances of the County.
- Assigning employees and work in the executive branch.
- Appointing persons to serve on commissions and boards, with advice and consent.
- Controlling County assets, funds, and property; preparing and presenting a budget to the Council.
- Reviewing County books, accounts, and funds necessary to the executive function.
- Negotiating and executing contracts.
- Considering and adopting long-range planning.
- Acting as intergovernmental relations liaison, exercising power of veto and line item veto, and attending and participating in Council meetings.

== Elections ==
The mayor is elected in partisan elections at-large every four years, during the presidential elections, composed of two stages: a primary election held in June and general election held in November.

== List of Salt Lake County mayors ==
#	Image	Name	Term began	Term ended	Party	Notes
1		Nancy Workman	January 3, 2001	September 7, 2004	Republican	Elected in 2000. Placed on paid administrative leave in 2004.
2		Alan Dayton	September 7, 2004	January 3, 2005	Republican	Acting mayor until expiration of Workman's term
3		Peter Corroon	January 3, 2005	January 3, 2013	Democratic	Elected in 2004. Re-elected in 2008. Retired.
4		Ben McAdams	January 7, 2013	January 2, 2019	Democratic	Elected in 2012. Re-elected in 2016. Resigned having been elected to the United States House of Representatives.
5		Jenny Wilson	January 29, 2019	Incumbent	Democratic	First elected by party central committee in 2019. Re-elected in 2020. Re-elected in 2024
