= 2023 Salt Lake City mayoral election =

- November 21, 2023
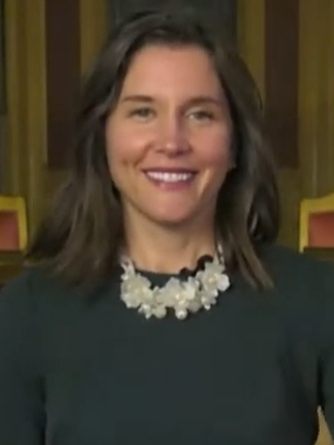

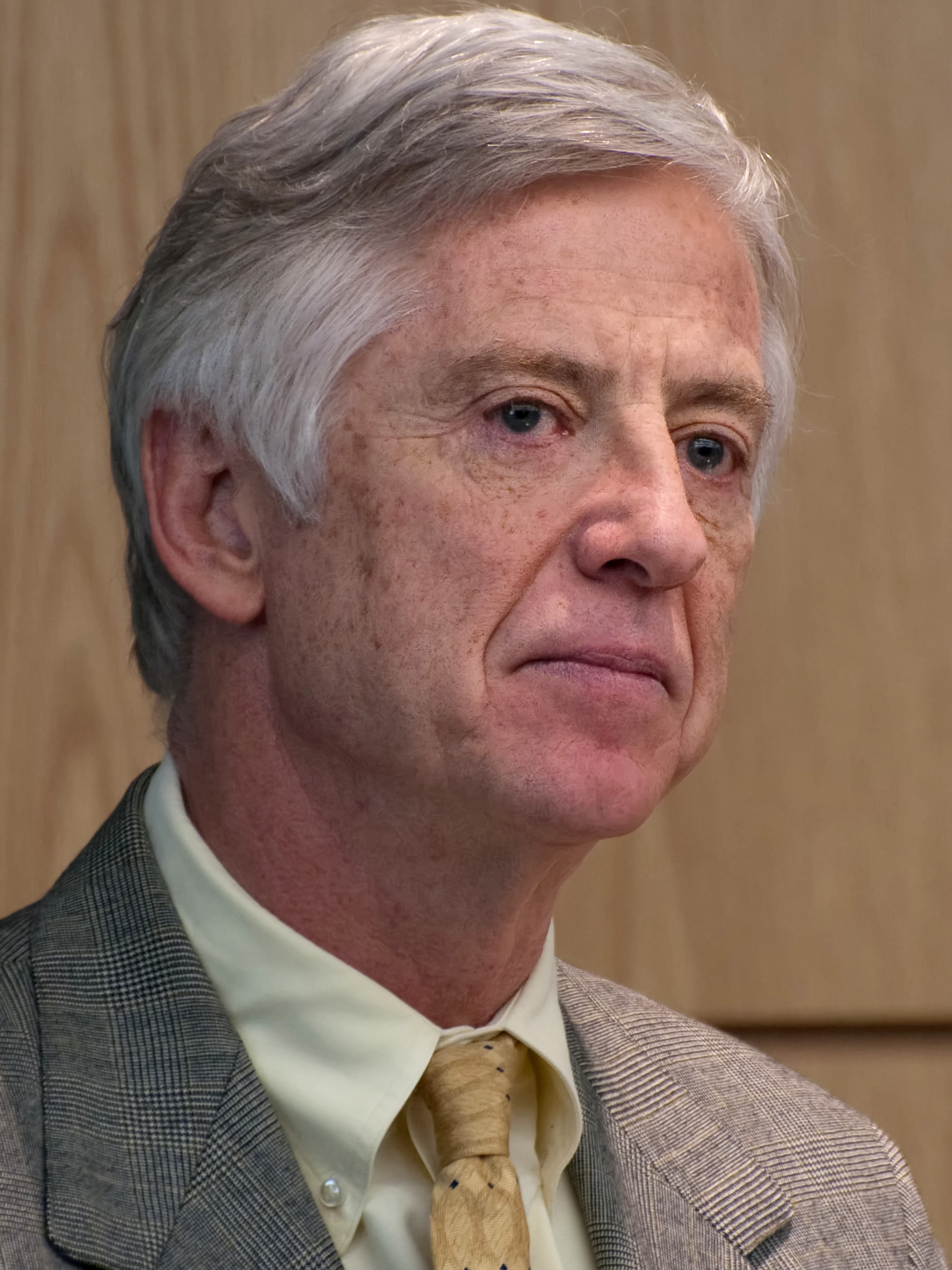

Candidate	Erin Mendenhall	Rocky Anderson	Michael Valentine
Popular vote	25,770	15,183	3,113
Percentage	58.48%	34.46%	7.06%
Mayor before election
Erin Mendenhall
Elected mayor
Erin Mendenhall

The 2023 Salt Lake City mayoral election took place on November 21, 2023, to elect the mayor of Salt Lake City, Utah. The election was officially nonpartisan. Incumbent mayor Erin Mendenhall won reelection to a second term in office, defeating former mayor Rocky Anderson and filmmaker Michael Valentine. This was the first mayoral election in the city's history to utilize ranked-choice voting, although Mendenhall won a majority of votes in the initial round, so no ranked-choice tabulation was necessary.

== Candidates ==
=== Declared ===
- Rocky Anderson, former mayor (party affiliation: Democratic)
- Erin Mendenhall, incumbent mayor (party affiliation: Democratic)
- Michael Valentine, filmmaker

== Endorsements ==
Rocky Anderson

State legislators

- Phil Lyman, state representative from the 69th district (2019–present) (Republican)

Individuals

- David Ibarra, 2019 mayoral candidate

Political parties

- Utah and Salt Lake County Democratic Party Black Caucus
Erin Mendenhall

U.S. representatives

- Ben McAdams, former U.S. representative from UT-04 (2019–2021) and former mayor of Salt Lake County (2013–2019)
- Karen Shepherd, former U.S. representative from UT-02 (1993–1995)

State officials

- Spencer Cox, governor of Utah (2021–present) (Republican)
- Gary Herbert, former governor of Utah (2009–2021) (Republican)

State senators

- Nate Blouin, state senator from the 13th district (2023–present)
- Stephanie Pitcher, state senator from the 14th district (2023–present)

State representatives

- Joel Briscoe, state representative from the 24th district (2010–present)
- Jennifer Dailey-Provost, state representative from the 22nd district (2019–present)
- Sandra Hollins, state representative from the 21st district (2015–present)
- Brian King, state representative from the 23rd district (2009–present)
- Angela Romero, Utah House of Representatives minority leader (2023–present) from the 25th district (2013–present)

Municipal officials

- Jim Bradley, at-large Salt Lake County Councilor (2000–present)
- Arlyn Bradshaw, Salt Lake County Councilor from the 1st district (2010–present)
- Ann Granato, Salt Lake County Councilor from the 4th district (2018–present)
- Suzanne Harrison, at-large Salt Lake County Councilor (2023–present)
- Jenny Wilson, mayor of Salt Lake County (2019–present)

Local officials

- All 7 Salt Lake City Council members
- Ralph Becker, former mayor of Salt Lake City (2008–2016)
- Palmer DePaulis, former mayor of Salt Lake City (1985–1992)
- Esther Stowell, vice chair of the Poplar Grove Community Council
- Ted Wilson, former mayor of Salt Lake City (1976–1985)

Labor unions

- American Federation of State, County and Municipal Employees Local 1004
- International Association of Fire Fighters Locals 81 and 1696
- International Association of Heat and Frost Insulators and Allied Workers Local 57
- International Brotherhood of Electrical Workers Local 57
- International Union of Bricklayers and Allied Craftworkers Local 1
- International Union of Operating Engineers Local 3
- Laborers' International Union of North America Local 295
- Salt Lake City Police Association
- United Association Local 140
- Utah AFL-CIO and Central Utah AFL-CIO
- Utah and Salt Lake City Education Association PAC
- Utah Federation of Teachers

Organizations

- 314 Action
- EMILY's List
- Equality Utah
- Planned Parenthood Action Council of Utah
Michael Valentine

Individuals

- Cornel West, social critic

Organizations

- Salt Lake City Democratic Socialists of America

== Campaign finances ==
Campaign finances	Total spending	Cash on hand
Erin Mendenhall	$480,000	$291,000
Rocky Anderson	$231,000	$83,000
Michael Valentine	$2,000	$367

== Results ==
2023 Salt Lake City mayoral election
Candidate	Round 1	
Candidate	Votes	%
Erin Mendenhall (incumbent)	25,770	58.48%
Rocky Anderson	15,183	34.46%
Michael Valentine	3,113	7.06%
Total	44,066	100.00%
