= 2000 Salt Lake County Council election =

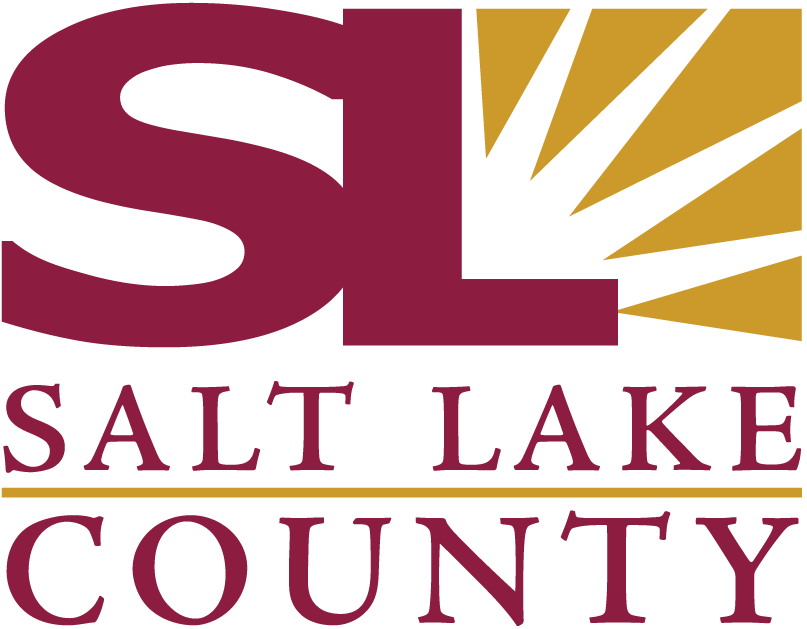
- November 7, 2000

All 9 seats in the Salt Lake County Council 5 seats needed for a majority
	Majority party	Minority party
Party	Republican	Democratic
Seats won	6; 1 at-large 5 districts	3; 2 at-large 1 district
Percentage	66.67%	33.33%

The 2000 Salt Lake County Council election was held on Tuesday, November 7, 2000, to elect the first members of the newly formed Salt Lake County Council. The election coincided with other elections, such as county mayor, presidential and governor.

Utah Code (Title 17, Chapter 52a, Part 2) allows counties in the state to choose one of four forms of county government:

- Standard three-member full-time commission,
- Expanded five- or seven-member full-time commission,
- Three-, five-, seven- or nine-member part-time council with a full-time appointed manager,
- or a three-, five-, seven- or nine-member part-time council with a full-time elected mayor.

Like most counties in Utah, Salt Lake County was originally governed by a basic three-member commission. However, during the 1998 election cycle, county voters approved the change in form of county government to a nine-member council with an elected county mayor.

Republicans dominated the election, winning six out of nine council seats in the Republican-leaning large urban county.

== Election results ==
The Salt Lake County council consists of nine seats: three alphabetical districts are at-large and elected to six-year terms, while six numerical districts are sectioned into separate districts and elected to four year terms. However, since the council was newly formed and would take office in January 2001, in this election, all council seats were elected.

=== At-large seat A ===
Salt Lake County Council seat A
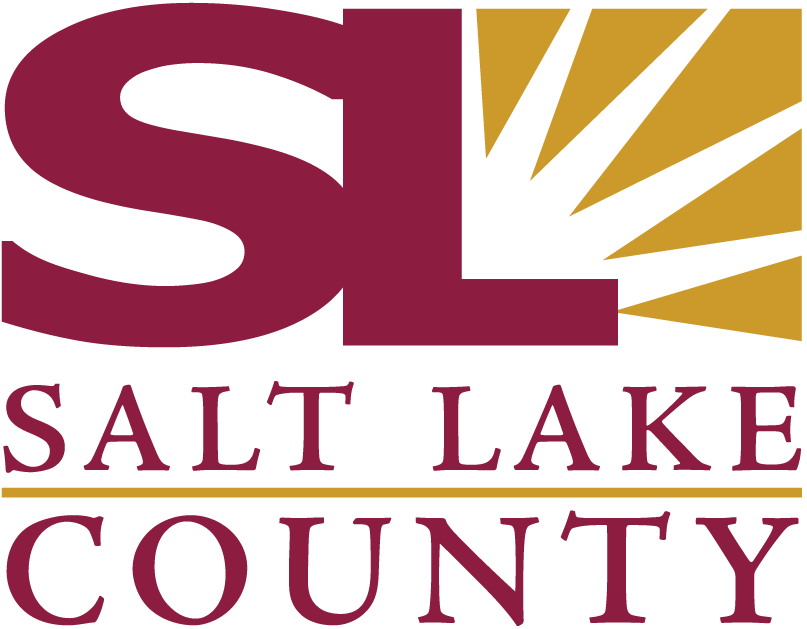
Nominee	Randy Horiuchi	Richard Snelgrove
Party	Democratic	Republican
Popular vote	143,498	137,265
Percentage	47.97%	45.89%
Elected Councilman
Randy Horiuchi
Democratic

2000 Salt Lake County Council at-large seat A
Party	Candidate	Votes	%
Democratic	Randy Horiuchi	143,498	47.97
Republican	Richard Snelgrove	137,265	45.89
Independent American	Phillip Holmes	10,380	3.47
Libertarian	Cabot W. M. Nelson	7,973	2.67
Majority		6,233	2.08
Turnout		299,116	67.34
Democratic win (new seat)			

=== At-large seat B ===
Salt Lake County Council at-large seat B
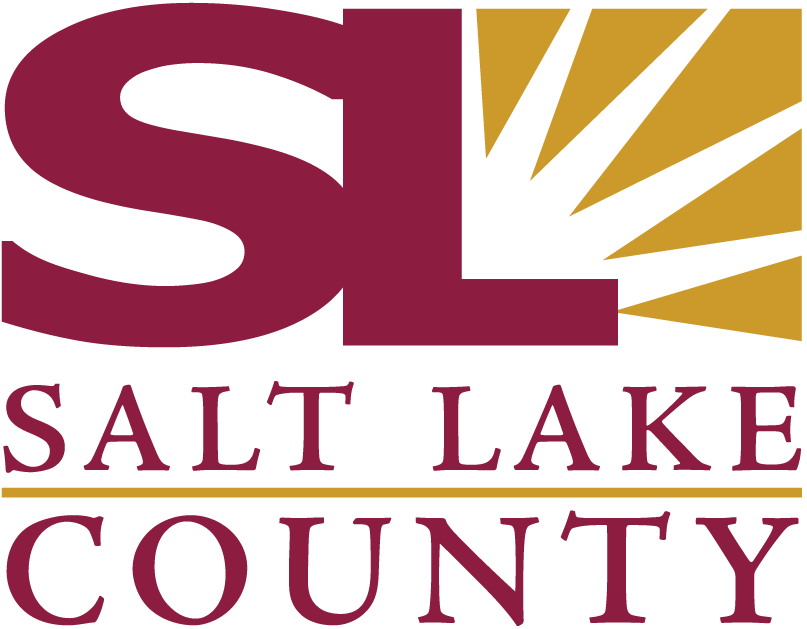
Nominee	Steve Harmsen	M. Carl Larsen
Party	Republican	Democratic
Popular vote	153,977	124,382
Percentage	52.69%	42.57%
Elected Councilman
Steve Harmsen
Republican

2000 Salt Lake County Council seat B
Party	Candidate	Votes	%
Republican	Steve Harmsen	153,977	52.69
Democratic	M. Carl Larsen	124,382	42.57
Libertarian	John R. Pack	13,849	4.74
Write-in	Nathan Dean "Nate" Gedge	8	0.00
Majority		29,595	10.12
Turnout		292,216	65.79
Republican win (new seat)			

=== At-large seat C ===
Salt Lake County Council at-large seat C
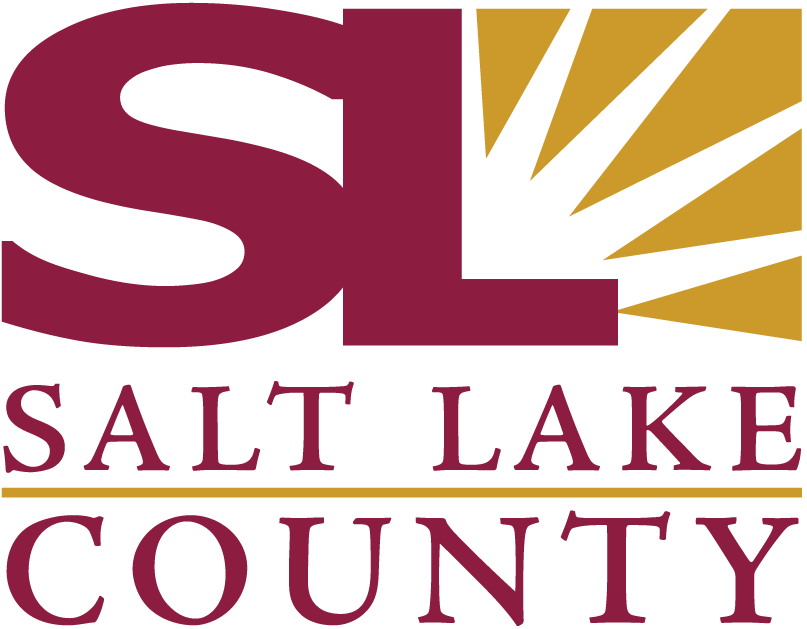
Nominee	Jim Bradley	James B. Kennard
Party	Democratic	Republican
Popular vote	143,053	140,694
Percentage	48.45%	47.65%
Elected Councilman
Jim Bradley
Democratic

2000 Salt Lake County Council seat C
Party	Candidate	Votes	%
Democratic	Jim Bradley	143,053	48.45
Republican	James B. Kennard	140,694	47.65
Libertarian	Don W. Johnstun	11,527	3.9
Majority		2,359	0.8
Turnout		295,274	66.48
Democratic win (new seat)			

=== District 1 ===
Salt Lake County Council 1st district
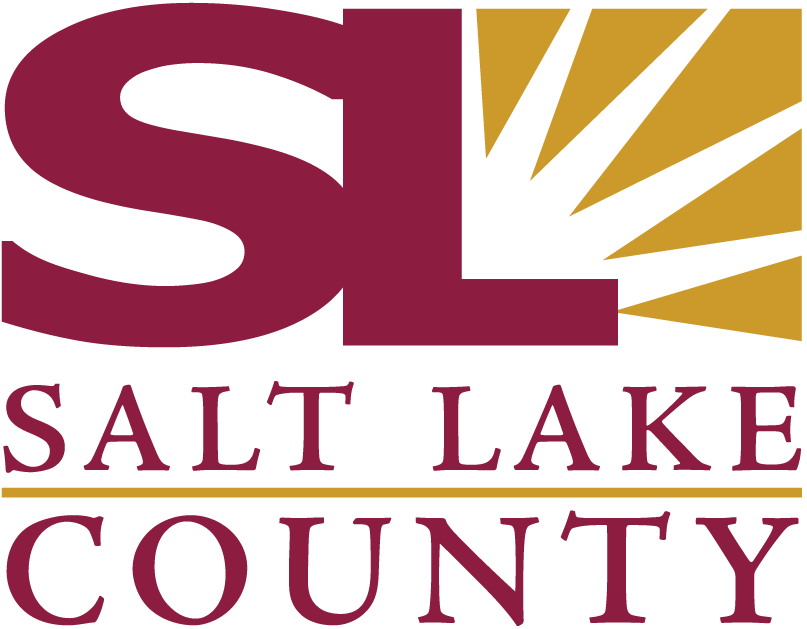
Nominee	Joe Hatch	Genevieve Atwood
Party	Democratic	Republican
Popular vote	26,584	18,441
Percentage	59.04%	40.96%
Elected Councilman
Joe Hatch
Democratic

2000 Salt Lake County Council district 1
Party	Candidate	Votes	%
Democratic	Joe Hatch	26,584	59.04
Republican	Genevieve Atwood	18,441	40.96
Majority		8,143	18.08
Turnout		45,025	60.08
Democratic win (new seat)			

=== District 2 ===
Salt Lake County Council 2nd district
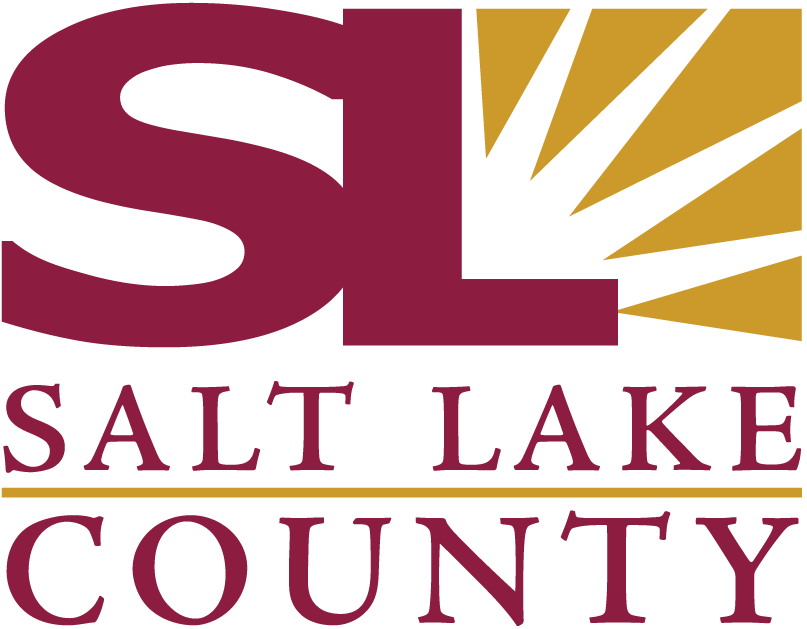
Nominee	Michael H. Jensen	Jim Brusatto
Party	Republican	Democratic
Popular vote	27,290	17,965
Percentage	57.41%	37.79%
Elected Councilman
Michael H. Jensen
Republican

2000 Salt Lake County Council district 2
Party	Candidate	Votes	%
Republican	Michael H. Jensen	27,290	57.41
Democratic	Jim Brusatto	17,965	37.79
Libertarian	Chauna Pierce	2,282	4.8
Majority		9,325	19.62
Turnout		47,537	66.2
Republican win (new seat)			

=== District 3 ===
Salt Lake County Council 3rd district
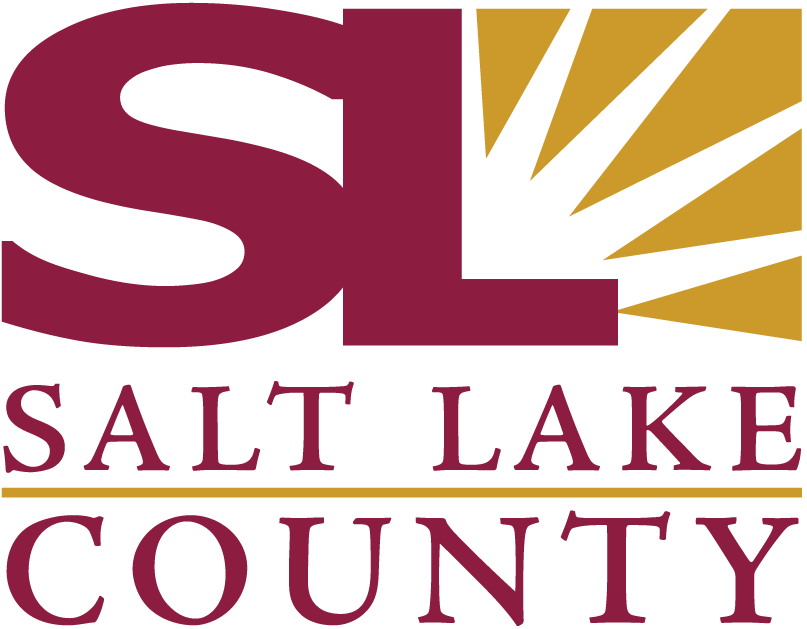
Nominee	David A. Wilde	Mark O. Walsh
Party	Republican	Democratic
Popular vote	20,893	19,231
Percentage	52.07%	47.93%
Elected Councilman
David A. Wilde
Republican

2000 Salt Lake County Council district 3
Party	Candidate	Votes	%
Republican	David A. Wilde	20,893	52.07
Democratic	Mark O. Walsh	19,231	47.93
Majority		1,662	4.14
Turnout		40,124	63.31
Republican win (new seat)			

=== District 4 ===
Salt Lake County Council 4th district
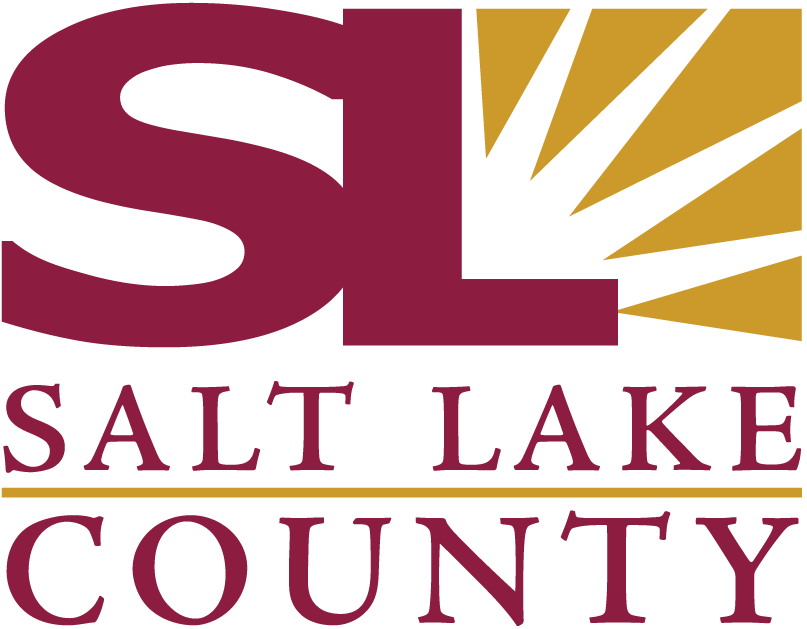
Nominee	Russell C. Skousen	Michael R. Duncan
Party	Republican	Democratic
Popular vote	26,461	26,371
Percentage	50.09%	49.91%
Elected Councilman
Russell C. Skousen
Republican

2000 Salt Lake County Council district 4
Party	Candidate	Votes	%
Republican	Russell C. Skousen	26,461	50.09
Democratic	Michael R. Duncan	26,371	49.91
Majority		90	0.18
Turnout		52,832	68.41
Republican win (new seat)			

=== District 5 ===
Salt Lake County Council 5th district
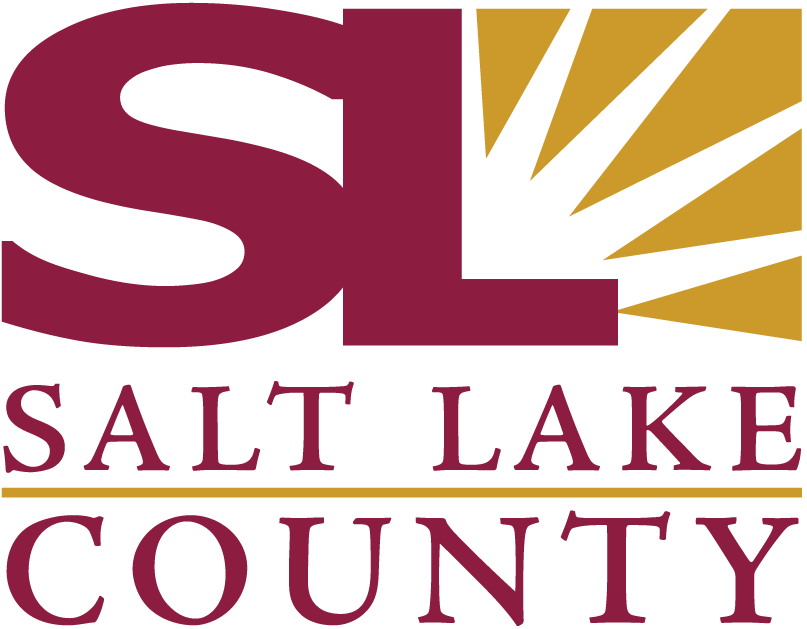
Nominee	Winston A. Wilkinson	Paulina F. Flint
Party	Republican	Democratic
Popular vote	32,059	18,583
Percentage	60.80%	35.24%
Elected Councilman
Winston A. Wilkinson
Republican

2000 Salt Lake County Council district 5
Party	Candidate	Votes	%
Republican	Winston A. Wilkinson	32,059	60.8
Democratic	Paulina F. Flint	18,583	35.24
Libertarian	Charles A. Bonsall	2,090	3.96
Majority		13476	25.56
Turnout		52,732	68.01
Republican win (new seat)			

=== District 6 ===
Salt Lake County Council 6th district
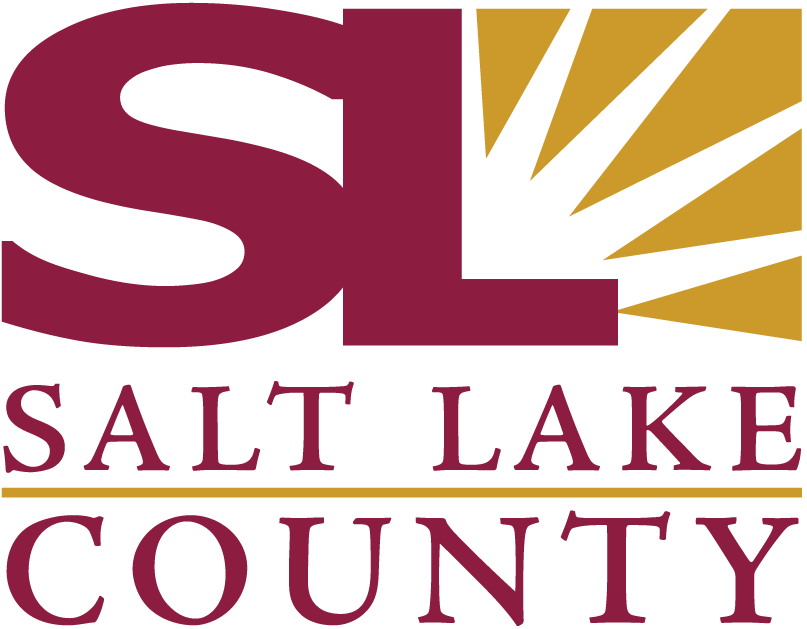
Nominee	Marvin L. Hendrickson	Pete Kutulas
Party	Republican	Democratic
Popular vote	29,046	24,581
Percentage	54.16%	45.84%
Elected Councilman
Marvin L. Hendrickson
Republican

==== Primary ====
A Democratic primary was held on June 27, 2000.

Democratic primary results
Party	Candidate	Votes	%
Democratic	Pete Kutulas	372	52.54
Democratic	J. Chris Cage	336	47.46
Total votes		708	100

==== General ====
2000 Salt Lake County Council district 6
Party	Candidate	Votes	%
Republican	Marvin L. Hendrickson	29,046	54.16
Democratic	Pete Kutulas	24,581	45.84
Majority		4,465	8.32
Turnout		53,627	67.63
Republican win (new seat)			
