= 2012 Salt Lake County mayoral election =

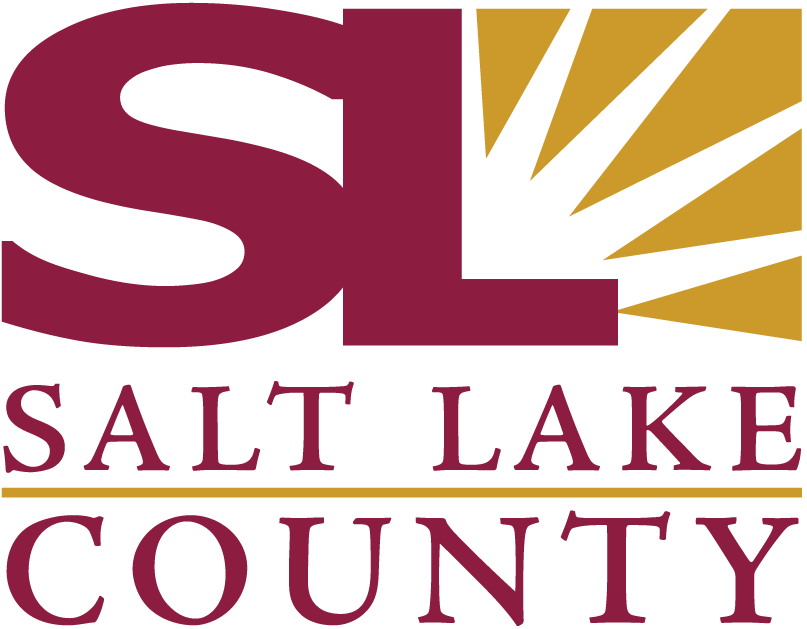
- November 6, 2012
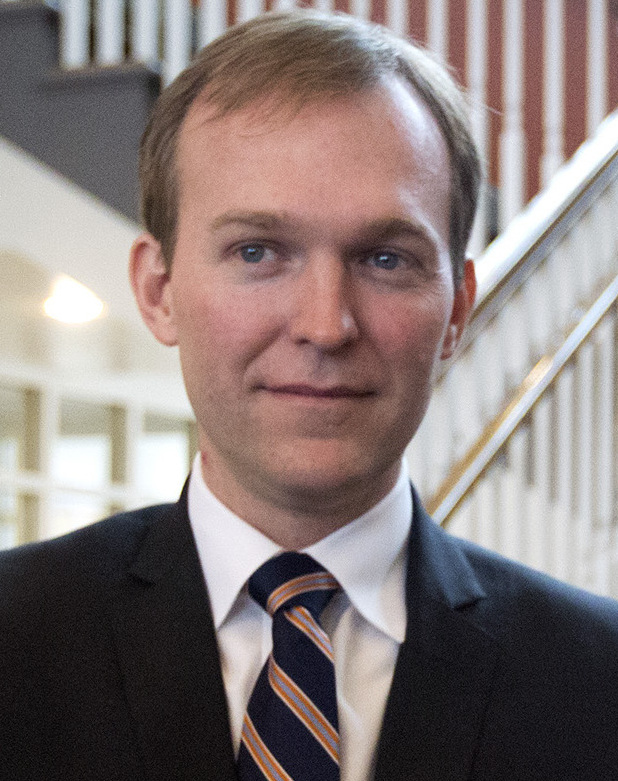

Candidate	Ben McAdams	Mark Crockett
Party	Democratic	Republican
Popular vote	203,170	169,418
Percentage	54.47%	45.42%
- Precinct results McAdams: 40–50% 50–60% 60–70% 70–80% 80–90% >90% Crockett: 50–60% 60–70% 70–80% 80–90% >90% Tie: 50% No votes
Mayor before election
Peter Corroon
Democratic
Elected mayor
Ben McAdams
Democratic

The 2012 Salt Lake County mayoral election was held to elect the Mayor of Salt Lake County, Utah on November 6, 2012, alongside the presidential, House of Representatives, Senate, and gubernatorial elections. This marked the fourth election to the office since the post was created in 2000.

Incumbent two-term Democratic County Mayor Peter Corroon honored his two-term pledge and did not run for a third term.

During the election, despite the county voting for Republicans Mitt Romney in the presidential election, Gary Herbert in the gubernatorial and Orrin Hatch in the Senate election, Democratic State Senator Ben McAdams managed to keep the mayor's office Democratic, defeating Republican candidate, former county councilman Mark Crockett.

== Candidates ==
=== Democratic Party ===
- Ross Romero, Utah Senate Minority Leader
- Ben McAdams, Utah Senate 2nd District Senator since 2009

In the first round of delegates, McAdams won 57.4% of the vote against Romero's 42.6%. Under the party constitution, a candidate would have to get 60% of delegates' vote to win the party's nomination, otherwise they would have to face their challenger in a primary election. However, due to a newly adopted rule, if a candidate received 57% of the vote, instead of a primary, the top two candidates would face off in a second round of balloting.

McAdams ran on working with Republicans, namely to allow Salt Lake City Mayor Ralph Becker pass an ordinance prohibiting workplace and housing discrimination against LGBT residents of the city. Romero preferred voters "being energized by Democrats and go to the polls to vote for Democrats".

McAdams defeated Romero in the second round, winning 62% of the vote against Romero's 38%.

=== Republican Party ===
==== Eliminated at convention ====
- Gary Ott, county recorder
- Richard Snelgrove, county councilman at-large, chairman of Salt Lake County GOP and Utah GOP
- Merrill Cook, Utah's 2nd congressional district representative 1997–2001, 2004 candidate
- Larry Decker, county auditor's office internal auditor

==== Advanced to runoff ====
- Mike Winder, Mayor of West Valley City, Utah
- Mark Crockett, former Salt Lake County councilman (2005–2008)

==== Republican runoff election ====
The runoff election was held on June 26, 2012.

Republican primary results
Party	Candidate	Votes	%
Republican	Mark Crockett	38,387	50.67
Republican	Mike Winder	37,368	49.33
Total votes		75,755	100.00

== General election ==
Debates were held on September 14, 2012, and September 26, 2012.

== Polling ==
Poll source	Date(s) administered	Sample size	Margin of error	Ben McAdams	Mark Crockett	Undecided
Deseret News/KSL	Sep. 26–29, 2012		± 5%	37%	40%	21%
Mason-Dixon Polling & Research Inc.	Oct. 22–28, 2012	625	± 4%	43%	44%	13%
Deseret News/KSL	Oct. 26 – November 1, 2012	523	± 4.3%	44%	41%	12%

== Results ==
2012 Salt Lake County mayoral general election results
Party	Candidate	Votes	%	±%
Democratic	Ben McAdams	203,170	54.47%	−11.31%
Republican	Mark Crockett	169,418	45.42%	+13.3%
Write-ins		389	0.10%	+0.04%
Total votes		372,977	100.00%	+4.77%
