= Sheryl Allen =

Republican politician and educator

Sheryl L. Allen
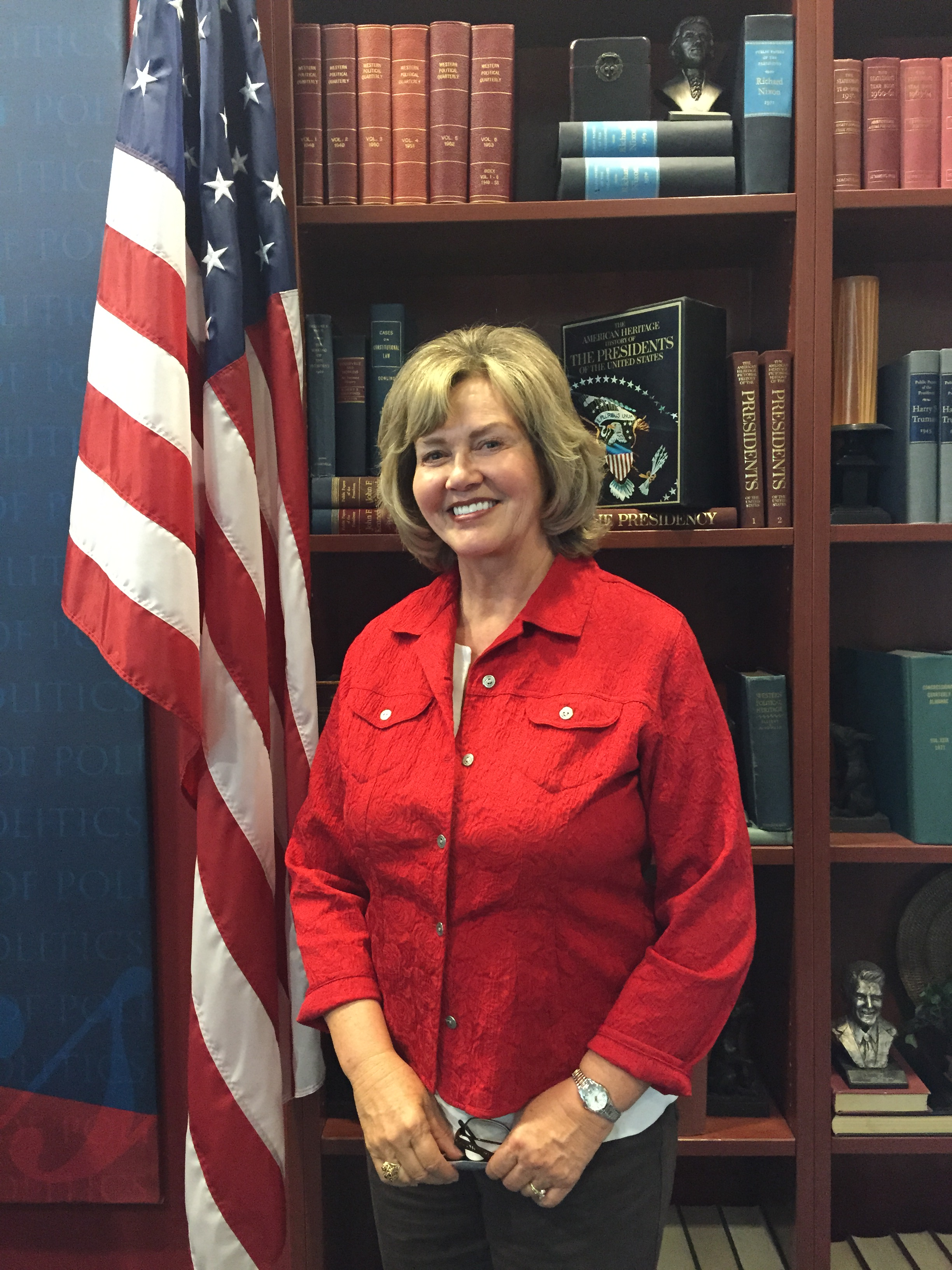
- Allen in 2015

Member of the Utah House of Representatives from the 19th district
- In office July 20, 1994 – January 24, 2011
- Preceded by: Kim Burningham
- Succeeded by: Jim Nielson

President of the Davis County Board of Education
- In office March 1982 – January 3, 1989
- Preceded by: Lucile Cardon Reading
- Succeeded by: Lynn Summerhays

Member of the Davis County Board of Education
- In office January 1, 1977 – January 3, 1989

Personal details
- Born: June 30, 1943 (age 83) Salt Lake City, Utah, USA
- Party: Republican
- Spouse: John Allen
- Children: 4
- Education: University of Utah
- Profession: Teacher, foundation director of the Davis School District
- Website: Utah House of Representatives

Sheryl L. Allen (born June 30, 1943) is a Republican politician and educator from Bountiful, Utah. She represented the 19th District of the Utah House of Representatives from 1994 to 2011. Before entering politics, Allen was a teacher and the president of the Davis County Board of Education.

In May 2010, Salt Lake County mayor Peter Corroon, the Democratic candidate for Governor of Utah, selected Allen as his running mate for the office of lieutenant governor, making them the first major bipartisan ticket in Utah state history. However, they were defeated by the all-Republican ticket of Gary Herbert and Greg Bell in the 2010 gubernatorial election.

== Background ==
Sheryl Allen was born in 1943 in Salt Lake City, Utah. Allen attended the University of Utah, where she received a Bachelor's degree in Elementary Education in 1965. She is married to John Allen, the chief statistician of the Utah Jazz. The Allens have four children and twelve grandchildren.

== Educational career ==
In 1976, Allen, Lucile Cardon Reading, and Theo Italisano were the first three women to be elected to the previously male-dominated Davis County Board of Education and took office on January 1, 1977. Reading, who became board president, and Allen worked to stop alleged mismanagement and ended the practice of officials receiving kickbacks from building contractors. Allen became board president with the death of Reading in March 1982. In 1988, Allen stated that she was stepping down from the board the following year to pursue graduate studies. In 1990, she received a Master's degree in Education Administration from the University of Utah.

It's not that we always agree, but on the big decisions you have got to be together.

— Sheryl Allen, Davis County Board of Education, December 1988

Allen was also the public relations director of the Davis Technical College (formerly known as the Davis Applied Technology Center) from 1985 to 1995. She became the foundation director of the Davis School District in 1995.

== Political career ==
Allen ran against Quinn Gardner in June 1994 to succeed Utah state representative Kim Burningham, who was stepping down after 15 years of service. Allen won with 54% of the vote and took office on July 20, 1994.

On January 26, 1996, eight hours after the execution by firing squad of John Albert Taylor, Allen introduced a bill to eliminate the firing squad, which did not pass. She later succeeded in passing HB180, which removed the right of the condemned to choose their method of execution after February 2004.

If they choose the firing squad, it's one last magnificent manipulation of the system to bring attention to themselves... It's time for Utah to do away with the firing squad.

— Sheryl Allen, Utah House of Representatives, January 21, 2004

In 2005, Allen was awarded Legislator of the Year by the Utah School Board Association. She was re-elected to her eighth term in the state legislature in 2008 with over 80% of the vote. Allen is a member of the House Judiciary Committee and the Revenue and Taxation Committee. She is also the co-chairperson of the Economic Development and Revenue Appropriations Subcommittee.

In 2008, Allen was involved in bringing forth an investigation by the Utah House Ethics Committee that led to the reprimand of fellow Republican house member Greg Hughes. Facing political ostracization from within her own party, Allen announced that she would not seek another term as a state representative in 2010.

=== 2010 campaign for Lieutenant Governor of Utah ===
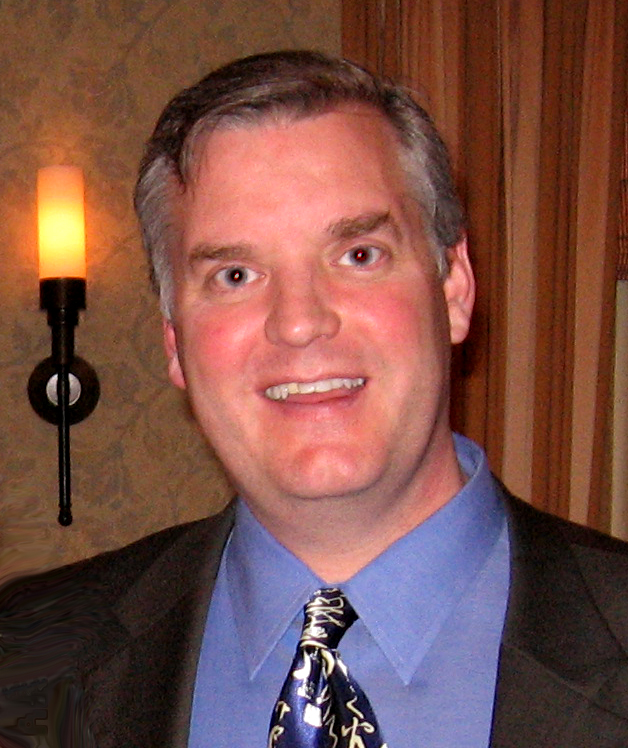
Peter Corroon

On May 1, 2010, Salt Lake County mayor Peter Corroon asked Allen to be his running mate for lieutenant governor in his gubernatorial bid against incumbent Republican Governor Gary Herbert. As Corroon ran as a Democrat and Allen as a Republican, this was the first bipartisan team on a single ticket between major political parties in a Utah state election. In 1976, governor Scott M. Matheson and lieutenant governor David Smith Monson were elected from different parties, but on separate tickets. Political clashes between Matheson and Monson led to changes in state election law, requiring joint tickets in subsequent elections.

Corroon and Allen ran on a moderate ticket to appeal to independent voters. A major platform of their campaign was the improvement of education in the state of Utah. Corroon's campaign accused Herbert's governorship of being "corrupt." After the second most expensive gubernatorial campaign in Utah history, Herbert won the election on November 2, 2010.

== Awards and honors ==
- Susa Young Gates Award, 1998
- Utah School Board Association Legislator of the Year, 2004
- Utah Hotel and Lodging Association Legislator of the Year, 2005
- Utah Medical Association Legislator of the Year, 2006

=== Affiliations ===
- 100 Women for 100 Years (1996 co-chair)
- Colorado Plateau Archeological Project (board member)
- Forum on Democracy and Trade (board member)
- George Washington University Elliott School of International Business (trade advisory committee)
- Hogle Zoo (former board member)
- KUED (PBS) (board member)
- NCSL Economic Development Committee (2004–06 chair)
- NCSL Standing Committee (2007 vice chair)
- Utah Humanities Council (former board member)

== See also ==
- 54th Utah State Legislature
