= Libertarian Party of Utah =

State affiliate of the Libertarian Party

- Chairperson: Barry Short
- Founded: 1971
- Membership (2026): 24,489
- Ideology: Libertarianism
- National affiliation: Libertarian Party
- Colors: Gold-yellow
- Statewide executive offices: 0 / 5
- Seats in the Utah Senate: 0 / 29
- Seats in the Utah House: 0 / 75
- UT seats in the U.S. Senate: 0 / 2
- UT seats in the U.S. House: 0 / 4
- Other elected officials: 0 (June 2024)

Website
- www.libertarianutah.org

The Libertarian Party of Utah is the Utah affiliate of the Libertarian Party. It was founded in 1971 under Chair Karl Bray, and was the first state affiliate of the national Libertarian party to achieve ballot access for its candidates (1976).

The State Chair is currently held by Barry Short, the Vice Chair is Tessa Stitzer. Taylor Smith serves as Treasurer and Susan Baird is the party Secretary.

The party, commonly abbreviated as UTLP, holds its biennial Organizing Convention in April of odd-numbered years, and Nominating Convention in April of even numbered years.

== Past and present office holders ==
- Mark B. Madsen – Utah Senate, District 13 (2004–2016; left the GOP and registered as a Libertarian on 25 July 2016)
- Willy Marshall – Mayor of Big Water, Utah (2001–2005)
- Alex Joseph – Mayor of Big Water, Utah (1986–1995)
- Apollo Pazell – Council member, Copperton
- Tessa Stitzer – Council member, Copperton

== Electoral performance ==
=== Presidential ===
Election year	Vote percentage	±%	Votes	Presidential candidate	Vice presidential candidate	Result	Reference
1976	0.5%	N/A	2,438	Roger MacBride	David Bergland	5th	
1980	1.2%	▲0.8	7,226	Ed Clark	David Koch	4th	
1984	0.4%	▼0.8	2,447	David Bergland	James A. Lewis	3rd	
1988	1.2%	▲0.8	7,473	Ron Paul	Andre Marrou	3rd	
1992	0.3%	▼0.9	1,900	Andre Marrou	Nancy Lord	5th	
1996	0.6%	▲0.4	4,129	Harry Browne	Jo Jorgensen	5th	
2000	0.5%	▼0.2	3,616	Harry Browne	Art Olivier	5th	
2004	0.4%	▼0.1	3,375	Michael Badnarik	Richard Campagna	5th	
2008	0.7%	▲0.4	6,966	Bob Barr	Wayne Allyn Root	5th	
2012	1.2%	▲0.5	12,572	Gary Johnson	Jim Gray	3rd	
2016	3.5%	▲2.3	39,608	Gary Johnson	Bill Weld	4th	
2020	2.6%	▼0.9	38,447	Jo Jorgensen	Spike Cohen	3rd	
2024	1.1%	▼1.5	16,902	Chase Oliver	Mike ter Maat	3rd	

=== Gubernatorial ===
Utah Libertarian Party gubernatorial election results
Election	Gubernatorial candidate	Votes	Vote %	Result
1988	Kitty K. Burton	1,661	0.3%	Lost ✗
1992	Did not field a candidate			
1996	Did not field a candidate			
2000	Did not field a candidate			
2004	Did not field a candidate			
2008	Dell Schanze	24,820	2.6%	Lost ✗
2010 (special)	W. Andrew McCullough	12,871	2.0%	Lost ✗
2012	Ken Larsen	22,611	2.3%	Lost ✗
2016	Brian Kamerath	34,827	3.1%	Lost ✗
2020	Daniel Cottam	51,393	3.5%	Lost ✗
2024	J.Robert Latham	41.164	2.79%	Lost ✗

== Notable people ==
- Mark Skousen
- Andrew McCullough
