= 2004 Salt Lake County mayoral election =

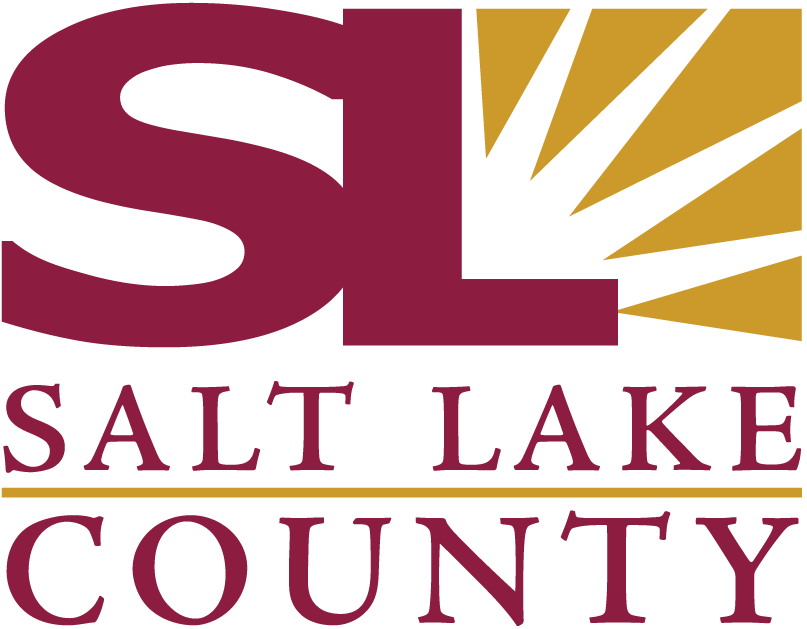
- November 2, 2004
- Turnout: 76.27%
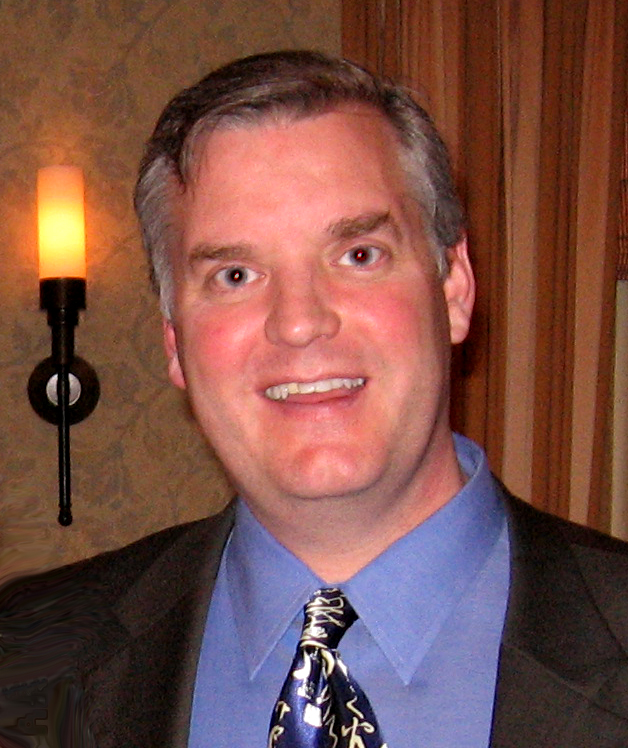

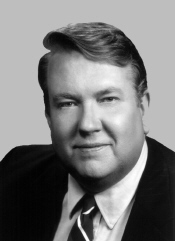
Nominee	Peter Corroon	Ellis Ivory	Merrill Cook
Party	Democratic	Republican	Independent
Popular vote	174,580	153,536	22,524
Percentage	49.50%	42.54%	6.39%
Mayor before election
Alan Dayton
Republican
Elected mayor
Peter Corroon
Democratic

The 2004 Salt Lake County mayoral election was held to elect the Mayor of Salt Lake County, Utah on November 2, 2004, alongside the presidential, House of Representatives, Senate and gubernatorial elections. This marked the second election to the office since the post was created in 2000.

In 2000, Nancy Workman was elected as the first county mayor. However, in June 2004, she came under investigation for hiring two county-paid employees who had worked for her daughter at the Boys and Girls Clubs of South Valley, resulting in her being placed on paid administrative leave on July 9, replaced with Deputy Mayor Alan Dayton.

Democrat Peter Corroon won the election as one of two Democrats to win the county during the election cycle, alongside gubernatorial candidate Scott Matheson Jr., while the county backed Republicans George W. Bush for president and Bob Bennett for Senator.

== Candidates ==
=== Democratic Party ===
- Peter Corroon, businessman

=== Republican Party ===
- Ellis Ivory, businessman

==== Dropped out ====
- Nancy Workman, former County Mayor (2001–2004)

Despite being placed on administrative leave, Workman still remained the Republican candidate and refused to withdraw. However, after revelations that she had paid her daughter's former boyfriend for county computer work that was never done, Salt Lake County GOP voted on October 5 to withdraw support for her, instead supporting Ivory, who until then was running as a write-in candidate. On October 12, Workman filed papers with County Clerk Sherrie Swensen to officially withdraw from the race, including a note from her physician, Philip Roberts, saying she was "disabled" and unable to continue. Swensen rejected the county GOP attempt to certify Ivory as their candidate, forcing the party to hold an emergency central committee meeting and succeeding a week before the election, despite lawsuits from Democratic Party.

=== Independent ===
- Merrill Cook, Utah's 2nd congressional district representative 1997–2001

=== Personal Choice ===
- F. Joseph Irish

== Polling ==
Poll source	Date(s) administered	Sample size	Margin of error	Peter Corroon	Ellis Ivory	Nancy Workman	Merrill Cook
Deseret News/KSL	October 7, 2004	306	±5.5%	34%	32%	10%	6%

== Results ==
2004 Salt Lake County mayoral general election results
Party	Candidate	Votes	%	±%
Democratic	Peter Corroon	174,580	49.50%	+1.94%
Republican	Ellis Ivory	150,015	42.54%	−9.9%
Write-ins	Ellis Ivory	3,521		
Independent	Merrill Cook	22,524	6.39%	
Personal Choice	F. Joseph Irish	4,020	1.14%	
Total votes		366,706	100.00%	+17.5%
