= 2008 Salt Lake County mayoral election =

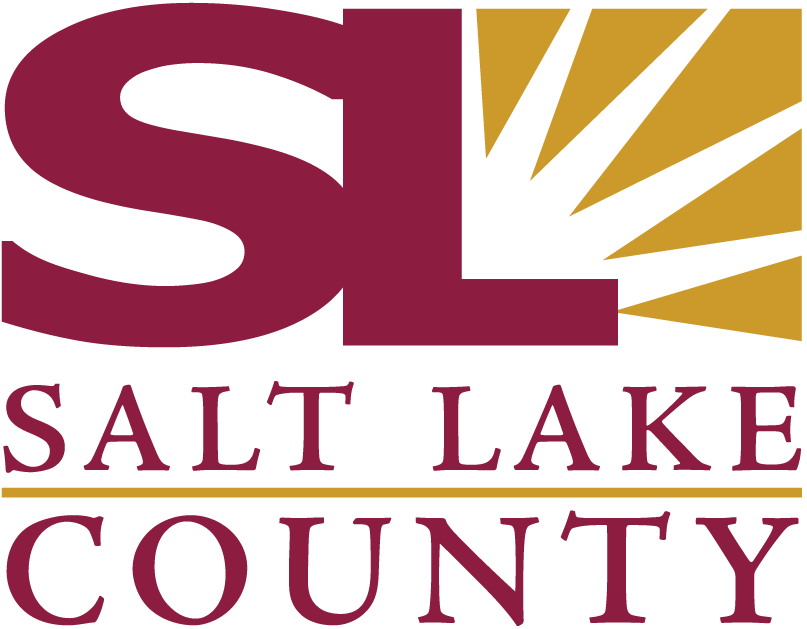
- November 4, 2008
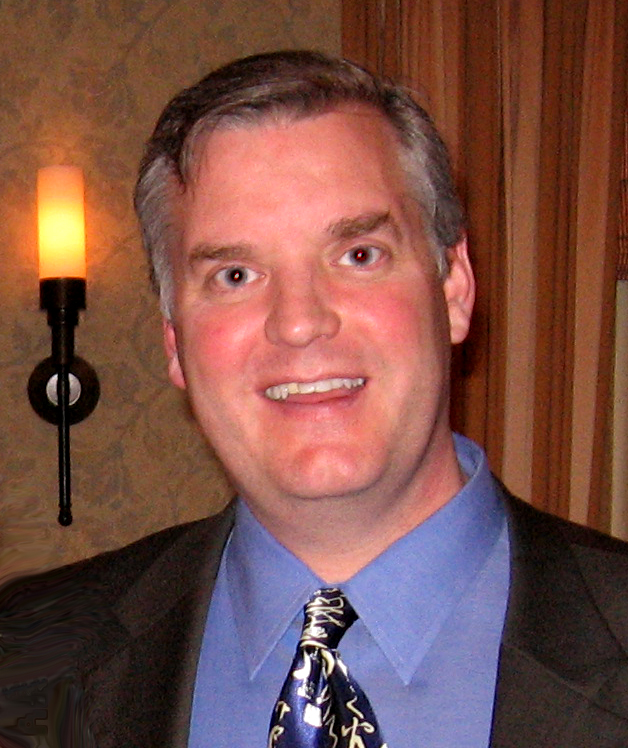

Candidate	Peter Corroon	Michael Renckert
Party	Democratic	Republican
Popular vote	233,655	114,097
Percentage	65.78%	32.12%
Mayor before election
Peter Corroon
Democratic
Elected mayor
Peter Corroon
Democratic

The 2008 Salt Lake County mayoral election was held to elect the Mayor of Salt Lake County, Utah on November 4, 2008, alongside the presidential, House of Representatives and gubernatorial elections. This marked the third election to the office since the post was created in 2000.

Popular incumbent Democrat Peter Corroon was elected in a nearly 2 to 1 landslide against token Republican opposition. In the same election cycle, Salt Lake County narrowly voted for Democrat Barack Obama for president, but also voted for incumbent Republican Governor Jon Huntsman Jr.

== Candidates ==
=== Democratic Party ===
- Peter Corroon, incumbent county mayor

=== Republican Party ===
- Michael Renckert, field supervisor for Adult Probation and Parole at the Utah Department of Corrections

==== Dropped out ====
- Dell Schanze, businessman (switched to gubernatorial election, running as Libertarian)

=== Constitution Party ===
- Leonard Olds

== Polling ==
Poll source	Date(s) administered	Sample size	Margin of error	Peter Corroon	Michael Renckert	Undecided
Deseret News/KSL	Oct. 24–30, 2008	498	± 4.5%	68%	22%	10%

== Results ==
2008 Salt Lake County mayoral general election results
Party	Candidate	Votes	%	±%
Democratic	Peter Corroon (incumbent)	233,655	65.78%	+16.28%
Republican	Michael Renckert	114,097	32.12%	−10.42%
Constitution	Leonard Olds	7,247	2.04%	
Write-ins		203	0.06%	
Total votes		355,202	100.00%	-3.14%
