= Peter Cooke (politician) =

American politician and businessman (born 1949)

Personal details
- Born: Peter Stryker Cooke; March 7, 1949 (age 77) Miami, Florida, US
- Party: Democratic
- Spouse: Heather Nelson
- Children: 5
- Education: Utah State University, Logan (BA, MA); United States Army War College

Military service
- Allegiance: United States
- Branch/service: United States Army
- Rank: Major General

Peter Stryker Cooke (born March 7, 1949) is an American businessman, politician and retired Army Reservist. In 2012, he was the Democratic nominee for Governor of Utah.

== Early life ==
Cooke was born in Miami, Florida. Cooke's father was a pilot for Pan American Airlines and his family traveled frequently. Cooke graduated from Frankfurt American High School in 1967. Cooke moved to Utah from Germany to enroll in the Utah State University (USU) forestry program. However, he ultimately earned a bachelor's degree in 1971 and a master's degree in 1973 from USU in political science. During his time at USU, Cooke was a member of the Army Reserve Officer Training Corps (ROTC).

== Career ==
After graduating from USU, Cooke served in the United States Army Reserves. In 2009 he was awarded the Army Community of Excellence Award. After 39 years in the military, he retired with the rank of major general. He served as commander of the 96th (reserve) Regional Readiness Command before his retirement.

Cooke ran for a congressional bid in 1978, but was not elected. Under Governor Scott M. Matheson, Cooke served as the director of economic development for Utah. In 2012, Cooke declared his candidacy for Governor of Utah.

Cooke served as president of the Washington DC North Mission of the Church of Jesus Christ of Latter-day Saints for three years starting in June 2013.

== Personal life ==
Cooke is the father of five children: Sara, Howard, Carolyn, Joseph, and Elizabeth. His wife, Heather, has worked as a lawyer.

In the 2024 United States presidential election, Cooke endorsed Kamala Harris.

Party political offices
Preceded by Peter Corroon	Democratic nominee for Governor of Utah; 2012	Succeeded by Mike Weinholtz
