= Salt Lake County Council =

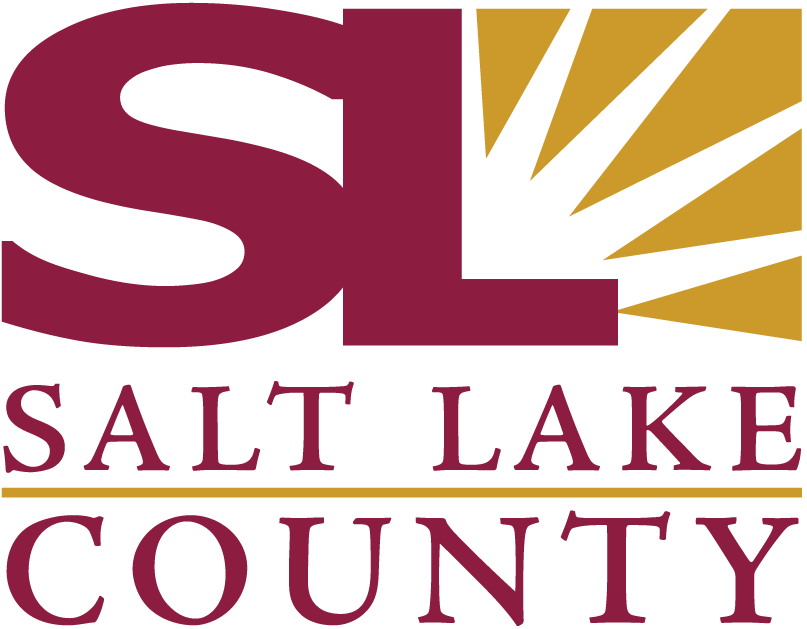

Type
- Type: Unicameral legislature of the county government

Leadership
- Chair: Aimee Winder Newton, Republican Party since 2026

Structure
- Seats: 9
- Political groups: Republican (5)
- Political groups: Democratic (4)

Elections
- Last election: November 5, 2024

Meeting place
- Salt Lake County Government Center; North Building; 2001 South State Street; Salt Lake City, Utah 84114

The Salt Lake County Council is the legislative body of the home rule government of Salt Lake County, Utah. The council consists of nine members, each representing one of the nine districts from which they were elected.

== History ==
Like most counties in Utah, Salt Lake County was governed by a three-member commission before county voters approved the change to a nine-member council with an elected mayor in 1998 general election. It took effect in 2000, when the first councilors were elected.

== Elections ==
The county council elections are partisan and held alongside general elections in the presidential and midterm election years. The council members are elected in staggered terms, every two years, one at-large and three district members are elected. The members in odd-numbered districts are elected in midterm election years and the members in even-numbered districts are elected in presidential election years.

== Composition ==
The council members are elected from nine districts: three alphabetical districts are at large and are elected to six-year terms, while six numerical districts are sectioned into separate districts and elected to four-year terms.

=== At-large ===
The three current at-large council members are Laurie Stringham (Republican), first elected in 2020; Suzanne Harrison (Democratic), first elected in 2022; and Natalie Pinkney (Democratic), first elected in 2024.

=== District 1 ===
District 1 consists of most of Salt Lake City, almost all of South Salt Lake and the northeastern corner of West Valley City. Its current councilmember is Democrat Jiro Johnson.

=== District 2 ===
District 2 consists of West Valley City and South Jordan west of Bangerter Highway, a small piece of West Jordan, small pieces of Riverton and Herriman and the unincorporated communities of Kearns and Magna. Its current councilmember is Republican Carlos Moreno.

=== District 3 ===
District 3 consists of Taylorsville in its entirety, most of Murray and parts of West Valley City, South Salt Lake, Millcreek and West Jordan. Its current councilmember is Republican Aimee Winder Newton.

=== District 4 ===
District 4 encompasses the entire city of Holladay, the far eastern part of Salt Lake City, most of Millcreek and parts of Murray and Cottonwood Heights. Its current councilmember is Democrat Ross Romero.

=== District 5 ===
District 5 encompasses the entire city of Bluffdale, most of West Jordan, Riverton and Herriman, South Jordan east of Bangerter Highway, Draper west of I-15, and small slivers of West Valley City, Midvale and Sandy. Its current councilmember is Republican Sheldon Stewart.

=== District 6 ===
District 6 encompasses a majority of Draper, Sandy and Midvale and part of Cottonwood Heights. Its current councilmember is Republican Dea Theodore.

== Councilmember history ==
Elected councilmembers
Election	At-large A	At-large B	At-large C	District 1	District 2	District 3	District 4	District 5	District 6
2000	Randy Horiuchi (D)	Steve Harmsen (R)	Jim Bradley (D)	Joe Hatch (D)	Michael Jensen (R)	David Wilde (R)	Russell Skousen (R)	Winston Wilkinson (R)	Marvin Hendrickson (R)
2002	Randy Horiuchi (D)	Steve Harmsen (R)	Jim Bradley (D)	Joe Hatch (D)	Michael Jensen (R)	David Wilde (R)	Russell Skousen (R)	Cortlund Ashton (R)	Marvin Hendrickson (R)
2004	Randy Horiuchi (D)	Jenny Wilson (D)	Jim Bradley (D)	Joe Hatch (D)	Michael Jensen (R)	David Wilde (R)	Mark Crockett (R)	Cortlund Ashton (R)	Marvin Hendrickson (R)
2006	Randy Horiuchi (D)	Jenny Wilson (D)	Jim Bradley (D)	Joe Hatch (D)	Michael Jensen (R)	David Wilde (R)	Mark Crockett (R)	Jeff Allen (R)	Marvin Hendrickson (R)
2008	Randy Horiuchi (D)	Jenny Wilson (D)	Jim Bradley (D)	Joe Hatch (D)	Michael Jensen (R)	David Wilde (R)	Jani Iwamoto (D)	Jeff Allen (R)	Max Burdick (R)
2010	Randy Horiuchi (D)	Richard Snelgrove (R)	Jim Bradley (D)	Arlyn Bradshaw (D)	Michael Jensen (R)	David Wilde (R)	Jani Iwamoto (D)	Steven DeBry (R)	Max Burdick (R)
2012	Randy Horiuchi (D)	Richard Snelgrove (R)	Jim Bradley (D)	Arlyn Bradshaw (D)	Michael Jensen (R)	David Wilde (R)	Sam Granato (D)	Steven DeBry (R)	Max Burdick (R)
2014	Jenny Wilson (D)	Richard Snelgrove (R)	Jim Bradley (D)	Arlyn Bradshaw (D)	Michael Jensen (R)	Aimee Winder Newton (R)	Sam Granato (D)	Steven DeBry (R)	Max Burdick (R)
2016	Jenny Wilson (D)	Richard Snelgrove (R)	Jim Bradley (D)	Arlyn Bradshaw (D)	Michael Jensen (R)	Aimee Winder Newton (R)	Sam Granato (D)	Steven DeBry (R)	Max Burdick (R)
2018	Jenny Wilson (D)	Richard Snelgrove (R)	Jim Bradley (D)	Arlyn Bradshaw (D)	Michael Jensen (R)	Aimee Winder Newton (R)	Ann Granato (D) (Note: Won special election to succeed her husband Sam Granato after his death.)	Steven DeBry (R)	Max Burdick (R)
2019	Shireen Ghorbani (D) (Note: Appointed to succeed Jenny Wilson, who was appointed to Mayor of Salt Lake County.)	Richard Snelgrove (R)	Jim Bradley (D)	Arlyn Bradshaw (D)	Michael Jensen (R)	Aimee Winder Newton (R)	Ann Granato (D)	Steven DeBry (R)	Max Burdick (R)
2020	Laurie Stringham (R)	Richard Snelgrove (R)	Jim Bradley (D)	Arlyn Bradshaw (D)	David Alvord (R)	Aimee Winder Newton (R)	Ann Granato (D)	Steven DeBry (R)	Dea Theodore (R)
2022	Laurie Stringham (R)	Suzanne Harrison (D)	Jim Bradley (D)	Arlyn Bradshaw (D)	David Alvord (R)	Aimee Winder Newton (R)	Ann Granato (D)	Sheldon Stewart (R)	Dea Theodore (R)
2024	Laurie Stringham (R)	Suzanne Harrison (D)	Natalie Pinkney (D)	Arlyn Bradshaw (D)	Carlos Moreno (R)	Aimee Winder Newton (R)	Ross Romero (D)	Sheldon Stewart (R)	Dea Theodore (R)
2025	Laurie Stringham (R)	Suzanne Harrison (D)	Natalie Pinkney (D)	Jiro Johnson (D) (Note: Appointed to succeed Arlyn Bradshaw, who resigned to join Mayor Wilson's Administration.)	Carlos Moreno (R)	Aimee Winder Newton (R)	Ross Romero (D)	Sheldon Stewart (R)	Dea Theodore (R)
