= Suzanne Harrison =

American medical doctor and politician

Member of the Salt Lake County Council
- Incumbent
- Assumed office January 2023

Member of the Utah House of Representatives from the 32nd district
- In office January 1, 2019 – December 31, 2022
- Preceded by: LaVar Christensen
- Succeeded by: Sahara Hayes

Personal details
- Born: Provo, Utah, U.S.
- Party: Democratic
- Children: 3
- Education: Stanford University (BS); University of Utah (MD)

Suzanne Harrison is an American politician and physician who served as a member of the Utah House of Representatives for the 32nd district from 2019 to 2022. She was elected to the Salt Lake County Council in November 2022 and assumed office in January 2023.

== Early life and education ==
Harrison was born in Provo, Utah. She earned a Bachelor of Science degree in human biology from Stanford University in 1997 and a Doctor of Medicine from the University of Utah School of Medicine in 2007. She completed a residency program in anesthesiology and critical care at Harvard Medical School.

== Career ==
Harrison works at Riverton Hospital and Intermountain Medical Center. She first ran for the Utah House of Representatives in 2016, losing to Republican incumbent LaVar Christensen by only three votes. Harrison ran against Republican Brad Bonham in 2018 and won with 56.3% of the vote. In 2020, Harrison ran for her second term and won with 55.1% of the vote over Republican challenger Cindie Quintana.

In 2022, after redistricting, Harrison ran for a seat on the Salt Lake County Council. She defeated incumbent Richard Snelgrove by 10 points.

== Political positions ==
=== Environment and energy policy ===
Harrison supports policies intended to limit pollution. She is a co-chair of the Bipartisan Clean-Air Caucus.

Harrison opposed then-EPA Administrator Andrew R. Wheeler's policies of cutting regulations on clean air standards. Harrison supported Governor Spencer Cox's proposal to spend $50 million on electric car infrastructure.

=== Public lands ===
In 2021, Harrison criticized Senator Mike Lee's proposal to exempt Utah from the Antiquities Act, saying that "many of the places that need protection in our state could become even more vulnerable." She also criticizes Lee for "us(ing) his platform to make deceptive statements about public lands, including that monument designations do not make a place more beautiful or create community opportunities... clearly, they do."

=== Redistricting ===
Rep. Harrison supports legislative districts to be drawn by an independent commission, rather than by the legislature.
