= Available Jones =

Available Jones may refer to:

- Available Jones, a character in the comic strip Li'l Abner
- Sheldon Jones or Available Jones (1922–1991), American baseball player
