= 2000 Salt Lake County mayoral election =

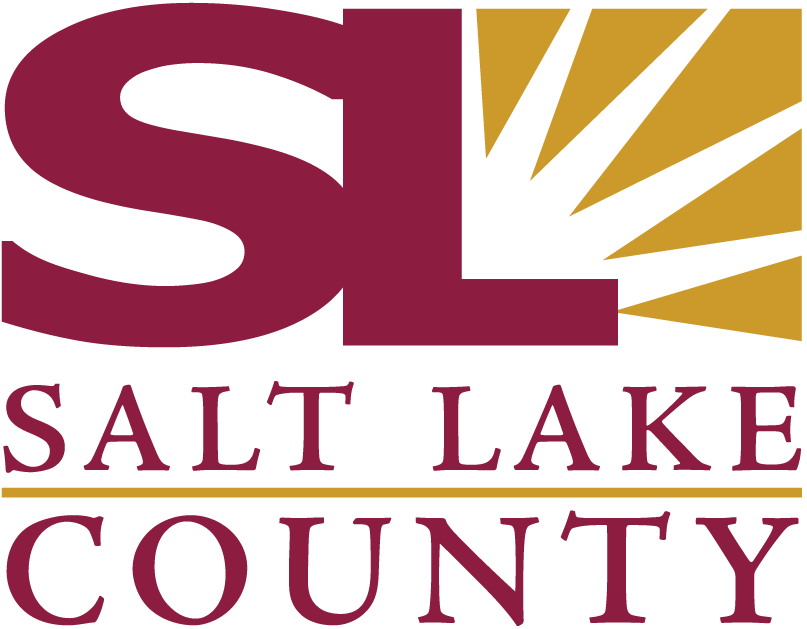
- November 7, 2000
| Candidate | Nancy Workman | Karen Crompton |
| Party | Republican | Democratic |
| Popular vote | 158,787 | 144,011 |
| Percentage | 52.44% | 47.56% |
Mayor before election
Office established
Elected mayor
Nancy Workman
Republican

The 2000 Salt Lake County mayoral election was the first election held to elect the first Mayor of Salt Lake County, Utah on November 7, 2000, alongside the presidential, House of Representatives, Senate and gubernatorial elections.

Utah Code (Title 17, Chapter 52a, Part 2) allows counties in the state to choose one of four forms of county government:

- Standard three-member full-time commission,
- Expanded five- or seven-member full-time commission,
- Three-, five-, seven- or nine-member part-time council with a full-time appointed manager,
- or a three-, five-, seven- or nine-member part-time council with a full-time elected mayor.

Like most other counties in Utah, Salt Lake County used to be governed by a three-member county commission. However, in 1998, county voters approved the change in form of government to a nine-member council with an elected mayor, that was to take effect in 2001, following 2000 elections.

Republican county Recorder Nancy Workman won the election, alongside presidential candidate George W. Bush and Senator Orrin Hatch. The only Democrat to win the county during the election cycle was gubernatorial candidate Bill Orton.

== Candidates ==
=== Democratic Party ===
- Karen Crompton, 1998 candidate for county commission

=== Republican Party ===
- Nancy Workman, county recorder

==== Dropped out ====
- Brent Overson, county commissioner

== Results ==
2000 Salt Lake County mayoral general election results
| Party | Candidate | Votes | % | ±% |
|---|---|---|---|---|
| Republican | Nancy Workman | 158,787 | 52.44% | |
| Democratic | Karen Crompton | 144,011 | 47.56% | |
| Total votes | | 312,098 | 100.00% | |
