= 2010 Utah gubernatorial special election =

- November 2, 2010
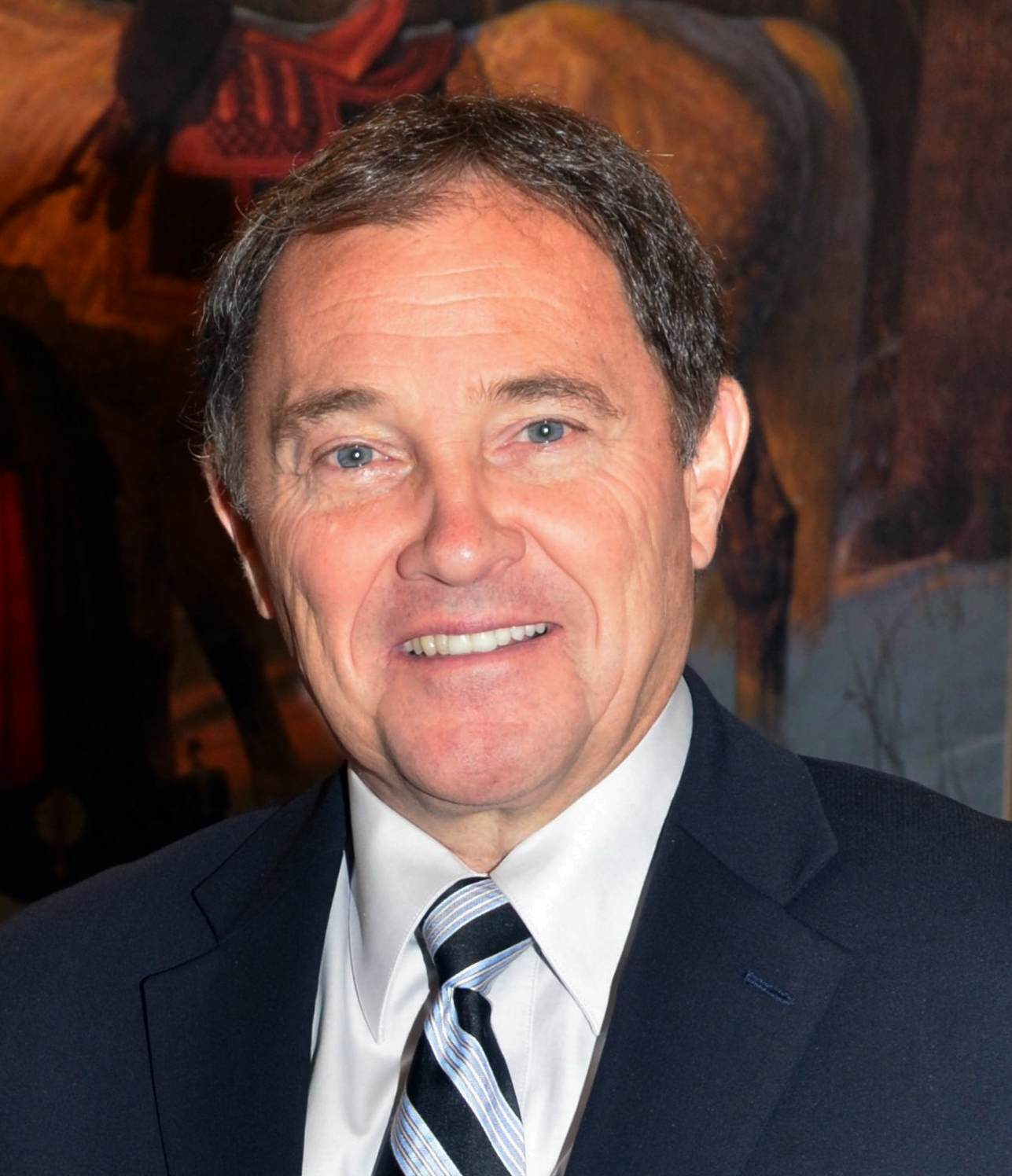

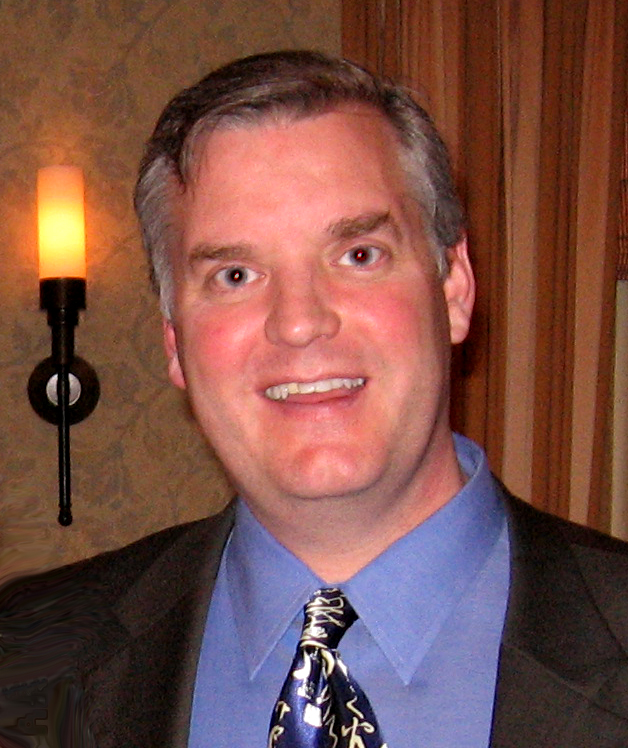
Nominee	Gary Herbert	Peter Corroon
Party	Republican	Democratic
Running mate	Greg Bell	Sheryl Allen
Popular vote	412,151	205,246
Percentage	64.07%	31.90%
- County results Herbert: 40–50% 50–60% 60–70% 70–80% 80–90% Corroon: 50–60%
Governor before election
Gary Herbert
Republican
Elected Governor
Gary Herbert
Republican

The 2010 Utah gubernatorial special election took place November 2, 2010. It was a special election to fill the remainder of Governor Jon Huntsman's term. Huntsman resigned on August 11, 2009, to become United States Ambassador to China. Lieutenant Governor Gary Herbert assumed the governorship and went on to defeat his Democratic opponent, Salt Lake County Mayor Peter Corroon, in the 2010 election.

== Candidates ==
=== Democratic ===
- Peter Corroon, Mayor of Salt Lake County

=== Republican ===
==== Nominee ====
- Gary Herbert, Governor

==== Defeated at convention ====
- Richard Martin
- Daniel Van Oaks, Jr.

State Republican Convention results (first round)
Party	Candidate	Votes	%
Republican	Gary R. Herbert (incumbent)	2,386	70.8%
Republican	Daniel Van Oaks, Jr.	830	24.6%
Republican	Richard Martin	141	4.2%

=== Libertarian ===
- W Andrew McCullough

=== Other ===
- Farley Anderson

== General election ==
=== Predictions ===
Source	Ranking	As of
Cook Political Report	Safe R	October 14, 2010
Rothenberg	Safe R	October 28, 2010
RealClearPolitics	Safe R	November 1, 2010
Sabato's Crystal Ball	Safe R	October 28, 2010
CQ Politics	Safe R	October 28, 2010

=== Polling ===
Poll source	Dates administered	Gary Herbert (R)	Peter Corroon (D)
Rasmussen Reports	October 13, 2010	66%	29%
Dan Jones & Associates	September 7–13, 2010	52%	31%
Rasmussen Reports	August 23, 2010	60%	29%
Rasmussen Reports	June 23, 2010	58%	31%
Rasmussen Reports	April 8, 2010	57%	29%
Mason-Dixon	January 18–20, 2010	55%	30%
Dan Jones & Associates	January 12–13, 2010	48%	35%
Dan Jones & Associates	November 19–23, 2009	56%	32%

=== Results ===

2010 Utah special gubernatorial election
Party	Candidate	Votes	%	±%
Republican	Gary Herbert (incumbent)	412,151	64.07%	−13.56%
Democratic	Peter Corroon	205,246	31.90%	+12.18%
Independent	Farley Anderson	13,038	2.03%	+2.03%
Libertarian	W. Andrew McCullough	12,871	2.00%	−0.62%
Write-in	Michael William Heath	1	0.00%	
Total votes		643,307	100.00%	
Majority		206,905	32.16%	
Republican hold		Swing	-25.75%	

=== Results by county ===
County	Gary Herbert Republican		Peter Corroon Democratic		Farley Anderson Independent		W. Andrew McCullough Libertarian		Margin		Total votes cast
County	#	%	#	%	#	%	#	%	#	%	Total votes cast
Beaver	1,640	73.97%	482	21.74%	34	1.53%	61	2.75%	1,158	52.23%	2,217
Box Elder	9,940	77.90%	2,240	17.55%	313	2.45%	267	2.09%	7,700	60.34%	12,760
Cache	17,081	69.60%	5,906	24.07%	1,071	4.36%	482	1.96%	11,175	45.54%	24,540
Carbon	2,929	55.11%	2,149	40.43%	119	2.24%	118	2.22%	780	14.68%	5,315
Daggett	339	69.04%	129	26.27%	14	2.85%	9	1.83%	210	42.77%	491
Davis	49,800	71.23%	17,529	25.07%	1,268	1.81%	1,320	1.89%	32,271	46.16%	69,917
Duchesne	3,780	81.43%	675	14.54%	96	2.07%	91	1.96%	3,105	66.89%	4,642
Emery	2,862	75.53%	777	20.51%	70	1.85%	80	2.11%	2,085	55.03%	3,789
Garfield	1,292	78.02%	309	18.66%	20	1.21%	35	2.11%	983	59.36%	1,656
Grand	1,638	49.03%	1,532	45.85%	53	1.59%	118	3.53%	106	3.17%	3,341
Iron	8,148	74.83%	1,949	17.90%	479	4.40%	312	2.87%	6,199	56.93%	10,888
Juab	2,091	73.70%	593	20.90%	99	3.49%	54	1.90%	1,498	52.80%	2,837
Kane	1,772	72.83%	534	21.95%	79	3.25%	48	1.97%	1,238	50.88%	2,433
Millard	3,121	74.90%	724	17.37%	239	5.74%	83	1.99%	2,397	57.52%	4,167
Morgan	2,432	76.89%	591	18.68%	81	2.56%	59	1.87%	1,841	58.20%	3,163
Piute	460	80.56%	84	14.71%	17	2.98%	10	1.75%	376	65.85%	571
Rich	609	78.18%	152	19.51%	9	1.16%	9	1.16%	457	58.66%	779
Salt Lake	129,024	51.02%	115,319	45.60%	3,467	1.37%	5,074	2.01%	13,705	5.42%	252,884
San Juan	2,349	57.32%	1,576	38.46%	99	2.42%	74	1.81%	773	18.86%	4,098
Sanpete	4,555	75.40%	1,100	18.21%	267	4.42%	119	1.97%	3,455	57.19%	6,041
Sevier	4,779	79.70%	966	16.11%	150	2.50%	101	1.68%	3,813	63.59%	5,996
Summit	5,050	44.10%	6,051	52.84%	122	1.07%	229	2.00%	-1,001	-8.74%	11,452
Tooele	7,965	66.60%	3,469	29.01%	247	2.07%	279	2.33%	4,496	37.59%	11,960
Uintah	6,068	82.01%	980	13.25%	202	2.73%	149	2.01%	5,088	68.77%	7,399
Utah	82,205	80.80%	15,372	15.11%	2,253	2.21%	1,909	1.88%	66,833	65.69%	101,740 (Note: Includes 1 write-in vote)
Wasatch	4,165	67.23%	1,808	29.18%	117	1.89%	105	1.69%	2,357	38.05%	6,195
Washington	26,668	75.34%	6,961	19.67%	930	2.63%	838	2.37%	19,707	55.67%	35,397
Wayne	848	74.52%	256	22.50%	16	1.41%	18	1.58%	592	52.02%	1,138
Weber	28,541	62.73%	15,033	33.04%	1,107	2.43%	820	1.80%	13,508	29.69%	45,501
Total	412,151	64.07%	205,246	31.90%	13,038	2.03%	12,871	2.00%	206,905	32.16%	643,307

==== Counties that flipped from Republican to Democratic ====
- Summit (largest municipality: Park City)

== See also ==
- 2010 United States gubernatorial elections
