= 2016 Salt Lake County mayoral election =

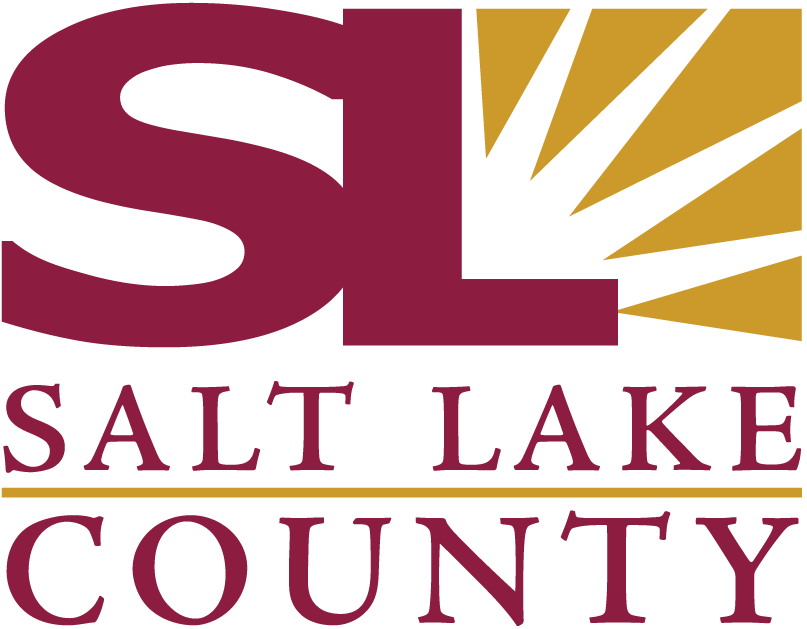
- November 8, 2016
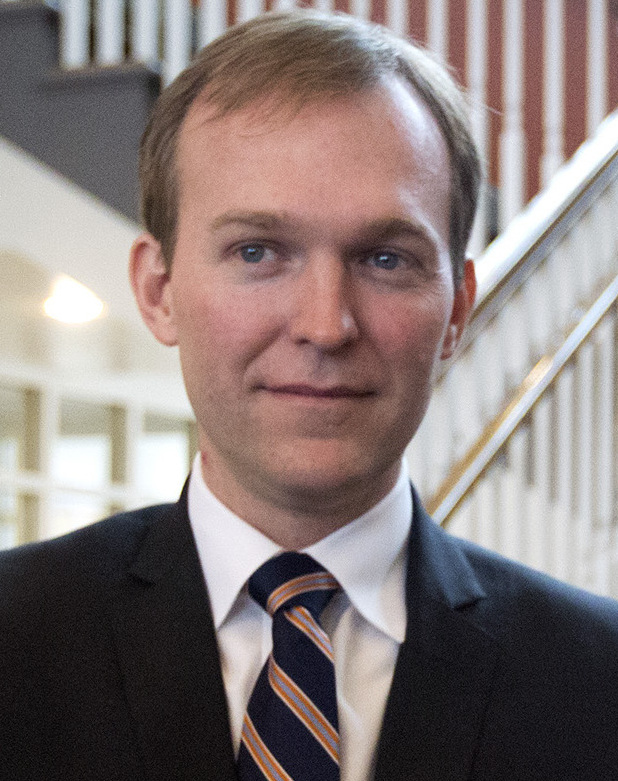

Candidate	Ben McAdams	David Robinson
Party	Democratic	Republican
Popular vote	238,927	163,558
Percentage	59.36%	40.64%
- Precinct results McAdams: 50–60% 60–70% 70–80% 80–90% >90% Robinson: 50–60% 60–70% 70–80% 80–90% >90% Tie: 50% No votes
Mayor before election
Ben McAdams
Democratic
Elected mayor
Ben McAdams
Democratic

The 2016 Salt Lake County mayoral election was held to elect the Mayor of Salt Lake County, Utah on November 8, 2016, alongside the presidential, House of Representatives, Senate and gubernatorial elections. This marked the fifth election to the office since the post was created in 2000.

Incumbent Democratic County Mayor Ben McAdams ran and won re-election to a second term against Republican candidate David Robinson.

== Candidates ==
=== Democratic Party ===
- Ben McAdams, incumbent county mayor

=== Republican Party ===
- David Robinson, business consultant

== Polling ==
Poll source	Date(s) administered	Sample size	Margin of error	Ben McAdams	David Robinson	Undecided
Salt Lake Tribune-Hinckley Institute of Politics	Oct. 20–27, 2016	339	± 5.32%	57%	31%	13%

== Results ==
2016 Salt Lake County mayoral general election results
Party	Candidate	Votes	%	±%
Democratic	Ben McAdams (incumbent)	238,927	59.36%	+4.89%
Republican	David Robinson	163,558	40.64%	−4.78%
Total votes		402,485	100.00%	+7.91%
