= Gary Herbert =

Governor of Utah from 2009 to 2021

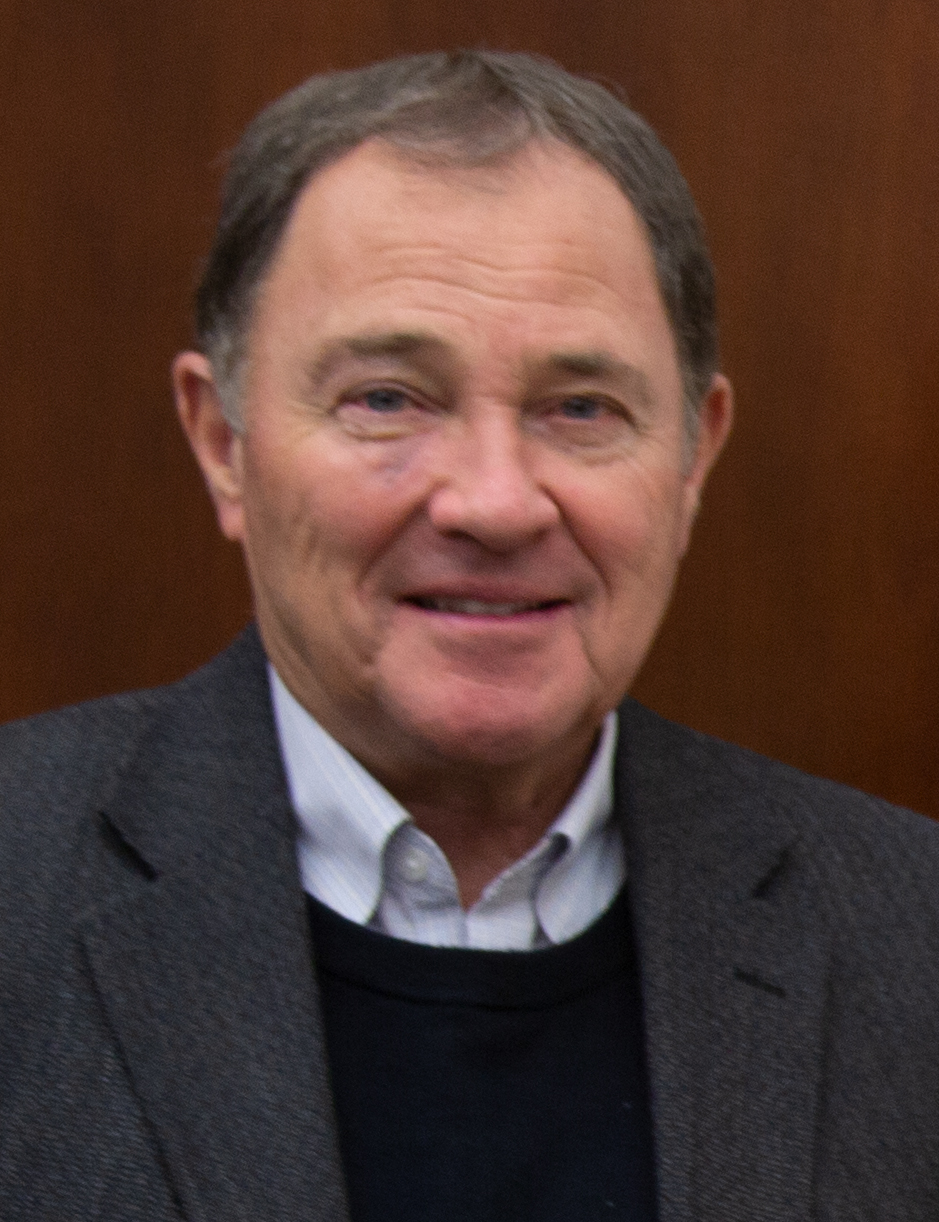
- Herbert in 2019

17th Governor of Utah
- In office August 11, 2009 – January 4, 2021
- Lieutenant: Greg Bell; Spencer Cox
- Preceded by: Jon Huntsman Jr.
- Succeeded by: Spencer Cox

Chair of the National Governors Association
- In office July 25, 2015 – July 17, 2016
- Preceded by: John Hickenlooper
- Succeeded by: Terry McAuliffe

6th Lieutenant Governor of Utah
- In office January 3, 2005 – August 11, 2009
- Governor: Jon Huntsman Jr.
- Preceded by: Gayle McKeachnie
- Succeeded by: Greg Bell

Member of the Utah County Commission
- In office 1990–2004
- Preceded by: Brent Morris
- Succeeded by: Larry Ellertson

Personal details
- Born: Gary Richard Peters; May 7, 1947 (age 79) American Fork, Utah, U.S.
- Party: Republican
- Spouse: Jeanette Snelson
- Children: 6
- Education: Brigham Young University (attended)

Military service
- Branch/service: United States Army
- Rank: Staff Sergeant
- Unit: Utah Army National Guard

Gary Richard Herbert (born May 7, 1947) is an American politician who served as the 17th governor of Utah from 2009 to 2021. A member of the Republican Party, he chaired the National Governors Association during the 2015–2016 cycle.

Herbert was appointed to a seat on the Utah County Commission in 1990, where he served 14 years. He ran for the Republican nomination for governor in 2004, ultimately becoming fellow Republican candidate Jon Huntsman's running mate in the general election. Herbert served as the sixth lieutenant governor of Utah from 2005 until August 11, 2009, when he assumed the governorship following the resignation of Huntsman, who was appointed to serve as the United States Ambassador to China by President Barack Obama. Herbert was elected to serve out the remainder of the term in a special gubernatorial election in 2010, defeating Democratic nominee Salt Lake County Mayor Peter Corroon with 64% of the vote. He won election to a full four-year term in 2012, defeating Democratic Businessman Peter Cooke with 68% of the vote and was re-elected to a second full four-year term in 2016. Herbert announced in 2019 that he would not seek re-election to a third full term in 2020; he endorsed the gubernatorial candidacy of his Lieutenant Governor, Spencer Cox.

With a tenure spanning 11 years and 5 months, he is the second-longest serving Governor of Utah, behind Cal Rampton, and the longest-serving Republican in that office.

== Early life, education and career ==
Herbert was born in American Fork, the son of Carol (Boley) and Paul Richard Peters. His parents divorced when he was a toddler; his mother soon remarried to Duane Barlow Herbert, who legally adopted him. His biological father also remarried, but Herbert and his paternal half-siblings were raised in different households and had minimal contact with each other. Herbert grew up in Orem, Utah. He graduated from Orem High School, served a two-year mission for the Church of Jesus Christ of Latter-day Saints in the Eastern States Mission and later attended Brigham Young University, but did not graduate.

He is married to Jeanette Snelson Herbert; they have six children and sixteen grandchildren. Mrs. Herbert was born in Preston, Idaho. She moved with her family as a young child to Springville, Utah. She is Honorary Chair of the Governor's Commission on Literacy.

Herbert served for 6 years as a member of the Utah Army National Guard, becoming a staff sergeant. Following his time in the National Guard, he set up a real estate firm, Herbert and Associates Realtors. Herbert was president of the Utah Association of Counties and Utah Association of Realtors. Mrs. Herbert ran a childcare service, The Kids Connection.

== Political career ==
=== Utah County Commission ===
Between 1990 and 2004, Herbert served as a commissioner on the Utah County Commission. He replaced Brent Morris in 1990. During his time as a commissioner, Herbert also served as presidents of the Utah Association of Counties and the Utah Association of Realtors. Larry Ellertson succeeded Herbert as County Commissioner.

=== 2004 election ===
In November 2003, Herbert began campaigning for the Republican nomination for Governor of Utah. In April 2004, a month before the state convention at which the gubernatorial nominee would be selected, Herbert joined forces with then-rival Jon Huntsman, Jr., becoming the latter's running mate. The Huntsman-Herbert ticket defeated incumbent governor Olene S. Walker at the convention, before going on to win in the November election. Herbert subsequently became lieutenant governor.

=== Lieutenant Governor of Utah ===
As lieutenant governor, Herbert ran the state electoral office and managed the campaign disclosure system. His record on those responsibilities was somewhat mixed, improving standards marginally but seeing the state slip overall on nationwide rankings published by the Campaign Disclosure Project. Moreover, Herbert's office was criticized by the same organization for failing to enforce campaign disclosure laws more vigorously. In 2007, Herbert oversaw the first statewide voter referendum to take place since the creation of the Lieutenant Governor's post. During this time, Herbert was the chairman of statewide commissions such as the Commission on Volunteers, the Commission on Civic and Character Education, and the Emergency Management Administrative Council.

=== 2008 election ===
Huntsman and Herbert faced little opposition during their 2008 campaign for re-election, avoiding a primary election after achieving a plurality of votes at the state Republican Party convention. The Republican ticket was re-elected to office with a record 77 percent of the vote.

=== Governor of Utah ===
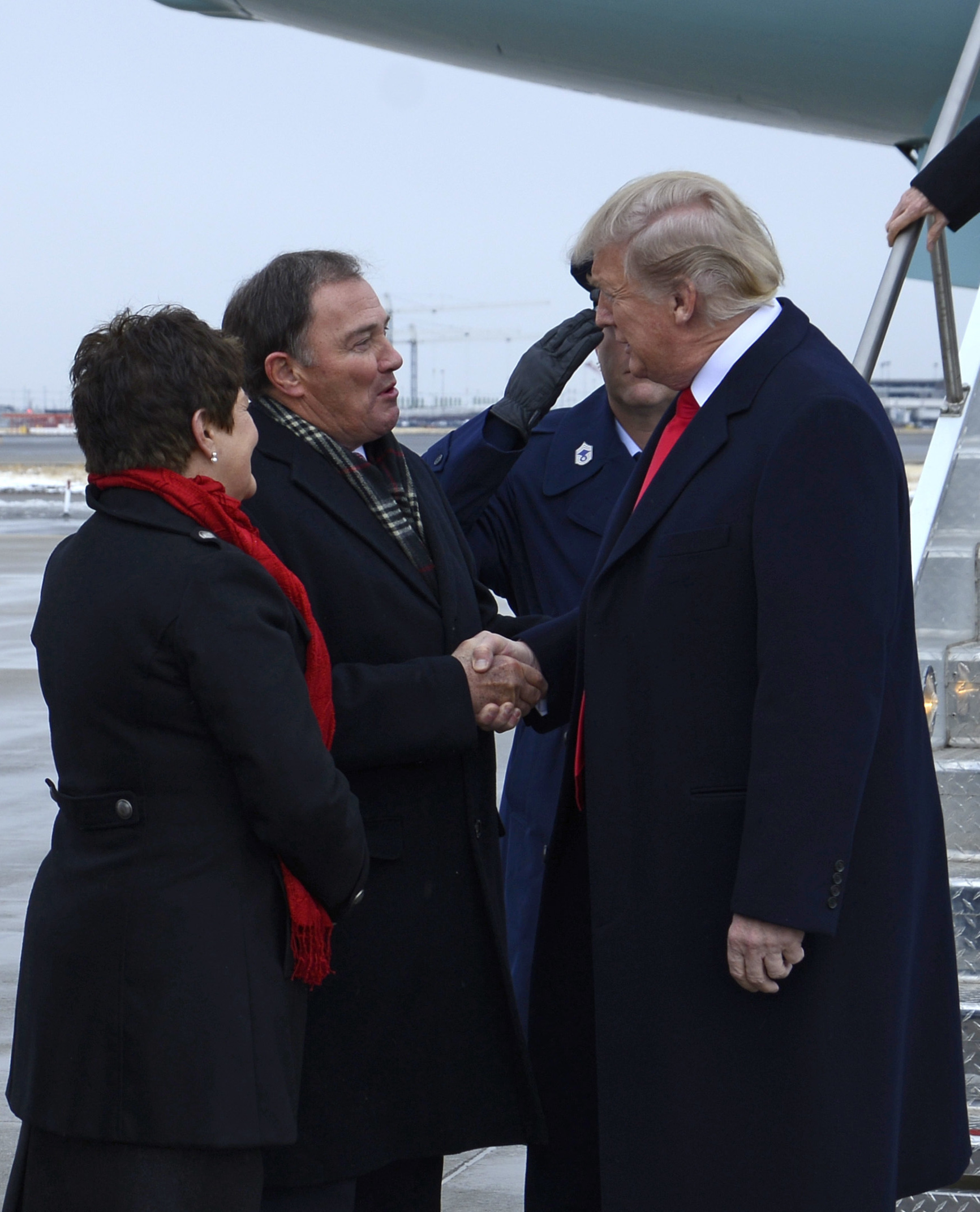
Herbert greets President Donald Trump in December 2017

==== 2010 ====
Herbert became Governor of Utah on August 11, 2009, after Governor Jon Huntsman stepped down to become Ambassador to China. As the Republican gubernatorial nominee in the 2010 special election, Herbert defeated his Democratic opponent, Salt Lake County Mayor Peter Corroon, 64% to 32%.

==== 2012 ====
In 2012, Herbert won election to a full four-year term. He defeated his Democratic opponent, retired Major General Peter Cooke, by a margin of 69% to 28%.

Important legislation included the passage of the Utah Transfer of Public Lands Act which Herbert signed into law on 23 March 2012.

==== 2015 ====
Herbert served as the vice chair for the National Governors Association from 2014 to 2015 and served as chair of the association from 2015 to 2016.

==== 2016 ====
Herbert won re-election to a second full term in 2016. He defeated the Democratic nominee, entrepreneur Mike Weinholtz, 66.7% to 28.7%.

== Political positions ==
=== Economics ===
In a 2010 statement, Herbert took partial credit for Utah's relatively quick recovery from the economic crisis which began in 2008, stating:

The best methods to foster job growth are not complex or secret, but require discipline: low taxes, limited government spending, and a focus on a business friendly environment to encourage private capital investment.

=== Education ===
As of December 1, 2009, the Utah State Governor's website showed that Herbert listed "public and higher education" as one of four "priorities." (The other three listed priorities were "economic development", "energy security" and "infrastructure"). The Governor's site explained that Utah must improve its public education system to remain competitive and to empower its individual citizens to succeed, and the site said that "attracting and retaining the best teachers into our schools" was a way Utah could accomplish educational excellence. In his 2012 re-election bid, Herbert was endorsed by the Utah Education Association.

In March 2012, Herbert vetoed an anti- sex education bill. The bill, HB363, would have allowed schools to stop teaching sex education entirely and required those that kept the lessons to teach abstinence only. In vetoing it, Herbert said "HB363 simply goes too far by constricting parental options... I cannot sign a bill that deprives parents of their choice".

=== LGBT rights ===
After Salt Lake City passed a non-discrimination ordinance which would protect gay and lesbian people from discrimination in employment and housing, a member of the Utah Legislature indicated that he would seek a statewide law to prevent cities from passing ordinances related to civil rights. Herbert has asserted that municipalities should have the right to pass rules and ordinances absent state interference. On August 27, 2009, Herbert indicated at a news conference that he did not support making sexual orientation a legally protected class, saying: "We don't have to have a rule for everybody to do the right thing. We ought to just do the right thing because it's the right thing to do and we don't have to have a law that punishes us if we don't." The gay rights advocacy group Equality Utah criticized Herbert's statements and expressed the view that he did not fully comprehend the challenges faced by gay people in Utah.

Following the legalization of same-sex marriage in Utah by a U.S. district court on December 20, 2013, Herbert's office issued the following statement: "I am very disappointed an activist federal judge is attempting to override the will of the people of Utah. I am working with my legal counsel and the acting Attorney General to determine the best course to defend traditional marriage within the borders of Utah". Shortly thereafter, the Attorney General's office did indeed request an emergency stay to stop further same-sex marriages from occurring in the state. After elected officials in Oregon and Pennsylvania chose not to defend same-sex marriage bans from constitutional challenge, Herbert expressed his disappointment. He took issue with a comparison between same-sex marriage and interracial marriage, saying, "Clearly the actions involved in sexual activity ultimately end up being choices. What your attraction may be is something else, but how you act upon those impulses is a choice."

On March 12, 2015, however, Herbert signed into law a bill prohibiting discrimination on the basis of sexual orientation and gender identity in employment and housing in the state of Utah. Utah thus became the 19th state to pass such a law. According to The Salt Lake Tribune, the law was "hailed nationwide for its attempt to balance the advancements in gay rights with the deeply held beliefs and conservative values of churches and other religious groups". In January 2020, after a proposal in the state legislature to ban conversion therapy on minors stalled, Herbert signed an executive order banning conversion therapy on minors statewide. The order includes exceptions for religious officials, parents and grandparents.

=== Gun rights ===
Herbert is a moderate supporter of the right to bear arms, in 2010 signing state Senate Bill 11, which protects the right of Utah-based companies to manufacture firearms for sale and use within the State. However, Herbert vetoed a Constitutional Carry bill in 2013 (The bill would have allowed open or concealed carry without a permit by anyone who can legally possess a handgun.), and in a 2018 interview, he said "I don't know that there's any reason to have anything more than a seven- or nine-shot magazine. Once you get past a typical size when you go out hunting, you're probably having excess baggage you don't need."

=== Medicaid expansion ===
In February 2019, Herbert defied the result of a ballot initiative where voters voted for an expansion of Medicaid. Herbert instead supported a GOP-authored bill which implemented a restricted version of Medicaid; this version insured 60,000 fewer people than the expansion in the ballot initiative and was estimated to initially cost the state more.

=== Medical marijuana ===
Herbert has openly opposed the legalization of medical marijuana over concerns that it would lead to recreational use. He did, however, sign the passage of HB195 and HB197, which allows people who have an estimated six months or less left to live to have access to marijuana.

=== Free-range parenting ===
Herbert supported and signed the free-range parenting bill for Utah in March 2018. After the implementation of the law, in May 2018, Utah became the first state in America to legalize free-range parenting.

=== Utah Inland Port ===
Herbert has supported the creation of a Utah Inland Port. He signed HB234, a bill which created an Inland Port Authority, and HB433, a bill to increase the extent of the port and the powers of the Port Authority. Earlier, Herbert had created an Inland Port Exploratory Committee to "drive the development" of an inland port in Utah. At the time, he stated that "despite anti-trade, isolationist rhetoric at the national level, Utah remains committed to promoting international trade."

== Controversies ==
=== Campaign contributions ===
==== 2009-2010 ====
Merit gave separate $25,000 checks to the Herbert campaign on November 2, 2009, and January 21, 2010, and Herbert and Lampropoulos met in October 2009. In December 2009, Merit got $4.4 million in tax credits. Lampropoulos has publicly endorsed Herbert and appears in a television commercial supporting Herbert's reelection bid.

In February 2010, The Deseret News reported that Herbert's campaign had received a $10,000 donation from Alton Coal Development, a coal company that had complained about delays in regulators issuing a permit for strip-mining. The Associated Press reported that a memorandum they had obtained showed that state regulators later agreed to fast-track a decision regarding the permit, despite environmental concerns from local residents. According to a businessman who lives near the proposed mine, regulators arrived within days of a meeting between Herbert and the coal company, and they felt pressure to make a quick decision. A Utah regulator said that this was not the case and that Herbert did not make any orders about whether to issue a permit. A spokeswoman for Herbert said that he was not aware of the donation, and that given his long-term support of the energy industry, it was not surprising that Alton made a donation.

In September 2010, KSL TV reported another instance of Herbert accepting campaign donations from companies who benefited from state contracts related to the I-15 CORE rebuild in Utah County—the state's biggest ever road project. Three teams vied for the contract. One gave the governor's campaign no money, another gave $35,000. The third team, Provo River Constructors, gave Herbert's campaign much more. Wadsworth Brothers Construction and partners Ames, Ralph Wadsworth and Fluor have contributed more than $80,000. Around the time most of those donations came in Guy Wadsworth got two meetings with the governor, apparently something no other bidding team had. A month later, the state awarded the $1.725 billion contract to Provo River.

KSL TV also reported that Herbert had meetings with, and received donations from Fred Lampropoulos, CEO of Merit Medical, months before the Governor's Office of Economic Development awarded a tax break to Merit to expand its business in Utah.

==== 2016 ====
In May 2016, Herbert was criticized for unethical campaign fund-raising activity. In a tape that was made without his knowledge, as Herbert was trying to get donors to contribute his campaign finance money, Herbert said that he would go anywhere and do whatever it takes. "I'm available. I'm Available Jones!" he was heard saying on the tape. Although he did say that there would be no quid pro quo he also said to the lobbyists in attendance that even if he did not agree with them that he would make them happy. Herbert's Republican challenger Jonathan E. Johnson said that he was so upset that he was physically shaking when he heard what Herbert did. Herbert's Democratic opponent Mike Weinholtz promised that if he were elected to be Utah's governor, that he work to change the laws of Utah so that what Herbert did would be illegal.

Later in May 2016, Herbert apologized, saying that he regretted his actions and the actions of his campaign, but he said that he did nothing wrong. Herbert said that he was apologizing for his remarks earlier in the month, when he said "I'm available. I'm available Jones." which was a saying from a character in Lil Abner comic strips in which the character was always available to do something for a price.

=== UDOT's $13,000,000 payment to second-place finisher in highway bidding ===
On September 13, 2010, Utah Department of Transportation admitted to paying $13,000,000 to prevent a lawsuit by the second-place finisher Flatiron/Skanska/Zachry (FSZ) for the Interstate 15 rebuild project in Utah County. UDOT admitted that after "adjustments" were made to the scoring system, the 1.7 billion dollar contract was awarded to Provo River Constructors (PRC) after winning the bidding process by a single point. UDOT claimed the $13,000,000 payment to FSZ was to avoid any further or pending legal action. Peter Corroon's campaign questioned whether this was related to a $87,500 donation made by PRC to Herbert's campaign. In a press conference on the same day, Herbert denied any knowledge of the $13,000,000 payoff to FSZ. However, on September 21, 2010, ABC4 reported that on September 9 four days before Herbert press conference UDOT informed Jason Perry, the Governor's Chief of Staff of a payment. On September 13, hours before Herbert's press conference, UDOT again informed Perry of a payoff and also specified the amount of the payment.

=== Governor signs House Bill 477 ===
During the 2011 legislative session, Herbert signed into law House Bill 477 after it passed through the legislature in three days. The bill would have drastically reduced the ability of citizens to access public records, especially records of Legislators. After large public outcry, Herbert announced he would sign the bill yet also call a special session to repeal the new law. The law was repealed two weeks later, and Herbert was criticized for costing the state $30,000 for not simply vetoing the bill when he first had a chance.

=== Governor signs House Bill 187 ===
On March 20, 2012, Herbert signed into law House Bill 187, dealing with "Agricultural Operation Interference" despite several individuals and organizations urging him veto it. The new law makes it a crime to take pictures or sound recordings while on the property of any agricultural production facility, even if the person is not trespassing (e.g. an employee of said facility) and even if the person is not interfering with anything (i.e. if nobody knows the recording is taking place). Offenders are guilty of a class B misdemeanor. Critics of the bill say that the law creates a safe haven for animal abuse and other criminal activity and that it adds nothing beneficial to legitimate operations. Proponents of the bill state that the purpose of the legislation is to prevent whistleblowers from unfairly damaging farming operations. The Humane Society has many examples of undercover videos that this bill is meant to prevent.

=== Governor signs Senate Bill 136 ===
On March 20, 2018, Herbert signed S.B. 136 (sponsored by Wayne Harper and Mike Schultz) into law. Among other provisions, S.B. 136 includes an additional annual registration fee of up to $120 on clean air vehicles. The additional fees were opposed by air quality advocates such as the nonprofits Breathe Utah, and Utah Clean Energy which has stated the fees are misguided. Clean air advocates have voiced concerns that the additional fees will slow electric vehicle adoption and promote poorer air quality in Utah. There are an estimated 1,000–2,000 deaths in Utah annually due to poor air quality, and emissions from gasoline and diesel powered vehicles, are the primary cause of pollution.

== Electoral history ==
Utah Governor Special Election, 2010
Party	Candidate	Votes	%
Republican	Gary Herbert (inc.)	412,151	64.1
Democratic	Peter Corroon	205,246	31.9
Independent	Farley Anderson	13,038	2.0
Libertarian	Andrew McCullough	12,871	2.0
Write-in	Michael William Heath	1	0.0

Utah Governor Election, 2012
Party	Candidate	Votes	%
Republican	Gary Herbert (inc.)	688,592	68.41
Democratic	Peter Cooke	277,622	27.58
Libertarian	Ken Larsen	22,611	2.25
Constitution	Kirk Pearson	17,696	1.76
Write-in	Dennis Owen	2	0.00
Write-in	David Cannon	1	0.00

Utah Governor Republican Primary Election, 2016
Party	Candidate	Votes	%
Republican	Gary Herbert (inc.)	173,805	71.77
Republican	Jonathan Johnson	68,379	28.23

Political offices
Preceded by Gayle McKeachnie	Lieutenant Governor of Utah; 2005–2009	Succeeded by Greg Bell
Preceded by Jon Huntsman	Governor of Utah; 2009–2021	Succeeded by Spencer Cox
Preceded by John Hickenlooper	Chair of the National Governors Association; 2015–2016	Succeeded by Terry McAuliffe
Party political offices
Preceded by Jon Huntsman	Republican nominee for Governor of Utah; 2010, 2012, 2016	Succeeded by Spencer Cox
U.S. order of precedence (ceremonial)
Preceded by Jon Huntsman Jr. as Former Governor	Order of precedence of the United States; Within Utah	Succeeded by Jack Markell as Former Governor
Preceded by Jon Huntsman Jr. as Former Governor	Order of precedence of the United States; Outside Utah	Succeeded by David Walters as Former Governor
