= Richard Snelgrove =

American politician

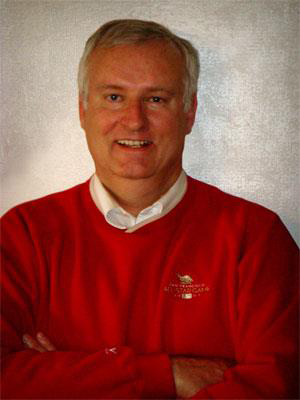

Salt Lake County Council Member At-large
- In office January 2011 – December 2022
- Preceded by: Jenny Wilson
- Succeeded by: Suzanne Harrison

Personal details
- Born: February 5, 1955 (age 71) Salt Lake City, Utah
- Party: Republican
- Spouse: JoLynn
- Children: 4
- Education: University of Utah

Richard Snelgrove is an American politician and small business owner from Utah. Through 2022, he was an at-large member and the chair of the Salt Lake County Council, representing 1.2 million residents. He was elected in 2010 and was re-elected in 2016. He advocates for a collaborative and bipartisan approach in County government to address issues and serve people.

== Political career ==
Richard Snelgrove was born in Salt Lake City, Utah and raised in the Sugar House area. He attended local public schools and graduated from The University of Utah. He and his wife JoLynn are parents of four children and reside in Murray, Utah. He has served as a little league baseball and basketball coach.

Richard Snelgrove has lived in Venezuela and Argentina and served as an Election Observer to Latin America for the State Department. He was a member of the National Small Business Advisory Council during the George H.W. Bush administration advising the federal government and business on issues affecting America's small business community. He has been elected three times as a member of the United States Electoral College. He served as district director for Utah U.S. Congressman Merrill Cook. He has chaired the Salt Lake County Republican Party and the Utah Republican Party. He has been a Republican national delegate multiple times.

He has founded and managed several successful small businesses. He is President of Snelgrove Travel Centers Inc., which recently celebrated 30 years in business.

Snelgrove was elected in November 2010 to the six-year at-large seat on the County Council with 55 percent of the vote.

He ran unsuccessfully for Salt Lake County Mayor in 2012.

Snelgrove served as Salt Lake County Council chair in 2015 and again in 2018. Previously he served as vice chair and chair pro-tem. He is a member of the Boards of Directors of the Salt Lake County Library System and the Jordan River Commission.

He ran for a second six-year term in the November 2016 election where he faced no in-party opposition. In the general election, he won with 51.72% of the vote.

Councilman Snelgrove lost his bid for reelection in November 2022 to Democrat Suzanne Harrison.

List of Accomplishments in office

• Councilman Snelgrove is honored to have received the prestigious Taxpayer Advocate of the Year Award from the Utah Taxpayers Association "in recognition of his exemplary defense of taxpayers against tax increases and non-essential county spending". • He pressed the Utah Transit Authority to open its closed committee meetings by threatening to delay $150 million in county funding. • Based on his efforts, the Council tripled the opportunities for members of the public to address the council. • He passed a county ordinance requiring that the budget be proposed before the general election so the voters will be aware of any proposed tax increases. • He successfully pushed to re-establish performance auditing of Salt Lake County operations. • He has championed clean air initiatives such as no fare transit during the winter inversion months. • He has worked to mitigate the effects of water flowing over contaminated mine tailings in our mountain watershed. • As a hiker, he has advocated for expansion of the trail network throughout Salt Lake County. • He has voted against and actively opposes a proposed limestone quarry in Parleys Canyon. • He passed an ordinance requiring that all county bond measures be part of a general election so they will receive wider scrutiny and participation by the voters. • He passed an ordinance requiring additional transparency in county contracts, especially those given out under emergency no-bid status. • He is currently fighting efforts to fund a $592 million gondola in Little Cottonwood Canyon. • He is working on trail development and recreational opportunities in the Oquirrh Mountains for west side residents. Such developments will also take pressure off east side canyons.
