= 2012 Utah gubernatorial election =

- November 6, 2012
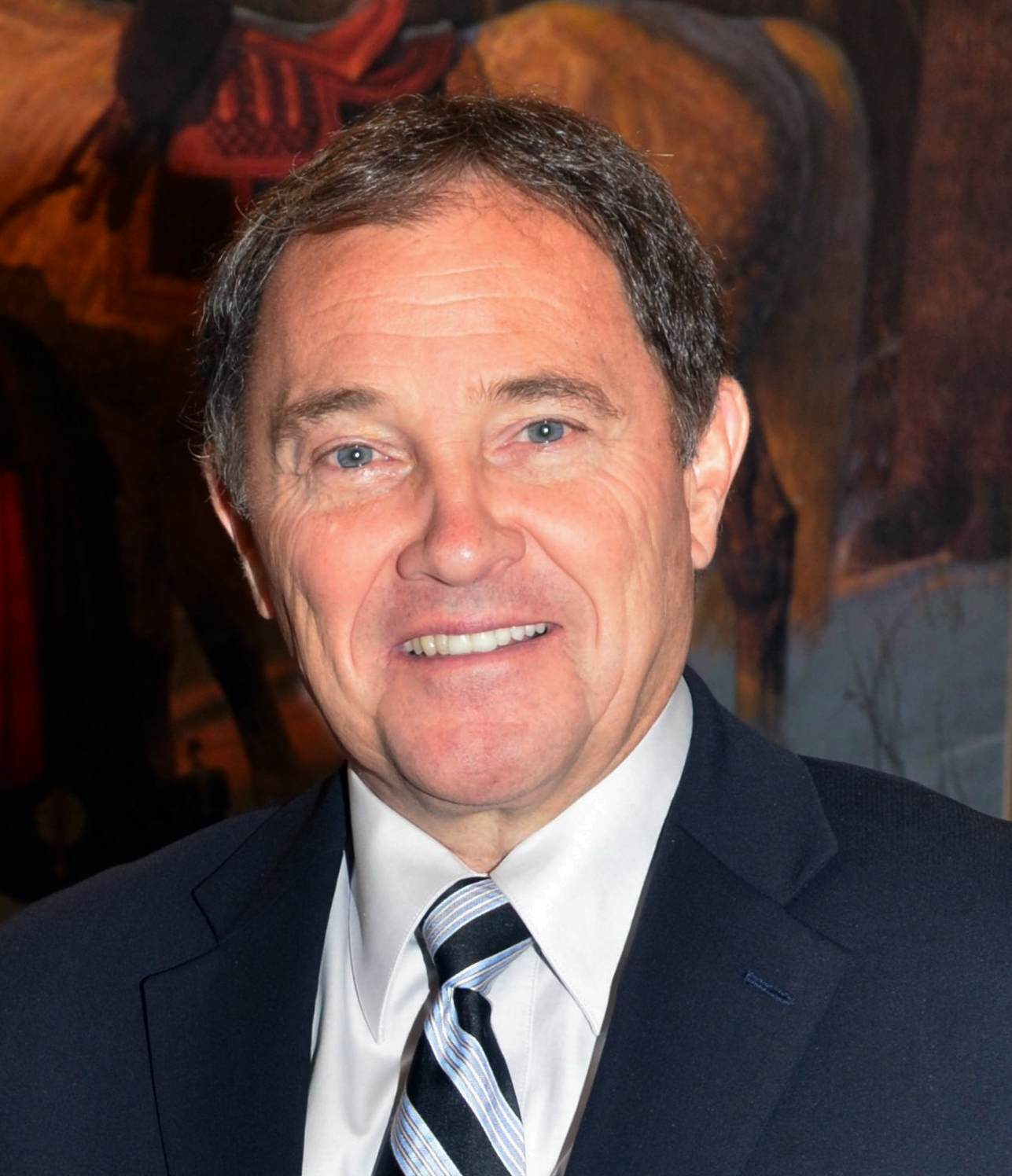

| Nominee | Gary Herbert | Peter Cooke |
| Party | Republican | Democratic |
| Running mate | Greg Bell | Vincent Rampton |
| Popular vote | 624,678 | 253,514 |
| Percentage | 68.41% | 27.58% |
- Herbert: 40–50% 50–60% 60–70% 70–80% 80–90%
Governor before election
Gary Herbert
Republican
Elected Governor
Gary Herbert
Republican

The 2012 Utah gubernatorial election was held on November 6, 2012. Incumbent Republican Governor Gary Herbert won reelection to a full term.

== Republican nomination ==
=== Candidates ===
- Gary Herbert, incumbent governor

==== Defeated at convention ====
- David Kirkham, businessman and co-founder of the Utah tea party
- Morgan Philpot, former state representative and nominee for the U.S. House of Representatives in 2010
- Lane Ronnow
- William Skokos, energy entrepreneur and CEO of Standard American Oil Company
- Ken Sumsion, state representative

==== Declined ====
- Stephen Sandstrom, state representative
- Mark Shurtleff, state attorney general

=== Polling ===
| Poll source | Date(s) administered | Sample size | Margin of error | Gary Herbert | David Kirkham | Morgan Philpot | Ken Sumison | Other/ Undecided |
|---|---|---|---|---|---|---|---|---|
| Mason-Dixon | April 9–11, 2012 | 422 | ± 4.9% | 69% | 2% | 13% | 1% | 15% |

=== Convention results ===
Republican convention, 1st round results
| Party | Candidate | Votes | % |
|---|---|---|---|
| Republican | Gary Herbert | 2,253 | 57.67% |
| Republican | Morgan Philpot | 905 | 23.16% |
| Republican | David Kirkham | 358 | 9.16% |
| Republican | Ken Sumsion | 254 | 6.50% |
| Republican | William Skokos | 128 | 3.28% |
| Republican | Lane Ronnow | 9 | 0.23% |
| Total votes | | 3,907 | 100.00% |

Republican convention, 2nd round results
| Party | Candidate | Votes | % |
|---|---|---|---|
| Republican | Gary Herbert | 2,464 | 63.26% |
| Republican | Morgan Philpot | 1,431 | 36.74% |
| Total votes | | 3,895 | 100.00% |

== Democratic nomination ==
=== Candidate ===
- Peter Cooke, businessman and retired major general in the United States Army Reserve

==== Declined ====
- Jim Matheson, U.S. representative

== General election ==
=== Candidates ===
- Gary Herbert (Republican), incumbent governor

- Running mate: Greg Bell, incumbent lieutenant governor

- Peter Cooke (Democratic), businessman and retired major general in the United States Army Reserve

- Running mate: Vincent Rampton, attorney and son of former Governor Cal Rampton

- Kirk D Pearson (Constitution)

- Running mate: Tim Aalders

- Ken Larsen (Libertarian), medical researcher

- Running mate: Robert Latham, attorney

=== Debates ===
- Complete video of debate, October 11, 2012 - C-SPAN

=== Predictions ===
| Source | Ranking | As of |
|---|---|---|
| The Cook Political Report | Solid R | November 1, 2012 |
| Sabato's Crystal Ball | Safe R | November 5, 2012 |
| Rothenberg Political Report | Safe R | November 2, 2012 |
| Real Clear Politics | Safe R | November 5, 2012 |

=== Polling ===
| Poll source | Date(s) administered | Sample size | Margin of error | Gary Herbert (R) | Peter Cooke (D) | Other/ Undecided |
|---|---|---|---|---|---|---|
| Deseret News/KSL | October 26–November 1, 2012 | 870 | ± 43.4% | 69% | 24% | 5% |
| Key Research | October 9–13, 2012 | 500 | ± 4.4% | 65% | 19% | 15% |
| Utah State University | October 8–13, 2012 | n/a | ± 7.6% | 76% | 17% | 7% |
| Mason-Dixon | April 9–11, 2012 | 625 | ± 4% | 65% | 27% | 8% |

=== Results ===
2012 Utah gubernatorial election
| Party | Candidate | Votes | % | ±% |
|---|---|---|---|---|
| Republican | Gary Herbert (incumbent) | 688,592 | 68.41% | +4.35% |
| Democratic | Peter Cooke | 277,622 | 27.58% | −4.32% |
| Libertarian | Ken Larsen | 22,611 | 2.25% | +0.25% |
| Constitution | Kirk D. Pearson | 17,696 | 1.76% | |
| Write-in | Dennis C. Owen | 2 | 0.00% | |
| Write-in | David J. Cannon | 1 | 0.00% | |
| Total votes | | 1,006,524 | 100.00% | |
| Majority | | 410,970 | 40.83% | |
| Republican hold | | Swing | +8.67% | |

==== By county ====
| County | Gary Herbert Republican | | Peter Cooke Democratic | | Ken Larsen Libertarian | | Kirk D. Pearson Constitution | | Margin | | Total votes cast |
| County | # | % | # | % | # | % | # | % | # | % | Total votes cast |
|---|---|---|---|---|---|---|---|---|---|---|---|
| Beaver | 2,040 | 80.89% | 390 | 15.46% | 39 | 1.55% | 53 | 2.10% | 1,650 | 65.42% | 2,522 |
| Box Elder | 15,802 | 82.02% | 2,767 | 14.36% | 307 | 1.59% | 389 | 2.02% | 13,035 | 67.66% | 19,265 |
| Cache | 32,173 | 77.11% | 7,595 | 18.20% | 984 | 2.36% | 969 | 2.32% | 24,578 | 58.91% | 41,721 |
| Carbon | 4,787 | 63.44% | 2,494 | 33.05% | 151 | 2.00% | 114 | 1.51% | 2,293 | 30.39% | 7,546 |
| Daggett | 390 | 76.62% | 96 | 18.86% | 15 | 2.95% | 8 | 1.57% | 294 | 57.76% | 509 |
| Davis | 89,002 | 74.21% | 26,794 | 22.34% | 2,232 | 1.86% | 1,909 | 1.59% | 62,208 | 51.87% | 119,939 (Note: Includes 2 write-in votes for Dennis C. Owen) |
| Duchesne | 5,388 | 85.27% | 688 | 10.89% | 84 | 1.33% | 159 | 2.52% | 4,700 | 74.38% | 6,319 |
| Emery | 3,532 | 79.62% | 728 | 16.41% | 105 | 2.37% | 71 | 1.60% | 2,804 | 63.21% | 4,436 |
| Garfield | 1,753 | 81.61% | 333 | 15.50% | 27 | 1.26% | 35 | 1.63% | 1,420 | 66.11% | 2,148 |
| Grand | 1,968 | 50.96% | 1,689 | 43.73% | 149 | 3.86% | 56 | 1.45% | 279 | 7.22% | 3,862 |
| Iron | 13,094 | 79.34% | 2,464 | 14.93% | 443 | 2.68% | 503 | 3.05% | 10,630 | 64.41% | 16,504 |
| Juab | 3,182 | 80.82% | 588 | 14.94% | 78 | 1.98% | 89 | 2.26% | 2,594 | 65.89% | 3,937 |
| Kane | 2,455 | 74.24% | 708 | 21.41% | 78 | 2.36% | 66 | 2.00% | 1,747 | 52.83% | 3,307 |
| Millard | 4,049 | 80.69% | 704 | 14.03% | 88 | 1.75% | 177 | 3.53% | 3,345 | 66.66% | 5,018 |
| Morgan | 3,697 | 81.15% | 699 | 15.34% | 57 | 1.25% | 103 | 2.26% | 2,998 | 65.80% | 4,556 |
| Piute | 658 | 86.01% | 82 | 10.72% | 14 | 1.83% | 11 | 1.44% | 576 | 75.29% | 765 |
| Rich | 841 | 85.21% | 122 | 12.36% | 12 | 1.22% | 12 | 1.22% | 719 | 72.85% | 987 |
| Salt Lake | 209,310 | 55.36% | 154,361 | 40.82% | 9,472 | 2.51% | 4,963 | 1.31% | 54,949 | 14.53% | 378,107 (Note: Includes 1 write-in vote for David J. Cannon) |
| San Juan | 3,095 | 59.01% | 1,941 | 37.01% | 105 | 2.00% | 104 | 1.98% | 1,154 | 22.00% | 5,245 |
| Sanpete | 7,676 | 80.91% | 1,384 | 14.59% | 152 | 1.60% | 275 | 2.90% | 6,292 | 66.32% | 9,487 |
| Sevier | 6,632 | 82.86% | 1,044 | 13.04% | 147 | 1.84% | 181 | 2.26% | 5,588 | 69.82% | 8,004 |
| Summit | 8,541 | 49.67% | 8,045 | 46.79% | 438 | 2.55% | 171 | 0.99% | 496 | 2.88% | 17,195 |
| Tooele | 13,072 | 68.53% | 4,969 | 26.05% | 430 | 2.25% | 605 | 3.17% | 8,103 | 42.48% | 19,076 |
| Uintah | 9,950 | 86.77% | 1,103 | 9.62% | 187 | 1.63% | 227 | 1.98% | 8,847 | 77.15% | 11,467 |
| Utah | 144,942 | 82.77% | 22,630 | 12.92% | 3,739 | 2.14% | 3,812 | 2.18% | 122,312 | 69.84% | 175,123 |
| Wasatch | 6,824 | 71.79% | 2,344 | 24.66% | 184 | 1.94% | 153 | 1.61% | 4,480 | 47.13% | 9,505 |
| Washington | 41,915 | 78.44% | 9,244 | 17.30% | 1,156 | 2.16% | 1,120 | 2.10% | 32,671 | 61.14% | 53,435 |
| Wayne | 1,050 | 79.67% | 239 | 18.13% | 14 | 1.06% | 15 | 1.14% | 811 | 61.53% | 1,318 |
| Weber | 50,774 | 67.50% | 21,377 | 28.42% | 1,724 | 2.29% | 1,346 | 1.79% | 29,397 | 39.08% | 75,221 |
| Total | 688,592 | 68.41% | 277,622 | 27.58% | 22,611 | 2.25% | 17,696 | 1.76% | 410,970 | 40.83% | 1,006,524 |

==== Counties that flipped from Democratic to Republican ====
- Summit (largest municipality: Park City)

==== By congressional district ====
Herbert won all four congressional districts, including one that elected a Democrat.

| District | Herbert | Cooke | Representative |
|---|---|---|---|
| 1st | 72.67% | 23.35% | Rob Bishop |
| 2nd | 63.67% | 32.21% | Chris Stewart |
| 3rd | 73.79% | 22.32% | Jason Chaffetz |
| 4th | 63.21% | 32.75% | Jim Matheson |
