= Nancy Workman =

American politician (1940–2020)

Mayor of Salt Lake County, Utah
- In office 2000–2004
- Preceded by: Office created
- Succeeded by: Peter Corroon

Personal details
- Born: December 9, 1940 Pueblo, Colorado, US
- Died: May 3, 2020 (aged 79) St. George, Utah, US
- Party: Republican
- Spouse: Reed Workman
- Education: University of Utah

Nancy Workman (December 9, 1940 – May 3, 2020) was an American politician who was the first county mayor of Salt Lake County, and a member of the Republican Party. She was the last Republican to have held this office. She was born in Pueblo, Colorado, but grew up in Boise, Idaho where her father was an automobile dealer. She finally settled in the Salt Lake Valley during her senior year of high school.

Workman went to college at the University of Utah and ran a construction business before seeking office as county recorder. After an unsuccessful bid in 1990 she was finally elected in 1994 to a six-year term. Later, after the post was approved by the county commission, Workman was elected to the newly created post of county mayor of Salt Lake County.

As County Mayor, Workman presided over a budget of nearly $700 million and never asked for a tax increase. She moved the county-owned planetarium from its historic but outdated facility on State Street to the new Gateway shopping development. Workman also worked to establish a fire district and supported self-determination of unincorporated areas in the county.

In 2004, Democratic District Attorney David Yocum accused Workman of misusing funds to pay for an employee at a local chapter of the Boys & Girls Clubs of America. She faced two felony charges of misusing county monies by allegedly placing county employees at the club: one Second Degree Felony and one Third Degree.

During the trial, it was revealed that the county employee was actually hired as a replacement for Workman's daughter at the Boys & Girls Club, rather than an assistant, as the D.A. had suspected. On February 10, 2005 a jury found Workman not guilty of all charges.

Originally, Workman decided not to drop out of the 2004 county mayoral race, even when the Utah GOP dropped public support for her. The Republicans replaced her with Ellis Ivory as a write-in candidate. On October 12, 2004, Workman then dropped out of the race in an effort to give the Republicans a better chance at securing the office. She was succeeded in office by Democrat Peter Corroon.

Workman later served as the president and CEO of the Sandy Area Chamber of Commerce. She died at her home in St. George in 2020, aged 79.

Political offices
New office	Mayor of Salt Lake County; 2000–2004	Succeeded by Peter Corroon
