= Peter Corroon =

American politician (born 1964)

Chair of the Utah Democratic Party
- In office April 2014 – June 2017
- Preceded by: Jim Dabakis
- Succeeded by: Daisy Thomas

Mayor of Salt Lake County
- In office November 2004 – January 2013
- Deputy: Nichole Dunn
- Preceded by: Nancy Workman
- Succeeded by: Ben McAdams

Personal details
- Born: Peter Maitland Corroon; July 16, 1964 (age 62) Greenwich, Connecticut, U.S.
- Party: Democratic
- Spouse: Amy
- Children: 3
- Education: Carnegie Mellon University (BS); Golden Gate University (JD); New York University (MS)
- Website: Official website

Peter Maitland Corroon (born 1964) is an American politician. He served as a former Utah Democratic Party chair, and the former mayor of Salt Lake County, Utah from 2005-2013, He was the unsuccessful Democratic nominee for governor in the 2010 election.

== Early life, education and career ==
Corroon graduated from Carnegie-Mellon University with a bachelor's degree in civil engineering. He obtained a Juris Doctor degree from Golden Gate University School of Law and a master's from New York University in real estate finance and development. He has worked in politics as well as the construction and real estate industries. Corroon currently runs a small real estate development and property management company with his brother and wife. The company focuses on building affordable housing and community redevelopment projects.

== Political career ==
Peter Corroon was elected as the Salt Lake County Mayor in 2004. In November 2008, Corroon was re-elected to a second term as Salt Lake County Mayor over Republican challenger Michael Rencker. In January 2010, Corroon announced his candidacy for governor of the State of Utah to challenge incumbent Republican Gary Herbert. In May, he announced his running mate would be Republican State Representative Sheryl Allen creating a bi-partisan ticket for governor and lieutenant governor.

Mayoral Priorities and Accomplishments (2005–2013)

From 2005 to 2013, Corroon's administration focused on planning for future growth of Salt Lake County and the needs of the citizens His administration preserved thousands of acres of open space and park space for future growth. During his two terms as mayor, Salt Lake County also expanded child care facilities in its recreation centers, installed the largest rooftop solar project in the country at the time, created a no-kill policy for the county animal shelter, maintained a AAA bond rating, and worked with Salt Lake City and the State of Utah to reduce chronic homelessness by 72%.

Political Disputes

During his two terms as Mayor of Salt Lake County, Peter Corroon’s administration was marked by several public standoffs with the Salt Lake County Council and state legislative leaders regarding fiscal policy, development subsidies, and governance.

Real Salt Lake Stadium Funding Standoff

In 2006, Corroon opposed allocating $35 million in county hotel-tax revenues toward the construction of Rio Tinto Stadium for Major League Soccer’s Real Salt Lake in Sandy. Corroon argued that the financial projections presented by team ownership were overly optimistic and posed an unnecessary financial risk to taxpayers. His stance put him in direct opposition to soccer club leadership, Sandy municipal officials, and state leaders, including Governor Jon Huntsman Jr. The standoff escalated until 2007, when the Utah State Legislature intervened by passing legislation that bypassed Corroon’s executive authority, redirecting the hotel tax revenue directly to the project.

2009 Budget Veto and Legal Standoff

Following the economic downturn of the 2008 financial crisis, the Salt Lake County Council approved a $5 million property tax increase to balance the county budget. Corroon vetoed the entire budget measure, arguing that the county should rely exclusively on deeper operational cuts rather than tax increases.

Political offices
Preceded by Nancy Workman	Mayor of Salt Lake County; 2005–2013	Succeeded by Ben McAdams
Party political offices
Preceded by Bob Springmeyer	Democratic nominee for Governor of Utah; 2010	Succeeded by Peter Cooke
