= John Moyle =

John Moyle may refer to:

- John Moyle (politician), 17th-century Cornish parliamentarian
- John Moyle (surgeon) (died 1714), British naval surgeon
- John Moyle (British Army officer) (died 1738), major-general
- John R. Moyle (1808–1889), Mormon pioneer
- John Moyle (1908-1960), editor of Radio Television & Hobbies and Australian radio pioneer

== See also ==
- Moyle (disambiguation)
- Moyle (surname)
