= 1908 Utah gubernatorial election =

- November 3, 1908
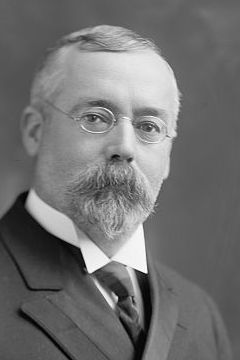

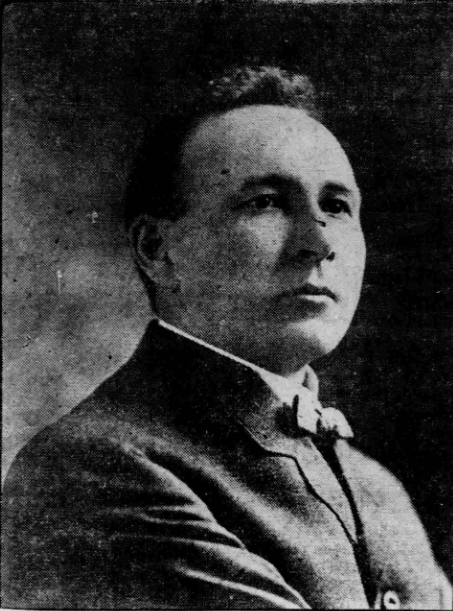

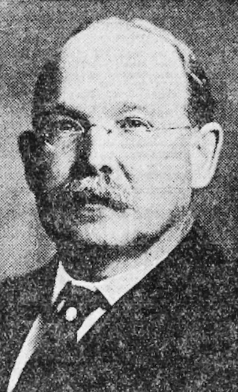
Nominee	William Spry	Jesse William Knight	John A. Street
Party	Republican	Democratic	American
Popular vote	52,913	43,375	11,472
Percentage	47.30%	38.78%	10.26%
- County results Spry: 40–50% 50–60% 60–70% 70–80% Knight: 40–50% 50–60%
Governor before election
John Christopher Cutler
Republican
Elected Governor
William Spry
Republican

The 1908 Utah gubernatorial election was held on November 3, 1908. Republican nominee William Spry defeated Democratic nominee Jesse William Knight with 47.45% of the vote.

== Republican nomination ==
Incumbent governor John C. Cutler, while briefly intended to do so, declined to seek a second term. He dropped out after realizing he had lost support of Senator Reed Smoot and the "Federal Bunch," a group of powerful, federal-level Republicans in Utah. Cutler was part of the group before, and they gave him backing for the nomination against incumbent governor Heber Wells in 1904. He believed if he ran, he would split the party, and instead endorsed William Spry, chairman of the Republican State Committee in 1904, a former member of the Utah House of Representatives, and a US marshal.

== Democratic nomination ==
Democrats attempted to court mining magnate Jesse Knight for the nomination. At first, it was seen that Knight would accept the nomination, and David Evans, one of Knight's closest business associates, was so confident he'd win the general election, he offered to place a large bet in his favor. However, when Evans asked Knight about the nomination on a train in Logan, he declined. Evans reportedly used every argument to change his mind, but to no avail. Evans left the train at Brigham City in disgust, and tore off his "Knight badge" in anger. Evans stated that Knight told him that "...he had had Judge Whitecotton of Provo look up the duties of the governors office and that he found them to be exceedingly onerous. He said that he was 63 years old that he felt that he had neither the time nor the strength to give to the position." Knight himself would also state that he regretted the disappointment he caused, but would say that his business ventures wouldn't give him time to fulfill the duties of the office. On October 3, the Democratic State Committee met at the office of James Moyle to pick a new candidate, in which they choose a new name: Jesse William Knight, son of Jesse Knight.

On October 10, the committee hosted a rally/convention at a theater in Provo, formally putting forth J. William Knight's name for the Democratic nominee for governor. The Salt Lake Herold-Republican reported that the theater "...was packed to the doors with a crowd that also surrounded the theatre and filled the street. Those in this crowd [who] were too far away to hear but not too far away to cheer which they did long and enthusiastically taking their cues from the more fortunate auditors who were close enough to hear the speakers. The affair took on more of the as aspect of an inauguration than a notification." After the "notification" was made, a crowd of a 1,000 people marched from the theater to the home of William Knight, with two bands at the front and back, and each person carrying a torch light. After arriving, the "crowd cheered long and wildly" until William Knight came down to his porch, in which immediately "cannons were fired and Roman candles shot off, horns were tooted and the entire throng joined in cheering the combined noises making an uproar that was deafening." To add to the spectacle, a bonfire was also made outside Knight's residence from attendees carrying lumber and boxes. Knight then grab an American flag from hanging from his residence, which he then waved, increasing the cheering so much that "...it might almost have been heard in Salt Lake by Mr. Spry."

The crowd, along with Knight, then marched back to the theater, in which Knight rejected a car ride by judge Powers, a previous democratic nominee for congress, and instead opted to walk along with the crowd and shake hands. Arriving back at the theater, the nomination was offered to J. William Knight, in which he accepted, and gave a speech emphasizing the national democratic platform, supporting presidential nominee William Jennings Bryan, supporting public schools and industrial growth, and declaring that he will "not be partisan In executing the law of the state." After his speech, his father, Jesse Knight, then came onto the stage. Before the Democratic chairman was even halfway into introducing him, the audience was already shouting "Uncle Jesse" until the audience "exhausted its breath." Jesse Knight, in bouts of cheers from the audience, bore "testimony" that "Jesse William Knight will make you a much better governor than I would have made."

== Third-party nominations ==
The American Party, an anti-Mormonism party formed in September 1904 from angry supporters of Thomas Kerns after he was ousted as a senator due to Reed Smoot, nominated judge John A. Street. Their main issues centered on removing church influence from state politics, with their 1908 platform stating "In short, we condemn the church commercialism which crushes out individual effort and deprives men of their rights to a free field trade." Their platform mainly criticized Republicans, and pointed to their inaction on allegations of people practicing polygamy.

== Campaign ==
Labor, anti-trust sentiment, tariffs, personality, and LDS influence in politics were all major issues of the campaign. William Knight and state Democrats campaigned on policies in favor of the "working men," as well as anti-trust legalization. Knight positioned himself as an outsider to politics, compared to Spry who had been a part of Republican party politics for more than a decade, and campaigned on William Jennings Bryan's national platform, as well as his business experience. On the American Party and LDS issue, Democrats accused Republicans of fearmongering Mormon-Democrats to vote Republican in fears of an American Party victory, and called for an end to pre-justice and to promote peace in Utah politics. Republicans were also accused of running as a corrupt political machine. Democrats, like previous elections, were underfunded.

Spry was presented as a calm, level headed business man, and campaigned on agriculture, with promises of full investment into the State Agricultural College if he became governor. Spry also campaigned across the state, traveling to the southern portions of Utah, and campaigned on William Taft's polices. Republicans, like in 1904, gained favor from Mormon voters due to anti-Mormon sentiment from the American Party, and benefited from would-be democratic voters voting for the American Party.

A false article was printed stating that John A. Street would be dropping out of the race and endorsing William Knight, but this was debunked and Street remained on the American ticket.

William Spry would go on to win the election with 47.30% of the vote against J. William Knight's 38.78% of the vote. John A. Street would take 10.26% of the vote, up nearly 2.5 points from American Party nominee William Ferry Jr's total in 1904 at 7.82%. Spry's total would be 2.7 points less than John C. Cutler's victory amount at nearly 50% of the vote in 1904. Knight improved on James Moyle's 1904 performance at 37.40% by nearly 1.4 points. Notably, Knight did very well in Juab County, the location of the Tintic Smelter, and Knightsville, a now ghost-town named after and run by Jesse Knight, his father. Knight took 52.3% of Juab's vote compared Spry's 39.5%.

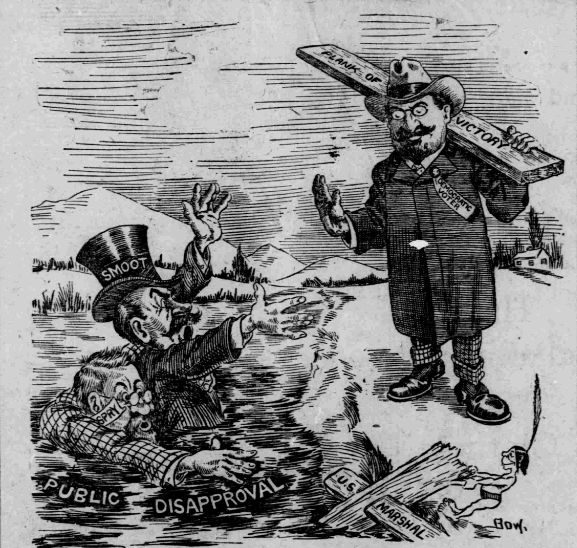
A pro-Democratic cartoon featuring Republican candidate Spry and Senator Reed Smoot

== General election ==
=== Candidates ===
Major party candidates

- William Spry, Republican
- Jesse William Knight, Democratic

Other candidates

- John A. Street, American
- V. R. Bohman, Socialist

=== Results ===
1908 Utah gubernatorial election (Note: Some sources give the totals as Spry 52,913; Knight 43,266; Street 11,404; and Bohman 3,936. These figures come the 1908 Secretary of State's report. However, the original handwritten canvass, held at the state archives in Salt Lake City, gives different totals (except for Spry) which were widely reported in newspapers of the day and also in the report of the state Bureau of Statistics, headed by the State Auditor. The differences are primarily in Salt Lake County but the Secretary of State's report contains several typos that lead to different results.)
Party	Candidate	Votes	%	±%
Republican	William Spry	52,913	47.30%	−2.67%
Democratic	Jesse William Knight	43,375	38.78%	+1.38%
American	John A. Street	11,472	10.26%	+2.43%
Socialist	V. R. Bohman	4,095	3.66%	−1.15%
Total votes		111,855	100.00%	
Plurality		9,538	8.53%	
Republican hold		Swing	-4.04%	

=== Results by county ===
County	William Spry Republican		Jesse William Knight Democratic		John A. Street American		V. R. Bohman Socialist		Margin		Total votes cast
County	#	%	#	%	#	%	#	%	#	%	Total votes cast
Beaver	879	52.20%	742	44.06%	39	2.32%	24	1.43%	137	8.14%	1,684
Box Elder	2,242	57.90%	1,531	39.54%	60	1.55%	39	1.01%	711	18.36%	3,872
Cache	3,576	49.74%	3,532	49.12%	32	0.45%	50	0.70%	44	0.61%	7,190
Carbon	831	48.94%	761	44.82%	24	1.41%	82	4.83%	70	4.12%	1,698
Davis	1,627	52.33%	1,419	45.64%	33	1.06%	30	0.96%	208	6.69%	3,109
Emery	988	49.15%	830	41.29%	42	2.09%	150	7.46%	158	7.86%	2,010
Garfield	708	66.86%	307	28.99%	4	0.38%	40	3.78%	401	37.87%	1,059
Grand	220	46.32%	226	47.58%	12	2.53%	17	3.58%	-6	-1.26%	475
Iron	686	53.14%	522	40.43%	8	0.62%	75	5.81%	164	12.70%	1,291
Juab	1,318	39.53%	1,744	52.31%	24	0.72%	248	7.44%	-426	-12.78%	3,334
Kane	395	76.11%	122	23.51%	0	0.00%	2	0.39%	273	52.60%	519
Millard	890	48.74%	861	47.15%	42	2.30%	33	1.81%	29	1.59%	1,826
Morgan	457	54.02%	328	38.77%	0	0.00%	61	7.21%	129	15.25%	846
Piute	292	52.05%	177	31.55%	9	1.60%	83	14.80%	115	20.50%	561
Rich	409	58.60%	272	38.97%	13	1.86%	4	0.57%	137	19.63%	698
Salt Lake	16,920	43.31%	10,407	26.64%	10,189	26.08%	1,549	3.97%	6,513	16.67%	39,065
San Juan	127	50.00%	125	49.21%	0	0.00%	2	0.79%	2	0.79%	254
Sanpete	2,988	51.70%	2,620	45.33%	62	1.07%	110	1.90%	368	6.37%	5,780
Sevier	1,526	47.19%	1,514	46.82%	30	0.93%	164	5.07%	12	0.37%	3,234
Summit	1,316	41.58%	1,535	48.50%	192	6.07%	122	3.85%	-219	-6.92%	3,165
Tooele	966	48.79%	930	46.97%	29	1.46%	55	2.78%	36	1.82%	1,980
Uintah	717	44.65%	720	44.83%	40	2.49%	129	8.03%	-3	-0.19%	1,606
Utah	5,297	45.72%	5,936	51.23%	134	1.16%	220	1.90%	-639	-5.51%	11,587
Wasatch	1,077	45.81%	1,157	49.21%	31	1.32%	86	3.66%	-80	-3.40%	2,351
Washington	713	45.88%	835	53.73%	2	0.13%	4	0.26%	-122	-7.85%	1,554
Wayne	258	46.57%	202	36.46%	0	0.00%	94	16.97%	56	10.11%	554
Weber	5,490	52.02%	4,020	38.09%	421	3.99%	622	5.89%	1,470	13.93%	10,553
Total	52,913	47.30%	43,375	38.78%	11,472	10.26%	4,095	3.66%	9,538	8.53%	111,855

==== Counties that flipped from Republican to Democratic ====
- Grand
- Summit
- Uintah
- Utah
- Wasatch

== Aftermath ==
Spry gave a statement after his win, stating "I am very well satisfied with the result. It Is an evidence that the people are satisfied to continue the era of prosperity which they enjoyed under Republican administrations." The Utah legislature would also keep its Republican majority, ensuring the re-election of Reed Smoot.

Spry's first term would involve funding the construction of the Utah capital building, which the legislature at first denied, but it would move forward in 1911 when the state received $798,546 in inheritance taxes from the estate of the late multimillionaire Edward H. Harriman. During his administration, legislation would be enacted prohibiting child labor and the sale or distribution of tobacco products to minors, the construction of an armory for the National Guard, and the creation of a state road commission. He also led a successful fight to defeat ratification by Utah of the federal income tax amendment. Calling Utah's tax system "ludicrous," Spry campaigned for reform, but voters rejected constitutional amendments drafted by the legislature in 1912. Prohibition would also complicate his first term, when in 1909 Republican legislators blocked one dry bill and Spry vetoed another. Spry would sign a local option bill in 1911 and vetoed another statewide prohibition bill in 1915, but the move undoubtedly cost him the nomination in 1916 for a future third term.
