= 1900 Utah gubernatorial election =

- November 6, 1900
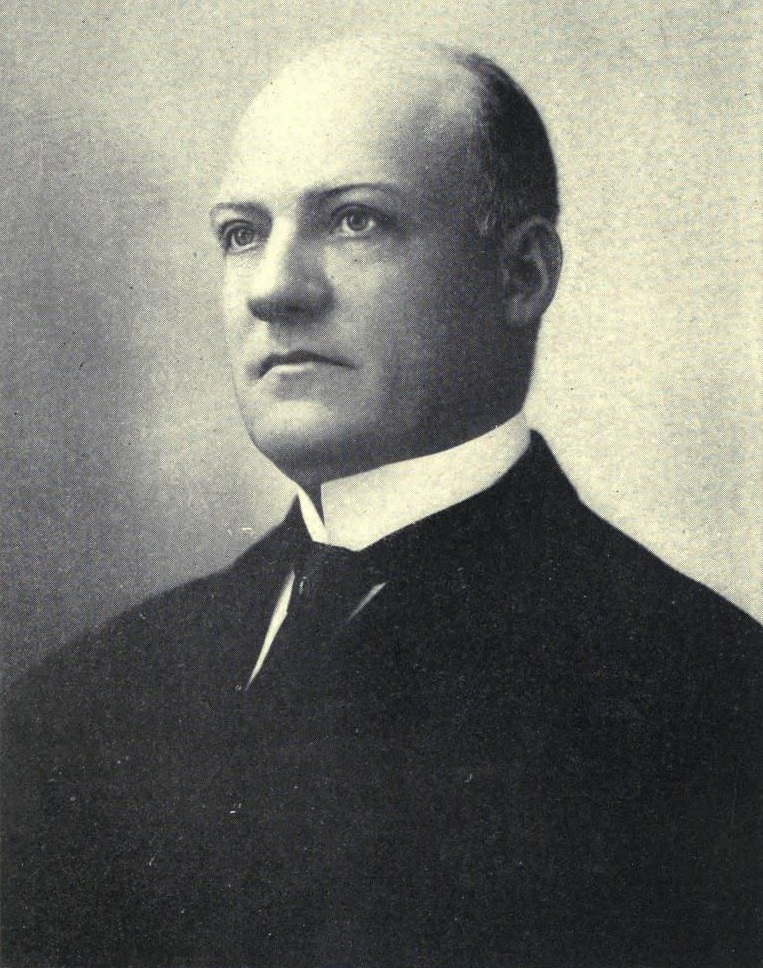

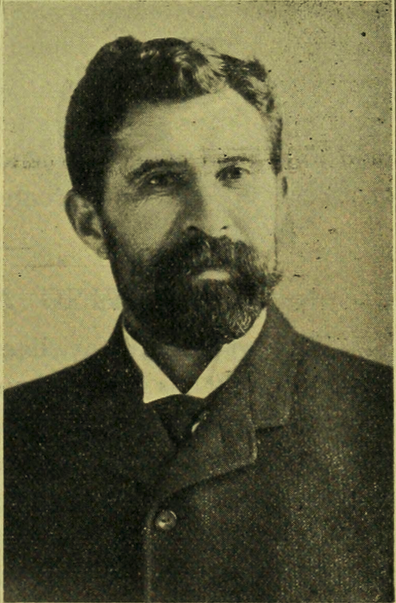
Nominee	Heber M. Wells	James H. Moyle
Party	Republican	Democratic
Popular vote	40,209	37,152
Percentage	51.19%	47.80%
- County results Wells: 50–60% 70–80% 90–100% Moyle : 50–60% 90–100%
Governor before election
Heber M. Wells
Republican
Elected Governor
Heber M. Wells
Republican

The 1900 Utah gubernatorial election was held on November 6, 1900. Incumbent Republican Heber M. Wells defeated Democratic nominee James H. Moyle with 51.98% of the vote.

== Republican nomination ==
Heber M. Wells, the first incumbent governor of the state of Utah, ran and was nominated for a second term at the Republican State Convention on September 4, 1900. Wells's and the state Republican's party's platform mirrored the national Republican platform, led by incumbent president William McKinley. They praised the president for his policies, toned down the fears of a low money supply, and accused the Democrats for being the true "anti-silver" party for choosing anti-silver vice president, Adlai Stevenson I, even though Stevenson was pro-silver.

== Democratic nomination ==
On September 7, the Democrats nominated James H. Moyle, founder of the Utah Democratic Party, attorney, and territorial house representative, at a rather quiet convention. Moyle was popular with both Mormons and non-Mormons, and the party's platform centered on free-silver, lower tariffs, anti-trust legislation

== Campaign ==
The campaign heavily centered around the free silver movement, which handed presidential candidate William Jennings Bryan a landslide victory in the state in 1896, as well as labor, trusts, tariffs, and international politics due to the US's conquest of both Cuba and the Philippines.

Campaigning didn't take place until the last few days of the election, October 31 to November 6, in which Utah newspapers covered dozens of events each day. The Democrats accused Wells of being against free silver, as well as accusing him of wanting to get national bank notes accepted as money, thus ruining silver mining. Republicans accused Democrats of being populist, and just throwing "free silver" around as a way to catch votes. Republicans did not believe free silver would lead to prosperity, but still favored some action in favor of it anyway. Generally, state Republicans did follow many Democratic policies, but claimed they were the ones that actually got said policies passed.

On the topic of the Philippines, Governor Wells praised the work of volunteers who fought in the Philippines in Manti, and claimed for a way to preserve their sacrifice was to vote Republican. State Republicans further capitalized on the issue by holding a rally with both Philippines and Civil war veterans in Salt Lake City. Multiple generals spoke in favor of US expansion in the Philippines, accused Adlai Stevenson I of being a copperhead, and blamed Democrats for being hostile to the nation. Major F.A. Grant was quoted saying, "we ought not to let the tears of the mothers of those boys of ours who died in the Philippines be shed in vain." At the same rally, a black soldier, J Gordon McPherson, made a speech comparing the freeing of African Americans in the Civil War to the liberation of the Cuban people in the Caribbean. However, he claimed that the Filipino people "stabbed their friends in the back" for not wanting to be liberated. State Republicans successfully tied the Civil War and the Philippine issue together for emotional appeal. The Democrats, on the other hand, did not rely heavily on the Philippines issue due to criticisms in the form patriotic pleas, but Moyle still argued against US imperialism in the region as "evil".

On labor, Wells was criticized for vetoing an eight hour work day bill, and state labor organizations refused to back his campaign. He defended himself by stating the bill only affected state and county employees, and that the bill came so late in the session he could not give it proper time to look it over. He also brought up the passage of a similar law that gave miners and smelters eight hour works days, and if another similar bill appeared on his desk, he would sign it. Moyle was reported to have taken the "labor question" for a rally at an opera house in Park City, and gave a speech on why he was for the "working man."

Wells and other Republican candidates ended their campaigns at a Park City rally at the Dewey Theatre, where he spoke generally on local Issues, as well as giving the "true history" explaining his veto of an early eight hour work law, and reviewing Republican legislation. Meanwhile, Democrats concluded their campaign with a rally in Brigham City, were Moyle was given high remarks by Brigham Henry Roberts.

Governor Wells would go on to defeat Moyle with 51% of the vote to Moyle's 48%, a margin of slightly over 3 points; a slight decrease compared to his 5.6 point victory in 1895. His victory, as well as President William McKinley's victory, has been attributed to the good organization and funding of the Utah Republican Party, as well as his position on protective tariffs and support of the conquest of the Philippines.

== General election ==
=== Candidates ===
- Heber M. Wells, Republican
- James H. Moyle, Democratic
- Martin Wright, Social Democratic
- Jacob S. Boreman, Prohibition
- P. E. Nelson, Socialist Labor

=== Results ===
1900 Utah gubernatorial election
Party	Candidate	Votes	%	±%
Republican	Heber M. Wells	47,600	51.19%	+0.88%
Democratic	James H. Moyle	44,447	47.80%	+3.07%
Social Democratic	Martin Wright	641	0.69%	
Prohibition	Jacob S. Boreman	207	0.22%	
Socialist Labor	P. E. Nelson	85	0.09%	
Total votes		92,890	100.00%	
Majority		3,153	3.39%	
Republican hold		Swing	-2.20%	

=== Results by county ===
County	Heber M. Wells Republican		John T. Caine Democratic		Martin Wright Socialist		Jacob S. Boreman Prohibition		P. E. Nelson Socialist Labor		Margin		Total votes cast
County	#	%	#	%	#	%	#	%	#	%	#	%	Total votes cast
Beaver	681	52.06%	624	47.71%	3	0.23%	0	0.00%	0	0.00%	57	4.36%	1,308
Box Elder	1,646	52.74%	1,466	46.97%	4	0.13%	5	0.16%	0	0.00%	180	5.77%	3,121
Cache	2,894	48.81%	2,996	50.53%	35	0.59%	4	0.07%	0	0.00%	-102	-1.72%	5,929
Carbon	752	54.53%	619	44.89%	5	0.36%	1	0.07%	2	0.15%	133	9.64%	1,379
Davis	1,215	46.13%	1,407	53.42%	5	0.19%	5	0.19%	2	0.08%	-192	-7.29%	2,634
Emery	667	45.44%	796	54.22%	3	0.20%	2	0.14%	0	0.00%	-129	-8.79%	1,468
Garfield	645	61.96%	396	38.04%	0	0.00%	0	0.00%	0	0.00%	249	23.92%	1,041
Grand	182	47.40%	201	52.34%	1	0.26%	0	0.00%	0	0.00%	-19	-4.95%	384
Iron	647	48.39%	689	51.53%	1	0.07%	0	0.00%	0	0.00%	-42	-3.14%	1,337
Juab	1,576	43.97%	1,937	54.05%	66	1.84%	2	0.06%	3	0.08%	-361	-10.07%	3,584
Kane	390	70.14%	166	29.86%	0	0.00%	0	0.00%	0	0.00%	224	40.29%	556
Millard	949	53.11%	835	46.73%	3	0.17%	0	0.00%	0	0.00%	114	6.38%	1,787
Morgan	403	53.03%	357	46.97%	0	0.00%	0	0.00%	0	0.00%	46	6.05%	760
Piute	330	54.55%	272	44.96%	1	0.17%	1	0.17%	1	0.17%	58	9.59%	605
Rich	382	57.01%	288	42.99%	0	0.00%	0	0.00%	0	0.00%	94	14.03%	670
Salt Lake	13,591	50.61%	12,763	47.53%	350	1.30%	82	0.31%	66	0.25%	828	3.08%	26,852
San Juan	88	56.05%	66	42.04%	0	0.00%	3	1.91%	0	0.00%	22	14.01%	157
Sanpete	3,559	59.03%	2,444	40.54%	19	0.32%	5	0.08%	2	0.03%	1,115	18.49%	6,029
Sevier	1,583	55.00%	1,265	43.95%	26	0.90%	3	0.10%	1	0.03%	318	11.05%	2,878
Summit	1,655	49.65%	1,669	50.08%	7	0.21%	2	0.06%	0	0.00%	-14	-0.42%	3,333
Tooele	1,296	54.23%	1,082	45.27%	11	0.46%	1	0.04%	0	0.00%	214	8.95%	2,390
Uintah	661	46.71%	752	53.14%	1	0.07%	1	0.07%	0	0.00%	-91	-6.43%	1,415
Utah	5,678	50.92%	5,389	48.33%	60	0.54%	21	0.19%	3	0.03%	289	2.59%	11,151
Wasatch	740	49.07%	765	50.72%	2	0.13%	1	0.07%	0	0.00%	-25	-1.66%	1,508
Washington	414	29.36%	994	70.50%	2	0.14%	0	0.00%	0	0.00%	-580	-41.13%	1,410
Wayne	326	53.62%	282	46.38%	0	0.00%	0	0.00%	0	0.00%	44	7.24%	608
Weber	4,650	53.53%	3,927	45.21%	36	0.41%	68	0.78%	5	0.06%	723	8.32%	8,686
Total	47,600	51.19%	44,447	47.80%	641	0.69%	207	0.22%	85	0.09%	3,153	3.39%	92,980

==== Counties that flipped from Democratic to Republican ====
- Rich
- San Juan
- Utah
- Wayne

==== Counties that flipped from Republican to Democratic ====
- Grand
- Iron
- Juab
- Summit

== Aftermath ==
Wells's second term would involve major legalization, including establishing the School of Mines at the University of Utah and a State Bureau of Statistics, setting standards for dairy products and other foods, and accepting provisions of the federal Carey Act. He would also send the National Guard to Carbon County during the Carbon County Strike upon (false) reports that violence would break out, a costly move that required the state to borrow money, and upset strikers who saw the guard as protecting the company's property, rather than keeping the peace. Moyle would run again for governor in 1904, as would Wells, but the latter would lose the Republican nomination to John C. Cutler, due to party opposition from a group called the "Federal Bunch." Moyle would lose to Cutler in the general election.
