= 1912 Utah gubernatorial election =

- November 5, 1912
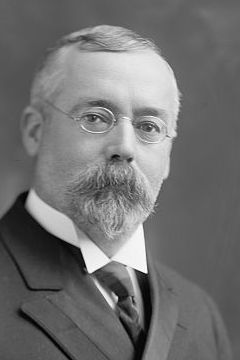

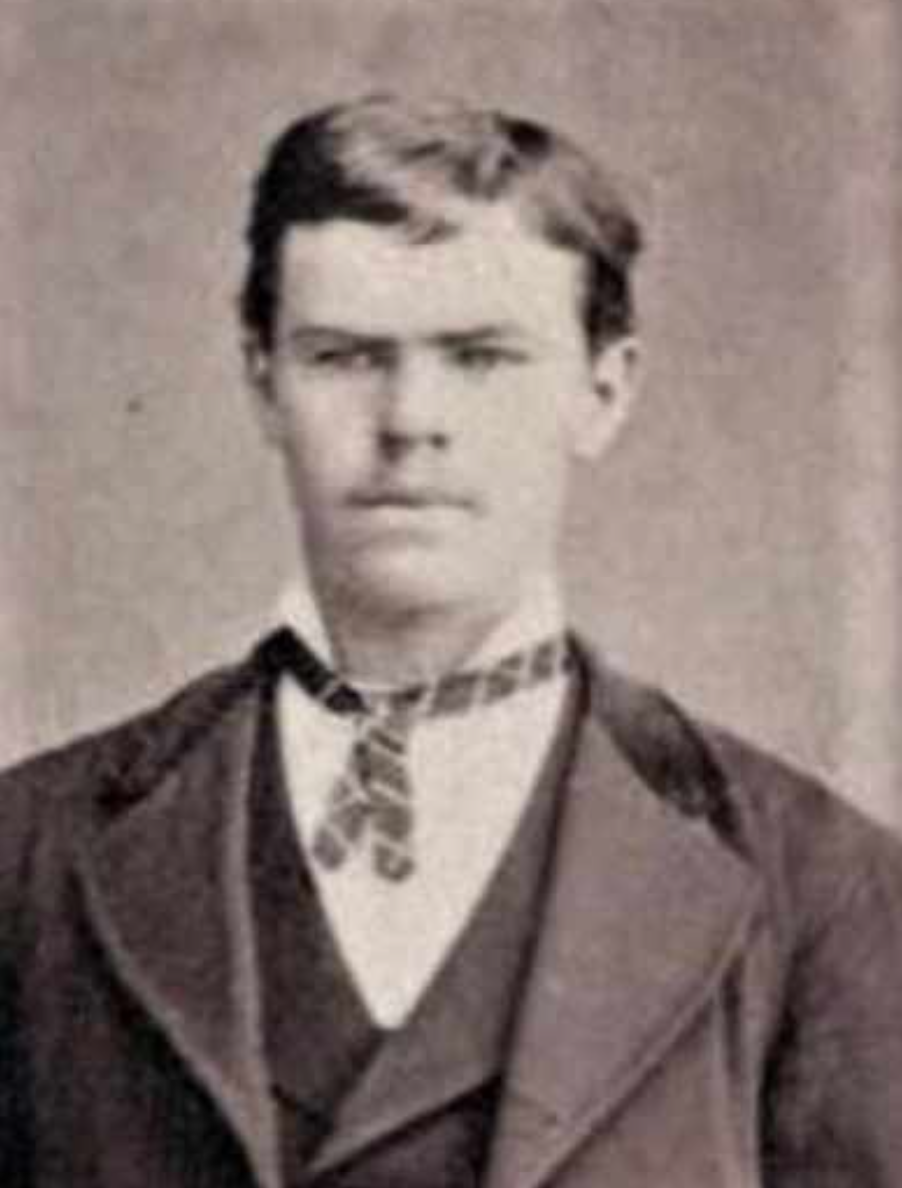

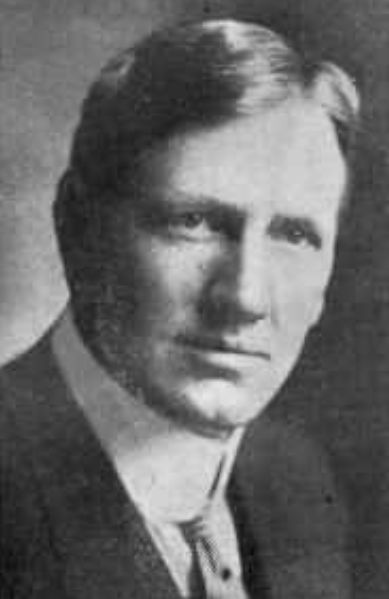

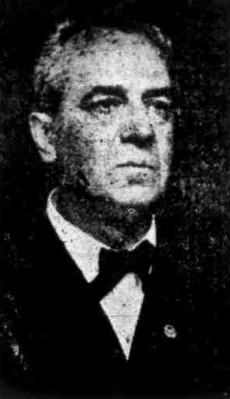
Nominee	William Spry	John Franklin Tolton
Party	Republican	Democratic
Popular vote	42,552	36,076
Percentage	38.17%	32.36%
Nominee	Nephi L. Morris	Homer P. Burt
Party	Progressive	Socialist
Popular vote	23,590	8,797
Percentage	21.16%	7.89%
- County results Spry: 30–40% 40–50% 50–60% 60–70% Tolton: 30–40% 40–50% 50–60% Morris: 30–40%
Governor before election
William Spry
Republican
Elected Governor
William Spry
Republican

The 1912 Utah gubernatorial election was held on November 5, 1912. Incumbent Republican William Spry defeated Democratic nominee John Franklin Tolton with 38.17% of the vote against his 32.36% in a four-way race, with Progressive nominee Nephi L. Morris winning 21.16% of the vote, and Socialist nominee Homer P. Burt winning 7.89% of the vote.

== Background ==
In 1912, the Republican party had split between incumbent President William Taft and former president Theodore Roosevelt. Roosevelt and other progressive Republicans were dissatisfied with Taft and the conservative wing of the party, and Roosevelt challenged him for the nomination. Taft ultimately was given the nomination, resulting in Roosevelt forming his own party, the Progressive Party, or popularly known as the Bull Moose Party, in response. The new party resulted in hundreds of local office seekers running as Progressives, including Nephi L. Morris for Utah's governor seat. The Socialist Party of America ran Homer P. Burt for governor, ultimately resulting in a four-way race.

== Republican nomination ==
William Spry, the incumbent Republican governor, was re-nominated with no real opposition against him on September 5, noticeably with no members of the "Federal Bunch," a group of powerful federal-level state Republicans, among the delegates. The Bunch effectively ousted previous governor John C. Cutler by removing their support for him, causing him to withdraw from the primary, and instead supported William Spry in 1908.

== Democratic nomination ==
Democrats nominated John F. Tolton of Beaver. Considered a dark horse for the nomination, he was largely supported by southern county delegates. Will R. Wallace, while considered the lead contender for the nomination, dropped out before the delegates voted, leaving C. C. Richards and T. N. Talyor leading the first ballot. By the third ballot, however, southern county delegates had generated enough support for Tolton that he won on the fourth ballot with 379 delegates, and won the nomination with acclaim.

== Progressive nomination ==
The Progressives nominated business man, stake president, former Republican state legislator, and KSL radio speaker (nicked name "Air Morris") Nephi L. Morris for governor on September 13. Morris's name was constantly suggested and often talked about in progressive-Republican circles prior to the convention due to his public appearances, leading to Morris personally feeling like the nomination was thrust upon him, and he only accepted due to a sense of duty.

Before the nominations began during the convention, party leaders debated whether to begin at all until expected guest Theodore Roosevelt, the "Bull Moose" himself, arrived, who ended up being two hours late. Debate continued until Judge Hiles, the permanent chairmen of the party, arrived, and the nominations took place after Hiles gave a speech. In his acceptance speech, Morris stated that he "could no longer conscientiously affiliate with the local or national Republican party because of its sins of omission and commission." After Morris and several other nominations were made, the delegates "grew restless" waiting for Roosevelt, and in the fear that he would leave town without seeing them, raced to the doors and to twenty-fifth street to great the former president. After the president arrived and was greeted, he gave a speech detailing the reasons for the Bull Moose Party, as well as denouncing big party bosses and "crooks." The delegates then had dinner and returned to finish the rest of the nomination process.

== Socialist nomination ==
The Socialist Party of America nominated Homer P. Burt, member of the Stationary Engineers Union and the SPA's state party chair, for governor on July 24. According to delegates, the convention was "by far the most successful Utah socialists have ever held." It was reported that the SPA's organization in the state was in "far better shape" than ever before as well. Most delegates came from socialist dominated towns, such as "Murray, Eureka, Mammoth, Tintic, and other towns..."

== Campaign ==
Republicans had so far won every gubernatorial election since Utah became a state in 1895, and had voted for the Republican presidential candidate every time except for the 1896 election, when federal Republicans were once seen as anti-Mormon and hostile to the popular idea of free silver. However, with the election of LDS apostle Reed Smoot as a senator in 1902, a powerful Republican political machine spawned under him, with and other federal-level Republican's being named the "Federal Bunch" for their powerful positions and their influence in the state's party. Combined with creation of the anti-Mormon party in 1904, the American Party, Republicans quickly became the favorite for LDS members, and Democrats gradually lost power after 1900, and never regained state control going into 1912. Republican's also enjoyed relative popularity in the state in 1912 due to a strong economy in farming and mining, and their position on protectionist tariffs

Alongside the focus on national politics and the Republican split between the Progressives and the Conservatives in the party, the race centered on tariffs, progressive policies, LDS influence in state politics, and the candidate's personalities and background.

State Republicans praised Taft as the only logical candidate for Utah for his handling of tariffs and the prospering economy. Spry repeated those claims and road the party's popularity. Like in 1908, Spry was presented as a level headed businessman and politically astute. Spry was criticized from Democrats and Progressives for allegations of misusing state funds, as well as colluding with railway companies, and using illegal voting procedures. Democrats ran stories in pro-democrat newspapers claiming that Republicans were committing voting fraud and using church influence to win the election. Republican's pushed back against the claims, while claiming Tolton and Morris were not fit for office.

Tolton and state Democrats ran on the "inefficiency" of Taft, berated the state Republicans for their machine politics, pointed to the allegations of misused state funds, and advocated for better health, safety, and labor laws, as well as moving tariffs down.

== General election ==
=== Candidates ===
Major party candidates

- William Spry, Republican
- John Franklin Tolton, Democratic

Other candidates

- Nephi L. Morris, Progressive
- Homer P. Burt, Socialist
- E. A. Battell, Socialist Labor

=== Results ===
1912 Utah gubernatorial election
Party	Candidate	Votes	%	±%
Republican	William Spry (incumbent)	42,552	38.17%	−0.61%
Democratic	John Franklin Tolton	36,076	32.36%	−14.95%
Progressive	Nephi L. Morris	23,590	21.16%	
Socialist	Homer P. Burt	8,797	7.89%	+4.23%
Socialist Labor	E. A. Battell	479	0.43%	
Total votes		111,494	100.00%	
Plurality		6,476	5.81%	
Republican hold		Swing	-2.72%	

=== Results by county ===
County	William Spry Republican		John Franklin Tolton Democratic		Nephi L. Morris Progressive		Homer P. Burt Socialist		E. A. Battell Socialist Labor		Margin		Total votes cast
County	#	%	#	%	#	%	#	%	#	%	#	%	Total votes cast
Beaver	432	25.53%	990	58.51%	185	10.93%	84	4.96%	1	0.06%	-558	-32.98%	1,692
Box Elder	1,404	34.90%	1,371	34.08%	1,190	29.58%	58	1.44%	0	0.00%	33	0.82%	4,023
Cache	2,849	38.35%	3,158	42.51%	1,275	17.16%	129	1.74%	18	0.24%	-309	-4.16%	7,429
Carbon	862	40.58%	446	21.00%	471	22.18%	338	15.91%	7	0.33%	391 (Note: Spry's margin over Morris)	18.41%	2,124
Davis	1.282	43.98%	1.135	38.94%	477	16.36%	20	0.69%	1	0.03%	147	5.04%	2,915
Emery	859	42.36%	759	37.43%	224	11.05%	181	8.93%	5	0.25%	100	4.93%	2,028
Garfield	596	55.86%	339	31.77%	107	10.03%	23	2.16%	2	0.19%	257	24.09%	1,067
Grand	236	41.19%	214	37.35%	86	15.01%	37	6.46%	0	0.00%	22	3.84%	573
Iron	656	47.47%	605	43.78%	37	2.68%	83	6.01%	1	0.07%	51	3.69%	1,382
Juab	1,168	35.59%	970	29.56%	330	10.05%	803	24.47%	11	0.34%	198	6.03%	3,282
Kane	395	69.54%	161	28.35%	7	1.23%	5	0.88%	0	0.00%	234	41.20%	568
Millard	847	37.17%	1,084	47.56%	249	10.93%	96	4.21%	3	0.13%	-237	-10.40%	2,279
Morgan	323	37.47%	218	25.29%	278	32.25%	43	4.99%	0	0.00%	45	5.22%	862
Piute	175	34.18%	149	29.10%	113	22.07%	75	14.65%	0	0.00%	26	5.08%	512
Rich	326	48.30%	245	36.30%	99	14.67%	5	0.74%	0	0.00%	81	12.00%	675
Salt Lake	13,592	37.65%	9,746	27.00%	8,657	23.98%	3,808	10.55%	294	0.81%	3,846	10.65%	36,097
San Juan	155	41.11%	164	43.50%	55	14.59%	3	0.80%	0	0.00%	-9	-2.39%	377
Sanpete	2,312	39.21%	2,032	34.46%	1,380	23.40%	164	2.78%	9	0.15%	280	4.75%	5,897
Sevier	1,351	40.03%	902	26.73%	858	25.42%	258	7.67%	5	0.15%	449	13.30%	3,375
Summit	1,328	45.87%	957	33.06%	391	13.51%	215	7.43%	4	0.14%	371	12.82%	2,895
Tooele	1,006	47.14%	619	29.01%	224	10.50%	277	12.98%	8	0.37%	387	18.13%	2,134
Uintah	547	28.58%	564	29.47%	644	33.65%	157	8.20%	2	0.10%	-80 (Note: Morris's margin over Tolton)	-4.18%	1,914
Utah	4,170	35.80%	4,374	37.55%	2,441	20.96%	635	5.45%	27	0.23%	-204	-1.75%	11,647
Wasatch	1,252	44.12%	924	32.56%	373	13.14%	281	9.90%	8	0.28%	328	11.56%	2,838
Washington	739	45.48%	833	51.26%	47	2.89%	5	0.31%	1	0.06%	-94	-5.78%	1,625
Wayne	266	49.17%	200	36.97%	22	4.07%	53	9.80%	0	0.00%	66	12.20%	541
Weber	3,424	31.87%	2,917	27.15%	3,370	31.37%	960	8.94%	72	0.67%	54	0.50%	10,743
Total	42,552	38.17%	36,076	32.36%	23,590	21.16%	8,797	7.89%	264	0.43%	6,476	5.81%	111,494

==== Counties that flipped from Democratic to Republican ====
- Grand
- Juab
- Summit
- Wasatch

==== Counties that flipped from Republican to Democratic ====
- Beaver
- Cache
- Millard
- San Juan

==== Counties that flipped from Democratic to Progressive ====
- Uintah
