= Moyle (surname) =

Moyle is a Celtic surname that derives from maol meaning bald. It has been suggested that the surname arises in at least two ways: first, meaning "shaven one" or "tonsured", as in a religious person or a locality near a religious site; and second, a dweller on or near a bald hill.

Notable people who share the surname include:

== Arts and entertainment ==
- Allan Moyle (born 1947), Canadian film director
- Franny Moyle (born 1964), British television producer and author
- Sarah Moyle (born 1969), English stage and television actor

== Politics ==
- Arthur Moyle, Baron Moyle (1894–1974), British trade unionist and politician
- Colin Moyle (1929–2024), New Zealand politician
- Edna Moyle (1942–2013), Caymanian politician
- Henry Vivian Moyle (1841–1925), South Australian politician
- James Moyle (1858–1946), American politician
- Joseph Moyle (17th–18th century), Member of Parliament from the UK constituency of Saltash
- Mike Moyle (born 1964), American politician
- Roland Moyle (1928–2017), British politician
- Sir Thomas Moyle (1488–1560), English politician
- Walter Moyle (1672–1721), English politician and political writer
- Walter Moyle (MP) (1627–1701), English politician

== Sports ==
- Brett Moyle (born 1980), Australian rules footballer
- Graeme Moyle (born 1954), Australian rules footballer
- Herbert Moyle (1922–2000), New Zealand cricketer
- Jamie Moyle (born 1989), American mixed martial artist
- Kendra Moyle (born 1990), American skater
- Nolan Moyle (born 1999), American ice hockey player
- Wallace Moyle (1867–1920), American college sports coach

== Other people ==
- Alice Marshall Moyle (1908-2005), Australian ethnomusicologist
- Henry D. Moyle (1889–1963), American Mormon leader
- Jennifer Moyle (1921–2016), British biochemist
- John Moyle (politician) (1591–1661), High Sheriff of Cornwall
- John Moyle, first editor of the magazine Electronics Australia
- John Moyle (British Army officer) (died 1738), captain in the Royal Regiment of Ireland
- John R. Moyle (1808–1889), Mormon pioneer
- Jonathan Moyle (died 1990), RAF helicopter pilot and magazine editor
- Matthew Paul Moyle (1788–1880), Cornish meteorologist and writer on mining
- Michael Moyle (magistrate), Isle of Man High Bailiff
- Olin R. Moyle (1887–1966), American Jehovah's Witnesses legal counsel
- Peter B. Moyle (born 1942), zoologist and associate director of the Center for Watershed Sciences at the University of California-Davis
- Richard M. Moyle (born 1944), New Zealand academic specialising in ethnomusicology of the Pacific and Australia
- Walter Moyle (judge) (c. 1405 – 1479), Justice of the Common Pleas, England and Wales

== See also ==
- John Moyle (disambiguation)
- Moyle (disambiguation)
- Moyles (disambiguation)
