= List of United States governors born outside the United States =

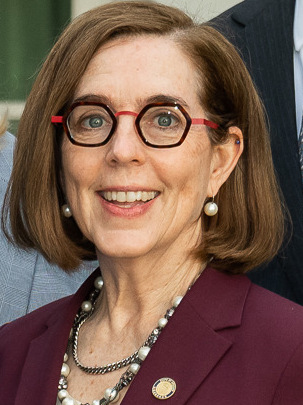
Kate Brown, Governor of Oregon from February 2015 to 2023, was born in Spain, making her the second most recent U.S. governor who was born outside the United States. Her father was an American citizen serving there in the United States Air Force.

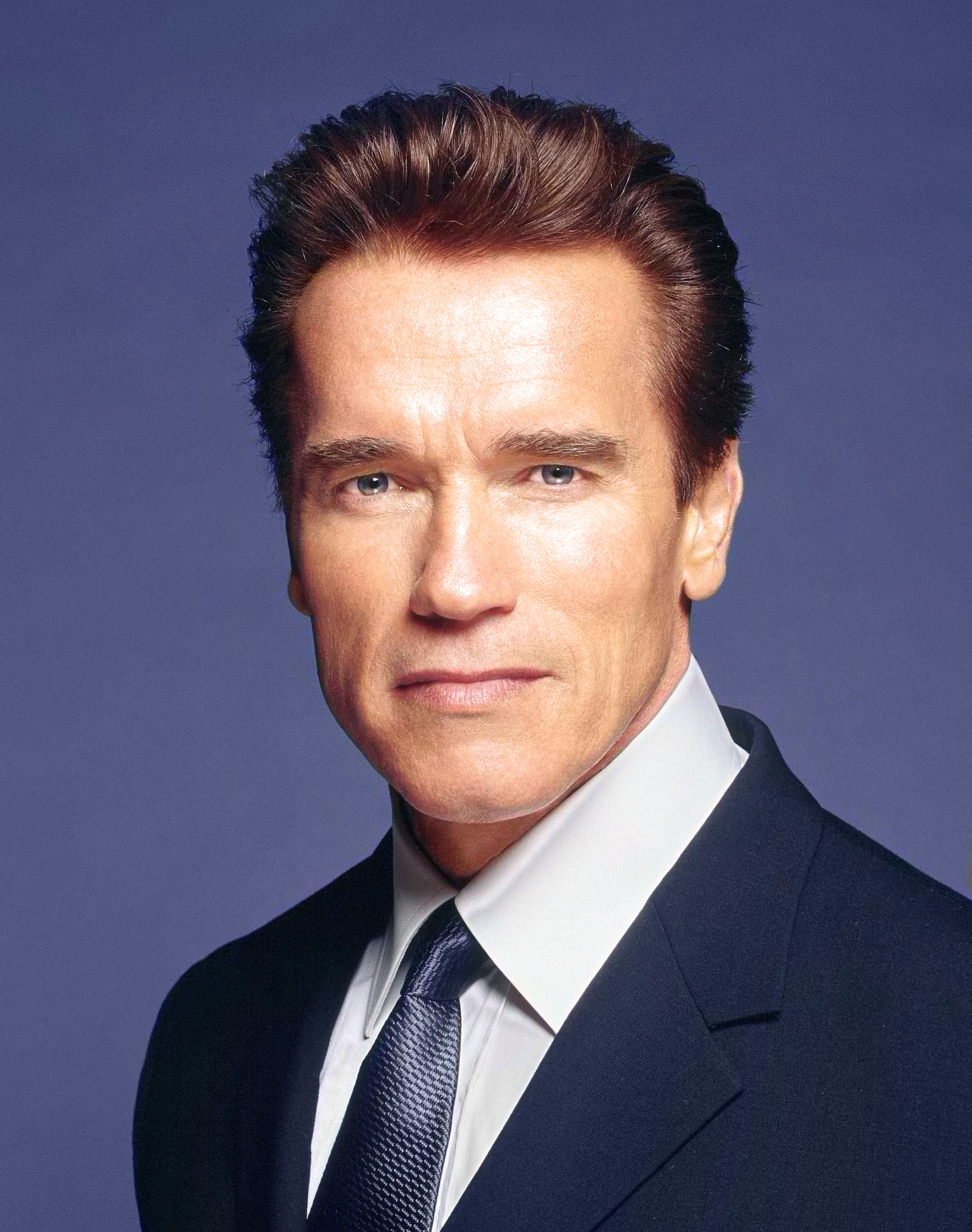
Arnold Schwarzenegger, Governor of California from 2003 to 2011, born in Austria, is the third most recent U.S. governor to have been born outside of the country.

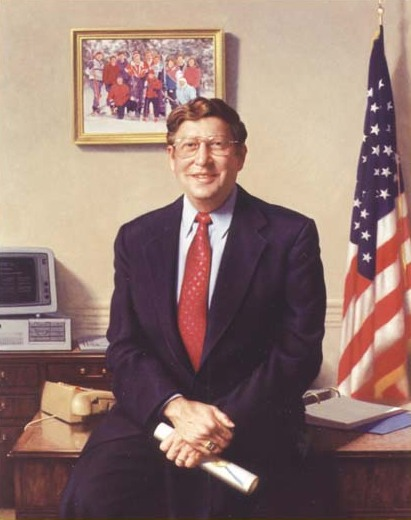
John H. Sununu, Governor of New Hampshire from 1983 to 1989, was the first U.S. governor who was born in the Caribbean.

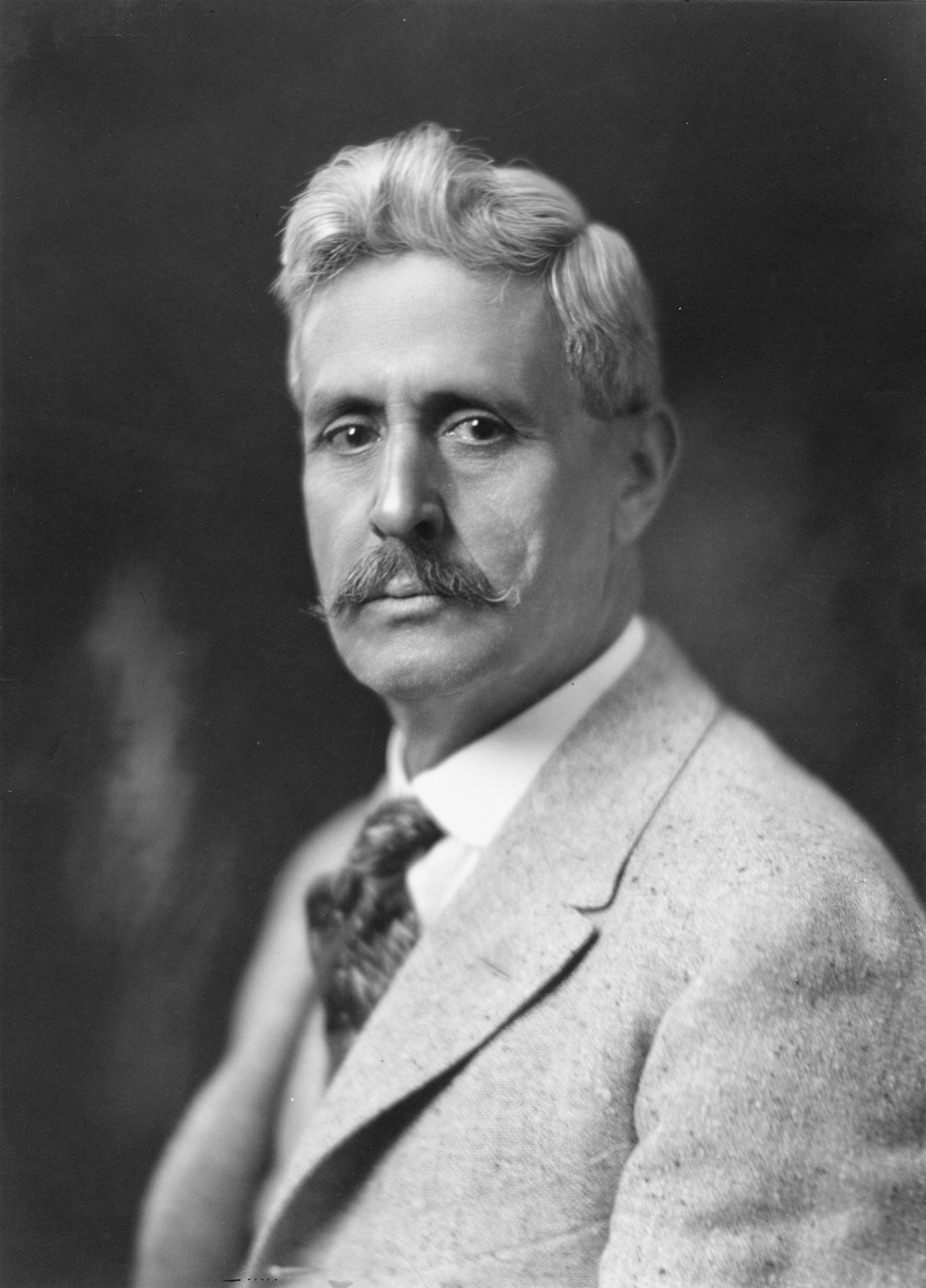
Octaviano Larrazolo, Governor of New Mexico from 1919-1921, was the first U.S. governor born in Latin America.

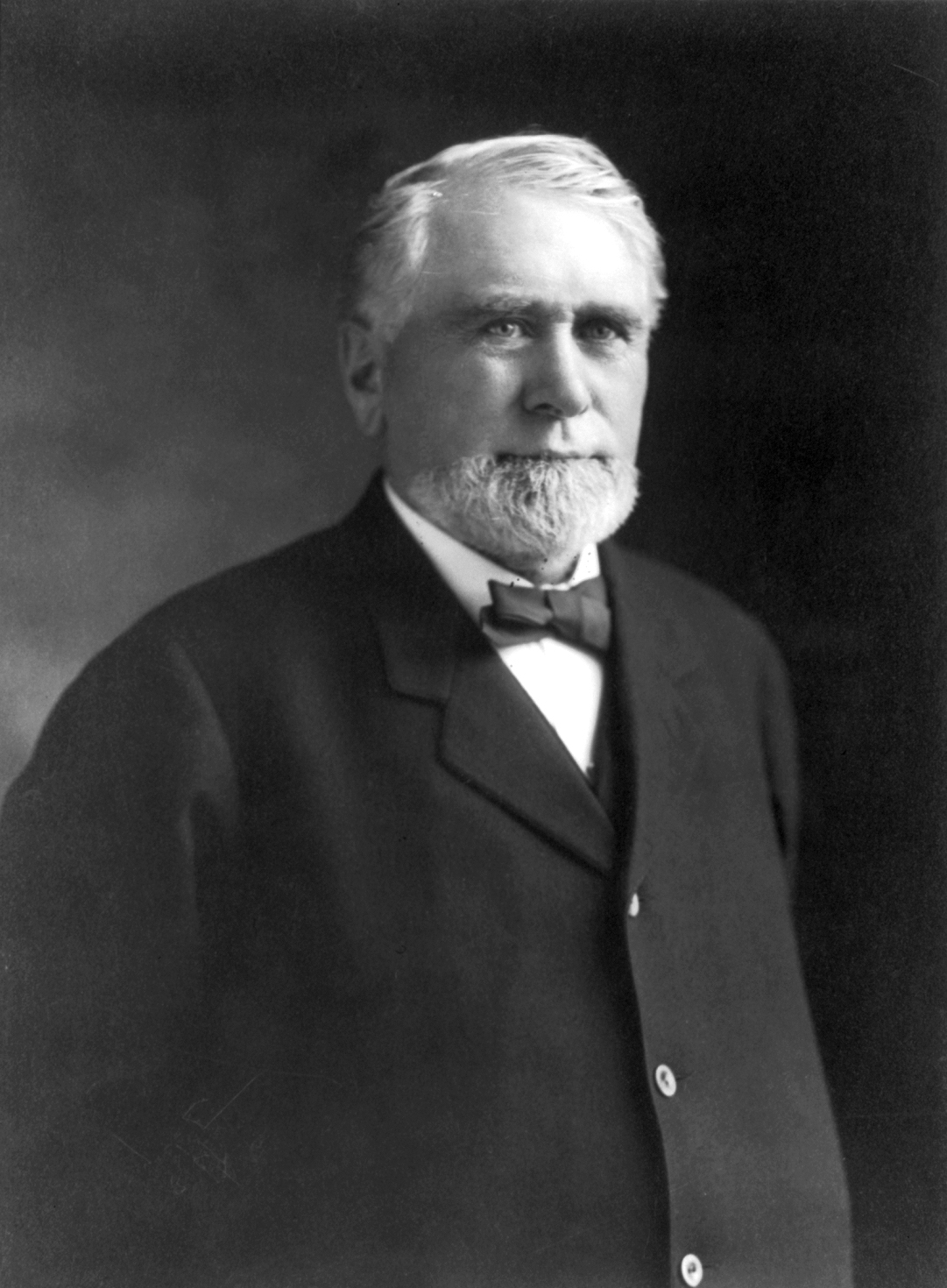
Knute Nelson, Governor of Minnesota from 1893 to 1895, was the first U.S. governor who was born in Scandinavia.

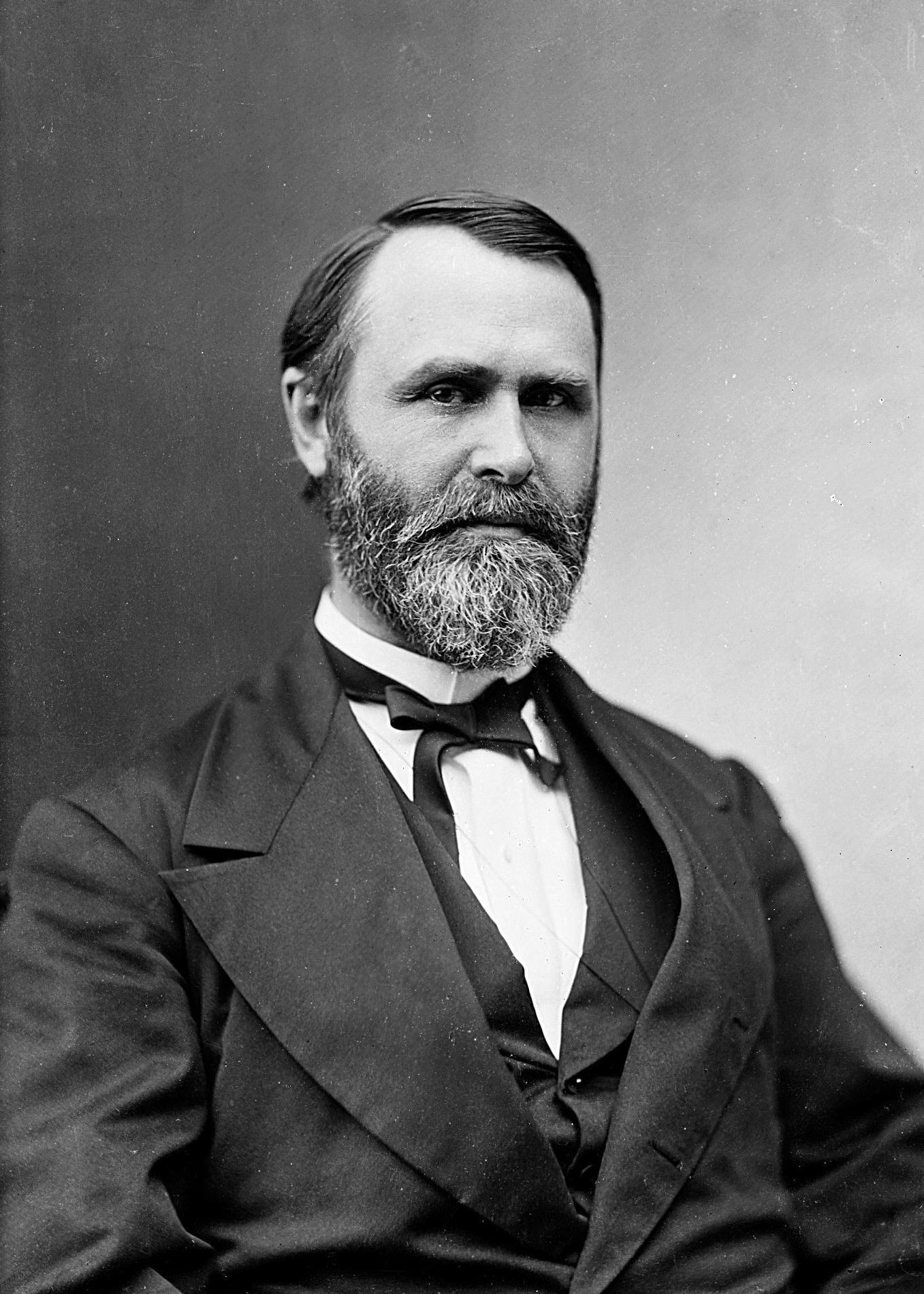
Jacob Dolson Cox, Governor of Ohio from 1866 to 1868, was the first U.S. governor who was born outside the United States, but still within the Americas.

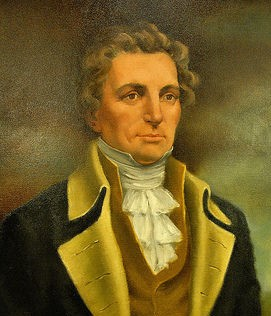
John A. Treutlen, Governor of Georgia from 1777 to 1778, was the first U.S. governor who was born in a non-English-speaking country.

In total, 72 governors of U.S. states have been born outside the current territory of the United States. Joe Lombardo of Nevada, born in Japan, is the only current governor to have been born outside the United States. Arnold Schwarzenegger of California, Jennifer Granholm of Michigan (whose terms both ended in January 2011), and Kate Brown of Oregon (whose term ended in January 2023) are the other most recent foreign-born governors.

Of the fifty states, 30 (or 60 percent) have had at least one governor born outside the United States. 19 states have had multiple governors who were born outside the United States. Georgia has had six foreign-born governors, who all served in office during the 18th century. The other states with the most foreign-born governors are Wisconsin (five), Michigan, Minnesota, North Dakota, Ohio, and Oregon (four each). Additionally, from 1905 to 1921 Utah had three consecutive foreign-born governors (John Cutler, William Spry, and Simon Bamberger).

Of the 78 foreign-born governors, 59 were born in Europe and thirteen were born in North America, including the Caribbean. A total of 30 U.S. governors have been born on the present territory of the United Kingdom of Great Britain and Northern Ireland (fifteen in England, seven in Scotland, six in Northern Ireland, and two in Wales), with another 2 born on territory of the Republic of Ireland while part of the United Kingdom of Great Britain and Ireland, and 2 while part of the pre-union Kingdom of Ireland. Nine governors have been born within the present territory of Canada, seven Germany, five Norway, five Sweden, three France, three Mexico, and one Austria.

Only three foreign-born women have served as U.S. governors – Madeleine Kunin of Vermont, who was born in Switzerland; Jennifer Granholm of Michigan, who was born in Canada; and Kate Brown of Oregon, who was born in Spain.

== List ==
=== 18th century ===
Governors who were succeeded by other foreign-born governors are marked with a dagger (†). Governors who were preceded by other foreign-born governors are marked with a section sign (§).

Name	State	Birthplace (current country)	Then the territory of	Term start	Term end
John McKinly	Delaware	United Kingdom	Kingdom of Ireland	February 12, 1777	September 22, 1777
Button Gwinnett^{†}	Georgia	United Kingdom	Kingdom of Great Britain	March 4, 1777	May 8, 1777
John A. Treutlen^{§}	Georgia	Germany	Holy Roman Empire	May 8, 1777	January 10, 1778
Rawlins Lowndes	South Carolina	Saint Kitts and Nevis	United Kingdom	March 6, 1778	January 9, 1779
John Wereat	Georgia	United Kingdom	Kingdom of Great Britain	August 6, 1779	January 4, 1780
William Fleming	Virginia	United Kingdom	Kingdom of Great Britain	June 4, 1781	June 12, 1781
Thomas Burke	North Carolina	Ireland	Kingdom of Ireland	June 26, 1781	April 22, 1782
Edward Telfair	Georgia	United Kingdom	Kingdom of Great Britain	January 9, 1786	January 9, 1787
Edward Telfair	Georgia	United Kingdom	Kingdom of Great Britain	November 11, 1789	November 7, 1793
Samuel Johnston	North Carolina	United Kingdom	Kingdom of Great Britain	December 20, 1787	December 17, 1789
George Handley	Georgia	United Kingdom	Kingdom of Great Britain	January 7, 1788	January 7, 1789
William Paterson	New Jersey	United Kingdom	Kingdom of Ireland	October 29, 1790	March 30, 1793
James Jackson	Georgia	United Kingdom	Kingdom of Great Britain	January 12, 1798	March 3, 1801
William Richardson Davie	North Carolina	United Kingdom	Kingdom of Great Britain	December 7, 1798	November 23, 1799

=== 19th century ===
Governors who were succeeded by other foreign-born governors are marked with a dagger (†). Governors who were preceded by other foreign-born governors are marked with a section sign (§).

Name	State	Birthplace (current country)	Then the territory of	Term start	Term end
Edward Tiffin^{†}	Ohio	United Kingdom	Kingdom of Great Britain	March 3, 1803	March 4, 1807
Thomas Kirker^{§}	Ohio	United Kingdom	Kingdom of Ireland	March 4, 1807	December 12, 1808
David Brydie Mitchell	Georgia	United Kingdom	Kingdom of Great Britain	November 10, 1809	November 5, 1813
Henry Middleton	South Carolina	United Kingdom	Kingdom of Great Britain	December 8, 1810	December 10, 1812
Pierre Derbigny	Louisiana	France	Kingdom of France	December 15, 1828	October 6, 1829
Arthur MacArthur Sr.	Wisconsin	United Kingdom	United Kingdom of Great Britain and Ireland	March 21, 1856	March 25, 1856
John G. Downey	California	Ireland	United Kingdom of Great Britain and Ireland	January 14, 1860	January 10, 1862
Edward Salomon	Wisconsin	Germany	Kingdom of Prussia	April 19, 1862	January 4, 1864
Michael Hahn	Louisiana	Germany	Kingdom of Bavaria	March 4, 1864	March 4, 1865
Jacob D. Cox	Ohio	Canada	British Empire	January 8, 1866	January 13, 1868
Robert B. Lindsay	Alabama	United Kingdom	United Kingdom of Great Britain and Ireland	November 26, 1870	November 17, 1872
Thomas L. Young	Ohio	United Kingdom	United Kingdom of Great Britain and Ireland	March 2, 1877	January 14, 1878
William E. Smith	Wisconsin	United Kingdom	United Kingdom of Great Britain and Ireland	January 7, 1878	January 2, 1882
George P. Wetmore	Rhode Island	United Kingdom	United Kingdom of Great Britain and Ireland	May 26, 1885	May 29, 1887
Frank Bell	Nevada	Canada	British Empire	September 21, 1890	January 5, 1891
James E. Boyd	Nebraska	United Kingdom	United Kingdom of Great Britain and Ireland	January 8, 1891	January 13, 1893
Knute Nelson	Minnesota	Norway	United Kingdoms of Sweden and Norway	January 4, 1893	January 31, 1895
John Peter Altgeld	Illinois	Germany	Nassau	January 10, 1893	January 11, 1897
Frederic T. Greenhalge	Massachusetts	United Kingdom	United Kingdom of Great Britain and Ireland	January 4, 1894	March 5, 1896
John Edward Jones^{†}	Nevada	United Kingdom	United Kingdom of Great Britain and Ireland	January 7, 1895	April 10, 1896
Roger Allin	North Dakota	United Kingdom	United Kingdom of Great Britain and Ireland	January 10, 1895	January 6, 1897
Reinhold Sadler^{§}	Nevada	Poland	Kingdom of Prussia	April 10, 1896	January 5, 1903
Josiah Grout	Vermont	Canada	British Empire	October 8, 1896	October 6, 1898
Andrew E. Lee	South Dakota	Norway	United Kingdoms of Sweden and Norway	January 1, 1897	January 8, 1901
John Lind	Minnesota	Sweden	United Kingdoms of Sweden and Norway	January 2, 1899	January 7, 1901

=== 20th century ===
Governors who were succeeded by other foreign-born governors are marked with a dagger (†). Governors who were preceded by other foreign-born governors are marked with a section sign (§).

Name	State	Birthplace (current country)	Then the territory of	Term start	Term end
Fred M. Warner	Michigan	United Kingdom	United Kingdom of Great Britain and Ireland	January 1, 1905	January 2, 1911
John Christopher Cutler^{†}	Utah	United Kingdom	United Kingdom of Great Britain and Ireland	January 2, 1905	January 4, 1909
Frank R. Gooding	Idaho	United Kingdom	United Kingdom of Great Britain and Ireland	January 2, 1905	January 4, 1909
John McLane	New Hampshire	United Kingdom	United Kingdom of Great Britain and Ireland	January 5, 1905	January 3, 1907
James O. Davidson	Wisconsin	Norway	United Kingdoms of Sweden and Norway	January 1, 1906	January 2, 1911
William Spry^{§†}	Utah	United Kingdom	United Kingdom of Great Britain and Ireland	January 4, 1909	January 1, 1917
Aram J. Pothier	Rhode Island	Canada	British Empire	January 5, 1909	January 5, 1915
Aram J. Pothier	Rhode Island	Canada	British Empire	January 6, 1925	February 4, 1928
Adolph Olson Eberhart	Minnesota	Sweden	United Kingdoms of Sweden and Norway	September 21, 1909	January 5, 1915
Oswald West^{†}	Oregon	Canada	British Empire	January 11, 1911	January 12, 1915
John K. Tener	Pennsylvania	United Kingdom	United Kingdom of Great Britain and Ireland	January 17, 1911	January 19, 1915
James Withycombe^{§}	Oregon	United Kingdom	United Kingdom of Great Britain and Ireland	January 12, 1915	March 3, 1919
Moses Alexander^{†}	Idaho	Germany	Kingdom of Bavaria	January 4, 1915	January 6, 1919
Simon Bamberger^{§}	Utah	Germany	Hesse-Darmstadt	January 1, 1917	January 3, 1921
Octaviano Ambrosio Larrazolo	New Mexico	Mexico	Mexico	January 1, 1919	January 1, 1921
D. W. Davis^{§}	Idaho	United Kingdom	United Kingdom of Great Britain and Ireland	January 6, 1919	January 1, 1923
Ragnvald Nestos	North Dakota	Norway	United Kingdoms of Sweden and Norway	November 23, 1921	January 7, 1925
Roland H. Hartley	Washington	Canada	British Empire	January 12, 1925	January 9, 1933
Albin Walter Norblad Sr.	Oregon	Sweden	United Kingdoms of Sweden and Norway	December 21, 1929	January 12, 1931
Frank Henry Cooney	Montana	Canada	British Empire	March 13, 1933	December 15, 1935
Walter Welford	North Dakota	United Kingdom	United Kingdom of Great Britain and Ireland	February 2, 1935	January 6, 1937
Hjalmar Petersen	Minnesota	Denmark	Denmark	August 22, 1936	January 4, 1937
Julius P. Heil	Wisconsin	Germany	German Empire	January 2, 1939	January 4, 1943
John Moses	North Dakota	Norway	United Kingdoms of Sweden and Norway	January 5, 1939	January 4, 1945
Sigurd Anderson	South Dakota	Norway	United Kingdoms of Sweden and Norway	January 2, 1951	January 4, 1955
Christian Herter	Massachusetts	France	French Third Republic	January 8, 1953	January 3, 1957
J. Hugo Aronson	Montana	Sweden	United Kingdoms of Sweden and Norway	January 5, 1953	January 2, 1961
Joseph B. Johnson	Vermont	Sweden	United Kingdoms of Sweden and Norway	January 6, 1955	January 8, 1959
John Swainson^{†}	Michigan	Canada	British Empire	January 1, 1961	January 1, 1963
John N. Dempsey	Connecticut	Ireland	United Kingdom of Great Britain and Ireland	January 21, 1961	January 6, 1971
George W. Romney^{§}	Michigan	Mexico	Mexico	January 1, 1963	January 22, 1969
Samuel Shapiro	Illinois	Estonia	Russian Empire	May 21, 1968	January 13, 1969
Raúl Héctor Castro	Arizona	Mexico	Mexico	January 6, 1975	October 20, 1977
John H. Sununu	New Hampshire	Cuba	Cuba	January 6, 1983	January 4, 1989
Madeleine Kunin	Vermont	Switzerland	Switzerland	January 10, 1985	January 10, 1991
Stan Stephens	Montana	Canada	British Empire	January 2, 1989	January 4, 1993
Lowell Weicker	Connecticut	France	French Third Republic	January 9, 1991	January 4, 1995

=== 21st century ===
Name	State	Birthplace (current country)	Then the territory of	Term start	Term end
Jennifer Granholm	Michigan	Canada	Canada	January 1, 2003	January 1, 2011
Arnold Schwarzenegger	California	Austria	(United Kingdom) Allied-occupied Austria	November 13, 2003	January 3, 2011
Kate Brown	Oregon	Spain	Spain	February 18, 2015	January 9, 2023
Joe Lombardo	Nevada	Japan	Japan	January 2, 2023	present

== By birthplace ==
Country	State or province	No. of governors
Austria	Styria	1
Canada	Alberta	1
Canada	British Columbia	1
Canada	Colony of New Brunswick	1
Canada	Ontario	4
Canada	Quebec	2
Canada	TOTAL	9
Cuba	Havana	1
Denmark	Zealand	1
Estonia		1
France	Hauts-de-France	1
France	Paris	2
France	TOTAL	3
Germany		7
Ireland		4
Japan	Sapporo	1
Mexico	Chihuahua	2
Mexico	Sonora	1
Mexico	TOTAL	3
Norway		5
Poland	Province of Posen	1
Spain	Community of Madrid	1
Sweden		5
Switzerland	Canton of Zürich	1
United Kingdom	England	15
United Kingdom	Northern Ireland	6
United Kingdom	Scotland	7
United Kingdom	Wales	2
United Kingdom	TOTAL	30

== By state ==
State	No. of governors
Alabama	1
Arizona	1
California	2
Connecticut	2
Delaware	1
Georgia	6
Idaho	3
Illinois	2
Louisiana	2
Massachusetts	2
Michigan	4
Minnesota	4
Montana	3
Nebraska	1
Nevada	4
New Hampshire	2
New Jersey	1
New Mexico	1
North Carolina	3
North Dakota	4
Ohio	4
Oregon	4
Pennsylvania	1
Rhode Island	2
South Dakota	1
Utah	3
Vermont	2
Virginia	1
Washington	1
Wisconsin	5

== See also ==
- List of current United States governors
- List of female governors in the United States
- List of minority governors and lieutenant governors in the United States
- List of United States senators born outside the United States
- Natural-born-citizen clause (United States)
