= 1904 Utah gubernatorial election =

- November 8, 1904
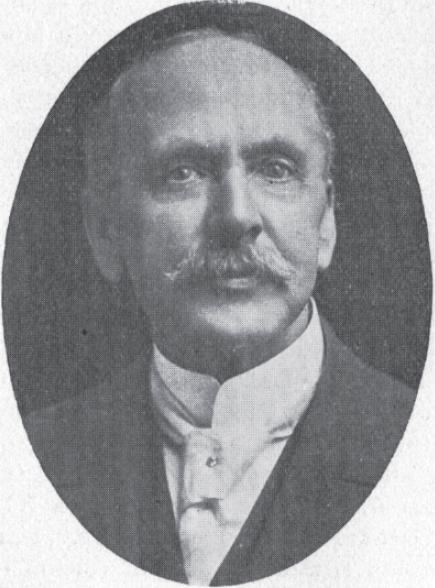

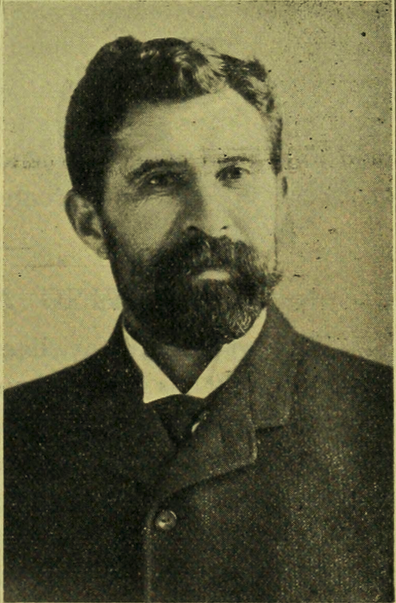

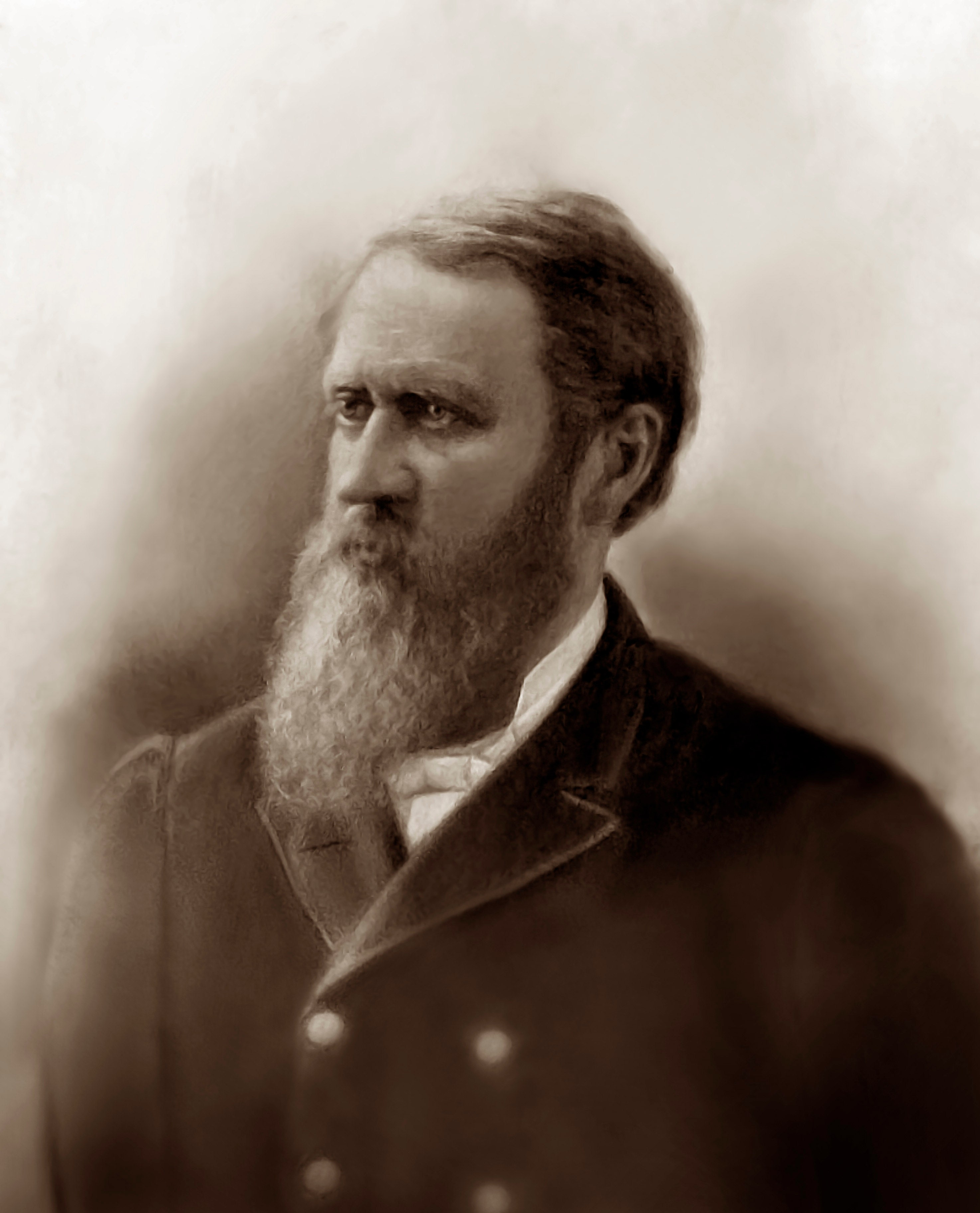
Nominee	John Christopher Cutler	James Moyle	William Montague Ferry Jr.
Party	Republican	Democratic	American
Popular vote	50,837	38,047	7,959
Percentage	49.97%	37.40%	7.82%
- County results Cutler: 40–50% 50–60% 60–70% 70–80% Moyle: 40–50% 50–60%
Governor before election
Heber Manning Wells
Republican
Elected Governor
John Christopher Cutler
Republican

The 1904 Utah gubernatorial election was held on November 8, 1904. Republican nominee John Christopher Cutler defeated Democratic nominee James Moyle with 49.97% of the vote.

== Republican nomination ==
Persuaded against running for a senate seat by state Republican Party leadership, incumbent governor Heber Wells decided to run for a third term as governor. However, a party revolt had spawned against him by a group called the "Federal Bunch." The Bunch was powerful group of Republicans, named as such because of patronage appointments many of them received, who were led by Utah Senator Reed Smoot, elected by the Utah legislature in 1902. John C. Cutler, a Salt Lake County Clerk and an officer of several banks and companies, was part of this group, and won their backing to challenge Wells in the primary. The party split into Cutler and Wells camps, and on the first convention ballot on August 25, Cutler secured 214 delegates compared to Wells's 196. A third candidate, James T. Hammond, had won 52 delegates, but then withdrew his name in support for Wells. Nevertheless, several of Hammonds delegates went to Cutler, pushing him over the needed 231 with 239, to Wells's 221 delegates, making him the nominee.

== Democratic nomination ==
In the Democratic convention, James Moyle, who ran for governor at the top of the ticket in 1900 and lost, was seen as the unmistakable favorite, and won the first ballot with 393 delegates.

== Third-party nominations ==
A new anti-Mormon political party formed in September 1904, created from angry Thomas Kerns supporters after Reed Smoot convinced the Utah legislature to oust him as senator in favor of George Sutherland. With a main policy of eliminating LDS influence in Utah politics, the new party ran William M. Ferry Jr, a Civil War veteran and a local politician in Michigan and Utah, for governor.

== Campaign ==
As in the previous gubernatorial election, the race centered on policies regarding tariffs, trusts, international politics, and labor, but LDS influence in state politics also took center stage.

On labor, Cutler was routinely criticized for allegations of employing women and children in "sweatshops" that were part of his businesses, something which he denied. Republicans defended their position on labor by stating that Cutler was a friend of labor, and that they were the only ones that passed legislation that hurt trusts.

As the United States formally took control of the Panama Canal in 1903, state Republicans praised Roosevelt's actions, as well as US rule in the Philippines.

Both parties praised previous governor Heber Wells. The Ogden Morning Examiner reported that Democratic congressional candidate Orlando W. Powers gave a tribute to the former governor at a rally, saying "He paid a fine tribute to the present Republican governor, Heber M. Well, but spoke disparagingly of the present nominee, John C. Cutler." However, Wells actively campaigned on behalf of Cutler and the state Republican party, despite being out voted in the primary. At a rally, Wells commended Cutler, saying "I shall feel it an honor to leave such a man as my successor. He will make you a good governor. He is a level headed business man and will give you a business like administration of state affairs."

State Republicans benefited from the strain of anti-Mormonism generated from anger at Republican Senator Smoot, and refuted claims that non-Mormons had been discriminated against. One claimed LDS Bishop even told Mormon Democrats to vote for Cutler, saying "If you vote for Brother Cutler.. you are carrying out the wishes of God revealed by wireless telegraphy to President Smith and down the line by way of Brother Smoot, Brother Spry and Bishop Winker, direct to you. Thus you get your politics straight from heaven without any trouble of thinking it out for yourself. Could anything be easier than that?" The state Democrats, on the other hand, ran on a planform of "political peace in Utah," and often accused the state Republican party of mudslinging regarding religious prejustice. Moyle himself commented during a speech on the "lies" and "discord" Republicans made.

State Republicans closed off their campaign at the Salt Lake Theater, with a large crowd in attendance. However, it was noted that Cutler or any other state candidate was not mentioned, with the speeches focused on praising the Roosevelt administration. Democrats closed their campaign in Park City at the Dewey Theater, were Moyle received praise from speaker Zach Lamar Cobb of Texas.

Cutler would go onto win the election with nearly 50% of the vote, compared to Moyle's 37.40% of the vote. American Party candidate William Ferry would take 7.82%. Cutler's victory would be 2 points less than Wells's victory in 1900, however, Moyle underperformed compared to his run in 1900, down 10.5 points from 48%. Cutler's victory would actually be on the low end compared to other Republican's in the state, such as President Roosevelt's win with 61.41%, and Attorney General Breeden, who was the leader on the Republican ticket beside judges and the president. So, while Moyle underperformed compared to his last election, he still lead the highest percentage for any other democrats on the ticket, including presidential nominee Alton B. Parker, who only won 32.86% of the vote.

== General election ==
=== Candidates ===
Major party candidates

- John Christopher Cutler, Republican
- James Moyle, Democratic

Other candidates

- William Montague Ferry, American
- Joseph A. Kauffman, Socialist

=== Results ===
1904 Utah gubernatorial election
Party	Candidate	Votes	%	±%
Republican	John C. Cutler	50,837	49.97%	−1.22%
Democratic	James H. Moyle	38,047	37.40%	−10.40%
American	William M. Ferry	7,959	7.82%	
Socialist	Joseph A. Kauffman	4,892	4.81%	+4.12%
Total votes		101,735	100.00%	
Plurality		12,790	12.57%	
Republican hold		Swing	+9.18%	

=== Results by county ===
County	John C. Cutler Republican		James H. Moyle Democratic		William M. Ferry American		Joseph A. Kauffman Socialist		Margin		Total votes cast
County	#	%	#	%	#	%	#	%	#	%	Total votes cast
Beaver	814	54.56%	636	42.63%	20	1.34%	22	1.47%	178	11.93%	1,492
Box Elder	2,194	61.27%	1,236	34.52%	114	3.18%	37	1.03%	958	26.75%	3,581
Cache	3,773	53.52%	3,160	44.82%	42	0.60%	75	1.06%	613	8.70%	7,050
Carbon	1,060	57.33%	662	35.80%	14	0.76%	113	6.11%	398	21.53%	1,849
Davis	1,476	50.17%	1,410	47.93%	34	1.16%	22	0.75%	66	2.24%	2,942
Emery	830	51.81%	652	40.70%	12	0.75%	108	6.74%	178	11.11%	1,602
Garfield	654	68.05%	271	28.20%	0	0.00%	36	3.75%	383	39.85%	961
Grand	235	51.31%	183	39.96%	9	1.97%	31	6.77%	52	11.35%	458
Iron	724	57.10%	470	37.07%	2	0.16%	72	5.68%	254	20.03%	1,268
Juab	1,291	41.60%	1,359	43.80%	98	3.16%	355	11.44%	-68	-2.19%	3,103
Kane	394	78.49%	107	21.31%	1	0.20%	0	0.00%	287	57.17%	502
Millard	869	51.54%	787	46.68%	26	1.54%	4	0.24%	82	4.86%	1,686
Morgan	485	56.33%	327	37.98%	1	0.12%	48	5.57%	158	18.35%	861
Piute	330	44.41%	247	33.24%	11	1.48%	155	20.86%	83	11.17%	743
Rich	415	60.67%	260	38.01%	9	1.32%	0	0.00%	155	22.66%	684
Salt Lake	13,051	40.76%	10,229	31.95%	6,597	20.60%	2,143	6.69%	2,822	8.81%	32,020
San Juan	119	70.00%	43	25.29%	8	4.71%	0	0.00%	76	44.71%	170
Sanpete	3,433	59.89%	2,074	36.18%	55	0.96%	170	2.97%	1,359	23.71%	5,732
Sevier	1,624	55.45%	1,036	35.37%	29	0.99%	240	8.19%	588	20.08%	2,929
Summit	1,811	47.15%	1,567	40.80%	255	6.64%	208	5.42%	244	6.35%	3,841
Tooele	1,143	56.17%	737	36.22%	67	3.29%	88	4.32%	406	19.95%	2,035
Uintah	718	48.19%	667	44.77%	1	0.07%	104	6.98%	51	3.42%	1,490
Utah	5,888	53.67%	4,712	42.95%	170	1.55%	201	1.83%	1,176	10.72%	10,971
Wasatch	951	55.58%	742	43.37%	4	0.23%	14	0.82%	209	12.22%	1,711
Washington	691	46.44%	793	53.29%	1	0.07%	3	0.20%	-102	-6.85%	1,488
Wayne	308	52.65%	252	43.08%	2	0.34%	23	3.93%	56	9.57%	585
Weber	5,556	55.67%	3,428	34.35%	377	3.78%	620	6.21%	2,128	21.32%	9,981
Total	50,837	49.97%	38,047	37.40%	7,959	7.82%	4,892	4.81%	12,790	12.57%	101,735

==== Counties that flipped from Democratic to Republican ====
- Cache
- Davis
- Emery
- Grand
- Iron
- Summit
- Uintah
- Wasatch

== Aftermath ==
Cutler's first term would see legislation and passed that founded Utah's juvenile court system, promoted investment in local industry, and established a registration of births and deaths by the state. He also advocated for the construction of a capital building, but the legislature refused to appropriate funds for the project. The legislature would also deny Cutler's request for an institution to care for handicapped individuals. Cutler would run for another term, but after losing support from Reed Smoot and the "Federal Bunch," he would decided to drop out and endorse William Spry, chairman of the Republican State Committee in 1904, and a former member of the Utah House of Representatives, in fears of splitting the party.
