= Moyles (disambiguation) =

Chris Moyles (born 1974) is an English radio and television presenter.

Moyles may also refer to:

== People ==
- Anthony Moyles (born 1976), an Irish Gaelic football coach and former player
- Jack Moyles (1913-1973), an American radio actor
- Michael Moyles, an Irish Gaelic football trainer and former player
- Padraic Moyles, a lead dancer in the show Riverdance

== Other uses ==
- Moyles Court, a manor house at Rockford, Hampshire and now Moyles Court School

== See also ==
- Moyle (disambiguation)
- Moyle (surname)
