= 1895 Utah gubernatorial election =

- November 5, 1895
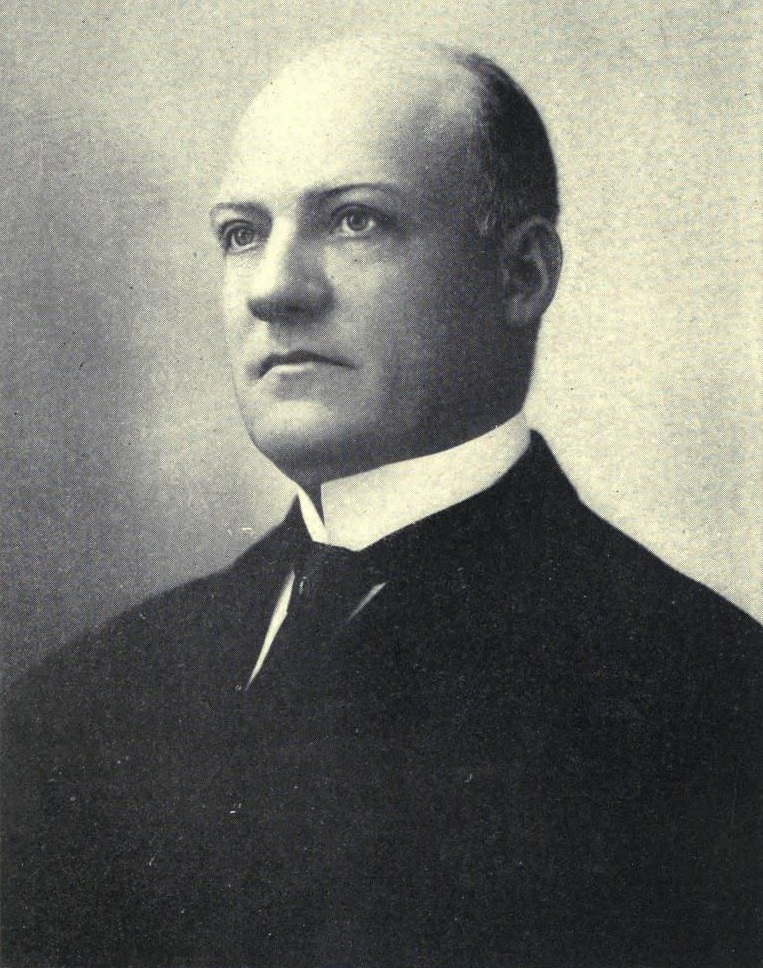

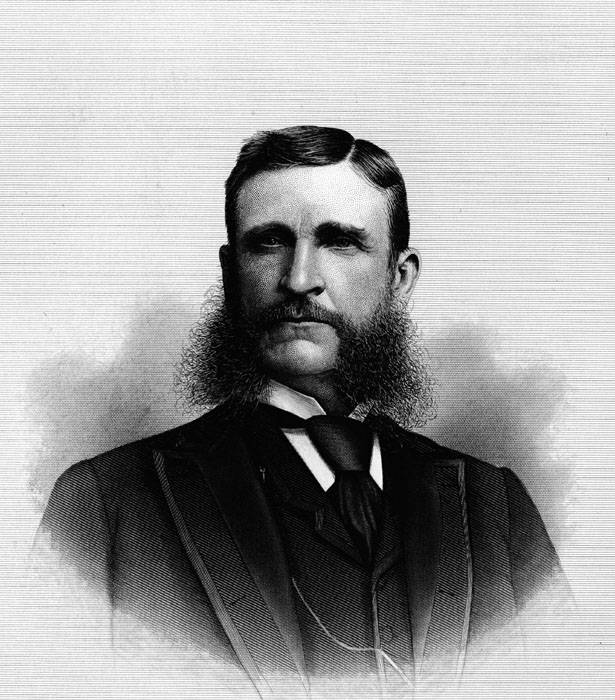
Nominee	Heber M. Wells	John T. Caine
Party	Republican	Democratic
Popular vote	20,833	18,519
Percentage	50.32%	44.73%
- County results Wells: 50–60% 60–70% 80–90% Caine: 40–50% 50–60% 60–70%
Elected Governor
Heber Manning Wells
Republican

The 1895 Utah gubernatorial election was held on November 5, 1895. It was the first gubernatorial election in the state of Utah and it was held before it became a state on the 4th of January, 1896, to set up the machinery for the new state. Republican Heber M. Wells defeated Democratic nominee John T. Caine with 50.32% of the vote. Wells' first term was to run for five years, until the next general election in 1900. Populist Henry W. Lawrence also ran, but only won 4.95% of the vote.

== Background ==
The Utah Territory had been granted statehood after a constitutional convention was held between March 4, 1895, to May 8, 1895. The territory had applied for statehood multiple times before, but the practice of polygamy among the Mormon population was one of the main reasons the federal government refused the proposals. In 1890, the LDS church banned the practice of polygamy in a new manifesto, paving the way for statehood. In 1892, Utah's non-voting representative Joseph L. Rawlins worked with Republicans and Democrats in congress to pass the Enabling Act, signed by the President Grover Cleveland in 1894, which allowed for the state to organize another constitutional convention for statehood the following year. After a constitution was approved by Utah's delegates, statewide elections were held in November in preparation for statehood on January 4, 1896.

Heber Manning Wells, a delegate to the Utah constitutional convention, and a previous tax collector and city recorder, ran for the Republican nomination against the party's chair Charles Crane and former territorial governor Arthur L. Thomas, and won. The Ogden Daily Standard reported that Crane was "defeated by those whom he trusted; by those in whom he believed; by those whom he had honored;..." As for Thomas, the Standard stated that he "...laid on the slaughter blocks and [got] completely annihilated. In fact he was not even considered as a possible candidate." John Thomas Caine, a former congressman who was instrumental in guiding Utah towards statehood, while also protecting the rights of polygamous Mormons, won the Democratic nomination.

The race centered on both men's personality, with Wells being seen as young, intelligent, progressive, and able to bring a fresh face for the new state, but was criticized for being inexperienced and attached to allegations about state Republican financial issues. Caine was seen as experienced, but being from the now old territory era, and being of older age, hurt him. The Salt Lake Tribune (in favor of Wells) and the Salt Lake Herald-Republican (in favor of Caine) both engaged in mud slinging against each other, and both believed it would either be a Republican or Democratic year before election day. Ultimately, it would be a Republican year, with Wells winning against Caine with 50.32% of the vote against his 44.73%, and Republicans taking control of the state legislature.

== General election ==
=== Candidates ===
- Heber M. Wells, Republican
- John T. Caine, Democratic
- Henry W. Lawrence, Populist

=== Results ===
1895 Utah gubernatorial election
Party	Candidate	Votes	%
Republican	Heber M. Wells	20,833	50.32%
Democratic	John T. Caine	18,519	44.73%
Populist	Henry W. Lawrence	2,051	4.95%
Total votes		41,403	100.00%
Majority		2,314	5.59%
Republican gain from Democratic			

=== By county ===
County	Heber M. Wells Republican		John T. Caine Democratic		Henry W. Lawrence Populist		Margin		Total votes cast
County	#	%	#	%	#	%	#	%	Total votes cast
Beaver	404	57.22%	300	42.49%	2	0.28%	104	14.73%	706
Box Elder	728	52.19%	663	47.53%	4	0.29%	65	4.66%	1,395
Cache	1,266	43.30%	1,626	55.61%	32	1.09%	-360	-12.31%	2,924
Carbon	301	65.15%	155	33.55%	6	1.30%	146	31.60%	462
Davis	424	39.11%	604	55.72%	56	5.17%	-180	-16.61%	1,084
Emery	315	44.18%	381	53.44%	17	2.38%	-66	-9.26%	713
Garfield	256	54.70%	212	45.30%	0	0.00%	44	9.40%	468
Grand	139	76.80%	31	17.13%	11	6.08%	108	59.67%	181
Iron	307	55.42%	247	44.58%	0	0.00%	60	10.83%	554
Juab	703	54.12%	456	35.10%	140	10.78%	247	19.01%	1,299
Kane	168	66.67%	84	33.33%	0	0.00%	84	33.33%	252
Millard	536	59.96%	350	39.15%	8	0.89%	186	20.81%	894
Morgan	213	53.25%	176	44.00%	11	2.75%	37	9.25%	400
Piute	161	50.63%	135	42.45%	22	6.92%	26	8.18%	318
Rich	159	46.90%	179	52.80%	1	0.29%	-20	-5.90%	339
Salt Lake	5,228	50.38%	4,118	39.68%	1,031	9.94%	1,110	10.70%	10,377
San Juan	37	38.14%	58	59.79%	2	2.06%	-21	-21.65%	97
Sanpete	1,559	52.54%	1,390	46.85%	18	0.61%	169	5.70%	2,967
Sevier	679	54.54%	559	44.90%	7	0.56%	120	9.64%	1,245
Summit	1,238	54.92%	835	37.05%	181	8.03%	403	17.88%	2,254
Tooele	530	60.30%	333	37.88%	16	1.82%	197	22.41%	879
Uintah	181	32.15%	245	43.52%	137	24.33%	-64	-11.37%	563
Utah	2,541	48.95%	2,544	49.01%	106	2.04%	-3	-0.06%	5,191
Wasatch	364	45.56%	431	53.94%	4	0.50%	-67	-8.39%	799
Washington	225	30.49%	510	69.11%	3	0.41%	-285	-38.62%	738
Wayne	123	40.73%	178	58.94%	1	0.33%	-55	-18.21%	302
Weber	2,048	51.17%	1,719	42.95%	235	5.87%	329	8.22%	4,002
Total	20,833	50.32%	18,519	44.73%	2,051	4.95%	2,314	5.59%	41,403

== Aftermath ==
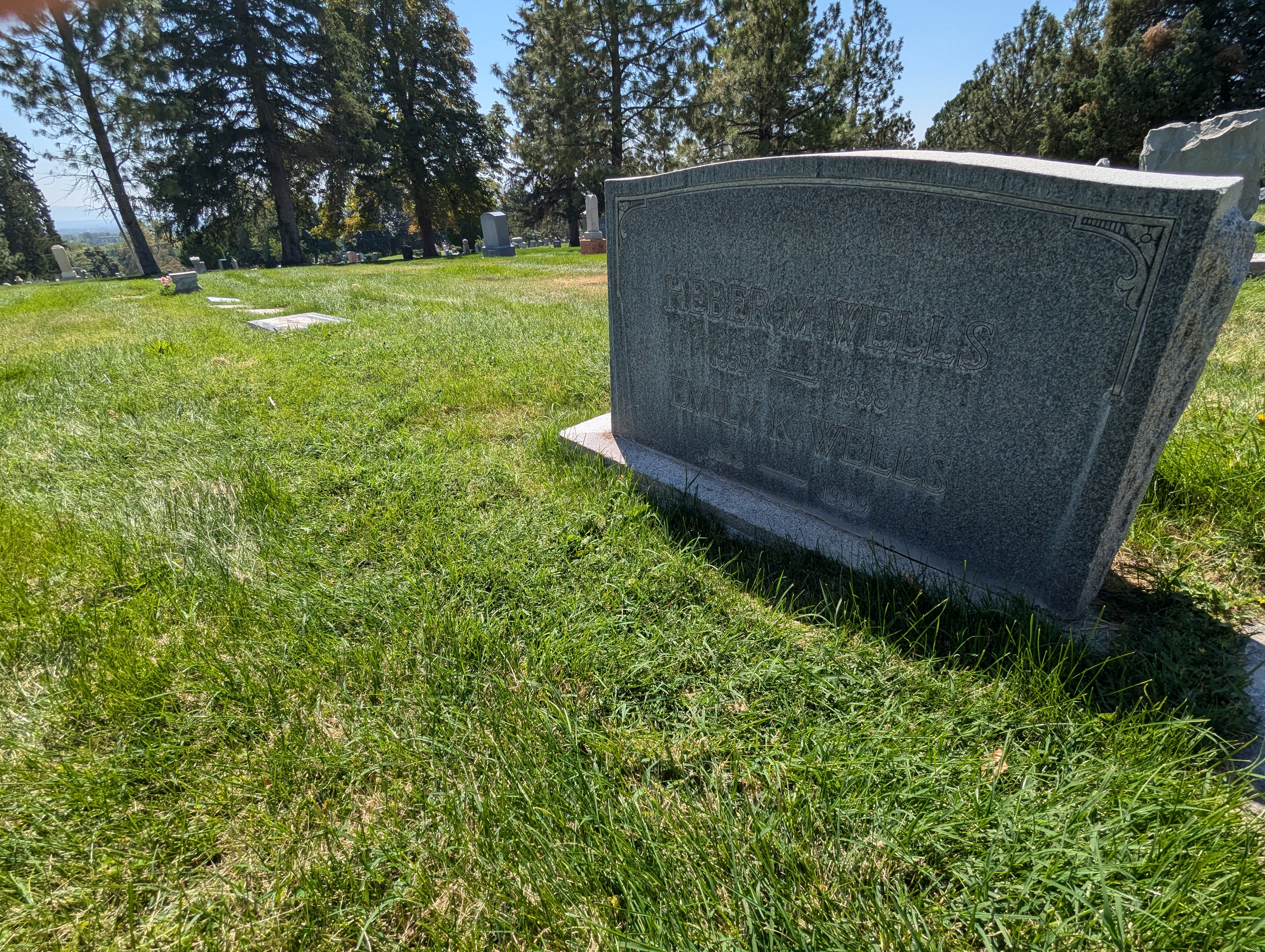
While opponents in the election, Wells and Caine would both end up being buried in Salt Lake City Cemetery. Wells's headstone is just several yards away from Caine's oval headstone. (Caine's oval-top headstone is the one in the center-left background of the photo)

Wells's first term would be dominated by setting up the new state's foundations and systems. In the legislature's first session, which lasted 90 days, 60 bills were sent to Wells to sign, many dealing with the basic organization of state courts and offices, election reform (including the secret ballot), and codification of laws. Wells also wanted railroad regulation, but his proposal was rejected. In 1897, he would also establish the state's first laws dealing with irrigation and water rights.

== See also ==
- Utah Territory
- 1900 Utah gubernatorial election
