= William Spry =

American politician (1864–1929)

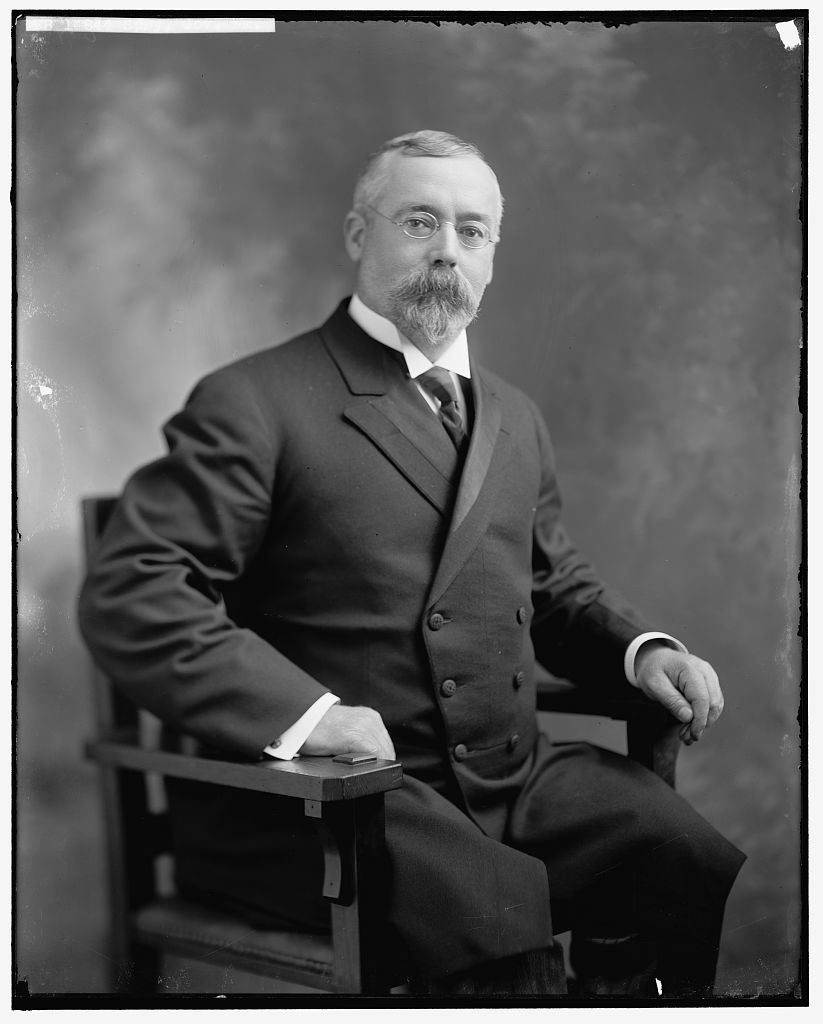
- Spry, 1905–1929

34th Commissioner of the General Land Office
- In office March 22, 1921 – April 21, 1929
- President: Warren G. Harding; Calvin Coolidge; Herbert Hoover
- Preceded by: Clay Tallman
- Succeeded by: Charles C. Moore

Chair of the National Governors Association
- In office August 24, 1915 – December 14, 1916
- Preceded by: David I. Walsh
- Succeeded by: Arthur Capper

3rd Governor of Utah
- In office January 4, 1909 – January 1, 1917
- Preceded by: John Christopher Cutler
- Succeeded by: Simon Bamberger

Personal details
- Born: January 11, 1864 Windsor, England, UK
- Died: April 21, 1929 (aged 65) Washington, D.C., U.S.
- Party: Republican
- Spouse: Mary Wrathall
- Children: 3

William Spry (January 11, 1864 – April 21, 1929) was an American politician who was the third governor of the State of Utah. He is the namesake of the William Spry Agriculture Building that houses the Utah Department of Agriculture and Food.

== Life and career ==
Spry was born at Windsor, Berkshire, England. He emigrated to Utah Territory with his parents at the age of eleven.

In 1885, Spry was called as an LDS Church missionary and went to serve in the Southern States Mission. From 1888 to 1891, Spry served as president of the Southern States Mission. In 1890, during his mission, Spry received permission from the leaders of the church to return briefly to Salt Lake City where he married Mary Alice Wrathall.

In 1894, Spry was elected county collector in Tooele County, Utah. In 1902 Spry was elected to the Utah House of Representatives and in 1905 he was appointed one of the members of the Utah state board of land commissioners. From 1906 to 1908, Spry served as United States Marshal for the District of Utah.

He served as governor of Utah from 1909 to 1917. He was a Republican. Spry was a strong opponent of Prohibition, and vetoed two bills that would have implemented this. In 1915, Spry refused President Woodrow Wilson's request to reconsider the impending execution of Joe Hill and allowed the execution to take place on November 19.

From 1921 to 1929 Spry served as commissioner of Public Lands.

Spry died in Washington, D.C., in 1929 when he was still serving as the Federal Commissioner of Public Lands. He was buried at Salt Lake City Cemetery.

== See also ==
- List of United States governors born outside the United States
- Mount Spry, a mountain named in his honor

Party political offices
Preceded by John Christopher Cutler	Republican nominee for Governor of Utah; 1908, 1912	Succeeded by Nephi Morris
Political offices
Preceded by John Christopher Cutler	Governor of Utah; 1909–1917	Succeeded by Simon Bamberger
Preceded by David I. Walsh	Chair of the National Governors Association; 1915–1916	Succeeded by Arthur Capper
Preceded by Clay Tallman	Commissioner of the General Land Office; 1921–1929	Succeeded by Charles C. Moore
