= Samuel Shapiro =

Samuel Shapiro may refer to:

- Samuel Shapiro (Illinois politician) (1907–1987), governor of Illinois
- Samuel Shapiro (Maine politician) (born 1927), Maine politician
- Samuel Sanford Shapiro (1930–2023), statistician who developed the Shapiro–Wilk test

== See also ==
- Shmuel Shapiro (born 1974), French Jewish rabbi, hazzan, and singer
