= John Moyle (surgeon) =

British naval surgeon

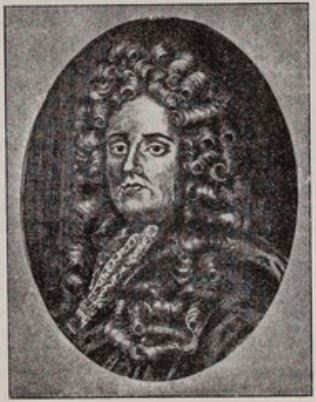
- Died: February 1713–14; Westminster
- Occupation: Naval surgeon

John Moyle (died February 1713–14) was a British naval surgeon.

== Biography ==
Moyle after serving many years at sea in merchant ships and ships of war, and having been "in most of the sea fights that we have had with any nation in my time", was superannuated about 1690 on a pension of apparently £40 a year, and applied himself in his old age to writing his surgical experiences for the benefit of younger sea-surgeons. What he wrote was not, he said, collected out of other authors, but was his own practice, the product of real experience. He nowhere mentions any officer with whom he had served, any ship or any particular battle which he had been in, though he refers some of his experiences to "the last Holland war", to "one of the last fights we had with the Hollanders"—that is to the Third Anglo-Dutch War; or to "before Tripoli in Barbary, when we had wars with that place"—possibly referring to the raid on Tripoli of 24 January 1676, or events of the following Anglo-Algerian War. Similarly he speaks of having been at Newfoundland, and at many places in the Mediterranean; Alexandria, Scanderoon, Smyrna, and Constantinople are incidentally mentioned.

He describes himself in 1693 as "being grown in years and not capable to hold it longer in that employ", as surgeon at sea. He seems to have lived for his remaining years in Westminster, where he died in February 1713–14. His published works are:

- "Abstractum Chirurgiæ Marinæ, or An Abstract of Sea Surgery" (12mo, 1686).
- "Chirurgus Marinus, or The Sea Chirurgion" (12mo, 1693).
- "The Experienced Chirurgion" (12mo, 1703).
- "Chirurgic Memoirs" (12mo, 1708). This last has a portrait in full flowing wig.

He left a widow, Mary, and three children, a son, John, and two daughters, Mary Nozet, and Susanna Willon, apparently by a former marriage. To these he bequeathed one shilling each, "to debar them from claiming any interest in or title to any part of my real or personal estate". To a grandson, James Willon, "now beyond the seas", he left £10 subject to the condition of his demanding it in person within seven years. The rest of the property was left to the widow, "sole and only executrix" (will in Somerset House, Aston, 32, dated 1 March 1702–3, proved 17 Feb. 1713–14). One of the witnesses to the will is Edward Ives, who may probably have been the father of Edward Ives, the naval surgeon and traveller.
