= James Moyle =

American politician

James H. Moyle
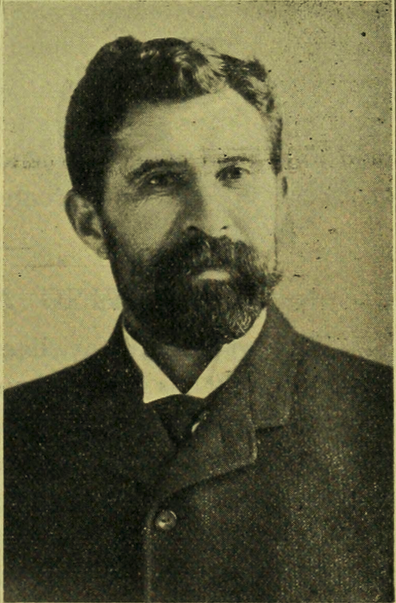
- Born: September 17, 1858; Salt Lake City, Utah
- Died: February 20, 1946 (aged 87); Salt Lake City, Utah
- Known for: Democratic candidate for U.S. Senate and Governor of Utah

James Henry Moyle (September 17, 1858 – February 20, 1946) was a prominent American politician in Utah and noted as "one of Utah's most distinguished citizens and one of the Nations' able and devoted servants."

== Biography ==
Moyle was born in Salt Lake City, Utah Territory to a Cornish American family. He was the grandson of John R. Moyle, a Mormon pioneer and master stonemason for the Salt Lake Temple. From about 1879-1881 Moyle served as a missionary in North Carolina for the Church of Jesus Christ of Latter-day Saints (LDS Church).

Moyle went to the University of Michigan where he received a law degree. He set out to the University of Michigan in 1873 over the strong objections of his stake president who felt that going out of Utah to study law would lead an individual to leave the Church. Moyle's return to Utah with a stronger commitment to serving in the LDS Church than he had previously lead to a change in LDS perceptions of the law as a profession and acceptance of law school even outside of Utah as a workable way to enter the profession.

=== Politics and Public Service ===
After law school, Moyle returned to Utah and quickly ran for County Attorney being elected in 1886. He was re-elected in 1887 before winning election to the House of Representatives in the territorial legislature of 1888. He was appointed chairman of the Committee on Education, fitting as he was the only assemblyman who had graduated from a university, and a member of the Committee on Judiciary and Committee on Municipal Corporations and Towns. During his tenure, Moyle assisted in the acceptance of city land where the Utah capitol is currently located today and introduced measures such as "compiling of the laws of Utah Territory," "custody of a Territorial Library," "establishment and support of district schools," creation of "an institution for deaf mutes," and "an act relating to life insurance companies."

Moyle was a founder of the Utah Democratic Party. He was the Democratic Party's candidate for governor in the 1900 and 1904 Utah elections, losing to Heber Manning Wells and John Christopher Cutler respectively and ran on the Democratic and Progressive tickets in 1914 for the Senate, ceding to Reed Smoot. Moyle served as Assistant Secretary of the Treasury from 1917 to 1921 in the administration of Woodrow Wilson, the first member of the LDS Church to be appointed to a subcabinet position. In 1933 he was appointed by President Franklin D. Roosevelt, who knew Moyle well having served together in the Wilson administration, as Commissioner of the United States Customs Service and in 1939 as a special assistant to Treasury Secretary Henry Morgenthau.

=== Church service ===
Moyle served as a member of the High Council of the Ensign Stake in Utah for three decades. From 1928 to 1933 he served as president of the Eastern States Mission of the LDS Church. This mission covered New York, Pennsylvania, West Virginia, Maryland, Delaware the District of Columbia, Connecticut, Massachusetts, Rhode Island and New Jersey. Moyle created an innovative radio proselytizing program, in all overseeing the creation of a total of 764 programs on various stations throughout the mission. During his administration West Virginia and Western Maryland were separated off into the East Central States Mission.

=== Death ===
Moyle died in 1946 at the age of 87. His son Henry D. Moyle became an Apostle of the LDS Church in 1947.

== See also ==
- Phrenology and the Latter Day Saint Movement

== Notes ==
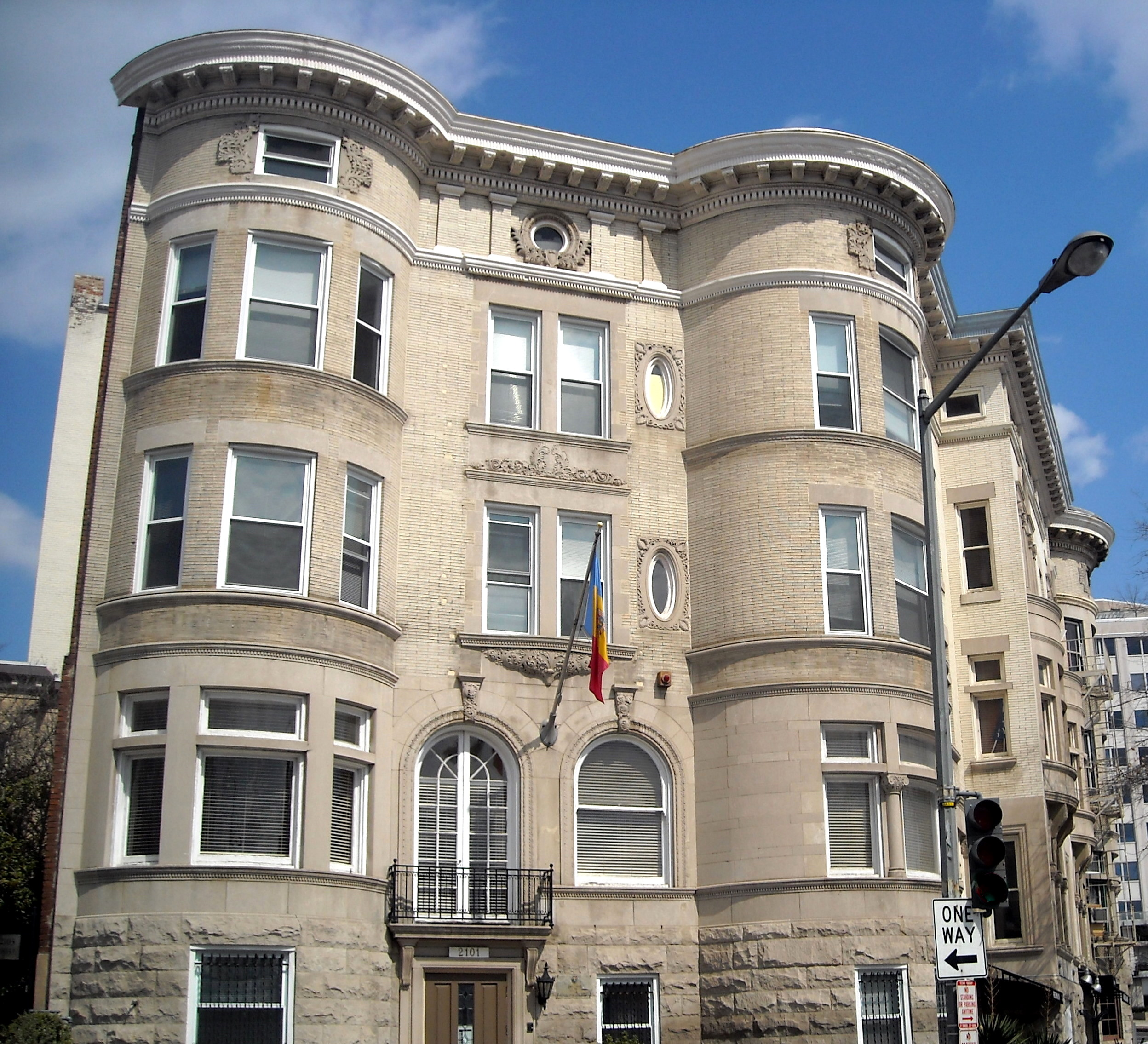
Moyle's former residence in Washington, D.C.

Party political offices
Preceded by John T. Caine	Democratic nominee for Governor of Utah; 1900, 1904	Succeeded by Jesse Knight
First	Democratic nominee for U.S. Senator from Utah (Class 3); 1914	Succeeded by Milton H. Welling
