= Moyle =

Moyle may refer to:

== Places ==
- Moyle District Council, a former local authority in County Antrim, Northern Ireland
- Moyle River, Northern Territory, Australia
- Straits of Moyle, the sea between northeastern Northern Ireland southwestern Scotland

== Other uses ==
- Moyle horse, a rare breed of horse
- HVDC Moyle, an electrical interconnector between Scotland and Northern Ireland
- Moyle v. United States, a Supreme Court case

== See also ==
- Moyles (disambiguation)
- Moyle (surname)
- Mohel
