= Carbon County Strike =

Utah miners labor action, 1903–04

The Carbon County Strikes took place in Carbon County, Utah from 1903–1904. The strikes primarily consisted of Slavic and Italian immigrant mine workers who partnered with the United Mine Workers of America strikes in Colorado to protest the dangerous working conditions of the Utah coal mines. The Carbon County strikes were considered the most important labor confrontation in the United States at the time. The Utah Fuel Company strongly opposed initiatives to unionize coal workers in Utah and were the primary opposition to the UMWA at the time. The Carbon County Strikes would ultimately fail in its attempt to unionize the coal workers of Utah simply because it "did not have enough support, either internally or externally, to win against a powerful and influential company that effectively played on radical, anti-foreign sentiments in defending its position" but it demonstrated a significant nationwide effort in strengthening unionization in the west.

== Origins ==
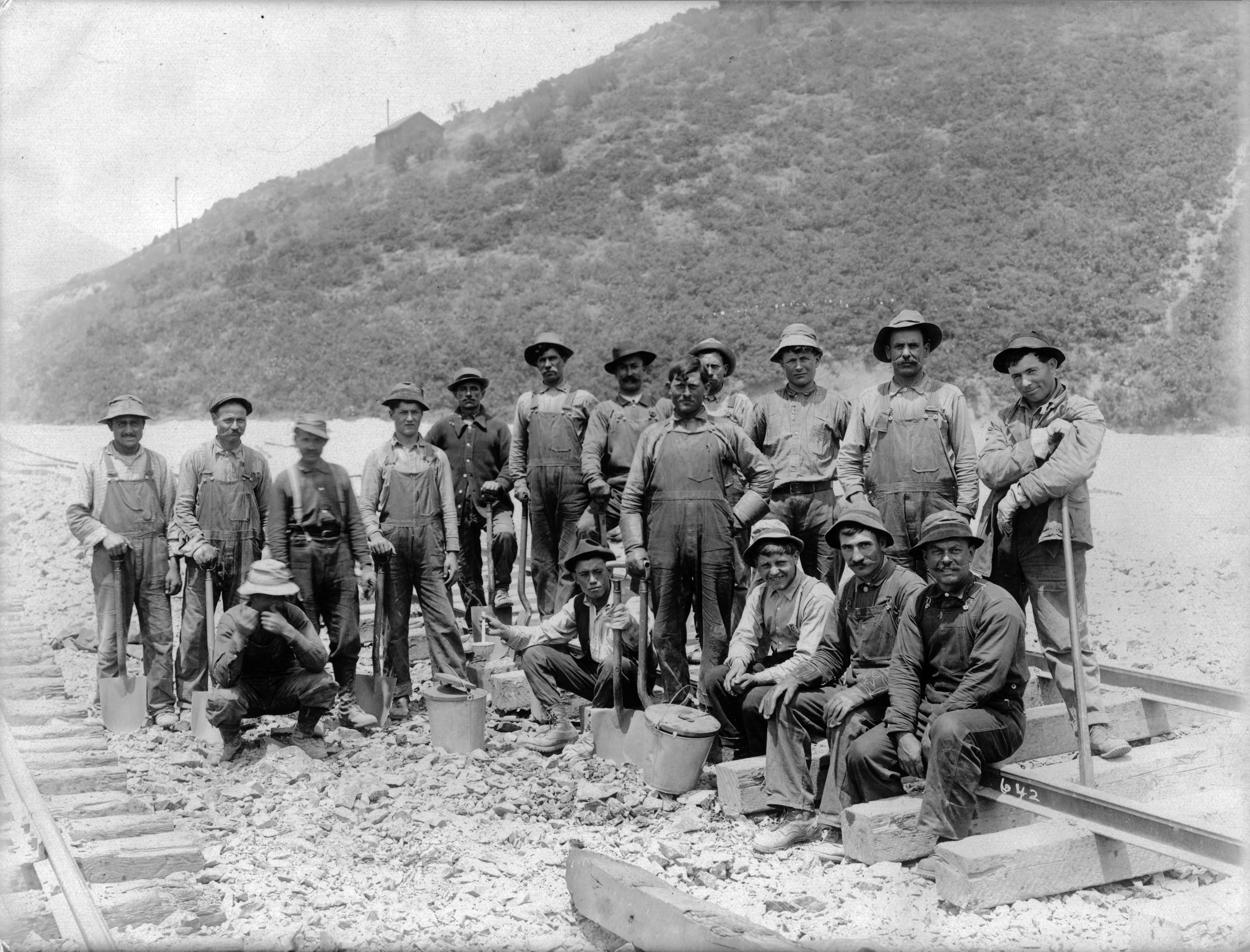
Utah miners from the late 19th century.

The labor movement in the United States experienced some of its greatest gains in the early years of the twentieth century. Union membership was not only increasing in already established unions but newer unions began to form and expand under a wave of new immigrants from southern and eastern Europe. Nationwide union membership was roughly 870,000 in 1900 and in 4 years it had more than doubled to 2,072,700 members. The United Mine Workers Association was the collective voice of mine workers during the labor movement but their influence was limited to only eastern coal regions of Pennsylvania, Ohio, Indiana, and Illinois.

The coal industry had been hit hard by the Panic of 1893 and as a result the average wages of coal miners had diminished by 10 to 30 percent. UMWA leadership struggled to consolidate support among miners in the eastern regions and the bleak economic outlook only stirred more frustration with miners in the coal industry. The UMWA responded to the economic depression with the Coal Miners' Strike of 1897 and the Coal Strike of 1902. The strikes offered a collective voice for miners to speak out against the deplorable conditions of mining camps and proved to be popular movement among miners in eastern mining regions. Western mining regions would not join or participate in the early Coal Miners' Strikes but the success of the UMWA in increasing wages for their workers inspired support among immigrant miners of the west. The coal miners of Carbon County consisted mainly of immigrant workers and had little association with the UMWA.

Up until the twentieth century the UMWA primarily focused its attention to eastern coal regions causing Utah miners to fail numerous times in their effort to unionize but the success of out of state unions had produced hope for members of labor movement in Utah. The UMWA had successfully conducted campaign operations to unionize workers in Pennsylvania, Ohio, Indiana, and Illinois but looked to expand their control over western coal regions in Colorado, Wyoming and Utah. The success of the Coal Miners' Strike, specifically the 1902 Anthracite Strike in Pennsylvania had confirmed the influence the UMWA held over the coal industry and mine workers of Utah sought to capture the momentum of the recent union victories.

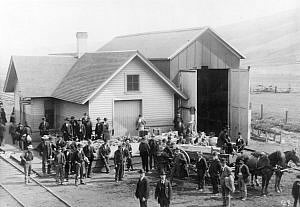
Coffins waiting for rail transport to the Winter Quarters mine site near Scofield, Utah, after the Scofield Mine Disaster on May 1, 1900.

== Strike ==
The Carbon County Strike developed in September 1903 from a coal miner strike that began in Colorado. The Utah strikes coordinated in partnership with the strikes in Colorado to help with efforts in Carbon County and sustain funding that was provided by the UMWA. The UMWA leadership organized recruitment campaigns in Utah and quickly gained a majority of coal miners support in the strike efforts. UMWA organizers frequently toured back and forth between Utah and Colorado, establishing a solid base organization within two coordinating strikes. The large population of Italian immigrants who worked in the Utah coal mines had already established connections with other Italian miners in Colorado, making the organization efforts easier for the UMWA to consolidate and grow their base of support.

The coal miners of Utah heavily favored the message the UWMA promoted and backed their initiatives for greater representation in the coal industry. As union membership continued to surge throughout the United States, Utah miners saw an opportunistic chance to improve working conditions and gain the right to collectively bargain. The UMWA message of a united coal workers front proved to be an effective strategy in harnessing support. The tragedy of the Scofield Mine disaster brought awareness for the much needed improvement of safety precautions in the mines and motivated Utah mine workers to continue striking. Horrid work conditions of the mines and continued mining incidents fueled Utah strike efforts but public perception of Utah coal miners began to turn negative because of their association with the violent Colorado coal strikes.

The partnership of the Carbon County strike and Colorado strikes would prove to be the downfall of the labor movement in Utah. The Colorado strike began to develop into a civil war and the citizens of Utah feared that the Carbon County Strike would soon follow the same course of action. The UMWA vowed to fund the Utah strikers until they had successfully unionized but the financial burden to fight an uphill battle would bleed the union dry. Utah coal strikers resented the abandonment of the UMWA and it took over 10 years before another effort to unionize would take place. Most of the Utah coal strikers in support of the labor movement were left with no compensation or job to financially support themselves once the UMWA withdrew from Utah in 1904.

== Utah resistance to unions ==
=== Utah Fuel Company ===
Opposition to the Carbon County Strike was primarily funded by the Utah Fuel Company and backed by government officials who used the violence exhibited in the Colorado strikes to undermine the growing labor movement in Utah. The Utah Fuel Company created a narrative that Utah miners had no real issue against the working conditions of the mines or a lack of representation, rather they were pressured into supporting the strikes in Colorado by the UMWA. The Utah Fuel Company continued to label the strike as a sympathetic protest in support of the Colorado miners and blamed the UMWA organizers for instigating protest were none was warranted.

The Utah Fuel Company took heavy measures against the strikers and implemented company policies that restricted credit payments to their workers until the strike had ended. Workers who didn’t walkout and remained loyal were guaranteed protection from the outside influences of the UMWA. The company went to great lengths to assure their remaining employees that they had their best interest in mind. Remaining workers were isolated from any union influence and were escorted through protest lines by hired armed guards. Company officials countered union efforts by cutting off all ties to strikers and notified them to vacate the area. The company successfully kept the mines from shutting down by starting a campaign to recruit local farmers to work in the mines.

The Utah Fuel Company strategically used the animosity toward foreign workers to gain public support in defeating the UWMA. The company tokened the narrative of "worst element of foreigners" in order to justify their claim that only single men without families who recently arrived to the coal fields supported the labor movement and the old time English-speaking miners were against any unionization efforts. Public opinion was very receptive to the foreign narrative promoted by the Utah Fuel Company and as a result they would continue to not recognize the UWMA. Even though the UMWA established a solid base with over two-thirds of the Utah miners signing into their union, the efforts to support foreign strikers became a liability in winning over the sympathy of the overwhelming Mormon public.

=== Use of National Guard to break strike ===
The fear of violence erupting had consumed the state of Utah during the Carbon County Strike and Carbon County Sheriff Hyrum Wilcox requested troop support from Utah government officials. Utah Governor Heber M. Wells would answer Wilcox’s request by sending Gen. John Q. Cannon of the Utah National Guard to investigate and report on the circumstances involving union protesters in Carbon County. Cannon reports contradicted the hysteria of violence the Utah Fuel Company had promoted. Cannon found that the overall morale of the coal camps was at its highest and union organizers were having some of their best recruitment numbers, with approximately twelve hundred new union members. Cannon did note his concern over the increasing number of union members and worried about a violent clash between the Utah Fuel Company armed guards and the strikers. Government officials looked over Cannon’s report detailing the lawful protest in Carbon County and decided in a unanimous decision to bring the guard in for security purposes. Wells called for the National Guard the very next day and on November 23, 1903, he would station the entire National Guard in Carbon County. The motivation behind sending the entire National Guard was questionable to many in the UMWA and was thought of as a tool to push union influence out of the state. According to media reports, National Guard officers were instructed to protect company property from violent protesters instead of being instructed to keep the peace between both sides. The National Guard was sent in with the assumption that the Carbon County Strikers were instigating violence in the area. Utah coal companies and government officials misrepresented reports from the coal fields in favor of the companies and used the National Guard as a private military force to intimidate union expansion in Utah.

== Mormon influence ==
Utah Labor Historian Allan Kent Powell notes that the first "Mormon Pioneers of 1847 brought with them from Nauvoo, Illinois, not only a strong religious faith but also experience with the budding unionism of that day, a development with its roots in the trade union movement of England and the northeastern states." The Mormon culture in Utah was greatly influenced by British converts who were raised under the environment of the British trade union movement and many of their members originated from the northeastern states that not yet industrialized. When Mormons migrated to the Salt Lake Valley they inherently adopted union principles when founding the state of Utah.

Many members from the Church of Jesus Christ of Latter-day Saints (LDS Church) joined labor unions such as the Noble Order of the Knights of Labor and Mormon participation in the labor movement was at an all-time high in the 1880s. By the turn of the century LDS Church officials adopted capitalism as their economic system to better transition into becoming a state within the United States. Utah’s acceptance of capitalism brought on a new wave of anti-unionism. Church leaders who weren’t necessarily comfortable with the principles of union membership welcomed the change to capitalism and actively opposed union participation to their church congregations. The narrative supporting unionism began to shift as church leaders would associate union participation as a violation of the doctrine of "free agency." LDS Church policy began to reflect the sentiments of the Utah Fuel Company and Mormon members accepted the narrative against the Carbon County Strikes. The general authority of the church came to the aid of coal companies by encouraging their congregations to protest the Carbon County Strike and act as strikebreakers at mine sites. For the Utah Fuel Company, influencing the densely populated Mormon community was critical in there effort refute the unions. Mormons feared the violent tendencies of the Colorado strikes and associated the Utah labor movement with hostile nature of Colorado union members. Most members in the LDS Church lost sympathy for the Carbon County strikers and the association with Colorado strikes proved to be a liability for their cause.
