= Heber Manning Wells =

American politician (1859–1938)

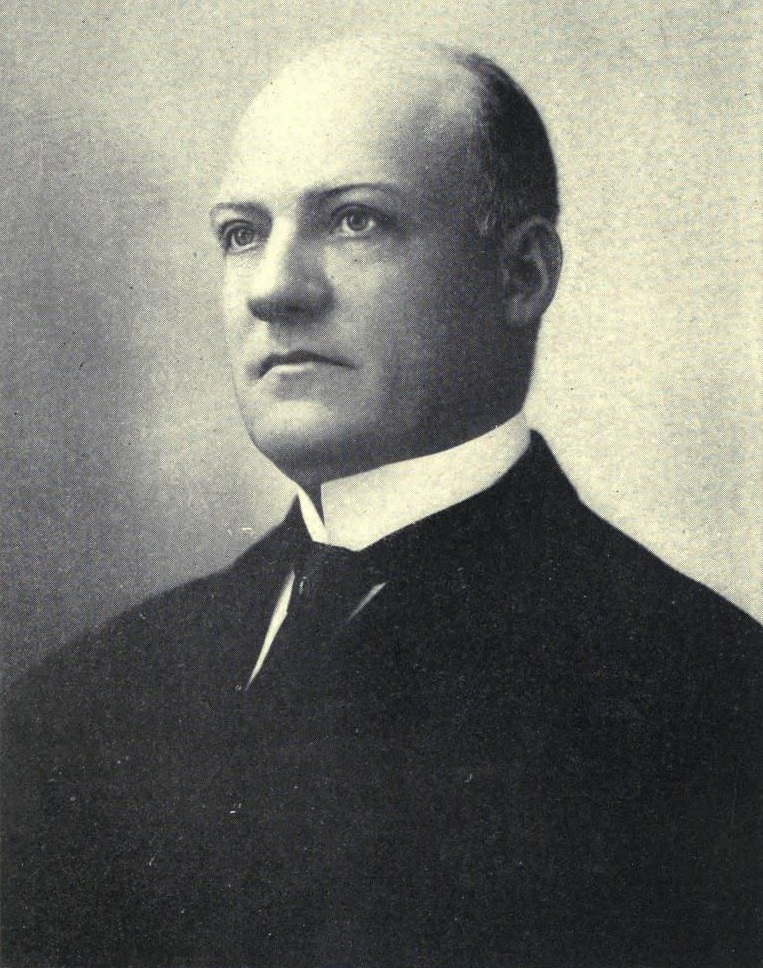
- from 1909's Sketches of the Inter-Mountain States

1st Governor of Utah
- In office January 6, 1896 – January 2, 1905
- Preceded by: Caleb Walton West (as governor of Utah Territory)
- Succeeded by: John Christopher Cutler

Salt Lake City Recorder and Auditor
- In office 1882–1890
- Preceded by: John Thomas Caine
- Succeeded by: James F. Jack

Personal details
- Born: August 11, 1859 Salt Lake City, Utah Territory
- Died: March 12, 1938 (aged 78) Salt Lake City, Utah, US
- Resting place: Salt Lake City Cemetery
- Party: Republican
- Spouse(s): Mary Elizabeth Beatie (m. 1880; died 1888) Teresa Clawson Cummings (m. 1892; died 1897) Emily Katz (m. 1903)
- Relations: Daniel H. Wells (father); Briant H. Wells (brother)
- Children: 7
- Education: University of Utah
- Occupation: Banker

Heber Manning Wells (August 11, 1859 – March 12, 1938) was an American politician and banker who served as the first governor of the State of Utah. Utah gained statehood on January 4, 1896; Wells served as governor from January 6, 1896, until January 2, 1905.

== Biography ==
Wells was born in Salt Lake City on August 11, 1859, to Daniel H. Wells and Martha Givens (Harris) Wells. He was a descendant of two Connecticut governors, Thomas Welles and John Webster. His father was a prominent figure in the Church of Jesus Christ of Latter-day Saints who served as mayor of Salt Lake City. Wells' siblings included Briant H. Wells, a major general in the United States Army. Heber Wells attended the schools of Salt Lake City, graduated from the University of Utah in 1875 and began a career in banking and local government.

== Career ==
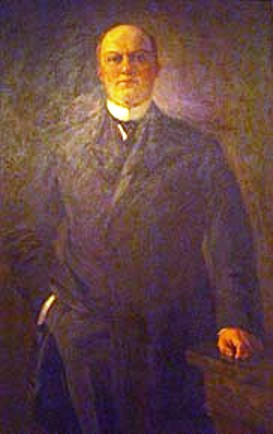
Painting of Heber Manning Wells

Wells was manager of the Utah Savings & Trust Company and a director of the State Bank of Utah. He was also active in Salt Lake City's civic life, including membership in the Alta Club, Commercial Club, Sons of the American Revolution, and Sons of Utah Pioneers.

After serving as deputy to city recorder and auditor John Thomas Caine, Wells was Salt Lake City's recorder and auditor from 1882 to 1890, In 1887, he was secretary of Utah Territory's constitutional convention. He was elected to terms on the city board of public works in 1890 and 1893, was an unsuccessful candidate for mayor in 1892, and was a delegate to the 1895 convention that created the state constitution which resulted in Utah's admission to the union as the 45th state.

== Governor of Utah ==
In 1895, Wells defeated Utah Republican Party chairman Charles Crane and former territorial governor Arthur Lloyd Thomas for the Republican nomination for governor. In the general election, he defeated Caine, the Democratic nominee, his former superior in the Salt Lake City recorder's office, and a former territorial Delegate to Congress. Wells won a five-year term, which was created to set up even-numbered year elections every four years beginning in 1900. In 1900, he was reelected to a four-year term, defeating Democrat James Moyle. Having assumed office at age 36, Wells is the youngest person to have served as Utah's governor.

Wells' first term dealt with the formation and organization of the new state government, including courts and executive branch departments. Ongoing concern over the availability of water for both agriculture and an expanding population led in 1897 to the state's first laws concerning irrigation and water rights. Wells was also a supporter of creating the Branch Normal School for training teachers, which later became Southern Utah University. In addition, he backed creation of the first state-sponsored organization for supporting the arts, which eventually became the Utah Arts Council. During his first term, the state also accepted federal land at Fort Douglas as the site for the University of Utah. In 1900, Wells named Emma J. McVicker as the state superintendent of public instruction, making her the first woman to hold a high post in Utah's government.

During his second term, Wells backed creation of the School of Mines at the University of Utah and the State Bureau of Statistics, and supported establishing uniform standards for dairy products and other foods. He also supported implementation of the federal Carey Act, which allowed private companies to create large irrigation systems and profit from the sale of water. Wells ordered 300 members of the Utah National Guard to respond to the 1903-1904 Carbon County Strike, and their protection of replacement workers hired from nearby communities enabled the coal mine owners to break the strike.

Wells intended to campaign for a seat in the United States Senate for the term beginning in 1905, but agreed to defer to U.S. Representative George Sutherland, who was elected. Instead, Wells was persuaded to run for another term as governor in 1904, but he lost the Republican nomination to John Christopher Cutler, who won the general election.

== Later career, personal life and death ==
After leaving the governorship, Wells returned to his banking interests. From 1913 to 1917, he served as Salt Lake City's Commissioner of Parks and Property. In 1919, he became editor of the Salt Lake City Herald.

Wells was later assistant treasurer and then treasurer of the United States Shipping Board Merchant Fleet Corporation. He retired in 1933 and returned to Utah, where he was associate editor of the Deseret Evening News.

Wells married Mary Elizabeth Beatie in 1880. She died in 1888 and in 1892 Wells married Teresa Clawson. Teresa died in 1897 and in 1903 Wells married Emily Katz.

Wells was the father of seven children—Manning, Heber, Mary, Martha, Florence, John, and Burton.

Wells died of a stroke in Salt Lake City on March 12, 1938, aged 78. He was buried at Salt Lake City Cemetery.

== See also ==
- Pelican Point Murders

Party political offices
First	Republican nominee for Governor of Utah; 1895, 1900	Succeeded by John Christopher Cutler
Political offices
Preceded by Caleb Walton West; Territorial Governor	Governor of Utah; January 6, 1896 – January 2, 1905	Succeeded by John Christopher Cutler
