= John Rowe Moyle =

Mormon pioneer and stonemason

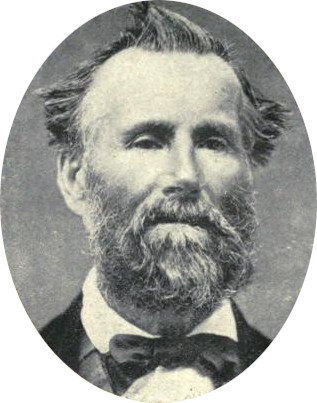
- Born: February 22, 1808; Wendron, England
- Died: January 15, 1889 (aged 80); Alpine, Utah
- Known for: Stonemason on the Salt Lake Temple

John Rowe Moyle (22 February 1808, Wendron, Cornwall, England – 15 January 1889, Alpine, Utah Territory) was a Mormon pioneer and a settler of Alpine, Utah. He was a master stonemason for the Salt Lake Temple, and was the carver of the inscription "Holiness to the Lord" on the temple's east side.

== Biography ==
Moyle was born in Cornwall, England, to James and Elizabeth Rowe Moyle. In his youth he worked in the tin mines of Cornwall, and later became a stonemason, learning the trade from his father. He and his family converted to the Church of Jesus Christ of Latter-day Saints (LDS Church) in 1851. Moyle travelled to Utah Territory with the first handcart company in 1856, settling in Alpine two years later.

Both a farmer and a stonemason, Moyle travelled to Salt Lake City frequently to serve on the temple construction. Moyle installed the Temple's circular staircase and carved the inscription "Holiness to the Lord" on the east side of the Temple. In 1863, Moyle helped build a chapel in Alpine. He also built an Indian fort to protect his family during the invasion of Salt Lake City by federal troops.

Moyle suffered a compound fracture of the leg when he was kicked by a cow, necessitating the leg's amputation by his family and friends. Moyle subsequently carved a wooden leg for himself and learned how to use it. After the accident, he would again walk to Salt Lake City and work on the temple.

Moyle was married to Phillippa Beer, who was born in Devonshire, England, and (polygamously) to Mary Ann Williams. Moyle's son, James Moyle, became foreman of the builders and stone-cutters on the Temple Block in 1875 and general superintendent of the temple in 1886. Moyle was the grandfather of James H. Moyle, a prominent Utah politician, and the great-grandfather of Henry D. Moyle, an apostle of the LDS Church.

== Legacy ==
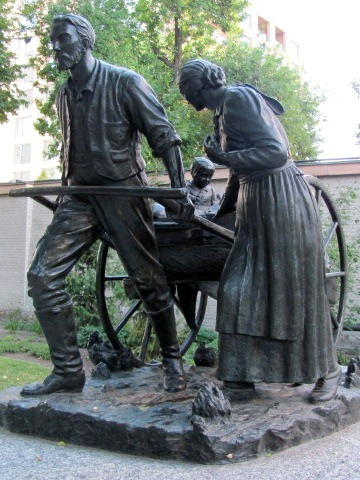
The Handcart Pioneer Monument. Moyle's likeness was used for the adult male in the creation of this statue.

Torleif S. Knaphus used Moyle's likeness (along with several others) as the inspiration for the father's face on the Handcart Pioneer Monument on Temple Square. Moyle is the subject of the 2008 short film Only a Stonecutter, directed by T. C. Christensen and starring Bruce Newbold.
