= John Christopher Cutler =

American politician

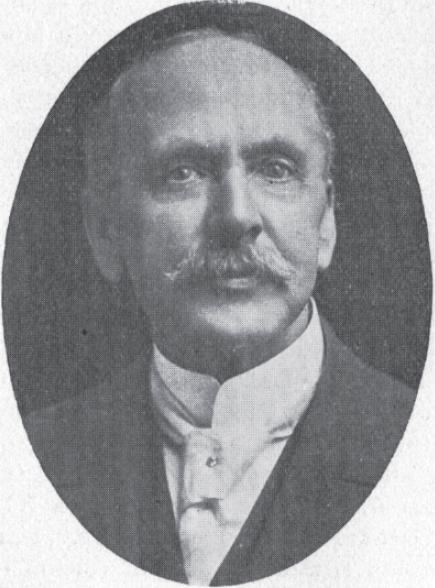

2nd Governor of Utah
- In office January 2, 1905 – January 4, 1909
- Preceded by: Heber Manning Wells
- Succeeded by: William Spry

Clerk of Salt Lake County, Utah
- In office 1884–1890
- Preceded by: Dirk Bockholt
- Succeeded by: Clarence Emir Allen

Personal details
- Born: February 5, 1846 Sheffield, England
- Died: July 30, 1928 (aged 82) Salt Lake City, Utah, US
- Cause of death: Suicide by firearm
- Resting place: Salt Lake City Cemetery; 40.777°N 111.858°W
- Party: Republican
- Spouse: Sarah Elizabeth Taylor
- Children: 7
- Occupation: Businessman

John Christopher Cutler (February 5, 1846 – July 30, 1928) was an American politician and the second governor of the State of Utah. He served as governor from 1905 to 1909.

== Biography ==
Cutler was born in Sheffield, England, on February 5, 1846. Cutler's family emigrated to Utah Territory in 1864 after becoming members of the Church of Jesus Christ of Latter-day Saints. Cutler married Sarah Elizabeth Taylor, with whom he was the father of seven children. Cutler became a successful businessman, serving as president of his family's dry goods business and holding board of directors seats for several banks, insurance companies, and other companies. Cutler was active in politics and government as a Republican and served as Salt Lake County Clerk from 1884 to 1890.

== Governor of Utah ==
In the early 1900s, Cutler was affiliated with the Republican Party faction called the "Federal Bunch", holders of federal office who were opposed to incumbent Governor Heber M. Wells. In 1904 Wells was unable to attract support for his planned candidacy for U.S. Senate, so he ran for reelection as governor. The Federal Bunch backed Cutler. He won the Republican nomination and was elected governor in November 1904. Cutler served from 1905 to 1909. His term was notable for laws that established juvenile courts in the state's largest cities and a central birth and death registry administered by the state board of health.

He announced his candidacy for reelection in 1908, but withdrew prior to the Republican convention when he lost the support of Federal Bunch, which was led by Senator Reed Smoot.

== Post-governorship ==
After serving as governor, Cutler returned to his business interests. In 1911, he was elected President of the Deseret National Bank.

== Death and burial ==
At age 82 and in ill health, Cutler used a revolver to commit suicide on July 30, 1928. He was buried at Salt Lake City Cemetery.

== See also ==
- List of United States governors born outside the United States

== Notes ==
Party political offices
Preceded by Heber Manning Wells	Republican nominee for Governor of Utah; 1904	Succeeded by William Spry
Political offices
Preceded by Heber Manning Wells	Governor of Utah; January 2, 1905 – January 4, 1909	Succeeded by William Spry
