= 2012 United States Senate election in Utah =

- November 6, 2012
- Turnout: 55.4% (voting eligible)
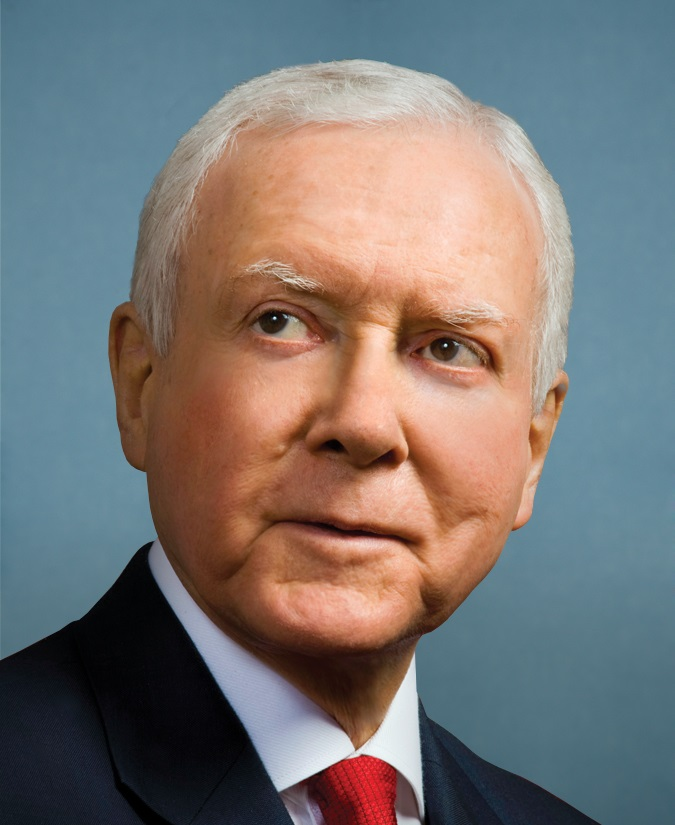

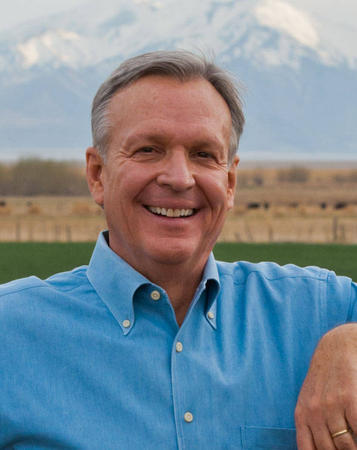
Nominee	Orrin Hatch	Scott Howell
Party	Republican	Democratic
Popular vote	657,608	301,873
Percentage	65.31%	29.98%
- Hatch: 40–50% 50–60% 60–70% 70–80% 80–90% Howell: 40–50%
U.S. senator before election
Orrin Hatch
Republican
Elected U.S. Senator
Orrin Hatch
Republican

The 2012 United States Senate election in Utah took place on November 6, 2012, concurrently with the 2012 U.S. presidential election, as well as other elections to the United States Senate and House of Representatives and as various state and local elections. Incumbent Republican U.S. Senator Orrin Hatch won re-election to a seventh and final term against the Democratic candidate, former state senator and IBM executive Scott Howell, in a rematch of the 2000 Senate election, with Hatch doing slightly better than in 2000.

== Background ==
Orrin Hatch won re-election to a sixth term after winning 62.4% of the vote against Pete Ashdown in the 2006 U.S. senatorial election in Utah. Tea Party activists targeted Hatch for a primary challenge, similar to the victory of Mike Lee over Bob Bennett in the 2010 election.

== Republican nomination ==
=== Convention ===
==== Candidates ====
Declared

- Tim Aalders, radio talk show host and former business manager
- Dale Ash, retired sales manager
- Arlan Brunson, small business owner
- David Chiu
- Kevin Fisk, small business owner
- Jeremy Friedbaum, small business owner and candidate for the U.S. Senate in 2010
- Orrin Hatch, incumbent U.S. senator
- Chris Herrod, state representative
- William "Dub" Lawrence
- Dan Liljenquist, former state senator

Declined

- Jason Chaffetz, U.S. representative
- Jon Huntsman, Jr., former ambassador to China, former governor of Utah, former ambassador to Singapore and candidate for president in 2012
- David Kirkham, co-founder of the Utah tea party
- Morgan Philpot, former state representative and 2010 congressional candidate
- Mark Shurtleff, Utah attorney general

==== Campaign ====
In 2006, incumbent Orrin Hatch won re-election to a sixth term. In 2008, Chaffetz defeated the incumbent Republican U.S. Representative, Chris Cannon, in the 2008 primary for Utah's 3rd congressional district. In 2010, Mike Lee defeated Bob Bennett in the 2010 Utah Senate election. In March 2011, just-elected U.S. Senator Mike Lee said he will not endorse Hatch in the primary. In May 2011, Chaffetz told several Utah political insiders that he plans to run. He said he won't make an official decision until after Labor Day of 2011.

In June 2011, prominent conservative radio talk show host Mark Levin endorsed Hatch. The fiscally conservative 501(c)4 organization Club for Growth encouraged Chaffetz to run. The group cited Hatch's support for the Troubled Asset Relief Program, State Children's Health Insurance Program, No Child Left Behind Act, Bridge to Nowhere, and other votes among the reasons why they opposed his re-election. In an interview with Politico, Chaffetz stated, "After 34 years of service, I think most Utahans want a change. They want to thank him for his service, but it's time to move on. And for me personally, I think he's been on the wrong side of a host of major issues." The congressman cited Hatch's vote in favor of Equal Opportunity to Serve Act and the Health Equity and Access Reform Today Act of 1993. However, Chaffetz ultimately decided against a run.

==== Endorsements ====
Orrin Hatch

Individuals

- Ken Blackwell, member of board of directors of Club for Growth and former Ohio secretary of state
- Sam Brownback, governor of Kansas and former U.S. senator (R-KS)
- Mike Crapo, U.S. senator (R-ID)
- C. Boyden Gray, co-chairman of FreedomWorks Foundation Board and former White House Counsel
- Sean Hannity, prominent conservative radio and television host, author, and political commentator
- Hugh Hewitt, conservative talk radio host
- Mark Levin, conservative talk radio host
- Mitt Romney, former governor of Massachusetts, former president and CEO of the Salt Lake Organizing Committee for the 2002 Winter Olympics, and presidential candidate in 2008 and 2012
- Sal Russo, co-founder of Tea Party Express

Organizations

- GOProud
Dan Liljenquist

Individuals

- Stuart Adams, state senator
- Casey Anderson, state senator
- Kevin Cromer, former state representative
- Margaret Dayton, state senator
- Lyle W. Hillyard, state senator
- Dave Hinkins, state senator
- Michelle Malkin, conservative author and commentator
- Wayne L. Niederhauser, state senator
- Ralph Okerlund, state senator
- Aaron Osmond, state senator
- Stuart Reid, state senator
- Howard A. Stephenson, state senator
- Jerry Stevenson, state senator
- Stephen H. Urquhart, state senator
- Todd Weiler, state senator

Organizations

- Gun Owners of America

==== Polling ====
In a January 2012 UtahPolicy.com poll of 1,291 Salt Lake County Republican caucus participants, 42% chose Hatch, 23% Liljenquist, 5% Herrod, and 30% were undecided. In a January 28, 2012 straw poll of 194 votes at the Box Elder County Republican Party Lincoln Day Dinner, 42% chose Liljenquist, 41% for Hatch, and 17% for Herrod.

==== Results ====
Republican convention, 1st round results
Party	Candidate	Votes	%
Republican	Orrin Hatch	2,243	57.25
Republican	Dan Liljenquist	1,108	28.28
Republican	Chris Herrod	421	10.75
Republican	Tim Aalders	78	1.99
Republican	Dale Ash	18	0.46
Republican	David Chiu	17	0.43
Republican	Jeremy Friedbaum	15	0.38
Republican	Loy Arlan Brunson	14	0.36
Republican	Kevin Fisk	3	0.08
Republican	Dub Lawrence	1	0.03
Total votes		3,918	100

Republican convention, 2nd round results
Party	Candidate	Votes	%
Republican	Orrin Hatch	2,313	59.19
Republican	Dan Liljenquist	1,595	40.81
Total votes		3,908	100

=== Primary ===
==== Candidates ====
- Orrin Hatch, incumbent U.S. senator
- Dan Liljenquist, former state senator

==== Campaign ====
After the convention, Hatch had $3 million more than Liljenquist.

==== Endorsements ====
Orrin Hatch

Individuals

- Scott Anderson, CEO of Zions Bank
- Norm Bangerter, former governor of Utah
- LaVell Edwards, former football coach of Brigham Young University
- Steve Forbes, editor-in-chief of Forbes magazine and CEO of Forbes Inc.
- Sean Hannity, political commentator
- James V. Hansen, former U.S. representative (R-UT)
- Gary Herbert, governor of Utah
- Truman Hunt, CEO of Nu Skin Enterprises
- Josh James, CEO of DOMO
- Jon Kyl, U.S. senator (R-AZ)
- Fred Lampropoulos, CEO of Merit Medical Systems
- Mark Levin, political commentator and president of Landmark Legal Foundation
- Ron McBride, former football coach of Utah State University and Weber State University
- Mike Noel, state representative
- Sarah Palin, former governor of Alaska and 2008 Republican vice presidential nominee
- Mitt Romney, 2012 Republican presidential nominee and former governor of Massachusetts
- Sal Russo, co-leader of the Tea Party Express
- Mark Shurtleff, state attorney general
- Dave Steele, former state senator
- Daniel W. Thatcher, state senator
- Brett Tolman, former U.S. attorney for the District of Utah
- John L. Valentine, state senator

Organizations

- National Rifle Association - Political Victory Fund
Dan Liljenquist

Individuals

- Rick Santorum, former U.S. senator (R-PA)

Organizations

- FreedomWorks

==== Polling ====
Poll source	Date(s) administered	Sample size	Margin of error	Orrin Hatch	Dan Liljenquist	Other/ Undecided
Utah Data Points/Key Research	June 12–19, 2012	500	±4.4%	56%	25%	18%
Deseret News/KSL-TV	June 15–21, 2012	737	±3.6%	60%	32%	8%

==== Results ====
Results by county: Map legend: Hatch—>90%; Hatch—80–90%; Hatch—70–80%; Hatch—60–70%; Hatch—50–60%

Republican primary results
Party	Candidate	Votes	%
Republican	Orrin Hatch (incumbent)	146,394	66.5%
Republican	Dan Liljenquist	73,668	33.5%
Total votes		220,062	100.0%

== Democratic nomination ==
=== Candidates ===
Declared

- Pete Ashdown, businessman and nominee for the U.S. Senate in 2006
- Scott Howell, former state senator and nominee for the U.S. Senate in 2000

=== Results ===
Howell defeated Ashdown 63%-37% to win and avoid a primary.

Democratic convention results
Party	Candidate	Votes	%
Democratic	Scott Howell	-	63
Democratic	Pete Ashdown	-	37
Total votes		-	100

== General election ==
=== Candidates ===
- Bill Barron (Independent)
- Daniel Geery (Justice)
- Orrin Hatch (Republican), incumbent U.S. senator
- Scott Howell (Democratic), former state senator and nominee for the U.S. Senate in 2000
- Shaun McCausland (Constitution)

=== Debates ===
- Complete video of debate, October 17, 2012 - C-SPAN

=== Fundraising ===
Candidate (party)	Receipts	Disbursements	Cash on hand	Debt
Scott Howell (D)	$421,086	$420,779	$306	$0
Orrin Hatch (R)	$11,577,851	$13,140,209	$779,719	$515,845
William Barron (I)	$17,157	$14,116	$3,038	$0
Source: Federal Election Commission

==== Top contributors ====
Scott Howell	Contribution	Orrin Hatch	Contribution	William Barron	Contribution
International Union of Operating Engineers	$10,000	OC Tanner Inc	$72,010	Peace River Citrus Products	$2,000
Altaview Orthodontics	$5,000	Cancer Treatment Centers of America	$67,500	Cirque Property	$1,000
International Brotherhood of Electrical Workers	$5,000	Cerberus Capital Management	$65,000		
International Association of Iron Workers	$5,000	Fresenius Medical Care	$65,500		
Intermountain Healthcare National Education Association	$5,000	Blue Cross & Blue Shield	$54,500		
Shurtleff Construction	$5,000	Ernst & Young	$53,000		
St Mark's Hospital	$5,000	PricewaterhouseCoopers	$42,008		
United Steelworkers	$5,000	Herbalife International	$41,900		
Sutter Health	$4,500	Marriott International	$39,500		
IBM Corporation	$3,150	Apollo Global Management	$39,000		
Source: OpenSecrets

==== Top industries ====
Scott Howell	Contribution	Orrin Hatch	Contribution	William Barron	Contribution
Retired	$43,100	Financial institutions	$1,113,746	Retired	$4,050
Health professionals	$17,000	Pharmaceuticals/health products	$834,601	Agribusiness	$2,000
Building trade unions	$15,000	Lobbyists	$508,567	Real estate	$1,000
Hospitals/nursing homes	$14,500	Insurance	$495,968	Education	$750
Lawyers/law firms	$12,250	Lawyers/law firms	$479,871	Misc. business	$500
Industrial unions	$10,000	Health professionals	$447,415		
General contractors	$7,500	Real estate	$412,394		
Automotive	$5,000	Health services/HMOs	$396,132		
Public sector unions	$5,000	Leadership PACs	$394,550		
High-tech industry	$4,900	Oil & gas	$391,878		
Source: OpenSecrets

=== Predictions ===
Source	Ranking	As of
The Cook Political Report	Solid R	November 1, 2012
Sabato's Crystal Ball	Safe R	November 5, 2012
Rothenberg Political Report	Safe R	November 2, 2012
Real Clear Politics	Safe R	November 5, 2012

=== Polling ===
Poll source	Date(s) administered	Sample size	Margin of error	Orrin Hatch (R)	Scott Howell (D)	Other/ Undecided
Deseret News/KSL-TV	June 15–21, 2012	1,228	±2.8%	63%	29%	8%
Utah State University	October 8–13, 2012	n/a	±7.6%	67%	24%	9%
Key Research	October 9–13, 2012	500	±4.4%	61%	22%	17%
Deseret News/KSL	October 26 – November 1, 2012	870	±3.4%	63%	26%	11%

Hypothetical polling

with Dan Liljenquist

Poll source	Date(s) administered	Sample size	Margin of error	Dan Liljenquist (R)	Scott Howell (D)	Other/ Undecided
Deseret News/KSL-TV	June 15–21, 2012	1228	±2.8%	48%	34%	18%

with Jason Chaffetz

Poll source	Date(s) administered	Sample size	Margin of error	Jason Chaffetz (R)	Jan Graham (D)	Undecided
Public Policy Polling	July 8–10, 2011	732	±3.6%	53%	34%	14%

Poll source	Date(s) administered	Sample size	Margin of error	Jason Chaffetz (R)	Sam Granato (D)	Undecided
Public Policy Polling	July 8–10, 2011	732	±3.6%	54%	33%	14%

Poll source	Date(s) administered	Sample size	Margin of error	Jason Chaffetz (R)	Jim Matheson (D)	Undecided
Deseret News/KSL-TV	June 13–16, 2011	406	±5.0%	46%	45%	8%
Public Policy Polling	July 8–10, 2011	732	±3.6%	42%	47%	11%
Mason-Dixon	August 8–10, 2011	625	±4.0%	49%	43%	8%

with Orrin Hatch

Poll source	Date(s) administered	Sample size	Margin of error	Orrin Hatch (R)	Jim Matheson (D)	Undecided
Deseret News/KSL-TV	June 13–16, 2011	406	±5.0%	47%	47%	6%
Public Policy Polling	July 8–10, 2011	732	±3.6%	44%	45%	11%
Mason-Dixon	August 8–10, 2011	625	±4.0%	48%	43%	9%

Poll source	Date(s) administered	Sample size	Margin of error	Orrin Hatch (R)	Jan Graham (D)	Undecided
Public Policy Polling	July 8–10, 2011	732	±3.6%	55%	34%	12%

Poll source	Date(s) administered	Sample size	Margin of error	Orrin Hatch (R)	Sam Granato (D)	Undecided
Public Policy Polling	July 8–10, 2011	732	±3.6%	56%	31%	13%

Republican primary

Poll source	Date(s) administered	Sample size	Margin of error	Orrin Hatch	Jason Chaffetz	Undecided
Deseret News/KSL-TV	June 13–16, 2011	406	±5.0%	47%	44%	10%
Public Policy Polling	July 8–10, 2011	406	±4.9%	43%	47%	10%
Mason-Dixon	August 8–10, 2011	305	±5.7%	49%	39%	12%

=== Results ===
United States Senate election in Utah, 2012
Party	Candidate	Votes	%	±%
Republican	Orrin Hatch (incumbent)	657,608	65.31%	+2.95%
Democratic	Scott Howell	301,873	29.98%	−1.08%
Constitution	Shaun McCausland	31,905	3.17%	−0.60%
Justice	Daniel Geery	8,342	0.83%	N/A
Independent	Bill Barron	7,172	0.71%	N/A
Total votes		1,006,901	100.0%	N/A
Republican hold				

==== By congressional district ====
Hatch won all four congressional districts, including one that elected a Democrat.

District	Hatch	Howell	Representative
1st	69.84%	25.63%	Rob Bishop
2nd	60.84%	33.85%	Chris Stewart
3rd	70.35%	25.14%	Jason Chaffetz
4th	59.92%	35.62%	Jim Matheson

== See also ==
- 2012 United States Senate elections
- 2012 United States House of Representatives elections in Utah
- 2012 Utah gubernatorial election
