= Bryan Young (filmmaker) =

American blogger, author and filmmaker (born 1980)

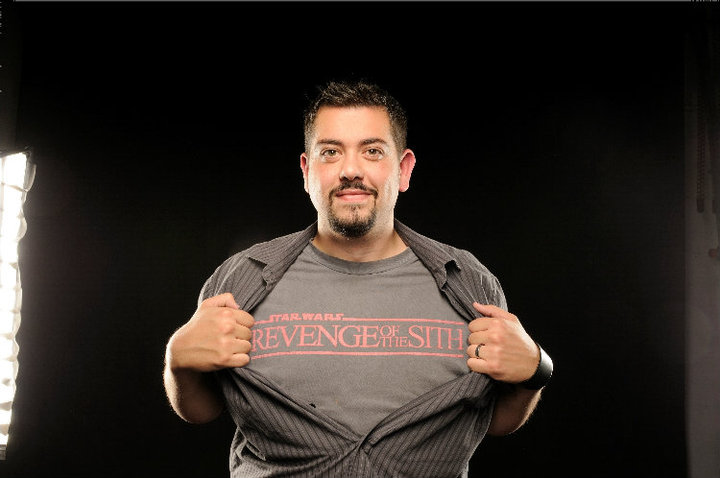
- Young in 2011
- Born: July 17, 1980 (age 45); Luke Air Force Base, Arizona, United States
- Occupations: Blogger, author, and filmmaker.
- Years active: 1999–present
- Spouses: Amberley Marie Young (2001–2021)

Bryan Young (born July 17, 1980) is an American blogger, author and filmmaker.

== Biography ==
At age 18, Young received local press coverage when he became the first person in the city of Provo, Utah, to get in line for the opening of Star Wars: Episode I – The Phantom Menace. Three years later, he repeated the stunt, camping out at the cinema three weeks before the opening of Star Wars: Episode II – Attack of the Clones.

Young was inducted as an honorary member of the 501st Legion.

== Film ==
Young co-directed two feature films, Missy and The Fleapit Three, and a feature-length documentary, The Misbehavers. He collaborated with director and friend Steven Greenstreet on a pair of documentaries, serving as assistant director for This Divided State and producing Killer at Large.

His short film 3 1/2 Stars won Best Writing at the Helper Film Festival.

== Writing ==
In collaboration with Elias Pate and Derek Hunter, Young contributed to the comic book series Pirate Club, released quarterly by Slave Labor Graphics. He's contributed essays to Marvel's Star Wars: Age of Republic comics.

His self-published novel Lost at the Con, as well as Operation Montauk, The Serpent's Head, and The Aeronaut from Silence in the Library publishing received positive reviews. A short story was also included in the anthology A Hero by Any Other Name.

He has freelanced for Star Wars Insider, the official Star Wars blog, HuffPost, Salt Lake City Weekly, and "geek news and reviews" blog Big Shiny Robot!, which he co-founded.

It was announced at New York Comic Con that he would be co-writing the Robotech role-playing game. This project drew attention when it was announced that the game would use gender neutral language.

His novel in the BattleTech universe, Honor's Gauntlet, won the Diamond Quill award in 2021.
