= Orrin Hatch =

American politician (1934–2022)

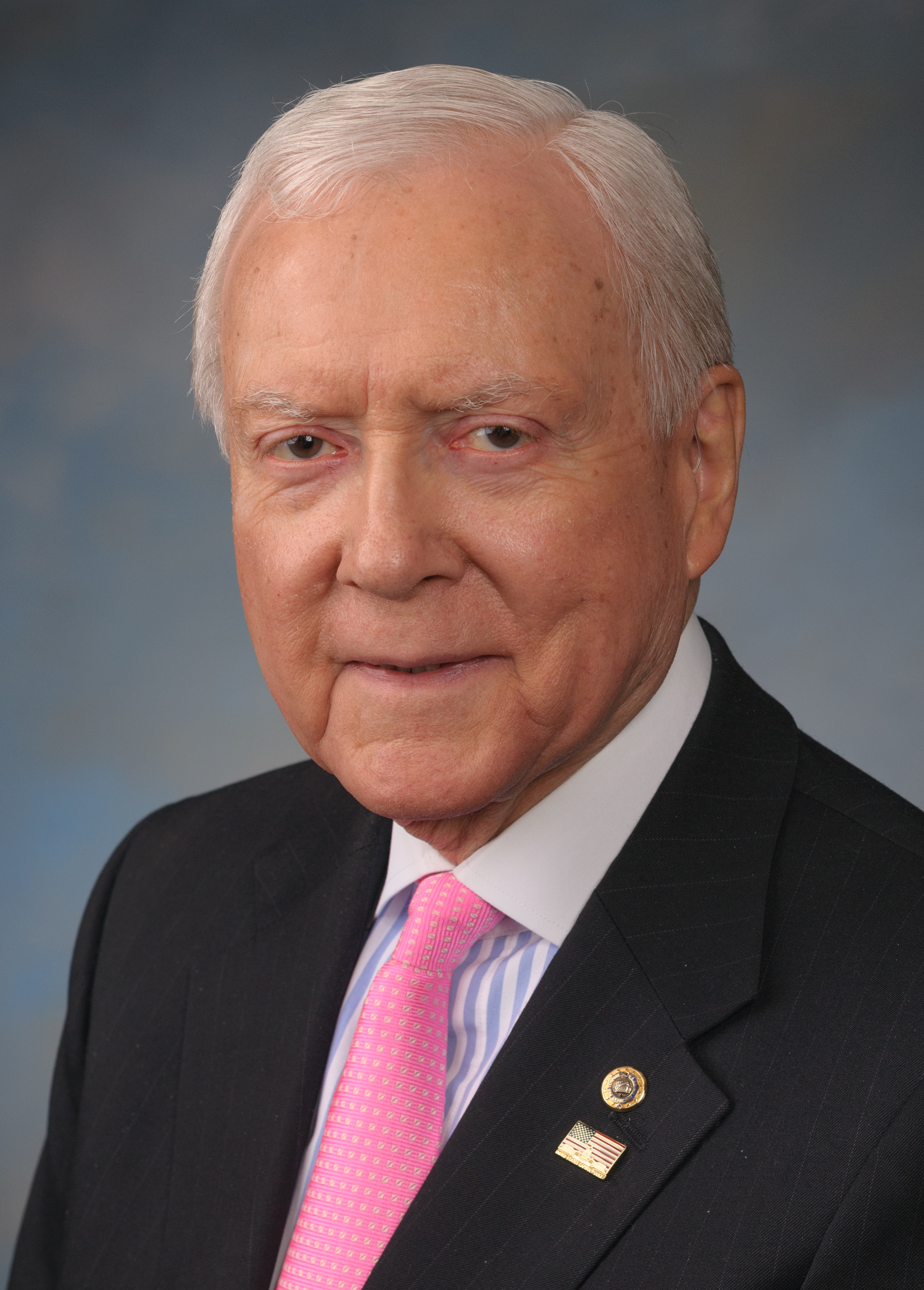
- Official portrait, 2015

President pro tempore of the United States Senate
- In office January 3, 2015 – January 3, 2019
- Preceded by: Patrick Leahy
- Succeeded by: Chuck Grassley

United States Senator from Utah
- In office January 3, 1977 – January 3, 2019
- Preceded by: Frank Moss
- Succeeded by: Mitt Romney
Senate positions
Chair of the Senate Finance Committee
In office January 3, 2015 – January 3, 2019
Preceded by	Ron Wyden
Succeeded by	Chuck Grassley
Ranking Member of the Senate Finance Committee
In office January 3, 2011 – January 3, 2015
Preceded by	Chuck Grassley
Succeeded by	Ron Wyden
Chair of the Senate Judiciary Committee
In office January 3, 2003 – January 3, 2005
Preceded by	Patrick Leahy
Succeeded by	Arlen Specter
In office January 20, 2001 – June 3, 2001
Preceded by	Patrick Leahy
Succeeded by	Patrick Leahy
In office January 3, 1995 – January 3, 2001
Preceded by	Joe Biden
Succeeded by	Patrick Leahy
Ranking Member of the Senate Judiciary Committee
In office June 3, 2001 – January 3, 2003
Preceded by	Patrick Leahy
Succeeded by	Patrick Leahy
In office January 3, 2001 – January 20, 2001
Preceded by	Patrick Leahy
Succeeded by	Patrick Leahy
In office January 3, 1993 – January 3, 1995
Preceded by	Strom Thurmond
Succeeded by	Joe Biden
Chair of the Senate Labor and Human Resources Committee
In office January 3, 1981 – January 3, 1987
Preceded by	Pete Williams
Succeeded by	Ted Kennedy
Ranking Member of the Senate Labor and Human Resources Committee
In office January 3, 1987 – January 3, 1993
Preceded by	Ted Kennedy
Succeeded by	Nancy Kassebaum

Personal details
- Born: Orrin Grant Hatch; March 22, 1934 Homestead, Pennsylvania, U.S.
- Died: April 23, 2022 (aged 88) Salt Lake City, Utah, U.S.
- Party: Republican
- Spouse: Elaine Hansen (m. 1957)
- Children: 6
- Education: Brigham Young University (BA); University of Pittsburgh (JD)
- Awards: Presidential Medal of Freedom (2018); Canterbury Medal (2020)
- Orrin Hatch's voice Orrin Hatch on his relationship with Ted Kennedy; Recorded September 10, 2009

Orrin Grant Hatch (March 22, 1934 – April 23, 2022) was an American attorney and politician who served as a United States senator from Utah from 1977 to 2019. Hatch's 42-year Senate tenure made him the longest-serving Republican U.S. senator in history, overtaking Ted Stevens, until Chuck Grassley surpassed him in 2023.

Hatch chaired the Senate Committee on Health, Education, Labor, and Pensions from 1981 to 1987. He served as chair of the Senate Judiciary Committee from 1995 to 2001 and from 2003 to 2005. On January 3, 2015, after the 114th United States Congress was sworn in, he became president pro tempore of the Senate. He was chair of the Senate Finance Committee from 2015 to 2019, and led efforts to pass the Tax Cuts and Jobs Act of 2017.

== Early life and education ==
Orrin Grant Hatch was born in Homestead, Pennsylvania, a suburb of Pittsburgh. He was the son of Jesse Hatch (1904–1992), a metal lather, and his wife Helen Frances Hatch (née Kamm; 1906–1995). Hatch had eight brothers and sisters, two of whom died during infancy. Hatch was profoundly affected by the loss of his older brother Jesse, a U.S. Army Air Forces nose turret gunner with the 725th Bombardment Squadron who was killed on February 7, 1945, when the B-24 he was aboard was shot down over German Austria.

Hatch, who grew up in poverty, was the first in his family to attend college; he attended Brigham Young University and earned a Bachelor of Arts in history in 1959. He also fought 11 bouts as an amateur boxer. In 1962, Hatch received a Juris Doctor from the University of Pittsburgh School of Law. Hatch has stated that during law school, he and his young family resided in a refurbished chicken coop behind his parents' house. Hatch worked as an attorney in Pittsburgh and moved to Utah in 1969, where he continued to practice law.

== Elections ==
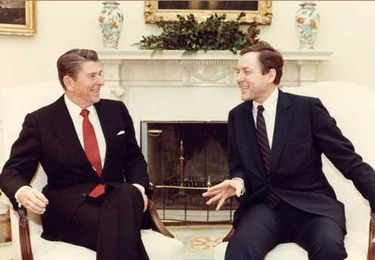
Hatch with President Ronald Reagan

In 1976, in his first run for public office, Hatch was elected to the United States Senate, defeating Democrat Frank Moss, a three-term incumbent. Hatch criticized Moss's 18-year tenure in the Senate, saying, "What do you call a Senator who's served in office for 18 years? You call him home." Hatch ran on the promise of term limits and argued that many senators, including Moss, had lost touch with their constituents.

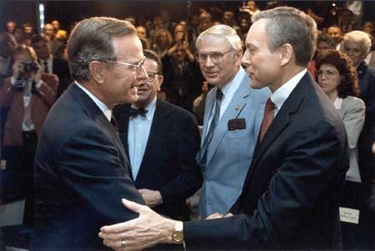
Hatch greeting President George H. W. Bush

In 1982, Hatch won re-election, defeating Ted Wilson, the mayor of Salt Lake City, by 17 points. He defeated Brian Moss (Frank Moss' son) by 35 points in 1988 and was re-elected in 1994, 2000, 2006, and 2012.

Hatch's presidential campaign logo

In 2000, Hatch campaigned for the Republican Party nomination for president. After finishing last in the Iowa caucuses, Hatch withdrew his candidacy on January 27, 2000, and endorsed the eventual winner George W. Bush.

=== 2012 Senate election ===
After the defeat of Utah's Senator Bob Bennett in 2010, conjecture began as to whether six-term Senator Hatch would retire in 2012. It was also speculated that Congressman Jason Chaffetz would run against Hatch, though Chaffetz would later decline. In January 2011, Hatch announced his campaign for re-election. Later, nine other Republicans, including former State Senator Dan Liljenquist and then-State Legislator Chris Herrod, declared campaigns for U.S. Senator.

Having elected state delegates in mid-March, both the Democratic and Republican parties held conventions on April 21, with the possibilities to determine their nominees for the November general election. At the Republican convention, Hatch failed to get the 60% vote needed to clinch the Republican nomination, so he faced Liljenquist (the second-place finisher) in the June 26 primary. Hatch won the primary easily. It was Hatch's first primary competition since his election in 1976. The Democratic convention chose former state senator and IBM executive Scott Howell as the Democratic Party candidate. Hatch defeated Howell, receiving 65.2% of the vote to Howell's 30.2%.

=== 2016 presidential endorsements ===
In the 2016 presidential election, Hatch originally supported former Florida Governor Jeb Bush and later endorsed Florida Senator Marco Rubio once Bush ended his campaign. On May 12, 2016, after Donald Trump became the presumptive Republican presidential nominee, Hatch endorsed him. On May 27, 2016, after Trump suggested that a federal judge Gonzalo P. Curiel was biased against Trump because of his Mexican heritage, Hatch said: "From what I know about Trump, he's not a racist but he does make a lot of outrageous statements ... I think you can criticize a judge but it ought to be done in a formal way" and said that Trump's statements were not so inappropriate that he would rescind his support. On October 7, 2016, following the Donald Trump Access Hollywood controversy, Hatch described Trump's comments as "offensive and disgusting" and said that "[there] is no excuse for such degrading behavior. All women deserve to be treated with respect." Hatch maintained his endorsement of Trump's candidacy.

== U.S. Senate tenure ==
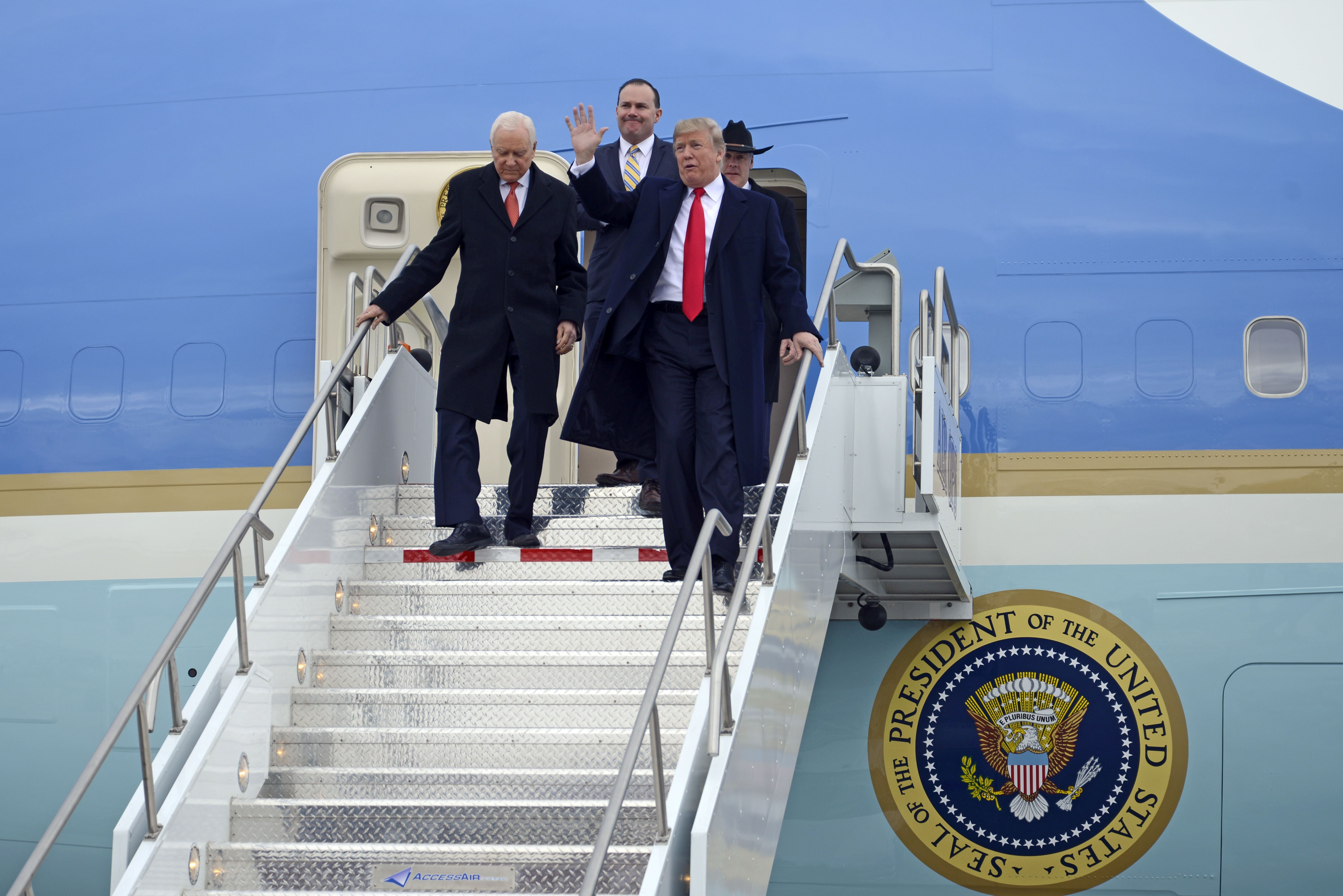
Hatch with President Donald Trump and Senator Mike Lee in 2017

Hatch took office as a U.S. senator on January 3, 1977. He chaired the Senate Committee on Health, Education, Labor, and Pensions from 1981 to 1987. He also served as chair of the Senate Judiciary Committee and the Senate Finance Committee.

In September 1989, Hatch was one of nine Republican senators appointed by Senate Republican Leader Bob Dole to negotiate a dispute with Democrats over the financing of President George HW Bush's anti-drug plan that called for spending $7.8 billion by the following year as part of the president's efforts to address narcotics nationwide and abroad.

Hatch long expressed interest in serving on the U.S. Supreme Court. It was reported that he was on Ronald Reagan's short list of candidates to succeed Lewis F. Powell Jr. on the Supreme Court, but was passed over at least in part because of the Ineligibility Clause. Despite that, he vocally supported Robert Bork, who was nominated for the vacancy instead.

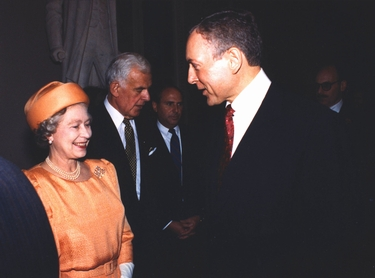
Hatch meeting Queen Elizabeth II in 1991

Hatch "worked across the aisle to pass landmark legislation, including the Americans with Disabilities Act and the Children's Health Insurance Program". During the 1991 confirmation hearings regarding the Supreme Court nomination of Clarence Thomas, Hatch "famously defended Thomas ... by reading aloud from The Exorcist to suggest Anita Hill lifted details of her sexual harassment allegations from the horror book".

On January 3, 2015, after the 114th Congress was sworn in, Hatch became President pro tempore of the Senate.

Hatch was absent from the 2017 Inauguration Day festivities. At the request of President-elect Donald Trump, he agreed to serve as designated survivor during the inauguration and was kept at a secure, undisclosed location.

On December 25, 2017, The Salt Lake Tribune published an editorial entitled "Why Orrin Hatch is Utahn of the Year". The newspaper described its criteria for the designation as "Utahn of the Year" as "the Utahn who, over the past 12 months, has done the most. Has made the most news. Has had the biggest impact. For good or for ill." The editorial criticized Hatch for his role in the size reduction of the Grand Staircase–Escalante National Monument and the passage of the Tax Cuts and Jobs Act of 2017 and accused him of lacking integrity.

Hatch announced on January 2, 2018, that he would retire from the Senate instead of seeking re-election that November. Hatch retired from the Senate on January 3, 2019, having served there for 42 years. At the time of his retirement announcement, he was the longest-serving U.S. Senator in Utah history (having eclipsed previous record-holder Reed Smoot in 2007), the longest-serving Republican U.S. Senator in the history of Congress, and also one of the longest-serving Republican members of Congress in the history of the United States. In the latter distinction, Hatch was surpassed in length of service by fellow senators Ted Stevens, Chuck Grassley and Representative Don Young.

=== Political positions and votes ===
==== Abortion ====
Hatch was strongly opposed to abortion and is the author of the Hatch Amendment proposed to the U.S. Constitution, which states that there is no constitutional right to abortion and would empower the states to restrict abortion as they see fit.

==== Anti-terrorism ====
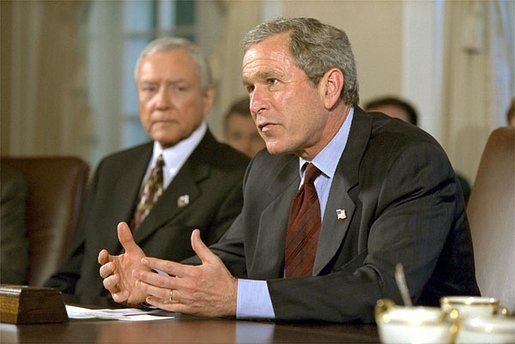
Hatch visits at the White House with President George W. Bush following the September 11 attacks.

In 1995, Hatch was the leading figure behind the Senate's anti-terrorism bill, to a large extent a response to the Oklahoma City Bombing. Elements of the bill were criticised by the Anti-Defamation League and American Jewish Committee on civil liberties grounds, especially the new limits imposed on habeas corpus in capital cases.

As a senior member of the Senate Select Intelligence Committee, Hatch was also instrumental in the 2008 extension of the Foreign Intelligence Surveillance Act. He said, "This bipartisan bill will help defeat terrorism and keep America safe. No, the legislation is not perfect, but it ensures that the increased expansion of the judiciary into foreign intelligence gathering doesn't unnecessarily hamper our intelligence community."

==== Bailouts ====
Hatch voted in favor of the 2008 legislation that established the Troubled Asset Relief Program (TARP). In 2011, Hatch said that he "probably made a mistake voting for it", and also claimed "at the time, we were in real trouble and it looked like we were ready for a depression. I believe we would have gone into a depression." He voted against the renewal of TARP in 2009, and the renewal was voted down by 10 votes in the Senate.

Hatch voted in favor of the Housing and Economic Recovery Act of 2008. The bill authorized $300 billion to guarantee mortgages and restore confidence in Fannie Mae and Freddie Mac.

==== Balanced budget amendment ====
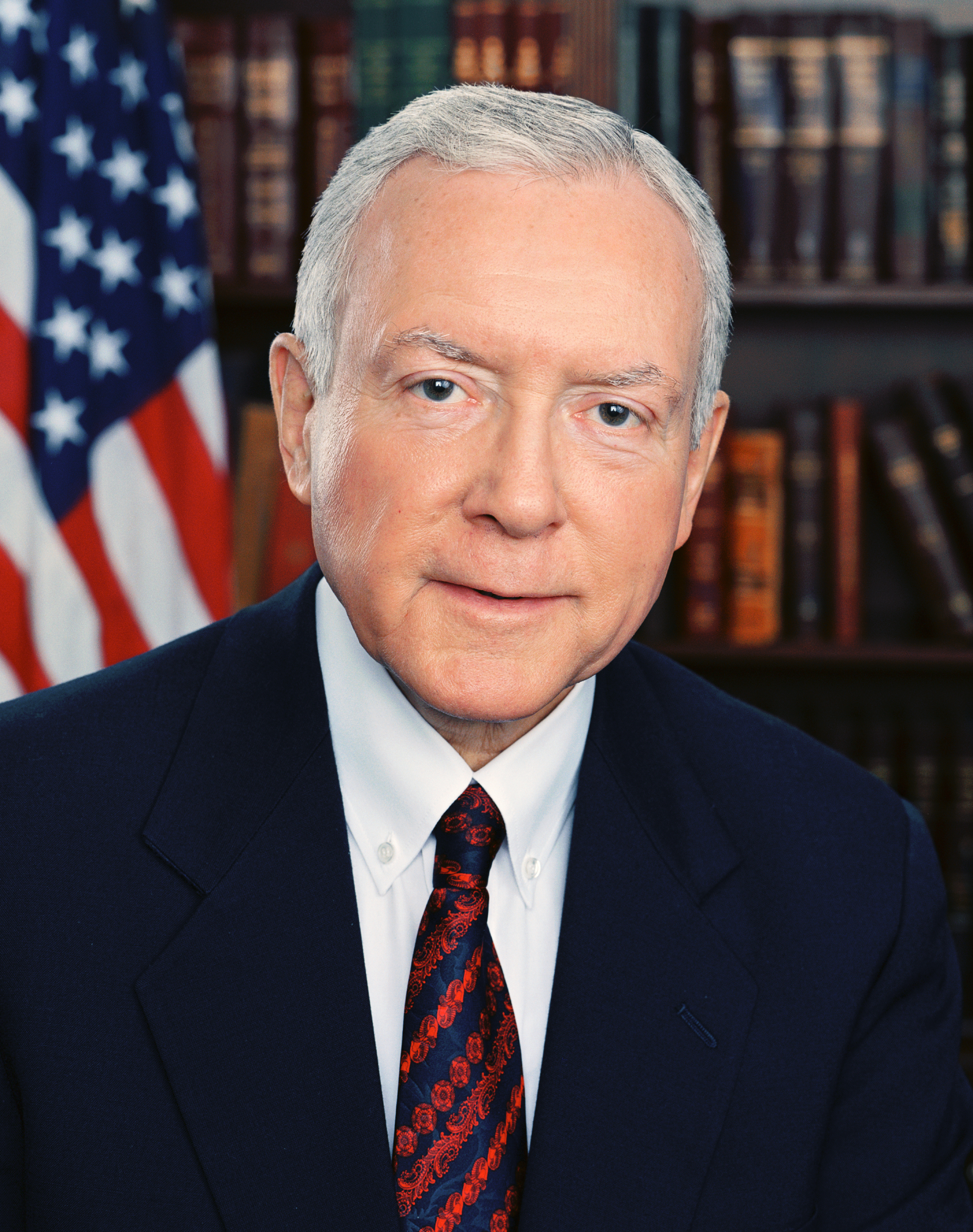
Hatch during the 109th United States Congress

Hatch was a longtime advocate of amending the United States Constitution to require that total spending of the federal government for any fiscal year not exceed total receipts.

During his time in the Senate, Hatch sponsored a balanced budget amendment 17 times—4 times as lead sponsor and 13 times as a co-sponsor. He also voted in favor of passing a Balanced Budget Amendment on at least nine occasions. Hatch's proposed amendment passed the House of Representatives in 1997, but failed to pass the Senate by the required two-thirds majority by one vote to move on the states for ratification.

==== Bank of Credit and Commerce International ====
In January 1990, the federal judge in a case against the Bank of Credit and Commerce International (BCCI) accepted a 1989 plea bargain offered to the bank by the U.S. Department of Justice. The bank was to pay $15 million in fines and only admit that it had laundered drug money. Afterward, Hatch presented an impassioned defense of the bank in a speech on the Senate floor. It had been largely written for him by the bank's attorney Robert Altman. Hatch said, "The case arose from the conduct of a small number of B.C.C.I.'s more than 14,000 employees." Since 1989, Hatch and his aide, Michael Pillsbury, had been involved in efforts to counter the negative publicity that surrounded the bank. Hatch had also solicited the bank to approve a $10 million loan to a close friend, Monzer Hourani. In 1991, B.C.C.I. was shut down after regulators accused it of one of the biggest international financial frauds in history. Law enforcement officials accused the bank of making bribes throughout the third world to arrange government deposits. Clark Clifford, a former presidential advisor and Defense Secretary, and Altman, his law partner, were charged with taking bribes from B.C.C.I., in exchange for concealing its illegal ownership of First American Bankshares, a Washington holding company which Clifford chaired. Both had denied the charges, which were filed in New York State and Federal courts. In 1992, in a "Report to the Committee on Foreign Relations of the United States Senate", prepared by committee members, U.S. Senators John Kerry (D-MA) and Hank Brown (R-CO), noted that a key strategy of "BCCI's successful secret acquisitions of U.S. banks in the face of regulatory suspicion was its aggressive use of a series of prominent Americans," Clifford amongst them. The relationship with Hourani included the receipt of campaign contributions laundered through his employees, for which Hourani was fined $10,000, as well as his purchase of 1,200 CDs of Hatch's songs, for which Hatch received $3 to $7 each, and the management of a blind trust for Hatch. These led to a Senate Ethics Committee investigation, by which Hatch was eventually cleared.

==== Health care reform ====
Hatch opposed President Barack Obama's health reform legislation; he voted against the Affordable Care Act in December 2009, and he voted against the Health Care and Education Reconciliation Act of 2010. Hatch argued that the insurance mandate found in the legislation was not in the category that can be covered by the interstate commerce clause since it regulates the decision to engage in commercial activity rather than regulating the activity itself. He therefore regarded the Act as unconstitutional. NPR called Hatch a "flip-flopper" on this issue since in 1993 Hatch co-sponsored a bill along with 19 other Senate Republicans that included an individual insurance mandate as a means to combat healthcare legislation proposed by New York Senator Hillary Clinton. In 2018, Hatch said that Obamacare supporters were "the stupidest, dumbass people I've ever met".

Hatch was one of the first senators to suggest that the individual mandate was unconstitutional and promised to work on dismantling it if he became the Finance Committee Chairman. Hatch was part of the group of 13 senators drafting the Senate version of the AHCA behind closed doors.

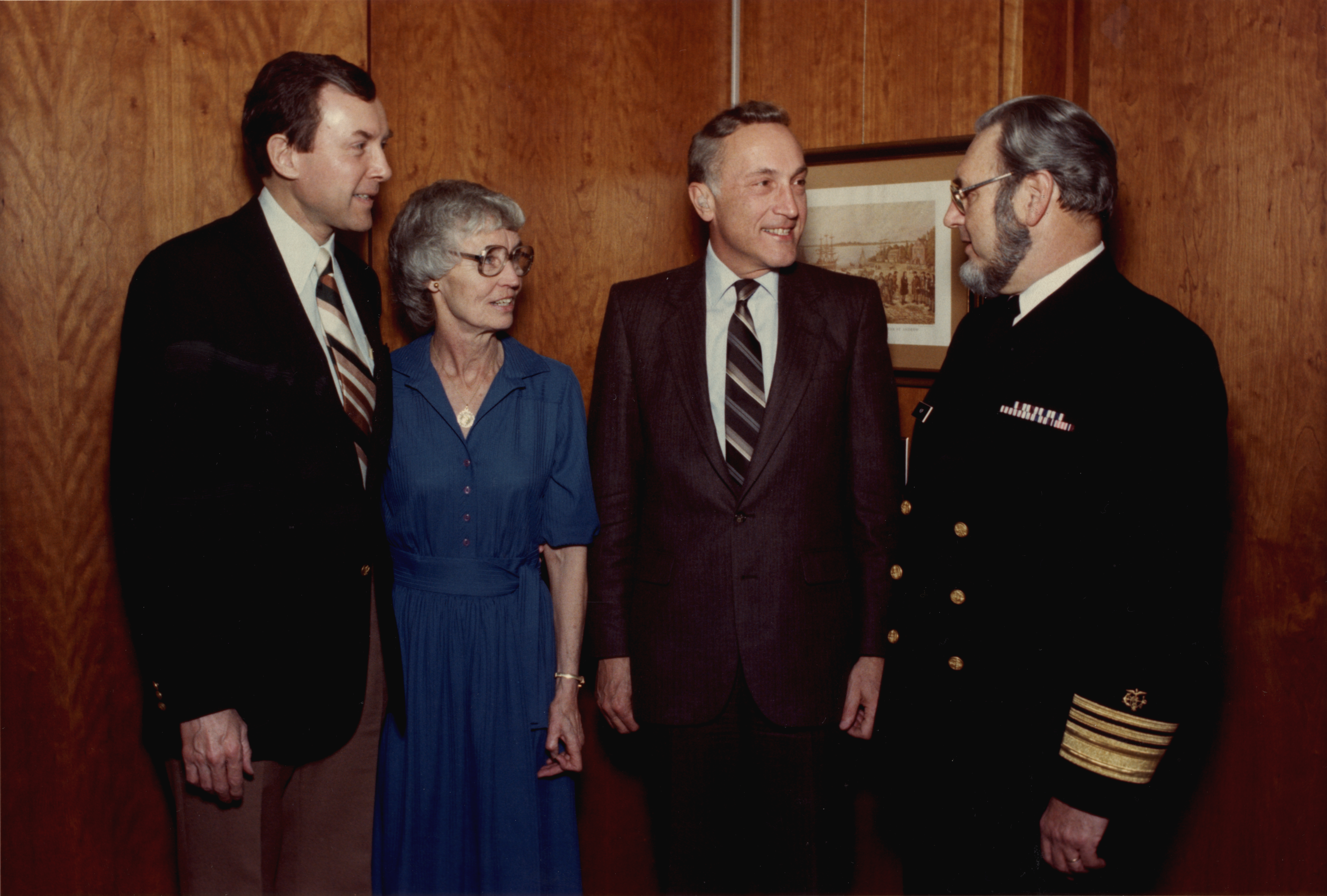
Hatch with Surgeon General of the United States, Dr. C. Everett Koop (far right), Elizabeth Koop (left), and HHS Secretary Richard Schweiker (right) (November 16, 1981)

In 2003, Hatch supported the Medicare prescription drug benefit plan known as Medicare Part D. Responding to criticism of the legislation during the 2009 debate on health care reform, Hatch said that in 2003 "it was standard practice not to pay for things" and that although there was concern at the time about increasing the deficit, supporting the bill was justified because it "has done a lot of good".

On March 25, 2014, Hatch cosponsored the Emergency Medical Services for Children Reauthorization Act of 2014 in the Senate. The bill that would amend the Public Health Service Act to reauthorize the Emergency Medical Services for Children Program through FY2019. The bill would authorize appropriations of about $20 million in 2015 and $101 million over the 2015–2019 period. Hatch argued that "children require specialized medical care, and that specialized care comes with unique challenges. The EMSC program helps ensure that some of our country's most vulnerable have access to the care they need, and I've been proud to support it all these years."

==== Immigration ====
Hatch was one of the architects and advocates of the expansion of H-1B visas and has generally been an advocate of tougher enforcement immigration policy including voting for 1,500 new law enforcement agents to patrol the United States' borders. His 2010 Immigration Bill titled Strengthening Our Commitment to Legal Immigration and America's Security Act has received the support of the Center for Immigration Studies (CIS). He also proposed the DREAM Act, which would provide a pathway to citizenship for the children of undocumented immigrants, who were children when their parents came to the United States.

Hatch critiqued President Donald Trump's 2017 executive order to temporarily suspend immigration from seven Muslim countries until better screening methods are devised. He reflected on his own family's immigration history and described the order as placing "unnecessary burdens" on families.

==== Judicial nominations ====
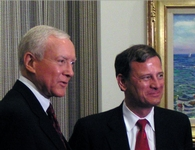
Hatch with John Roberts in 2005

As ranking minority member of the Senate Judiciary Committee, Hatch fought hard to get conservative judges nominated to the Supreme Court. He took a leading role in the Senate confirmation hearings of Clarence Thomas in October 1991. He was also a strong supporter of Jay Bybee during Bybee's confirmation hearings for a seat on the United States Court of Appeals for the Ninth Circuit, stating "I've seen a lot of people around and a lot of judges and I don't know of anybody who has any greater qualifications or any greater ability in the law than you have."

Nevertheless, in 1993, Hatch recommended Ruth Bader Ginsburg, whom he knew personally, to President Bill Clinton to fill a vacancy on the U.S. Supreme Court, even as he knew she was a political liberal. Clinton had not previously considered Ginsburg, and Hatch, as ranking member of the Senate Judiciary Committee, assured him that a Ginsburg confirmation would go smoothly. Ginsburg was ultimately confirmed 96–3 in the Senate.

With regards to the Senate filibuster being used to stall President Barack Obama's judicial appointments, Hatch voted against the November 2013 reforms, which eliminated the use of the filibuster on executive branch nominees and judicial nominees other than to the Supreme Court. In September 2014, Hatch argued that the filibuster should be restored, saying: "We should get it back to where it was. You can see the destruction that has happened around here." In November 2014, after the Republicans retook control of the Senate following the 2014 elections, Hatch wrote in The Wall Street Journal that "if Republicans re-establish the judicial-nomination filibuster, it would remain in place only until the moment that a new Democratic majority decided that discarding the rule again would be useful" and called for "the next Republican president to counteract President Obama's aggressive efforts to stack the federal courts in favor of his party's ideological agenda" by nominating conservative judges.

As an opponent of the confirmation of Merrick Garland, Hatch submitted to the Deseret News an opinion piece stating that, after meeting with Garland, his opinion on blocking Garland had not changed; the piece was published prior to Hatch's meeting with Garland. On March 13, 2016, regarding the nomination of Supreme Court candidates by Obama, Hatch stated "a number of factors have led me to conclude that under current circumstances the Senate should defer the confirmation process until the next president is sworn in."

==== Intellectual property ====
Hatch was long a proponent of expanding intellectual property rights and in 1997 introduced the Senate version of the Copyright Term Extension Act. Hatch believed that intellectual property laws should, in general, more closely mirror real property laws, and offer greater protections to authors and creators.

Hatch caused an overnight controversy on June 17, 2003, by proposing that copyright owners should be able to destroy the computer equipment and information of those suspected of copyright infringement, including file sharing, he stated that "This may be the only way you can teach somebody about copyrights." In the face of criticism, especially from technology and privacy advocates, Hatch withdrew his suggestion days later, after it was discovered that Sen. Hatch's official website was using an unlicensed JavaScript menu from United Kingdom-based software developer Milonic Solutions. Milonic founder Andy Woolley stated that "We've had no contact with them. They are in breach of our licensing terms." Shortly after the publication of that story in Wired magazine, the company that runs Hatch's website contacted Milonic to start registration.

On September 20, 2010, Hatch once again attempted to outlaw websites which could be used for trademark and copyright infringement through the Combating Online Infringement and Counterfeits Act (COICA). This bill would authorize the United States Department of Justice to blacklist and censor all websites that the department deemed to be dedicated to "infringing activities".

==== LGBT rights ====
The Salt Lake Tribune reported that in 1977, Hatch told students from the University of Utah, "I wouldn't want to see homosexuals teaching school anymore than I'd want to see members of the American Nazi Party teaching school." Hatch supported the Defense of Marriage Act in 1996.

In 2012, Hatch recommended and supported District Court Judge Robert Shelby, a Barack Obama appointee, though Utah Senator Mike Lee voted against him in the Judiciary Committee. In 2013 Shelby overturned Utah's ballot Amendment 3, which constitutionally defined marriage as between a man and a woman.

In April 2013, Hatch stated that he viewed same-sex marriage as "undermining the very basis of marital law", but declined to support a Federal Marriage Amendment and endorsed same-sex couples' right to form a civil union, stating that the law should "give gay people the same rights as married people". Later that same year, Hatch voted in favor of the Employment Non-Discrimination Act, legislation creating protected classes for those identifying as gay, lesbian, bisexual or transgender. In 2018, Hatch "honored Pride" by giving a speech in support of programs to help and serve LGBT youth.

==== Nuclear testing ====
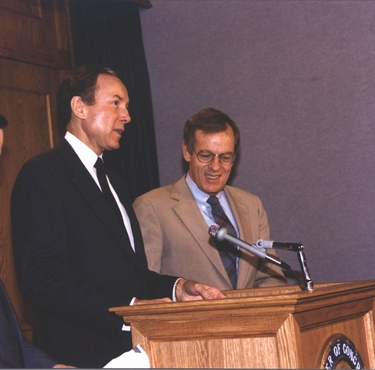
Hatch holds a press conference with Representative Wayne Owens in March 1989 as part of their successful charge to win passage of the Radiation Exposure Compensation Act (RECA).

During Hatch's first year in the Senate in 1977, reporter Gordon Eliot White of the Deseret News published the first of what would be a lengthy series of articles detailing government malfeasance in atmospheric testing of nuclear bombs at the Nevada Test Site. Over the next 13 years White's articles detailed how the government determined to proceed with the tests, and with mining and refining, without adequate safeguards for innocent citizens whose health would be damaged. Though Hatch feared an investigation would endanger the nation's nuclear deterrence versus the Soviet Union and the People's Republic of China, by 1979 he was pushing for hearings on the issue before the Senate Labor Committee. Hatch prevailed on Committee Chairman Ted Kennedy to hold field hearings in Utah in 1980. At the end of 1980, Hatch was positioned to chair the committee himself.

By 1984, Hatch had held a dozen hearings, passed legislation requiring scientific investigation of the injuries, and enlisted the aid of the National Science Foundation and National Cancer Institute, but still could not muster the votes to get a bill passed. When a vote was obtained in the Senate in 1985 (as an amendment to a bill to compensate affected Pacific Islanders for nuclear tests in the 1950s), it failed by a handful of votes. Hatch discovered a clause in the proposed Treaty of Peace and Friendship with Kiribati and Tuvalu to pay at least $100 million to residents of the Marshall Islands for injuries similar to those of Utahns, and Hatch took the treaty hostage. His hold on consideration of the treaty eventually got agreement from the Reagan administration to agree not to oppose radiation compensation for Utah citizens, but it still took another five years to get the bill through. The Radiation Exposure Compensation Act of 1990 provided compensation for citizens injured by radioactive fallout from the tests.

In December 2010, Hatch was one of twenty-six senators who voted against the ratification of New Start, a nuclear arms reduction treaty between the United States and Russian Federation obliging both countries to have no more than 1,550 strategic warheads as well as 700 launchers deployed during the next seven years along with providing a continuation of on-site inspections that halted when START I expired the previous year. It was the first arms treaty with Russia in eight years.

==== Opioid crisis ====
Hatch introduced the Ensuring Patient Access and Effective Drug Enforcement Act, narrowing the broad authority of the DEA to suspend drug "manufacturers, distributors, and dispensers". Hatch stated the bill was also written to protect patients from disruptions in the production and delivery of their prescription drugs, saying that ..."The fact that prescription drugs can be abused should not prevent patients from receiving the medications they need. This bill takes a balanced approach to the problem of prescription drug abuse by clarifying penalties for manufacturing or dispensing outside approved procedures while helping to ensure that supply chains to legitimate users remain intact". The bill passed the Senate unanimously and Tom Marino passed a version of the bill in the House. It was then signed by President Barack Obama.

Critics of the bill claim the new law fuels the opioid crisis by limiting the DEA's ability to halt production and distribution by predatory drug companies. DEA Chief Administrative Law Judge John J. Mulrooney II wrote in the Marquette Law Review that ..."At a time when, by all accounts, opioid abuse, addiction and deaths were increasing markedly, this new law imposed a dramatic diminution of the agency's authority. It is now all but logically impossible for the DEA to suspend a drug company's operations for failing to comply with federal law." Donald Trump's Attorney General Jeff Sessions said he was "dubious" about the law when it passed and joined 44 state attorneys general calling for "repeal or amendment of the law to restore some of the DEA's authority." Jim Geldhof, a former DEA program manager who spent 43 years with the DEA called the bill "outrageous. It basically takes any kind of action DEA was going to do with a distributor or manufacturer as far as an immediate suspension off the table. And then the other part of that really infuriates me is that corrective action plan." Mulrooney compared the corrective action plan to one that would "allow bank robbers to round up and return inkstained money and agree not to rob any more banks—all before any of those wrongdoers actually admit fault and without any consequence that might deter such behavior in the future."

Hatch responded to a Washington Post and 60 Minutes investigation into the bill by writing a Washington Post opinion article calling the investigation "misleading" and asking to "leave conspiracy theories to Netflix". Senator Sheldon Whitehouse, a co-sponsor of the senate bill, also defended the bill: "This bill was drafted in consultation with the DEA to offer better guidance for companies working to safely and responsibly supply prescription drugs to pharmacies, and to promote better communication and certainty between companies and regulators." Republican Pat Toomey expressed doubts that a conspiracy existed, but still suggested amending the bill: "I'm a little surprised that it passed unanimously in both houses, was signed by President Obama and got no opposition from the DEA at the time. That's not the way controversial legislation usually ends up, but hey, if there's problems, then we ought to revisit them."

Hatch received $177,000 in donations from the drug industry while pushing the bill through and has received $2,178,863 from the Pharmaceuticals/Health Products industry from 1989 to 2014 according to required filings by the Federal Election Commission.

==== Religious freedom ====
Hatch was the main author of the Religious Land Use and Institutionalized Persons Act, which protected all religions' right to build facilities on private property. In 2010, Hatch defended the right of a private organization to build a mosque on private property in downtown Manhattan, citing this law and defense of the freedom of religion.

==== Presidential Medal of Freedom ====
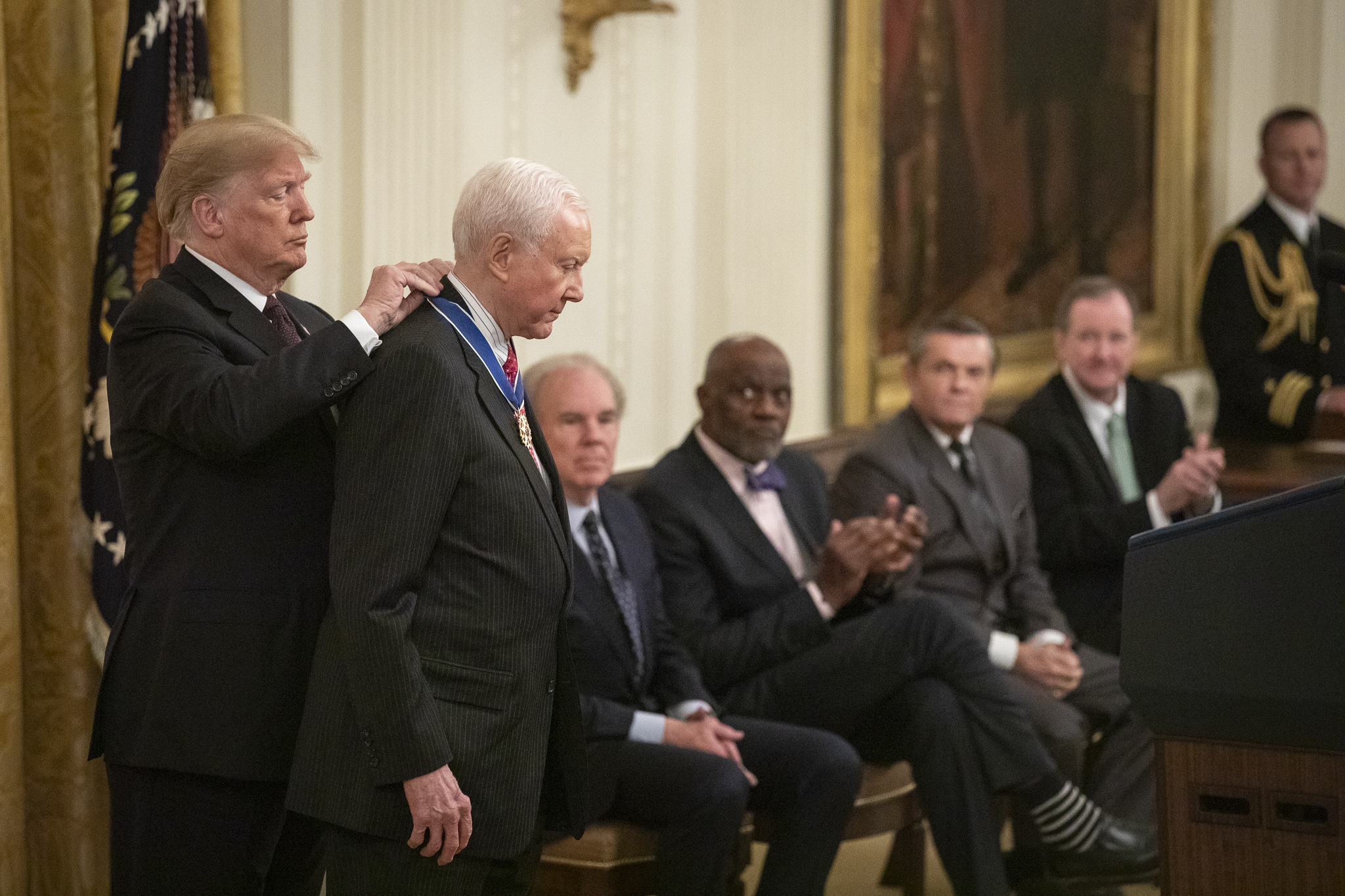
President Trump presenting the Medal of Freedom to Hatch

On November 16, 2018, President Donald Trump awarded Hatch the highest civilian honor, the Presidential Medal of Freedom.

==== Other issues ====
Hatch sponsored the Dietary Supplement Health and Education Act of 1994, which "all but eliminated government regulation of the dietary and herbal supplements industry." The bill has resulted in the unregulated sale of supplements with misleading labeling that have no beneficial health effects at all, or may have adverse health effects. It was intended to enable the marketing of quack medicine.

In 1999, Hatch called for a federal probe into manufacturers of violent video games, and proposed making the existing voluntary rating system for video games (ESRB) mandatory by federal law.

Hatch pushed legislation for the Equal Opportunity to Govern Amendment, which would amend Article 2, Section I, Clause 5 of the United States Constitution. This amendment would allow anyone who has been a U.S. citizen for twenty years to seek the presidency or vice-presidency.

A vocal supporter of stem cell research, Hatch was one of 58 senators who signed a letter directed to President George W. Bush, requesting the relaxing of federal restrictions on embryonic stem cell research. In 2010, Hatch's bill was reauthorized which allowed stem cells from umbilical cords to be used to find treatment options.

In June 2013, Hatch commented on a G8 proposal that tax authorities in the world's largest economies openly share information among themselves in order to fight tax evasion. The proposal has strong suggestions about ways to make companies more transparent and governments more accountable for their tax policies. Hatch stated that transparency is always a good thing, but he would like to see a bill before giving any support.

In 2017, Hatch was one of 22 senators to sign a letter to President Donald Trump urging the President to have the United States withdraw from the Paris Agreement. According to OpenSecrets, Hatch received over $470,000 from oil, gas, and coal interests from 2012 on.

In 2018, over the Judge Brett Kavanaugh U.S. Supreme Court controversy, Hatch said that it did not matter even if Kavanaugh did what his accusers alleged was true. Hatch said, "If that was true, I think it would be hard for senators to not consider who the judge is today. That's the issue. Is this judge a really good man? And he is. And by any measure he is."

Hatch voted for the impeachment of President Bill Clinton in 1999, saying "committing crimes of moral turpitude such as perjury and obstruction of justice go to the heart of qualification for public office ... This great nation can tolerate a president who makes mistakes. But it cannot tolerate one who makes a mistake and then breaks the law to cover it up. Any other citizen would be prosecuted for these crimes." In 2018, in the wake of court filings that implicated President Trump in campaign finance violations and in attempting to buy the silence of women who alleged affairs with Trump, Hatch said, "I don't care, all I can say is he's doing a good job as president."

In April 2018, Hatch was one of eight Republican senators to sign a letter to United States Secretary of the Treasury Steven Mnuchin and acting U.S. Secretary of State John Sullivan expressing "deep concern" over a report by the United Nations exposing "North Korean sanctions evasion involving Russia and China" and asserting that the findings "demonstrate an elaborate and alarming military-venture between rogue, tyrannical states to avoid United States and international sanctions and inflict terror and death upon thousands of innocent people" while calling it "imperative that the United States provides a swift and appropriate response to the continued use of chemical weapons used by President Assad and his forces, and works to address the shortcomings in sanctions enforcement."

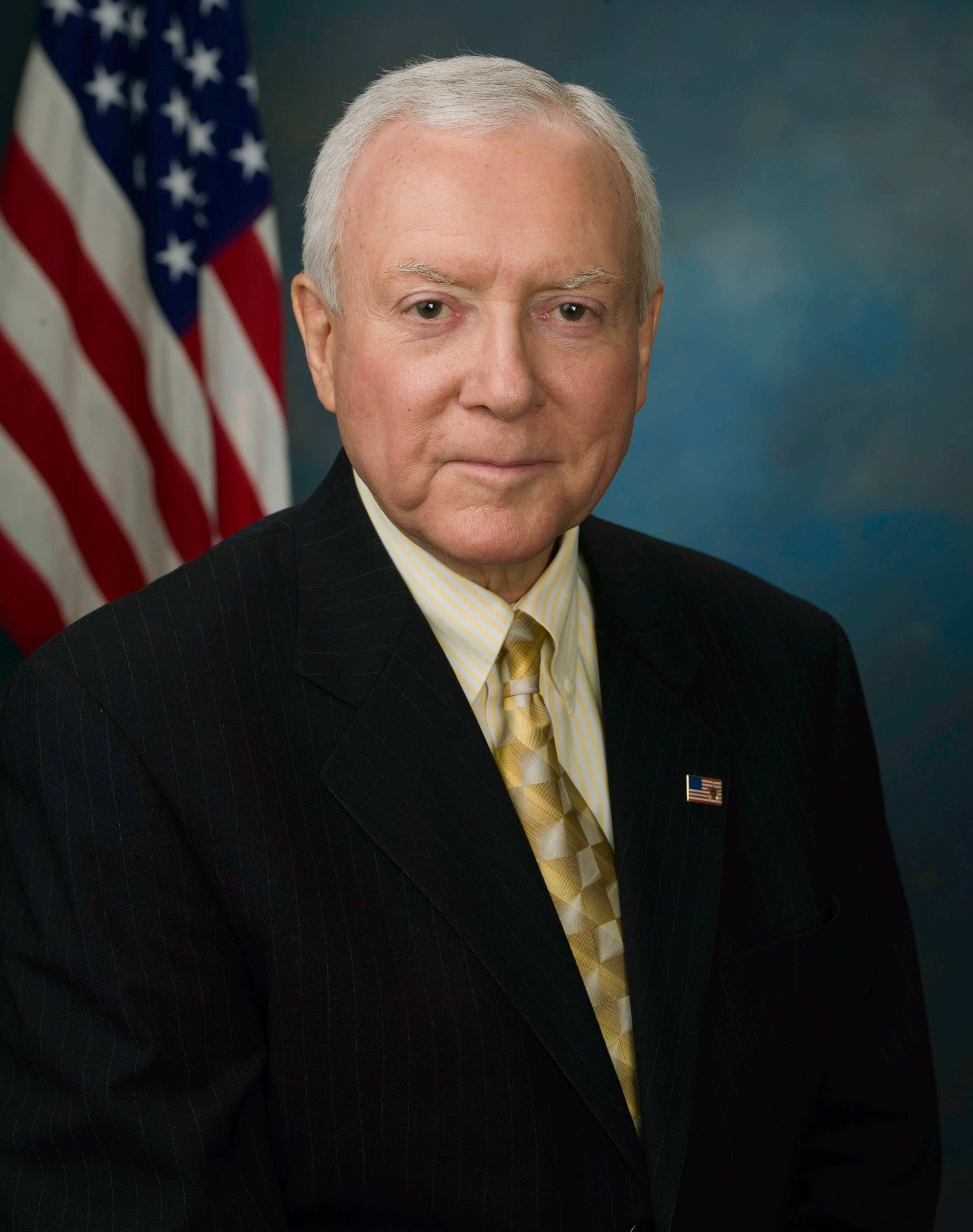
Hatch during the 110th United States Congress

=== Committee assignments ===
- Committee on Finance (chairman)
  - As chairman of the full committee, Hatch may serve as an ex officio member of all subcommittees of which he was not already a full member.
  - Subcommittee on International Trade, Customs, and Global Competitiveness
  - Subcommittee on Social Security, Pensions and Family Policy
- Committee on the Judiciary
  - Subcommittee on Antitrust, Competition Policy and Consumer Rights
  - Subcommittee on Crime and Drugs
  - Subcommittee on Terrorism, Technology and Homeland Security
- Committee on Health, Education, Labor, and Pensions
  - Subcommittee on Children and Families
  - Subcommittee on Employment and Workplace Safety
- Special Committee on Aging
- Joint Committee on Taxation
- Impeachment Trial Committee on the Articles against Judge G. Thomas Porteous Jr. (Vice Chair)

=== Caucus memberships ===
- Afterschool Caucuses

=== Lobbying ties ===
Hatch's son Scott Hatch was formerly a partner and registered lobbyist at Walker, Martin & Hatch LLC, a Washington D.C. lobbying firm. The firm was formed in 2001 with Jack Martin, a staff aide to Hatch for six years, and H. Laird Walker, described as a close associate of the senator. In March 2003, the Los Angeles Times reported that the firm was formed with Hatch's personal encouragement and that he saw no conflict of interest in working on issues that involved his son's clients. In 2009, The Washington Times reported that Hatch said "My son, Scott, does not lobby me or anyone in my office".

In March 2009, The Washington Times reported that the pharmaceutical industry, which has benefited from Hatch's legislative efforts, had previously unreported connections to Hatch. In 2007, five pharmaceutical companies and the industry's main trade association, Pharmaceutical Research and Manufacturers of America (PhRMA), donated $172,500 to the Utah Families Foundation—a charitable foundation which Hatch helped start in the 1990s and continued to support. Walker, Martin & Hatch LLC was paid $120,000 by PhRMA in 2007 to lobby Congress on pending U.S. Food and Drug Administration legislation. Hatch and his son also had close ties to the dietary supplement industry, which Hatch deregulated in 1994.

=== Electoral history ===
1976 U.S. Senate election in Utah
Party	Candidate	Votes	%
General election
Republican	Orrin Hatch	290,221	53.73
Democratic	Frank Moss (incumbent)	241,948	44.80
American Independent	George M. Batchelor	4,913	0.91
Libertarian	Steve Trotter	3,026	0.56
Total votes		540,108	100.00
Republican gain from Democratic			

1982 U.S. Senate election in Utah
Party	Candidate	Votes	%
Republican	Orrin Hatch (incumbent)	309,332	58.28
Democratic	Ted Wilson	219,482	41.35
Libertarian	George Mercier	1,035	0.19
American	Lawrence R. Kauffman	953	0.19
Total votes		530,802	100.00
Republican hold			

1988 U.S. Senate election in Utah
Party	Candidate	Votes	%
Republican	Orrin Hatch (incumbent)	430,084	67.13
Democratic	Brian Moss	203,364	31.74
American	Robert J. Smith	6,016	0.94
Socialist Workers	William M. Arth	1,233	0.19
Total votes		640,697	100.00
Republican hold			

1994 U.S. Senate election in Utah
Party	Candidate	Votes	%
Republican	Orrin Hatch (incumbent)	357,297	68.80
Democratic	Patrick Shea	146,938	28.30
Independent	Craig Oliver	9,550	1.84
American	Gary Van Horn	2,543	0.49
Socialist Workers	Nelson Gonzalez	1,514	0.29
American Independent	Lawrence Topham	1,462	0.28
Total votes		519,304	100.00
Republican hold			

2000 U.S. Senate election in Utah
Party	Candidate	Votes	%
Republican	Orrin Hatch (incumbent)	504,803	65.58
Democratic	Scott Howell	242,569	31.51
American Independent	Carlton Edward Bowen	11,938	1.55
Libertarian	Jim Dexter	10,394	1.35
Total votes		769,704	100.00
Republican hold			

2006 U.S. Senate election in Utah
Primary election
Party	Candidate	Votes	%
Republican	Orrin Hatch (incumbent)	356,238	62.36
Democratic	Pete Ashdown	177,459	31.06
Constitution	Scott Bradley	21,526	3.77
Personal Choice	Roger Price	9,089	1.59
Libertarian	Dave Seely	4,428	0.78
Green	Julian Hatch	2,512	0.44
Total votes		571,252	100.00
Republican hold			

2012 U.S. Senate election in Utah
Primary election
Party	Candidate	Votes	%
Republican	Orrin Hatch (incumbent)	146,394	66.5
Republican	Dan Liljenquist	73,668	33.5
Total votes		220,062	100.00
General election
Republican	Orrin Hatch (incumbent)	657,608	65.31
Democratic	Scott Howell	301,873	29.98
Constitution	Shaun McCausland	31,905	3.17
Justice	Daniel Geery	8,342	0.83
Independent	Bill Barron	7,172	0.71
Total votes		1,006,901	100.00
Republican hold			

== Personal life ==
Hatch married Elaine Hansen on August 28, 1957. They had six children. In January 2024, his son, Brent, declared his candidacy to replace Mitt Romney as a United States Senator for Utah in the 2024 election.

Hatch was a lifelong member of The Church of Jesus Christ of Latter-day Saints (LDS Church). Although he was born in Pennsylvania, his parents had been raised in Utah and he had ancestors who were members of the LDS Church in Nauvoo, Illinois. Hatch served as a Latter-day Saint missionary in what was called the "Great Lakes States Mission" essentially covering large parts of Indiana, Michigan, and Ohio. Hatch later served in various positions in the church, including as a bishop.

Hatch was a founder and co-chair of the Federalist Society, an organization of conservative lawyers.

Hatch served as a member of the board of directors of the United States Holocaust Memorial Museum. In a 1996 interview on 60 Minutes, Hatch said he wears a mezuzah necklace in order to remind himself that another Holocaust should never be allowed to occur.

Despite their political differences, Hatch was a longtime friend of fellow senator Ted Kennedy, spoke at his memorial service in 2009, and publicly suggested Kennedy's widow, Victoria Reggie, as a replacement for Kennedy in the Senate.

Hatch was a close friend of Muhammad Ali. Ali campaigned for Hatch when he ran for reelection in 1988. Hatch spoke at Ali's funeral in 2016.

=== Death ===
Hatch died in Salt Lake City on April 23, 2022, aged 88, from complications of a stroke he had the week prior. He is buried in Newton.

== Musical career and film appearances ==
Hatch played the piano, violin, and organ. Fueled by his interest in poetry, Hatch composed songs for many artists. One of his songs, "Unspoken", went platinum after appearing on WOW Hits 2005, a compilation of Christian pop music. He co-authored "Everything and More", sung by Billy Gilman. In addition to serving as a United States senator, Hatch earned over $10,000 as an LDS musical recording artist.

Rock musician Frank Zappa composed a guitar instrumental entitled "Orrin Hatch on Skis", which appears on his 1988 album, Guitar.

In March 1997, Hatch and Janice Kapp Perry jointly recorded an album with Tree Music entitled My God Is Love. Hatch's later albums with Perry included "Come to the Manger".

Hatch appeared as himself, alongside Chuck Grassley, in Steven Soderbergh's 2000 Oscar-winning drama Traffic, in a brief cameo in a scene set during a Washington, D.C. cocktail party. Soderbergh later featured one of Hatch's songs, "Souls Along The Way", in his film Ocean's 12 as background music for a scene in Hatch's home state of Utah.

Hatch and Janice Kapp Perry co-wrote the song "Heal Our Land", which was performed at George W. Bush's January 2005 inauguration.

Hatch, along with Lowell Alexander and Phil Naish, composed the 2006 song "Blades of Grass and Pure White Stones".

Hatch's likeness was featured in the 30 Rock episode "Jack Gets in the Game", aired in 2007, as one of Dr. Leo Spaceman's famous clients.

In 2009, at the request of The Atlantic correspondent Jeffrey Goldberg, Hatch wrote the lyrics to "Eight Days of Hanukkah", described by Goldberg as "a hip hop Hannukah song written by the senior senator from Utah."

Hatch appeared in a 2015 scene in the Parks and Recreation episode "Ms. Ludgate-Dwyer Goes to Washington" alongside Cory Booker.

== Writing ==
- Orrin Hatch, The Equal Rights Amendment: Myths and Realities, Savant Press (1983)
- Orrin Hatch, Higher Laws: Understanding the Doctrines of Christ , Shadow Mountain (1995) ISBN 978-0-87579-896-7
- Orrin Hatch, Square Peg: Confessions of a Citizen Senator, Basic Books (2002) ISBN 978-0-465-02867-2
- Orrin Hatch, Orrin Hatch, the L.D.S. Mormon Politician as Songwriter, text of an interview of Orrin Hatch by Phillip K. Bimstein, in Washington, D.C., August 14, 2003, transcribed by Jonathan Murphy, New York City, American Music Center, 2003, without ISBN.

== Honors ==
Hatch had been awarded the following:

- Commander of the Order of the Star of Romania, Romania (June 8, 2017)
- Order of Duke Branimir, Republic of Croatia (October 29, 2018)
- Presidential Medal of Freedom (November 16, 2018)
- Secretary of the Air Force Distinguished Public Service Award (December 11, 2018)

== See also ==
- Drug Price Competition and Patent Term Restoration Act (Hatch-Waxman Act)
- Internet Community Ports Act
- Music Modernization Act (The Orrin G. Hatch–Bob Goodlatte Music Modernization Act)
- Pirate Act

Party political offices
Preceded by Laurence J. Burton	Republican nominee for U.S. Senator from Utah (Class 1); 1976, 1982, 1988, 1994, 2000, 2006, 2012	Succeeded by Mitt Romney
U.S. Senate
Preceded by Frank Moss	United States Senator (Class 1) from Utah; 1977–2019; Served alongside: Jake Garn, Bob Bennett, Mike Lee	Succeeded by Mitt Romney
Preceded by Harrison A. Williams	Chair of the Senate Labor Committee; 1981–1987	Succeeded by Ted Kennedy
Preceded by Ted Kennedy	Ranking Member of the Senate Labor Committee; 1987–1993	Succeeded by Nancy Kassebaum
Preceded by Strom Thurmond	Ranking Member of the Senate Judiciary Committee; 1993–1995	Succeeded by Joe Biden
Preceded by Joe Biden	Chair of the Senate Judiciary Committee; 1995–2001, 2001	Succeeded by Patrick Leahy
Preceded by Patrick Leahy	Ranking Member of the Senate Judiciary Committee; 2001, 2001–2003	Succeeded by Patrick Leahy
Preceded by Patrick Leahy	Chair of the Senate Judiciary Committee; 2003–2005	Succeeded by Arlen Specter
Preceded by Chuck Grassley	Ranking Member of the Senate Finance Committee; 2011–2015	Succeeded by Ron Wyden
Preceded by Ron Wyden	Chair of the Senate Finance Committee; 2015–2019	Succeeded by Chuck Grassley
Preceded by Kevin Brady	Chair of the Joint Taxation Committee; 2016–2017	Succeeded by Kevin Brady
Preceded by Kevin Brady	Chair of the Joint Taxation Committee; 2018–2019	Succeeded by Richard Neal
New office	Chair of the Joint Pensions Committee; 2018–2019	Position abolished
Honorary titles
Preceded by Richard Lugar	Most senior Republican in the United States Senate; 2013–2019	Succeeded by Chuck Grassley
Political offices
Preceded by Patrick Leahy	President pro tempore of the United States Senate; 2015–2019	Succeeded by Chuck Grassley
