= 1994 United States Senate election in Utah =

- November 8, 1994
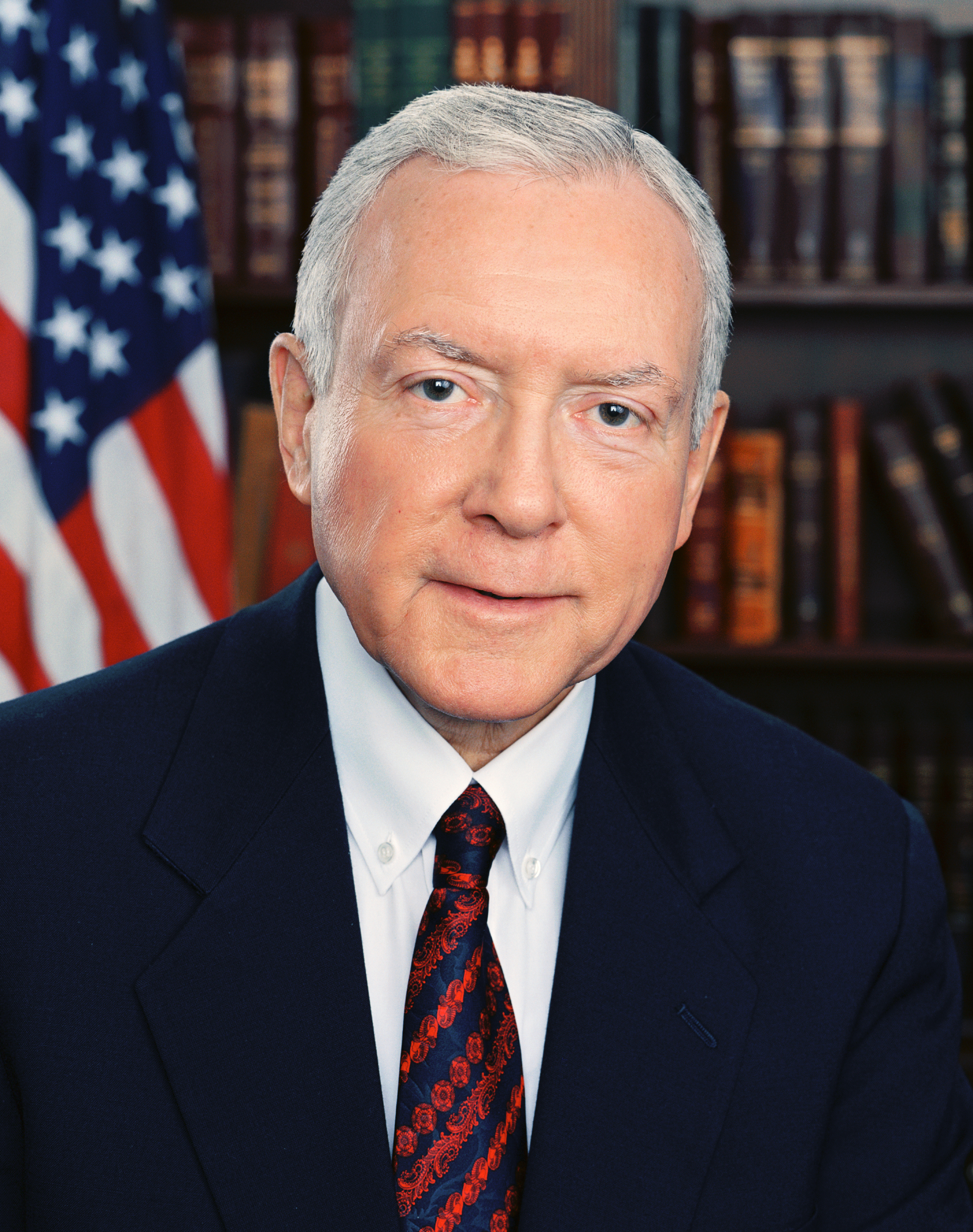

| Nominee | Orrin Hatch | Patrick Shea |
| Party | Republican | Democratic |
| Popular vote | 357,297 | 146,938 |
| Percentage | 68.80% | 28.30% |
- County results Hatch: 50–60% 60–70% 70–80% 80–90% Shea: 50–60%
U.S. senator before election
Orrin Hatch
Republican
Elected U.S. Senator
Orrin Hatch
Republican

The 1994 United States Senate election in Utah was held November 8, 1994. Incumbent Republican U.S. Senator Orrin Hatch won re-election to a fourth term. This was Orrin Hatch's best performance from all of his runs for senate.

== Major candidates ==
=== Democratic ===
- Patrick A. Shea, Utah Democratic Party chair since 1983, Gubernatorial primary candidate in 1992, lawyer

=== Republican ===
- Orrin Hatch, incumbent U.S. Senator

== Results ==
General election results
| Party | Candidate | Votes | % | ±% |
|---|---|---|---|---|
| Republican | Orrin Hatch (Incumbent) | 357,297 | 68.80% | |
| Democratic | Patrick A. Shea | 146,938 | 28.30% | |
| Independent | Craig Oliver | 9,550 | 1.84% | |
| American | Gary Van Horn | 2,543 | 0.49% | |
| Socialist Workers | Nelson Gonzalez | 1,514 | 0.29% | |
| Independent American | Lawrence Topham | 1,462 | 0.48% | |
| Majority | | 210,359 | 40.50% | |
| Turnout | | 519,304 | | |
| Republican hold | | Swing | | |

== See also ==
- 1994 United States Senate elections
