= Reed Cowan =

American journalist

- Born: Darrin Reed Cowan; July 24, 1972 (age 54); Roosevelt, Utah, U.S.
- Other name: Reed Abplanalp-Cowan
- Education: Utah State University
- Occupation: Journalist
- Years active: 1995–present
- Employer(s): Fox Television Stations (1995–1996); Heritage Broadcasting Group (1996–1997); Westwind Communications (1997–1999); Bonneville International and Deseret Management Corporation (1999–2000); Clear Channel Communications (2000–2007); Sunbeam Television (2007–2011); Intermountain West Communications Company (2012–2014); Sinclair Broadcast Group (2014–2022); CBS News and Stations (Paramount Global) (2022-present)
- Television: KSTU (1995–1996); WWTV (1996–1997); KBAK-TV (1997–1999); KSL-TV (1999–2000); KTVX (2000–2007); WSVN (2007–2011); KSNV (2012–2022); KPIX-TV (2022-present)
- Spouse: Stephanie Swain Martinsen (divorced) Gregory Abplanalp (m. 2013)
- Children: 1 (with Martinsen, deceased); 3 (with Abplanalp, adopted)
- Website: Official website

Darrin Reed Cowan (also known as Reed Abplanalp-Cowan) (born July 24, 1972) is an American journalist. He currently serves as an anchor for CBS News 24/7 as well as the co-anchor of the CBS News Bay Area Morning Edition.

Cowan co-directed the GLAAD Media Award winning 2010 documentary 8: The Mormon Proposition with Steven Greenstreet.

== Career ==
Cowan started his journalism career working as a radio disc-jockey for KNEU Radio in Roosevelt, Utah. In 1995, Cowan worked as a part-time on-air reporter for Fox's KSTU in Salt Lake City, Utah while a student at Utah State University. From there he assumed full-time positions as an anchor for KBAK-TV in Bakersfield, California, and as an anchor for WWTV in Cadillac, Michigan. Cowan next worked as a reporter and weekend morning anchor for KSL-TV in Salt Lake City.

After KSL-TV, Cowan moved to KTVX, also in Salt Lake City. While there, he anchored Good Morning Utah and covered the terrorist attacks of 9-11, the kidnapping of Elizabeth Smart, the murder of Lori Hacking, the death of former President Ronald Reagan and the fugitive stories of polygamist sect leader Warren Jeffs.

Along with Jordan Whitney, Cowan won a local Rocky Mountain Emmy Award in 2008 for editing a piece called Emo Culture. Cowan was nominated alongside coworkers Robbin Simmons, Dianna Reed and Chris Volz for the 2008 and 2009 Suncoast Regional Emmy Awards but they failed to win any prizes.

In 2022, Cowan joined CBS News Bay Area as a reporter and anchor.

In June 2024, Cowan was named as an anchor of CBS News 24/7. He continues to serve at CBS News Bay Area.

== Personal life ==
Cowan was born on July 24, 1972, in Roosevelt, Utah, and was raised in the Mormon religion. During his teenage years Cowan had a relationship with Gregory Abplanalp, who attended the same high school as Cowan. Cowan ended the relationship at the request of a church leader and went through years of various forms of conversion therapy, then married a woman at the urging of another church leader. During this marriage Cowan had his first child, Wesley, who died in 2006 after falling from a horizontal set of monkey bars. The marriage ended after three years and Cowan re-united with Abplanalp, whom he married on September 4, 2013, in Laguna Beach and with whom adopted three children. The couple sustained dozens of Utah’s gay couples receiving marriage licenses at the Washington County Clerk’s office on December 23, 2013.

Wesley's death prompted Cowan to found the Wesley Smiles Coalition, which works with Free the Children to raise funds to build schools in Africa. Cowan also made the 2007 documentary The Other Side of the Lens, which covers his emotions over his son's death and his experiences with the media attention Wesley's death attracted.

Cowan is also on the advisory board for Free The Children, a child advocacy organization, and serves as a producer for the youth organization Power In You. He is also an active supporter of anti-bullying legislation and has worked as a public speaker on the subject of bullying in school.

== Film reviews ==
Cowan has produced and directed two self-made films, The Other Side of the Lens and 8. The Mormon Proposition. These were met with mixed reviews from film critics, with some praising his highly personal choices of subject matter while others criticized what they viewed as self-absorption, disjointed storytelling and substandard production as well as the overuse of stock footage.

=== The Other Side of the Lens (2009) ===
Cowan's first film, The Other Side of the Lens, explored Cowan's feelings as he mourned the death of his 4 year-old son Wesley in a playground accident. The film follows Cowan to an impoverished rural region of Kenya, where he sought to expiate his grief by raising money to build a schoolhouse.

On April 3, 2006, Cowan, then working as a television news reporter, Cowan was called to cover a story about a child who had been accidentally hanged from a set of monkey bars. Upon arrival he learned that the child was his own 4-year old son Wesley. The first half of the film expresses Cowan's anger towards the local news media, both for indifference towards his situation and for what he alleged to be inaccurate reporting. One report claimed that Wesley had hung himself on a swingset, suggesting a deliberate suicide, which Cowan denied. The film becomes a "therapeutic journal" in which Cowan processes his grief while critically examining his own role in sensationalizing the news in search of ratings and the furtherance of his professional ambitions.

The second half of the film follows Cowan seeking to fill the void left in Wesley's wake by raising money to build a schoolhouse for an impoverished rural community in Kenya. It depicts Cowan as a humanitarian whose trauma caused him to evolve as a person, highlighting his efforts to save children from violence which followed Kenya's December 2007 election.

Film critic Richard Propes and founding member of the Indiana Film Journalists Association, who was on the jury for the 2009 Indianapolis International Film Festival where the film screened, rated the film C− and gave it 1.5 out of 5 stars, calling it "a self-indulgent, pretentious film that only begins to become effective toward the end of the 102-minute film." While much of the film was devoted to criticizing sensationalism in the news media, Propes writes, ""The Other Side of the Lens" reinforces the sensationalism by showing examples of said sensationalism," using as an example footage of a driver intentionally crashing into a crowd with children, at one point in slow-motion. which is repeated throughout the film. The film's final pivot to saving children from election violence he calls "a loosely connected dramatic story arch with no true purpose beyond, perhaps, illustrating Cowan's evolution of a man" which "feels like yet another manipulation in a film that has too often felt unsatisfyingly and unnecessarily sensationalized.". Propes concludes,"Unfortunately, despite Cowan's seemingly sincere efforts, the news reporter never moves out of the way enough for the true story of "The Other Side of the Lens" to come to life."

In a review for the 2009 Nashville Film Festival, Nashville Scene film editor Jim Ridley concludes, "The director's noble intentions and good deeds cannot be faulted, but his insistence on telling the entire story first-person, often on camera, sometimes edges queasily close to narcissism—especially when he leads a guided tour of a compound filled with children's corpses." Ridley also highlights Cowan's use of stock footage of Saddam Hussein's execution by hanging. Joe Shearer on FilmYap rated the film more positively, giving it 3.5 stars out of 5.

=== 8. The Mormon Proposition (2010) ===
Cowan's second film, 8. The Mormon Proposition, began in 2008 as an exploration of suicide among homeless gay teenagers in Salt Lake City, but wound up focusing on the support of the Church of Jesus Christ of Latter-day Saints (LDS Church) for California's Proposition 8, a successful popular referendum banning same-sex marriage which Cowan called "one of the largest ballot-measure shams in the history of the United States". The film was co-produced with Steven Greenstreet and WordPerfect co-founder and gay rights activist Bruce Bastian. It was narrated by Dustin Lance Black, a gay Mormon who had won an academy award for writing the screenplay of Milk about politician and gay rights activist Harvey Milk. Cowan funded the film by taking out a second mortgage on his home and running up tens of thousands of dollars of credit card debt, with Bastian providing the remainder.

Cowan claimed that, while making the film, he was approached by a gay man he called "Mormon Deep Throat" who had worked for the Church of Jesus Christ of Latter-day Saints and leaked documents which outlined the Church's strategy for defeating same-sex marriage at the polls. The film accused the Church of breaching the barrier separating church and state and of evading scrutiny by encouraging its members to donate to the Proposition 8 campaign as individuals. One of its tactics, it claimed, was allying with other Christian denominations such as the Catholic Church.

Interviewed in October 2009 by Salt Lake City Weekly's Jesse Fruhwirth, a freelance journalist who also wrote for Bitch Media, Cowan compared the plight of gay Mormons with that of Blacks and predicted that one day the Church would allow gay sex. Cowan blamed Mormons for spreading what he called "misinformation" about the California ballot measure and drew an analogy to the predicament of homeless gay Mormon teenagers. Of his battle with the Church, Cowan remarked, "Let's call it what it is: it's a holy war."

Months before the trailer's release, Cowan interviewed Utah Senator Chris Buttars to discuss homophobia and what Buttars called "pig sex", then leaked the interview to the press.

On January 25, 2010, the film screened at the Sundance Film Festival in Park City, Utah, but failed to win any nominations or awards. Asked at Sundance why he created the film, Cowan answered, "Really, my personal reason…is the fact that I was a kid in Roosevelt, Utah, who knew what it was like to be called a ‘faggot’ every day."

The film was attacked on social media by Mormon commenters. Cowan received negative mail, with some blaming his son's death on his homosexual lifestyle. In response to inquiries about the film, Church spokesman Michael Purdy said, "We have not seen ‘8: The Mormon Proposition.’ However, judging from the trailer and background material online, it appears that accuracy and truth are rare commodities in this film. Clearly, anyone looking for balance and thoughtful discussion of a serious topic will need to look elsewhere."

Reviewers were generally supportive of the film's intended message, but not as positive about the film itself. Daniel Fienberg, former president of the Television Critics Association and currently chief film critic for The Hollywood Reporter, called the film "sloppily assembled propaganda". A writer for the Salt Lake City Tribune, on the other hand, called it "a vital, important cry for an open dialogue."

Variety's chief film critic Peter Debruge staked out a middle ground, saying the film "covers a lot of ground in a short space, not always in the most organized way, but on enough fronts to spark an informed dialogue." Debruge objected that LDS Church elders' voices had been distorted and their faces shown in unflattering closeups as they discussed homosexuality and religious freedom. When questioned about the seemingly distorted audio, Cowan denied that it had been distorted while co-director Greenstreet said that the audio had been taken from low quality MP3 files. Debruge summarized, "Mostly preaching to the converted, Reed Cowan’s docu[mentary] serves as agitprop against Prop. 8".

IndieWire's Peter Knegt, who writes and makes films on gay-themed topics, reviewed the film following its screening at Sundance. While sympathetic to its overall direction, Knegt criticized what he called "downright bizarre choices in sound and stock footage to laughable recreated sequences" and deemed its use of music overly aggressive and manipulative of the audience.

Tim Plant of Metro Weekly, a Washington, D.C.–based magazine oriented towards LGBTQ+ readers, concluded, "While Cowan ably creates an effective narrative, the technical aspects of the documentary don’t live up to the same standards. Rudimentary editing, unnecessary graphics during transitions, and overuse of the same stock footage (there are only so many times we can watch money being counted), reduces the production to a lower quality than the story."

Cowan said that he no longer speaks to his father and sisters, who remain devout Mormons, and that his parents refused to see the film. He remarked, "I hate that the content of this film will likely cause a period of pain for people I love."

== Alleged extortion ==
In April 2021, Cowan demanded $20 million from Toronto-based WE Charity for the "destruction of his character and marketability as a journalist, public speaker, filmmaker and author," stating that if they did not pay he would use his position as an anchorman with Sinclair Broadcast Group to destroy their reputation. The dispute arose from the placement of a plaque honoring Cowan's deceased son Wesley at a school in Kenya built by WE Charity, about which Cowan had testified before the Canadian Parliament several weeks prior. WE Charity's attorneys responded by accusing Cowan of attempted extortion. Journalism professor and media ethics specialist Mary Hausch of the University of Nevada, Las Vegas commented that Cowan's threats breached established standards requiring journalists to avoid conflicts of interest.

== Filmography ==
- The Other Side of the Lens (2009, as producer, director)
- 8: The Mormon Proposition (2010, as producer, director)

== Awards and nominations ==
- 2007, nominated Rocky Mountain Regional Emmy Award for KTVX
- 2008, won Rocky Mountain Regional Emmy Award for KTVX
- 2008, nominated Suncoast Regional Emmy Award for WSVN
- 2009, nominated Suncoast Regional Emmy Award for WSVN
- 2011, won GLAAD Media Award for Outstanding Documentary for 8: The Mormon Proposition
- 2013, won 5 Pacific Southwest Regional Emmy Awards for KSNV-DT (now KSNV)
- 2014, won 4 Pacific Southwest Regional Emmy Awards for KSNV-DT (now KSNV)
- 2015, nominated 3 Pacific Southwest Regional Emmy Awards for KSNV-DT (now KSNV)
- 2016, won Pacific Southwest Regional Emmy Award for KSNV
