= Utah Families Foundation =

Foundation that helps needy families in Utah

The foundation which "seeks to help needy Utah families who face homelessness, poverty, hunger, unemployment, illness or illiteracy" was established by Utah Senator Orrin Hatch and sponsored by numerous health care related companies and organizations. The current president of the foundation is Carol Nixon, wife of former federal immigration judge William L. Nixon. She is notable as the first woman to serve as chief of staff to a Utah governor. Criticism has arisen concerning donations from drug companies. The criticism being "... Critics say they doubt those firms did that out of concern for Utah families, but instead gave the big money to reward their longtime political ally Sen. Orrin Hatch — who helped create the group and helps raise funds for it..."

The foundation will be celebrating its 26th year in August 2016 with a golf outing at Montage Deer Valley, Park City, Utah.
