= Carol Nixon =

President of Utah Families Foundation

Carol Nixon is President of Utah Families Foundation, Utah Arts Council director and the first female to serve as chief of staff to a Utah governor.
