= 1988 United States Senate election in Utah =

- November 8, 1988
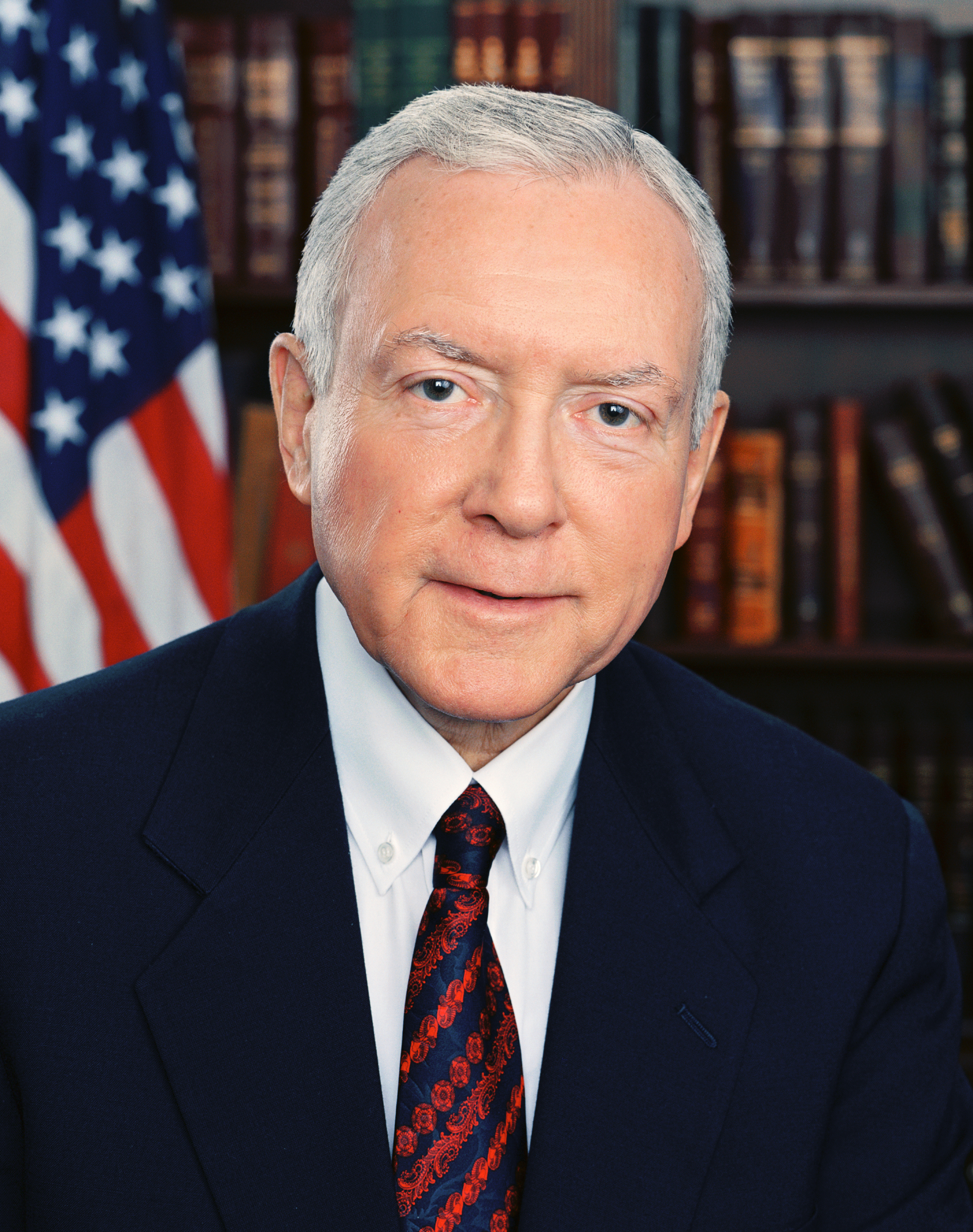

Nominee	Orrin Hatch	Brian Moss
Party	Republican	Democratic
Popular vote	430,084	203,364
Percentage	67.13%	31.74%
- County results Hatch: 50–60% 60–70% 70–80% 80–90% Moss: 60–70%
U.S. senator before election
Orrin Hatch
Republican
Elected U.S. Senator
Orrin Hatch
Republican

The 1988 United States Senate election in Utah took place on November 8, 1988, concurrently with the U.S. presidential election, other elections to United States Senate and United States House of Representatives, and various state and local elections. Republican Orrin Hatch won re-election against Democratic challenger Brian Moss, the son of Hatch's predecessor, Frank Moss.

== General election ==
=== Candidates ===
- William M. Arth (Socialist Workers)
- Orrin Hatch, incumbent senator (Republican)
- Brian Moss, son of former U.S. senator Frank Moss (Democratic)
- Robert J. Smith (American)

=== Results ===
1988 United States Senate election in Utah
Party	Candidate	Votes	%
Republican	Orrin Hatch (incumbent)	430,084	67.13%
Democratic	Brian H. Moss	203,364	31.74%
American	Robert J. Smith	6,016	0.94%
Socialist Workers	William M. Arth	1,233	0.19%
Majority		227,720	35.39%
Total votes		640,697	100.00%
Republican hold			

== See also ==
- 1988 United States Senate elections
