= Patrick Shea (Utah lawyer) =

American lawyer

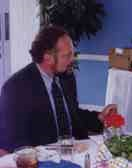

Director of the Bureau of Land Management
- In office 1997–1998
- President: Bill Clinton
- Preceded by: Mike Dombeck
- Succeeded by: Tom Fry

Chair of the Utah Democratic Party
- In office c. 1983–1992

Personal details
- Born: Patrick A. Shea; February 28, 1948 (age 78) Salt Lake City, Utah, U.S.
- Party: Democratic
- Spouse: Debbie Kern (1980–present)
- Children: 2
- Education: Stanford University (BA); University of Oxford (MA); Harvard University (JD)

Patrick A. Shea (born February 28, 1948) is an American lawyer, author, politician, government official, and legal scholar known for his work on freedom of the press cases. He also served as director of the Bureau of Land Management in 1997 and 1998.

== Early life and education ==
Shea was born at the Salt Lake Regional Medical Center in Salt Lake City. He lived with his parents in Montana for six years before returning to Utah. He graduated from Highland High School in 1966.

Shea earned a Bachelor of Arts degree from Stanford University. He then was a Rhodes Scholar at Oxford University, where he studied human sciences and was part of the first graduating cohort of the degree. He earned a Juris Doctor from Harvard Law School in 1975.

== Career ==
=== Government ===
Shea served as the assistant to the staff director of the Church Committee in 1975 and 1976. Shea was counsel to the United States Senate Foreign Relations Committee during the drafting process of the Taiwan Relations Act.

Shea served as a commissioner on the Gore Commission on Aviation Safety and Security, which investigated the TWA Flight 800, in 1996 and 1997.

Prior to becoming head of the BLM, Shea was the head of City Creek Canyon Park in Salt Lake City.

In 1997 and 2000, Shea served as the Director of the Bureau of Land Management. He served as the director of the Bureau of Land Management and Deputy Assistant Secretary for Land and Minerals Management under President Clinton.

=== Academics ===
He has taught courses at Brigham Young University, the University of Utah, Kansas State University, and Westminster College (Utah) Stanford University Harvard University. Since his return to Utah in 2001, Shea has been a member of the University of Utah political science department's faculty. Shea was an adjunct faculty member of the Department of Agronomy at Kansas State University from 2001 to 2009. Shea was a fellowship adviser to honors program at Westminster College, Salt Lake City in collaboration with 'The Living Arts Experience: A Seminar in Liberal Ideals'. Shea taught a course on Public Lands 2019/20 and co-taught a graduate seminar on wild land fires. While at Law School taught two courses on the Political Processes and the Constitution.

Shea became chair of Utah Democratic Party in 1983 and chaired state presidential campaigns of Walter Mondale, Michael Dukakis, and Bill Clinton. He was a candidate for governor of Utah in 1992, placing second in the Democratic primary. He was the Democratic nominee in the 1994 United States Senate election in Utah.

Shea co-authored with Rodney K. Smith Religion and the Press: Keeping First Amendment Values in Balance, a book which argued that Freedom of the Press had been taken too far in allowing the media to publish unsubstantiated claims that demean religious leaders.

=== Law ===
Shea represented Massachusetts Democratic Party in seeking to gain enough information to exclude Mitt Romney from running for governor in Massachusetts. He represented Skip Knowles after he was fired by The Salt Lake Tribune for plagiarism. He represented Steven Greenstreet's defense against Kay Anderson's attempts to prevent Greenstreet's use of an interview with Anderson in a documentary film This Divided State. Shea also was one of the lawyers for Brent W. Jeffs in his sexual molestation suit against his uncle Warren Jeffs. He is admitted to the bar in the District of Columbia and Utah.

== Personal life ==
Shea is an Irish Catholic.

== Sources ==
- Deseret News, February 13, 2001
- Shea biography
- Institute for Journalism and Natural Resources trustees page
- webpage for Patrick A. Shea
- Attorney Profile

Party political offices
Preceded by Brian Moss	Democratic nominee for United States Senator from Utah (Class 1); 1994	Succeeded by Scott Howell
