= Scott Howell (politician) =

American politician

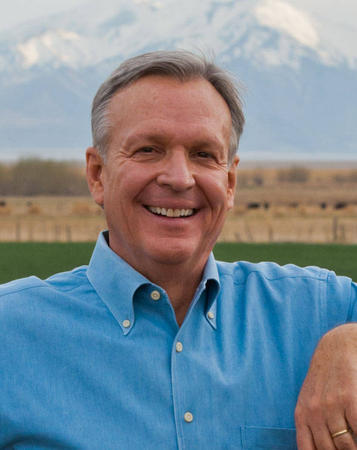

Member of the Utah Senate from the 8th district
- In office January 3, 1989 – January 3, 2000
- Preceded by: Richard Tempest
- Succeeded by: Carlene Walker

Personal details
- Born: September 23, 1953 (age 72) Provo, Utah, U.S.
- Party: Democratic
- Spouse: Linda
- Children: 4
- Education: University of Utah (BA)

Scott N. Howell (born September 28, 1953) is an American politician from Utah. He was the Democratic nominee for the United States Senate from Utah in the 2000 and 2012 elections.

== Early life and education ==
Howell was born in Provo, Utah. He grew up in Salt Lake City. He attended Dixie State College in Southern Utah on a football scholarship and graduated from the University of Utah with a Bachelor of Arts degree in political science.

== Career ==
After graduation, Howell went to work with IBM, where he advanced through the years until he became the director of Global System Integrators/Channel Strategies and the executive of IBM Public Sector operations. In these roles, he helped governments worldwide increase effectiveness and efficiency through information technology.

In 2003, Scott completed a year of Harvard Executive Education to become an "IBM Certified Professional." In 2006, Howell completed the IBM certification and became a "Master Deal Maker," which was taught at the Wharton School of Business at the University of Pennsylvania.

Internationally, Howell was a "Smart Communities" advocate. In this role, he consulted with the governments of Australia, Japan, Italy, and Latvia.

He and his wife, Linda, are the parents of four sons.

=== Utah Senate ===
Howell served in the Utah State Senate for three terms, including eight years as the Senate Democratic Leader. Under his guidance, Utah became one of the first states to utilize on-line government services, such as vehicle registration. In addition, he drew on his experience in business to make improvements in health care, transportation, public safety, and tax reform. Legislative committee assignments included Health and Human Services, Education, Government Innovation, Transportation, and Olympic Sports Authority. Howell was a ranking member of the "Executive Appropriations Committee," in charge of fiscal appropriations of Utah's $1.3 billion annual budget.

=== 2012 U.S. Senate election ===
At the Utah Democratic Convention on April 21, 2012, Howell defeated Pete Ashdown to secure the Utah Democratic Party's nomination for the U.S. Senate race against the incumbent senator, Orrin Hatch, Utah's six-term senator seeking his seventh. Howell did this after securing 63% of the vote at the convention in Salt Palace Convention Center. During his pre-convention campaign, Howell emphasized his electability, highlighting his position as a conservative Democrat who possessed the same socially conservative values as Utah voters.

Howell's 2012 campaign ran on three platforms: energy, education and the economy. In August 2012, Howell accused Hatch of "Ducking Debates," because Hatch failed to show up for debates against him and other candidates running in the 2012 U.S. Senate Race. Howell was quoted in the article as saying, "I believe he thinks the best way to keep his job is to not let people see they have a choice. I think he [Hatch] knows people will see that I'm the candidate that represents Utah the best." A few days later, the Salt Lake Tribune published an article calling for Hatch to be debating his opponents, "Utah voters deserve to see and hear the candidates air their differences up close." The article also referenced Hatch in his 1976 campaign by saying, "Hatch should agree to several debates well before voters have to make up their minds. Hatch thought that would be fair when he was trying to unseat an incumbent 36 years ago. He was right then, and fair is still fair," referencing when Hatch challenged the then incumbent senator, Frank Moss.

== Community involvement ==
Howell at the 2012 Senate debate

National memberships include the Harvard Policy Group at Harvard's Kennedy School of Government, the United States Internet Council (board member), and the Democratic Leadership Council (which advocates free market solutions to government problems). Scott also served as an officer in the State Legislative Leaders Foundation and was nominated to and attended the Darden School of Business (University of Virginia) education program for leaders and "rising stars." While in Utah, Scott served on the "2002 Salt Lake City Olympic Organizing Committee". In 1992, he was appointed as a board member to the "Intermountain Health Care" organization and served until 2002.

In 2007, Howell was appointed as a Trustee to the Board for Sutter Health. Howell worked with the Pioneer Park Coalition of Salt Lake City to create a stable, productive environment in the Pioneer Park area.

Party political offices
Preceded by Patrick Shea	Democratic nominee for U.S. Senator from Utah (Class 1); 2000	Succeeded by Pete Ashdown
Preceded by Pete Ashdown	Democratic nominee for U.S. Senator from Utah (Class 1); 2012	Succeeded by Jenny Wilson
