= This Divided State =

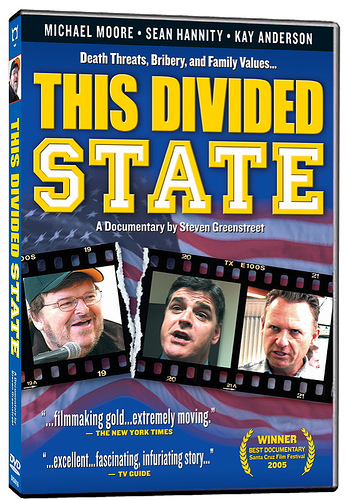
- DVD cover
- Directed by: Steven Greenstreet
- Produced by: Phil Gordon; Steven Greenstreet; Kristi Haycock
- Starring: Michael Moore; Sean Hannity; Kay Anderson
- Cinematography: Matt Eastin; Wes Eldredge; Steven Greenstreet; Joshua Ligairi
- Edited by: Steven Greenstreet
- Distributed by: Disinformation
- Release date: July 22, 2005
- Running time: 88 minutes
- Language: English
- Budget: $10,000

This Divided State is a documentary film by first-time filmmaker Steven Greenstreet. It details the conflict that erupted at Utah Valley State College, now called Utah Valley University, when controversial liberal figure and documentarian Michael Moore was scheduled to come speak on campus shortly before the 2004 presidential election. The documentary explores rising political partisanship in the United States as Greenstreet examines the uproar from the students and community members and the subsequent debate surrounding the First Amendment.

== Synopsis ==
In September 2004, UVSC student council leaders, Jim Bassi and Joseph Vogel, invited liberal filmmaker Michael Moore to come speak on campus at Utah Valley State College. The predominantly conservative community of Orem surrounding the school erupted in an uproar, believing that the university's funds should not be spent on his visit. A pandemonium of protests, petitions, and demonstrations escalated into hate mail, threatening phone calls, threatened lawsuits, and countless incendiary editorials.

Attempting to offset the controversy, UVSC invited conservative commentator Sean Hannity, scheduling his appearance a few days prior to Moore’s visit. Hannity waived his normal $100,000 speakers fee, but still demanded that UVSC cover his travel costs, which totaled $49,850. The total "generally surprised" UVSC officials when they received the bill. Also featured in the film is prominent voice of the opposition, Kay Anderson, a local real estate mogul who offered UVSC $25,000 to cancel Moore’s appearance, and, when that failed, tried to sue the school for misuse of funds.

== Production ==
Steven Greenstreet, a Utah Valley State Valley student at the time, embarked on the concept along with his friends, Bryan Young and Elias and Michelle Pate, describing the ensuing commotion as “a huge crush of political debate and an overwhelming sense of activity and electricity.”

The filmmakers captured at least 70 hours of material in the course of three months. Greenstreet eventually maxed out three credit cards, emptied his bank account, and dropped out of Brigham Young University, devoting himself exclusively to this project. In one instance, when the filmmakers could no longer afford the cost of home internet access, they resorted to piggybacking on an unsuspecting neighbor's wireless signal, only accessible at the foot of a family member’s bed.

Often spending twenty hours a day editing, Greenstreet trimmed the footage down to eighty-eight minutes. Juxtaposing candidly emotional interviews against unruly public spectacles, he strove for neutrality, advancing the story without narration and allowing equal time to all opposing opinions. The filmmakers could not forget the importance of finishing the film soon, while the events involved were still relevant and fresh in the public’s minds.

Upon learning UVSC professor and self-proclaimed liberal, Phil Gordon, had become involved in the project, Kay Anderson filed a claim against Greenstreet, attempting to revoke his previously signed consent to be included in the film citing issues with misrepresentation and bias. With the aiding representation of attorney Patrick Shea, Anderson’s attempts to remove himself, and more particularly a private interview with Greenstreet in his home, from the film proved unsuccessful. Greenstreet defended using Anderson in the film, “without the personal interview that I did with him, he doesn't get a chance to explain his motivation.”

== Release ==
On February 5, 2005, the eighty-eight-minute final product premiered at UVSC's Ragan Theater, receiving a standing ovation from the 700 people overflowing the Theater's 400-seat capacity. On the heels of the sold-out premiere, the filmmakers commenced a publicity blitz to any magazine, newspaper, or film studio that would take their call. Without previous experience, the filmmakers had to quickly learn how to produce their own press kits and market their movie with a team of only four people and minimal resources. Their first big break occurred when Campus Progress, a division of the Center for American Progress, sponsored a tour of the film as part of its "Reel Progress" series. The film went on to screen at twenty-three college campuses, including Yale, Cornell, Vanderbilt, and the University of Southern California.

With Greenstreet on the road for months at a time, his colleagues continued to promote their film in any way possible, arranging a self-distributed theatrical release. Not having money to transfer the film to 35mm screening prints, they simply projected the film digitally from a DVD-R disc. The film went on to play theatrically in more than twenty major U.S. cities, before being released in North America on DVD on September 27, 2005, by The Disinformation Company.

== Reception ==
On the review aggregator website Rotten Tomatoes, 83% of 24 critics' reviews are positive, with an average rating of 6.8/10.

The New York Times called it "filmmaking gold" and "extremely moving." Variety found the film “as boisterous as it is sobering,” while Deseret News claimed it is “surprisingly cohesive and coherent and it does its best to tell all sides of the story.” Orlando Sentinel further posits, “This Divided State shows the power of the newer, cheaper video documentary in all its glory.” In 2005 tied in an audience-based award for Best Documentary at the Santa Cruz Film Festival.

=== Reviews ===
- The Village Voice
- Christian Science Monitor
- eFilm Critic
- The A.V. Club
- TV Guide
