= Health Equity and Access Reform Today Act of 1993 =

Proposed health care reform bill in the United States

The Health Equity and Access Reform Today Act of 1993 (S. 1770, abbreviated HEART) was a health care reform bill introduced into the United States Senate on November 22, 1993, by John Chafee, a Republican senator from Rhode Island, and Chair of the Republican Health Task Force. It was co-sponsored by eighteen other Republican senators, including then-Senate Minority Leader Bob Dole, and two Democratic Senators, Bob Kerrey of Nebraska and David Boren of Oklahoma. It was read twice in the Senate, but was neither debated nor voted upon.

Many of the ideas in the bill were originally proposed by Stuart Butler in 1989, when he worked at The Heritage Foundation, however, some conservatives believed that it was too liberal. It was introduced as an alternative to legislation unveiled earlier that year by then-President Bill Clinton. As a bipartisan bill, it was one of a few comprehensive health care reform bills not to be introduced along party lines as of 2024.

== Comparison with Affordable Care Act ==
It shared many important features with the Affordable Care Act, which was signed into law by President Barack Obama in 2010 on March 23, 2010, including the individual mandate, which was upheld by the Supreme Court in NFIB v. Sebelius as a reasonable exercise of congressional taxing authority. However, there were some differences between HEART and the ACA, including that HEART did not require employers to contribute to the cost of their employees' premiums, and did not require states to expand Medicaid, a provision of the ACA that was ruled unconstitutional by the Supreme Court in NFIB v. Sebelius. Also, HEART, unlike the ACA, included medical malpractice tort reform.
