= 2000 United States Senate election in Utah =

- November 7, 2000
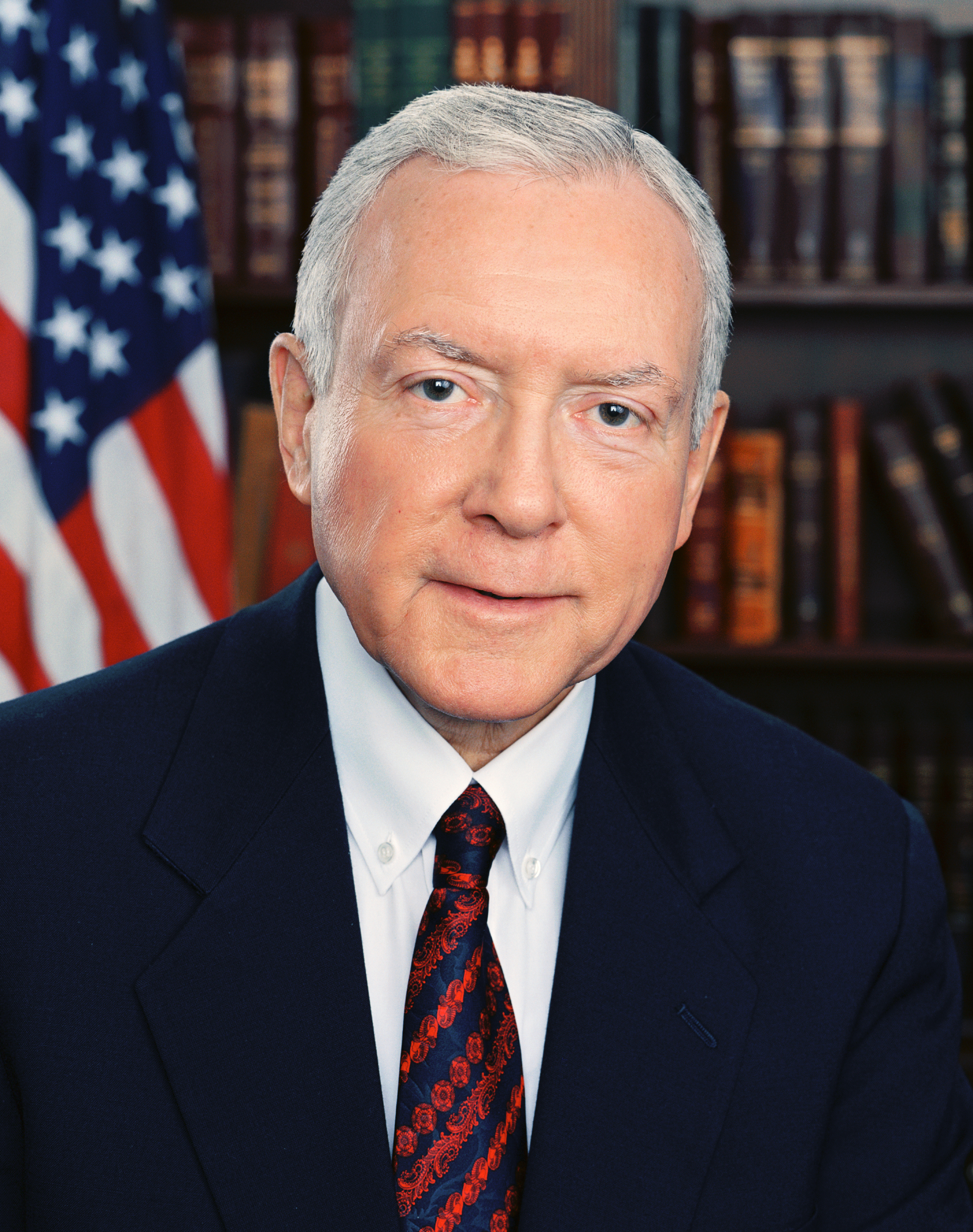

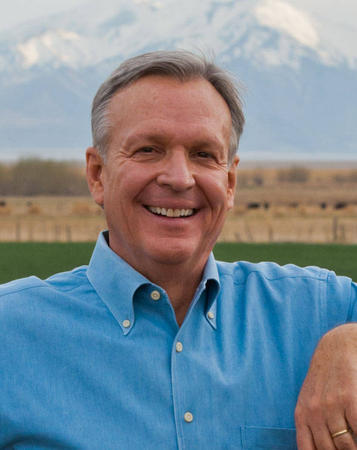
Nominee	Orrin Hatch	Scott Howell
Party	Republican	Democratic
Popular vote	504,803	242,569
Percentage	65.58%	31.51%
- County results Hatch: 40–50% 50–60% 60–70% 70–80% 80–90%
U.S. senator before election
Orrin Hatch
Republican
Elected U.S. Senator
Orrin Hatch
Republican

The 2000 United States Senate election in Utah took place on November 7, 2000. Incumbent Republican U.S. Senator Orrin Hatch won re-election to a fifth term.

== Major candidates ==
=== Democratic ===
- Scott N. Howell, State Senator

=== Republican ===
- Orrin Hatch, incumbent U.S. Senator

== General Election ==
=== Debates ===
- Complete video of debate, October 20, 2000

=== Results ===
General election results
Party	Candidate	Votes	%	±%
Republican	Orrin Hatch (Incumbent)	504,803	65.58%	−3.22%
Democratic	Scott N. Howell	242,569	31.51%	+3.22%
Independent American	Carlton Edward Bowen	11,938	1.55%	+1.27%
Libertarian	Jim Dexter	10,394	1.35%	
Majority		262,234	34.07%	−6.44%
Turnout		769,704		
Republican hold		Swing		

==== Counties that flipped from Democratic to Republican ====
- Carbon (largest city: Price)

== See also ==
- 2000 United States Senate elections
