= Steven Greenstreet =

American documentary filmmaker (born 1979)

- Born: March 14, 1979 (age 47)
- Occupation: Documentary filmmaker
- Years active: 2005–present
- Notable work: This Divided State; 8: The Mormon Proposition
- Awards: 2016 Streamy Award (Best Documentary)

Steven Greenstreet (born March 14, 1979) is an American documentary filmmaker and journalist, known for several documentaries about the campaigns to legalize same-sex marriage in the 2000s, particularly This Divided State (2005) and 8: The Mormon Proposition (2010), which was selected to premiere at the 2010 Sundance Film Festival. He has also worked as a video investigative journalist for The Huffington Post Investigative Fund and a video producer for the US State Department. Since 2014 he has been a video producer at the New York Post.

== Biography ==
Greenstreet grew up in a Mormon family in Pylesville, Maryland. After high school, he spent time as a Mormon missionary.

== Career ==
Greenstreet cites several documentaries he saw as a young adult, including The Thin Blue Line, Roger and Me and Paradise Lost: The Child Murders at Robin Hood Hills, as inspiring his dream to become a documentary filmmaker. Wishing to attend Brigham Young University to study filmmaking but unable to do so because of poor grades, he attended Utah Valley State College for two semesters before transferring to Brigham Young. However, he dropped out after one semester there to produce This Divided State (2005), a documentary about the tense political climate at Utah Valley State College and the surrounding conservative town of Orem. Shortly before the 2004 presidential election, the student council had invited left-wing filmmaker Michael Moore and conservative television host Sean Hannity to speak, leading to widespread protests. The film was well-received, with reviewers praising its objectivity and intimate documentation of political polarization. Greenstreet called the experience a "crash course" in "the whole spectrum of making a movie". He did not return to university after making the film.

In 2008, Greenstreet was hired to edit a documentary about the obesity epidemic in the U.S. called Killer at Large. He ended up directing the film entirely following an executive producer's dissatisfaction with the old director. Upon finishing the film, he accepted a position as a video journalist at the Center for Public Integrity (today the Center for Public Integrity), where he produced short-form investigative pieces. After making a 7-minute piece about the involvement of the Church of Jesus Christ of Latter-day Saints in California's 2008 referendum to ban same-sex marriage, he was approached by Reed Cowan, who suggested making it into a feature-length documentary. Cowan and Greenstreet co-produced the project, which became 8: The Mormon Proposition. The film premiered at the 2010 Sundance Film Festival.

In 2011, Greenstreet created a video called "Hot Chicks of Occupy Wall Street," consisting of brief clips of female protesters. He also created a Tumblr page with the same name, where he began posting pictures of women. Many participants fiercely criticized him for objectifying women, sexualizing them without their consent, and reducing their political activism to a "beauty contest." He defended himself, saying his intention had been to elevate female members of the movement and that he considered "spirit of the video, and the voices within" to be "honorable and inspiring."

Between 2011 and 2013, Greenstreet directed Kesha: My Crazy Beautiful Life, a two-season MTV miniseries about Kesha's concert tours.

In 2016, as part of his role as video producer for the New York Post, he co-produced the video series The Banker Suicides, which won that year's Best Documentary prize at that year's Streamy Awards. In 2019, he began producing and hosting The Basement Office, a YouTube series investigating UFO sightings.

== Filmography ==
- The Basement Office (2019–) (director/producer/host)
- The Curse of Don's Plum (2019) (producer)
- The Banker Suicides (2016) (producer)
- Kesha: My Crazy Beautiful Life (2013) (co-director/producer)
- 8: The Mormon Proposition (2010) (co-director/producer)
- Killer at Large (2008) (director/producer)
- This Divided State (2005) (director/producer)
