= List of United States representatives from Utah =

The following is an alphabetical list of United States representatives from the state of Utah. For chronological tables of members of both houses of the United States Congress from the state (through the present day), see Utah's congressional delegations. The list of names should be complete (as of January 3, 2025), but other data may be incomplete. It includes members who have represented both the state and the territory, both past and present.

== Current members ==
Updated January 3, 2025.

- 1st district: Blake Moore (R) (since 2021)
- 2nd district: Celeste Maloy (R) (since 2023)
- 3rd district: Mike Kennedy (R) (since 2025)
- 4th district: Burgess Owens (R) (since 2021)

== List of representatives ==
Representative	Years	Party	District	Notes
Clarence Emir Allen	January 4, 1896 – March 3, 1897	Republican	At-large	Elected in 1895 and took seat upon statehood. Retired.
John M. Bernhisel	March 4, 1851 – March 3, 1859	Independent	Territory	Elected in 1850. Re-elected in 1852. Re-elected in 1854. Re-elected in 1856. Lost re-election to Hooper.
John M. Bernhisel	March 4, 1861 – March 3, 1863	Independent	Territory	Elected in 1860. Retired.
Rob Bishop	January 3, 2003 – January 3, 2021	Republican	1st	Elected in 2002. Re-elected in 2004. Re-elected in 2006. Re-elected in 2008. Re-elected in 2010. Re-elected in 2012. Re-elected in 2014. Re-elected in 2016. Re-elected in 2018. Retired to join Thomas Wright's gubernatorial ticket.
Reva Beck Bosone	January 3, 1949 – January 3, 1953	Democratic	2nd	Elected in 1948. Re-elected in 1950. Lost re-election to Dawson.
Laurence J. Burton	January 3, 1963 – January 3, 1971	Republican	1st	Elected in 1962. Re-elected in 1964. Re-elected in 1966. Re-elected in 1968. Retired to run for U.S. Senator.
John T. Caine	November 7, 1882 – March 3, 1889	Democratic	Territory	Elected to finish the vacant term. Re-elected in 1884. Re-elected in 1886.
John T. Caine	March 4, 1889 – March 3, 1893	Populist	Territory	Re-elected in 1888 as a Populist. Re-elected in 1890. Retired.
Chris Cannon	January 3, 1997 – January 3, 2009	Republican	3rd	First elected in 1996. Re-elected in 1998. Re-elected in 2000. Re-elected in 2002. Re-elected in 2004. Re-elected in 2006. Lost renomination to Chaffetz.
Frank J. Cannon	March 4, 1895 – January 4, 1896	Republican	Territory	Elected in 1894. Position eliminated on statehood and retired to run for U.S. senator.
George Q. Cannon	March 4, 1873 – April 20, 1882	Democratic	Territory	Elected in 1872. Re-elected in 1874. Re-elected in 1876. Re-elected in 1878. Re-elected in 1880, but the governor appointed Allen G. Campbell. Cannon successfully contested the election, but denied seat by the House after enactment of Edmunds Act.
Jason Chaffetz	January 3, 2009 – June 30, 2017	Republican	3rd	First elected in 2008. Re-elected in 2010. Re-elected in 2012. Re-elected in 2014. Re-elected in 2016. Resigned for medical reasons.
Don B. Colton	March 4, 1921 – March 3, 1933	Republican	1st	Elected in 1920. Re-elected in 1922. Re-elected in 1924. Re-elected in 1926. Re-elected in 1928. Re-elected in 1930. Lost re-election to Murdock.
Merrill Cook	January 3, 1997 – January 3, 2001	Republican	2nd	Elected in 1996. Re-elected in 1998. Lost renomination to Derek Smith.
John Curtis	November 7, 2017 – January 3, 2025	Republican	3rd	Elected to finish Chaffetz's term. Re-elected in 2018. Re-elected in 2020. Re-elected in 2022. Retired to run for U.S. Senator.
William A. Dawson	January 3, 1947 – January 3, 1949	Republican	2nd	Elected in 1946. Lost re-election to Bosone.
William A. Dawson	January 3, 1953 – January 3, 1959	Republican	2nd	Elected in 1952. Re-elected in 1954. Re-elected in 1956. Lost re-election to King.
Henry Aldous Dixon	January 3, 1955 – January 3, 1961	Republican	1st	Elected in 1954. Re-elected in 1956. Re-elected in 1958. Retired.
Walter K. Granger	January 3, 1941 – January 3, 1953	Democratic	1st	Elected in 1940. Re-elected in 1942. Re-elected in 1944. Re-elected in 1946. Re-elected in 1948. Re-elected in 1950. Retired to run for U.S. Senator.
Enid Greene Mickelsen	January 3, 1995 – January 3, 1997	Republican	2nd	Elected in 1994. Retired.
Jim Hansen	January 3, 1981 – January 3, 2003	Republican	1st	Elected in 1980. Re-elected in 1982. Re-elected in 1984. Re-elected in 1986. Re-elected in 1988. Re-elected in 1990. Re-elected in 1992. Re-elected in 1994. Re-elected in 1996. Re-elected in 1998. Re-elected in 2000. Retired.
William H. Hooper	March 4, 1859 – March 3, 1861	Democratic	Territory	Elected in 1858. Lost re-election to Bernhisel.
William H. Hooper	March 4, 1865 – March 3, 1873	Democratic	Territory	Elected in 1864. Re-elected in 1866. Re-elected in 1868. Re-elected in 1870. Retired.
Allan Turner Howe	January 3, 1975 – January 3, 1977	Democratic	2nd	Elected in 1974. Lost re-election to Marriott.
Joseph Howell	March 4, 1903 – March 3, 1913	Republican	At-large	Elected in 1902. Re-elected in 1904. Re-elected in 1906. Re-elected in 1908. Re-elected in 1910. Redistricted to the 1st district.
Joseph Howell	March 4, 1913 – March 3, 1917	Republican	1st	Redistricted from the at-large district and re-elected in 1912. Re-elected in 1914. Retired.
Jacob Johnson	March 4, 1913 – March 3, 1915	Republican	2nd	Elected in 1912. Lost renomination to Leatherwood.
Mike Kennedy	January 3, 2025 – present	Republican	3rd	Elected in 2024
David S. King	January 3, 1959 – January 3, 1963	Democratic	2nd	Elected in 1958. Re-elected in 1960. Retired to run for U.S. Senator.
David S. King	January 3, 1965 – January 3, 1967	Democratic	2nd	Re-elected in 1964. Lost re-election to Lloyd.
William H. King	March 4, 1897 – March 3, 1899	Democratic	At-large	Elected in 1896. Re-elected in 1898. Lost renomination to B. H. Roberts, who was denied seat on grounds of polygamy.
William H. King	April 2, 1900 – March 3, 1901	Democratic	At-large	Elected to finish Roberts's term. Lost re-election to Sutherland.
John F. Kinney	March 4, 1863 – March 3, 1865	Democratic	Territory	Elected in 1862. Retired.
Elmer O. Leatherwood	March 4, 1921 – December 24, 1929	Republican	2nd	Elected in 1920. Re-elected in 1922. Re-elected in 1924. Re-elected in 1926. Re-elected in 1928. Died.
Sherman P. Lloyd	January 3, 1963 – January 3, 1965	Republican	2nd	Elected in 1962. Retired to run for U.S. Senator.
Sherman P. Lloyd	January 3, 1967 – January 3, 1973	Republican	2nd	Re-elected in 1966. Re-elected in 1968. Re-elected in 1970. Lost re-election to Owens.
Frederick C. Loofbourow	November 4, 1930 – March 3, 1933	Republican	2nd	Elected to finish Leatherwood's term. Elected the same day to the next term. Lost re-election to Robinson.
Mia Love	January 3, 2015 – January 3, 2019	Republican	4th	Elected in 2014. Re-elected in 2016. Lost re-election to McAdams.
Celeste Maloy	November 21, 2023 – present	Republican	2nd	Elected to finish Stewart's term. Re-elected in 2024.
David Daniel Marriott	January 3, 1977 – January 3, 1985	Republican	2nd	Elected in 1976. Re-elected in 1978. Re-elected in 1980. Re-elected in 1982. Retired to run for Governor of Utah.
Jim Matheson	January 3, 2001 – January 3, 2013	Democratic	2nd	Elected in 2000. Re-elected in 2002. Re-elected in 2004. Re-elected in 2006. Re-elected in 2008. Re-elected in 2010. Redistricted to the 4th district.
Jim Matheson	January 3, 2013 – January 3, 2015	Democratic	4th	Redistricted from the 2nd district and re-elected in 2012. Retired.
James Henry Mays	March 4, 1915 – March 3, 1921	Democratic	2nd	Elected in 1914. Re-elected in 1916. Re-elected in 1918. Retired.
Ben McAdams	January 3, 2019 – January 3, 2021	Democratic	4th	Elected in 2018. Lost re-election to B. Owens.
K. Gunn McKay	January 3, 1971 – January 3, 1981	Democratic	1st	Elected in 1970. Re-elected in 1972. Re-elected in 1974. Re-elected in 1976. Re-elected in 1978. Lost re-election to Hansen.
David Smith Monson	January 3, 1985 – January 3, 1987	Republican	2nd	Elected in 1984. Retired.
Blake Moore	January 3, 2021 – present	Republican	1st	Elected in 2020. Re-elected in 2022. Re-elected in 2024.
Abe Murdock	March 4, 1933 – January 3, 1941	Democratic	1st	Elected in 1932. Re-elected in 1934. Re-elected in 1936. Re-elected in 1938. Retired to run for U.S. Senator.
Howard C. Nielson	January 3, 1983 – January 3, 1991	Republican	3rd	Elected in 1982. Re-elected in 1984. Re-elected in 1986. Re-elected in 1988. Retired.
Bill Orton	January 3, 1991 – January 3, 1997	Democratic	3rd	Elected in 1990. Re-elected in 1992. Re-elected in 1994. Lost re-election to C. Cannon.
Burgess Owens	January 3, 2021 – present	Republican	4th	Elected in 2020. Re-elected in 2022. Re-elected in 2024.
Wayne Owens	January 3, 1973 – January 3, 1975	Democratic	2nd	Elected in 1972. Retired to run for U.S. Senator.
Wayne Owens	January 3, 1987 – January 3, 1993	Democratic	2nd	Re-elected in 1986. Re-elected in 1988. Re-elected in 1990. Retired to run for U.S. Senator.
M. Blaine Peterson	January 3, 1961 – January 3, 1963	Democratic	1st	Elected in 1960. Lost re-election to Burton.
Joseph L. Rawlins	March 4, 1893 – March 3, 1895	Democratic	Territory	Elected in 1892. Lost re-election to F.J. Cannon.
J. W. Robinson	March 3, 1933 – January 3, 1947	Democratic	2nd	Elected in 1932. Re-elected in 1934. Re-elected in 1936. Re-elected in 1938. Re-elected in 1940. Re-elected in 1944. Lost re-election to Dawson.
Karen Shepherd	January 3, 1993 – January 3, 1995	Democratic	2nd	Elected in 1992. Lost re-election to Greene.
Chris Stewart	January 3, 2013 – September 15, 2023	Republican	2nd	Elected in 2012. Re-elected in 2014. Re-elected in 2016. Re-elected in 2018. Re-elected in 2020. Re-elected in 2022. Resigned.
Douglas R. Stringfellow	January 3, 1953 – January 3, 1955	Republican	1st	Elected in 1952. Renominated, but replaced on ballot by Dixon due to personal scandal.
George Sutherland	March 4, 1901 – March 3, 1903	Republican	At-large	Elected in 1900. Retired to run for U.S. Senator.
Milton H. Welling	March 4, 1917 – March 3, 1921	Democratic	1st	Elected in 1916. Re-elected in 1918. Retired to run for U.S. Senator.

== See also ==
- List of United States senators from Utah
- Utah's congressional delegations
- Utah's congressional districts
