= 2008 United States House of Representatives elections in Utah =

- November 4, 2008

All 3 Utah seats to the United States House of Representatives
	Majority party	Minority party
Party	Republican	Democratic
Last election	2	1
Seats won	2	1
Seat change	Steady	Steady
Popular vote	503,917	393,761
Percentage	53.79%	42.03%
Swing	▲2.49%	▼0.89%

Republican
40–50%
50–60%
60–70%
70–80%
80–90%
Democratic
50–60%
60–70%
70–80%

The 2008 congressional elections in Utah were held on November 4, 2008 to determine the representatives of the state of Utah in the United States House of Representatives for the 111th Congress from January 3, 2009, until their terms of office expire on January 3, 2011. Incumbent Rob Bishop (R) was reelected in Utah's 1st congressional district. Incumbent Jim Matheson (D) was reelected in Utah's 2nd congressional district. Jason Chaffetz (R) was elected to succeed Chris Cannon (R) in Utah's 3rd congressional district.

Utah has three seats in the House, apportioned according to the 2000 United States census. Representatives are elected for two-year terms. The election coincided with the 2008 U.S. presidential election.

== Overview ==
United States House of Representatives elections in Utah, 2008
Party	Votes	Percentage	Seats	+/–
Republican	503,917	53.79%	2	—
Democratic	393,761	42.03%	1	—
Constitution	27,805	2.97%	0	—
Libertarian	11,356	1.21%	0	—
Totals	936,839	100.00%	3	—

== District 1 ==
2008 Utah's 1st congressional district election

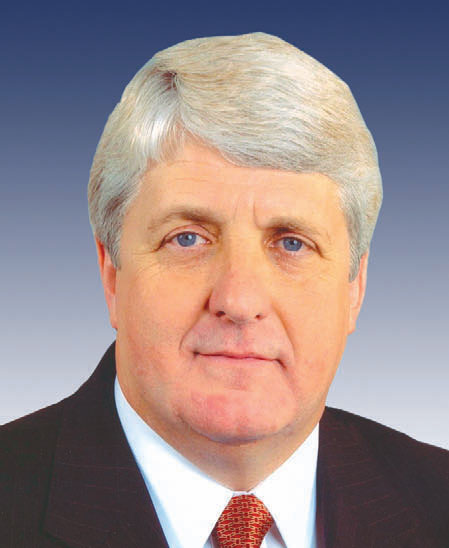

Nominee	Rob Bishop	Morgan Bowen
Party	Republican	Democratic
Popular vote	196,799	92,469
Percentage	64.9%	30.5%
- County results Bishop: 60–70% 70–80% 80–90% Bowen: 40–50% 50–60% 60–70%
U.S. Representative before election
Rob Bishop
Republican
Elected U.S. Representative
Rob Bishop
Republican

This district covers the northwest area of Utah including Ogden, Logan, Tooele, the northwest portion of Salt Lake City, and the entirety of the Great Salt Lake. It has been represented by Republican Rob Bishop since January 2003. His challengers were Democrat Morgan Bowen, Libertarian Joseph Geddes Buchman, and Constitution candidate Kirk D. Pearson.

=== Predictions ===
Source	Ranking	As of
The Cook Political Report	Safe R	November 6, 2008
Rothenberg	Safe R	November 2, 2008
Sabato's Crystal Ball	Safe R	November 6, 2008
Real Clear Politics	Safe R	November 7, 2008
CQ Politics	Safe R	November 6, 2008

Utah's 1st congressional district election, 2008
Party	Candidate	Votes	%
Republican	Rob Bishop (inc.)	196,799	64.85%
Democratic	Morgan Bowen	92,469	30.47%
Constitution	Kirk D. Pearson	7,397	2.44%
Libertarian	Joseph G. Buchman	6,780	2.24%
Total votes		303,445	100.00%
Republican hold			

== District 2 ==
2008 Utah's 2nd congressional district election

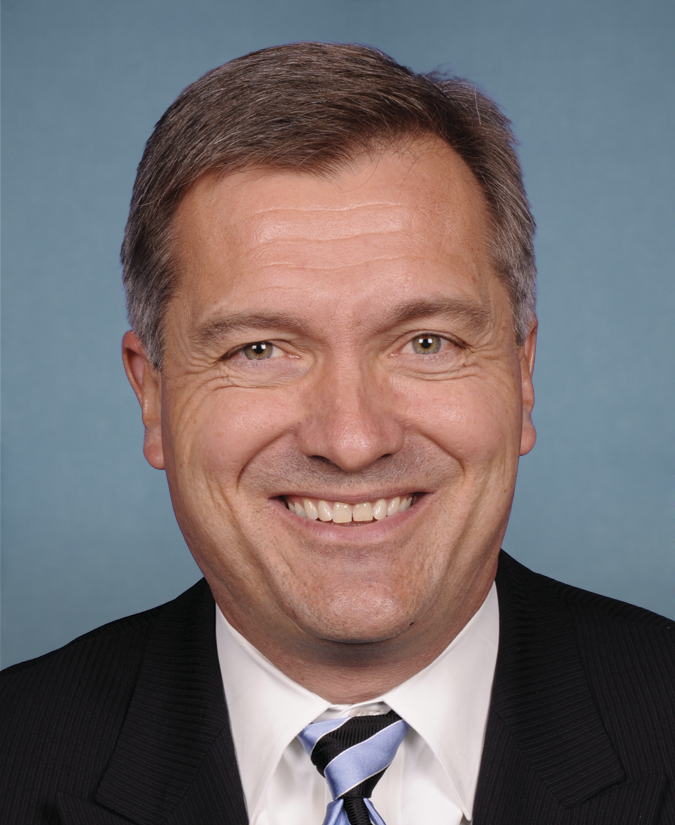

Nominee	Jim Matheson	Bill Dew
Party	Democratic	Republican
Popular vote	220,666	120,083
Percentage	63.0%	34.5%
- County results Matheson: 50–60% 60–70% 70–80% Dew: 40–50% 50–60%
U.S. Representative before election
Jim Matheson
Democratic
Elected U.S. Representative
Jim Matheson
Democratic

This district covers the largely rural southern and eastern portions of Utah (including Saint George and Moab in the south and Vernal in the east), as well as the east side of urban Salt Lake County, the northern portion of Utah County, and Wasatch County. It has been represented by Democrat Jim Matheson since 2001. His challengers were Republican Bill Dew, Libertarian Mathew Arndt and Independent Dennis Ray Emery.

=== Predictions ===
Source	Ranking	As of
The Cook Political Report	Safe D	November 6, 2008
Rothenberg	Safe D	November 2, 2008
Sabato's Crystal Ball	Safe D	November 6, 2008
Real Clear Politics	Safe D	November 7, 2008
CQ Politics	Safe D	November 6, 2008

Utah's 2nd congressional district election, 2008
Party	Candidate	Votes	%
Democratic	Jim Matheson (inc.)	220,666	63.35%
Republican	Bill Dew	120,083	34.47%
Libertarian	Matthew Arndt	4,576	1.32%
Constitution	Dennis Ray Emery	3,000	0.86%
Total votes		348,325	100.00%
Democratic hold			

== District 3 ==
2008 Utah's 3rd congressional district election

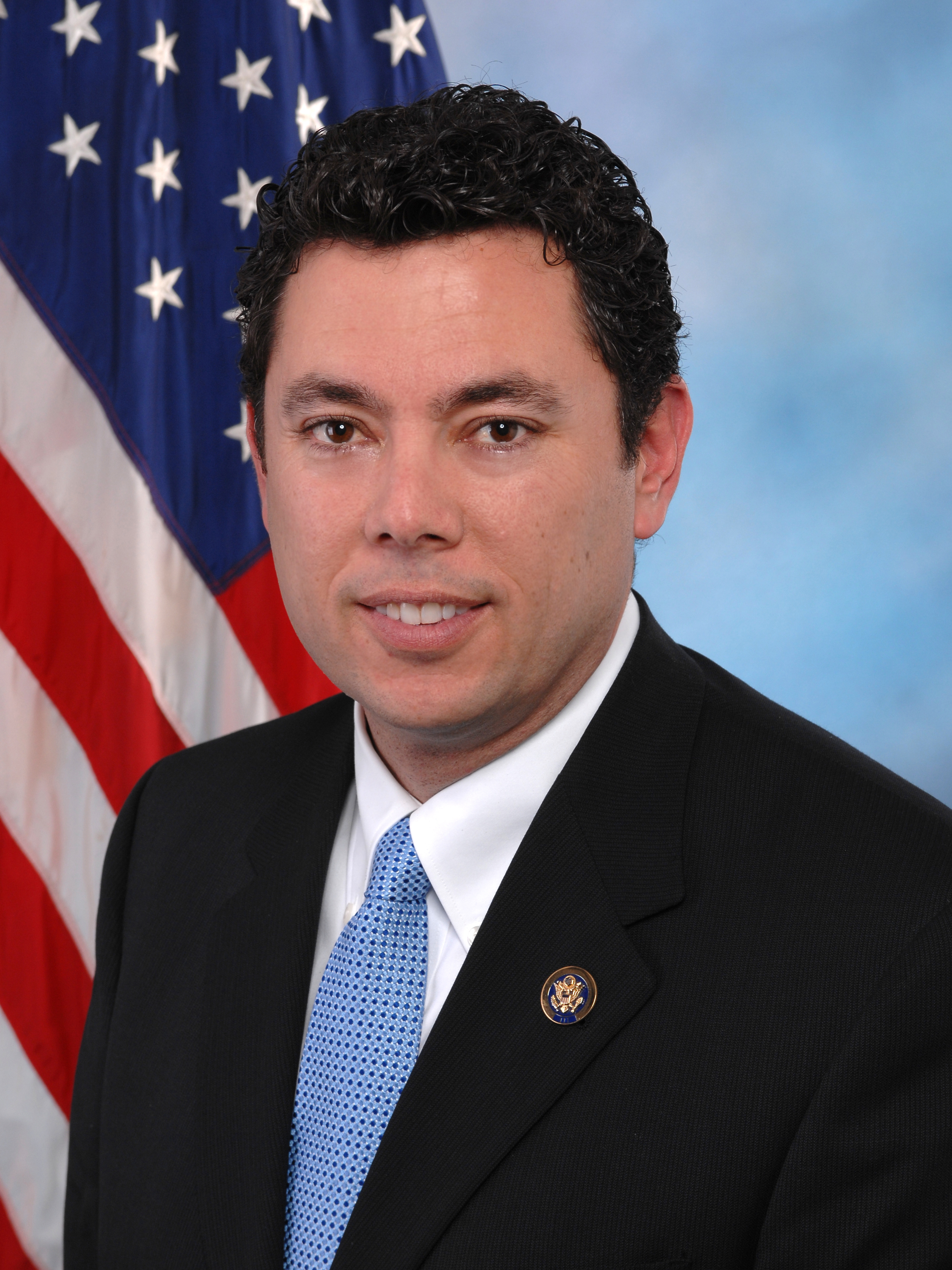

Nominee	Jason Chaffetz	Bennion Spencer	Jim Noorlander
Party	Republican	Democratic	Constitution
Popular vote	187,035	80,626	17,408
Percentage	65.6%	28.3%	6.1%
- County results Chaffetz: 50–60% 60–70% 70–80%
U.S. Representative before election
Chris Cannon
Republican
Elected U.S. Representative
Jason Chaffetz
Republican

This district covers central and west central Utah, including nearly all of Utah County and the west side of Salt Lake County. It has been represented by Republican Chris Cannon since 1997, who lost to Jason Chaffetz in the primary. His challengers were Democrat Bennion Spencer and Constitution Party Candidate Jim Noorlander.

2008 Republican primary results Chaffetz: 50–60%; 60–70%; Cannon: 50–60%

=== Predictions ===
Source	Ranking	As of
The Cook Political Report	Safe R	November 6, 2008
Rothenberg	Safe R	November 2, 2008
Sabato's Crystal Ball	Safe R	November 6, 2008
Real Clear Politics	Safe R	November 7, 2008
CQ Politics	Safe R	November 6, 2008

Utah's 3rd congressional district election, 2008
Party	Candidate	Votes	%
Republican	Jason Chaffetz	187,035	65.61%
Democratic	Bennion L. Spencer	80,626	28.28%
Constitution	Jim Noorlander	17,408	6.11%
Total votes		285,069	100.00%
Republican hold			

== See also ==
United States House of Representatives elections, 2008

Preceded by 2006 elections	United States House elections in Utah; 2008	Succeeded by 2010 elections
