= 2010 United States House of Representatives elections in Utah =

- November 2, 2010

All 3 Utah seats to the United States House of Representatives
	Majority party	Minority party
Party	Republican	Democratic
Last election	2	1
Seats won	2	1
Seat change	Steady	Steady
Popular vote	390,969	218,236
Percentage	61.04%	34.07%
Swing	▲7.25%	▼7.96%

Republican
50–60%
60–70%
70–80%
80–90%
Democratic
40–50%
50–60%
60–70%

Elections were held on November 2, 2010, to determine Utah's three members of the United States House of Representatives. Representatives were elected for two-year terms to serve in the 112th United States Congress from January 3, 2011, until January 3, 2013. Primary elections were held on June 22, 2010.

All three of Utah's U.S. Representatives (Republicans Rob Bishop of the 1st district and Jason Chaffetz of the 3rd district, and Democrat Jim Matheson of the 2nd district) were re-elected. Of the three elections, only the 2nd district was rated as competitive by The Cook Political Report.

A total of 640,495 votes were cast, of which 390,969 (61.04 percent) were for Republican candidates, 218,236 (34.07 percent) were for Democratic candidates, 18,317 (2.86 percent) were for Constitution Party candidates, 7,252 (1.13 percent) were for Libertarian Party candidates and 5,721 (0.89 percent) were for independent candidates.

== Overview ==
Results of the 2010 United States House of Representatives elections in Utah by district:

District	Republican		Democratic		Others		Total		Result
District	Votes	%	Votes	%	Votes	%	Votes	%	Result
District 1	135,247	69.19%	46,765	23.93%	13,450	6.88%	195,462	100%	Republican Hold
District 2	116,001	46.06%	127,151	50.49%	8,695	3.45%	251,847	100%	Democratic Hold
District 3	139,721	72.32%	44,320	22.94%	9,145	4.73%	193,186	100%	Republican Hold
Total	390,969	61.04%	218,236	34.07%	31,290	4.89%	640,495	100%	

== District 1 ==
2010 Utah's 1st congressional district election

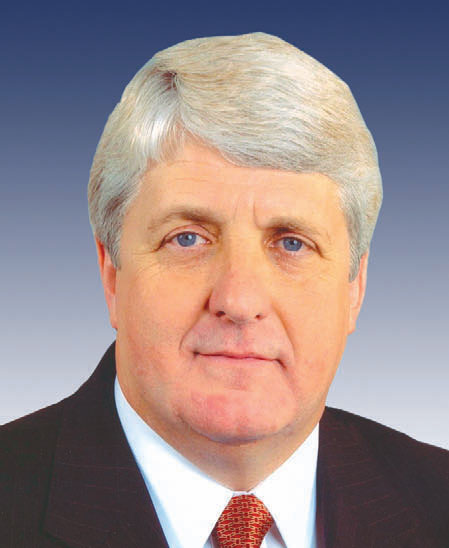

Nominee	Rob Bishop	Morgan Bowen
Party	Republican	Democratic
Popular vote	135,247	46,765
Percentage	69.2%	23.9%
- County results Bishop: 50–60% 60–70% 70–80% 80–90% Bowen: 50–60%
U.S. Representative before election
Rob Bishop
Republican
Elected U.S. Representative
Rob Bishop
Republican

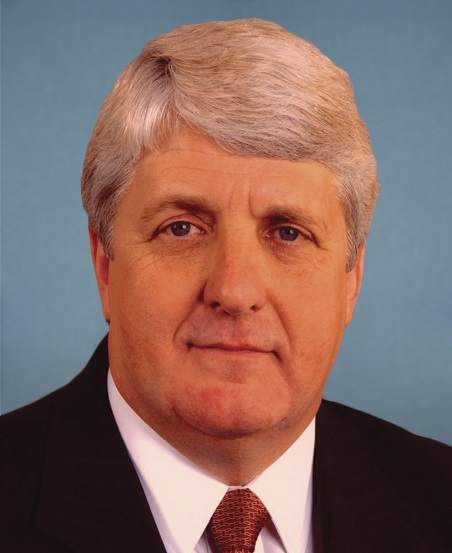
Rob Bishop, who was re-elected in the 1st district

The 1st district included Bountiful, Clearfield, Layton, Logan, Ogden, Roy, Tooele and part of Salt Lake City. The district's population was 81 percent white and 13 percent Hispanic (see Race and ethnicity in the United States census); 90 percent were high school graduates and 28 percent had received a bachelor's degree or higher. Its median income was $55,788. In the 2008 presidential election the district gave 64 percent of its vote to Republican nominee John McCain and 33 percent to Democratic nominee Barack Obama.

Republican Rob Bishop, who took office in 2003, was the incumbent. Bishop was re-elected in 2008 with 65 percent of the vote. In 2010 Bishop's opponent in the general election was Democratic nominee Morgan Bowen, an LDS seminary teacher at Sky View High School. Constitution Party nominee Kirk Pearson and Libertarian Party nominee Jared Paul Stratton also ran. Bishop and Bowen were unopposed in their respective party primaries.

Bishop raised $278,327 and spent $302,771. Bowen raised $11,550 and spent $11,309. A poll of 400 likely voters, conducted by Mason-Dixon Polling & Research Inc. between October 25 and 27, 2010, 65 percent of respondents supported Bishop while 13 percent favored Bowen. In a poll of 375 active voters, conducted by Dan Jones & Associates between October 25 and 28, 2010, Bishop led with 66 percent to Bowen's 21 percent, while 4 percent supported Pearson, Stratton had the support of 1 percent, 1 percent favored other candidates and 7 percent were undecided.

Prior to the election FiveThirtyEight's forecast gave Bishop a 100 percent chance of winning and projected that he would receive 73 percent of the vote to Bowen's 24 percent. On election day Bishop was re-elected with 69 percent of the vote to Bowen's 24 percent. Bishop was again re-elected in 2012 and 2014.

=== Predictions ===
Source	Ranking	As of
The Cook Political Report	Safe R	November 1, 2010
Rothenberg	Safe R	November 1, 2010
Sabato's Crystal Ball	Safe R	November 1, 2010
RCP	Safe R	November 1, 2010
CQ Politics	Safe R	October 28, 2010
New York Times	Safe R	November 1, 2010
FiveThirtyEight	Safe R	November 1, 2010

=== General election results ===
Utah's 1st district general election, November 2, 2010
Party	Candidate	Votes	%
Republican	Rob Bishop (incumbent)	135,247	69.19%
Democratic	Morgan Bowen	46,765	23.93%
Constitution	Kirk Pearson	9,143	4.68%
Libertarian	Jared Paul Stratton	4,307	2.20%
Total votes		195,462	100.00%

== District 2 ==
2010 Utah's 2nd congressional district election

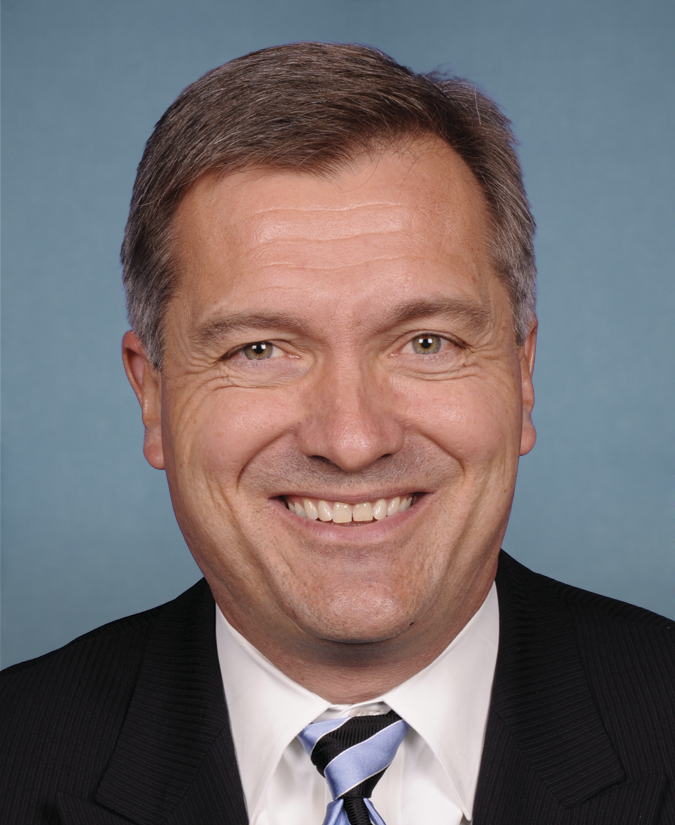

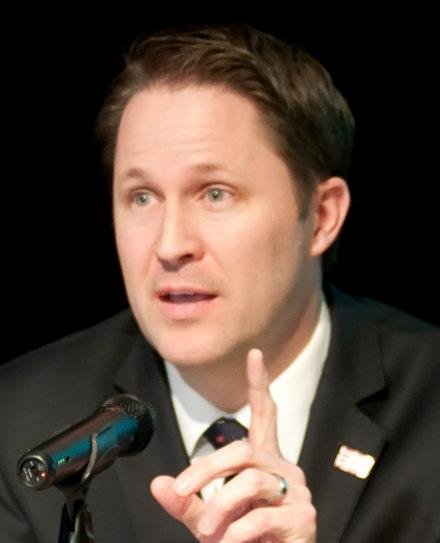
Nominee	Jim Matheson	Morgan Philpot
Party	Democratic	Republican
Popular vote	127,151	116,001
Percentage	50.5%	46.1%
- County results Matheson: 50–60% 60–70% Philpot: 50–60% 60–70% 70–80%
U.S. Representative before election
Jim Matheson
Democratic
Elected U.S. Representative
Jim Matheson
Democratic

The 2nd district included Millcreek, Sandy, St. George and parts of Lehi, Murray and Salt Lake City. The district's population was 86 percent white and 8 percent Hispanic (see Race and ethnicity in the United States census); 92 percent were high school graduates and 33 percent had received a bachelor's degree or higher. Its median income was $55,863. In the 2008 presidential election the district gave 58 percent of its vote to Republican nominee John McCain and 40 percent to Democratic nominee Barack Obama.

Democrat Jim Matheson, who took office in 2001, was the incumbent. Matheson was re-elected in 2008 with 63 percent of the vote. In July 2009 Matheson said he would seek re-election rather than running for governor or for the U.S. Senate. In 2010 Matheson's opponent in the general election was Republican nominee Morgan Philpot, a former member of the Utah House of Representatives. Independent candidates Dave Glissmeyer, the founder of ProTel NetWorks; and Wayne L. Hill; and Constitution Party nominee Randall Hinton, a web developer, also ran. Claudia Wright, a teacher, also sought the Democratic nomination. Scott McCoy, a member of the Utah State Senate, suggested in November 2009 that Matheson should be challenged in the Democratic primary in response to his vote against the Patient Protection and Affordable Care Act, but said he would not run. Philpot was unopposed in the Republican primary.

Matheson raised $1,803,801 and spent $2,465,527. Philpot raised $386,467 and spent the same amount. Glissmeyer raised $8,987 and spent $11,150.

In a poll of 200 registered voters, conducted by Western Wats between September 30 and October 3, 2010, Matheson led with 46 percent to Philpot's 30 percent. A poll of 226 likely voters, conducted by Dan Jones & Associates, the results of which were published in October 2010, found Matheson leading with 57 percent to Philpot's 31 percent, while Glissmeyer and Hinton had the support of 1 percent apiece, less than 1 percent backed Hill, and 9 percent were undecided. In a poll of 400 likely voters, conducted by Mason-Dixon Polling & Research Inc. between October 25 and 27, 2010, 48 percent of respondents supported Matheson while 35 percent favored Philpot and 11 percent were undecided. A poll of 456 active voters, conducted by Dan Jones & Associates between October 25 and 28, 2010, found Matheson leading with 51 percent to Philpot's 39 percent, while 1 percent supported Hinton, 1 percent backed other candidates, and 7 percent were undecided.

Prior to the election FiveThirtyEight's forecast gave Matheson an 87 percent chance of winning and projected that he would receive 53 percent of the vote to Philpot's 44 percent. On election day Matheson was re-elected with 50 percent of the vote to Philpot's 46 percent. Matheson was again re-elected in 2012 and retired rather than seeking re-election in 2014. He was succeeded by Republican Mia Love.

=== Democratic primary results ===
Utah's 2nd district Democratic primary, June 22, 2010
Party	Candidate	Votes	%
Democratic	Jim Matheson (incumbent)	23,067	67.26%
Democratic	Claudia Wright	11,227	32.74%
Total votes		34,294	100.00%

==== Predictions ====
Source	Ranking	As of
The Cook Political Report	Likely D	November 1, 2010
Rothenberg	Safe D	November 1, 2010
Sabato's Crystal Ball	Safe D	November 1, 2010
RCP	Likely D	November 1, 2010
CQ Politics	Safe D	October 28, 2010
New York Times	Safe D	November 1, 2010
FiveThirtyEight	Likely D	November 1, 2010

=== General election results ===
Utah's 2nd district general election, November 2, 2010
Party	Candidate	Votes	%
Democratic	Jim Matheson (incumbent)	127,151	50.49%
Republican	Morgan Philpot	116,001	46.06%
Constitution	Randall Hinton	4,578	1.82%
Independent	David Glissmeyer	2,391	0.95%
Independent	Wayne L. Hill	1,726	0.68%
Total votes		251,847	100.00%

== District 3 ==
2010 Utah's 3rd congressional district election

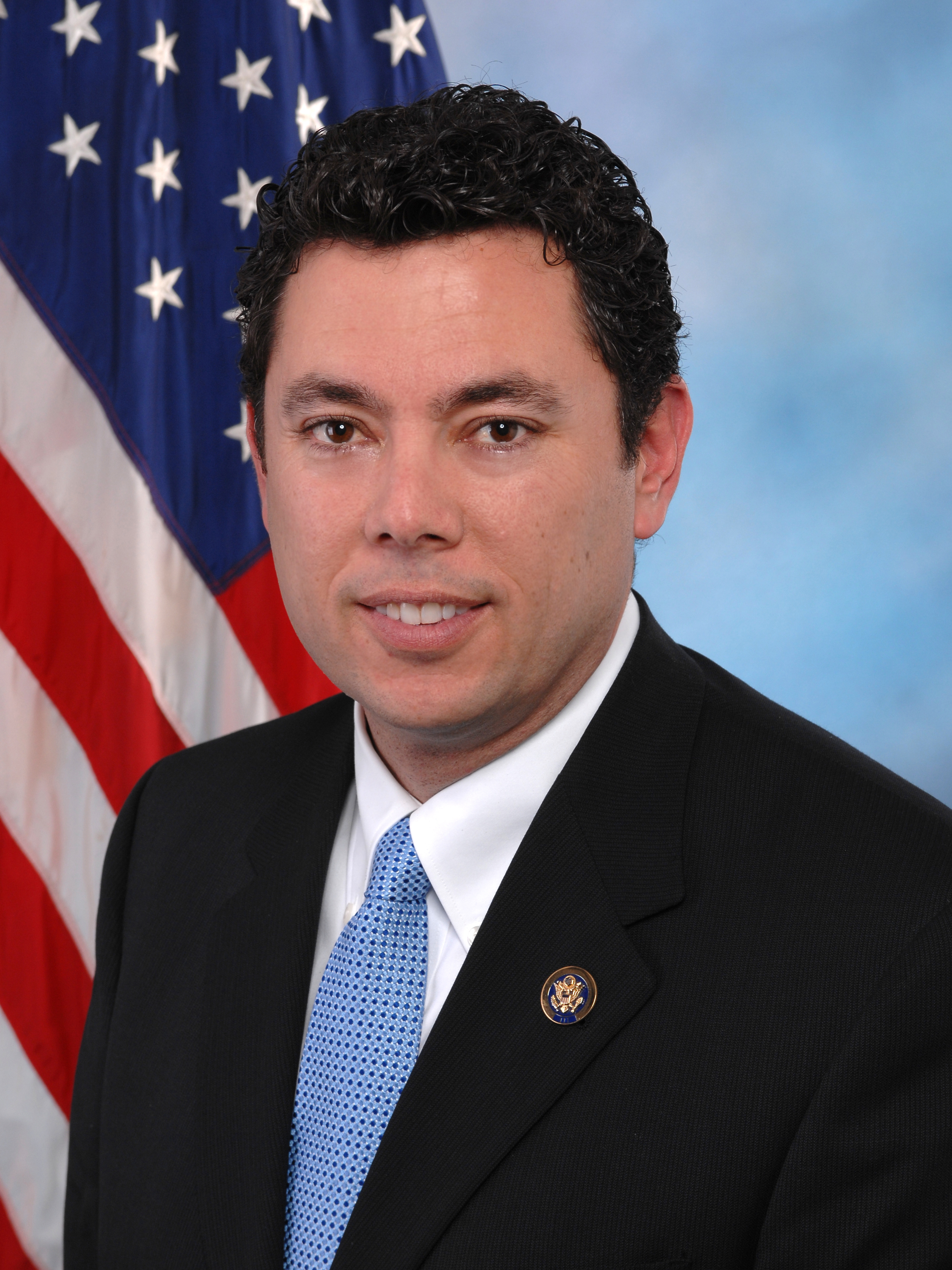

Nominee	Jason Chaffetz	Karen Hyer
Party	Republican	Democratic
Popular vote	139,721	44,320
Percentage	72.3%	22.9%
- County results Chaffetz: 60–70% 70–80% 80–90%
U.S. Representative before election
Jason Chaffetz
Republican
Elected U.S. Representative
Jason Chaffetz
Republican

The 3rd district included Orem, Provo, South Jordan, Taylorsville, West Jordan and West Valley City. The district's population was 80 percent white and 14 percent Hispanic (see Race and ethnicity in the United States census); 89 percent were high school graduates and 26 percent had received a bachelor's degree or higher. Its median income was $57,852. In the 2008 presidential election the district gave 67 percent of its vote to Republican nominee John McCain and 29 percent to Democratic nominee Barack Obama.

Republican Jason Chaffetz, who took office in 2009, was the incumbent. Chaffetz was elected in 2008 with 66 percent of the vote. Chaffetz announced in January 2010 that he would seek re-election rather than running for the U.S. Senate. In 2010 Chaffetz's opponent in the general election was Democratic nominee Karen Hyer, an adjunct professor at Brigham Young University. Independent candidate Joe Puente, Libertarian Party nominee Jake Shannon, and Constitution Party nominee Douglas Sligting also ran.

Chaffetz raised $647,194 and spent $540,646. Hyer raised $23,818 and spent the same amount. Sligtig raised $3,536 and spent $2,225.

In a poll of 400 likely voters, conducted by Mason-Dixon Polling & Research Inc. between October 25 and 27, 2010, Chaffetz led with 56 percent to Hyer's 11 percent. A poll of 375 active voters, conducted by Dan Jones & Associates between October 25 and 28, 2010, found Chaffetz leading with 70 percent to Hyer's 19 percent, while Sligting had the support of 2 percent, Puente had the support of 1 percent, 2 percent chose other candidates and 6 percent were undecided. Prior to the election FiveThirtyEight's forecast gave Chaffetz a 100 percent chance of winning and projected that he would receive 73 percent of the vote to Hyer's 23 percent. On election day Chaffetz was re-elected with 72 percent of the vote to Hyer's 23 percent. Chaffetz was again re-elected in 2012 and 2014.

=== Predictions ===
Source	Ranking	As of
The Cook Political Report	Safe R	November 1, 2010
Rothenberg	Safe R	November 1, 2010
Sabato's Crystal Ball	Safe R	November 1, 2010
RCP	Safe R	November 1, 2010
CQ Politics	Safe R	October 28, 2010
New York Times	Safe R	November 1, 2010
FiveThirtyEight	Safe R	November 1, 2010

=== General election results ===
Utah's 3rd district general election, November 2, 2010
Party	Candidate	Votes	%
Republican	Jason Chaffetz (incumbent)	139,721	72.32%
Democratic	Karen Hyer	44,320	22.94%
Constitution	Douglas Sligting	4,596	2.38%
Libertarian	Jake Shannon	2,945	1.52%
Independent	Joe Puente	1,604	0.83%
Total votes		193,186	100.00%

=== External links ===
- Joe Puente campaign announcement at the blog Puente's Perspective (February 1, 2011)

== See also ==
- List of United States representatives from Utah
- Utah's congressional delegations
