= 2004 United States House of Representatives elections in Utah =

2004 elections to the United States House of Representatives in Utah

- November 2, 2004

All 3 Utah seats to the United States House of Representatives
	Majority party	Minority party
Party	Republican	Democratic
Last election	2	1
Seats won	2	1
Seat change	Steady	Steady
Popular vote	520,403	361,628
Percentage	57.26%	39.79%
Swing	▼0.53%	▲0.05%

Republican
40–50%
50–60%
60–70%
70–80%
80–90%
Democratic
40–50%
50–60%
60–70%

The Utah congressional elections of 2004 were held on November 2, 2004, as part of the United States general elections of 2004 with all three House seats up for election. The winners served from January 3, 2005, to January 3, 2007. The election coincided with the 2004 presidential election.

== Overview ==
=== Statewide ===
Party	Candidates	Votes		Seats		
Party	Candidates	No.	%	No.	+/–	%
Republican	3	520,403	57.26	2	Steady	66.67
Democratic	3	361,628	39.79	1	Steady	33.33
Constitution	3	13,140	1.45	0	Steady	0.0
Personal Choice	3	7,806	0.86	0	Steady	0.0
Libertarian	1	3,691	0.41	0	Steady	0.0
Green	1	2,189	0.24	0	Steady	0.0
Total	14	908,857	100.0	3	Steady	100.0

Popular vote
Republican	57.26%
Democratic	39.79%
Constitution	1.45%
Other	1.51%

House seats
Republican	66.67%
Democratic	33.33%

=== By district ===
Results of the 2004 United States House of Representatives elections in Utah by district:

District	Republican		Democratic		Others		Total		Result
District	Votes	%	Votes	%	Votes	%	Votes	%	Result
District 1	199,615	67.91%	85,630	29.13%	8,716	2.97%	293,961	100.0%	Republican hold
District 2	147,778	43.21%	187,250	54.76%	6,940	2.03%	341,968	100.0%	Democratic hold
District 3	173,010	63.39%	88,748	32.52%	11,170	4.09%	272,928	100.0%	Republican hold
Total	520,403	57.26%	361,628	39.79%	26,826	2.95%	908,857	100.0%	

== District 1 ==
2004 Utah's 1st congressional district election
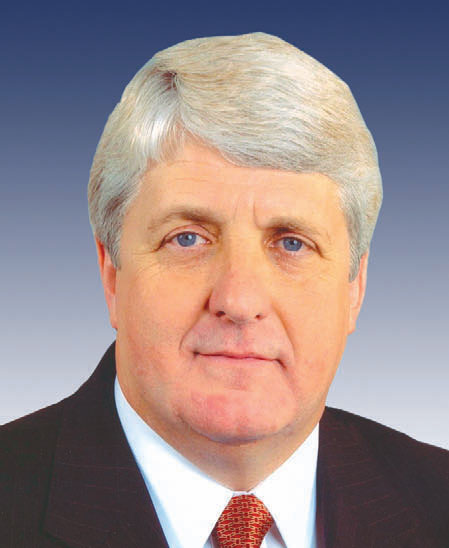

Nominee	Rob Bishop	Steven Thompson
Party	Republican	Democratic
Popular vote	199,615	85,630
Percentage	67.9%	29.1%
U.S. Representative before election
Rob Bishop
Republican
Elected U.S. Representative
Rob Bishop
Republican

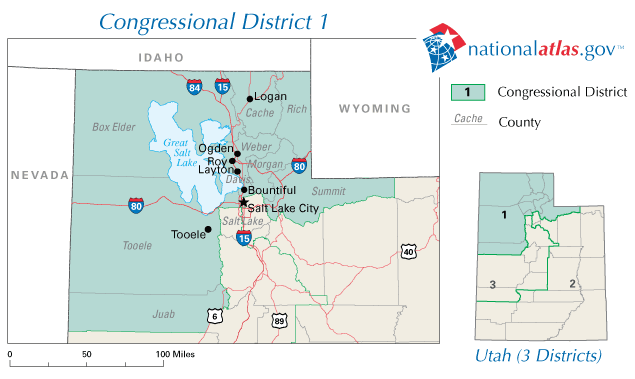

Incumbent Republican Rob Bishop, who had represented the district since 2003, ran for re-election. He was elected with 60.69% of the vote in 2002.

=== Republican primary ===
==== Candidates ====
===== Nominee =====
- Rob Bishop, incumbent U.S. Representative

=== Democratic primary ===
==== Candidates ====
===== Nominee =====
- Steven Thompson, Logan City Council member

=== Constitution primary ===
==== Candidates ====
===== Nominee =====
- Charles Johnston

=== Personal Choice primary ===
==== Candidates ====
===== Nominee =====
- Richard Soderberg

=== General election ===
==== Polling ====
Poll source	Date(s) administered	Sample size (Note: Key: A – all adults RV – registered voters LV – likely voters V – unclear)	Margin of error	Rob Bishop (R)	Steven Thompson (D)	Other	Undecided
Dan Jones & Associates	July 6–10, 2004	? (V)	±6.5%	55%	24%	?%	21%

==== Predictions ====
Source	Ranking	As of
The Cook Political Report	Safe R	October 29, 2004
Sabato's Crystal Ball	Safe R	November 1, 2004

==== Results ====
Utah's 1st Congressional district election, 2004
Party	Candidate	Votes	%
Republican	Rob Bishop (Incumbent)	199,615	67.9
Democratic	Steven Thompson	85,630	29.1
Constitution	Charles Johnston	4,510	1.5
Personal Choice	Richard Soderberg	4,206	1.4
Majority		113,985	38.8
Total votes		293,961	100.0
Republican hold			

==== Finances ====
===== Campaigns =====
Candidate (party)	Raised	Spent	Cash on hand
Rob Bishop (R)	$437,648	$435,494	$2,805
Stephen Thompson (D)	$73,375	$72,540	$833
Charles Johnston (C)	Unreported		
Richard Soderberg (PC)	Unreported		

===== Outside Spending =====
Candidate (party)	Supported	Opposed
Rob Bishop (R)	$783	$0
Stephen Thompson (D)	$0	$0
Charles Johnston (C)	$0	$0
Richard Soderberg (PC)	$0	$0

== District 2 ==
2004 Utah's 2nd congressional district election
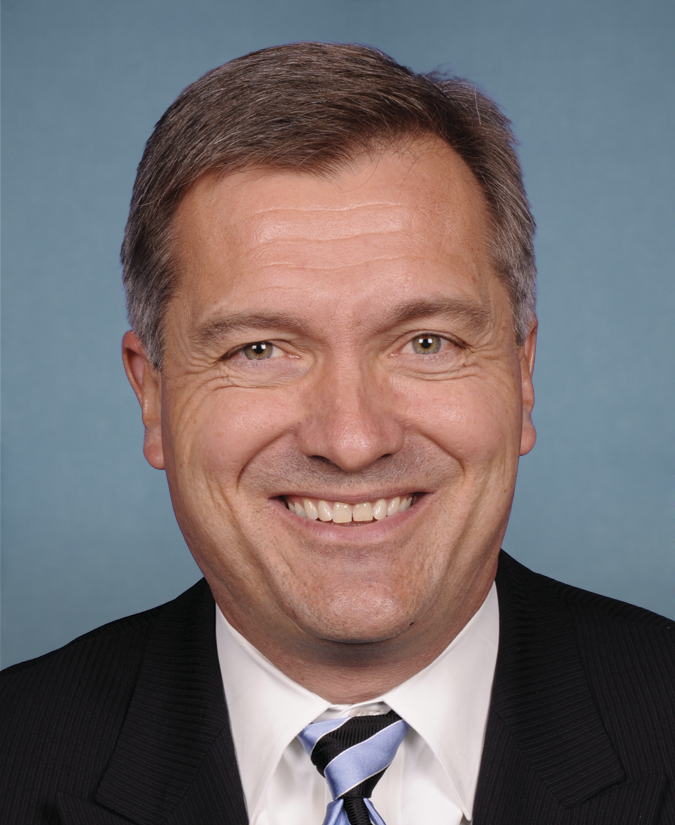

Nominee	Jim Matheson	John Swallow
Party	Democratic	Republican
Popular vote	187,250	147,778
Percentage	54.8%	43.2%
U.S. Representative before election
Jim Matheson
Democratic
Elected U.S. Representative
Jim Matheson
Democratic

Incumbent Democratic Jim Matheson, who had represented the district since 2001, ran for re-election. He was re–elected with 49.43% of the vote in 2002.

=== Democratic primary ===
==== Candidates ====
===== Nominee =====
- Jim Matheson, incumbent U.S. Representative

=== Republican primary ===
==== Candidates ====
===== Nominee =====
- John Swallow, former state representative and nominee for this seat in 2002

===== Eliminated in primary =====
- Tim Bridgewater, businessman and candidate for this seat in 2002

==== Results ====
Republican Primary Election
Party	Candidate	Votes	%
Republican	John Swallow	28,137	53.0
Republican	Tim Bridgewater	24,960	47.0
Total votes		53,097	100.0

=== Green primary ===
==== Candidates ====
===== Nominee =====
- Patrick Diehl

=== Constitution primary ===
==== Candidates ====
===== Nominee =====
- Jeremy Petersen

=== Personal Choice primary ===
==== Candidates ====
===== Nominee =====
- Ronald Amos

=== General election ===
==== Polling ====
Poll source	Date(s) administered	Sample size	Margin of error	Jim Matheson (D)	John Swallow (R)	Other	Undecided
Dan Jones & Associates	July 6–10, 2004	327 (RV)	±6.5%	58%	24%	?%	18%

==== Predictions ====
Source	Ranking	As of
The Cook Political Report	Lean D	October 29, 2004
Sabato's Crystal Ball	Lean D	November 1, 2004

==== Results ====
Utah's 2nd Congressional district election, 2004
Party	Candidate	Votes	%
Democratic	Jim Matheson (Incumbent)	187,250	54.8
Republican	John Swallow	147,778	43.2
Constitution	Jeremy Petersen	3,541	1.0
Green	Patrick Diehl	2,189	0.6
Personal Choice	Ronald Amos	1,210	0.4
Majority		39,472	11.5
Total votes		341,968	100.0
Democratic hold			

==== Finances ====
===== Campaigns =====
Candidate (party)	Raised	Spent	Cash on hand
Jim Matheson (D)	$1,966,015	$2,021,524	$65,328
John Swallow (R)	$1,477,450	$1,457,198	$10,222
Patrick Diehl (G)	Unreported		
Jeremy Petersen (C)	Unreported		
Ronald Amos (PC)	Unreported		

===== Outside Spending =====
Candidate (party)	Supported	Opposed
Jim Matheson (D)	$744,372	$692,129
John Swallow (R)	$313,232	$0
Patrick Diehl (G)	$0	$0
Jeremy Petersen (C)	$0	$0
Ronald Amos (PC)	$0	$0

== District 3 ==
2004 Utah's 3rd congressional district election
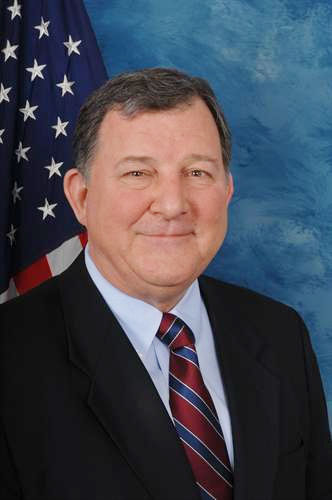

Nominee	Chris Cannon	Beau Babka
Party	Republican	Democratic
Popular vote	173,010	88,748
Percentage	63.4%	32.5%
U.S. Representative before election
Chris Cannon
Republican
Elected U.S. Representative
Chris Cannon
Republican

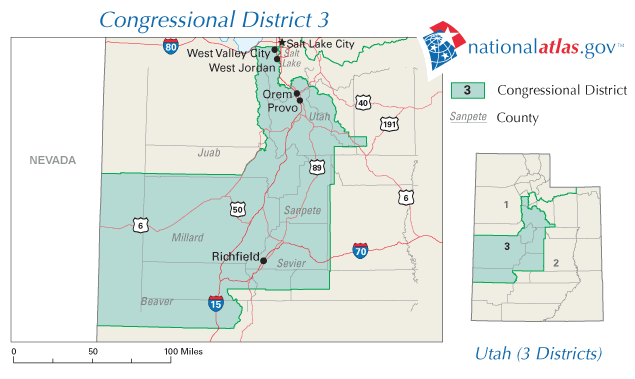

Incumbent Republican Chris Cannon, who had represented the district since 1997, ran for re-election. He was re–elected with 67.43% of the vote in 2002.

=== Republican primary ===
==== Candidates ====
===== Nominee =====
- Chris Cannon, incumbent U.S. Representative

===== Eliminated in primary =====
- Matt Throckmorton, former state representative and candidate for this seat in 2002

==== Campaign ====
Cannon was challenged from the right in a race in which the major issue dividing the candidates was immigration policy.

==== Results ====
Republican Primary Election
Party	Candidate	Votes	%
Republican	Chris Cannon	27,663	58.4
Republican	Matt Throckmorton	19,672	41.6
Total votes		47,335	100.0

=== Democratic primary ===
==== Candidates ====
===== Nominee =====
- Beau Babka, police captain

=== Libertarian primary ===
==== Candidates ====
===== Nominee =====
- Jim Dexter

=== Constitution primary ===
==== Candidates ====
===== Nominee =====
- Ronald Winfield

=== Personal Choice primary ===
==== Candidates ====
===== Nominee =====
- Curtis James

=== General election ===
==== Polling ====
Poll source	Date(s) administered	Sample size	Margin of error	Chris Cannon (R)	Beau Babka (D)	Other	Undecided
Dan Jones & Associates	July 6–10, 2004	? (V)	±6.5%	56%	24%	?%	20%

==== Predictions ====
Source	Ranking	As of
The Cook Political Report	Safe R	October 29, 2004
Sabato's Crystal Ball	Safe R	November 1, 2004

==== Results ====
Utah's 3rd Congressional district election, 2004
Party	Candidate	Votes	%
Republican	Chris Cannon (Incumbent)	173,010	63.4
Democratic	Beau Babka	88,748	32.5
Constitution	Ronald Winfield	5,089	1.9
Libertarian	Jim Dexter	3,691	1.4
Personal Choice	Curtis James	2,390	0.9
Majority		84,262	30.9
Total votes		272,928	100.0
Republican hold			

==== Finances ====
===== Campaigns =====
Candidate (party)	Raised	Spent	Cash on hand
Chris Cannon (R)	$640,259	$634,195	$5,167
Beau Babka (D)	$35,337	$35,111	$338
Jim Dexter (L)	Unreported		
Ronald Winfield (C)	Unreported		
Curtis James (PC)	Unreported		

===== Outside Spending =====
Candidate (party)	Supported	Opposed
Chris Cannon (R)	$1,097	$0
Beau Babka (D)	$0	$0
Jim Dexter (L)	$0	$0
Ronald Winfield (C)	$0	$0
Curtis James (PC)	$0	$0

== See also ==
- 2004 Utah elections
