= 2012 United States House of Representatives elections in Utah =

- November 6, 2012

All 4 Utah seats to the United States House of Representatives
	Majority party	Minority party
Party	Republican	Democratic
Last election	2	1
Seats won	3	1
Seat change	▲1	Steady
Popular vote	647,873	324,309
Percentage	64.86%	32.47%
Swing	▲3.82%	▼1.6%

Republican
50–60%
60–70%
70–80%
80–90%
Democratic
40–50%
50–60%

The 2012 United States House of Representatives elections in Utah were held on Tuesday, November 6, 2012, and elected the four U.S. representatives from the state of Utah, an increase of one seat in reapportionment following the 2010 United States census. The elections coincided with the elections of other federal and state offices, including a quadrennial federal presidential election, a concurrent quadrennial statewide gubernatorial election, all other simultaneous quadrennial statewide executive official election, and an election to the U.S. Senate. Primary elections were held on June 26, 2012.

== Overview ==
United States House of Representatives elections in Utah, 2012
Party	Votes	Percentage	Seats Before	Seats After	+/–
Republican	647,873	64.86%	2	3	+1
Democratic	324,309	32.47%	1	1	-
Constitution	14,481	1.45%	0	0	-
Libertarian	6,439	0.64%	0	0	-
Independent	5,795	0.58%	0	0	-
Totals	998,897	100.00%	3	4	+1

== Redistricting ==
In Utah, the redistricting process was controlled by members of the Republican Party, who formed a majority on the State Legislature's redistricting committee. The plan, passed in October 2011, divided Salt Lake County among three districts, which Republicans argued would require Utah's U.S. representatives to focus on both urban and rural issues. Jim Dabakis, the chair of the Utah Democratic Party, argued that the map constituted a gerrymander designed to benefit the Republican Party.

== District 1 ==
2012 Utah's 1st congressional district election
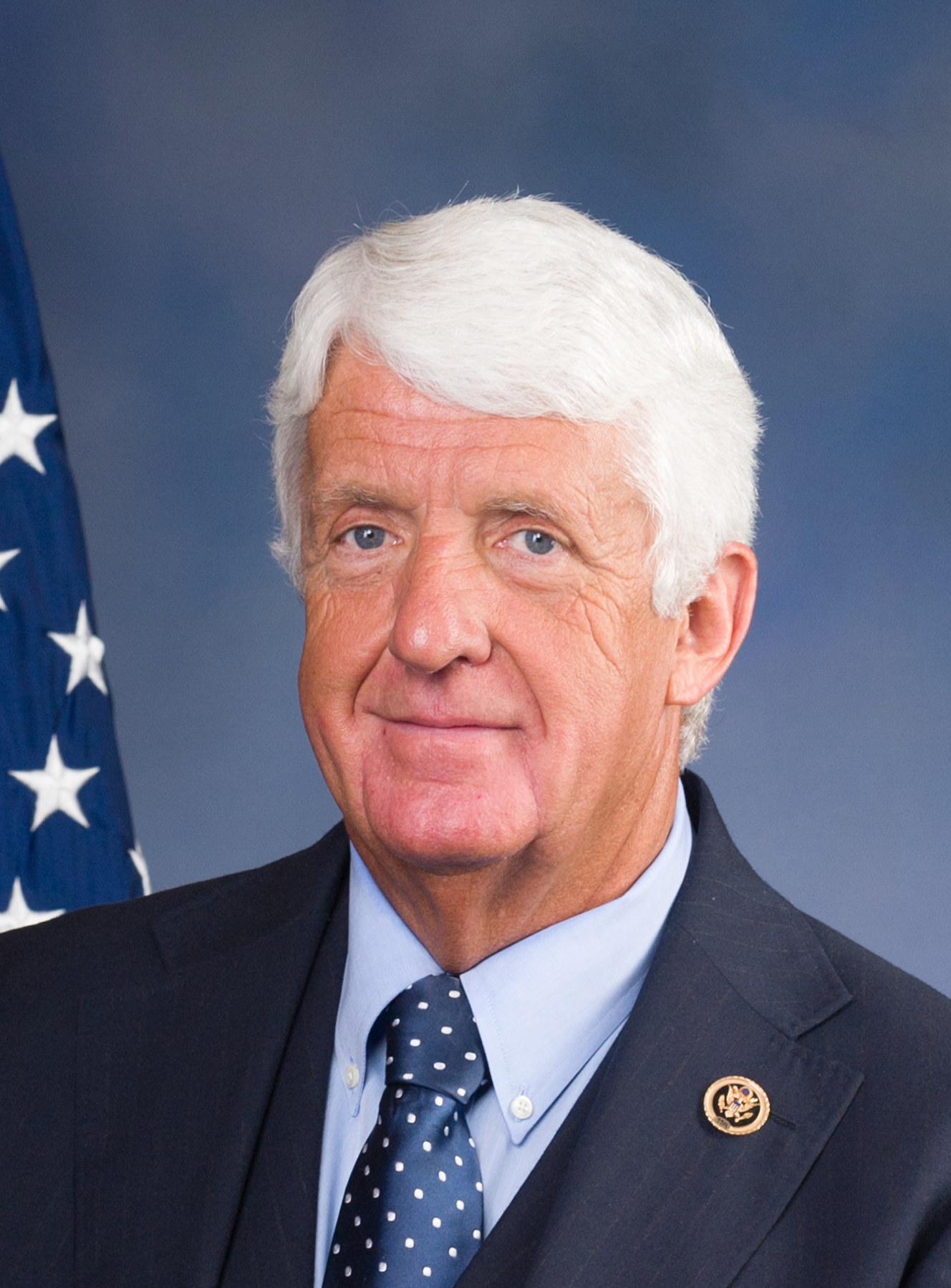

Nominee	Rob Bishop	Donna M. McAleer
Party	Republican	Democratic
Popular vote	175,487	60,611
Percentage	71.5%	24.7%
- County results Bishop: 60–70% 70–80% 80–90% McAleer: 50–60%
U.S. Representative before election
Rob Bishop
Republican
Elected U.S. Representative
Rob Bishop
Republican

Republican incumbent Rob Bishop, who had represented Utah's 1st congressional district since 2003, ran for re-election, having decided against running for governor.

=== Republican primary ===
==== Candidates ====
===== Nominee =====
- Rob Bishop, incumbent U.S. representative

===== Eliminated in primary =====
- Leonard "Joe" Fabiano, business entrepreneur and candidate for senate in 2010
- Jacqueline Smith, homemaker and Tea Party activist

===== Withdrawn =====
- Michael Miller, Iraq War veteran

==== Results ====
Rob Bishop became the official Republican candidate on April 21, 2012 at the State Republican Convention.

Republican convention, 1st round results
Party	Candidate	Votes	%
Republican	Rob Bishop	786	81.1
Republican	Jacqueline Smith	158	16.3
Republican	Leonard Fabiano	25	2.6
Total votes		969	100.0

=== Democratic primary ===
==== Candidates ====
===== Nominee =====
- Donna McAleer, management consultant and West Point graduate

===== Eliminated in primary =====
- Ryan Combe, small business owner

==== Results ====
Democratic primary results
Party	Candidate	Votes	%
Democratic	Donna McAleer	3,881	66.6
Democratic	Ryan Combe	1,944	33.4
Total votes		5,825	100.0

=== Constitution primary ===
==== Candidates ====
===== Nominee =====
- Sherry Phipps

=== General election ===
==== Polling ====
Poll source	Date(s) administered	Sample size	Margin of error	Rob Bishop (R)	Donna McAleer (D)	Sherry Phipps (C)	Undecided
Dan Jones & Associates	October 26–November 1, 2012	194 (RV)	±7.0%	70%	15%	2%	10%
Key Research/Brigham Young University	October 9–13, 2012	407 (LV)	±7.0%	62%	20%	–	18%

==== Predictions ====
Source	Ranking	As of
The Cook Political Report	Safe R	November 5, 2012
Rothenberg	Safe R	November 2, 2012
Roll Call	Safe R	November 4, 2012
Sabato's Crystal Ball	Safe R	November 5, 2012
NY Times	Safe R	November 4, 2012
RCP	Safe R	November 4, 2012
The Hill	Safe R	November 4, 2012

==== Results ====
Utah's 1st congressional district, 2012
Party	Candidate	Votes	%
Republican	Rob Bishop (incumbent)	175,487	71.5
Democratic	Donna M. McAleer	60,611	24.7
Constitution	Sherry Phipps	9,430	3.8
Total votes		245,528	100.0
Republican hold			

===== By county =====
County	Rob Bishop Republican		Donna M. McAleer Democratic		Sherry Phipps Constitution		Margin		Total
County	Votes	%	Votes	%	Votes	%	Votes	%	Total
Box Elder	15,642	81.68%	2,711	14.16%	797	4.16%	12,931	67.52%	19,150
Cache	31,518	76.29%	8,076	19.55%	1,718	4.16%	23,442	56.74%	41,312
Daggett	341	70.60%	118	24.43%	24	4.97%	223	46.17%	483
Davis	52,780	75.48%	14,523	20.77%	2,621	3.75%	38,257	54.71%	69,924
Duchesne	5,089	81.94%	796	12.82%	326	5.25%	4,293	69.12%	6,211
Morgan	3,649	81.32%	648	14.44%	190	4.23%	3,001	66.88%	4,487
Rich	828	84.58%	110	11.24%	41	4.19%	718	73.34%	979
Summit	7,391	43.28%	9,317	54.55%	371	2.17%	-1,926	-11.28%	17,079
Uintah	9,659	85.14%	1,301	11.47%	385	3.39%	8,358	73.67%	11,345
Weber	48,590	65.17%	23,011	30.86%	2,957	3.97%	25,579	34.31%	74,558

== District 2 ==
2012 Utah's 2nd congressional district election
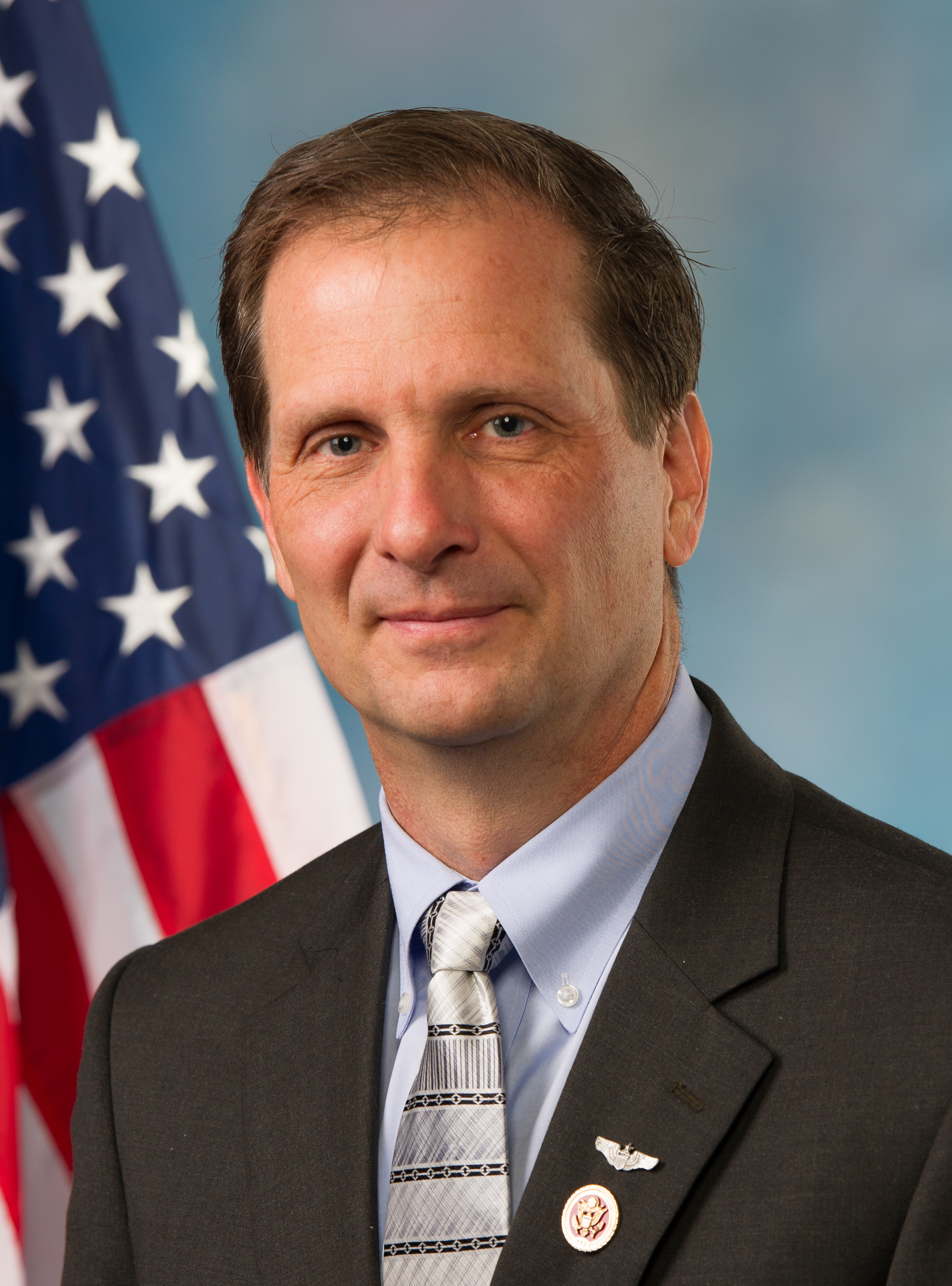

Nominee	Chris Stewart	Jay Seegmiller
Party	Republican	Democratic
Popular vote	154,523	83,176
Percentage	62.2%	33.5%
- County results Stewart: 50–60% 60–70% 70–80% 80–90% Seegmiller: 50–60%
U.S. Representative before election
Jim Matheson
Democratic
Elected U.S. Representative
Chris Stewart
Republican

Democratic incumbent Jim Matheson, who had represented Utah's 2nd congressional district since 2001, sought re-election in the new 4th district.

=== Democratic primary ===
==== Candidates ====
===== Nominee =====
- Jay Seegmiller, former state representative

===== Eliminated in primary =====
- Dean Collinwood
- Mike Small

=== Republican primary ===
==== Candidates ====
===== Nominee =====
- Chris Stewart, author, former U.S. Air Force pilot, and president of an energy consulting firm

===== Eliminated in primary =====
- Jason Buck, former American football player at Brigham Young University and in the National Football League
- Dave Clark, former speaker of the Utah House of Representatives
- Cherilyn Eagar, business owner and candidate for Senate in 2010
- Robert Fuehr, former telecommunications executive and Harvard University MBA alumnus
- Milton Hanks
- Edward Mayerhofer
- Jeramey McElhaney, small business owner
- Howard Wallack
- Chuck Williams, former assistant Deputy Under Secretary of Defense for Installations and Environment and retired U.S. Air Force lieutenant colonel
- John Willoughby, airline pilot

===== Withdrawn =====
- Morgan Philpot, former state representative and nominee for this seat in 2010

===== Declined =====
- Dan Liljenquist, state senator

==== Results ====
Republican convention, 1st round results
Party	Candidate	Votes	%
Republican	Chris Stewart	365	39.6
Republican	David Clark	234	25.0
Republican	Milton Ray Hanks	121	13.0
Republican	Howard Wallack	51	5.5
Republican	Cherilyn Eagar	48	5.2
Republican	Jason Buck	42	4.5
Republican	Bob Fuehr	24	2.6
Republican	Chuck Williams	16	1.7
Republican	Jeramey McElhaney	14	1.5
Republican	John W. Willoughby	6	0.7
Republican	Edward Mayerhofer	0	0.0
Total votes		921	100.0

Republican convention, 2nd round results
Party	Candidate	Votes	%
Republican	Chris Stewart	386	43.9
Republican	David Clark	283	32.2
Republican	Milton Ray Hanks	65	7.4
Republican	Jeramey McElhaney	63	7.2
Republican	Jason Buck	57	6.5
Republican	Bob Fuehr	25	2.8
Total votes		879	100.0

Republican convention, 3rd round results
Party	Candidate	Votes	%
Republican	Chris Stewart	511	61.6
Republican	David Clark	319	38.4
Total votes		830	100.0

=== Constitution primary ===
==== Candidates ====
===== Nominee =====
- Jonathan D. Garrard

=== Independents ===
Independent candidate Charles Kimball also filed.

=== General election ===
==== Endorsements ====
Jay Seegmiller (D)

Organizations

- Sierra Club
Chris Stewart (R)

Organizations

- National Republican Congressional Committee "Young Guns" Program

==== Polling ====
Poll source	Date(s) administered	Sample size	Margin of error	Jay Seegmiller (D)	Chris Stewart (R)	Other	Undecided
Dan Jones & Associates	October 26–November 1, 2012	229 (RV)	±6.5%	28%	44%	5%	22%
Mason-Dixon/Salt Lake Tribune	October 29–31, 2012	625 (LV)	±4.0%	28%	55%	5%	12%
Key Research/Brigham Young University	October 9–13, 2012	100 (LV)	±10.0%	20%	46%	–	34%

==== Predictions ====
Source	Ranking	As of
The Cook Political Report	Safe R (flip)	November 5, 2012
Rothenberg	Safe R (flip)	November 2, 2012
Roll Call	Safe R (flip)	November 4, 2012
Sabato's Crystal Ball	Safe R (flip)	November 5, 2012
NY Times	Safe R (flip)	November 4, 2012
RCP	Safe R (flip)	November 4, 2012
The Hill	Safe R (flip)	November 4, 2012

==== Results ====
Utah's 2nd congressional district, 2012
Party	Candidate	Votes	%
Republican	Chris Stewart	154,523	62.2
Democratic	Jay Seegmiller	83,176	33.5
Constitution	Jonathan D. Garrard	5,051	2.0
Independent	Joseph Andrade	2,971	1.2
Independent	Charles E. Kimball	2,824	1.1
Total votes		248,545	100.0
Republican gain from Democratic			

===== By county =====
County	Chris Stewart Republican		Jay Seegmiller Democratic		Jonathan D. Garrard Constitution		Joseph Andrade Independent		Charles E. Kimball Independent		Margin		Total
County	Votes	%	Votes	%	Votes	%	Votes	%	Votes	%	Votes	%	Total
Beaver	1,926	77.69%	465	18.76%	50	2.02%	13	0.52%	25	1.01%	1,461	58.94%	2,479
Davis	36,133	74.15%	11,109	22.80%	753	1.55%	288	0.59%	445	0.91%	25,024	51.35%	48,728
Garfield	1,666	79.56%	343	16.38%	46	2.20%	15	0.72%	24	1.15%	1,323	63.18%	2,094
Iron	12,695	78.01%	2,737	16.82%	476	2.92%	134	0.82%	232	1.43%	9,958	61.19%	16,274
Juab	181	52.31%	149	43.06%	9	2.60%	3	0.87%	4	1.16%	32	9.25%	346
Kane	2,293	70.73%	802	24.74%	61	1.88%	38	1.17%	48	1.48%	1,491	45.99%	3,242
Millard	4,001	80.91%	659	13.33%	157	3.17%	46	0.93%	82	1.66%	3,342	67.58%	4,945
Piute	636	85.14%	76	10.17%	16	2.14%	8	1.07%	11	1.47%	560	74.97%	747
Salt Lake	30,297	36.06%	49,205	58.57%	1,412	1.68%	1,970	2.34%	1,127	1.34%	-18,908	-22.51%	84,011
Sanpete	4,307	84.09%	611	11.93%	120	2.34%	20	0.39%	64	1.25%	3,696	72.16%	5,122
Sevier	6,551	83.18%	1,023	12.99%	137	1.74%	49	0.62%	116	1.47%	5,528	70.19%	7,876
Tooele	12,423	66.64%	5,064	27.16%	800	4.29%	120	0.64%	236	1.27%	4,772	51.63%	18,643
Washington	40,401	76.59%	10,700	20.28%	1,006	1.91%	253	0.48%	392	0.74%	29,701	56.30%	52,752
Wayne	1,013	78.77%	233	18.12%	8	0.62%	14	1.09%	18	1.40%	780	60.65%	1,286

== District 3 ==
2012 Utah's 3rd congressional district election
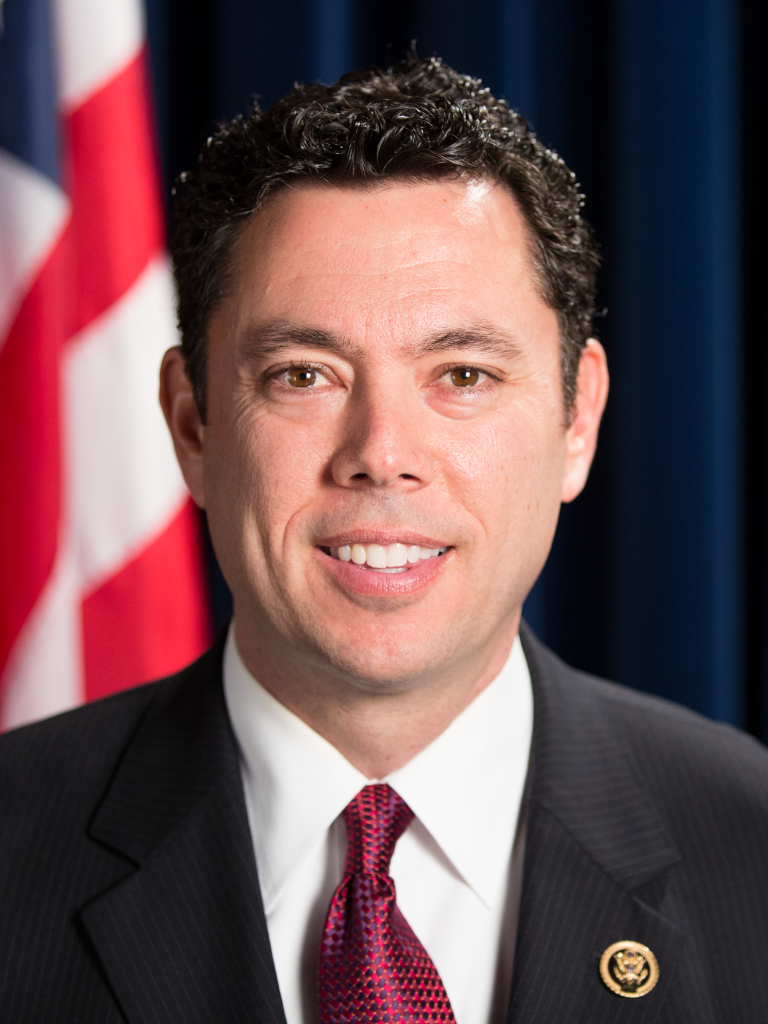

Nominee	Jason Chaffetz	Soren D. Simonsen
Party	Republican	Democratic
Popular vote	198,828	60,719
Percentage	76.6%	23.4%
- County results Chaffetz: 50–60% 60–70% 70–80% 80–90%
U.S. Representative before election
Jason Chaffetz
Republican
Elected U.S. Representative
Jason Chaffetz
Republican

Jason Chaffetz was seeking a third term in representing Utah's 3rd congressional district.

=== Republican primary ===
==== Candidates ====
===== Nominee =====
- Jason Chaffetz, incumbent U.S. representative

===== Eliminated in primary =====
- Brian Jenkins
- Lynn D. Wardle

===== Withdrawn =====
- Kurt Bradburn
- Leonard "Joe" Fabiano, business entrepreneur and candidate for senate in 2010

==== Results ====
Republican convention, 1st round results
Party	Candidate	Votes	%
Republican	Jason Chaffetz	710	75.0
Republican	Lynn D. Wardle	208	22.0
Republican	Brian Jenkins	29	3.0
Total votes		947	100.0

=== Democratic primary ===
==== Candidates ====
===== Nominee =====
- Soren Simonsen, Salt Lake City Council chair

===== Eliminated in primary =====
- Richard Clark

=== General election ===
==== Endorsements ====
Soren Simonsen (D)

Organizations

- Equality Utah

==== Polling ====
Poll source	Date(s) administered	Sample size	Margin of error	Jason Chaffetz (R)	Soren Simonsen (D)	Other	Undecided
Dan Jones & Associates	October 26–November 1, 2012	232	±6.4%	68%	18%	3%	10%
Key Research/Brigham Young University	October 9–13, 2012	100 (LV)	±4.4%	68%	15%	—	17%

==== Predictions ====
Source	Ranking	As of
The Cook Political Report	Safe R	November 5, 2012
Rothenberg	Safe R	November 2, 2012
Roll Call	Safe R	November 4, 2012
Sabato's Crystal Ball	Safe R	November 5, 2012
NY Times	Safe R	November 4, 2012
RCP	Safe R	November 4, 2012
The Hill	Safe R	November 4, 2012

==== Results ====
Utah's 3rd congressional district, 2012
Party	Candidate	Votes	%
Republican	Jason Chaffetz	198,828	76.6
Democratic	Soren D. Simonsen	60,719	23.4
Total votes		259,547	100.0
Republican hold			

===== By county =====
County	Jason Chaffetz Republican		Soren D. Simonsen Democratic		Margin		Total
County	Votes	%	Votes	%	Votes	%	Total
Carbon	4,582	62.51%	2,748	37.49%	1,834	25.02%	7,330
Emery	3,436	80.47%	834	19.53%	2,602	60.94%	4,270
Grand	1,919	50.70%	1,866	49.30%	53	1.40%	3,785
Salt Lake	52,312	62.78%	31,008	37.22%	21,304	25.57%	83,320
San Juan	3,101	59.50%	2,111	40.50%	990	18.99%	5,212
Utah	126,643	86.57%	19,649	13.43%	106,994	73.14%	146,292
Wasatch	6,835	73.20%	2,503	26.80%	4,332	46.39%	9,338

== District 4 ==
2012 Utah's 4th congressional district election
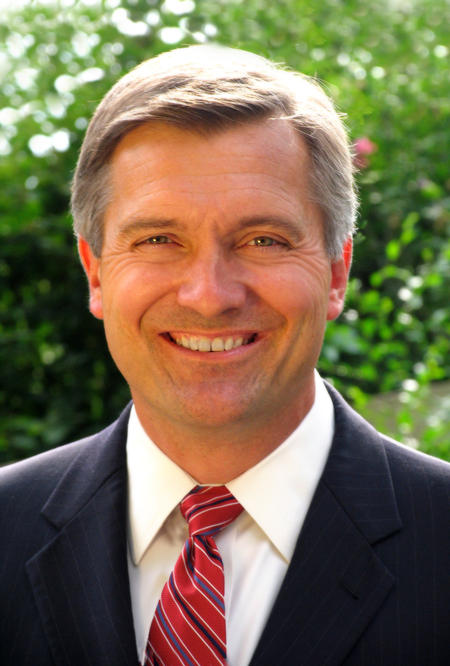

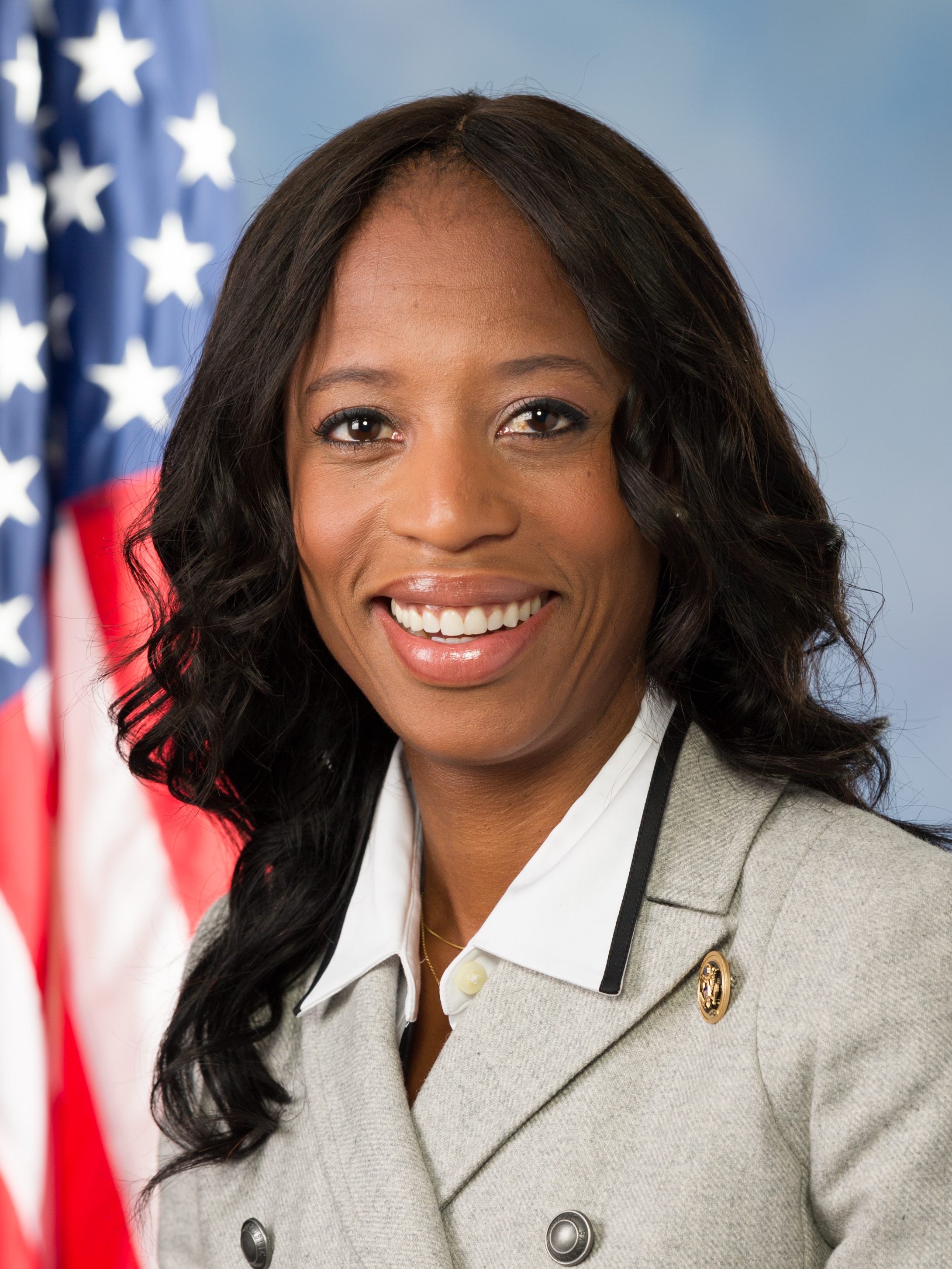
Nominee	Jim Matheson	Mia Love
Party	Democratic	Republican
Popular vote	119,803	119,035
Percentage	48.8%	48.5%
- County results Love: 60–70% 70–80% Matheson: 50–60%
U.S. Representative before election
Jim Matheson
Democratic
Elected U.S. Representative
Jim Matheson
Democratic

Democratic U.S. Representative Jim Matheson, who had represented Utah's 2nd congressional district since 2001 and had considered running for governor or for the U.S. Senate, sought re-election to the House in Utah's new 4th congressional district after his previous seat was split up by the redistricting.

=== Democratic primary ===
==== Candidates ====
===== Nominee =====
- Jim Matheson, incumbent U.S. representative for the 2nd district

=== Republican primary ===
==== Candidates ====
===== Nominee =====
- Mia Love, mayor of Saratoga Springs

===== Eliminated in primary =====
- Jay Cobb, attorney
- Kenneth Gray
- Stephen Sandstrom, state representative
- Carl Wimmer, state representative

===== Declined =====
- Jason Buck, former American football player at Brigham Young University and National Football League

==== Polling ====
Poll source	Date(s) administered	Sample size	Margin of error	Jay Cobb	Mia Love	Stephen Sandstrom	Carl Wimmer	Other	Undecided
Mason-Dixon	April 9–11, 2011	625 (LV)	± 4.0%	—	23%	14%	35%	28%	—
Dan Jones & Associates	December 19–21, 2011	341 (RV)	± 5.3%	3%	8%	15%	15%	19%	41%

==== Results ====
In the Republican convention, held on April 21, 2012, Love received 70.4% of the vote (she needed more than 60% to avoid a primary).

Republican convention, 1st round results
Party	Candidate	Votes	%
Republican	Mia Love	442	53.1
Republican	Carl Wimmer	256	30.8
Republican	Steve Sandstrom	81	9.7
Republican	Jay Cobb	52	6.3
Republican	Kenneth Gray	1	0.1
Total votes		863	100.0

Republican convention, 2nd round results
Party	Candidate	Votes	%
Republican	Mia Love	551	70.5
Republican	Carl Wimmer	231	29.5
Total votes		782	100.0

=== Libertarian primary ===
==== Candidates ====
===== Nominee =====
- Jim Vein

===== Withdrawn =====
- Ken Larsen, medical researcher

=== Justice primary ===
==== Candidates ====
===== Withdrawn =====
- Torin Nelson

==== Campaign ====
Despite beginning her campaign at a significant name-recognition disadvantage to Matheson, Love was able to mount a strong challenge. This was in part fueled by a prime-time speaking slot at the Republican National Convention, where she impressed many with her backstory of a being the daughter of Haitian immigrants whose parents "Immigrated to the U.S. with $10 in their pocket" and her themes of self-reliance, small government and fiscal responsibility. However, she was later hit by claims that she was technically an "anchor baby", despite having seemingly backing the deportation of the US-born children of illegal immigrants.

Facing a district largely new to him, Matheson ran ads showcasing his independent credentials and airing clips of Love voicing support for cutting the Department of Education and privatizing Social Security. Despite the NRCC running ads trying to tie him to Nancy Pelosi and Barack Obama, Matheson's favorability rating remained at around 60% throughout the campaign.

==== Endorsements ====
Jim Matheson (D)

Organizations

- Blue Dog Coalition
- Democratic Congressional Campaign Committee "Frontline" Program
Mia Love (R)

Organizations

- Maggie's List
- National Republican Congressional Committee "Young Guns" Program
- Susan B. Anthony List

===== Polling =====
Poll source	Date(s) administered	Sample size	Margin of error	Jim Matheson (D)	Mia Love (R)	Jim Vein (L)	Undecided
Dan Jones & Associates	October 26–November 1, 2012	414 (RV)	±4.8%	43%	48%	3%	6%
Mason-Dixon/Salt Lake Tribune	October 29–31, 2012	625 (LV)	±4.0%	40%	52%	2%	6%
Key Research/Brigham Young University	October 9–13, 2012	407 (LV)	±7.0%	43%	43%	—	14%
Global Strategy (D)	October 9–10, 2012	407 (LV)	±4.9%	48%	41%	—	11%
Dan Jones & Associates	September 26–29, 2012	414 (RV)	±5.0%	43%	49%	—	8%
Public Opinion Strategies (R-Love)/NRCC)	September 10–11, 2012	400 (LV)	±4.9%	36%	51%	—	13%
Global Strategy (D)	July 26–29, 2012	400 (LV)	±4.9%	51%	33%	—	16%
Dan Jones & Associates	June 15–21, 2012	379 (RV)	±5.1%	53%	38%	1%	8%
Mason-Dixon/Salt Lake Tribune	April 9–11, 2012	625 (LV)	±4.0%	45%	42%	—	13%
Dan Jones & Associates	December 19–21, 2011	341 (RV)	±5.3%	53%	36%	4%	12%

An early poll published by the Deseret News on Dec 25, 2011 showed Jim Matheson leading all potential opponents.

Hypothetical polling

====== With Cobb ======
Poll source	Date(s) administered	Sample size	Margin of error	Jim Matheson (D)	Jay Cobb (R)	Undecided
Dan Jones & Associates	December 19–21, 2011	341 (RV)	±5.3%	54%	35%	11%

====== With Sandstrom ======
Poll source	Date(s) administered	Sample size	Margin of error	Jim Matheson (D)	Stephen Sandstrom (R)	Undecided
Mason-Dixon	April 9–11, 2012	625 (LV)	±4.0%	45%	42%	13%
Dan Jones & Associates	December 19–21, 2011	341 (RV)	±5.3%	50%	41%	10%

====== With Wimmer ======
Poll source	Date(s) administered	Sample size	Margin of error	Jim Matheson (D)	Carl Wimmer (R)	Undecided
Mason-Dixon	April 9–11, 2012	625 (LV)	±4.0%	46%	45%	9%
Dan Jones & Associates	December 19–21, 2011	341 (RV)	±5.3%	52%	41%	7%

==== Predictions ====
Source	Ranking	As of
The Cook Political Report	Lean R (flip)	November 5, 2012
Rothenberg	Tilt R (flip)	November 2, 2012
Roll Call	Lean R (flip)	November 4, 2012
Sabato's Crystal Ball	Lean R (flip)	November 5, 2012
NY Times	Tossup	November 4, 2012
RCP	Tossup	November 4, 2012
The Hill	Tossup	November 4, 2012

==== Results ====
Matheson narrowly defeated Love in the general election by only 768 votes. If Love had won the seat, she would have become the first African-American Republican woman to sit in the House.

Utah's 4th congressional district, 2012
Party	Candidate	Votes	%
Democratic	Jim Matheson (incumbent)	119,803	48.8
Republican	Mia Love	119,035	48.5
Libertarian	Jim L. Vein	6,439	2.6
Total votes		245,277	100.0
Democratic win (new seat)			

===== By county =====
County	Jim Matheson Democratic		Mia Love Republican		Jim L. Vein Libertarian		Margin		Total
County	Votes	%	Votes	%	Votes	%	Votes	%	Total
Juab	1,253	34.80%	2,241	62.23%	107	2.97%	-988	-27.44%	3,601
Salt Lake	109,599	52.32%	94,236	44.99%	5,626	2.69%	15,363	7.33%	209,461
Sanpete	1,316	30.91%	2,826	66.38%	115	2.70%	-1,510	-35.47%	4,257
Utah	7,635	27.31%	19,732	70.58%	591	2.11%	-12,097	-43.27%	27,958

Official campaign websites
- District 1
  - Michael Miller campaign website
  - Jacqueline Smith campaign website
- District 2
  - Jay Seegmiller campaign website
  - Dean Collinwood campaign website
  - Jason Buck campaign website
  - Cherilyn Eagar campaign website
  - Chris Stewart campaign website
  - Howard Wallack campaign website
  - Chuck Williams campaign website
  - Charles Kimball campaign website
  - Bob Fuehr campaign website
- District 3
  - Jason Chaffetz campaign website
  - Soren Simonsen campaign website
- District 4
  - Jay Cobb campaign website
  - Mia Love campaign website
  - Jim Matheson campaign website
  - Stephen Sandstrom campaign website
  - Carl Wimmer campaign website
