= 2006 United States House of Representatives elections in Utah =

- November 7, 2006

All 3 Utah seats to the United States House of Representatives
	Majority party	Minority party
Party	Republican	Democratic
Last election	2	1
Seats won	2	1
Seat change	Steady	Steady
Popular vote	292,235	244,483
Percentage	51.30%	42.92%
Swing	▼5.96pp	▲3.13pp

Republican
50–60%
60–70%
70–80%
80–90%
Democratic
40–50%
50–60%
60–70%
70–80%

The Utah congressional elections of 2006 were held on November 7, 2006, as part of the United States general elections of 2006 with all three House seats up for election. The winners served from January 3, 2007, to January 3, 2009.

== Overview ==
United States House of Representatives elections in Utah, 2006
Party	Votes	Percentage	Seats	+/–
Republican	292,235	51.30%	2	—
Democratic	244,483	42.92%	1	—
Constitution	23,467	4.12%	0	—
Libertarian	6,167	1.08%	0	—
Green	3,338	0.59%	0	—
Totals	569,690	100.00%	3	—

== District 1 ==
2006 Utah's 1st congressional district election

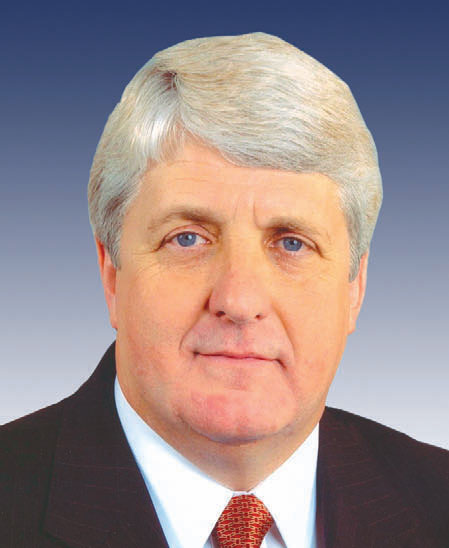

Nominee	Rob Bishop	Steven Olsen
Party	Republican	Democratic
Popular vote	156,692	57,922
Percentage	63.06%	32.45%
- County results Bishop: 50–60% 60–70% 70–80% 80–90% Olsen: 50–60% 60–70%
U.S. Representative before election
Rob Bishop
Republican
Elected U.S. Representative
Rob Bishop
Republican

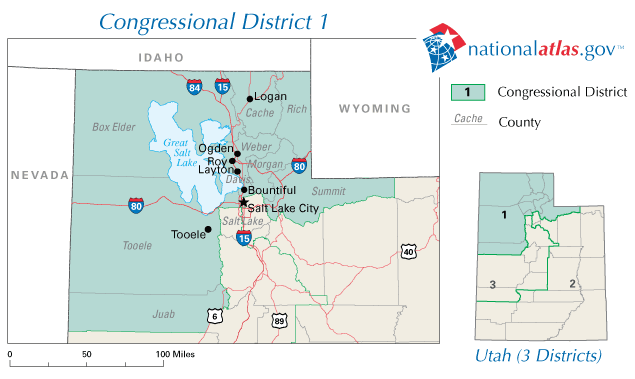

Incumbent Republican Congressman Rob Bishop won re-election to a third term over Democratic nominee Steven Olsen, Constitution Party nominee Mark Hudson, and Libertarian nominee Lynn Badler.

=== Predictions ===
Source	Ranking	As of
The Cook Political Report	Safe R	November 6, 2006
Rothenberg	Safe R	November 6, 2006
Sabato's Crystal Ball	Safe R	November 6, 2006
Real Clear Politics	Safe R	November 7, 2006
CQ Politics	Safe R	November 7, 2006

Utah's 1st congressional district election, 2006
Party	Candidate	Votes	%
Republican	Rob Bishop (incumbent)	112,546	63.06%
Democratic	Steven Olsen	57,922	32.45%
Constitution	Mark Hudson	5,539	3.10%
Libertarian	Lynn Badler	2,467	1.39%
Total votes		178,474	100.00%
Republican hold			

== District 2 ==
2006 Utah's 2nd congressional district election

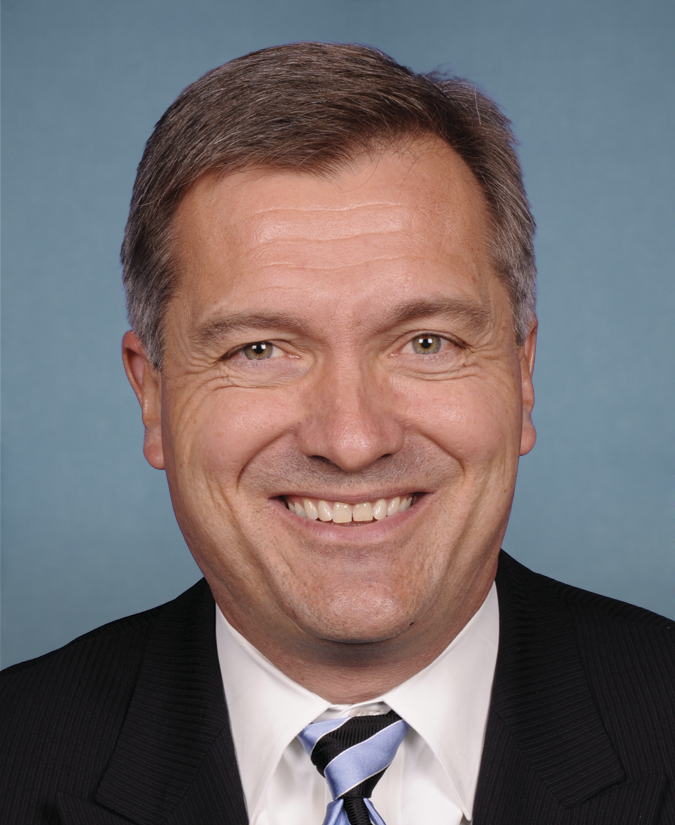

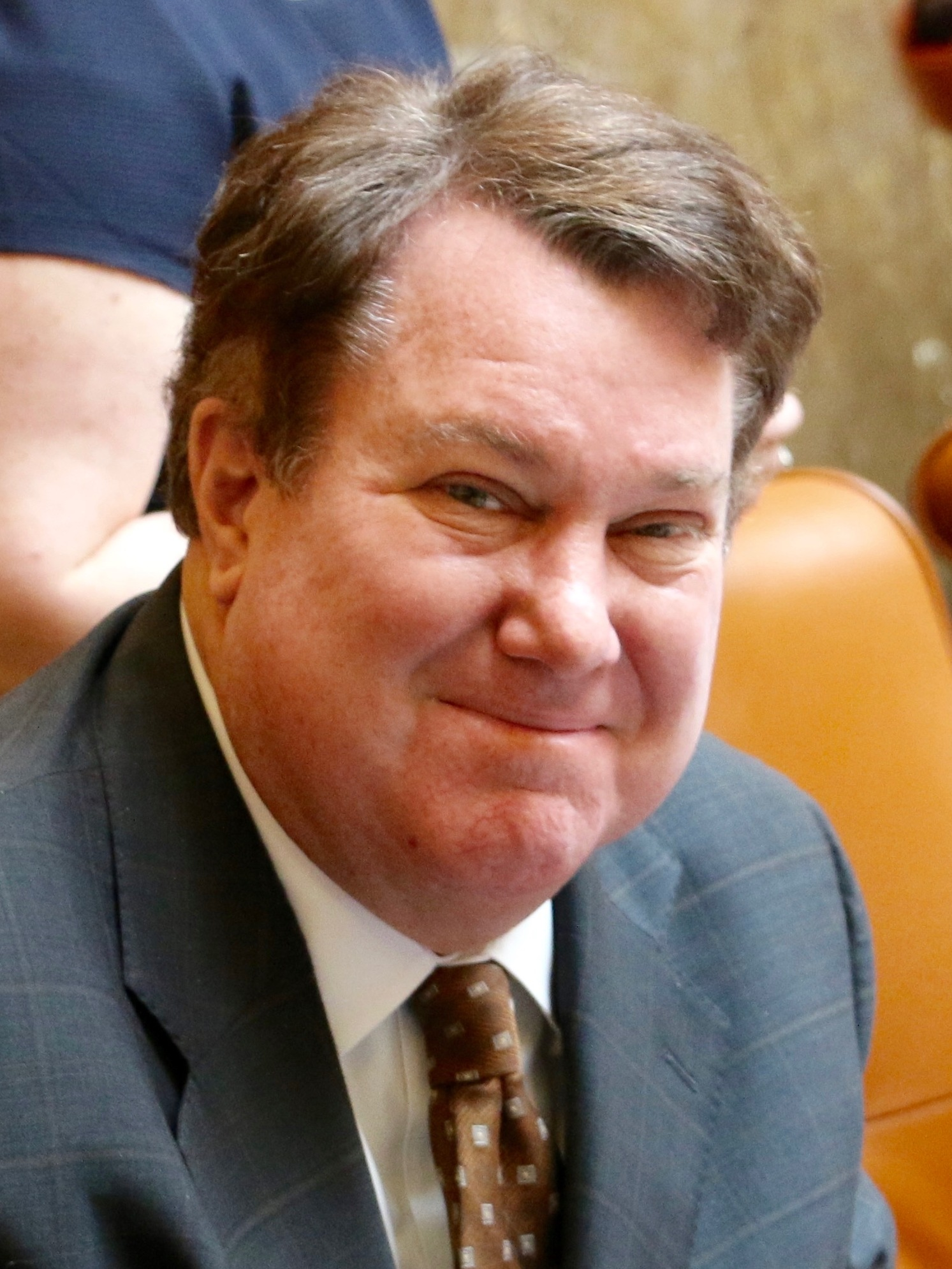
Nominee	Jim Matheson	LaVar Christensen
Party	Democratic	Republican
Popular vote	133,231	84,234
Percentage	59.00%	37.30%
- County results Matheson: 40–50% 50–60% 60–70% 70–80% Christensen: 50–60%
U.S. Representative before election
Jim Matheson
Democratic
Elected U.S. Representative
Jim Matheson
Democratic

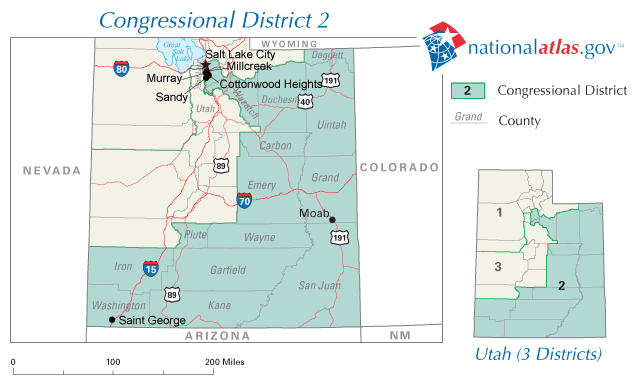

Although incumbent Jim Matheson (D) won re-election in 2004 by a margin of 13%, his district is in a heavily Republican state. The district includes the most Democratic areas in Utah, such as the liberal communities of Grand County, the large Greek communities of Carbon County, the Navajos of San Juan County, and heavily Democratic Salt Lake City. Matheson is a regular target of the GOP every election. State Representative LaVar Christensen (R) of Draper, a small affluent suburb of Salt Lake City, ran as the Republican nominee in the district. For example, Christensen was one of two major sponsors of a bill that amended Utah's Constitution to ban same-sex marriage. The amendment was rejected by two-thirds of Summit County, half of Grand County, and only passed by 4% in Salt Lake County, while the state as a whole averaged 66%, with the most supportive areas to banning such marriages being located in the first and third districts, not the second. Matheson had approval ratings in the high 70s, the highest for any elected official in Utah.

=== Predictions ===
Source	Ranking	As of
The Cook Political Report	Likely D	November 6, 2006
Rothenberg	Safe D	November 6, 2006
Sabato's Crystal Ball	Safe D	November 6, 2006
Real Clear Politics	Safe D	November 7, 2006
CQ Politics	Likely D	November 7, 2006

Utah's 2nd congressional district election, 2006
Party	Candidate	Votes	%
Democratic	Jim Matheson (incumbent)	133,231	59.00
Republican	LaVar Christensen	84,234	37.30
Constitution	W. David Perry	3,395	1.50
Green	Bob Brister	3,338	1.48
Libertarian	Austin Sherwood Lett	1,620	0.72
Total votes		225,818	100.00
Democratic hold			

== District 3 ==
2006 Utah's 3rd congressional district election

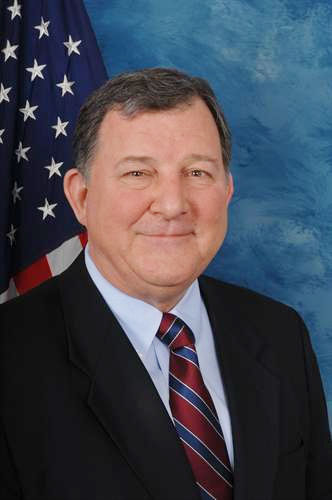

Nominee	Chris Cannon	Christian Burridge
Party	Republican	Democratic
Popular vote	95,455	53,330
Percentage	57.71%	32.24%
- County results Cannon: 50–60% 60–70% 70–80%
U.S. Representative before election
Chris Cannon
Republican
Elected U.S. Representative
Chris Cannon
Republican

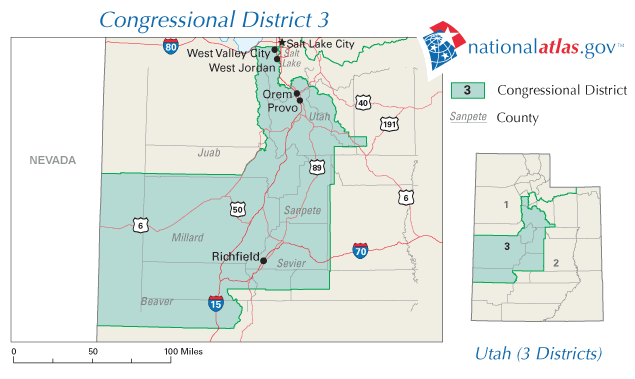

Congressman Chris Cannon (R) had represented this district for ten years, but found himself in a competitive primary, just as he had in 2004. In a campaign that focused almost exclusively on the immigration issue, Businessman John Jacob repeatedly attacked Cannon for his support for a guest worker program. In May 2006, at the state GOP convention, Jacob surprised Cannon by winning 52 percent of the delegate ballots. "Cannon’s 48 percent showing was especially poor, given that the ballots were cast mainly by the party insiders who dominate such conventions.". The Republican primary was held on June 27, 2006. While polls showed a close race, in the June Republican primary, Cannon received 32,306 votes (55.8%) and Jacob received 25,589 votes (44.2%).

=== Predictions ===
Source	Ranking	As of
The Cook Political Report	Safe R	November 6, 2006
Rothenberg	Safe R	November 6, 2006
Sabato's Crystal Ball	Safe R	November 6, 2006
Real Clear Politics	Safe R	November 7, 2006
CQ Politics	Safe R	November 7, 2006

Utah's 3rd congressional district election, 2006
Party	Candidate	Votes	%
Republican	Chris Cannon (incumbent)	95,455	57.71
Democratic	Christian Burridge	53,330	32.24
Constitution	Jim Noorlander	14,533	8.79
Libertarian	Philip Lear Hallman	2,080	1.26
Total votes		165,398	100.00
Republican hold			

== See also ==
- United States House of Representatives elections, 2006
