= Ensuring Public Involvement in the Creation of National Monuments Act =

Proposed US legislative amendment

- Long title: To ensure that the National Environmental Policy Act of 1969 applies to the declaration of national monuments, and for other purposes.
- Announced in: the 113th United States Congress
- Sponsored by: Rep. Rob Bishop (R, UT-1)
- Number of co-sponsors: 7

Codification
- Acts affected: National Environmental Policy Act of 1969, Antiquities Act of 1906
- U.S.C. sections affected: 42 U.S.C. § 4321 et seq., 16 U.S.C. § 431
- Agencies affected: United States Department of the Interior

Legislative history
- Introduced in the House as H.R. 1459 by Rep. Rob Bishop (R, UT-1) on April 10, 2013; Committee consideration by United States House Committee on Natural Resources, United States House Natural Resources Subcommittee on Public Lands and Environmental Regulation

The Ensuring Public Involvement in the Creation of National Monuments Act (H.R. 1459) would amend the Antiquities Act of 1906 to subject national monument declarations by the President to the National Environmental Policy Act of 1969 (NEPA). At present, the President of the United States can unilaterally declare something a national monument, whereas the United States Congress is required to follow a more rigorous series of procedures to gather input from the public. When something is called a "National Monument," that means no action from Congress was required, while something designated a "National Park" did require Congressional action. In addition to limiting the number of national monument declarations the president could make, the bill would forbid the government from declaring land belonging to a private owner as a national monument without the private owner's consent.

The bill was introduced in the United States House of Representatives during the 113th United States Congress.

== Background ==
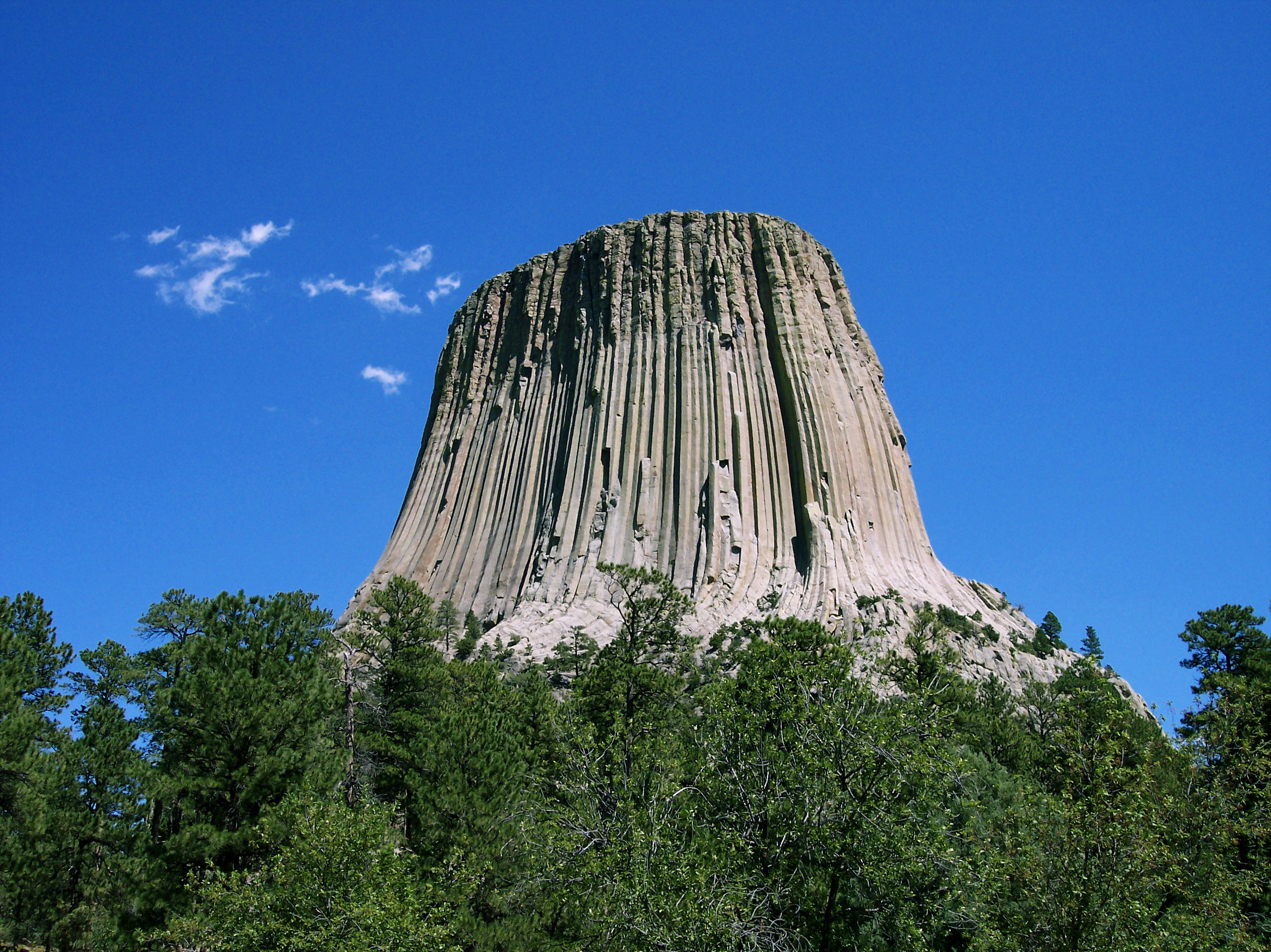
Devils Tower National Monument, Wyoming

President Theodore Roosevelt established the first national monument, Devils Tower in Wyoming, on September 24, 1906. There are over 100 National Monuments in the United States.

Presidential use of the Antiquities Act to declare a National Monument:

- President Bill Clinton used the law to expand 3 monuments and start 19
- President George W. Bush used the law to create five monuments
- President Barack Obama has used the act ten times as of March 24, 2014

== Provisions of the bill ==
This summary is based largely on the summary provided by the Congressional Research Service, a public domain source.

The Ensuring Public Involvement in the Creation of National Monuments Act would amend the Antiquities Act of 1906 to subject national monument declarations by the President to the National Environmental Policy Act of 1969 (NEPA).

The bill would prohibit: (1) the President from making more than one such declaration in a state during any presidential four-year term of office without an express Act of Congress, or (2) such a declaration from including private property without the informed written consent of the affected private property owner.

The bill would require such a declaration: (1) to be considered a major federal action under NEPA if it affects more than 5,000 acres; (2) to be categorically excluded under NEPA and to expire three years after the date of the declaration (unless specifically designated as a monument by federal law) if it affects 5,000 acres or less; and (3) to be followed by a feasibility study that includes an estimate of the costs associated with managing the monument in perpetuity, including any loss of federal and state revenue.

== Congressional Budget Office report ==
This summary is based largely on the summary provided by the Congressional Budget Office, as ordered reported by the House Committee on Natural Resources on July 24, 2013. This is a public domain source.

H.R. 1459 would amend the process of designating new national monuments. The Antiquities Act of 1906 authorizes the President to declare landmarks, structures, and other objects of historic or scientific interest that are on federal land to be national monuments. H.R. 1459 would require an environmental review of any potential monuments that are greater than 5,000 acres. The designation of a national monument would expire after three years for any monument less than 5,000 acres unless the monument was designated by a change in the law. Under the bill, every designation would be followed by a feasibility study of the costs of managing the monument. The legislation also would limit the number of designations the President could make to one per state during a four-year term.

Based on information provided by the National Park Service, the Congressional Budget Office (CBO) estimates that implementing H.R. 1459 would cost about $2 million over the 2014-2018 period. Over the past 10 years, 16 national monuments have been established. The CBO estimates that the additional studies required under the legislation would increase the cost of designating a new monument by about $300,000. Enacting H.R. 1459 would not affect direct spending or revenues; therefore, pay-as-you-go procedures do not apply.

H.R. 1459 contains no intergovernmental or private-sector mandates as defined in the Unfunded Mandates Reform Act and would impose no costs on state, local, or tribal governments.

== Procedural history ==
The Ensuring Public Involvement in the Creation of National Monuments Act was introduced into the United States House of Representatives on April 10, 2013, by Rep. Rob Bishop (R, UT-1). It was referred to the United States House Committee on Natural Resources and the United States House Natural Resources Subcommittee on Public Lands and Environmental Regulation. It was reported by the committee alongside House Report 113-221 on September 20, 2013. On March 21, 2014, it was announced that the bill was scheduled to be considered on March 26 or 27, 2014.

== Debate and discussion ==
The sponsor of the bill, Rep. Rob Bishop (R-UT), argued that "the American people deserve the opportunity to participate in land-use decisions regardless of whether they are made in Congress or by the President." His new bill, he insists, would ensure "that new national monuments are created openly with consideration of public input."

Supporters are reacting to President Barack Obama's actions to expand the California Coastal National Monument, something he did after the House had passed legislation, the California Coastal National Monument Expansion Act of 2013, to the same effect on July 22, 2013.

Opponents of the bill, such as the Center for American Progress argue that the President's power to declare national monuments without lengthy review is needed because Congress is too slow at pass land conservation bills. According to senior-fellow Matt Lee-Ashley, "there is a widening gap between American families who want more parks and open spaces to get outdoors and a Congress that slashed conservation budgets, shuttered parks and blocked nearly every community-led effort to protect lands for future generations," all of which requires the President to be able to take more immediate action.

Opponents point to a set of 10 land conservation bills that have been reintroduced in Congress after Congress without becoming law, collectively introduced 52 times in 30 years.

=== Media reaction ===
Several media outlets, including MSNBC and the International Business Times, incorrectly reported that the bill would limit a president to only one newly declared national monument per four-year term. In fact, the bill says in Section 2(a)(3) that the limit is that "no more than one declaration shall be made in a State during any presidential four-year term of office without an express Act of Congress." The Congressional Research Service concurs, saying in its summary that the bill would prohibit "the President from making more than one such declaration in a state during any presidential four-year term of office" (emphasis added).

== See also ==
- List of bills in the 113th United States Congress
- List of national monuments of the United States
- National monument (United States)
