= Joseph A. Cannon =

American politician and businessman

- Born: Joseph Angus Cannon; July 31, 1949 (age 77)
- Education: Brigham Young University (BA, JD)
- Organization: Geneva Steel Company
- Political party: Republican
- Spouse: Jan Barney
- Children: 7 children
- Relatives: Chris Cannon (brother)
- Family: Cannon Family

Joseph Angus Cannon (July 31, 1949) is a businessman with interests in steel and energy, and active in the Utah Republican Party. He was chairman of the Utah Republican Party from 2002 to 2006. Along with his brother, Chris Cannon, he operated Geneva Steel in Utah County, Utah from 1987 to its closure in 2001–2002.

As recently as 2018, he was listed as the CEO of the Fuel Freedom Foundation. Cannon was a candidate for the U.S. Senate in 1992 (defeated by former Senator Bob Bennett). He served as an assistant administrator of the U.S. Environmental Protection Agency (EPA) from 1983 to 1985.

== Early life ==
Cannon was born on July 31, 1949. Cannon served as a missionary for the Church of Jesus Christ of Latter-day Saints (LDS Church) in Ireland as well as on the Isle of Man, the ancestral homeland of the Cannons. Cannon received degrees in political science and law from Brigham Young University.

== Career ==
=== Law clerk ===
Cannon served as a law clerk in Salt Lake City for U.S. District Judge Aldon J. Anderson.

=== Geneva Steel company ===
Cannon played a pivotal role in the purchase of Geneva Steel from U.S. Steel in 1987. After that transaction, he became chairman of Geneva Steel. The company twice filed for bankruptcy, most recently in 2002, when Geneva Steel closed.

The equipment was sold, but the steel plant in operation at one site since 1942 leaves other assets to sell and issues to settle. The Geneva Steel site will require up to $42 million in environmental remediation efforts, as the soil and water of the site are heavily polluted.

=== Political and government activity ===
Cannon was a candidate for the U.S. Senate in 1992 (defeated by former Senator Bob Bennett). He served as an assistant administrator of the EPA, Office of Air and Radiation, from 1983 to 1985.

He was chairman of the Utah Republican Party from 2002 to 2006.

As recently as 2018 he was listed as the CEO of the Fuel Freedom Foundation.

=== Deseret News ===
He was named editor of the Deseret Morning News on December 8, 2006, serving from 2007 until 2010

== Personal life ==
Cannon is part of the well-known, politically involved Cannon family of Utah. He is the grandson and great-grandson of Utah Congressmen, and cousin of other Utah Congressmen. His brother, Chris Cannon, was a Congressman from 1997 until 2009.

Cannon married Jan Barney, and they are the parents of seven children.

Among other positions in the LDS Church, Cannon has served as president of the BYU 6th Stake.

== See also ==
- Geneva Steel
