= Bennion Spencer =

American journalist and politician

- Born: October 26, 1952 (age 73); Layton, Utah
- Education: Weber State University, Utah State University
- Occupation: Journalist
- Known for: Candidate for Utah State Senate and U.S. Congress
- Political party: Democratic
- Spouse: Malinda Spencer
- Children: 4
- Website: 2008 campaign website

Bennion Lloyd Spencer (born October 26, 1952) is a journalist and professor, and was the 2008 Democratic candidate for Utah's 3rd congressional district running against Republican Jason Chaffetz.

== Biographical background ==
A native of Layton, Utah, Spencer served a two-year mission for the LDS Church in England and Wales. In 1976, he received a Bachelor's degree in Broadcast Communications from Weber State College. After five years as a reporter, he completed a Master of Science in International Relations from Utah State University in 1985.

Spencer spent 25 years as a journalist in both Texas and Utah. In Salt Lake City, he was a television news reporter at KTVX, from 1980-1985. He then became news producer at KSL-TV from 1985-1996. Moving to Beaumont, Texas, he was TV news director at KBMT from 1996-1998.

Spencer now resides in Riverton, Utah.

Spencer has also been an instructor at Salt Lake Community College, Utah Valley University and Neumont University. While at Salt Lake Community College, he developed a broadcast journalism program for Spanish-speaking students. Spencer was also faculty advisor for Operation Smile at Utah Valley State College.

In 2007, he helped Dick Nourse, former KSL anchor and colleague, establish the Dick Nourse Center for Mass Communications and Journalism at Dixie State College in St. George, Utah.

== Campaigns ==
Spencer ran for Utah State Senate District 5 in 2000, and again in 2002 for District 11, losing both races.

=== 2008 congressional race ===
In May 2008, Spencer was nominated by Dick Nourse and unopposed as the Democratic candidate for Utah's 3rd Congressional District. Spencer was considered a long shot against Jason Chaffetz in the heavily Republican 3rd district.

In August 2008, he received international press for commenting to The Salt Lake Tribune about how Jesus would vote. Spencer indicated positively when asked if he thought that he would win Jesus' vote, a statement he later retracted under pressure from conservative media.

Bennion lost with 28 percent of the vote to Chaffetz's 66 percent.

== Sources ==
- "Meet Bennion Spencer, candidate for Utah's 3rd Congressional District". The Utah Amicus. April 7, 2008.
- Bernick, Bob Jr. (March 18, 2008). "Riverton professor to seek 3rd District seat as a Demo". Deseret News. Archived from the original on June 29, 2008.
