= Chris Cannon =

American politician (1950–2024)

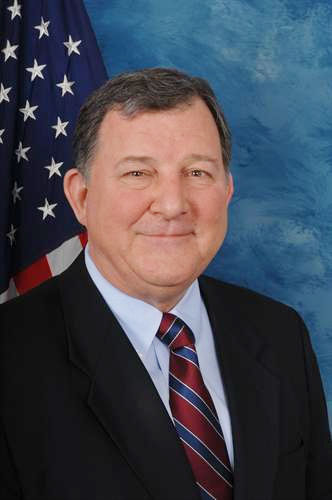
- Official portrait, 2007

Member of the U.S. House of Representatives from Utah's 3rd district
- In office January 3, 1997 – January 3, 2009
- Preceded by: Bill Orton
- Succeeded by: Jason Chaffetz

Finance Chairman of the Utah Republican Party
- In office 1992–1994

Personal details
- Born: Christopher Black Cannon; October 20, 1950 Salt Lake City, Utah, U.S.
- Died: May 8, 2024 (aged 73) Provo, Utah, U.S.
- Party: Republican
- Spouse: Claudia Fox
- Children: 8
- Relatives: Joseph A. Cannon (brother)
- Education: Brigham Young University (B.S., J.D.); Harvard University

Christopher Black Cannon (October 20, 1950 – May 8, 2024) was an American politician who served in the United States House of Representatives representing Utah's 3rd congressional district from 1997 to 2009. He was a member of the Republican Party.

Cannon was first elected to Congress in 1996. In 2008, he lost renomination in the Republican primary to Jason Chaffetz.

== Personal life ==
Cannon was born in Salt Lake City, Utah, and attended Brigham Young University (BYU) as well as J. Reuben Clark Law School of BYU. From 1980 until 1996 he was a lawyer, business owner, and venture capitalist, from which he became a millionaire. His other jobs included time as an associate solicitor for the United States Department of the Interior from 1984 to 1986, and time as Utah Republican Party finance chairman from 1992 until 1994. On June 24, 2008, he was defeated in the 2008 Republican Party third district primary by Jason Chaffetz, former chief of staff to then-Utah Governor Jon Huntsman Jr.

Chris Cannon was a member of the Cannon family of Utah. His brother, Joe Cannon is the former GOP State Party Chairman, and was appointed Editor in Chief of the Deseret Morning News in November 2006. He was the third member of his family to serve in the House, but the first voting member. His great-grandfather, George Q. Cannon, was a nonvoting member of the House from 1873 to 1881, while Utah was still a territory, whose son Frank Cannon was the state's first senator, as well as a non voting delegate.

Cannon and his wife, Claudia, had eight children; their daughter, Rachel, died from cancer in 2005.

Cannon died in Provo on May 8, 2024, at the age of 73.

== Congressional career ==
In 1996, Cannon was the Republican candidate in Utah's 3rd District against Democratic incumbent Bill Orton, who had managed to hold the seat for three terms (all by fairly large margins) despite its heavy Republican tilt. This time, however, the district's partisan lean proved too much for Orton to overcome, and Cannon defeated him by four points. He never faced another general election contest nearly that close, and was reelected five times.

Cannon first entered the national spotlight in 1999, when as a member of the House Judiciary Subcommittee on Commercial and Administrative Law, he was one of 13 House managers who prosecuted the case against President Bill Clinton in the impeachment trial in the U.S. Senate.

Cannon was named Chairman of the Commercial and Administrative Law Subcommittee at the beginning of the 108th Congress in January 2003, and served as its ranking Republican from 2007 to 2009. He also served on the Judiciary Subcommittee on Courts, the Internet, and Intellectual Property.

Cannon was also a member of the House Government Reform Committee. He served on the Subcommittees on Criminal Justice, Drug Policy and Human Resources as well as Regulatory Affairs. Cannon was also a member of the House Resources Committee, serving on the Energy and Mineral Resources and Forests and Forest Health Subcommittees.

In 2000, Cannon co-founded the Congressional Caucus to Fight and Control Methamphetamine, which has nearly 130 members from both major political parties in 2008.

In January 2001, Cannon hired David Safavian as his chief of staff. Safavian left on May 16, 2002, to take a position at the General Services Administration. Safavian was arrested in September 2005 in connection with the Jack Abramoff corruption case, and was convicted in June 2006 on four felony counts.

In January 2003, Cannon was elected chairman of the influential Western Caucus, an organization of over 50 Congressmen working on resource management issues.

He was a cosponsor of HR 2043, legislation that would provide voting representation for the District of Columbia. The bill also gives another congressional seat to Utah.

== Campaigns and challengers ==
Cannon was one of the most conservative members of the House. He had a lifetime rating of 96 from the American Conservative Union. This is not surprising, as he represented one of the most Republican districts in the nation. President George W. Bush received 77% of the vote in the district in 2004, his second highest percentage for a congressional district not located in Texas. However, during his last three reelection bids, he faced primary challengers running well to his right.

=== 2004 ===
In 2004, Cannon defeated Republican challenger Matt Throckmorton in the primary, getting 58.4% of the vote, in a race in which the major issue dividing the candidates was immigration policy. He then beat Democratic opponent Beau Babka 63%–33% in the November race. Cannon spent more than $600,000 to defeat Throckmorton and Babka. Throckmorton raised $84,000; Babka spent $35,000. The spending imbalance was offset to some extent by immigration reform groups that attacked Cannon through billboards, ads, and websites, though these did not support his Democratic opponent.

=== 2006 ===
2006 Republican primary results Cannon 50–60% Cannon 60–70% Cannon 70–80%

==== Primary ====
Cannon faced opposition in the primaries from a fellow Republican for the first five times he ran (and won), but his opposition in 2006 seemed potentially stronger. In October 2005, millionaire real estate developer John D. Jacob announced that he would run against Cannon in 2006. In May 2006, at the state GOP convention, Jacob surprised Cannon by winning 52 percent of the delegate ballots to Cannon's 48 percent—a shocking result for a five-term incumbent. Had Jacob won 60 percent of the delegate ballots, he would have won the nomination outright and ended Cannon's congressional run. Team America PAC, a PAC dedicated to strict immigration enforcement, spent $50,000 on a radio advertising campaign attacking Cannon for his views on immigration ("A vote for John Jacob is a vote for cleaning up the immigration mess Chris Cannon helped make").

The Republican primary was held on June 27, 2006. Polls predicted a close race. However, Cannon received 32,306 votes (55.8%) and Jacob received 25,589 votes (44.2%).

==== General election ====
Cannon faced Democrat Christian Burridge, a consumer rights attorney and also a graduate of Brigham Young University's Law School, in November, as well as Jim Noorlander (Constitution Party) and Phil Hallman (Libertarian party). In the general election, Cannon received 92,621 votes (58%), Burridge 51,396 (32%), Noorlander 14,116 (9%) and Hallman 1,998 votes (1%). Cannon's 58 percent was somewhat closer than expected, given the heavy Republican tilt of his district.

=== 2008 ===
2008 Republican primary results Chaffetz: 50–60%; 60–70%; Cannon: 50–60%

In 2008, Cannon faced two primary opponents—Jason Chaffetz, a businessman and chief of staff to Governor Jon Huntsman, Jr. and David O. Leavitt, brother of former governor Mike Leavitt. On the first ballot at the state convention, Chaffetz received 59.01% of the delegate vote to Cannon's 40.9%. Chaffetz fell a few hundred votes short of clinching the nomination outright. Leavitt was eliminated, and immediately endorsed Cannon. Young Leavitt supporters then walked into the convention hall with newly toted signs in support of Cannon, which The Salt Lake Tribune termed "likely a violation of the convention rules." The rule supposedly referred to is "Physical Arrangements – 3(d)" which states "No signs may be placed in or around the staging area of the arena or in the convention hall between bleachers in the main Assembly Hall, except as approved by the State Party," which prohibits the placement of signs in the convention hall, but not the carrying nor holding of signs. The supporters were asked to leave the hall by the state vice chairman and exited when called upon to do so.

In the June 24 runoff primary, Chaffetz beat Cannon by nearly 9,000 votes, 60%–40%, ending Cannon's congressional career. Immigration policy was again a significant issue. Cannon refused to meet with Chaffetz after the election to discuss the transition.

== Controversies ==
=== Premium Beef of Nebraska ===
Cannon's financial disclosure statements showed that he gave a loan of between $50,000 and $100,000 to Gary Ruse, an executive and later president of First National Bank of Nebraska, in September 1996. The following year, the bank made a loan of $250,000 to the Premium Beef of Nebraska company, a kosher beef packing plant in which Cannon was a major investor. Ruse said in an interview he played no part in getting Cannon the loan. It was a decision, he said, that was made by the bank's board of directors; he had recused himself.

The Premium Beef plant operated for a little more than a year before closing its doors, after the rabbi who oversaw the preparation of the meat died. Cannon's chief of staff, Joe Hunter, said that the assets of the business were liquidated and Cannon repaid the loan to the Nebraska bank in 2001. The plant was sold to a Hasidic Jewish sect that took several years but finally reopened it in 2005. Ruse, who left the bank, was hired as manager for the reopened plant.

Cannon's personal loan to Ruse remains outstanding. Cannon spokesman Charles Isom said that Ruse made a payment on the loan in late 1996 and then payments on the interest in 2000 and 2001. According to Cannon's financial disclosure forms, Cannon collected between $200 and $1,000 in interest on Ruse's loan in 2000 and 2001. He did not collect interest in 2002 or 2003 and had not otherwise received interest payments.

Cannon's office stressed that the congressman made repeated efforts to collect the loan. Cannon's most recent financial disclosure forms show the amount outstanding is still over $50,000.

=== Lobbying by brother Joe Cannon ===
Chris Cannon's brother, Joseph Cannon, was chairman of the Utah Republican Party, a former business partner of his brother, and led a team of 10 lobbyists at Pillsbury Winthrop Shaw Pittman, a law and lobbying firm. From late 2006 to 2010, he served as editor of Utah's second-largest daily newspaper, Deseret Morning News (now Deseret News).

Cannon acknowledged helping his brother's clients, pointing out that he had been active on the issue in the past before being approached by his brother. "If my wife decided to lobby, then we would probably say, 'No talking to my office.' I just don't see my brother in the same category," Cannon said.

Cannon had a financial interest in his brother's success: The lobbyist owed him more than $250,000, according to the lawmaker's financial disclosure reports. The debt stems from Joseph Cannon's unsuccessful campaign for the U. S. Senate in 1992. Citizens for Responsibility and Ethics in Washington, a nonpartisan advocacy organization, named Chris Cannon a "member to watch" on its list of "most corrupt" members of Congress for his dealings with his brother.

=== Obama autobiography ===
Cannon offered Hertford College, Oxford philosopher Peter Millican $10,000 to prove that then-presidential candidate Barack Obama's memoir Dreams from My Father was ghostwritten by Bill Ayers by using computer analysis to compare that work to Ayers' Fugitive Days. During the 2008 U.S. presidential election, conservatives attempted to link Obama to Ayers, a former radical leader of the Weather Underground. Regarding the claim that Ayers authored Obama's book, Millican concluded, "I feel totally confident that it is false"

== Electoral history ==
Utah's 3rd congressional district: Results 1992–2006
Year	Democrat	Votes	Pct	Republican	Votes	Pct	3rd Party	Party	Votes	Pct	3rd Party	Party	Votes	Pct	
1996	Bill Orton	98,178	47%	Chris Cannon	106,220	51%	Amy L. Lassen	Libertarian	2,341	1%	Gerald Slothower	Unaffiliated	706	<1%	*
1998	(no candidate)			Chris Cannon	100,830	77%	Will Christensen	Independent American	20,720	16%	Kitty K. Burton	Libertarian	9,553	7%	*
2000	Donald Dunn	88,547	37%	Chris Cannon	138,943	59%	Michael J. Lehman	Independent American	5,436	2%	Kitty K. Burton	Libertarian	3,570	2%	*
2002	Nancy Jane Woodside	44,533	29%	Chris Cannon	103,598	67%	Kitty K. Burton	Libertarian	5,511	4%					*
2004	Beau Babka	88,748	33%	Chris Cannon	173,010	63%	Ronald Winfield	Constitution	5,089	2%	Jim Dexter	Libertarian	3,691	1%	*
2006	Christian Burridge	53,330	32%	Chris Cannon	95,455	58%	Jim Noorlander	Constitution	14,533	9%	Philip L. Hallman	Libertarian	2,080	1%	

*Write-in and minor candidate notes: In 1992, Nels J'Anthony received 384 votes. In 1996, John Phillip Langford received 270 votes. In 1998, write-ins received 20 votes. In 2000, Natural Law candidate Randall Tolpinrud received 852 votes. In 2002, John William Maurin received 1 vote. In 2004, Curtis Darrell James received 2,390 votes.

U.S. House of Representatives
Preceded by Bill Orton	Member of the U.S. House of Representatives from Utah's 3rd congressional district 1997–2009	Succeeded by Jason Chaffetz
