= Rob Bishop =

American politician (born 1951)

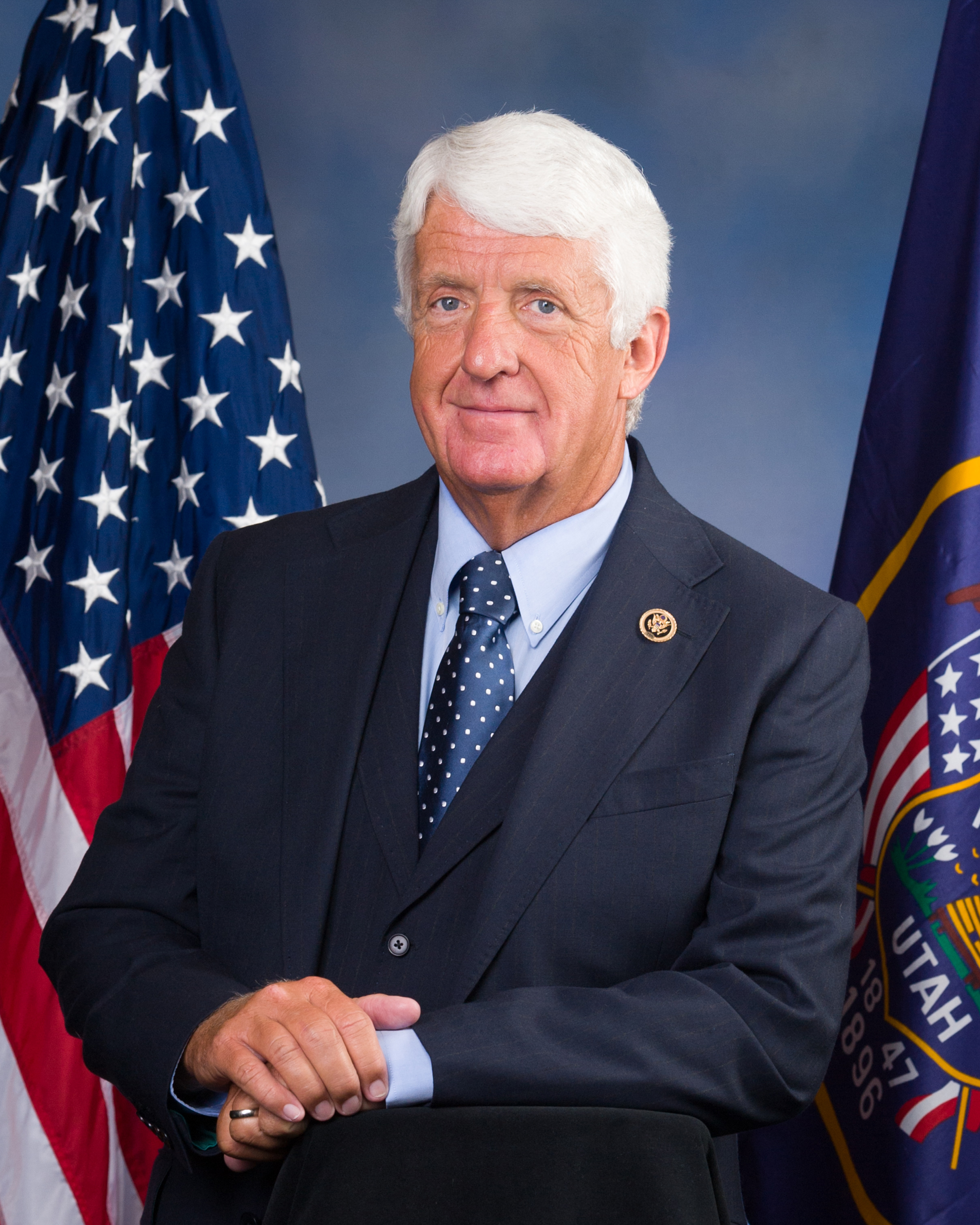

Member of the Utah House of Representatives
- Incumbent
- Assumed office May 6, 2026
- Preceded by: Matthew Gwynn
- Constituency: 6th district
- In office 1978–1994
- Preceded by: Willis Hansen (61st); Stephen Holbrook (2nd)
- Succeeded by: Richard Ellertson (61st); Peter C. Knudson (2nd)
- Constituency: 61st district (1978–1982); 2nd district (1982–1994)

Ranking Member of the House Natural Resources Committee
- In office January 3, 2019 – January 3, 2021
- Preceded by: Raúl Grijalva
- Succeeded by: Bruce Westerman

Chair of the House Natural Resources Committee
- In office January 3, 2015 – January 3, 2019
- Preceded by: Doc Hastings
- Succeeded by: Raúl Grijalva

Member of the U.S. House of Representatives from Utah's 1st district
- In office January 3, 2003 – January 3, 2021
- Preceded by: Jim Hansen
- Succeeded by: Blake Moore

Chair of the Utah Republican Party
- In office May 10, 1997 – August 25, 2001
- Preceded by: Frank Suitter
- Succeeded by: Joseph A. Cannon

Speaker of the Utah House of Representatives
- In office 1992–1994
- Preceded by: Craig Moody
- Succeeded by: Melvin R. Brown

Personal details
- Born: Robert William Bishop; July 13, 1951 (age 75) Kaysville, Utah, U.S.
- Party: Republican
- Spouse: Jeralynn Hansen
- Children: 5
- Education: University of Utah (BA)
- Bishop's voice Bishop criticizing failures of the Bureau of Land Management to properly survey the Red River in Texas. Recorded December 9, 2015

Robert William Bishop (born July 13, 1951) is an American politician who served as the U.S. representative for Utah's 1st congressional district from 2003 to 2021. A member of the Republican Party, he became the dean of Utah's congressional delegation after the retirement of Orrin Hatch from the U.S. Senate in 2019.

Prior to his congressional tenure, Bishop was a Utah State Representative (1978–1994), including two final years as Speaker of the Utah House of Representatives, as well as Chair of the Utah Republican Party (1997–2001). He was a candidate for Lieutenant Governor of Utah as Thomas Wright's running mate in the 2020 election.

On April 25, 2026, it was reported that Bishop had been selected to fill Matthew Gwynn's vacant seat in the state house.

== Early life and education ==
Bishop was born in Kaysville, Utah, and graduated from Davis High School. He served as a missionary for the Church of Jesus Christ of Latter Day Saints in Germany from 1970 until 1972. Bishop received a bachelor's degree in political science from the University of Utah in Salt Lake City in 1974.

== Career ==
He taught civics classes at Brigham City's Box Elder High School from 1974 to 1980; he next taught German in Ogden, Utah at Ben Lomond High School; then he returned to teaching government and history classes at Box Elder High School until his retirement from teaching in 2002. While a teacher at Box Elder, Bishop partnered with the Close Up Foundation to help students participate in Close Up's Washington, D.C.–based civic education programs.

=== Utah politics ===
Bishop was a member of the Utah House of Representatives from 1978 to 1994. He was House Majority Leader and later served as Speaker of the House from 1992 until 1994.

In 1997, he was elected chairman of the Utah Republican Party, and served for two terms in this position. He has also worked as a legislative lobbyist in Washington.

== U.S. House of Representatives ==
In 2002, Bishop returned to politics when he ran for the Republican nomination in the 1st District. 22-year incumbent Jim Hansen had recently announced his retirement. At the state Republican convention, he finished first in the seven-candidate field and went on to face State Representative Kevin Garn in a primary. He defeated Garn in that primary with 59.8 percent of the vote, all but assuring him of being the next congressman from this heavily Republican district. As expected, he won the general election with 61% of the vote. He has won re-election in 2004, 2006, 2008, 2010, and 2012 with even larger margins. In 2014, he was reelected with 64% of the vote.

In the 2016 election cycle, 92.6% of contributions to Bishop's political campaign came from outside Utah, the highest out-of-state percentage of any member of the House, with much of the contributions coming from the energy and agribusiness sectors, according to an analysis by OpenSecrets.

=== Political positions ===
==== Federalism ====
In 2010 Bishop introduced to the House an amendment to the United States Constitution, known as the "repeal amendment," which would allow a majority vote of the states to overturn any act of the United States Congress.

==== Land use and the environment ====
Bishop supports repeal of the Endangered Species Act of 1973, saying it has been "hijacked" to control land and block economic development, and that he "would love to invalidate" the law. Bishop is among those most critical of the Antiquities Act. Bishop opposed the designation of the Bears Ears National Monument and supports repealing or shrinking the designation. Bishop supports transferring federal public lands to the states. Despite this, Bishop sponsored a successful amendment to the 2006 National Defense Authorization Act to create the Cedar Mountain Wilderness, specifically to block transportation access to the Private Fuel Storage nuclear storage facility on Goshute's Skull Valley Indian Reservation land in Tooele County.

In February 2011, Bishop introduced a budget amendment that would have defunded the National Landscape Conservation System, which manages 27 million acres of Bureau of Land Management land, including the National Monument, National Conservation Area, National Wilderness Preservation, National Wild and Scenic Rivers, National Scenic Trail, National Historic Trail systems and other systems. After coming under fire for introducing this amendment, Bishop withdrew it.

On April 10, 2013, Bishop introduced the Ensuring Public Involvement in the Creation of National Monuments Act. The bill would amend the Antiquities Act of 1906 to subject national monument declarations by the President to the National Environmental Policy Act of 1969 (NEPA). At present, the President of the United States can unilaterally designate areas of federally-owned land as a national monument, whereas national parks and other areas are required to be enacted into law by the United States Congress. Bishop argued that "the American people deserve the opportunity to participate in land-use decisions regardless of whether they are made in Congress or by the President". He claims his new bill would ensure "that new national monuments are created openly with consideration of public input".

In March 2019, Bishop said that "the ideas behind the Green New Deal are tantamount to genocide". Asked to elaborate how this was similar to genocide, Bishop answered, "I’m an ethnic. I’m a westerner." Asked whether he believed that the Green New Deal would kill him, Bishop said, "If you actually implement everything they want to. Killing would be positive if you implement everything the Green New Deal actually wants to. That’s why the Green New Deal is not ready for prime time."

==== Utah GOP closed primary ====
Bishop was chairman of the Utah Republican Party when the decision was made to close primaries to nonparty members in the late 1990s. The Utah Democratic party holds open primaries. When asked about Democrats changing their party affiliation to vote in the 2020 Republican primary, he replied "instead of piddling around with the Republican primary. Doing it this way ... the best you can call it is dishonorable. It really is a slimy way of doing things." He said the only reason Democrats are attempting to "pervert the process" is to help advance a candidate. "That's inherently wrong," Bishop said. In an editorial, Bishop restated his view: "A leading Democrat wants to create havoc in the system. For what aim? Maybe to elect the 'correct' candidates? Maybe to help Democrats have a bigger voice in the elections?"

=== Committee assignments ===
- Committee on Natural Resources – Ranking Member
  - Subcommittee on Public Lands and Environmental Regulation
- House Armed Services Committee

=== Caucus memberships ===
- Tenth Amendment Task Force (Co-Founder)
- Second Amendment Task Force
- Congressional Lupus Caucus
- House GOP Policy Committee (Vice Chair)
- Co-founder of the Western States Coalition
- past Chairman of the Congressional Western Caucus
- Tea Party Caucus
- Republican Study Committee
- House Baltic Caucus
- Congressional Constitution Caucus (Co-Chair)
- Congressional Western Caucus
- United States Congressional International Conservation Caucus

=== Electoral history ===
Utah's 1st congressional district: Results 2002–2008
Year	Democratic	Votes	Pct	Republican	Votes	Pct	3rd Party	Party	Votes	Pct		3rd Party	Party	Votes	Pct
2002	Dave Thomas	66,104	37%	Rob Bishop	109,265	61%	Craig Axford	Green	4,027	2%	*				
2004	Steven Thompson	85,630	29%	Rob Bishop	199,615	68%	Charles Johnston	Constitution	4,510	2%		Richard W. Soderberg	Personal Choice	4,206	1%
2006	Steven Olsen	57,922	32%	Rob Bishop	112,546	63%	Mark Hudson	Constitution	5,539	3%		Lynn Badler	Libertarian	2,467	1%
2008	Morgan Bowen	87,139	30.4%	Rob Bishop	186,031	65.0%	Kirk D. Pearson	Constitution	6,861	2.4%		Joseph G. Buchman	Libertarian	6,287	2.2%

== Lieutenant gubernatorial candidacy ==
Bishop announced in July 2019 that he would not seek reelection to the House in 2020. He mentioned the same year that he was considering running for governor, but considered himself a "horrible" candidate.

He joined Thomas Wright's ticket as a candidate for lieutenant governor in the 2020 Utah gubernatorial election but later lost the primary.

== Personal life ==
Bishop is married to Jeralynn Hansen, a former Miss Peach Queen for Brigham City, Utah. He and his family reside in Brigham City. The Bishops have four sons and one daughter.

Well known for his three-piece suits, Bishop was named the third-best-dressed congressmen in 2012 according to the Washingtonian.

Political offices
Preceded by Craig Moody	Speaker of the Utah House of Representatives; 1992–1994	Succeeded by Melvin R. Brown
Party political offices
Preceded by Frank Suitter	Chair of the Utah Republican Party; 1997–2001	Succeeded by Joe Cannon
U.S. House of Representatives
Preceded by James Hansen	Member of the U.S. House of Representatives from Utah's 1st congressional district 2003–2021	Succeeded by Blake Moore
Preceded by Doc Hastings	Chair of the House Natural Resources Committee; 2015–2019	Succeeded by Raúl Grijalva
Preceded by Raúl Grijalva	Ranking Member of the House Natural Resources Committee; 2019–2021	Succeeded by Bruce Westerman
U.S. order of precedence (ceremonial)
Preceded by Earl Pomeroy as Former U.S. Representative	Order of precedence of the United States as Former U.S. Representative	Succeeded by Glenn English as Former U.S. Representative
