= Karen Shepherd =

American politician (born 1940)

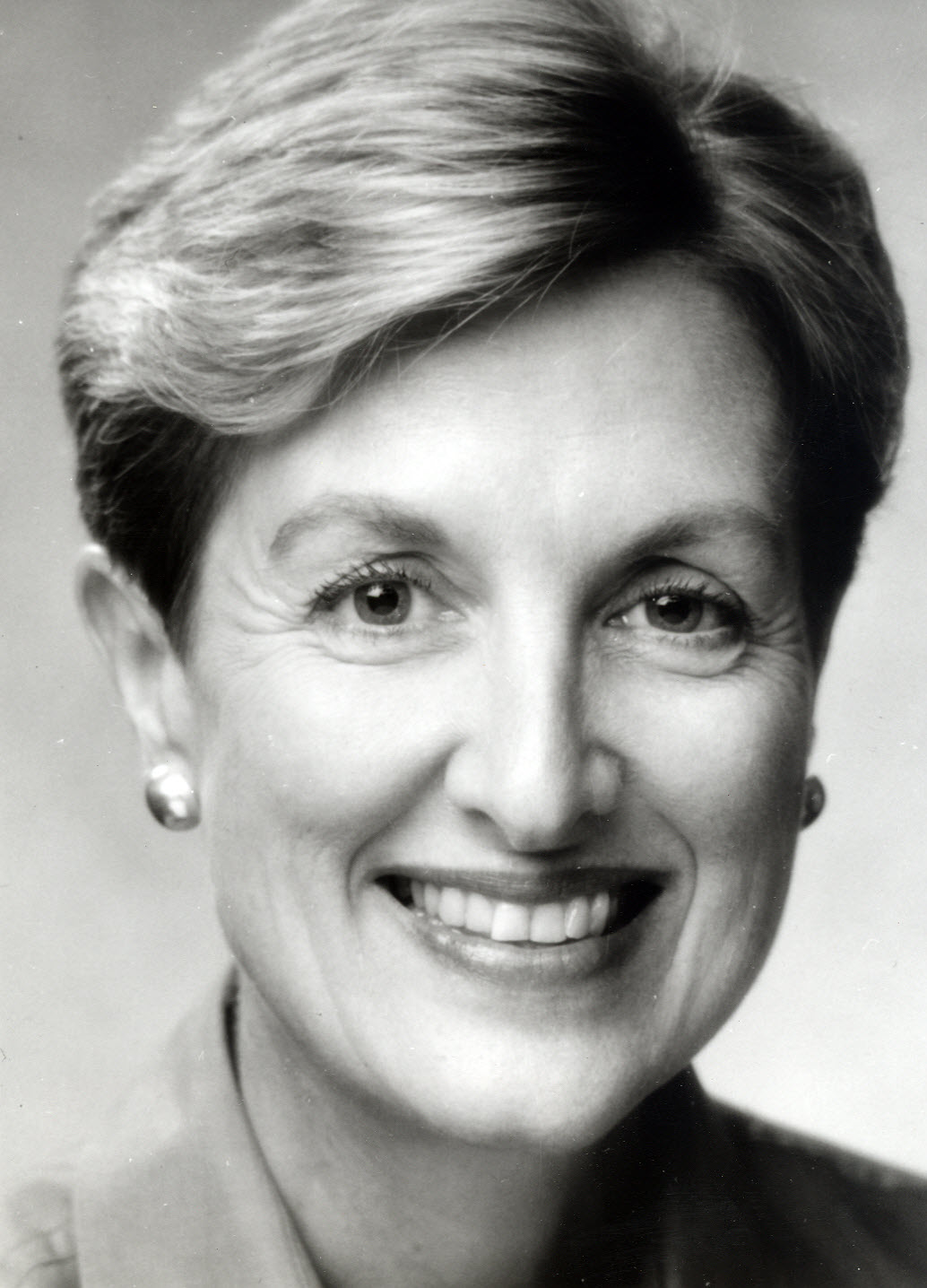

Member of the U.S. House of Representatives from Utah's 2nd district
- In office January 3, 1993 – January 3, 1995
- Preceded by: Wayne Owens
- Succeeded by: Enid Greene

Personal details
- Born: Karen Rae Felker; July 5, 1940 (age 86) Silver City, New Mexico, U.S.
- Party: Democratic
- Spouse: Vincent Shepherd
- Children: 2
- Education: University of Utah (BA); Brigham Young University (MA)

Karen Rae Shepherd (née Felker; born July 5, 1940) is an American politician who served in the United States House of Representatives from 1993 to 1995.

== Early life ==
Shepherd was born Karen Rae Felker in Silver City, New Mexico, where her father, Ralph Felker, worked for the U.S. Forest Service. The family soon moved to southern Utah and lived in many small towns throughout Shepherd's childhood as the Department of Agriculture transferred them from place to place until they settled in Provo where she went to high school. Shepherd earned a B.A. in English from the University of Utah in 1962 and went on to receive an M.A. in British Literature from Brigham Young University (BYU) in 1963.

In 1963 Shepherd married Vincent Shepherd and they moved to Fort Lewis, Washington, where he was an officer in the Army. In Washington, she taught English at Olympic Junior College. Upon her husband's discharge from the Army, the couple both accepted positions at the American University in Cairo, Egypt, where they lived for two years.

Returning to the U.S and resettling in Utah, the Shepherds had two children, Heather and Dylan. Vincent owned and operated a wholesale oil distributing company and Karen taught Freshman English at Brigham Young University. Shepherd became politically active with the Democratic Party, working for the Senate campaigns of both Wayne Owens and Frank Moss. Shepherd was the first woman ever to serve at cabinet level in Salt Lake County Government when she became Director of Social Services. In 1978, she became co-owner of Network Magazine, which focused on women's workplace issues, and she soon founded a publishing business, Webster Publishing. In 1988 she sold the business and the magazine and became the Director of Development at the University of Utah's School of Business. In 1990 Shepherd was elected to the Utah State Senate, taking the place of Frances Farley, who had been at that time the only woman serving in the Utah Senate. She served in the Utah Legislature two years before announcing that she would run to succeed the four-term Democratic incumbent, U.S. Representative Wayne Owens for his seat, after he announced he would not seek re-election but would, instead, run for the U.S. Senate.

== U.S. Congresswoman ==
Karen Shepherd's 1992 campaign platform led with a balanced budget, and support for government involvement in health care reform, education, abortion, and the environment. She put forward a 10-point plan for improving children's lives that included tracking down delinquent fathers and fully funding Head Start. In the general election she ran against Enid Greene who had been an aide to Utah Governor Norman Bangerter and was a fiscal and social conservative who opposed all of her positions. Shepherd won the race by a narrow 50 percent to 47 percent margin, becoming the second woman in Utah's history to be elected to Congress.

Once sworn into Congress in January 1993, Shepherd was placed on the Natural Resources and the Public Works and Transportation Committees. A leader in the Freshman Caucus, she became co-chair, along with Eric Fingerhut, of the freshman reform effort that prepared legislation to reform lobbying and campaign finance practices. Among many recommendations, they proposed gifts from lobbyists to lawmakers be banned and that Members be barred from chairing more than one committee. She supported President Clinton's 1993 Budget package that cut the budget and also raised taxes on upper income people. The budget passed by a single vote. "It seems to me it's not perfect," Shepherd said of the proposed budget. "But the worst of all of the alternatives is not to pass it, and not move forward to health care, free trade and all of these things we need to do." She also supported the Brady Bill and the Assault Weapon Ban. Her willingness to take tough stands in her District and at the same time stand up to her party on issues of reform led one prominent columnist to say just before her election, "But whether Shepherd wins or loses, her stand is a reminder of a formula for successful progressive politics that's been characteristic of the western states."

In her 1994 Election Shepherd faced Enid Greene again, however, Greene was now married and had changed her last name to Waldholtz. There was also a third candidate in the race, an independent, Merrill Cook. The campaign centered on Shepherd's votes on the Clinton budget and her support for gun control. Shepherd continued to support health and welfare reform and to speak out in support of what she called reasonable gun control. Waldholtz ran on "The Contract With America," originated by Newt Gingrich in Washington, D.C., and won the three-way race with 46 percent of the vote to Shepherd's 36 percent and Cook's 18 percent.

== Post Congressional career ==
Immediately upon leaving Congress Karen Shepherd was a Fellow at the Institute of Politics at the John F. Kennedy School of Government at Harvard University. In 1995 she served as part of an international delegation to monitor the first elections held on the West Bank and in Gaza. In 1996 President Clinton nominated her to serve as the executive director at the European Bank for Reconstruction and Development in London, U.K. where she served until 2002. While she was there, she chaired the East West Trade and Investment Forum of the American Chamber of Commerce and became a member of the Council on Foreign Relations. Returning to the United States in 2002, she worked as a regional advisor for Emily's List, served on three corporate boards as well as on the national Planned Parenthood Action Council, and in Utah, served on the boards of Wasatch Homeless Health Care Inc. and the University of Utah's Humanities Partnership and the David Eccles School of Business.

== Electoral history ==
Utah's 2nd congressional district: Results 1992–1994
Year	Democrat	Votes	Pct	Republican	Votes	Pct	3rd Party	Party	Votes	Pct	
1992	Karen Shepherd	127,738	50%	Enid Greene *	118,307	47%	A. Peter Crane	Independent	6,274	2%	*
1994	Karen Shepherd	66,911	36%	Enid Greene Waldholtz *	85,507	46%	Merrill Cook	Independent	34,167	18%	

* The same person; Enid Greene married Joe Waldholtz in the interim between the 1992 and 1994 election (and later divorced him, reverting to her maiden name). ** Write-in and minor candidate notes: In 1992, Eileen Koschak of the Socialist Workers Party received 650 votes.

== See also ==
- Women in the United States House of Representatives

U.S. House of Representatives
Preceded by Wayne Owens	Member of the U.S. House of Representatives from Utah's 2nd congressional district 1993–1995	Succeeded by Enid Greene
U.S. order of precedence (ceremonial)
Preceded by David Smith Monson as Former U.S. Representative	Order of precedence of the United States as Former U.S. Representative	Succeeded by Enid Greene as Former U.S. Representative
