= Deedee Corradini =

American politician (1944 – 2015)

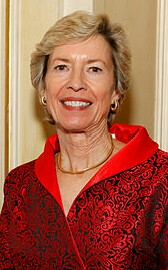

32nd Mayor of Salt Lake City
- In office 1992 – January 3, 2000
- Preceded by: Palmer DePaulis
- Succeeded by: Rocky Anderson

56th President of the United States Conference of Mayors
- In office 1998–1999
- Preceded by: Paul Helmke
- Succeeded by: Wellington Webb

Personal details
- Born: Margaret Louise McMullen; April 11, 1944 Providence, Rhode Island, U.S.
- Died: March 1, 2015 (aged 70) Park City, Utah, U.S.
- Party: Democratic
- Profession: Businesswoman and politician

Margaret "Deedee" McMullen Corradini (April 11, 1944 – March 1, 2015) was an American businesswoman and politician who served as the 32nd mayor of Salt Lake City, Utah, from 1992 to 2000. Corradini was the first woman to serve as mayor of Salt Lake City.

Corradini, at the time of her death Senior Vice President for Prudential Utah Real Estate, was also the President of Women's Ski Jumping-USA. She was on the WSJ-USA board, and served as president for three years, taking a lead role in the battle to get women's ski jumping into the Olympic Winter Games.

== Life and career ==
Corradini was born Margaret Louise McMullen (although Deedee was a childhood nickname) in Providence, Rhode Island, the daughter of Marie-Louise (Strehlau) and the Rev. Horace "Mac" Martin McMullen. Corradini attended school in Lebanon and Syria for 11 years as a child. She attended Drew University from 1961 to 1963. She received a Bachelor of Arts in 1965 and a Master's degree in 1967, both in Psychology from the University of Utah. She served as Press Secretary to Congressman Wayne Owens of Utah and then Rep. Richard Ottinger of New York in the early 1970s.

Although Utah leans strongly toward the Republican party, Corradini was a Democrat. This is not unusual for Salt Lake City, which tends to vote Democratic far more than other regions of Utah.

Corradini was fluent in French and Arabic.

Corradini's efforts gave Utah the initial shove that landed the state the 2002 Winter Olympics. Corradini was the first woman to receive the Olympic flag, in front of a television audience of hundreds of millions of viewers, when it was passed to Salt Lake City at the 1998 Winter Olympics in Nagano, Japan at the closing ceremonies.

Under Corradini's watch, the city's population experienced a tremendous growth spurt, as the metropolitan area of Salt Lake City and the rest of the state began to grow by thousands of families a month.

But she also endured scrutiny as a result of the fallout of Bonneville Pacific, a publicly traded alternative energy producer that went through bankruptcy proceedings in 1991. While never an executive of the company, Corradini had been a director, and - facing being dragged into years-long legal proceedings which would cost millions regardless of actual responsibility or outcome - agreed to a settlement of $805,000, a huge amount given that no responsibility or liability had or has ever been shown. Corradini was later criticized for soliciting some $231,000 in cash gifts and loans from friends and acquaintances to help pay the settlement; although insinuations were made, particularly in the alternative press, no serious allegations of impropriety were ever advanced. In January 1999, she announced she would not seek reelection the following year.

The ACLU and the First Unitarian Church of Salt Lake City, among others (including her successor Rocky Anderson), were upset with a deal she negotiated on behalf of the city to sell a block of Main Street — then city property — adjacent to Temple Square to the Church of Jesus Christ of Latter-day Saints (LDS Church). However, the conversion of this block into a church plaza was one of the 14 major projects put forth by the city in its 1962 Second Century Plan. The 1962 plan stated: "It is proposed that Main Street between the two church blocks either be closed to vehicular traffic or an underpass installed. This would strongly unify these two blocks as a visual anchor on the north end."

During her tenure, Corradini pushed hard (and ultimately successfully) for the relocation of the Union Pacific railroad tracks that divided downtown, pushed through the TRAX light-rail system, and won massive federal funding for reconstruction of the freeway system in advance of the Olympic Games (one of the largest single public works transit projects in recent American history). She also was the guiding force for the construction of the popular baseball stadium for the (then) AAA Salt Lake Buzz, at the time, the farm team for the Minnesota Twins), the redevelopment of a 50-year-old rail yard into the 30-acre (121,000 m^{2}), $375 million The Gateway mixed-use development, resulting in two million square feet (186,000 m^{2}) of shops, restaurants, office space, and housing, a 12-screen movie theatre, the Clark Planetarium, and Discovery Gateway, a children's museum.

Corradini served as the President of the U.S. Conference of Mayors in 1998. She was also President of the International Women's Forum, Chair of the Utah Symphony Board of Directors, of which she was a Lifetime Board Member.

Corradini died from lung cancer on March 1, 2015, at the age of 70.

== 2002 Winter Olympics ==
Corradini's efforts gave Utah the initial shove that landed the state the 2002 Winter Olympics.

Corradini crisscrossed the globe meeting with International Olympic Committee members for Salt Lake City's 2002 bid. She lobbied the Utah Legislature for a voter-approved sales-tax hike to build winter-sports facilities to help lure the Winter Games.

Corradini was the first woman to receive the Olympic flag, in front of a television audience of hundreds of millions of viewers, when it was passed to Salt Lake City at the 1998 Winter Olympics in Nagano, Japan at the closing ceremonies.

Corradini was instrumental in adding women's bobsleigh and skeleton events to the 2002 Olympics in Utah.

=== Women's ski jumping ===
Corradini campaigned for the 2002 Winter Olympics as mayor and then led the effort to bring women's ski jumping to the Winter Games. When the International Olympic Committee (IOC) told her and women ski jumpers in 2008 regarding participation in the 2010 Winter Olympics that women would not be allowed to jump, Corradini and other women ski jump advocates then filed suit in Canada, suggesting that exclusion of the event violated the human rights of the athletes. The lawsuit was rejected before the 2010 Winter Olympics. In 2011, based on improvements in performance and participation, the IOC gave its approval to add women's ski jumping, starting with the upcoming 2014 Winter Olympics. For nearly a decade, Corradini had led the fight, which included an appeal to the Supreme Court of Canada when athletes fought for the right to compete in the 2010 Winter Olympics.The IOC twice ruled against adding the sport to the Vancouver Games, saying participation worldwide wasn't widespread enough.

After women's ski jumping was added to the Olympic program, Corradini said: "We have only one event, and that's the normal hill jump. The men have normal hill, large hill, the team event and Nordic combined. We're already thinking 2018 to become really equal with the men, so we still have our work cut out for us."

== SLC Transit ==
During her tenure, Corradini pushed hard (and ultimately successfully) for the relocation of the Union Pacific railroad tracks that divided downtown, pushed through the TRAX light-rail system, and won massive federal funding for reconstruction of the freeway system in advance of the 2002 Winter Olympic Games (one of the largest single public works transit projects in recent American history).

Corradini became an early advocate for light rail, which debuted on Main Street in the final year of her mayoral run. She helped lay the groundwork for a transportation hub that connects TRAX, FrontRunner commuter trains and buses in what used to be the city's red-light district.

In championing the initial TRAX spur, Corradini ran into stiff resistance from business owners, who balked at having Main Street torn up for months of construction to accommodate the rails.

== Infrastructure ==
Corradini pushed to renovate the blighted west side of the city's business district with an ambitious 50-block project that involved moving roads, bridges and freeway corridors. That paved the way for The Gateway shopping and residential center — a $375 million mixed-use development boasting 2 million square feet of shops, restaurants, offices and housing, as well as a 12-screen movie theater, a planetarium and a children's museum.

Corradini also led the effort to renovate Salt Lake City International Airport and added a third runway.

== Community involvement and awards ==
- President of the U.S. Conference of Mayors in 1998
- President of Women's Ski Jumping USA for more than 10 years
- President of the International Women's Forum
- Chair of the Utah Symphony Board of Directors, of which she was a Lifetime Board Member
- Served on the board of Utah Power and Light
- One of the first female members of the Alta Club
- Senior Distinguished Fellow in Urban Studies at The Richard W. Riley Institute of Government, Politics and Public Leadership at Furman University
- Senior Vice President of Prudential Utah Real Estate
- In 2012, Corradini was recognized by Women's eNews as part of the "21 Leaders for the 21st Century."
- Presented with a World Championships bib, signed by 30 of the top women jumpers in the world in 2015

Political offices
Preceded by Palmer DePaulis	Mayor of Salt Lake City; 1992 – January 3, 2000	Succeeded by Rocky Anderson
