= Merrill Cook =

American politician (1946–2026)

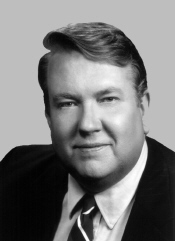

Member of the U.S. House of Representatives from Utah's 2nd district
- In office January 3, 1997 – January 3, 2001
- Preceded by: Enid Greene
- Succeeded by: Jim Matheson

Personal details
- Born: Merrill Alonzo Cook; May 6, 1946 Philadelphia, Pennsylvania, U.S.
- Died: March 9, 2026 (aged 79) Salt Lake City, Utah, U.S.
- Party: Republican (before 1988, 1996–2026); Independent (1988–1996)
- Spouse: Camille Sanders (died 2015)
- Children: 5
- Education: University of Utah (BA); Harvard University (MBA)

Merrill Alonzo Cook (May 6, 1946 – March 9, 2026) was an American politician and businessman who served as a Republican Party member in the United States House of Representatives from Utah.

== Early life and education ==
Born in Philadelphia, Pennsylvania, and raised in Salt Lake City, Utah, Cook was the son of scientist Melvin A. Cook who pioneered the development of slurry explosives. He graduated from East High School in 1964 and the University of Utah in 1969 and earned an M.B.A. from Harvard Business School in 1971. He was hired as a budget analyst by Arthur D. Little, Inc. and in 1973 founded Cook Slurry Company, a mining explosives manufacturer, of which he served as president and chief executive.

== Political career ==
Prior to his election to Congress, Cook ran for office a number of times both as a Republican and on the Utah Independent ticket, a party he founded himself in 1988. Cook ran for Utah Board of Education in 1984, Mayor of Salt Lake City in a 1985 special election, and Salt Lake County Commission in 1986, all to no avail.

Cook made his first bid for Governor of Utah in 1988, finishing third with 21% of the vote. His candidacy siphoned off enough votes from the Republican and Democratic candidates, incumbent governor Norm Bangerter and former Salt Lake City mayor Ted Wilson, that Bangerter won by just a 40% plurality over Wilson's 38% of the vote. Cook made a second run for governor in 1992, coming in second with 34% to Republican nominee Mike Leavitt's 42% and Democrat Stewart Hanson's 23%. In 1994, he ran for Congress in Utah's 2nd district, taking third place with 18% behind Republican victor Enid Greene and Democratic incumbent Karen Shepherd.

However, in 1996, after incumbent Republican Enid Greene announced she would not run for reelection due to a scandal, Cook rejoined the Republican Party. He managed to come in second at the state convention behind the choice of the party establishment, Salt Lake City accountant R. Todd Neilson, getting just enough votes to deny Neilson the nomination outright. Cook won the primary a few months later by 4 percentage points. He faced future Salt Lake City mayor Rocky Anderson in the general election. Calling Anderson "too socially liberal for Utah," Cook won with 56 percent of the vote despite losing the district's share of Salt Lake City.

In 1998, Cook was accused of instances of erratic behavior. He was briefly banned from state Republican headquarters after an obscenity-laced tirade, his reaction to being told his name had been eliminated from a GOP get-out-the-vote effort to which Cook's campaign had contributed $25,000. He, nevertheless, won by 10 percentage points. He demoted his chief of staff Janet Jenson a few days after the election; in an email, Jenson told her colleagues, "Merrill has taken up permanent residence in whacko land. If he asks you to fax his underwear to the speaker's office, please just do it."

In 2000, the Democrats nominated environmental consultant Jim Matheson, the son of former popular Democratic governor Scott Matheson. Polls showing Cook far behind Matheson made many Republicans nervous about their chances of holding the seat, especially considering that the 2nd has historically been much friendlier to Democrats than the rest of Utah. Despite local Republicans' misgivings about Cook, the national party strongly backed him. However, in an ominous sign, Cook was forced into a primary against computer tycoon Derek Smith, who was making his first run for elected office. In the primary, Smith defeated Cook by a 15-point margin, taking 57 percent to Cook's 42 percent. Matheson easily defeated Smith at the general election in November.

Cook ran for mayor of Salt Lake County in 2004 as an independent, but garnered only 8 percent of the vote in a race won by Democrat Peter Corroon. In 2006 he tried to challenge 3rd District Congressman Chris Cannon but was eliminated on the first ballot.

He ran for his old seat in the 2nd district in the 2008 election. Cook's political activities were largely enabled by self-financing. His personal expenditures for campaigns for office and ballot initiatives were over $4 million Cook lost the Republican nomination to Bill Dew at the Utah State GOP Convention on May 10, 2008, where Dew received 69% of the vote.

Cook ran for the Republican nomination for U.S. Senate in 2010 against incumbent Bob Bennett, but did not make it past the first round of balloting at the state convention.

== Personal life and death ==
Cook married Camille Sanders with whom he had five children. They were both members of the Church of Jesus Christ of Latter-day Saints. Camille, an opera singer, died of complications from Alzheimer's disease on January 15, 2015.

Cook died in Salt Lake City, Utah, on March 9, 2026, at the age of 79.

== Electoral history ==
Utah's 2nd congressional district: Results 1994–1998
| Year | Democrat | Votes | Pct | Republican | Votes | Pct | 3rd Party | Party | Votes | Pct | 3rd Party | Party | Votes | Pct | |
|---|---|---|---|---|---|---|---|---|---|---|---|---|---|---|---|
| 1994 | Karen Shepherd | 66,911 | 36% | Enid G. Waldholtz | 85,507 | 46% | Merrill Cook | Independent | 34,167 | 18% | | | | | |
| 1996 | Rocky Anderson | 100,283 | 42% | Merrill Cook | 129,963 | 55% | Arly H. Pedersen | Independent American | 3,070 | 1% | Catherine Carter | Natural Law | 2,981 | 1% | * |
| 1998 | Lily Eskelsen | 77,198 | 43% | Merrill Cook | 93,718 | 53% | Ken Larsen | Independent | 3,998 | 2% | Brian E. Swim | Libertarian | 1,390 | 1% | * |

*Write-in and minor candidate notes: In 1996, write-ins received 24 votes. In 1998, Arly H. Pedersen received 813 votes and Robert C. Lesh received 524 votes.

== See also ==
- United States Senate election in Utah, 2010

U.S. House of Representatives
| Preceded by Enid Greene | Member of the U.S. House of Representatives from Utah's 2nd congressional district 1997–2001 | Succeeded by Jim Matheson |
