= Enid Greene Mickelsen =

American politician (born 1958)

Enid Greene
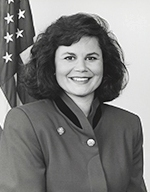

Member of the U.S. House of Representatives from Utah's 2nd district
- In office January 3, 1995 – January 3, 1997
- Preceded by: Karen Shepherd
- Succeeded by: Merrill Cook

Personal details
- Born: June 5, 1958 (age 68) San Rafael, California, U.S.
- Party: Republican
- Spouses: Joe Waldholtz (m. 1993; div. 1996); Scott J. Mickelsen (m. 2008)
- Children: 1
- Education: University of Utah (BA); Brigham Young University (JD)

Enid Greene Mickelsen, formerly Enid Greene Waldholtz (born June 5, 1958), is an American politician from the state of Utah who served one term in the United States House of Representatives. She was the third woman and first Republican woman elected to Congress from Utah.

== Early life ==
Greene was born in San Rafael, California, to naval officer and financier D. Forrest Greene and Gerda Marie Beyer. She is one of five children. She graduated from East High School and earned her B.A. from the University of Utah in 1980. She received her J.D. degree from Brigham Young University in 1983.

She worked as a lawyer for software company Novell and then at a Salt Lake City law firm. She was deputy chief of staff for Governor Norman H. Bangerter.

Mickelsen and Jon Huntsman Jr. were co-directors of Ronald Reagan's campaign in Utah.

== Career ==
=== Run for the U.S. House of Representatives ===
While serving as chair of the Young Republican National Federation (YRNF), Enid met Joe Waldholtz, and they were soon in a relationship. Greene ran for the House of Representatives in 1992 against Karen Shepherd for the Utah Second District, which was entirely contained in Salt Lake County at that time, losing by four percentage points.

=== Second run for U.S. House of Representatives ===
Greene married Waldholtz in 1993. After her marriage, Greene took the name Enid Greene Waldholtz. During her 1994 rematch against Shepherd, Joe acted as her campaign manager. Her campaign spent approximately $2 million, the most expensive House race in the country that year. Greene was swept into the 104th Congress in the Republican landslide in November. She was named to the House Rules Committee, the first freshman on that committee in over 80 years.

In March 1995, she announced she was pregnant. Greene became the second representative ever to give birth while in office (the first being Yvonne Brathwaite Burke) and the first Republican.

=== Financial scandal ===
Her term was marred with scandal as her campaign was accused of finance violations. Almost $1.8 million of the money spent in the 1994 campaign came from her husband, Joe, who had embezzled nearly $4 million from her father. Joe Waldholtz disappeared in November 1995 for six days before surrendering to the police. During that time, she announced that she was suing for divorce, for custody of her daughter, and to change her name to 'Enid Greene'. The Washington Post reported Waldholtz was addicted to heroin.

Under pressure from Utah Republicans, she announced on March 5, 1996 her plans to not seek re-election to Congress. Joe Waldholtz pleaded guilty to federal charges of tax, bank, and campaign fraud. While released on parole, Joe Waldholtz was subsequently convicted of forging insurance and Veterans Affairs checks from his stepmother and his late father. He was sentenced to three to 15 years in prison.

After Enid’s decision to not seek reelection, no woman was elected to a seat in the federal house or senate from Utah until Mia Love in 2014.

=== Comeback ===
Greene slowly returned to Utah state politics. In 2003, she was elected vice chair of the Utah Republican Party.

Greene was a candidate for Lieutenant Governor of Utah in 2004, but her ticket with gubernatorial candidate Nolan Karras was unsuccessful, garnering only 34% of the vote in the Republican primary.

After losing in the primary, Greene became Utah Republican vice chair. She became acting chair of the Utah Republican Party upon the resignation of Joe Cannon in November 2006. She was unanimously elected to serve as state party chair in February 2007 until the next convention in June 2007.

Enid Greene remarried in 2008 to then sheriff's deputy Scott J. Mickelsen, who later became a judge. She was a delegate at the 2012 Republican National convention, served as chair of the 2016 Republican National Convention Site Selection Committee, and was appointed by RNC Chair Reince Priebus as chair of the 2016 Republican Convention Rules Committee.

== Electoral history ==
Utah's 2nd congressional district: Results 1992–1994
Year	Democrat	Votes	Pct	Republican	Votes	Pct	3rd Party	Party	Votes	Pct	
1992	Karen Shepherd	127,738	50%	Enid Greene	118,307	47%	A. Peter Crane	Independent	6,274	2%	*
1994	Karen Shepherd	66,911	36%	Enid Greene Waldholtz	85,507	46%	Merrill Cook	Independent	34,167	18%	

* Write-in and minor candidate notes: In 1992, Eileen Koschak of the Socialist Workers party received 650 votes.

== See also ==
- Women in the United States House of Representatives

== Notes ==
U.S. House of Representatives
Preceded by Karen Shepherd	Member of the U.S. House of Representatives from Utah's 2nd congressional district 1995–1997	Succeeded by Merrill Cook
U.S. order of precedence (ceremonial)
Preceded by Karen Shepherd as Former U.S. Representative	Order of precedence of the United States as Former U.S. Representative	Succeeded by Ben McAdams as Former U.S. Representative
