= Arthur V. Watkins =

American politician

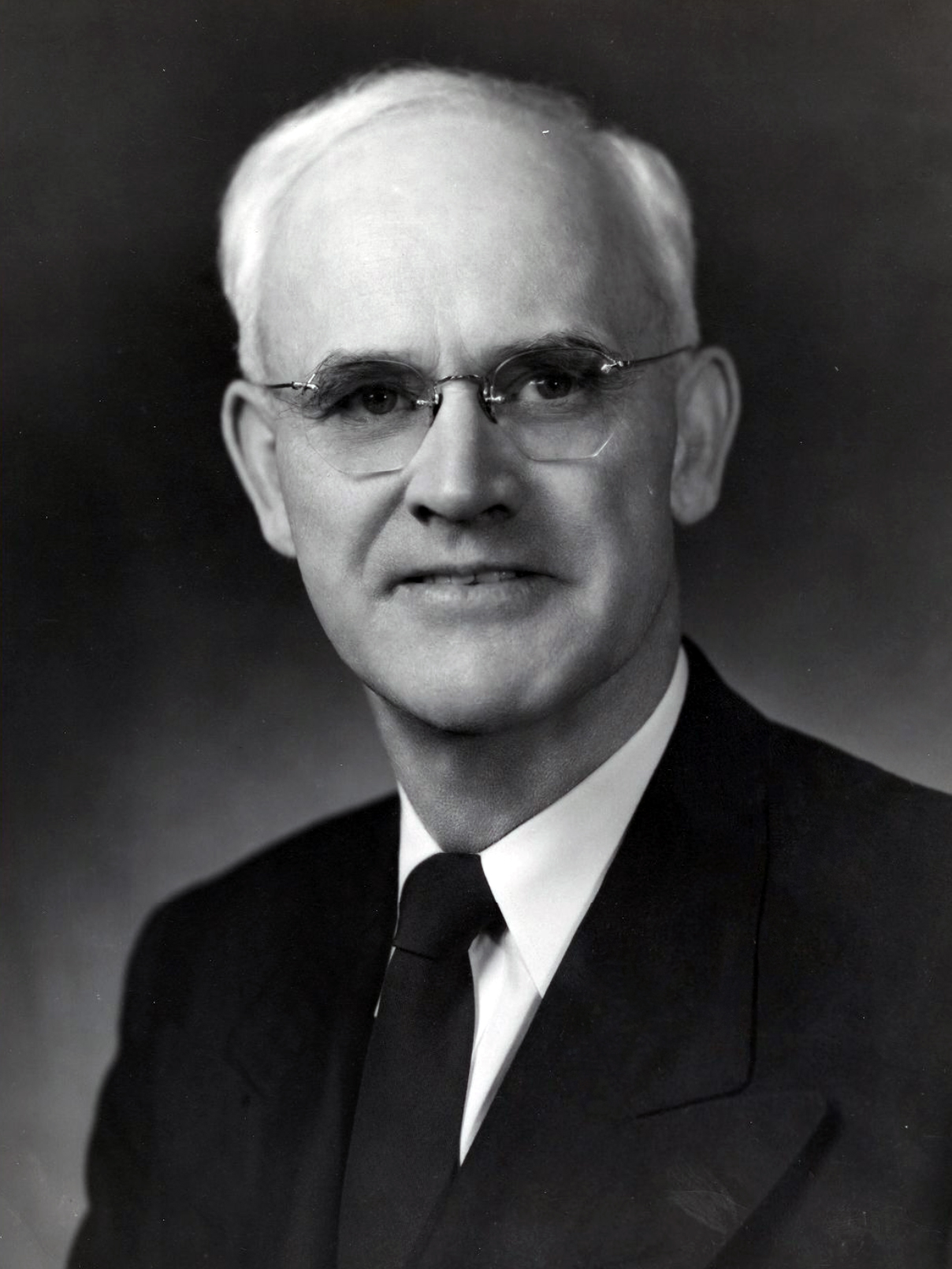

United States Senator from Utah
- In office January 3, 1947 – January 3, 1959
- Preceded by: Abe Murdock
- Succeeded by: Frank Moss

Personal details
- Born: December 18, 1886 Midway, Utah Territory
- Died: September 1, 1973 (aged 86) Orem, Utah, U.S.
- Party: Republican
- Education: Brigham Young University; New York University; Columbia University Law School

Arthur Vivian Watkins (December 18, 1886 – September 1, 1973) was a Republican U.S. senator from Utah, serving two terms from 1947 to 1959. He was influential as a proponent of terminating federal recognition of American Indian tribes, in the belief that they should be assimilated and all treaty rights abrogated. In 1954 he chaired the Watkins Committee, which led to the censure of Senator Joseph McCarthy, who had made extensive allegations of communist infiltration of government and art groups. Watkins voted in favor of the Civil Rights Act of 1957.

== Biography ==
Watkins was born in Midway, Wasatch County, Utah to Arthur Watkins (1864–1959) and Emily Adelia Gerber (1864–1947). He was the eldest of 6 siblings. He attended Brigham Young University (BYU) from 1903 to 1906, and New York University (NYU) from 1909 to 1910. He graduated from Columbia University Law School in 1912, and returned to Utah. There he was admitted to the bar the same year and commenced practice in Vernal, Utah.

He founded and edited a weekly newspaper in Utah County in 1914 called The Voice of Sharon, which eventually became the Orem-Geneva Times. In the same year, Watkins was appointed assistant county attorney of Salt Lake County. From 1919 to 1925, he ran a 600-acre (2.4 km^{2}) ranch near Lehi.

Watkins served as district judge of the Fourth Judicial District of Utah 1928–1933, losing his position in the Roosevelt Democratic landslide in 1932. In the early 1930s, he served as the director of the Provo River Water Users Association and director of the Orem Chamber of Commerce. An unsuccessful candidate for the Republican nomination to the Seventy-fifth Congress in 1936, Watkins was elected as a Republican to the United States Senate in 1946, and reelected in 1952. He served from January 3, 1947, to January 3, 1959.

=== Personal life ===
Watkins was a lifelong member of the Church of Jesus Christ of Latter-day Saints (LDS Church) and took up his missionary call in 1907, going to missions in New York and New Jersey. In 1929, he moved to the Wasatch Front Community near Orem, and was selected to serve as the president upon the creation of Utah's Sharon Stake by the LDS Church. Watkins held that position until he left to move to Washington, DC as a Senator in 1946. His orthodoxy and faith blurred the lines between civic and religious duties, as can be seen in correspondence to the church general authorities written on April 13, 1954:

The more I go into this Indian problem the more I am convinced that we have made some terrible mistakes in the past. It seems to me that the time has come for us to correct some of these mistakes and help the Indians stand on their own two feet and become a white and delightsome people as the Book of Mormon prophesied they would become. Of course, I realize that the Gospel of Jesus Christ will be the motivating factor, but it is difficult to teach the Gospel when they don't understand the English language and have had no training in caring for themselves. The Gospel should be a great stimulus and I am longing and praying for the time when the Indians will accept it in overwhelming numbers.

— Arthur V. Watkins

While serving as a missionary in New York, Watkins met Andrea Rich. They married in Salt Lake City on June 18, 1913, and had six children. After his first wife's death, on March 1, 1972, Watkins married Dorothy Eva Watkins in Salt Lake City. After their marriage, they relocated to Orem.

== Senate ==
=== Weber Basin Project ===
Planning for the Weber Basin Project began in 1942, but was suspended during the war years. After Watkins' election to the Senate in 1946, with increasing demand for municipal water and the need for irrigation of farmland, he began pushing for a reintroduction of legislation supporting the development plan. Investigations were made in January 1948, leading to a report issued in July 1949 recommending creation of a reservoir to store surplus water from the Ogden and Weber rivers that could later be accessed for use on farmland.

On August 29, 1949, Congress authorized the project (63 Stat. 677) which empowered the United States Secretary of the Interior, through the Bureau of Reclamation "to construct, operate, and maintain reservoirs, irrigation and drainage works, power plants, and transmission lines in the area." It authorized that a conservancy organization within the State of Utah could be developed to collect taxes and make the project self-supporting. On July 9, 1952, the first appropriation of construction funds was made. In 1969, to honor Watkins for making the project come to life, the Willard Dam was renamed the Arthur V. Watkins Dam.

=== Indian affairs ===
Watkins was appointed chair of the Senate Interior Committee Subcommittee on Indian Affairs in 1947, shortly after he was elected to the Senate. Though his Mormon beliefs concerning Native Americans (see Lamanite) have been cited by many as a basis for the Indian termination policy Watkins pursued, he was also influenced by not only his childhood growing up in the west on the fringe of the Uintah and Ouray Reservation, but also by various cultural movements at the time. The "Culture of Conformity" –endless pressure to be stable and normal, and to fear the "godless Communist menace" – which characterized 1950s America, pushed society as a whole to relish the American sense of freedom, as well as responsibility.

These values can clearly be seen in what Watkins called his policy, "the freeing of the Indian from wardship status," equating it with the Emancipation Proclamation, which freed slaves during the Civil War. Watkins was the driving force behind termination. His position as chairman of the United States Senate Subcommittee on Indian Affairs gave him tremendous leverage to determine the direction of federal Indian policy and he consolidated his influence through other western legislators. While partisanship may have played a role, geographic location may have been a much stronger motivator than party affiliation. The largest concentration of Native populations and federal lands were located in western states, as were national parks and dam projects.

He initially met with Wyoming Republican Congressman William H. Harrison and Orme Lewis, Arizona Republican and Assistant Secretary of the Interior, to map out a strategy on February 27, 1953. Subsequent talks were held with South Dakota Republican Congressman E.Y. Berry, Nevada Democratic Senator Patrick McCarran, South Dakota Republican Senator Karl E. Mundt, North Dakota Republican Senator William Langer, and Washington Democratic Senator Henry M. Jackson. After a series of consultations, the policy Watkins envisioned was set out with four fundamental tenets:

1. To eliminate laws that treated Native Americans as different from other Americans;
2. To dismantle the BIA, giving responsibility for their affairs to the tribes themselves, or if necessary transferring some of its duties to other federal and state agencies;
3. To end federal supervision of individual Indians; and
4. To cease federal guardianship responsibilities for Indian tribes and their resources.

In early June 1953, Senator Jackson introduced the termination bill in the Senate and Representative Harrison introduced it in the House. The defining moment for Watkins' legislation came on August 1, 1953, with passage of House concurrent resolution 108, which made termination the federal government's ongoing policy and established the first thirteen tribes to be targeted. Passage of the resolution did not, in itself, terminate any tribes, but it established that on a tribe by tribe basis, legislation would be enacted for those deemed sufficiently able to sustain themselves.

Watkins and his fellow legislators acted out of a belief that they needed to "fix the Indian problem" once and for all, and they believed that assimilation of the tribes into mainstream culture was their best hope for survival. It was a pressing problem, costing the government money at a time of huge war debt, and the means seemed to justify the wanted end.

At the time, many Indian tribes reacted against this proposed policy; in the afterword of her novel, The Night Watchman, Louise Erdrich quotes from the letters of her grandfather, Patrick Gourneau, who served as the chairman of the Turtle Mountain Band Chippewa Advisory Committee. At the nadir of Indians' power, the delegation by this committee pushed back, Erdrich writes, being the first Indian band to "mount a fierce defense and prevail." The Menominee, led by Ada Deer regained Federal recognition, details described in her memoir, Making a Difference: My fight for Native Rights and Social Justice.

By 1954, the policy was also being questioned at a conference of social scientists, primarily anthropologists, who concluded that the thought that "assimilation of the American Indian into the normal stream of American life is inevitable, that Indian tribes and communities will disappear" is completely unwarranted.

Though the legislation was supposed to give tribes input and obtain their consent, many tribes felt pressure to agree. For example, the Menominee received an appropriation of $8.5 million in 1951 to settle a claim of BIA mismanagement, but to receive the payment, were told to come up with a plan for termination. When speaking with the Klamath Tribes, Watkins invoked God's blessing upon termination and if that was not enough motivation, the three options proposed were clearly aimed at terminating the tribal relationships with the government: 1) Withdraw from the tribe and accept a cash settlement for any share they were due of tribal assets; 2) Remain in the tribe and help form a tribal association to manage the trust responsibilities instead of the federal government; or 3) Refuse a cash settlement and the government would appoint a guardian to manage the remaining assets of the tribe. Even the Osage Nation of Oklahoma was told by Commissioner of Indian Affairs, Dillon S. Myer, to prepare for termination and paying taxes because "'the best country in the world' needed financial support from all citizens to fight communists in North Korea".

When Watkins proposed termination of the Paiute Indian Tribe of Utah, despite the fact that they did not meet the established "readiness" benchmarks of policy, it contained no protections for the tribe's mineral rights. Only public outcry over loss of the mineral rights forced addition of protections for their oil into their termination bill. It was widely believed that Alaskan natives' rights to the Tongass National Forest had been forsaken in favor of corporate timber interests. The western Oregon terminations of the Siletz and Grand Ronde tribes were seen by settlers and state politicians as a means of releasing tribal natural resources as a no-cost means of improving local economies.

Even before Watkins lost his re-election bid, the policies he had pursued were proving to have disastrous effects on Native peoples, as anticipated. Tribes were cut off from services for education, health care, housing, sanitation and utility sources, and related resources. Termination directly caused decay within the tribe including poverty, alcoholism, high suicide rates, low educational achievement, disintegration of the family, poor housing, high dropout rates from school, trafficking of Indian women for prostitution, disproportionate numbers in penal institutions, increased infant mortality, decreased life expectancy, and loss of identity. In addition, the era of conformity was moving into the sixties and its calls for social change and a growing sensitivity to minority rights and the status of women.

=== Refugee Act of 1953 ===
Immigration was an important issue in the run up to the election in 1952. The McCarran-Walter Act, which President Harry Truman's administration had just passed, was criticized not only internally, but throughout Europe as a policy which maintained systematic racial and religious discrimination and was hampering immigration based on hostility and distrust of outsiders, rampant fear of Communism, and unfounded security claims. With the election of Dwight D. Eisenhower, rather than attempt to revise the McCarran Act, a decision was made to provide an emergency relief bill, which would be seen as a temporary program. On April 22, 1953, Eisenhower made a presentation to Congress outlining his main criteria for a refugee bill: sponsorship by a creditable citizen that the refugee had a job, housing, and would not become a ward of the state; proof that the refugee would be admitted back to his/her country of origin; complete background information for the last two years must be provided. Given this information, Eisenhower stressed that no discrimination based on race, religion or origin would prohibit visa issuance and that priority would be given to those refugees who had skills that were needed in the U.S. or who were family members of U.S. citizens.

On May 31, 1953, Watkins, as chairman of the Senate Immigration Subcommittee introduced a bill for the Refugee Relief Act, largely based on Eisenhower's proposal and recommendations. The two crucial elements of the bill were that it made refugee quotas distinct from visa quotas and it defined the terms "refugee" (a person facing persecution residing a non-communist country), "escapee" (a person facing persecution who currently resided in a community, country, or area dominated by communists) and "expelee" (a refugee of German heritage who had been removed from a Soviet-controlled country or area). Congressional hearings on the bill included representatives from Catholic, Jewish and Protestant organizations, but there was no consensus among them on whether the bill should be approved, or rejected.

The bill passed on August 7, 1953; was criticized for excluding many desirable refugees, excluding employers or associations from sponsoring refugees, excessive bureaucracy involved in obtaining security clearances, and an overall failure to bring in desperate refugees in anywhere near the authorized quotas; and was allowed to expire on December 31, 1956.

=== The Watkins Committee ===
Early in 1950, when Republican Senator Joseph McCarthy of Wisconsin began his anti-communist purges, he found a lot of support from the public at large and his colleagues. By 1952 however, some of his attacks had helped lead to defeat of Democratic opponents and even resulted in criticism from some of his own party for debasing the decorum required of a public official. By 1953, with the Republican sweep in the White House and legislatures his attacks had become an assault on his own party. On April 22, 1954, McCarthy opened hearings to investigate the security of the U.S. Army. Aired on national television, McCarthy badgered witnesses, ignored common courtesies, subverted parliamentary procedure, and negatively turned public opinion against himself and the government.

On June 11, 1954, Republican Senator Ralph Flanders of Vermont introduced a measure to strip McCarthy of all of his chairmanships. There were many in the Senate who believed that McCarthy should be curtailed, but there was no clear consensus on whether removing his chairmanships was warranted because of rules on seniority and proper protocol. Convinced by colleagues that censure would be easier to attain, on July 30, 1954, Flanders introduced a resolution calling for McCarthy's censure citing that McCarthy's behavior ran "contrary to senatorial traditions" and brought the whole body into disrepute. "It was not his breaches of etiquette, or of rules or sometimes even of laws which is so disturbing," but rather his overall pattern of behavior. Ultimately a "bill of particulars" listing 46 charges was added to the censure resolution.

Before McCarthy, there had only been five cases of censure in the history of the Senate, but his conduct had become so outrageous that it was felt something must be done. Vice President Richard Nixon, appointed a bi-partisan committee, headed by Watkins to review and determine whether censure was warranted. On August 5, 1954, the names of the committee members were released: Arthur Watkins (Republican of Utah), Frank Carlson (Republican of Kansas), Francis Case (Republican of South Dakota), Edwin C. Johnson (Democrat of Colorado), John Stennis (Democrat of Mississippi), and Sam Ervin (Democrat of North Carolina). The senators were hand-picked by William Knowland, the majority leader, and Lyndon B. Johnson, the minority leader because they were men who played by the rule, who had the respect of other senators, were neither liberal nor media hounds, and were not presidential contenders. They began meeting on August 31, 1954, for what would amount to 2 months of hearings.

The Watkins Committee divided the 46 counts into five categories: contempt of the Senate or a senatorial committee; encouragement of federal employees to break the law; receipt of classified documents from executive files; abuse of Senate colleagues; and abuse of military personnel. Watkins barred television cameras and media from the hearings, and insisted that McCarthy conform to Senate protocol. When McCarthy appeared before the committee and began badgering the committee members, Watkins expelled him from the procedures. Most of the charges were rejected either because they either fell into actions that had long been tolerated, or they were judged to have the potential to limit Senatorial investigations in the future. The two charges they finally decided to bring related to his failure to attend the Subcommittee on Rules and Administration, which had called him to testify in 1951 and 1952, and his abuse of then-Brigadier General Ralph W. Zwicker in the Army hearings of 1954. The Zwicker count was eventually dropped and one regarding his statements about the Watkins committee itself was added. One final attempt was made before the charges were brought to the full Senate to obtain an apology from McCarthy, but he refused.

The two counts on which the Senate ultimately voted were:

- (1) his refusal to appear before the Subcommittee on Privileges and Elections to answer questions about his personal character, and his general obstruction to the work of the panel during its investigation of him in 1951 and 1952; and
- (2) his "charging three members of the Select Committee with "deliberate deception" and "fraud" for failure to disqualify themselves; in stating to the press on November 4, 1954, that the special Senate session that was to begin November 8, 1954, was a "lynch-party"...

On December 2, 1954, the Senate voted to "condemn" McCarthy on both counts by a vote of 67 to 22. The Democrats present voted unanimously and the Republicans were split on whether condemnation should prevail. John F. Kennedy, who was hospitalized for back surgery, was not present at the vote and did not indicate specifically how he would have voted.

== After the Senate ==
McCarthy's anti-communist rhetoric was still popular with Utah's electorate and impacted Watkins' re-election bid in 1958. Former Utah Governor J. Bracken Lee took the opportunity to oppose Watkins for the senatorial nomination. Though Watkins won the Republican primary, Lee ran as an independent in the general election. This caused a split in the Republican vote and allowed Democrat Frank E. Moss to win the seat. Lee went on to a long career as mayor of Salt Lake City. Moss served three terms in the Senate, losing to Republican Orrin Hatch in 1976.

Following his defeat, Watkins was hired as consultant to Interior Secretary Fred Seaton, but left in 1960 to accept an appointment by Eisenhower on the Indian Claims Commission, becoming its chairman and subsequently its chief commissioner. In 1967 Watkins retired to write his memoirs and in 1969 published a book entitled Enough Rope, which detailed the work of the Watkins Committee and the censure of Joseph McCarthy.

== Death ==
Watkins died in Orem, Utah, on September 1, 1973, and was buried at Eastlawn Memorial Hills cemetery, Orem, Utah County, Utah, on September 3, 1973.

Party political offices
Preceded by Philo Farnsworth	Republican nominee for U.S. Senator from Utah (Class 1); 1946, 1952, 1958	Succeeded by Ernest L. Wilkinson
U.S. Senate
Preceded by Abe Murdock	U.S. senator (Class 1) from Utah; 1947 – 1959; Served alongside: Elbert D. Thomas, Wallace F. Bennett	Succeeded by Frank E. Moss
