= William Grant Bangerter =

American Mormon leader (1918–2010)

Wm. Grant Bangerter

Emeritus General Authority
- September 30, 1989 – April 18, 2010

Presidency of the First Quorum of the Seventy
- February 17, 1985 – September 30, 1989
- End reason: Granted general authority emeritus status

Presidency of the First Quorum of the Seventy
- September 30, 1978 – February 22, 1980
- End reason: Honorably released

First Quorum of the Seventy
- October 1, 1976 – September 30, 1989
- End reason: Granted general authority emeritus status

Assistant to the Quorum of the Twelve Apostles
- April 4, 1975 – October 1, 1976
- End reason: Position abolished

Personal details
- Born: William Grant Bangerter; June 8, 1918; Granger, Utah, U.S.
- Died: April 18, 2010 (aged 91); Salt Lake City, Utah, U.S.
- Resting place: Elysian Burial Gardens; 40.6714°N 111.8581°W
- Spouse(s): Mildred Lee Schwante (m. 1944; died 1952) Geraldine Hamblin
- Children: 11

William Grant Bangerter (June 8, 1918 – April 18, 2010) was a general authority of the Church of Jesus Christ of Latter-day Saints (LDS Church) from 1975 until his death.

== Biography ==
Bangerter was born in Granger, Utah. From 1939 to 1941, he served as an LDS Church missionary in Brazil. After his mission, he graduated from the University of Utah and became a building contractor.

In the LDS Church, Bangerter served as a bishop in Granger and was later president of the church's North Jordan Stake. From 1958 to 1963, he was president of the church's Brazilian Mission. After serving in Brazil, he became a regional representative. In 1974, he became the first president of the church's Portugal Lisbon Mission. In 1975, he became an Assistant to the Quorum of the Twelve Apostles. In 1976, when the position of Assistant to the Twelve was abolished, Bangerter became a member of the First Quorum of the Seventy. He twice served as a member of the Presidency of the Seventy (1978 to 1980, 1985 to 1989). In 1989, he was designated as an emeritus general authority and released from active duties.

From 1990 to 1993, Bangerter was president of the Jordan River Utah Temple. He later worked in the Mount Timpanogos Utah Temple and from 2003 until his death was a patriarch in the Alpine Utah West Stake.

=== Family ===
Bangerter was the father of 11 children. In 1944, he married Mildred Lee Schwantes, with whom he had four children. Mildred died of leukemia in 1952. In 1953, Bangerter married Geraldine Hamblin and they became the parents of seven children.

Bangerter was the elder brother of Norman H. Bangerter, who was governor of Utah from 1985 to 1993. He was the father of Julie B. Beck, who served as the general president of the church's Relief Society from 2007 to 2012.
