= 1982 United States Senate election in Utah =

- November 2, 1982
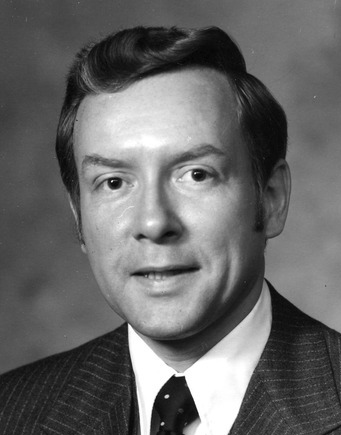

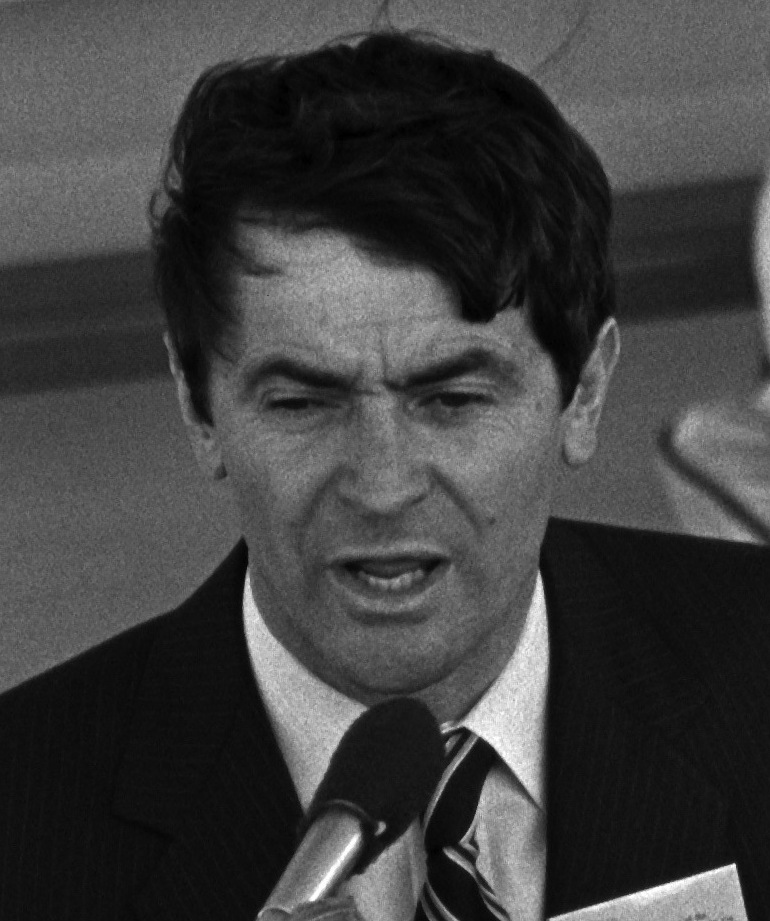
| Nominee | Orrin Hatch | Ted Wilson |
| Party | Republican | Democratic |
| Popular vote | 309,332 | 219,482 |
| Percentage | 58.28% | 41.35% |
- County results Hatch: 50–60% 60–70% 70–80% 80–90% Wilson: 50–60% 60–70%
U.S. senator before election
Orrin Hatch
Republican
Elected U.S. Senator
Orrin Hatch
Republican

The 1982 United States Senate election in Utah took place on November 2, 1982, concurrently with other elections to the United States Senate and United States House of Representatives, as well as various State and Local elections. Republican Orrin Hatch won re-election against Democratic challenger Ted Wilson. This is the last time a Democrat won more than 40% in a Utah Senate election.

== Major Candidates ==
=== Democratic ===
- Ted Wilson, Mayor of Salt Lake City

=== Republican ===
- Orrin Hatch, incumbent Senator

== Results ==
1982 United States Senate election in Utah
| Party | Candidate | Votes | % |
|---|---|---|---|
| Republican | Orrin Hatch (Incumbent) | 309,332 | 58.28% |
| Democratic | Ted Wilson | 219,482 | 41.35% |
| Libertarian | George Mercier | 1,035 | 0.19% |
| American | Lawrence R. Kauffman | 953 | 0.19% |
| Majority | | 89,850 | 16.93% |
| Turnout | | 530,802 | |
| Republican hold | | | |

== See also ==
- 1982 United States Senate elections
