= 1988 Utah gubernatorial election =

- November 8, 1988
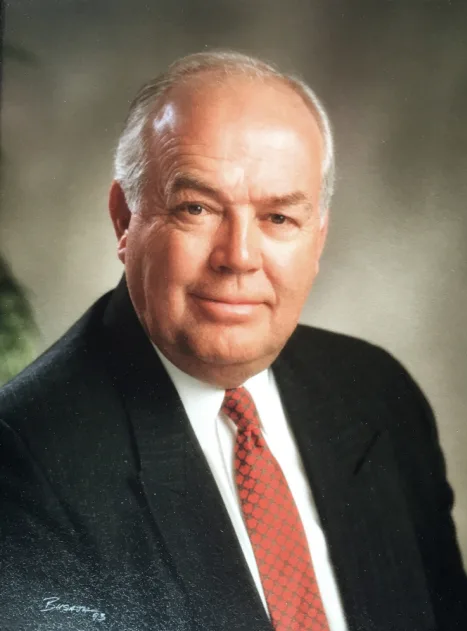

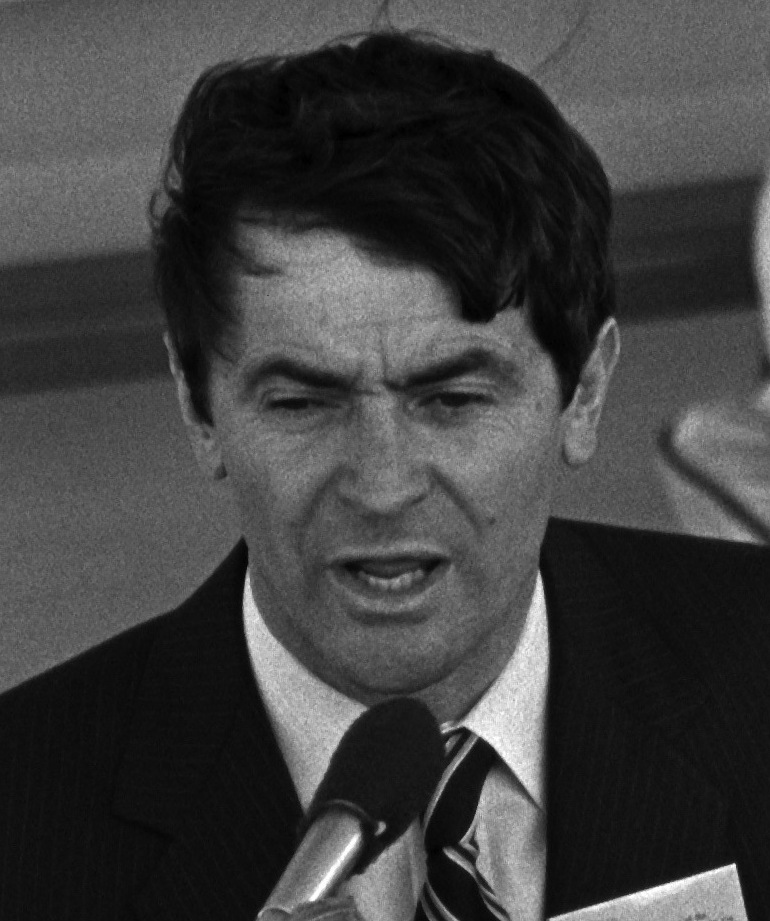

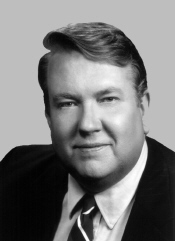
| Nominee | Norman H. Bangerter | Ted Wilson | Merrill Cook |
| Party | Republican | Democratic | Independent |
| Popular vote | 260,462 | 249,321 | 136,651 |
| Percentage | 40.13% | 38.41% | 21.05% |
- County results Bangerter: 30–40% 40–50% 50–60% 60–70% 70–80% Wilson: 30–40% 40–50% 50–60% 60–70% 70–80%
Governor before election
Norman H. Bangerter
Republican
Elected Governor
Norman H. Bangerter
Republican

The 1988 Utah gubernatorial election was held on November 8, 1988. Republican nominee and incumbent governor Norman H. Bangerter defeated Democratic nominee Ted Wilson and independent Merrill Cook with 40.13% of the vote. As of 2023, this is the closest a Democrat has come to winning the governorship in Utah since Scott M. Matheson left office in 1985.

== Background ==
Governor Bangerter consistently trailed in the polls behind Democrat Ted Wilson until near election day. This was due to his unpopular tax increases that spawned a protest movement against his policies, resulting in three tax ballot measures installed, and independent candidate Merrill Cook championing in support of them. Bangerter justified the increases due to the regional recession in Utah caused by declining energy commodity prices in 1986 to 1987, which caused mining employment to fall by 60%, and construction by 30%. Two major companies, Geneva Steel and Kennecott Copper, had to be closed temporarily. Combined with rapid raising school enrollments, Bangerter was forced to raise taxes to counter the declining state budget. Nevertheless, by election day, polls had shown that Bangerter had closed the near 20–30-point lead Wilson had just three weeks earlier, with previous governor Scott Matheson attributing it to his well received debate performance. In the early morning the day after the election, Bangerter was declared the winner with around 40% of the popular vote.

== Republican nomination ==
=== Candidates ===
==== Declared ====
- Norman H. Bangerter, incumbent governor
- Dean Samuels, teacher

==== Withdrawn ====
- Jon Huntsman Sr., industrialist and former White House Staff Secretary

=== Results ===
Bangerter defeated Samuels at the state convention on June 11 with over 70% of the vote and therefore avoided a primary.

Republican convention, 11 June 1988
| Party | Candidate | Votes | % |
|---|---|---|---|
| Republican | Norm Bangerter (incumbent) | 1,502 | 80.6% |
| Republican | W. Dean Samuels | 361 | 19.4% |
| Write-in | Merrill Cook | 1 | 0.1% |
| Total votes | | 1,864 | |

== Democratic nomination ==
=== Candidates ===
==== Declared ====
- Ted Wilson, former Mayor of Salt Lake City
- David E. Hewett, physician

=== Results ===
Wilson defeated Hewett at the state convention on June 25 with over 70% of the vote and therefore avoided a primary.

Democratic convention, 25 June 1988
| Party | Candidate | Votes | % |
|---|---|---|---|
| Democratic | Ted Wilson | 1,654 | 97.4% |
| Democratic | David E. Hewett | 44 | 2.6% |
| Total votes | | 1,698 | |

== American Party nomination ==
=== Candidates ===
==== Declared ====
- Arly H. Pedersen, National chairman
- Lawrence Ray Topham, perennial candidate

=== Results ===
Pedersen defeated Topham at the state convention on June 25 with over 70% of the vote and therefore avoided a primary.

American Party convention, 25 June 1988
| Party | Candidate | Votes | % |
|---|---|---|---|
| American | Arly H. Pedersen | 42 | 77.8% |
| American | Lawrence Rey Topham | 12 | 22.2% |
| Total votes | | 54 | |

== General election ==
=== Polling ===
| Poll source | Date(s) administered | Sample size | Margin of error | Norm Bangerter (R) | Ted Wilson (D) | Merrill Cook (I) | Other | Undecided |
|---|---|---|---|---|---|---|---|---|
| Dan Jones & Associates | April 19–21, 1988 | 904 | ± 3.0% | 28% | 56% | 8% | 1% | 7% |
| Deseret News/KSL | (May 3, 1988) | | | 27% | 52% | 6% | 1% | |
| Dan Jones & Associates | (June 27, 1988) | | | 30% | 49% | 11% | | |
| Dan Jones & Associates | July 26–28, 1988 | 905 | ± 3.2% | 31% | 50% | 12% | 1% | 7% |
| Dan Jones & Associates | (September 3, 1988) | | | 31% | 50% | 12% | | |
| Dan Jones & Associates | November 6, 1988 | | | 36% | 36% | 24% | | |

=== Candidates ===
- Ted Wilson, Democratic
- Norm Bangerter, Republican
- Arly H. Pedersen, American
- Merrill Cook, Independent
- Kitty K. Burton, Libertarian

=== Results ===
1988 Utah gubernatorial election
| Party | Candidate | Votes | % | ±% |
|---|---|---|---|---|
| Republican | Norman H. Bangerter (incumbent) | 260,462 | 40.13% | −15.75% |
| Democratic | Ted Wilson | 249,321 | 38.41% | −5.37% |
| Independent | Merrill Cook | 136,651 | 21.05% | |
| Libertarian | Kitty K. Burton | 1,661 | 0.26% | |
| American | Arly H. Pedersen | 1,019 | 0.16% | −0.19% |
| Total votes | | 649,114 | 100.00% | |
| Plurality | | 11,141 | 1.72% | |
| Republican hold | | Swing | -10.37% | |

=== Results by county ===
Salt Lake County voted for the losing candidate for the first time ever in a gubernatorial election. (Note: This would also subsequently occur in 2000 and 2004.)

| County | Norman H. Bangerter Republican | | Ted Wilson Democratic | | Merrill Cook Independent | | Kitty K. Burton Libertarian | | L. S. Brown American | | Margin (Note: Cook finished third in every county, so all margins are between Bangerter and Wilson.) | | Total votes cast |
| County | # | % | # | % | # | % | # | % | # | % | # | % | Total votes cast |
|---|---|---|---|---|---|---|---|---|---|---|---|---|---|
| Beaver | 869 | 41.17% | 998 | 47.28% | 240 | 11.37% | 3 | 0.14% | 1 | 0.05% | -129 | -6.11% | 2,111 |
| Box Elder | 7,880 | 48.97% | 5,421 | 33.69% | 2,753 | 17.11% | 18 | 0.11% | 21 | 0.13% | 2,459 | 15.28% | 16,093 |
| Cache | 13,916 | 49.71% | 10,326 | 36.89% | 3,610 | 12.90% | 89 | 0.32% | 54 | 0.19% | 3,590 | 12.82% | 27,995 |
| Carbon | 1,265 | 14.76% | 6,102 | 71.20% | 1,187 | 13.85% | 13 | 0.15% | 3 | 0.04% | -4,837 | -56.44% | 8,570 |
| Daggett | 171 | 41.20% | 189 | 45.54% | 53 | 12.77% | 2 | 0.48% | 0 | 0.00% | -18 | -4.34% | 415 |
| Davis | 29,729 | 43.37% | 21,407 | 31.23% | 17,144 | 25.01% | 163 | 0.24% | 104 | 0.15% | 8,322 | 12.14% | 68,547 |
| Duchesne | 1,471 | 33.60% | 1,597 | 36.48% | 1,296 | 29.60% | 4 | 0.09% | 10 | 0.23% | -126 | -2.88% | 4,378 |
| Emery | 1,397 | 33.66% | 2,185 | 52.65% | 560 | 13.49% | 3 | 0.07% | 5 | 0.12% | -788 | -18.99% | 4,150 |
| Garfield | 1,310 | 70.70% | 362 | 19.54% | 177 | 9.55% | 2 | 0.11% | 2 | 0.11% | 948 | 51.16% | 1,853 |
| Grand | 1,049 | 32.71% | 1,507 | 46.99% | 636 | 19.83% | 8 | 0.25% | 7 | 0.22% | -458 | -14.28% | 3,207 |
| Iron | 4,361 | 56.05% | 2,550 | 32.78% | 840 | 10.80% | 5 | 0.06% | 24 | 0.31% | 1,811 | 23.28% | 7,780 |
| Juab | 928 | 36.74% | 1,158 | 45.84% | 438 | 17.34% | 0 | 0.00% | 2 | 0.08% | -230 | -9.11% | 2,526 |
| Kane | 1,499 | 67.37% | 491 | 22.07% | 222 | 9.98% | 11 | 0.49% | 2 | 0.09% | 1,008 | 45.30% | 2,225 |
| Millard | 2,030 | 43.61% | 1,529 | 32.85% | 1,088 | 23.37% | 3 | 0.06% | 5 | 0.11% | 501 | 10.76% | 4,655 |
| Morgan | 1,066 | 41.64% | 818 | 31.95% | 675 | 26.37% | 0 | 0.00% | 1 | 0.04% | 248 | 9.69% | 2,560 |
| Piute | 364 | 53.93% | 247 | 36.59% | 63 | 9.33% | 0 | 0.00% | 1 | 0.15% | 117 | 17.33% | 675 |
| Rich | 408 | 47.11% | 315 | 36.37% | 140 | 16.17% | 3 | 0.35% | 0 | 0.00% | 93 | 10.74% | 866 |
| Salt Lake | 97,642 | 35.05% | 120,102 | 43.11% | 59,562 | 21.38% | 819 | 0.29% | 482 | 0.17% | -22,460 | -8.06% | 278,607 |
| San Juan | 1,658 | 43.80% | 1,752 | 46.29% | 353 | 9.33% | 11 | 0.29% | 11 | 0.29% | -94 | -2.48% | 3,785 |
| Sanpete | 3,000 | 45.79% | 2,384 | 36.39% | 1,141 | 17.41% | 18 | 0.27% | 9 | 0.14% | 616 | 9.40% | 6,552 |
| Sevier | 2,831 | 45.56% | 1,910 | 30.74% | 1,439 | 23.16% | 15 | 0.24% | 19 | 0.31% | 921 | 14.82% | 6,214 |
| Summit | 2,120 | 33.15 | 3,129 | 48.92% | 1,132 | 17.70% | 12 | 0.19% | 3 | 0.05% | -1,009 | -15.78% | 6,396 |
| Tooele | 3,113 | 32.18% | 4,724 | 48.83% | 1,812 | 18.73% | 21 | 0.22% | 5 | 0.05% | -1,611 | -16.65% | 9,675 |
| Uintah | 2,698 | 37.44% | 2,368 | 32.86% | 2,118 | 29.39% | 15 | 0.21% | 8 | 0.11% | 330 | 4.58% | 7,207 |
| Utah | 44,329 | 50.26% | 26,129 | 29.63% | 17,407 | 19.74% | 199 | 0.23% | 131 | 0.15% | 18,200 | 20.64% | 88,195 |
| Wasatch | 1,624 | 40.95% | 1,654 | 41.70% | 677 | 17.07% | 4 | 0.10% | 7 | 0.18% | -30 | -0.76% | 3,966 |
| Washington | 9,588 | 57.99% | 4,203 | 25.42% | 2,658 | 16.08% | 57 | 0.34% | 27 | 0.16% | 5,385 | 32.57% | 16,533 |
| Wayne | 692 | 61.40% | 353 | 31.32% | 80 | 7.10% | 2 | 0.18% | 0 | 0.00% | 339 | 30.08% | 1,127 |
| Weber | 21,454 | 34.46% | 23,411 | 37.61% | 17,150 | 27.55% | 161 | 0.26% | 75 | 0.12% | -1,957 | -3.14% | 62,251 |
| Total | 260,462 | 40.13% | 249,321 | 38.41% | 136,651 | 21.05% | 1,661 | 0.26% | 1,019 | 0.16% | 11,141 | 1.72% | 649,114 |

==== Counties that flipped from Republican to Democratic ====
- Daggett
- Duchesne
- Grand
- Juab
- Salt Lake
- San Juan
- Wasatch
- Weber

== Aftermath ==
Governor Bangerter descended from his hotel room around 3:15 am, the morning after election day, to greet reporters and a small group of 40 "cheerful" supporters in the hotel's banquet room upon receiving a concession call from Ted Wilson. In a speech, Bangerter declared that "This morning we start bringing the state back together on an agenda that will move us into the 1990s."

All three of the tax protest ballot initiatives were defeated, with their biggest supporter, independent candidate Merrill Cook, stating: "I'm conceding the race, but I'm not conceding the fight." Cook would run for governor as an independent again in the 1992 gubernatorial election.

Democrats, who thought Wilson would win easily, were astounded by the stunning upset, and had trouble explaining the loss. Former Democratic governor Scott Matheson was asked why he thought Wilson lost: "That is an intriguing question we will be talking about for years. There are so many factors, the matter of a strong independent candidate, the presence of the tax initiatives which took attention away from the regular races. But we can't dismiss the fact we live in a strong Republican state where it is difficult for Democrats to win and that Ted Wilson was running against an incumbent who had the advantage of using the power of incumbency to make his case to the people."

Bangerter would later announce in November 1990 that he would not seek a third term and would retire to private life.

== Bibliography ==
- Gubernatorial Elections, 1787–1997. Washington, D.C.: Congressional Quarterly Inc. 1998. ISBN 1-56802-396-0.
- The World Almanac and Book of Facts, 1989. New York, NY: Pharos Books. 1988. ISBN 0-88687-361-4.
