= Conrad B. Harrison =

29th Mayor of Salt Lake City

In office
- 1974 – 1976
- Predecessor: Jake Garn
- Successor: Ted Wilson
- Political party: Independent

Personal details
- Born: Conrad Bullen Harrison; July 15, 1911; Logan, Utah, U.S.
- Died: February 12, 2008 (aged 96); Salt Lake City, Utah, U.S.
- Resting place: Salt Lake City Cemetery; 40.777°N 111.858°W
- Education: Bachelor's degree
- Alma mater: Utah State University
- Occupation: Journalist
- Employer: Logan Herald Journal; Salt Lake Telegram; Deseret News
- Organization: Member of the Mormon Tabernacle Choir; Member of the Utah Symphony Orchestra Board
- Notable works: Five Thousand Concerts: A Commemorative History of the Utah Symphony
- Spouse(s): Ruth Annie Layton
- Children: 5
- Parents: Antrim Byrd Harrison; Pearl Bullen

Conrad Bullen Harrison (July 15, 1911 – February 12, 2008) was the 28th mayor of Salt Lake City, Utah, United States, from 1974 to 1976. He was appointed as a replacement for Jake Garn, who was elected to the United States Senate in 1974.

== Personal life ==
Conrad Harrison was born on July 15, 1911, in Logan, Utah. He graduated from Logan High School in 1929. He was editor of the Logan High Grizzly newspaper.

He earned a bachelor's degree from Utah State University in 1937 where he edited the Student Life newspaper. He married Ruth Annie Layton in 1935 and together had five children.

Harrison was a journalist covering public affairs, sports and music. He worked for the Logan Herald Journal from May 1934 to October 1938 as the managing editor. He later worked at the Salt Lake Telegram, and the Deseret News from 1941 to 1960 where he started as a sports reporter and editor before he transferred to the city desk covering local government. He also sold real estate.

He died on February 12, 2008, at his home in Salt Lake City, Utah, of causes incident to age. Funeral services were held on Thursday, February 21, 2008, in Salt Lake City, Utah; he was buried at the Salt Lake City Cemetery.

Harrison was a Latter-day Saint. He served for a time on the High Council of the Parley's Stake on the east side of Salt Lake City.

=== Civic organizations ===
Conrad Harrison was a member of the Mormon Tabernacle Choir. He also served on the Utah Symphony Orchestra Board when the board recommended that the Utah Symphony hire Maurice Abravanel as its conductor.

He also participated in:

- Imperial Glee Club in Logan
- Orpheus Club of Salt Lake
- Deseret News Troubadours group.
- Utah State Bowling Proprietors Association, once serving as its executive secretary
- Utah State Institution of Fine Arts, once served as its chairman
- Utah Concerts Council as a charter member
- Bonneville Knife and Fork Club, once serving as its executive director

His papers are a part of the Manuscript Division of the Marriott Library at the University of Utah.

== Politics and Local Government ==
In 1960, he was appointed to become the water commissioner by Mayor J. Bracken Lee. Harrison was elected to the City Commission in 1962, 1966 and 1970.

Harrison ran unsuccessfully for mayor against Jake Garn in 1972. Harrison was eventually appointed as Jake Garn's replacement as mayor in 1975.

Harrison ran against political newcomer Ted Wilson in the 1975 election for Salt Lake City Mayor, but lost. After his mayoral service, he helped Governor Scott Matheson with some government projects.

== Publications ==
Five Thousand Concerts: A Commemorative History of the Utah Symphony, (Salt Lake City: Utah Symphony Society, 1986)

== Notes ==
Political offices
Preceded by Jake Garn	Mayor of Salt Lake City; 1974–1976	Succeeded by Ted Wilson
