= 1976 United States Senate election in Utah =

- November 2, 1976
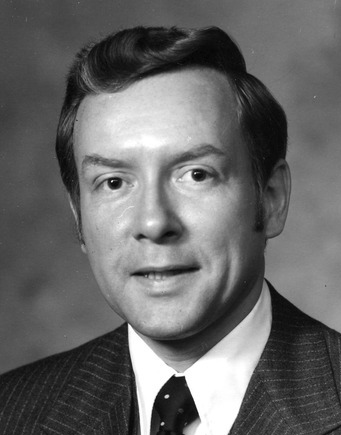

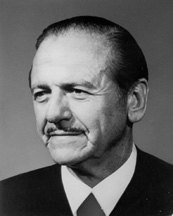
Nominee	Orrin Hatch	Frank Moss
Party	Republican	Democratic
Popular vote	290,221	241,948
Percentage	53.73%	44.80%
- County results Hatch: 40–50% 50–60% 60–70% 70–80% Moss: 50–60% 60–70%
U.S. senator before election
Frank Moss
Democratic
Elected U.S. Senator
Orrin Hatch
Republican

The 1976 United States Senate election in Utah took place on November 2, 1976. Incumbent Democratic U.S. Senator Frank Moss ran for re-election to a fourth term but was defeated by his Republican opponent Orrin Hatch. This is the last time a senator from Utah lost re-election.

Hatch eventually became the longest-serving Republican senator, having been elected for seven terms before retiring during the 2018 election. This record was overtaken by Chuck Grassley of Iowa in 2022.

== Major candidates ==
=== Democratic ===
- Frank Moss, incumbent U.S. senator since 1959

=== Republican ===
- Jack Carlson, assistant secretary of interior for energy and minerals
- Orrin Hatch, attorney
- Sherman P. Lloyd, former U.S. representative

== Results ==
1976 United States Senate election in Utah
Party	Candidate	Votes	%
Republican	Orrin Hatch	290,221	53.73%
Democratic	Frank Moss (incumbent)	241,948	44.80%
Independent American	George M. Batchelor	4,913	0.91%
Libertarian	Steve Trotter	3,026	0.56%
Majority		48,273	8.93%
Turnout		540,108	
Republican gain from Democratic			

== See also ==
- 1976 United States Senate elections

== Bibliography ==
- Congressional Elections, 1946-1996. Washington, D.C.: Congressional Quarterly Inc. 1998. ISBN 1-56802-248-4.
- Scammon, Richard M.; McGillivray, Alice V. (1977). America Votes 12: a handbook of contemporary American election statistics, 1976. Washington, D.C.: Elections Research Center.
