= Palmer DePaulis =

American politician (born 1945)

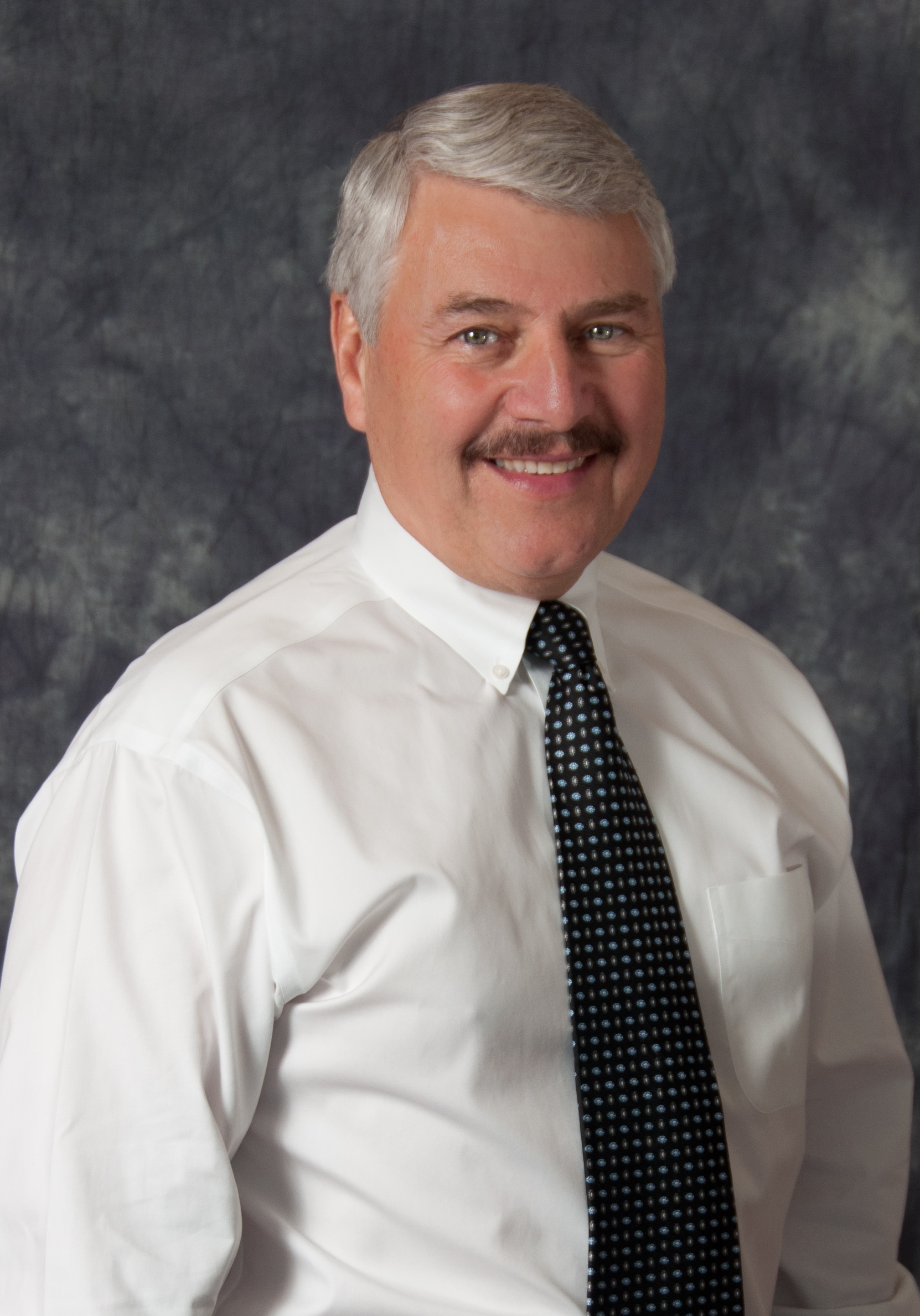

31st Mayor of Salt Lake City
- In office 1985–1992
- Preceded by: Ted Wilson
- Succeeded by: Deedee Corradini

Personal details
- Born: 1945 (age 79–80)
- Political party: Democratic
- Spouse: Jeanne M. (Laufenburg) DePaulis
- Children: Patrick J. DePaulis & Margaret (Megan) J. DePaulis
- Profession: Politician

Palmer DePaulis (born 1945) is an American politician in the state of Utah. He was a former mayor of Salt Lake City and held several high-level positions in the Utah state government. He is a member of the Democratic Party.

== Career ==
DePaulis was born in 1945 and served as a Salt Lake City Councilman before becoming the 31st mayor of Salt Lake City from 1985 to 1991. He was the first Roman Catholic mayor of Salt Lake City. He subsequently served as Chief of Staff to Utah Attorney General Jan Graham, as a Commissioner at the Utah State Tax Commission, and as Executive Director of the Department of Community and Culture. In June 2010, Governor Gary Herbert appointed him as Executive Director of the Department of Human Services.

While serving as the Executive Director of the Utah Department of Community and Culture, under then Governor Jon M. Huntsman Jr., a housing development to serve chronically homeless Utahns was named "Palmer Court" to recognize Depaulis's decades long involvement in homeless issues.

In 2014 DePaulis was presented with Career Humanitarian Award at Utah Philanthropy Day by Intermountain Catholic.

DePaulis is credited for his efforts to and building a team that was responsible for saving the historic Salt Lake City & County Building while mayor of Salt Lake City.

== See also ==
- List of mayors of Salt Lake City

Political offices
Preceded by Ted Wilson	Mayor of Salt Lake City; 1985–1992	Succeeded by Deedee Corradini
