= 1958 United States Senate election in Utah =

- November 4, 1958
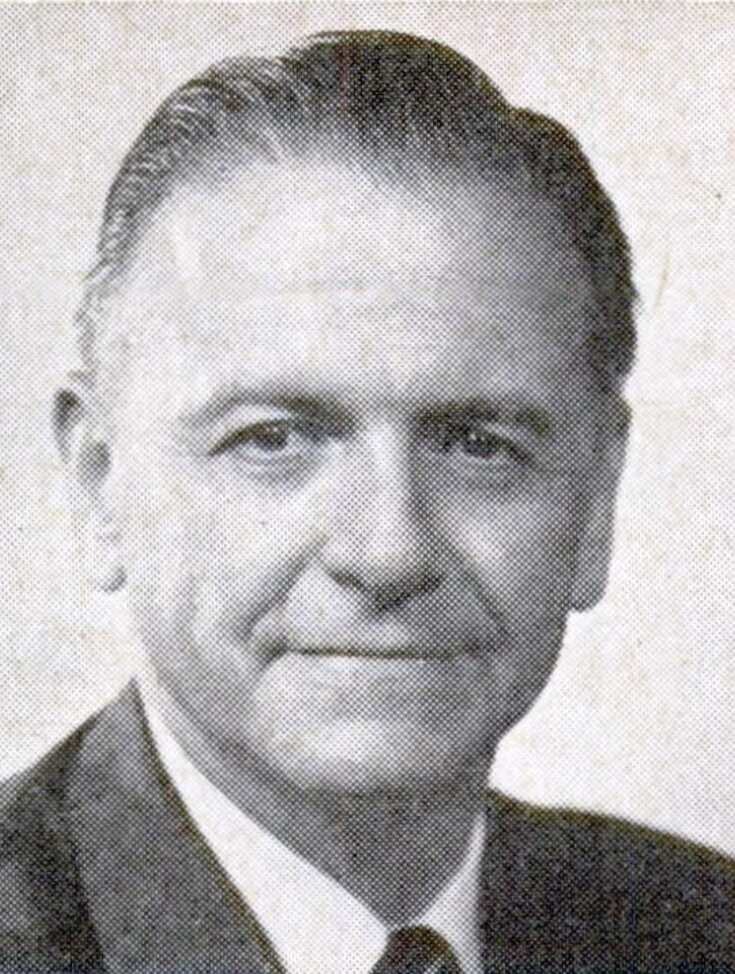

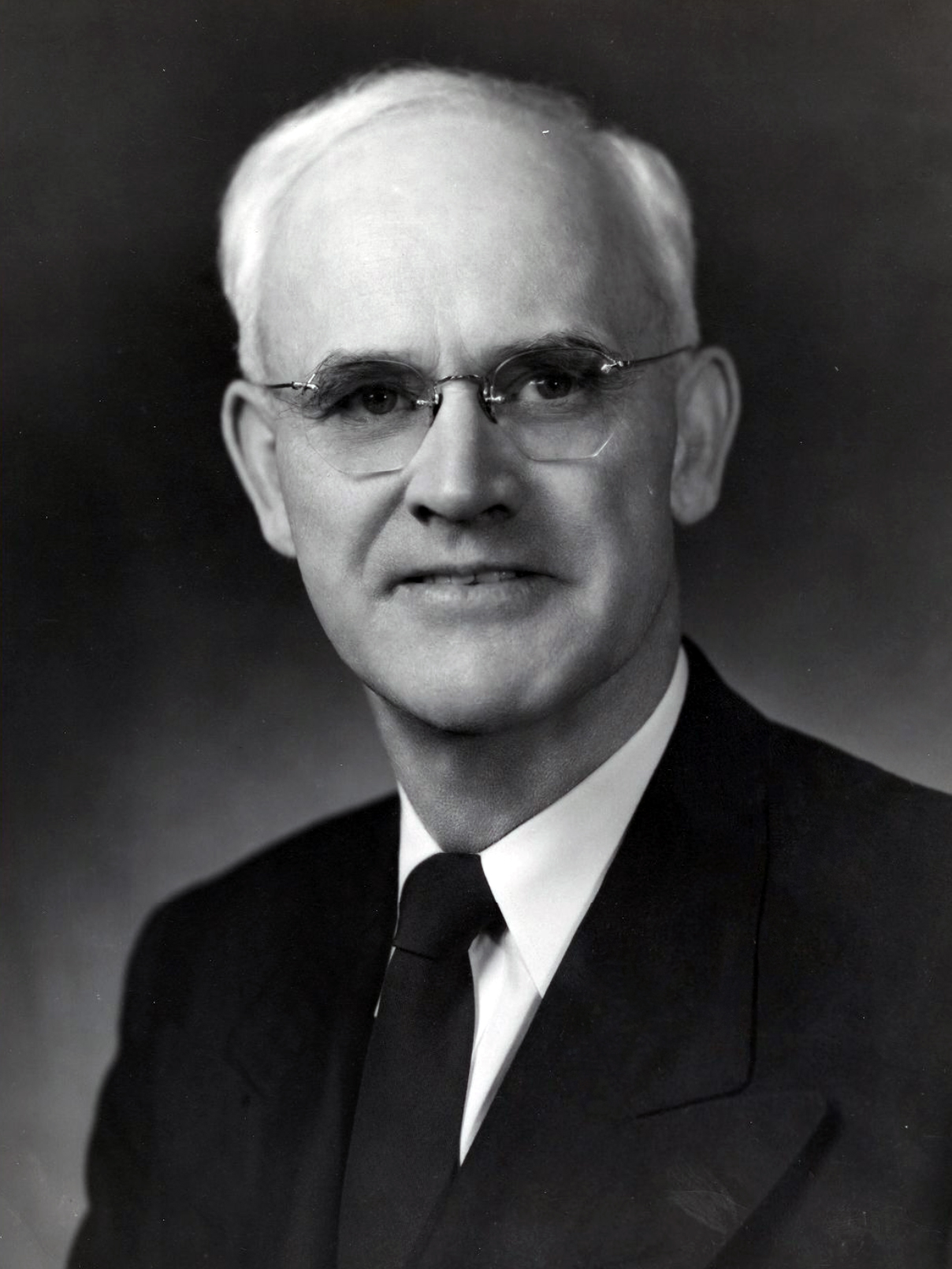

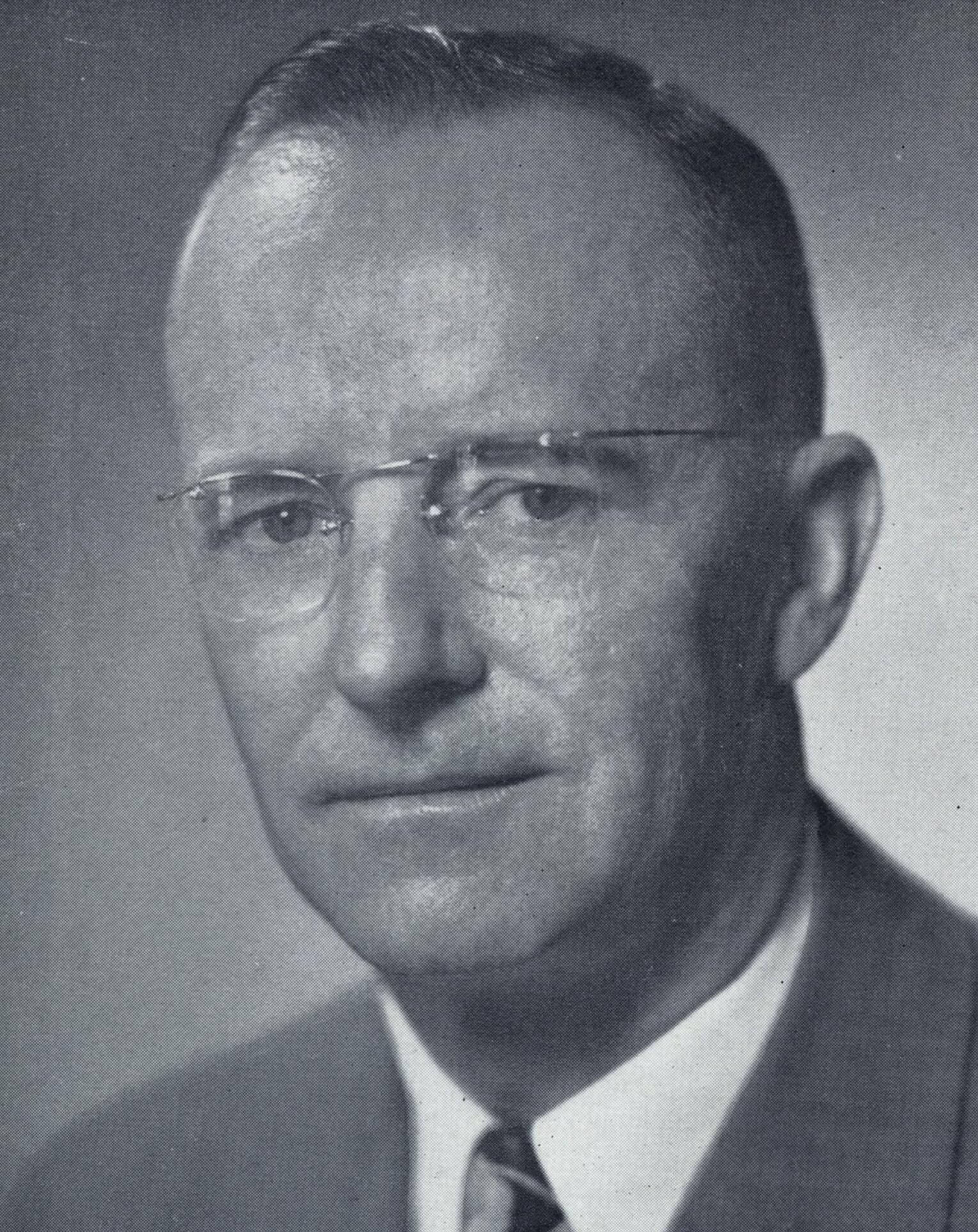
Nominee	Frank Moss	Arthur V. Watkins	J. Bracken Lee
Party	Democratic	Republican	Independent
Popular vote	112,827	101,471	77,013
Percentage	38.73%	34.83%	26.44%
- County results Moss: 30–40% 40–50% 50–60% Watkins: 30–40% 40–50% 50–60% Lee: 40–50% 60–70%
U.S. senator before election
Arthur V. Watkins
Republican
Elected U.S. Senator
Frank Moss
Democratic

The 1958 United States Senate election in Utah was held on November 4, 1958.

Incumbent Senator Arthur V. Watkins was defeated by Salt Lake County Attorney Frank Moss in a three-way race that also included former Governor J. Bracken Lee running as an independent. This was one of a record twelve Senate seats Democrats gained from the Republican Party in 1958. Even in such a strong year for Democrats, Moss's victory in Utah was seen as a major upset.

== Background ==
Utah at this time was seen as a safely Republican seat. Utah had not elected a Democratic Governor or United States Senator since 1944. The state voted for Republican President Dwight D. Eisenhower by 17 points in 1952 and 29 points in 1956. It was one of only three states in the West which had trended towards Eisenhower in 1956, and the Republicans swept all congressional seats and state offices by substantial margins.

By June 1958, the state was considered the only "safe Republican" area in the entire nation. In the face of the national Democratic surge, one Republican expert was quoted, "I haven't had any bad reports from [Utah] — recently."

== Republican primary ==
=== Candidates ===
- Carvel Mattsson, attorney from Richfield
- Arthur Vivian Watkins, incumbent Senator since 1947

=== Results ===
Watkins easily won re-nomination by the Republican Party for a third term. Mattison carried only his home county of Sevier along with bordering Piute and Wayne Counties.

1958 Republican U.S. Senate primary 97% of precincts reporting
Party	Candidate	Votes	%
Republican	Arthur V. Watkins (incumbent)	38,970	67.87%
Republican	Carvel Mattsson	18,451	32.13%
Total votes		57,421	97.40%

== Democratic primary ==
=== Candidates ===
- Frank Moss, Salt Lake County District Attorney
- Brigham E. Roberts, Salt Lake City attorney and Democratic National Committeeman

=== Results ===
1958 Democratic U.S. Senate primary 97% of precincts reporting
Party	Candidate	Votes	%
Democratic	Frank Moss	35,582	59.08%
Democratic	Brigham E. Roberts	24,641	40.92%
Total votes		60,223	97.40%

== General election ==
=== Candidates ===
- J. Bracken Lee, former Governor of Utah (Independent)
- Frank Moss, Salt Lake County District Attorney (Democratic)
- Arthur Vivian Watkins, incumbent Senator since 1947 (Republican)

=== Campaign ===
Senator Watkins made several key errors in the months and years preceding his defeat. He supported a strengthening of the Robinson–Patman Act, which angered business interests in the state and led the Utah Association of Petroleum Retailed to back Moss. The metal mining industry, which is a key part of the Utah economy, also grew dissatisfied with Watkins after Congress failed to pass favorable legislation. He also angered some rural voters by failing to take a side in a reclamation project that pitted development interests in Carbon County against those in Sanpete County.

Perhaps most importantly, Watkins angered conservative and right-wing voters within his own party by leading the committee which voted for the censure of anti-communist Senator Joseph McCarthy.

In the general election, Lee campaigned on the repeal of the federal income tax and a general reduction of taxes. He limited his previous criticisms of the Eisenhower administration and of the United Nations, though he continued to criticize foreign aid and federal spending in general. For his own part, Watkins campaigned on the issue of seniority. He claimed that if re-elected, he would be appointed to the powerful Senate Appropriations Committee. Lee responded by reminding Watkins that his predecessor, Senator Abe Murdock, was on this committee during his first and only term. Moss noted that seniority, even on a powerful committee, would mean little so long as Watkins's Republican Party remained the minority in the Senate.

Moss gained support by contrasting himself to the much older Watkins and Lee in a series of public appearances. At one such event late in the campaign at the University of Utah, Lee said that all politicians were corrupt. Given Lee's own long career in politics and many electoral campaigns, the crowd laughed. As Lee's campaign began to decline and Moss's surged, a number of high-profile national Democratic leaders came to Utah to campaign. They included Senators Lyndon Baines Johnson, George Smathers, and Warren Magnuson. The Moss campaign brought in AFL-CIO lobbyist Esther Peterson and local communications executive George C. Hatch to provide strategic advice and communications expertise.

In the final weeks of the race, the Moss campaign ran a double-pronged strategy: boosting Lee's appeal to Republican voters while drawing away his Democratic supporters. They first hosted a "Let's Sack Brack" rally featuring newly elected Senator Edmund Muskie and Congressman John E. Moss of California. As Lee gained attention as the outsider candidate, he began to attack both parties equally as a single "machine." Watkins turned his attention to Lee and intensified his attacks. In the final weeks of the campaign, the Democrats carried out an intensive phone-banking operation, calling potential Lee supporters to claim that Moss was the only candidate who could unseat Watkins.

Watkins polled ahead for most of the campaign, but in the final weeks polls were published showing both Moss and Lee in the lead. Ultimately, his victory was credited to the presence of Lee in the race, which split Republican voters, and his own campaign's youthful energy.

=== Results ===
General election results
Party	Candidate	Votes	%	±%
Democratic	Frank Moss	112,827	38.73%	▼7.01
Republican	Arthur V. Watkins (incumbent)	101,471	34.83%	▼19.43
Independent	J. Bracken Lee	77,013	26.44%	N/A
Total votes		291,311	100.00%	N/A
Democratic gain from Republican				

==== Results by county ====
County	Frank Moss Democratic		Arthur V. Watkins Republican		J. Bracken Lee Independent		Margin		Total votes cast
County	#	%	#	%	#	%	#	%	Total votes cast
Beaver	882	43.11%	501	24.49%	663	32.40%	219	10.71%	2,046
Box Elder	2,667	35.85%	3,008	40.43%	1,765	23.72%	-341	-4.58%	7,440
Cache	4,043	33.78%	5,234	43.73%	2,693	22.50%	-1,191	-9.95%	11,970
Carbon	4,421	57.05%	849	10.95%	2,480	32.00%	1,941	25.05%	7,750
Daggett	119	45.95%	82	31.66%	58	22.39%	37	14.29%	259
Davis	5,798	36.19%	6,661	41.58%	3,561	22.23%	-863	-5.39%	16,020
Duchesne	733	30.40%	1,052	43.63%	626	25.96%	-319	-13.23%	2,411
Emery	991	40.02%	675	27.26%	810	32.71%	181	7.31%	2,476
Garfield	277	20.94%	636	48.07%	410	30.99%	-226	-17.08%	1,323
Grand	286	17.51%	292	17.88%	1,055	64.61%	-763	-46.73%	1,633
Iron	1,351	30.18%	1,718	38.38%	1,407	31.43%	-311	-6.95%	4,476
Juab	1,115	46.17%	747	30.93%	553	22.90%	368	15.24%	2,415
Kane	154	15.29%	586	58.19%	267	26.51%	-319	-31.68%	1,007
Millard	1,085	31.25%	1,219	35.11%	1,168	33.64%	-51	-1.47%	3,472
Morgan	470	38.12%	536	43.47%	227	18.41%	-66	-5.35%	1,233
Piute	174	26.28%	281	42.45%	207	31.27%	-74	-11.18%	662
Rich	211	29.14%	271	37.43%	242	33.43%	-29	-4.00%	724
Salt Lake	47,750	37.78%	39,863	31.54%	38,767	30.67%	7887	6.24%	126,380
San Juan	614	34.32%	708	39.58%	467	26.10%	-94	-5.26%	1,789
Sanpete	1,839	35.04%	2,066	39.36%	1,344	25.60%	-227	-4.32%	5,249
Sevier	1,054	25.07%	1,467	34.89%	1,684	40.05%	-217	-5.16%	4,205
Summit	916	35.08%	928	35.54%	767	29.38%	-12	-0.46%	2,611
Tooele	2,364	45.24%	1,567	29.99%	1,294	24.77%	797	15.25%	5,225
Uintah	857	24.62%	1,861	53.46%	763	21.92%	-1,004	-28.84%	3,481
Utah	13,797	40.69%	13,660	40.28%	6,452	19.03%	137	0.41%	33,909
Wasatch	994	42.86%	812	35.02%	513	22.12%	182	7.84%	2,319
Washington	931	26.04%	1,883	52.67%	761	21.29%	-952	-26.63%	3,575
Wayne	272	35.42%	289	37.63%	207	26.95%	-17	-2.21%	768
Weber	16,662	48.32%	12,019	34.85%	5,802	16.83%	4643	13.47%	34,483
Totals	112,827	38.73%	101,471	34.83%	77,013	26.44%	11,356	3.90%	291,311

== See also ==
- 1958 United States Senate elections
