= 1964 United States Senate election in Utah =

- November 3, 1964
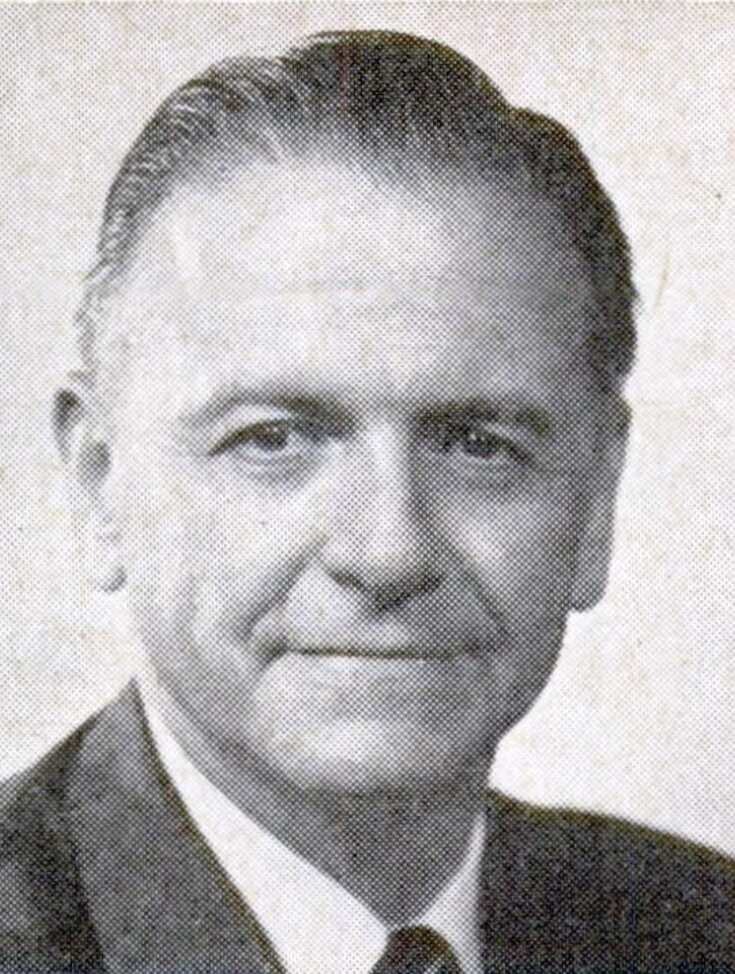

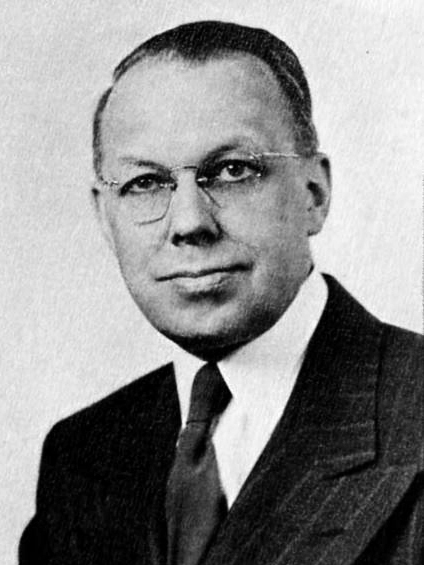
| Nominee | Frank Moss | Ernest L. Wilkinson |
| Party | Democratic | Republican |
| Popular vote | 227,822 | 169,562 |
| Percentage | 57.33% | 42.67% |
- County results Moss: 50–60% 60–70% 70–80% Wilkinson: 50–60% 60–70%
U.S. senator before election
Frank Moss
Democratic
Elected U.S. Senator
Frank Moss
Democratic

The 1964 United States Senate election in Utah was held on November 3, 1964.

Incumbent Democratic Senator Frank Moss was re-elected to a second term in office, defeating Republican Ernest L. Wilkinson, the president of Brigham Young University.

== Republican primary ==
=== Candidates ===
- Sherman P. Lloyd, U.S. Representative from Salt Lake City
- Ernest L. Wilkinson, President of Brigham Young University since 1951

=== Results ===
1964 Republican U.S. Senate primary
| Party | Candidate | Votes | % |
|---|---|---|---|
| Republican | Ernest L. Wilkinson | 61,167 | 50.73% |
| Republican | Sherman P. Lloyd | 59,398 | 49.27% |
| Total votes | | 120,565 | 100.00% |

== General election ==
=== Candidates ===
- Ernest L. Wilkinson, President of BYU (Republican)
- Frank Moss, incumbent Senator since 1959 (Democratic)

=== Results ===
1964 U.S. Senate election in Utah
| Party | Candidate | Votes | % | ±% |
|---|---|---|---|---|
| Democratic | Frank Moss (incumbent) | 227,822 | 57.33% | ▲18.60 |
| Republican | Ernest L. Wilkinson | 169,562 | 42.67% | ▲7.84 |
| Total votes | | 397,384 | 100.00% | N/A |
| Democratic hold | | | | |

== See also ==
- 1964 United States Senate elections
