= Women's Ski Jumping USA =

Women's Ski Jumping USA is a non-profit organization responsible for the operational funding and support of the U.S. Women's ski jumping team. The organization administers funding for coaching, travel, training, equipment and development programs.

Each year, based on established criteria, the top women in the United States are named to the VISA women's ski jumping team. Working with the United States Ski and Snowboard Association, Women's Ski Jumping USA prepares the top women in ski jumping for national and international competition.

== Mission ==
The mission of Women's Ski Jumping USA is to administer a successful and sustainable women's team and to grow participation in the U.S. women's ski jumping program by facilitating national development efforts that produce the best women ski jumpers in the world. WSJ USA aims to remain an influential voice in advocating equality for women in sport.

== History ==
Women's Ski Jumping USA was incorporated in 2003 as a 501c3 non-profit based in Park City, Utah. It was created with the goal of providing leadership and financial support to the rising number of accomplished women ski jumpers. The mission has always involved attaining equality for women in the sport, allowing them to compete alongside their male counterparts at the highest levels, including the Olympic Winter Games. The VISA Women's Ski Jumping USA team has experienced notable success with back-to-back FIS Nations Cup victories in 2012 and 2013 and two FIS World Champion athletes; Lindsey Van (2009) and Sarah Hendrickson (2013).

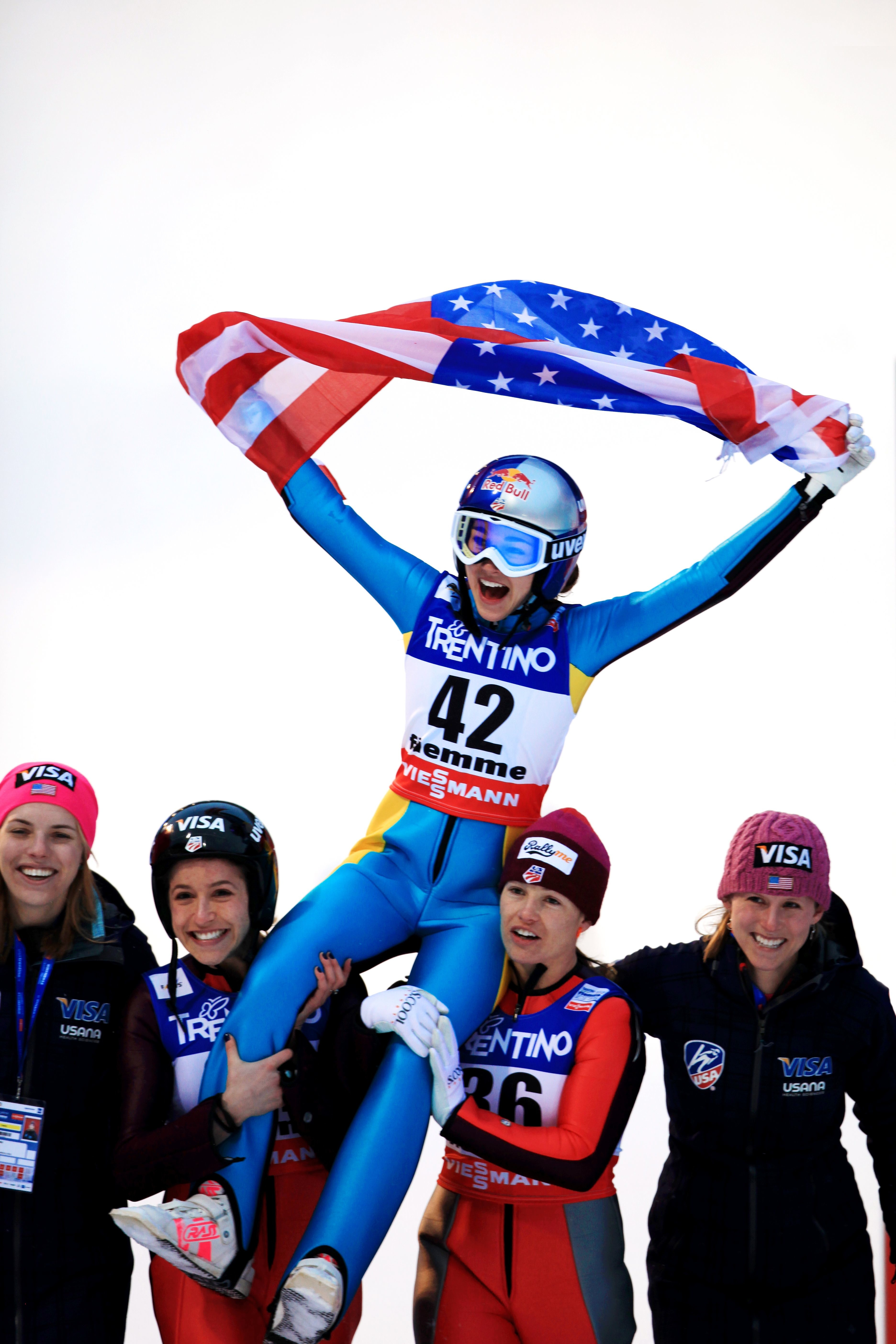
Team members celebrate with Sarah Hendrickson after her 2013 World Championship win.

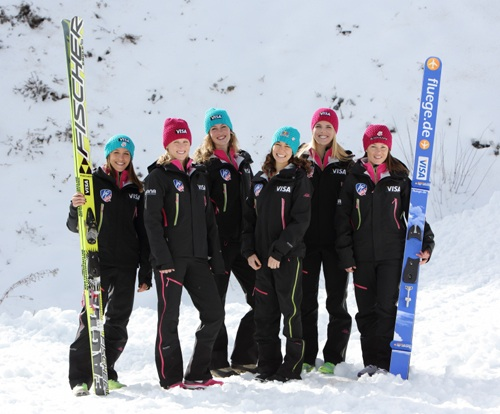
2014 team members: Jessica Jerome, Alissa Johnson, Nina Lussi, Sarah Hendrickson, Abby Ringquist, Lindsey Van.

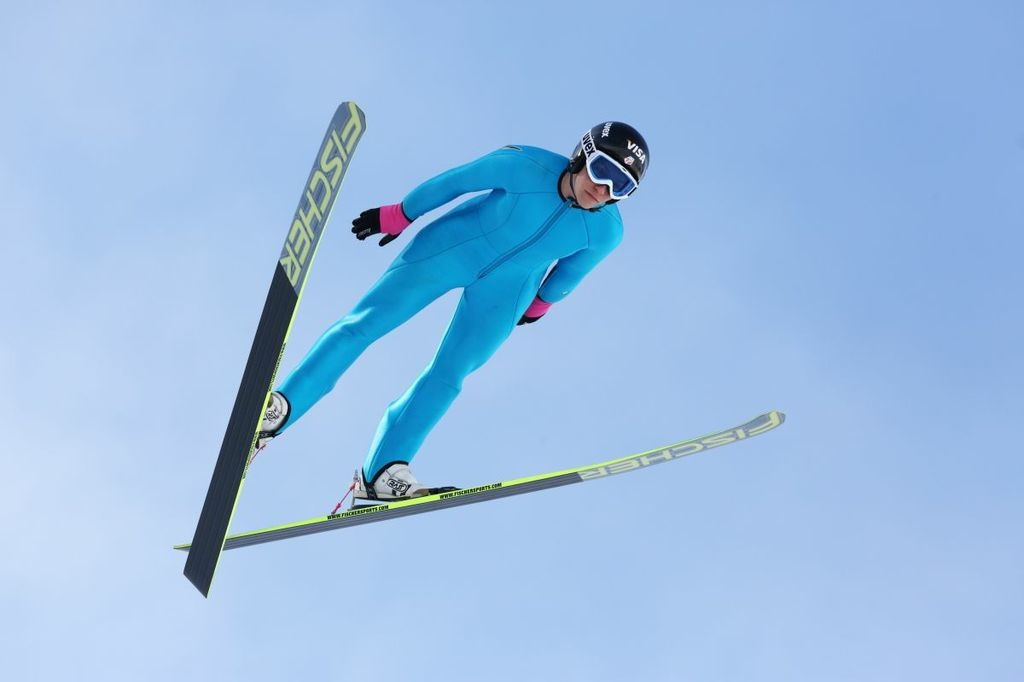
Jessica Jerome in flight at the U.S. Olympic Team Trials in Park City, UT.

== Funding ==
Funding for Women's Ski Jumping USA comes from corporate sponsors, private donations, events, fundraisers and grants. Proceeds go toward training and competition expenses of the athletes on the team.

== Olympics ==
On April 6, 2011, the IOC announced that women's ski jumping would be included in the 2014 Olympic Winter Games in Sochi, Russia. The women will be compete in one event, the normal hill competition, even though men compete in three events. Women's Ski Jumping USA continues to advocate for equality for women in the Olympic Games.

Although women have been jumping for over 100 years, they have not been allowed to compete in the Olympic games until the upcoming games in 2014. It is every young athletes dream to one day compete on the Olympic stage but this was not an option for women ski jumpers until recently. In 1991 the International Olympic Committee (IOC) ruled that all future Olympic Sports must be opened to both genders but this sanction excluded the original sports at the inaugural Olympic Winter Games in 1924, which included ski jumping.

Women originally were not allowed to jump at the Olympics because it was thought that their bodies could not handle the sport. In 2006, the IOC turned down the International Ski Federation's (FIS) recommendation to include women's ski jumping in the 2010 Olympics in Vancouver because the sport lacked "universality," even though there were more countries and elite woman participating in ski jumping than some other Winter Olympic sports for women.
