= Frank Moss =

American politician

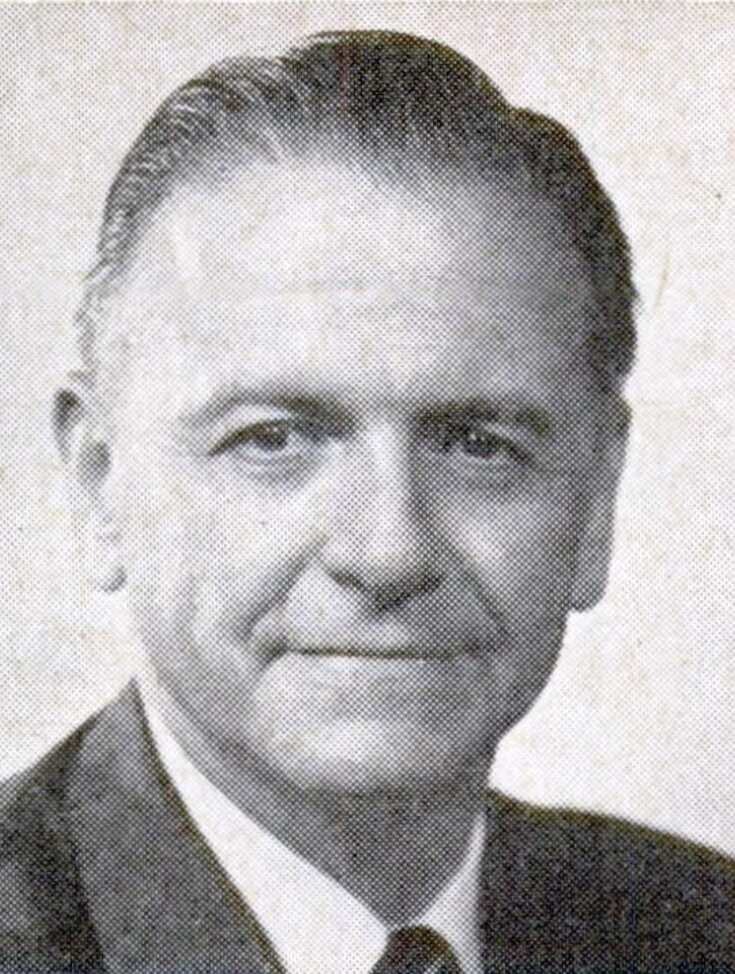
- Moss in 1959

Secretary of the Senate Democratic Conference
- In office January 3, 1971 – January 3, 1977
- Leader: Mike Mansfield
- Preceded by: Robert Byrd
- Succeeded by: Daniel Inouye

United States Senator from Utah
- In office January 3, 1959 – January 3, 1977
- Preceded by: Arthur Watkins
- Succeeded by: Orrin Hatch

Personal details
- Born: Frank Edward Moss; September 23, 1911 Salt Lake City, Utah, U.S.
- Died: January 29, 2003 (aged 91) Salt Lake City, Utah, U.S.
- Resting place: Salt Lake City Cemetery
- Party: Democratic
- Spouse: Phyllis Hart
- Children: 4
- Education: University of Utah (BA); George Washington University (LLB)

Military service
- Allegiance: United States
- Branch/service: United States Army
- Years of service: 1942–1945
- Unit: United States Army Air Corps; Army Judge Advocate General's Corps
- Battles/wars: World War II

Frank Edward "Ted" Moss (September 23, 1911 – January 29, 2003) was an American lawyer and politician. From 1959 to 1977 he served as a United States senator from Utah, and as of 2026 was the last Democrat to do so.

== Early life and education ==
Frank Moss was born in Holladay, a suburb of Salt Lake City, Utah, as the youngest of seven children of James Edward and Maude (née Nixon) Moss. His father, a well-known secondary school educator, was known as the "father of high school athletics" in Utah. In 1929, he graduated from Granite High School, where he had been freshman class president, editor of the school newspaper, two-time state debate champion, and center on the football team.

Moss then attended the University of Utah, where he was a double major in speech and history. During college, he was sophomore class president and coach of the varsity debate team. He graduated magna cum laude in 1933. The following year, he married Phyllis Hart (the daughter of Charles H. Hart), to whom he remained married until his death in 2003; the couple had one daughter and three sons.

Moss studied at the George Washington University Law School in Washington, D.C., where he was an editor of The George Washington Law Review. While studying in Washington, he worked at the National Recovery Administration, the Resettlement Administration, and the Farm Credit Administration. He received his Juris Doctor degree cum laude in 1937.

== Early career ==
After his admission to the bar, Moss was a member of the legal staff of the U.S. Securities and Exchange Commission from 1937 to 1939. He then returned to Utah, where he opened a private practice in Salt Lake City and became a law clerk to Utah Supreme Court justice James H. Wolfe. In his first run for public office, he was elected a judge of Salt Lake City's Municipal Court in 1940. During World War II, he served with the U.S. Army Air Forces in the judge advocate general's department in the European Theater (1942–1945).

Following his military service, Moss returned to Salt Lake City and was re-elected as city judge, serving in that position until his resignation in 1950. He served as county attorney for Salt Lake County from 1950 to 1959. During those years, he practiced law in the firms of Moss & Hyde (1951–1955) and Moss & Cowley (1955–1959). In 1956, he was an unsuccessful candidate for the Democratic nomination for Governor of Utah, losing to City Commissioner L.C. Romney.

== U.S. Senate ==
In 1958, Moss ran for the U.S. Senate against two-term incumbent Arthur V. Watkins, a close ally of both the Eisenhower administration and the Church of Jesus Christ of Latter-day Saints (see also Mormon), and also against J. Bracken Lee, a non-Mormon and former two-term Utah governor (1949–1957), who was running as an independent. The Republican vote was split in the general election, largely over local dissatisfaction with Watkins's having chaired the committee that censured Senator Joseph McCarthy, and Moss won election with less than 40 percent of the vote.

Moss was an original sponsor of laws to create Medicaid, a program to cover health care for low income people.

Moss was elected to a second term in 1964, defeating Brigham Young University President Ernest L. Wilkinson. He was elected to a third term in 1970 defeating four-term Congressman Laurence J. Burton. He gained national prominence with regard to environmental, consumer, and health care issues. Moss became an expert on water issues and wrote The Water Crisis in 1967. He worked to secure additional national parks for Utah and started important investigations into the care of the elderly in nursing and retirement homes, and into physicians' abuses of the federal Medicaid program. In 1976, his capacity as chairman of the U.S. Senate Subcommittee on Long-Term Care, Senator Moss made a first-hand investigation of waste, fraud and mismanagement in the Medicaid program by posing as a patient and visiting the East Harlem Medical Center in New York City. Despite having no complaints of symptoms and having had his health checked by his own physician a month before, Senator Moss "was given a costly series of tests" and then told to come back the next day for more unnecessary tests that were billed to the federal government.

In 1974, Moss joined Senator Frank Church (D-Idaho) to sponsor the first legislation to provide federal funding for hospice care programs. The bill did not have widespread support and was not brought to a vote. Congress finally included a Hospice benefit in Medicare in 1982. In 1976 Moss backed a constitutional amendment overturning Roe v. Wade and outlawing abortion.

Moss chaired the Consumer Subcommittee of the Senate Commerce Committee where he sponsored a measure, the Cigarette Labeling and Advertising Act of 1966, requiring detailed labeling on cigarette packages noting the health hazards of smoking and banning tobacco advertising on radio and television. He also sponsored the Consumer Product Warranty and Guarantee Act (known as the Magnuson-Moss Act), the Toy Safety Act, the Product Safety Act, and the Poison Prevention Packaging Act. He was also Chairman of the U.S. Senate Committee on Aeronautical and Space Sciences from 1973 to 1977.

Moss ran for a fourth term in 1976 against Republican Orrin Hatch. Among other issues, Hatch criticized Moss's 18-year tenure in the Senate, saying "What do you call a Senator who’s served in office for 18 years? You call him home." Hatch argued that many senators, including Moss, had lost touch with their constituents. Hatch won the election by an unexpectedly wide nine-point margin and proceeded to hold that seat for the next 42 years.

Afterwards, Moss returned to the practice of law in Washington, D.C. and Salt Lake City. To date, he is the last Democrat to represent Utah in the U.S. Senate.

Party political offices
Preceded by Walter K. Granger	Democratic nominee for U.S. Senator from Utah (Class 1); 1958, 1964, 1970, 1976	Succeeded by Ted Wilson
Preceded by Robert Byrd	Secretary of the Senate Democratic Caucus; 1971–1977	Succeeded by Daniel Inouye
U.S. Senate
Preceded by Arthur Watkins	U.S. Senator (Class 1) from Utah; 1959–1977; Served alongside: Wallace F. Bennett, Jake Garn	Succeeded by Orrin Hatch
Preceded by Clinton Presba Anderson	Chair of the Senate Space Committee; 1973–1977	Succeeded by Wendell Ford
