= Ted Wilson (mayor) =

American politician (1939–2024)

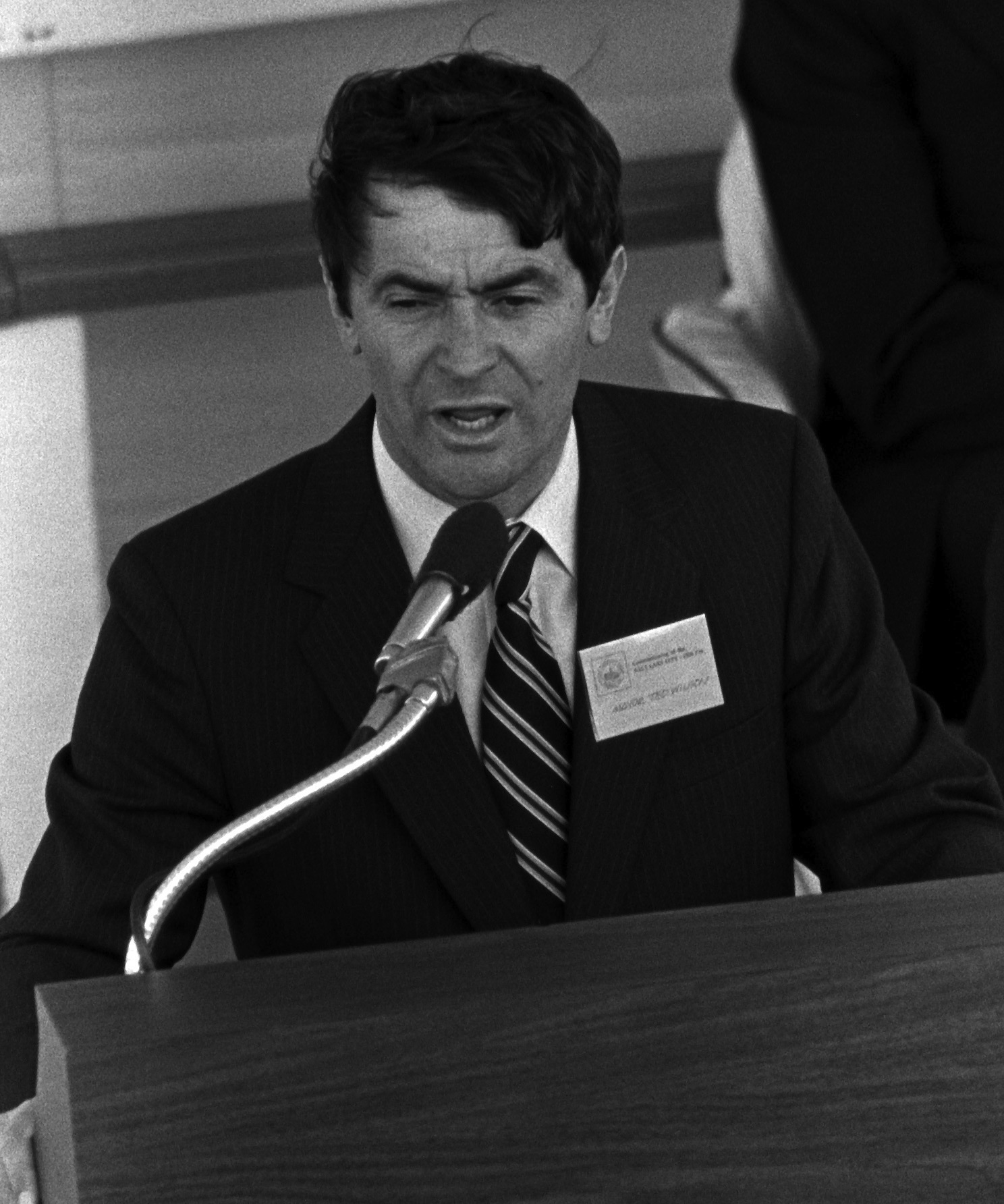
- Wilson in 1984

30th Mayor of Salt Lake City
- In office 1976–1985
- Preceded by: Conrad B. Harrison
- Succeeded by: Palmer DePaulis

Personal details
- Born: May 18, 1939 Salt Lake City, Utah, U.S.
- Died: April 11, 2024 (aged 84) Salt Lake City, Utah, U.S.
- Party: Democratic
- Spouse: Holly Mullen
- Children: 5, including Jenny
- Education: University of Utah, University of Washington

Military service
- Allegiance: United States
- Branch/service: United States Army National Guard
- Years of service: 1957–1963

Ted Lewis Wilson (May 18, 1939 – April 11, 2024) was an American politician who served as the 30th mayor of Salt Lake City from 1976 until July 1985. He won three elections. Wilson resigned during his third term to become the director of the Hinckley Institute of Politics at the University of Utah where he held an adjunct assistant professorship of Political Science.

His terms were highlighted by an election in May 1979 to change the five-member commission form of government to a mayor/council form. This initiative was the consequence of a city scandal involving the take-over of the city personnel department by the chief of police.

Other highlights of Wilson's administration included reconstruction of the Salt Lake City International Airport, re-building the city's sewage treatment plant, retooling the water system, and expanding the green space of the city's parks department. Wilson also initiated and passed the first historical and foothill preservation ordinances in the city's history. Wilson was the executive director of the Utah Rivers Council, a Utah-based environmental organization.

== Early life and education ==
Ted Wilson was born May 18, 1939, in Salt Lake City, Utah. He attended schools in Salt Lake City, graduating from South High School in 1957 and from the University of Utah in 1964, with a Bachelor of Science degree in political science. He received a master's degree in Education from the University of Washington in 1969. In 1983, he received an honorary Doctorate of Laws from Westminster College of Salt Lake City.

== Career ==
From 1957 to 1963, he served in the Utah Army National Guard and was activated to full-time status during the Berlin Crisis. He was an instructor at the Leysin American School, Leysin, Switzerland for one year. He also taught economics at Skyline High School, Salt Lake City, Utah for seven years. During the summer months of 1966 to 1969 he was a mountaineering park ranger in Grand Teton National Park.

He was appointed Chief of Staff to U.S. Congressman Wayne Owens (D-UT) in March 1973. In April 1975 he was appointed to direct the Department of Social Services in Salt Lake County. In November 1975 he was elected as Mayor of Salt Lake City. He served as Mayor until July 1, 1985, when he became the Director of the Hinckley Institute of Politics at the University of Utah. Retiring from the Hinckley Institute in September 2003, Wilson retained status as Professor Emeritus of political science and continued to teach classes at the university. Wilson was a founder of the Exoro Co.

He ran against Orrin Hatch for the U.S. Senate in 1982. In 1988, he was the Democratic candidate for Governor of Utah. In 1991, Wilson was selected by the Harvard University John F. Kennedy School of Government as an institute fellow during the Autumn Semester.

Personal travel to India allowed Wilson to study and understand the Indian system of government. Wilson made ten trips to India leading university student expeditions. During those visits, he met with the Dalai Lama, and led efforts to build housing for Tibetan Refugees in Bir, a community hall in Leh, Ladakh and a school in Kotwara.

Wilson loved the sport of mountaineering and climbed routes in Utah, in the Tetons, and in other ranges including the Alps, Alaska, and the Andes. Wilson was a member of the Alpenbock Climbing Club, a group instrumental to developing climbing routes throughout the Wasatch range. Wilson established three climbing schools still in operation and was a climbing ranger in Grand Teton National Park. He guided in the Tetons for Exum Mountain Guides and owned the Jackson Hole Mountain Guides in 1970. He received the U.S. Department of the Interior Valor award for a mountain rescue on the North Face of the Grand Teton in 1967.

Wilson was married to former Salt Lake Tribune columnist Holly Mullen. From his previous marriage to Kathryn Carling, Wilson had five children. He was stepfather to Mullen's two children. He was also a grandfather to 13 grandchildren.

Wilson was actively involved on several boards, including the Friends of Alta, the Utah Governor's Energy Task Force, and served as chairman of the Utah Governor's Council on Balanced Resources. He found pleasure in activities such as bicycling, skiing, rock climbing, and backpacking with his family.

Ted Wilson died from complications from heart failure and Parkinson's disease on April 11, 2024, at the age of 84.

== Awards and honors ==
- National Science Foundation Fellow, University of Washington, 1968–69
- Department of Interior, Valor Award, 1968, for Grand Teton north face rescue
- Utah Bolivian Partners, Fern Wiser Award for Distinguished Service to Bolivian Education, 1976
- Utah National Guard, Bronze Minuteman Award, 1979
- Chairman, Utah Presidential Inaugural Hosting Committee for President Carter, 1977
- Utah League of Cities and Towns Award - Outstanding Utah Elected Municipal Official, 1983
- Honorary Doctorate of Laws, Westminster College of Salt Lake City June, 1984
- Fellow, John F. Kennedy Institute of Politics, Harvard University, 1991
- Pi Sigma Alpha "Professor of the Year," 1994; University of Utah Political Science Department
- Mortar Board National Honor Society "Top Professor Award," 1996
- Professor Emeritus, University of Utah
- Department of Communication, University of Utah, Distinguished Service Award, 2011
- University of Utah Emeritus Alumni Board, Merit of Honor Award, 2012

== Publications ==
=== Books ===
- Utah's Wasatch Front, Utah Geographic Series, 1987
- Utah Then and Now, Westcliffe Publishers, 2000.

=== Press ===
- Numerous articles in The Wasatch Runner and the Utah Business Review Op-Ed articles in Deseret News and Salt Lake Tribune, The Event, "Putting Together the Leadership Puzzle."
- Weekly political column in The Enterprise, a Salt Lake City business newspaper 2000 to 2001
- Weekly political column in The Deseret News, a Salt Lake City daily newspaper, Wilson and Webb 2000–2002.
- Article in Utah Forum, "Professor Productivity: An Emerging Issue in America and Utah," June, 1994.

Party political offices
Preceded by Frank Moss	Democratic nominee for U.S. Senator from Utah (Class 1); 1982	Succeeded by Brian Moss
Preceded by Wayne Owens	Democratic nominee for Governor of Utah; 1988	Succeeded by Stewart Hanson
Political offices
Preceded by Conrad B. Harrison	Mayor of Salt Lake City; 1976–1985	Succeeded by Palmer DePaulis
