= Discovery Gateway =

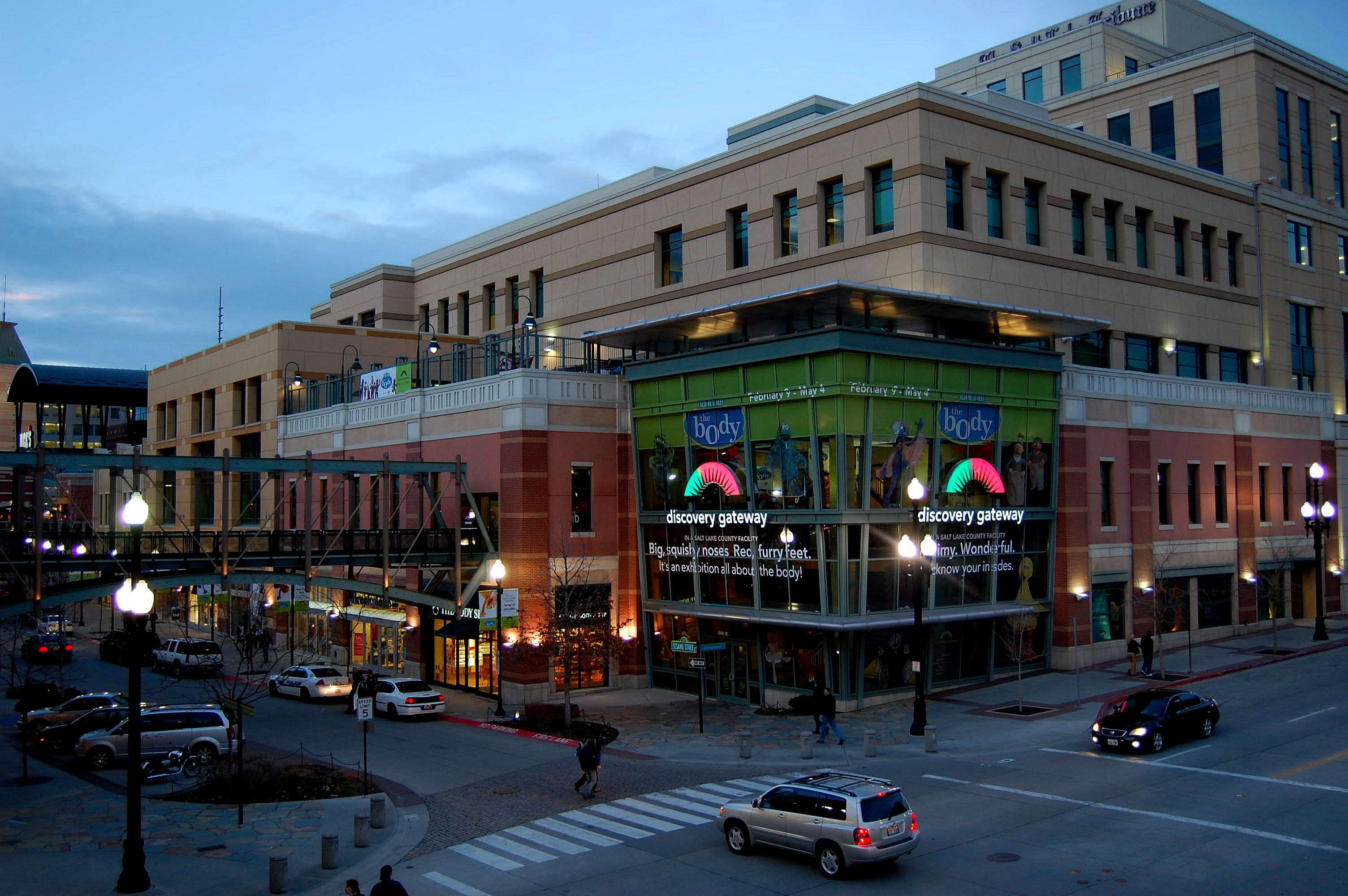
- Museum front entrance
- Former name: Children's Museum of Utah
- Established: 1978
- Location: 444 W 100 S Salt Lake City, Utah 84101
- Coordinates: 40°46′04″N 111°54′14″W
- Type: Children's museum
- CEO: Kathleen Bodenlos
- Chairperson: Jennifer Tarazon
- Website: discoverygateway.org

Discovery Gateway, formerly the Children's Museum of Utah, is an interactive, hands-on children's museum located in downtown Salt Lake City, Utah, United States. Comprising over 60,000 square feet (6,000 m^{2}) of exhibit space, Discovery Gateway is located at 444 West 100 South in The Gateway.

== History ==
The Children's Museum of Utah was founded in 1978 and opened its doors in 1983. For most of its history, TCMU was located in the former Wasatch Warm Springs building two miles north of downtown Salt Lake City. The museum started with only eight exhibits. Some of these original exhibits included the paleontology dig of a mammoth dinosaur bones, a Western Airline's 737 cockpit, the artificial heart demonstration, the frozen bubble box using dry ice, and the KSL news station for children. By 1998, TCMU had grown to 140 permanent exhibits and over 15,000 square feet (1,000 m^{2}) of public space. That year, it had become evident that TCMU had reached the physical limits imposed by its current building, and the decision was made to relocate and expand to better serve the community. In 2002, a bond issue was approved by Salt Lake County voters to fund the relocation of TCMU to a new, larger building in the Gateway District of Salt Lake City. Ground was broken on the new Museum on 22 September 2005. Less than one year later, on 16 September 2006, TCMU opened to the public at its current location and officially became Discovery Gateway.

== Exhibits ==
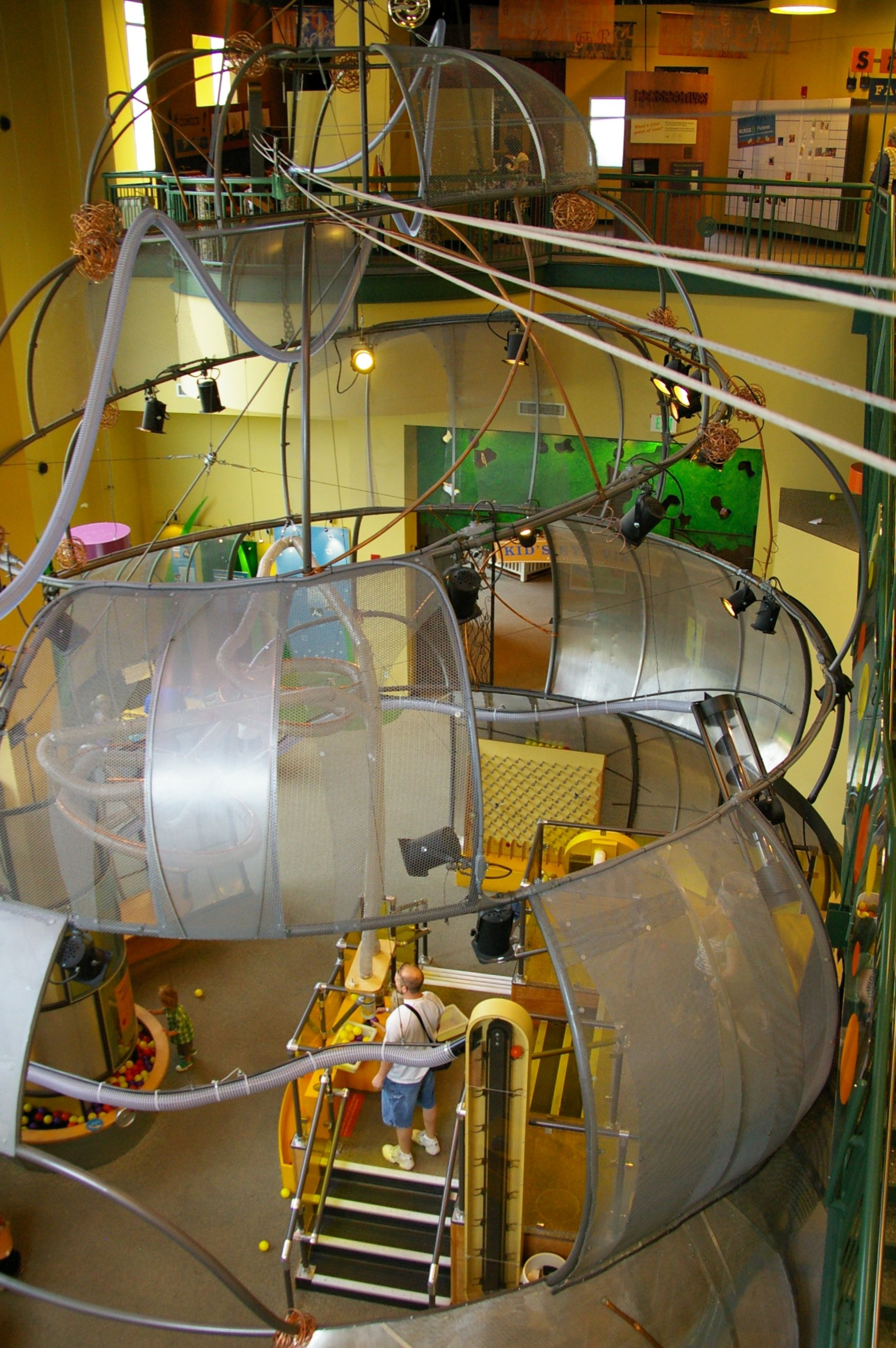
30-foot beehive at the Garden

Everything at Discovery Gateway is designed with kids in mind. The exhibits are all interactive and hands-on. Exhibits on the second floor of the museum include the Garden, where kids can play music together on a giant marimba, keep an enormous machine humming, or peer into a “penny drop” to see how every little bit adds up. Just behind the Garden is Kid's Eye View, a kid-sized town where kids can shop in the Market, build structures in the Construction Zone, or feed the animals on the Utah Family Farm. Within Kid's Eye View is Hatch, Waddle, and Fly, an area dedicated just to children under the age of three.

The third floor of the museum features the Story Factory, where kids direct the action by putting on a play, drawing a comic strip, or making a stop-motion animated film. Also located on the third floor is the Studio, where the worlds of science, invention, and art meet. The museum's outdoor terrace houses Saving Lives From The Sky, which includes a real Intermountain Healthcare Life Flight helicopter for visitors to learn about rescue operations.

== Special exhibits ==
A special exhibits gallery hosts rotating exhibits from museums around the nation. Previous exhibits have included Robots: The Interactive Exhibition, Sesame Street Presents: The Body, and Invention at Play.

== Programs ==
Discovery Gateway's programs explore science, art, and the humanities. Workshops and classes are geared to meet the needs of children ages birth - 12. Early Childhood Education classes take place daily in the Curiosity Shop and let kids practice fine and gross motor skills. Programs and workshops for older kids take place in the Workshop Room and often focus on the exhibits at the museum. Discovery Gateway prints a calendar of classes every month.

In 2012 Discovery Gateway introduced Sensory Inclusive Afternoon, a feature in which they dim lights and cut noise in order to make the museum and its exhibits more autism friendly.

The museum began a virtual concert series during the 2020 COVID-19 pandemic. The following year they expanded to outdoor in-person concerts.

== Outreach ==
Discovery Gateway offers a chemistry program, Reaction Time, to every 5th grade class in the state of Utah. Over 55,000 children from every county in Utah have participated in this program.

== Junior Achievement city ==
Discovery Gateway, in conjunction with Junior Achievement of Utah, operates Junior Achievement City, the only JA Enterprise Village/Finance Park program facility within 700 miles (1,130 km) of Salt Lake City. Junior Achievement City offers hands-on experiences for school groups that support learning about economics, the free enterprise system, career options, and personal finance. Junior Achievement City is located on the fourth floor of the museum, and is currently open only to school groups.
