= Norman H. Bangerter =

American politician (1933–2015)

Norman Bangerter
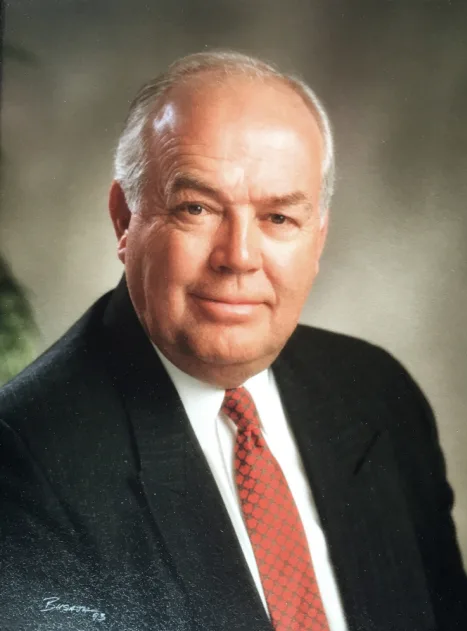

13th Governor of Utah
- In office January 7, 1985 – January 4, 1993
- Lieutenant: Val Oveson
- Preceded by: Scott Matheson
- Succeeded by: Mike Leavitt

Member of the Utah House of Representatives
- In office 1975–1985

Personal details
- Born: Norman Howard Bangerter; January 4, 1933 Granger, Utah, U.S.
- Died: April 14, 2015 (aged 82) Murray, Utah, U.S.
- Party: Republican
- Spouse: Colleen Monson
- Relations: William Grant Bangerter (brother)
- Children: 6

Norman Howard Bangerter (January 4, 1933 – April 14, 2015) was an American politician who served as the 13th governor of Utah from 1985 to 1993. He was the first Republican elected to the position since 1960, and the first to hold the office since 1965.

== Early life ==
Bangerter was born in Granger, Utah (now West Valley City) to William Henry Bangerter and Isabelle Bawden. His older brother, William Grant Bangerter, served as a General Authority of the Church of Jesus Christ of Latter-day Saints (LDS Church).

== Career ==
Prior to his election, Bangerter founded a successful construction firm which specialized in building homes. He served in the Utah House of Representatives from 1975 to 1985 and as speaker of that body from 1981 until 1985.

During his tenure as governor, Bangerter dealt with the flooding of the Great Salt Lake and its tributaries by approving the construction of large, US$60 million pumps to channel excess water from the Great Salt Lake onto the Bonneville Salt Flats. This was initially successful, yet caused some controversy when the lake's water level fell in later years, and some regarded the idle pumps as wasteful.

Bangerter's "foremost interest was improving the state's educational system".

After his retirement as governor, Bangerter returned to his construction firm and served for three years as president of the South Africa Johannesburg Mission of the LDS Church from 1996 to 1999.

The Bangerter Highway (SR-154), which opened in 1998, was named after the former governor, who had long supported such a road.

In 2008, Bangerter was appointed to the Governing Board for the national children's charity Operation Kids.

== Personal life ==
Bangerter married his wife, the former Colleen Monson, in 1953. The two had six children and one foster son.

On April 14, 2015, Bangerter suffered a stroke and later died at the age of 82.

Party political offices
Preceded by Bob Wright	Republican nominee for Governor of Utah; 1984, 1988	Succeeded by Mike Leavitt
Political offices
Preceded by Scott Matheson	Governor of Utah; 1985–1993	Succeeded by Mike Leavitt
