= Matheson (surname) =

Matheson is a surname derived from either an anglicised form of Scottish Gaelic surnames or the patronymic form of a short form of the English Matthew. This English personal name is ultimately derived from the Biblical Hebrew מַתִּתְיָהוּ (mattiṯyāhū), which means "gift of God". An early record form of the surname Matheson is Mathyson, recorded in 1392; this recorded name literally means "son of Mathi"—Mathi being a pet form of Matthew. Two different Scottish Gaelic surnames have been Anglicised Matheson. One such surname is Mac Mhathghamhuin (Clan Matheson), which became Anglicised Matheson on account of its similar sound. This Gaelic surname is of an entirely different etymology than Matheson, as the Gaelic mathghamhuin means "bear". (Note: The English bear translates into modern Scottish Gaelic as mathan, and math-ghamhainn. In modern Scottish Gaelic, the older termination -uinn is rendered -ainn.) Another Gaelic surname Anglicised Matheson is Mac Matha. This Gaelic surname is derived from the patronymic form of a Gaelic form of Matthew (for example, the modern Scottish Gaelic Mata and Matha are cognates of the English Matthew).

== People with the surname ==
- Alexander Matheson (disambiguation), multiple people
- Angus Matheson (1912–1962), inaugural Professor of Celtic at the University of Glasgow
- Arthur Matheson, Canadian politician
- Bob Matheson, National Football League player
- Charlie Matheson, fictional character in Revolution
- Chris Matheson, British politician
- Dan Matheson, Canadian television sportscaster, host & news reader
- Danny Matheson, fictional character in Revolution
- Diana Matheson, Canadian football (soccer) midfielder
- Donald Macleod Matheson CBE (1896–1979), Secretary of the National Trust, Traditionalist author
- Ewing Matheson (1840–1917), British civil engineer and consulting engineer
- George Matheson (1842–1906), Scottish theologian
- Guy Matheson (1952- ), Australian politician
- Hans Matheson, Scottish actor
- Hilda Matheson (1888–1940), first Director of Talks at the BBC
- Hugh Matheson, British oarsman
- Hugh Mackay Matheson, (1821–1898), Scottish industrialist
- James Matheson, Scottish businessman
- Jim Matheson, American politician, son of Scott M. Matheson
- John Matheson, Canadian politician
- Karen Matheson, Scottish folk musician
- Kay Matheson, Teacher, Gaelic scholar, one of four students involved in the 1950 removal of the Stone of Scone.
- Lily Matheson, English Socialite
- Louis Matheson, British-Australian academic
- Luke Matheson (2002-), English footballer
- Mal Matheson, New Zealand cricketer
- Michael Matheson (disambiguation), multiple people
- Miki Matheson, Japanese Paralympic gold medalist
- Norma Matheson, American politician, former First Lady of Utah
- Rachel Matheson (disambiguation), fictional characters
- Richard Matheson, American writer
- Richard Christian Matheson, American writer, son of Richard Matheson
- Robert Matheson (architect)
- Robert Matheson (entomologist)
- Robert (Bob) Matheson, National Football League player
- Robert J. Matheson (1907–1956), American politician and businessman
- Roderick N. Matheson, American Civil War figure
- Scott Milne Matheson, Sr. (1897–1958), US Attorney for Utah 1949–1953
- Scott M. Matheson (Utah governor) (1929–1990), son of the above, governor of Utah 1977–1985
- Scott Matheson, Jr. (born 1953), son of the above, US Attorney for Utah from 1993–1997, currently a judge on the 10th United States Circuit Court
- Shirlee Matheson, Canadian children's writer
- Tim Matheson, American actor
- William Matheson (Gaelic scholar) (1910–1995), Scottish Gaelic scholar, and ordained minister of the Church of Scotland
- William John Matheson, American industrialist
