= Scott Matheson =

Scott Matheson may refer to:

- Scott Milne Matheson Sr. (1897–1958), US Attorney for Utah 1949–1953
- Scott M. Matheson (1929–1990) son of the above, governor of Utah 1977–1985
- Scott Matheson Jr. (born 1953) son of the above, US Attorney for Utah from 1993 to 1997, currently a judge on the 10th United States Circuit Court
