= Kermac Macmaghan =

13th-century Scottish chieftain

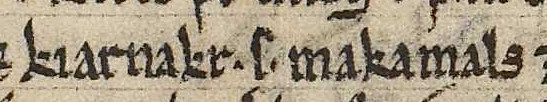
- Kermac's name as it appears on folio 121v of AM 45 fol (Codex Frisianus): "Kiarnakr son Makamals".

Kermac Macmaghan (fl. 1262–1264) was a thirteenth-century Scottish nobleman. In 1262, he is stated to have aided William I, Earl of Ross, in a particularly vicious attack in the Hebrides. The assault itself is recorded by a thirteenth-century Scandinavian saga, and was likely conducted on behalf of Alexander III, King of Scotland, who wished to incorporate Isles into the Scottish realm. The following year, Hákon Hákonarson, King of Norway, launched an expedition into the Isles to reassert Norwegian authority. The latter's campaign proved to be an utter failure, and after his departure and death the same year, the Scots forced the submission of the leading magnates of the Isles. In 1264, Kermac is recorded to have received compensation for services rendered. A fifteenth-century pedigree concerning Clan Matheson (Clann Mhic Mhathain) seems to indicate that Kermac is identical to a certain Coinneach mac Mathghamhna, ancestor of the clan. The latter may or may not be an ancestor of Clan Mackenzie (Clann Choinnich).

== Scottish vassal ==
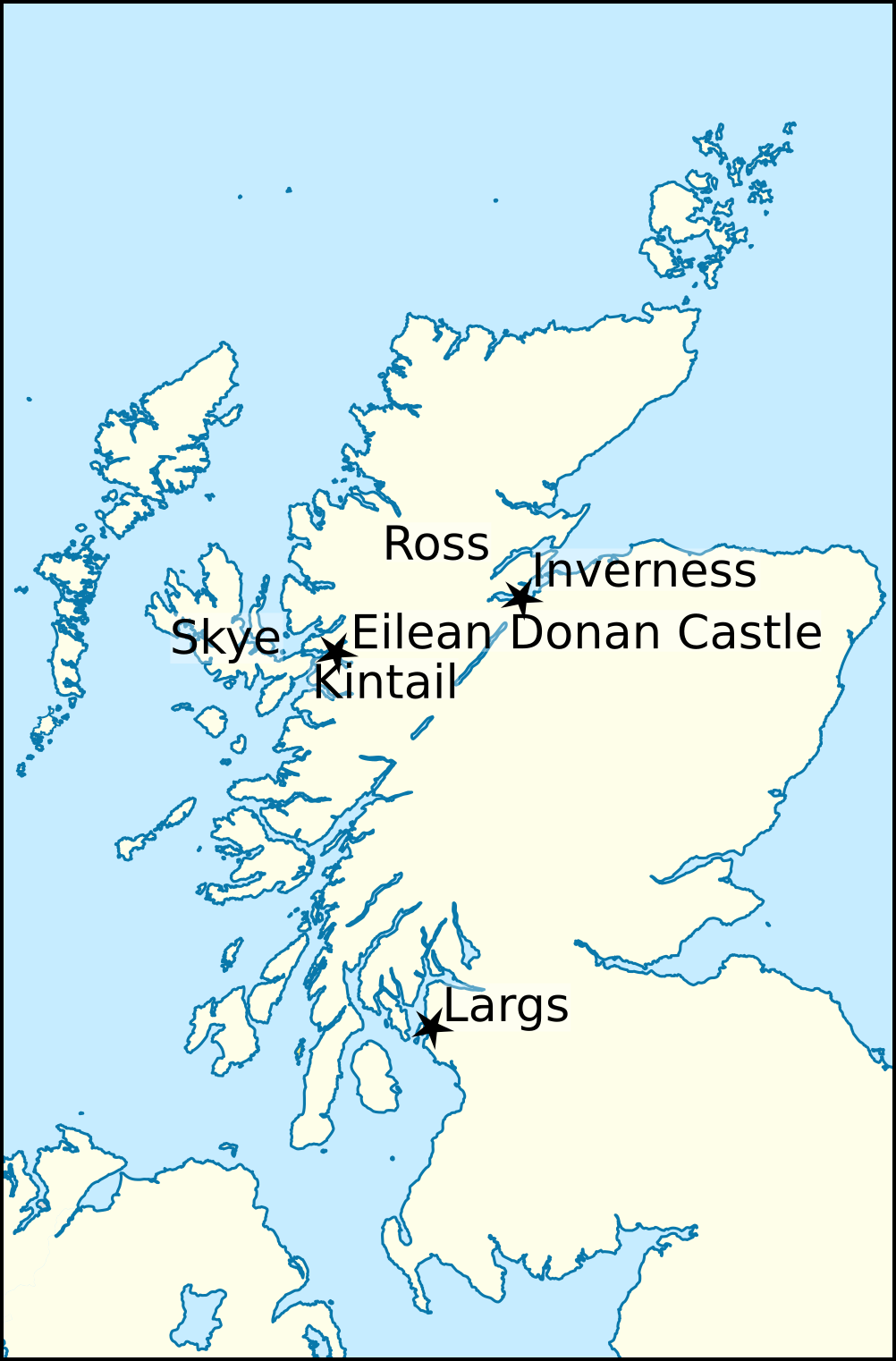
Locations relating to Kermac's life and times.

In the midpoint of the thirteenth century, Alexander II, King of Scots, and his son and successor, Alexander III, King of Scots, made several attempts to incorporate the Hebrides into the Scottish realm. Forming a part of the Kingdom of the Isles, these islands were a component of the far-flung Norwegian commonwealth. The independence of the Islesmen, and the lurking threat of their nominal overlord, the formidable Hákon Hákonarson, King of Norway, constituted a constant source of concern for the Scottish Crown.

Seal of Alexander III depicting the armament of a contemporary mounted knight.

In 1261, Alexander III sent an embassy to Norway attempting to negotiate the purchase of the Isles from the Norwegian Crown. When mediation came to nought, Alexander III evidently orchestrated an invasion into the Isles as means to openly challenge his Norwegian counterpart's authority. Specifically, the thirteenth-century Hákonar saga Hákonarsonar indicates that Kermac aided William I, Earl of Ross, during this action, and states that the two led a force of Scots who burnt down a town and churches on Skye. The invaders are described to have killed many men and women in their attack, and to have viciously impaled little children upon their spears. It is possible that the remarkable savagery attributed to the Scots may have been intended to terrorise the Islesmen into submission. The island itself appears to have formed part of the kingdom controlled by Magnús Óláfsson, King of Mann and the Isles. The earl's followers in this enterprise were likely drawn from his vast provincial lordship.

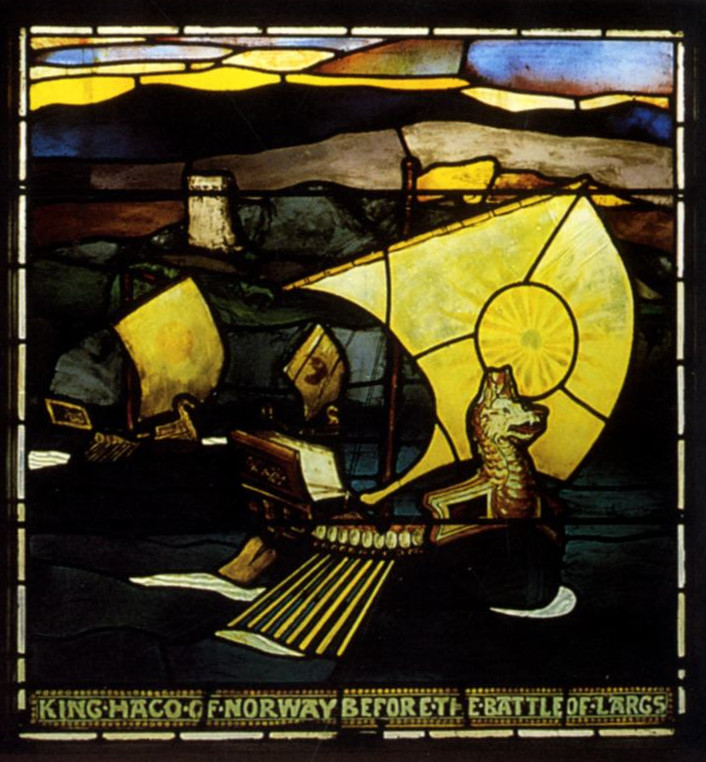
Nineteenth-century stained glass window commemorating the Battle of Largs.

Thus provoked, Hákon assembled an enormous fleet to reassert Norwegian sovereignty along the north and west coasts of Scotland. In July 1263, this fleet disembarked from Norway, and by mid August, Hákon reaffirmed his overlordship in Shetland and Orkney, forced the submission of Caithness, and arrived in the Hebrides. Having rendezvoused with his vassals in the region, Hákon secured several castles, oversaw raids into the surrounding mainland. Unfortunately for the Norwegian king, stormy weather drove some of his ships ashore on the Ayrshire coast. A series of inconclusive skirmishes upon the shore near Largs, together with ever-worsening weather, discouraged the Norwegians and convinced them to turn for home. After redistributing portions of the region to certain faithful supporters, Hákon led his forces from the Hebrides and reached the Northern Isles, where he fell ill and died that December.

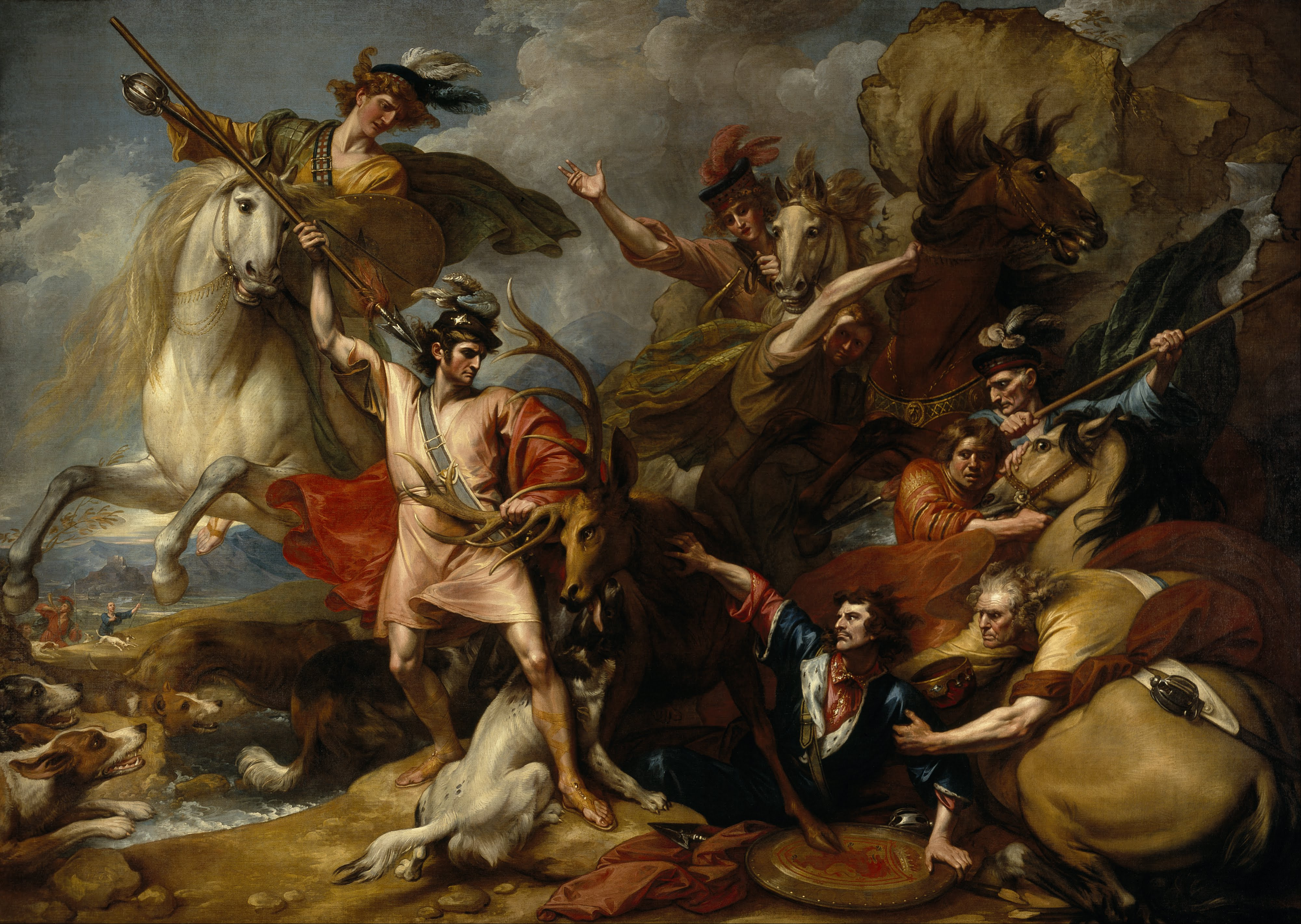
Alexander III of Scotland Rescued from the Fury of a Stag by the Intrepidity of Colin Fitzgerald, an eighteenth-century depiction of an unhistorical Mackenzie ancestor purported to have lived during Kermac's floruit. (Note: The painting depicts Colin Fitzgerald bravely saving Alexander III from a stag. The painting was likely commissioned by the Mackenzie chief, Francis Humberstone Mackenzie, as a means to rehabilitate his family's standing in society. Although the Mackenzies possessed Jacobite affiliations earlier in the century, the painting incorporates elements from contemporary military uniforms and weaponry, seemingly as a means to stress his family's loyalty to the reigning George III, King of Great Britain and Ireland. The heroically-depicted Colin may have been a genealogical invention of George Mackenzie, Earl of Cromartie, although there is evidence to suggest a Fitzgerald origin of the clan was claimed somewhat earlier in the seventeenth century. The history of the Mackenzies cannot be securely traced before the fifteenth century. Surviving manuscript histories of the clan date to the seventeenth century, and much of the information preserved by these sources is unreliable in terms of the clan's early history. For instance, these histories assert that the Mackenzies descend from Colin, an otherwise unattested nobleman from Ireland who supposedly lived during the reign of Alexander III and fought for the king at Largs. The absence of names equating to Colin and Fitzgerald from the MS 1467, and the lack of contemporary evidence noting such a man, strongly suggest that this Fitzgerald origin of the Mackenzies is an unhistorical genealogical construction.)

Although Hákonar saga Hákonarsonar declares that the Norwegian campaign was a triumph, in reality it was an utter failure. Hákon had failed to break Scottish power; and the following year, Alexander III seized the initiative, and oversaw a series of invasions into the Isles and northern Scotland. According to the thirteenth-century Gesta Annalia I, one such expedition was undertaken by Alexander Comyn, Earl of Buchan, William, Earl of Mar, and Alan Hostarius. Heavy fines were extracted from the northern reaches of the Scottish realm. Two hundred head of cattle were extracted from the Caithnessmen, and one hundred eighty head of cattle from the Earl of Ross himself. The severity of this latter fine could be evidence that the earl's actions during the Scoto-Norwegian conflict were deemed unacceptable by the Scottish Crown. In fact, the aforesaid Alexander Comyn and Alan are known to have extracted twenty head of cattle from William's earldom and granted this sum to Kermac as compensation for services rendered. (Note: The record of this particular transaction exists only in a seventeenth-century transcription. Although Kermac's name is preserved as "Kermac Macmaghan" in this copy, it is likely that the first name is actually a miscopy of "Kennac", an otherwise attested form of the Gaelic names Cainnech and Coinneach.)

In 1266, almost three years after Hákon's abortive campaign, terms of peace were finally agreed upon between the Scottish and Norwegian crowns. Specifically, with the conclusion of the Treaty of Perth in July, Hákon's son and successor, Magnús Hákonarson, King of Norway, formally resigned all rights to Mann and the islands on the western coast of Scotland. In so doing, the territorial dispute over Scotland's western maritime region was settled at last.

== Ancestral figure ==
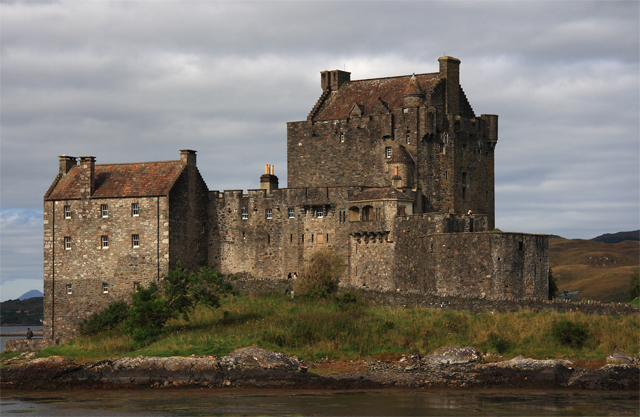
According to tradition, Eilean Donan Castle was constructed by a chieftain from Kintail, a man who could be identical to Kermac. The present structure dates to the early twentieth century, and serves as an example of modern romanticism rather than a mediaeval fortress.

Kermac appears to be identical to Coinneach mac Mathghamhna, a figure who appears in the pedigree of Clan Matheson (Clann Mhic Mhathain) preserved within the fifteenth-century MS 1467. If correct, Kermac would be the clan's eponymous ancestor, and the record of 1264 would be the earliest recorded instance of the Gaelic surname borne by the clan. (Note: The surname Matheson is derived from a patronymic form of a short form of Matthew. A form of the Gaelic surname borne by the clan is Mac Mhathghamhuin. This name came to be anglicised as Matheson on account of the similar sound of these names. The names (Mac Mhathghamhuin and Matthew) are otherwise unrelated.) Another clan covered within MS 1467 is the neighbouring Clan Mackenzie (Clann Choinnich). Although this Mackenzie genealogy can be interpreted as evidence of a line of descent from Coinneach as well, an alternative interpretation of this source is that it is evidence that the clans share an earlier common ancestor. (Note: Although there is reason to suspect that the ancestry of the Mackenzies and Mathesons links up at some point, it is not certain where this connection lies. If the Mackenzie pedigree is taken literally, the clan's descent is traced from a certain Gille Eoin na hAirde. The Matheson pedigree traces a line of descent from Coinneach's grandfather, a certain Cristin. If a garbled pedigree preserved by the eighteenth-century Black Book of Clanranald is taken into account—a source that accords a son to Gille Eoin named Cristin—it could be reveal that the Cristin of the Matheson pedigree was a son of Gille Eoin na hAirde. If correct, the genealogical connection between the two clans would seem to date generations before Coinneach. On the other hand, there is reason to suspect that the number of generations outlined in the Mackenzie pedigree may be inaccurate. If taken into account, this pedigree could instead indicate that the genealogical link between the clans exists in the person of Coinneach's son, Murchadh.)

According to tradition that seems to refer to Coinneach, a young chieftain from Kintail—a man related to the Mathesons—spent time on the Continent in the service of the King of France. After having travelled to distant lands on a ship provided by the king, this chieftain is said to have returned home to Scotland a prosperous and accomplished man, and was later commissioned by Alexander II, King of Scotland to construct Eilean Donan Castle. According to the mediaeval chronicler Matthew Paris, Hugh de Châtillon, Count of Saint-Pol commissioned the construction of a great ship at Inverness in preparation for the Seventh Crusade. Although it is unknown whether Kermac was indeed a sea-going participant in this crusade led by Louis IX, King of France, some Scottish noblemen certainly did accompany the king on the campaign.
