= 1980 United States presidential election in Utah =

- November 4, 1980

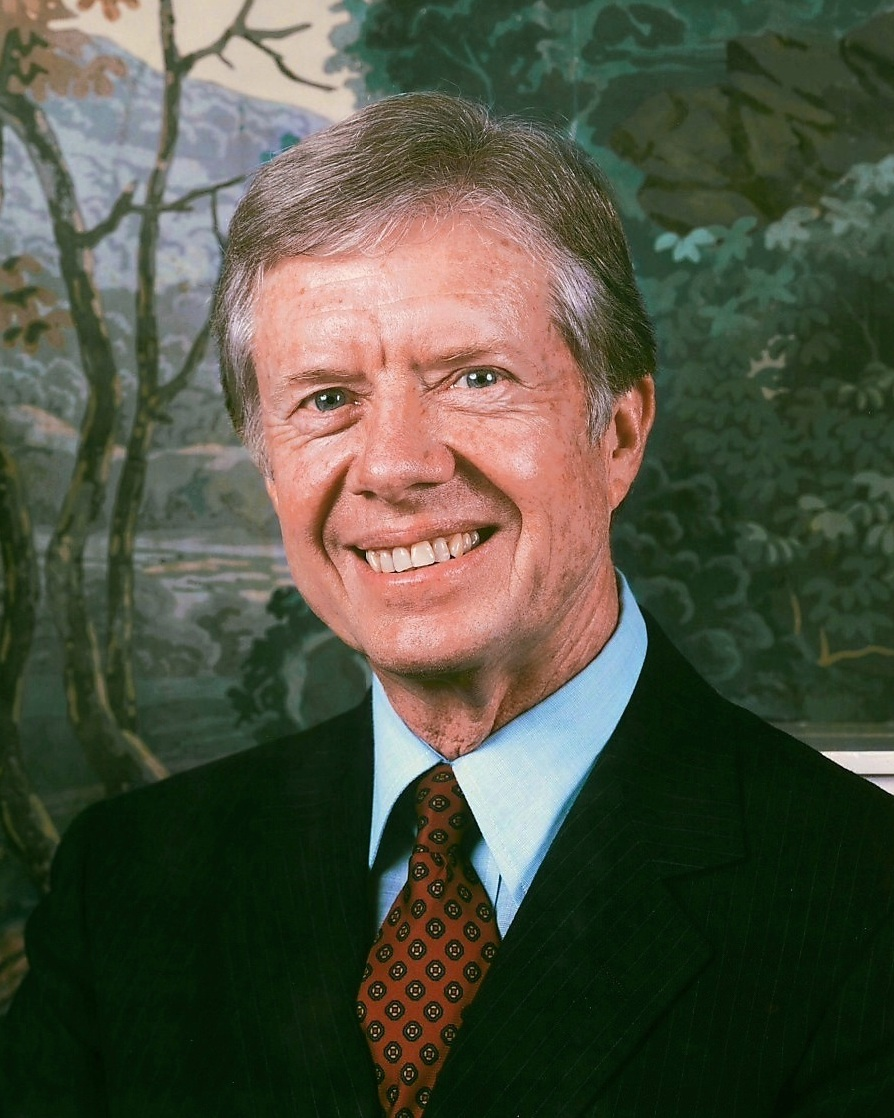

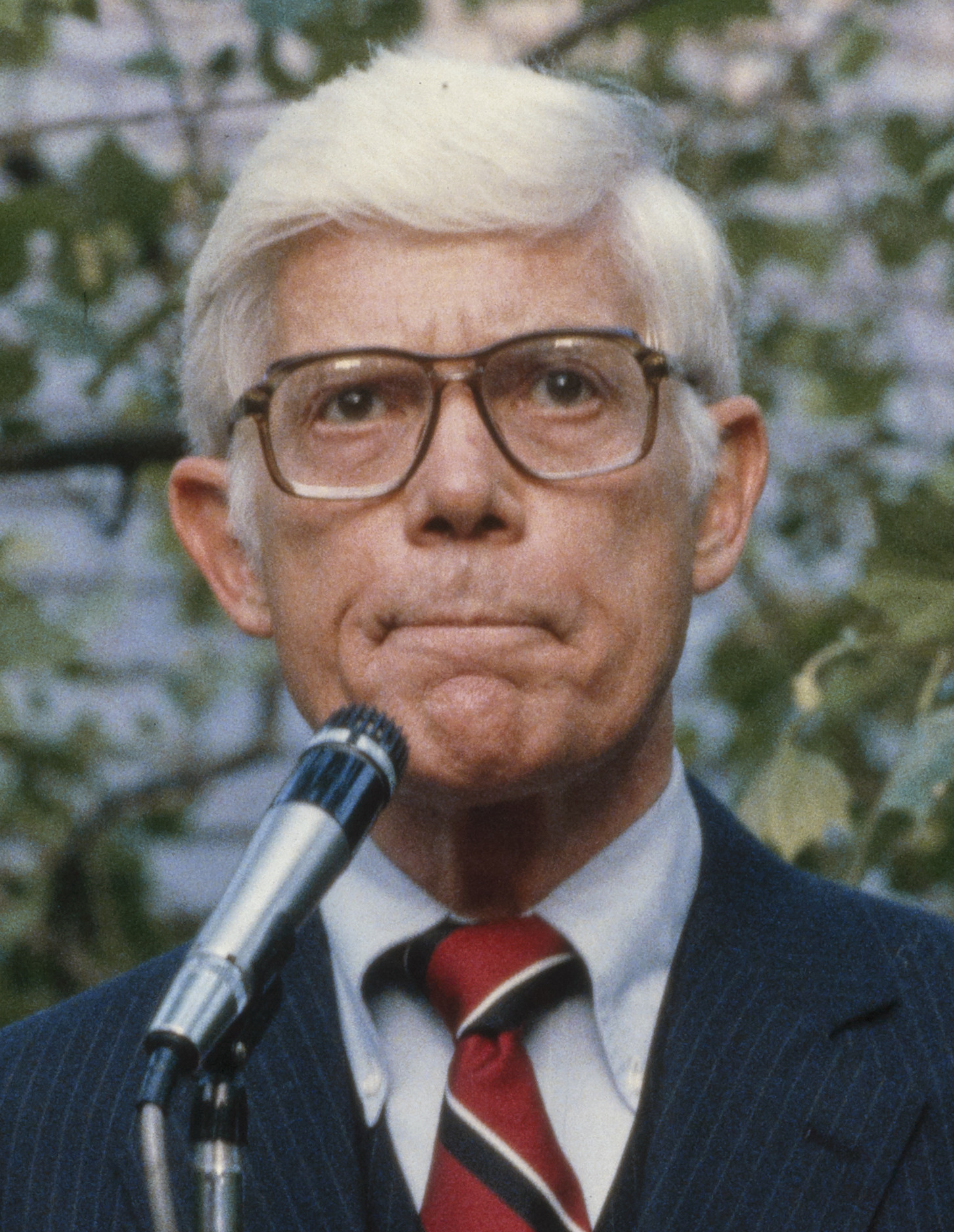
Nominee	Ronald Reagan	Jimmy Carter	John B. Anderson
Party	Republican	Democratic	Independent
Home state	California	Georgia	Illinois
Running mate	George H. W. Bush	Walter Mondale	Patrick Lucey
Electoral vote	4	0	0
Popular vote	439,687	124,266	30,284
Percentage	72.77%	20.57%	5.01%
County results
Reagan
40–50%
60–70%
70–80%
80–90%
President before election
Jimmy Carter
Democratic
Elected President
Ronald Reagan
Republican

The 1980 United States presidential election in Utah took place on November 4, 1980. All 50 states and the District of Columbia were part of the election. State voters chose four electors to the Electoral College, which selected the president and vice president of the United States.

Utah was won by former Governor of California Ronald Reagan, the Republican nominee, who was running against incumbent president and former Governor of Georgia Jimmy Carter, the Democratic nominee. Reagan ran with former C.I.A. Director George H. W. Bush of Texas, and Carter ran with Walter Mondale, incumbent vice president and former senator from Minnesota. Reagan won the election nationally by a landslide.

Utah weighed in as the most Republican state in the nation in this election. Carter's share of the popular vote remains the worst ever by a Democrat in Utah. Reagan won Carbon County by a mere three votes, but easily beat Carter throughout the rest of the state, who was widely criticized for his inability to understand issues specific to the West (especially water development). Carter's next best county was Tooele where Reagan obtained 62.03 percent of the vote; Reagan surpassed three-quarters of the vote in seventeen of twenty-nine counties. In spite of Reagan's massive victory in the state, incumbent Democratic governor Scott M. Matheson was comfortably re-elected in the concurrent gubernatorial election - the last time a Democrat has won the Utah governorship to date.

Liberal Republican John B. Anderson ran as an independent candidate with some success in the Northeast, the Pacific Northwest, Colorado and some college towns; however in largely conservative, Mormon Utah, Anderson possessed less appeal, getting 5.01 percent of the vote statewide, and could not exceed 9.42 percent of the vote in any county. Anderson polled a mere three votes and 0.42 percent of the vote in Piute County, and a very low 1.47 percent of the vote out of over 86,000 votes cast in the second most populated county in the state, Utah County.

== Results ==
1980 United States presidential election in Utah
Party	Candidate	Votes	%
Republican	Ronald Reagan	439,687	72.77%
Democratic	Jimmy Carter (inc.)	124,266	20.57%
Independent	John B. Anderson	30,284	5.01%
Libertarian	Ed Clark	7,226	1.20%
Independent (Note: Affiliated with the Citizens Party nationally, officially listed in Utah as Independent)	Barry Commoner	1,009	0.17%
American	Percy L. Greaves	965	0.16%
American Independent	John Rarick	522	0.09%
Independent (Note: Affiliated with the Communist Party nationally, officially listed in Utah as Independent)	Gus Hall	139	0.02%
Socialist Workers	Clifton DeBerry	124	0.02%
Total votes		604,222	100.00%

=== Results by county ===
County	Ronald Reagan Republican		Jimmy Carter Democratic		John B. Anderson Independent		Ed Clark Libertarian		Other candidates Various parties		Margin		Total votes cast
County	#	%	#	%	#	%	#	%	#	%	#	%	Total votes cast
Beaver	1,477	68.47%	621	28.79%	43	1.99%	13	0.60%	3	0.14%	856	39.68%	2,157
Box Elder	12,500	82.72%	2,142	14.18%	306	2.03%	125	0.83%	38	0.25%	10,358	68.54%	15,111
Cache	20,251	78.69%	3,639	14.14%	1,494	5.81%	223	0.87%	128	0.50%	16,612	64.55%	25,735
Carbon	4,320	47.67%	4,317	47.63%	309	3.41%	104	1.15%	13	0.14%	3	0.04%	9,063
Daggett	290	69.88%	109	26.27%	10	2.41%	6	1.45%	0	0.00%	181	43.61%	415
Davis	45,695	78.98%	9,065	15.67%	2,253	3.89%	656	1.13%	190	0.33%	36,630	63.31%	57,859
Duchesne	3,827	79.41%	854	17.72%	87	1.81%	34	0.71%	17	0.35%	2,973	61.69%	4,819
Emery	3,076	67.18%	1,315	28.72%	90	1.97%	76	1.66%	22	0.48%	1,761	38.46%	4,579
Garfield	1,578	78.31%	375	18.61%	50	2.48%	9	0.45%	3	0.15%	1,203	59.70%	2,015
Grand	2,362	70.42%	703	20.96%	205	6.11%	60	1.79%	24	0.72%	1,659	49.46%	3,354
Iron	6,207	79.54%	1,242	15.91%	240	3.08%	83	1.06%	32	0.41%	4,965	63.63%	7,804
Juab	1,872	69.31%	720	26.66%	51	1.89%	50	1.85%	8	0.30%	1,152	42.65%	2,701
Kane	1,492	81.35%	256	13.96%	59	3.22%	20	1.09%	7	0.38%	1,236	67.39%	1,834
Millard	3,620	79.79%	795	17.52%	72	1.59%	37	0.82%	13	0.29%	2,825	62.27%	4,537
Morgan	1,985	81.52%	373	15.32%	42	1.72%	28	1.15%	7	0.29%	1,612	66.20%	2,435
Piute	551	76.63%	157	21.84%	3	0.42%	6	0.83%	2	0.28%	394	54.79%	719
Rich	762	81.15%	143	15.23%	18	1.92%	13	1.38%	3	0.32%	619	65.92%	939
Salt Lake	169,411	67.00%	58,472	23.13%	19,547	7.73%	3,881	1.53%	1,524	0.60%	110,939	43.87%	252,835
San Juan	2,774	76.00%	763	20.90%	72	1.97%	18	0.49%	23	0.63%	2,011	55.10%	3,650
Sanpete	5,143	77.76%	1,260	19.05%	112	1.69%	63	0.95%	36	0.54%	3,883	58.71%	6,614
Sevier	5,614	80.79%	1,112	16.00%	117	1.68%	54	0.78%	52	0.75%	4,502	64.79%	6,949
Summit	3,330	65.38%	1,184	23.25%	480	9.42%	79	1.55%	20	0.39%	2,146	42.13%	5,093
Tooele	6,024	62.03%	3,132	32.25%	391	4.03%	133	1.37%	32	0.33%	2,892	29.78%	9,712
Uintah	6,045	82.45%	1,049	14.31%	155	2.11%	67	0.91%	16	0.22%	4,996	68.14%	7,332
Utah	71,859	83.44%	12,166	14.13%	1,264	1.47%	589	0.68%	243	0.28%	59,693	69.31%	86,121
Wasatch	2,799	70.93%	994	25.19%	113	2.86%	32	0.81%	8	0.20%	1,805	45.74%	3,946
Washington	10,181	83.47%	1,678	13.76%	185	1.52%	87	0.71%	66	0.54%	8,503	69.71%	12,197
Wayne	835	76.05%	226	20.58%	15	1.37%	18	1.64%	4	0.36%	609	55.47%	1,098
Weber	43,807	69.98%	15,404	24.61%	2,501	4.00%	662	1.06%	225	0.36%	28,403	45.37%	62,599
Totals	439,687	72.77%	124,266	20.57%	30,284	5.01%	7,226	1.20%	2,759	0.46%	315,421	52.20%	604,222

==== Counties that flipped from Democratic to Republican ====
- Carbon
- Emery

== See also ==
- United States presidential elections in Utah
- Iran–Contra affair
- Nicaragua guerrilla war
- Presidency of Ronald Reagan
