= Paul Warner =

Paul Warner may refer to:

- Paul Warner (director), American film and theatre director
- Paul Warner (judge), federal magistrate judge for the United States District Court for the District of Utah
