= Scott Milne Matheson Sr. =

American lawyer (1897–1958)

Scott M. Matheson

United States Attorney for the District of Utah
- In office 1949–1953
- President: Harry S. Truman
- Preceded by: Brett Tolman
- Succeeded by: John W. Huber

Personal details
- Born: Scott Milne Matheson; August 9, 1897 Parowan, Utah, U.S.
- Died: October 4, 1958 (aged 61) Parowan, Utah, U.S.
- Spouse: Adele Adams (m. 1922)
- Children: 4, including Scott
- Education: University of Utah (BA); University of Chicago (LLB)

Military service
- Branch/service: United States Army
- Battles/wars: World War I

Scott Milne Matheson (August 9, 1897 – October 4, 1958) was the United States attorney for the District of Utah from 1949 to 1953.

== Life and career ==
Scott Milne Matheson was born on August 9, 1897, in Parowan, Utah, and served in the United States army during World War I. Matheson received his bachelor's degree from the University of Utah and then taught high school for a time in Parowan. He then went to Chicago where he earned a J.D. degree from the University of Chicago and did further studies at Northwestern University. In 1930, Matheson returned to Iron County, Utah, where he formed the law firm Matheson and Morris and also taught at the institution that is now Southern Utah University. From 1932 to 1934, he was the county attorney for Iron County. He was also a counselor in the presidency of the local stake of the Church of Jesus Christ of Latter-day Saints. In 1934, Matheson was made an assistant United States Attorney for the District of Utah. In 1949, he was appointed United States attorney for the District of Utah by President Harry S. Truman. In 1953, he resigned this office largely due to ill health. Matheson died on October 4, 1958, at age 61 from a heart attack.

Matheson is the father of Scott M. Matheson Jr., who served as Governor of Utah from 1977 to 1985. Matheson Sr. is the grandfather of U.S. Congressman Jim Matheson and federal judge Scott Matheson Jr.

== Sources ==
- Biography of Matheson from the United States attorney's office
