= 2004 Utah gubernatorial election =

- November 2, 2004
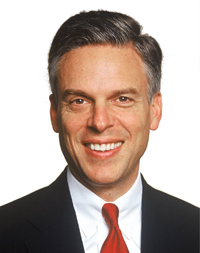

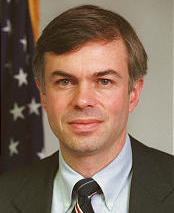
Nominee	Jon Huntsman Jr.	Scott Matheson Jr.
Party	Republican	Democratic
Running mate	Gary Herbert	Karen Hale
Popular vote	531,190	380,359
Percentage	57.74%	41.35%
- County results Huntsman: 50–60% 60–70% 70–80% Matheson: 50–60% 60–70%
Governor before election
Olene Walker
Republican
Elected Governor
Jon Huntsman, Jr.
Republican

The 2004 Utah gubernatorial election took place on November 2, 2004. The incumbent governor was Republican Olene S. Walker, who had become governor following Mike Leavitt's resignation to join the George W. Bush administration. However, Walker placed fourth in the Republican primary, far behind Jon Huntsman Jr. Huntsman won the nomination and went on to win the general election, carrying 25 of the 29 counties and winning 57.7% of the overall vote. This was the last time that a Democratic nominee for any statewide office has received forty percent or more of the popular vote, and the most recent election in which a Democratic gubernatorial nominee carried the counties of Carbon and Salt Lake.

== Background ==
In March 2003, Huntsman resigned his post in the Bush administration. In mid-August, three term incumbent Governor Mike Leavitt, whom Huntsman strongly supported, decided not to run for re-election to a fourth term, in order to become the Administrator of the Environmental Protection Agency under the Bush administration. Shortly thereafter, Huntsman filed papers to run for Governor of Utah. In November 2003, Lieutenant Governor Olene S. Walker became Utah's first female governor as Leavitt was confirmed to become EPA Administrator.

== Democratic nomination ==
Scott Matheson, Jr. entered the race on March 27, 2004. He won the May Democratic nomination unopposed.

== Republican primary ==
=== Convention ===
Candidates

- Gary Benson, businessman
- James Hansen, U.S. Congressman of Utah's 1st congressional district
- Parley Hellewell, State Senator
- Jon Huntsman, Jr., Trade Ambassador for President Bush's administration and former CEO of Huntsman Chemical Corporation
- Nolan Karras, State Representative
- Fred Lampropoulos, CEO of Merit Medical Systems
- Martin Stephens, State Representative
- Olene Walker, incumbent Governor

Results, first round

Republican Convention results
Party	Candidate	Votes	%
Republican	Jon Huntsman Jr.	959	27.98
Republican	Nolan Karras	607	17.71
Republican	Fred Lampropoulos	584	17.04
Republican	Olene Walker (incumbent)	495	14.44
Republican	Marty Stephens	380	11.09
Republican	James Hansen	278	8.11
Republican	Parley Hellewell	121	3.53
Republican	Gary Benson	4	0.12

Results, final round, instant-runoff

Republican Convention Results: Candidates Reduced to Two with Instant Runoff
Party	Candidate	Votes	%
Republican	Jon Huntsman Jr.	1,707	51.28
Republican	Nolan Karras	1,622	48.72

=== Primary ===
Candidates

- Jon Huntsman Jr., Trade Ambassador for President Bush's administration and former CEO of Huntsman Chemical Corporation
- Nolan Karras, State Representative

Campaign
Huntsman gained the endorsements from U.S. Senator Jake Garn and former U.S. President George H. W. Bush. Polls showed he was the front-runner.

Results

Republican primary results
Party	Candidate	Votes	%
Republican	Jon Huntsman Jr.	102,955	66.4
Republican	Nolan Karras	52,048	33.6
Total votes		155,003	100

== General election ==
=== Candidates ===
- Jon Huntsman, Jr. (R), Trade Ambassador for President Bush's administration and former CEO of Huntsman Chemical Corporation
- Scott Matheson, Jr. (D), U.S. Attorney

=== Campaign ===
Jon Huntsman Jr., a former advisor for U.S. Presidents Ronald Reagan, George H. W. Bush, and George W. Bush and son of industrialist Jon Huntsman, Sr.—the founder of Huntsman Chemical Corporation—filed papers to run for governor in September 2003. Jason Chaffetz was his campaign manager. In April 2004, Utah County Commissioner Gary Herbert decided to drop out of the Republican nomination and become Huntsman's running mate. Herbert helped Huntsman with the rural community. Huntsman campaigned on eliminating the sales tax on food and on ethics reform. He proposed that lawmakers have to disclose all their gifts, they have to report monthly their campaign contributions, and they can't work as lobbyists immediately after leaving state government. Huntsman opposed President Bush's No Child Left Behind Act. He said he would leave a label on the door of the governor's office "Economic Development Czar" if he's elected.

U.S. Attorney, former Harvard University professor, and dean of the University of Utah law school Scott Matheson, Jr. won the Democratic nomination unopposed. He is the son of former Utah Governor Scott Matheson who was also the last Democrat to be elected governor of the red state of Utah. He made education the number one priority. He explained how better schools would attract new business. In one television ad, he called himself "Utah's Education Governor." He criticized Huntsman for supporting school choice reform.

=== Predictions ===
Source	Ranking	As of
Sabato's Crystal Ball	Lean R	November 1, 2004

=== Polling ===
In a March Deseret Morning News/KSL-TV poll, Matheson was leading all the Republicans running for the nomination except for Huntsman and Walker. An early September Jones poll showed Huntsman leading 49%-39%. An October 6 Salt Lake Tribune poll showed Huntsman leading 49%-33%. An October 7 Deseret Morning News/KSL-TV poll showed Huntsman only leading 49%-40%. An October 29 Salt Lake Tribune poll showed Huntsman leading 50%-36%.

=== Fundraising ===
Huntsman raised a little over $3.5 million. Nearly $950,000 of the money raised was from his own personal loans and from family donations. He also raised 100,000 from the Republican Governors Association. Matheson raised almost $2.0 million. About one-fourth of Matheson's funds came from political committees, including $325,000 from the Democratic Governors Association.

=== Results ===
2004 Utah gubernatorial election
Party	Candidate	Votes	%	±%
Republican	Jon Huntsman Jr.	531,190	57.74%	+1.97%
Democratic	Scott Matheson Jr.	380,359	41.35%	−0.92%
Personal Choice	Ken Larsen	8,399	0.91%	
Write-ins		12	0.00%	
Majority		150,831	16.40%	+2.89%
Turnout		919,960		
Republican hold		Swing		

==== Results by county ====
County	Jon Huntsman Republican		Scott Matheson Democratic		Ken Larsen Personal Choice		Margin		Total votes cast
County	#	%	#	%	#	%	#	%	Total votes cast
Beaver	1,541	60.46%	991	38.88%	17	0.67%	550	21.58%	2,549
Box Elder	12,631	69.04%	5,497	30.05%	166	0.91%	7,134	39.00%	18,294
Cache	25,307	64.48%	13,660	34.81%	278	0.71%	11,647	29.68%	39,245
Carbon	3,232	38.43%	5,111	60.77%	68	0.81%	-1,879	-22.34%	8,411
Daggett	287	59.67%	194	40.33%	0	0.00%	93	19.33%	481
Davis	68,545	63.44%	38,726	35.84%	782	0.72%	29,819	27.60%	108,053
Duchesne	3,939	71.29%	1,550	28.05%	36	0.65%	2,389	43.24%	5,525
Emery	2,754	59.12%	1,848	39.67%	56	1.20%	906	19.45%	4,658
Garfield	1,562	72.99%	558	26.07%	20	0.93%	1,004	46.92%	2,140
Grand	1,811	43.92%	2,239	54.31%	73	1.77%	-428	-10.38%	4,123
Iron	10,673	69.59%	4,526	29.51%	137	0.89%	6,147	40.08%	15,336
Juab	1,995	58.80%	1,363	40.17%	35	1.03%	632	18.63%	3,393
Kane	2,168	71.74%	823	27.23%	31	1.03%	1,345	44.51%	3,022
Millard	3,150	64.89%	1,654	34.07%	50	1.03%	1,496	30.82%	4,854
Morgan	2,535	66.15%	1,272	33.19%	25	0.65%	1,263	32.96%	3,832
Piute	517	68.39%	237	31.35%	2	0.26%	280	37.04%	756
Rich	706	68.88%	317	30.93%	2	0.20%	389	37.95%	1,025
Salt Lake	168,818	46.81%	188,002	52.12%	3,851	1.07%	-19,184	-5.32%	360,681 (Note: Includes 10 write-in votes)
San Juan	2,555	52.45%	2,244	46.07%	72	1.48%	311	6.38%	4,871
Sanpete	5,441	65.32%	2,799	33.60%	90	1.08%	2,642	31.72%	8,330
Sevier	5,059	66.64%	2,470	32.54%	62	0.82%	2,589	34.11%	7,591
Summit	6,151	40.75%	8,822	58.44%	123	0.81%	-2,671	-17.69%	15,096
Tooele	9,181	55.71%	7,106	43.12%	192	1.17%	2,075	12.59%	16,479
Uintah	7,345	74.63%	2,399	24.38%	98	1.00%	4,946	50.25%	9,842
Utah	107,429	72.90%	38,921	26.41%	1,003	0.68%	68,508	46.49%	147,355 (Note: Includes 2 write-in votes)
Wasatch	4,353	58.52%	3,032	40.76%	53	0.71%	1,321	17.76%	7,438
Washington	31,295	72.25%	11,683	26.97%	335	0.77%	19,612	45.28%	43,313
Wayne	880	65.77%	458	34.23%	0	0.00%	422	31.54%	1,338
Weber	39,330	54.68%	31,857	44.29%	742	1.03%	7,473	10.39%	71,929
Total	531,190	57.74%	380,359	41.35%	8,399	0.91%	150,831	16.40%	919,960

Counties that flipped from Democratic to Republican

- San Juan (largest municipality: Blanding)

== See also ==
Election Results – Utah Lieutenant Governor's Office
