= Morgan Philpot =

American politician (born 1971)

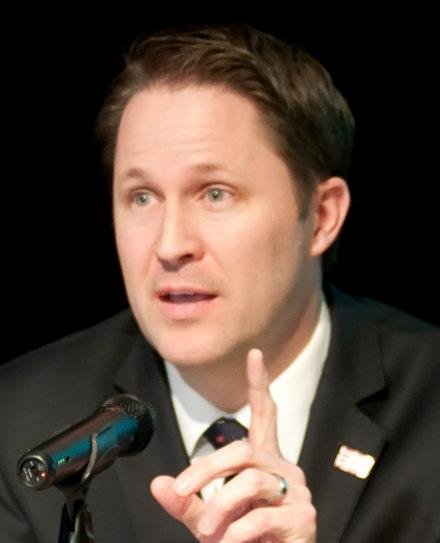

Member of the Utah House of Representatives from the 45th district
- In office January 1, 2001 – September 30, 2004
- Preceded by: Melvin R. Brown
- Succeeded by: Mark W. Walker

Personal details
- Born: Jay Morgan Philpot; July 30, 1971 (age 54) Molalla, Oregon, U.S.
- Party: Republican
- Spouse: Natalie
- Education: University of Utah (1988); Ave Maria School of Law (2007)
- Occupation: Attorney

Jay Morgan Philpot (born July 30, 1971) is an American attorney and Republican Party politician. He was a member of the Utah House of Representatives from 2001 to 2004, representing District 45 in Salt Lake County from 2001 to 2004. He was vice-chair of the Utah Republican Party from 2009 and 2010. Philpot was the 2010 Republican nominee for Utah's 2nd congressional district, losing to Democrat Jim Matheson. He unsuccessfully ran for governor of Utah in 2012 and Utah State Senate in 2016.

== Early life and education ==
Philpot is a native of Molalla, Oregon. While attending the University of Utah, he interned at the White House in 1997.

== Political career ==
Having participated in Utah's caucus/convention system as a precinct chair, state delegate, and county delegate, he successfully ran for a seat in the Utah House of Representatives in 2000. He took office in 2001, and was re-elected in 2002. Just before the end of his second term, he resigned his seat in order to attend Ave Maria School of Law in Ann Arbor, Michigan.

Upon graduation in 2007, he returned to Utah where he worked for the Utah Attorney General's office before accepting a position as the General Counsel and Government Affairs director for Reagan Outdoor Advertising.

In early 2009, Philpot declared his intention to run against the incumbent vice-chair of the state Republican party. He claimed victory with 52% of the vote. While in office, he helped to create a Web Communications committee, which dramatically increased the party's digital engagement.

== Unsuccessful campaigns for Congress, governor, and state Senate ==
Philpot resigned as Utah Republican Party vice-chair, effective January 23, 2010, and announced his intention to run for Utah's 2nd congressional district in the 2010 election, challenging incumbent Democrat Jim Matheson. In the November 2010 election, Matheson defeated Philpot, 50.49% to 46.06%.

In December 2011, Philpot announced his plans to run for governor of Utah in the 2012 election, challenging incumbent Republican Governor Gary Herbert. Philpot said his chief issues included challenging the Patient Protection and Affordable Care Act (ACA) and federal involvement in education. Philpot said that if he were elected he would aggressively confront the U.S. federal government, deeming the federal government an "over-reaching tyrant" and the Obama administration as "socialist." He said that Utah should attempt to "nullify" the ACA and should seek to block federal eminent domain of lands, even if it meant risking arrest. He criticized Herbert for aligning Utah with the Common Core standards, and framed the standards as an infringement of Utah's sovereignty. At the Utah state Republican Convention in 2012, challengers to Herbert included Philpot, Republican state representative Ken Sumsion, David Kirkham, William Skokos, and Lane Ronnow. Herbert and Philpot advanced to a second ballot, where Herbert won with 63% to Philpot's 23%.

In 2016, Philpot ran for Utah State Senate for a Utah County seat; he was defeated by Dan Hemmert.

== Lawyer for 2016 Malheur National Wildlife Refuge militants ==
Philpot became the lawyer for Ammon Bundy in May 2016, defending Bundy on federal criminal charges arising from the 2016 occupation of the Malheur National Wildlife Refuge. Ammon Bundy was acquitted in October 2016, following a jury trial.

Philpot also represents Jeanette Finicum, the wife of Robert LaVoy Finicum, in her wrongful death suit against the U.S. government. LaVoy Finicum, an Arizona rancher, was the spokesman for a group of armed militants during the Malheur NWR occupation in 2016. He was fatally shot by Oregon state troopers after he crashed his pickup truck near a roadblock while state troopers and FBI agents arrested the militants. Finicum was armed with a loaded 9 mm handgun; he was killed after he walked away from his truck and reached for the inner pocket of his jacket. An investigation by local law enforcement found the shooting to be justified. The bulk of Jeanette Finicum's claims were dismissed in 2021.

== Personal life ==
Morgan lives in Alpine, Utah with his wife, Natalie, and their five children. In February 2012, Philpot walked away uninjured after a crash sent him and two campaign staffers down a 100-foot embankment.
