= Loch Achaidh na h-Inich =

Lake in the Highlands of Scotland

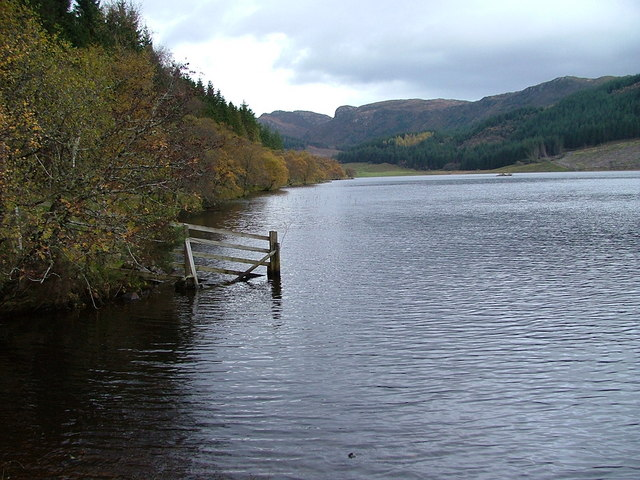

- Location within Scotland
- Location: Scotland
- Coordinates: 57.3159°N 5.6341°W
- Type: freshwater loch
- Basin countries: Scotland

Loch Achaidh na h-Inich is a freshwater loch in Scotland, located around 3 kilometres (1.9 mi) south-south-east of Plockton, 2 kilometres (1.2 mi) east of Duirinish, 2 km north-north-east of Balmacara, and half a kilometre south-east of Loch Lundie. The field at the Northern end of Loch Achaidh na h-Inich is called 'Ach an Dà Thearnaidh' (the Field of the Two Descents) and was the traditional gathering ground of Clann MacMhathain, translated into English as Clan Matheson, where the fighting men of the clan would assemble when summoned by the ‘fiery cross’ being carried by a clansman.
