= Paul Warner (judge) =

American judge (born 1949)

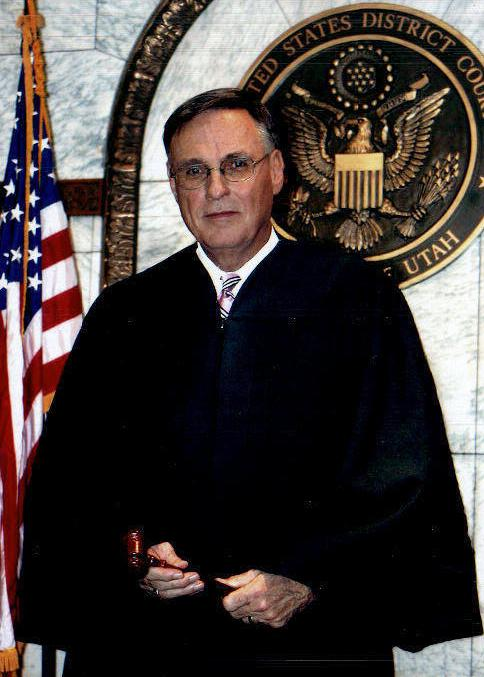

Magistrate Judge of the District of Utah
- In office February 19, 2006 – 2020

United States Attorney for the District of Utah
- In office 1998–2006
- President: Bill Clinton; George W. Bush
- Preceded by: Scott Matheson Jr.
- Succeeded by: Brett Tolman

Personal details
- Born: Paul Michael Warner; June 11, 1949 (age 77) Seattle, Washington, U.S.
- Children: 4

Paul Michael Warner (born June 11, 1949) is an American lawyer who served as a United States magistrate judge for the United States District Court for the District of Utah. He was appointed to this position on February 19, 2006. He retired in 2020.

== Early life and education ==
Paul Michael Warner was born on June 11, 1949 in Seattle. He grew up in Salt Lake City, Utah and graduated from East High School. He then served a two-year mission in the Philippines for the Church of Jesus Christ of Latter-day Saints. Warner received his Bachelor of Arts degree in English from Brigham Young University (BYU) in 1973. He graduated in the charter class of the J. Reuben Clark Law School at BYU in 1976. He received a Master's degree in Public Administration from the Marriott School of Management at BYU in 1984. He teaches at the BYU law school as an adjunct professor, teaching criminal trial practice, among other classes.

== Legal career ==
=== Military service ===
After graduating from law school, Warner served six years as a trial lawyer in the Judge Advocate General Corps of the United States Navy, acting as both prosecutor and defense counsel, and eventually becoming Department Head and Chief Defense Counsel of the Naval JAG in San Diego. He continued his military service and was in the Judge Advocate General Branch of the Utah Army National Guard for 25 years. He retired in 2006 and currently is a Colonel and the State Staff Judge Advocate. He received the Legion of Merit and the Army Meritorious Service Medal with two oak leaf clusters in recognition of his long-term service, including his work in mobilizing members of the Guard for service in Operation Desert Storm.

=== Assistant Utah attorney general ===
In 1982, Warner was appointed as an Assistant attorney general of Utah. He served nearly six and one-half years in that office. He was a member of the litigation division for four years, three of which he served as division chief. He then served for two and one-half years as Associate Chief Deputy Attorney General. While employed in the Attorney General's office, he was primarily involved with state law and public policy issues.

Warner worked on numerous high-profile cases, including the Hi-Fi murders. This was a criminal case in which three United States Air Force airmen committed murder, rape, and robbery in the Hi-Fi shop in Ogden, Utah. William Andrews and Dale Selby Pierre took five people hostage at the store and killed three of them. Pierre raped one of the female hostages before killing her. The two who survived had significant injuries. Keith Roberts assisted Pierre and Andrews with the robbery, but not with the other crimes. After the trial, Andrews and Pierre were found guilty and sentenced to death.

Warner also worked on the Arthur Gary Bishop murder cases. Bishop had a history of molesting children for many years before he was caught. His crimes advanced to murder, and he confessed to murdering five young boys from 1979 to 1983. He was tried and found guilty of five counts of aggravated murder, five counts of aggravated kidnapping, and one count of sexually abusing a minor, and was sentenced to death. Bishop was executed by lethal injection at Utah State Prison in Point of the Mountain on June 10, 1988.

=== U.S. attorney ===
Warner joined the United States Attorney's Office for the District of Utah in 1989. He held the positions of first assistant United States attorney, chief of the Criminal Division, and Violent Crimes and Hate Crimes coordinator. On July 29, 1998 he was nominated by President Bill Clinton and supported by Senator Orrin Hatch to be the United States attorney for the District of Utah. Paul Warner was confirmed by the United States Senate and was sworn in on July 31, 1998. He was one of the only two U.S. attorneys nationwide to be retained by President George W. Bush after Bush's election. Warner's taking office created a vacancy in the Criminal Chief's position, and he appointed veteran prosecutor Richard Lambert to the post. He also named Carlie Christensen as the new Civil Chief. She was the first female division chief in the office's history. He was Chairman of the United States Attorney General's Advisory Committee of U.S. Attorneys from 2001-2003.

Warner was the U.S. Attorney during the September 11 attacks in 2001, and played an important role in advising the government on counter terrorism issues following the terrorist attack. Warner's office had a major role in the security planning of the events during the Salt Lake City 2002 Olympic Winter Games. Because the Olympics were held four months after 9/11, there was a tremendous public safety effort on the federal, state and local level. Regarding illegal immigration, Warner had proposed an emphasis on prosecuting aggravated re-entry cases when he was criminal chief. The office's effort expanded over time into cases involving more conduct such as alien smuggling, alien harboring, transporting, and passport fraud. In addition to "Operation Safe Travel" and the commercial driver's license initiative, the Office mounted a consistent on-going immigration enforcement effort.

=== Legal activities ===
Warner served on the Utah Supreme Court Advisory Committee on the rules of Civil Procedure, and he is on the Utah State Bar Mentoring Committee. Paul Warner has been involved in numerous professional organizations, including serving as a Master of the Bench in the American Inns of Court and Chairman of the Board of Visitors for the BYU Law School. He has received multiple military and civilian professional awards, including his election as a Fellow in the American College of Trial Lawyers.

=== Federal judicial service ===
In December 2005, Warner accepted an appointment as the fourth United States magistrate judge in the District of Utah. He was sworn in in February 2006. Warner retired from the bench in Spring 2020.

== Notable cases/rulings ==
=== U.S. attorney/prosecutor cases ===
In 2002 the U.S. Attorney's Office filed the nation's first-ever Racketeer Influenced and Corrupt Organizations Act (RICO) prosecution of a street gang on drug-related charges. The case was "United States of America v. Tyrese Sharod Smith", 413 F.3d 1253 (10th Cir. 2005). The RICO conspiracy statute proved to be a particularly potent tool against two virulent criminal gangs. Ten members or significant associates of the King Mafia Disciples, a street and prison gang patterned after the Gangster Disciple Nation of Chicago, were indicted in 2002, charged with violations of the RICO conspiracy statute and with violent crime in aid of racketeering activity. KMD members engaged in drive-by shootings, walk-up shootings, home invasion robberies, drug trafficking crimes, and ordering murders from behind prison walls. One of the predicate acts, a murder ordered by the leader of KMD, was committed by members who killed a 19-year-old-boy with a sawed-off shotgun. This boy was mistakenly identified as a member of a rival gang. The leader of KMD was convicted after an eight-day trial and sentenced to life imprisonment. The nine other defendants pleaded and were sentenced to long terms.

Litigation involving the Grand Staircase–Escalante National Monument was a significant civil case that was during Warner's time. The case was "Utah Association of Counties v. George W. Bush", 455 F.3d 1094 (10th Cir. 2006). President Clinton's controversial creation of the Grand Staircase–Escalante National Monument turned into litigation as several states-rights advocacy groups sued to have the designation reversed. Division Chief Carlie Christensen headed a team with DOJ attorneys who, in multi-year litigation, gained a favorable judgment in the District Court and an affirmance by the Tenth Circuit.

Warner also prosecuted a case involving a bombing at Dixie State College in St. George, "U.S. v. Robert Allen Little Jr.", 132 F.3d 43 (10th Cir. 1997), and a case involving cross burning in Salt Lake City His specialty as a prosecutor was civil rights cases.

=== Magistrate judge cases ===
Warner presided over various proceedings in the case "United States of America v. Jeffrey Mowen", 2:09-CR-00098 (Utah 2010), which involved a man who used Morse code to allegedly order murders. Jeffrey Lane Mowen appeared before Warner, seeking a release from custody pending his trial on charges of wire fraud, witness tampering and retaliating against a witness, and solicitation to commit a crime of violence. Mowen had been arrested after scamming investors out of more than $18 million in a Ponzi scheme. Federal prosecutors stated that Mowen attempted to have four former investors murdered by a white supremacist so they couldn't testify against him while he was in the Davis County Jail. Prosecutors also stated that Mowen used Morse code in one instance to dictate a letter to another inmate ordering the murders. Judge Paul Warner denied Mowen's request for pretrial release.

Warner also presided over many drug and child pornography prosecutions. In one case, a TV producer was arrested in 2007 at the Salt Lake City International Airport after child pornography was found in his luggage. Kevin Stewart McMahan was charged in federal court with one count each of possession and transportation of child pornography. Judge Warner agreed to release McMahan from custody pending trial under strict guidelines, such as wearing an ankle monitoring bracelet, because McMahan's job required extensive traveling, and he was not deemed to be a flight risk.

Another case involved Idaho State University history professor Thomas Francis Hale who was accused of a hantavirushoax in 2006. Federal prosecutors said the professor sent a fax suggesting that federal bankruptcy trustee Elizabeth Loveridge should check out the "Hazmat" that would be coming in an orange envelope. A few days later, an envelope arrived with "caution" written on it. There was a note inside that said "Termites or hantavirus from mice?" Assistant U.S. Attorney Trina Higgins said the note was wrapped around what was believed to be termites, and it didn't contain the hantavirus. The note was part of a federal indictment that was handed down against Hale, charging him with making the phony hantavirus hoax, lying to federal authorities and hiding assets during bankruptcy proceedings. Hale was arrested by the FBI's Joint Terrorism Task Force at the Salt Lake City International Airport after stepping off a flight from Chicago. Hale appeared before Judge Paul Warner, and he pleaded not guilty to the charges. Judge Warner ordered Hale to be released from the Salt Lake County Jail with a number of conditions of release, including that he have no contact with Loveridge except through her attorney and that he undergo mental health therapy.

In another case, a Southwest Airlines co-pilot faced federal DUI charges in 2006. A federal complaint was filed against Carl Fulton, who was accused of operating a plane under the influence of alcohol. Fulton was pulled from the cockpit of a Southwest Airlines Flight preparing to leave Salt Lake City bound for Phoenix after a Transportation Security Administration screener detected alcohol on his breath. The screener followed Fulton and watched him board the flight. Airport police were called and Fulton was asked to step outside the plane, according to a complaint filed in federal court. Fulton made an appearance before Judge Paul Warner, and he was charged with one count of operation of a common carrier under the influence of alcohol or other drugs. The charge carries a maximum penalty of 15 years in prison and up to $250,000 in fines.

== Personal life ==
Warner is married and has four children; two boys and two girls.

== Publications and speeches ==
Warner has given hundreds of speeches, and he has testified before the U.S. Sentencing Commission. He has spoken at national conventions on Project Safe Neighborhoods and as at numerous local functions, service clubs, and routine bar presentations. He has been the speaker every year for the past 12 years at Weber State College on the topic of American values and citizenship.
