= Alexander Matheson =

Alexander Matheson may refer to:

- Sir Alexander Matheson, 1st Baronet (1805–1886), Scottish businessman and Liberal politician
- Sir Alexander Matheson, 3rd Baronet (1861–1929), member of the Senate of Australia
- Alexander Matheson (pharmacist), British businessman and Lord Lieutenant of the Western Isles
- Alexander E. Matheson (1868–1931), American legislator and jurist
- Alexander Wallace Matheson (1903–1976), Prince Edward Island politician
