= Rachel Matheson =

Rachel Matheson or Mathson may refer to:

- Rachel Matheson, character in Under the Mountain (TV miniseries)
- Rachel Matheson, character in Revolution (TV series)
- Rachel Mathson, beauty pageant contestant
