= Brett Tolman =

American lawyer (born 1970)

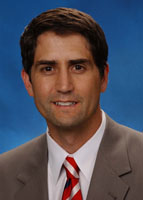

United States Attorney for the District of Utah
- In office July 2006 – December 2009
- President: George W. Bush; Barack Obama
- Preceded by: Paul Warner
- Succeeded by: David Barlow

Personal details
- Born: Brett L. Tolman; June 10, 1970 (age 56)
- Education: Brigham Young University (BA, JD)
- Occupation: Lawyer

Brett L. Tolman (born June 10, 1970) is an American lawyer. He served as a United States Attorney for the District of Utah from July 2006 to December 2009. Before becoming U.S. Attorney, Tolman worked as counsel in the Senate Judiciary Committee for committee chairs Orrin Hatch (R-UT) and then Arlen Specter (R-PA) during the 109th United States Congress.

== Early career ==
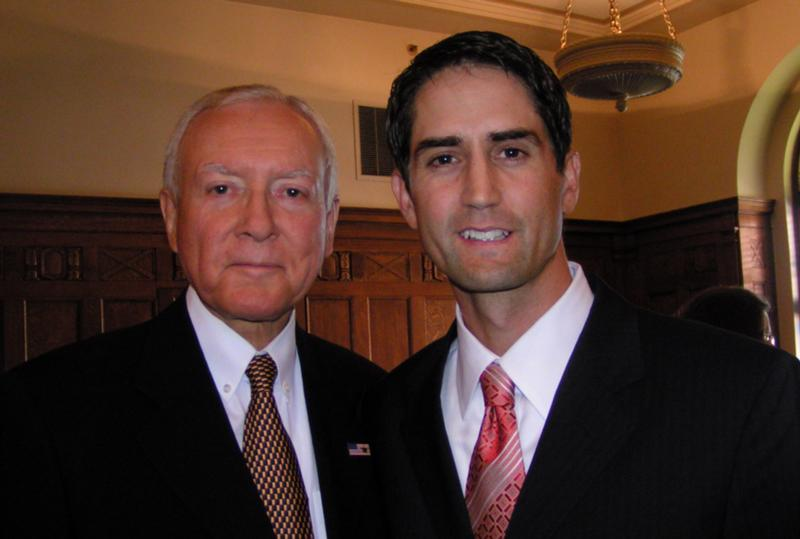
Tolman with Orrin Hatch in 2006

Tolman received a Bachelor of Arts degree in English from Brigham Young University in 1994, and his Juris Doctor degree cum laude from the J. Reuben Clark Law School in 1998. Tolman clerked for U.S. District Chief Judge Dee Benson of the United States District Court for the District of Utah from 1998 to 2000. Tolman then served four years as an assistant U.S. Attorney in the District of Utah under U.S. Attorney Paul Warner. In 2003, he began work on the staff of U.S. Sen. Orrin Hatch, (R-UT), chairman of the Senate Judiciary Committee. Later, Tolman staffed for Sen. Arlen Specter (R-PA) after Specter became judiciary chairman. While working for Senators Hatch and Specter, Tolman was Counsel for Crime and Terrorism, which included work on drafting and negotiating passage of the USA PATRIOT Act reauthorization.

== U.S. Attorney ==
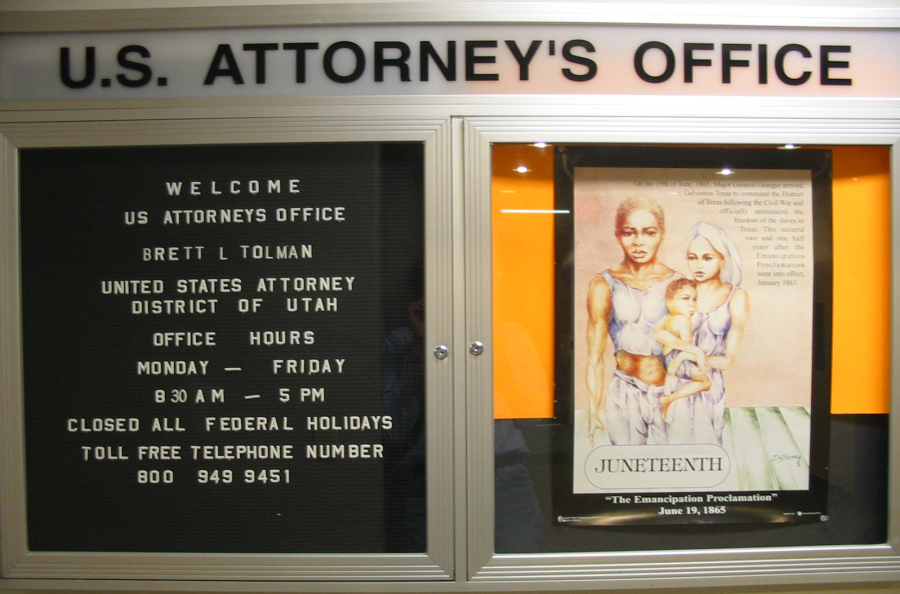

On January 25, 2006, U.S. Attorney for the District of Utah Paul Warner announced he would step down to become the newly created fourth U.S. Magistrate Judge for the District of Utah. A struggle over who would succeed him in office ensued, the two candidates being Tolman and Kyle Sampson, then Attorney General Alberto Gonzales's chief of staff at the Department of Justice. Both Tolman and Sampson are Utah natives who had graduated from Brigham Young University. While Gonzales and the White House favored Sampson, Tolman received support from Senator Orrin Hatch (R-UT), Senate Judiciary Committee chairman Arlen Specter (R-PA), Senate Majority Leader Bill Frist (R-TN), Senate Majority Whip Mitch McConnell (R-KY), and Senate Judiciary Committee member Mike DeWine (R-OH). Hatch made a personal appeal to Attorney General Gonzales to drop his nomination of Kyle Sampson. On June 9, 2006, President Bush nominated Tolman to the Utah post, and on July 21, 2006, the Senate confirmed Tolman by voice vote.

== Private legal career ==
In December 2009, Tolman resigned and joined the Salt Lake City law firm Ray Quinney & Nebeker. In 2019, Tolman resigned from Ray Quinney & Nebeker to start his own firm, the Tolman Group, which focuses on public policy and government reform. Tolman has been featured on Fox News discussing current events.

=== Criminal justice reform ===
Tolman was a leading supporter of the First Step Act, a bipartisan criminal justice bill passed by the 115th United States Congress and signed by President Donald Trump in December 2018. Tolman has been a prominent advocate for clemency requests, including for former Arkansas legislator Jeremy Young Hutchinson; media personalities Todd Chrisley and Julie Chrisley; and Silk Road founder Ross Ulbricht.
