= Clan Matheson =

Highland Scottish clan

Clan Matheson, No Mathas
- Clann Mhathain
- Motto: Fac et spera (Do and hope)

Profile
- Region: Scottish Highlands
- District: Lochalsh, Sutherland
- Plant badge: Broom
- Animal: The lion

Chief
- Sir Alexander Fergus Matheson of Matheson
- The 8th baronet of Lochalsh
- Historic seat: Fort Matheson, at Loch Achaidh na h-Inich
Septs of Clan Matheson, No Mathas
Mac Mahon, Mathieson, Matheson, Mathieson, Mathewson, Matteson, Matthewson, Mathie, MacBurnie, McBurney, McBurnie, Bainrson, Mingasson, MacMahthain, Mathieson, MacBurnie, MacMath, Massie, Moannach, Matheus, Mathyson, Massey
Clan branches
Matheson of Lochalsh, Matheson of Bennetsfield, Mingasson
Allied clans
Clan Donald
Clan Mackenzie
Clan Sutherland
Clan Macrae
Clan Mackintosh
Rival clans
Clan MacLeod
Clan Ross
Clan Gunn

Clan Matheson (Scottish Gaelic: Clann Mhathain [ˈkʰl̪ˠãũn̪ˠ ˈvãhɛn]) is a Highland Scottish clan.

== History ==
=== Origins of the clan ===
The surname Matheson has more than one anglicization of its Scottish Gaelic derivation. The historian Black attributes Matheson to the Gaelic Mic Mhathghamhuin which means son of the bear, and the clan chief's arms carry two bears as supporters. It has also been suggested that MacMhathain means son of the heroes. The Scottish Lowland version of Matheson means simply son of Matthew.

Chiefs of Clan Matheson are descendants of Kenneth the first MacAlpin, king of Scotland. The Mathesons were granted lands by the Celtic Earls of Ross and settled around Loch Alsh, Lochcarron and Kintail. In 1262 a Scottish army led by Alexander III of Scotland invaded the Isle of Skye in order to free the isles from the kings of Norway and one of the leaders of this expedition is recorded as Kjarnac or Cormac Macmaghan. Following the Battle of Largs in 1263 the Western Isles came to be dominated by the Clan Donald whose chiefs were the Lords of the Isles and the Clan Matheson sided with them.

=== 15th and 16th centuries ===
In 1411 the Clan Matheson fought for Domhnall of Islay, Lord of the Isles at the Battle of Harlaw where the clan chief, Alasdair was captured. The Clan Matheson was then said to have numbered over two thousand warriors. Macmaken supported Alexander of Islay, Earl of Ross who was suspected of treason by James I of Scotland. As a result, the earl was seized by the king at Inverness in 1427. Matheson was also arrested by the king, and was executed.

As the Lords of the Isles lost power so did the Mathesons. The Mathesons then found themselves involved in the feuding between the Clan MacDonald and the Clan Mackenzie. Iain Dubh Matheson was killed defending the Mackenzie stronghold Eilean Donan Castle, of which he had become constable of after marrying the widow of Sir Dugald Mackenzie. Dougal MacRuadhri Matheson sat in Parliament and was Prior of Beauly between 1498 and 1514.

According to the MS Account of the Gunns a historic manuscript, the Clan Matheson fought alongside the Clan Mackay and the Polsons at the Battle of Torran Dubh in 1517 against the Clan Gunn, Clan Ross and the Murrays of Aberscross.

All genealogies of the clan agree that the next chief was the undisputed Murdoch Buidhe (yellow haired) who died in about 1602.

=== 17th and 18th centuries ===
Murdoch had two sons, Roderick and Dugald. Duglad was styled of Balmacara and he rose to become chamberlain of Lochalsh in 1631. Dugald was the ancestor of John Matheson of Attadale whose grandson, John, was forced to sell their Highland estates.

Another branch of the Clan Matheson who had settled on the north side of Loch Shin had been ballies to the Earls of Sutherland in the late 15th century. Donald Matheson of Shin fought against the Jacobites during the Jacobite rising of 1715. Meanwhile, the chiefship of the clan had descended through a line who were descended from Dugald of Balmacara's elder brother, Roderick Matherson. They acquired lands on the Black Isle that were known as Bennetsfield. Unlike his cousins in Sutherland, John Matheson, second of Bennetsfield was a Jacobite who fought at the Battle of Culloden in 1746. Of the members of the Clan Matheson who supported the British Government during the Jacobite rising of 1745, it is recorded that a Kenneth Mathisom was a lieutenant in the Independent Highland Company that was formed by the town of Inverness and a John Mathison was also a lieutenant in one of the Independent Highland Companies formed by the Clan Mackenzie chief, also to support the British Government.

=== Current chief ===
The current chief is Sir Alexander Fergus Matheson, 8th Baronet, who now resides in Norfolk, England.

== Septs ==
Bairnson, MacBirnie, MacBurnie, McBurnie, McBurney, McMath, MacMahon, McMaken, MacMath, MacMathon, MacMhathain, Massey, Massie, Matheson, Mathewson, Mathie, Mathieson, Mathison, Mathyson, Matthews, Matthewson, Moannach, McLaughlin.

There is also a branch of Clan Matheson that reside in Norway. They went to Norway as mercenaries with Major Jacob Jacob Matheson in 1612, fighting for the Scots. They were captured, but did not return to Scotland. They were later ennobled by the Dano-Norwegian crown as counts and barons.

== Clan Castles ==
- Fort Matheson, now a ruin, was the original seat of the Chief of the Clan Matheson.
- Lews Castle near Stornoway on the Isle of Lewis was built by the family of Sir James Matheson who bought the property in 1846 and was originally the site Seaforth Lodge.
- Ardross Castle was originally held by the Clan Munro but later passed to the Mathesons.
- Bennetsfield near Munlochy in Easter Ross is the site of a castle or old house. It was held by the Mathesons from the end of the seventeenth century and this branch of the clan became the chiefs. John Matheson, 2nd of Benetsfield fought for the Jacobites at the Battle of Culloden in 1746, although most of his clan supported the government.
- Shiness near Lairg in Sutherland is the site of a castle or old house. It was held by the Mathesons from the fifteenth century who were ballies to the Earls of Sutherland. Donald Matheson of Shiness fought against the Jacobites in the Jacobite rising of 1715. The property went to the Dukes of Sutherland in 1809.

== Clan chiefs ==
| Name | Dates | Comments |
Lochalsh branch
| Mathghamhain | fl. 1225 | |
| Kenneth | died 1304 | |
| Murdoch | fl. 14th century | |
| Duncan | fl. 14th century | |
| Murdoch | fl. 14th century | |
| Duncan | fl. 14th century | |
| Murdoch | fl. c. 1400 | |
| Alasdair | died 1427 or 1438 | Either executed by King James I in 1427 or killed by the MacKays at Battle of Cnoc nan Catach in 1438 |
| Iain Dubh the elder | died 1490s | |
| Alasdair MacRuaidhri | died 1506 | |
| Iain Dubh the younger | died 1539 | Chamberlain of Eilean Donan Castle |
| Dugald Roy | fl. 1540s | |
| Murdoch Buidhe | fl. 1530s–1570s | |
| Roderick (1st of Fernaig) | died before 1600 | |
| Iain (2nd of Fernaig) | fl. 17th century | Also known as Iain McRuari Mhic Mhathoin |
| Iain Og | fl. 1660s | |
Bennetsfield branch
| Iain Mor | died 1715 | |
| Alexander (1st of Bennetsfield) | chief 1715–1754 | |
| John (2nd of Bennetsfield) | 1754–1768 | Present at the Battle of Culloden in 1746 |
| Colin (3rd of Bennetsfield) | 1763–1825 | |
| John (4th of Bennetsfield) | 1825–1843 | |
| James Brook Young (5th of Bennetsfield) | 1843–1886 | |
| Eric Grant (6th of Bennetsfield) | 1886–1899 | |
| Heylin Fraser (7th of Bennetsfield) | 1899–1945 | |
| Bertram Heylin (8th of Bennetsfield) | 1945–1975 | |
Lochalsh branch
| Sir Torquhil Alexander Matheson, 6th Baronet | 1975–1993 | |
| Sir Fergus John Matheson, 7th Baronet | 1993–2017 | |
| Sir Alexander Fergus Matheson, 8th Baronet | 2017– | The current chief |

== See also ==
- Scottish clan
- Matheson Baronets
