= Norma Matheson =

American politician (1929–2019)

First Lady of Utah
- In role January 3, 1977 – January 7, 1985
- Governor: Scott M. Matheson
- Preceded by: Lucybeth Rampton
- Succeeded by: Colleen Bangerter

Personal details
- Born: Norma Louise Warenski; September 13, 1929 Nephi, Utah, U.S.
- Died: July 28, 2019 (aged 89) Salt Lake City, Utah, U.S.
- Party: Democratic
- Spouse: Scott M. Matheson (m. 1951; died 1990)
- Children: 4, including Scott and Jim
- Education: University of Utah (BS)

Norma Louise Matheson (September 13, 1929 – July 28, 2019) was an American politician, political strategist, activist, and conservationist who served as the first lady of Utah from 1977 to 1985 as wife of Governor Scott M. Matheson. She was considered a pioneer for women in Utah politics and the matriarch of the Matheson political family. Her prominent role in state politics earned her the nickname "godmother" of the Utah Democratic Party.

== Biography ==
=== Early life ===
Matheson was born Norma Louise Warenski in Nephi, Utah, on September 13, 1929, to Leo Carl and Ardella (Sabine) Warenski. Her father was a rural doctor. As a child, she moved with her parents to Philadelphia and San Francisco so her father could attend medical school to become an obstetrician.

The family returned to live in Salt Lake City, where Warenski attended the city's East High School. She met her future husband, Scott M. Matheson, at the age of 16 while both were students at East High School. Matheson received her bachelor's degree in zoology from the University of Utah.

On August 25, 1951, she married Scott Matheson while he was still studying at Stanford Law School. The couple moved back to Utah and constructed a home next to her parents house. They had four children: Scott Matheson Jr. (born 1953), Lu Matheson, Jim Matheson (born 1960), and Tom Matheson. Norma Matheson raised the children while serving as president of the League of Women Voters.

=== Career ===
Scott Matheson worked as a Salt Lake County Prosecutor and a lawyer for the Union Pacific Railroad before entering politics in 1976. That same year, incumbent Utah Governor Cal Rampton declined to seek re-election for a potential fourth term, leading Scott Matheson to enter the gubernatorial election. By her own accounts, Norma Matheson was the last in her family to endorse her husband's decision to enter the race.

Norma Matheson served as First Lady of Utah from 1977 to 1985 during the two terms of her husband. Matheson focused on projects related to children, the elderly and education during her tenure as first lady. She visited every senior center in Utah to call attention to issues affecting the state's senior citizen population. Matheson also oversaw the restoration of the Utah Governor's Mansion, the official residence of the Governor and their families. Years after leaving the position, Matheson also assisted then-Governor Mike Mike Leavitt and First Lady Jackie Leavitt with their restoration efforts of the governor's residence following a fire in 1993.

Scott Matheson was diagnosed with multiple myeloma in 1989, which was believed to have been caused by radioactive fallout from nuclear testing in nearby Nevada. Scott M. Matheson died from the illness on October 7, 1990, at just 61-years old, leaving the former first lady a widow. At the time of his death, Matheson was quoted as saying, "All I wanted was 10 more years."

Following her husband's death, Matheson continued to champion numerous political, civic, environmental, and philanthropic causes. She was highly active as a political strategist for the national and state Democratic Party, earning her the nickname "matriarch" of the Utah Democratic Party. Matheson recruited and campaigned for candidates for state and national office. Meghan Holbrook, head of the state party, credited Matheson with the success of both of the party and the Matheson family in politics, calling her "politically shrewd", saying, "She could play three-dimensional chess. I know she advised her sons, and their father was a terrific man, but I think Norma had the political instinct in the family. And all in a velvet glove." In 2000, Norma Matheson recommended her son, James David Matheson, as a candidate for Utah's 2nd congressional district during a brainstorming session. James David Matheson won the 2000 congressional race and served seven terms in the United States House of Representatives.

Matheson served as a longtime member of the board of directors for The Nature Conservancy, an environmental organization. During her tenure, The Nature Conservancy acquired wetlands outside Moab, Utah, which are now protected as the Scott M. Matheson Wetlands Preserve. Norma Matheson also advocated for the creation of new national monuments in Utah. In 1996, she joined President Bill Clinton at the declaration ceremony for the creation of Grand Staircase–Escalante National Monument, despite local controversy surrounding the plan. Additionally, Matheson served on the board of directors for the Grand Canyon Trust, which works to preserve the region surrounding the Grand Canyon and the Colorado Plateau.

Matheson also served on a number of other civic, governmental, education and philanthropic boards and committees. These included the Utah Governor's Commission on Aging, Salt Lake League of Women Voters, the Utah Women's Legislative Council, the Alliance for Unity, the USU Botanical Center, the Hogle Zoo, and University of Utah School of Nursing. She also headed the Scott M. Matheson Leadership Forum, named for her husband, where she conducted interviews for Matheson Leadership Scholarship candidates, including for Ben McAdams. McAdams credited the scholarship awarded by Matheson with launching his political career as the Mayor of Salt Lake County and a U.S. Representative, "Receiving it gave me the opportunity to pursue politics and public policy and to endeavor to follow in their very large footsteps."

In 2013, Norma Matheson partnered with former Republican Utah Governor Mike Leavitt and businesswoman Gail Miller to create "Count My Vote", a bipartisan effort to push for state electoral reform. Leavitt, Matheson, Miller, and their organization successfully lobbied for a new law allowing open primary elections in Utah. Matheson, Leavitt, and his wife, former Utah first lady Jackie Leavitt, worked alongside each other on other projects over several decades, including electoral reform, voting rights legislation, and the preservation of the governor's mansion. Leavitt called Matheson "one of Utah's greatest first ladies" and " stalwart Utahn" following her death in 2019.

Matheson remained active until her diagnosis with leukemia. She died from complications of the illness on July 28, 2019, at the age of 89. Matheson was survived by her four children - United States Court of Appeals for the Tenth Circuit judge Scott Matheson Jr., Lu Matheson, former U.S. Jim Matheson, and Tom Matheson; her brother, Jim Warenski; nine grandchildren, and three great-grandchildren. Tributes poured in from across Utah's political spectrum, including from Republican Gary Herbert, who called her "the perfect teammate" for Governor Matheson during both their careers. Norma Matheson was buried next to her husband in Parowan City Cemetery in Parowan, Utah. Her memorial service was held at This Is The Place Heritage Park in Salt Lake City on September 1, 2019.
