= Ewing Matheson =

British civil engineer

Ewing Matheson (1840 – 7 December 1917) was a British civil engineer, consulting engineer, managing director of the Farnley Iron Company, and author, known for his early works on factory management and cost accounting.

== Life and work ==
Matheson was educated as engineer, and started his own practice as independent consulting engineer in London in 1863. Shortly after he joined the Andrew Handyside and Company, an iron founder from Derby, where he was appointed to manage the London and export business of the firm. He worked his way up in the firm and eventually became director of the Andrew Handyside and Company, and a partner in the firm. In 1887 he moved to the Farnley Iron Company, where he was appointed managing director. He was a member of Institution of Civil Engineers since May 1876.

Matheson came into prominence with his 1877 publication Works in Iron: Bridge and Roof Structures. In 1882 he was awarded a Premiums award by the Institution of Civil Engineers for his paper on "Steel for structures"

Matheson was remembered as a "prominent figure in the engineering world", a well-known engineer and the author of several books on civil engineering, a well-known consulting engineer, and "for many years was one of the foremost civil engineers of this country."

== Work ==
=== Works in Iron: Bridge and Roof Structures 1873 ===
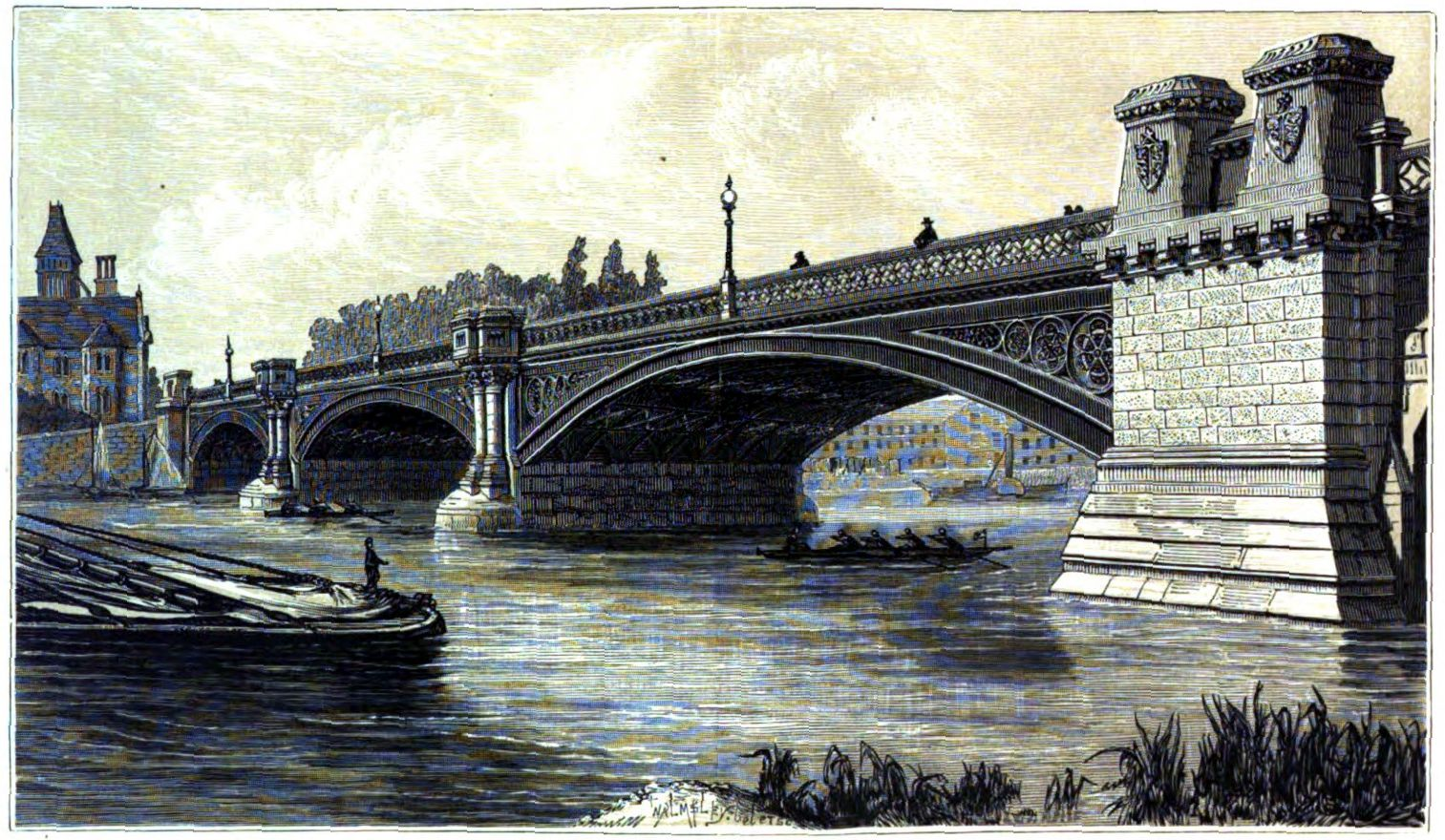
Bridge over the Trent at Nottingham, erected 1869–70.

Matheson's Works in Iron: Bridge and Roof Structures described the engineering practice of iron structures. It focussed on the "practical considerations which affect the choice of design in regard to iron structures. The qualities of material, the classification of different systems, the incidents of transport, and the methods of erection, are stated from a manufacturer's point of view, with a special reference to comparative cost."

The Works in iron was first published in 1869 mainly to promote the products of the Andrew Handyside and Company. The 1873 edition was revised and expanded and presented as entirely new. In 1877 a second edition was published.

=== The depreciation of factories, 1884 ===
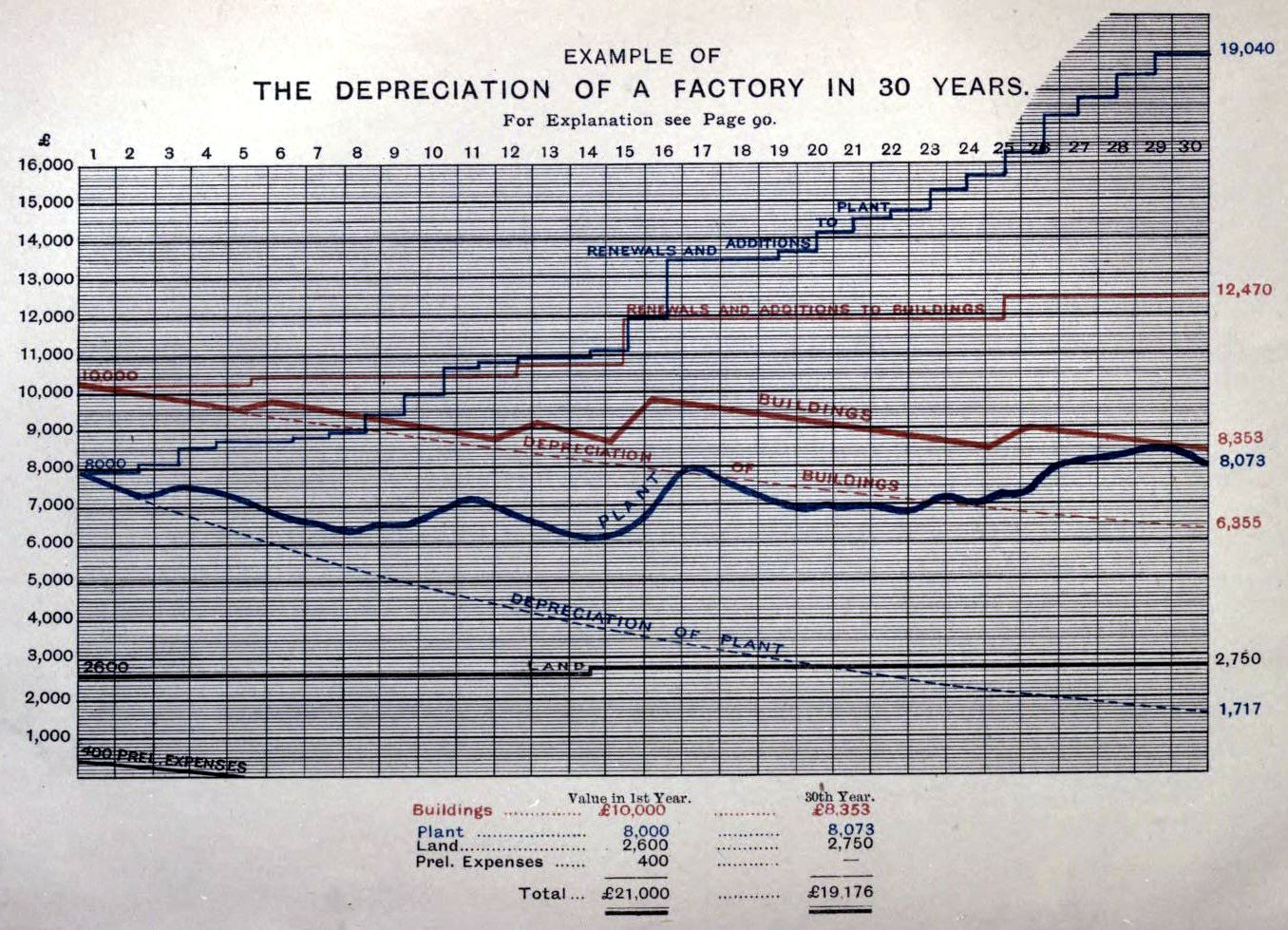
Depreciation of a factory in 30 years, 1884

In 1884 Matheson published his well-known "The depreciation of factories and their valuation." This work was a compilation and extension of a series of articles Matheson had published in The Engineer in 1883. This work is credited for being the first to properly distinguished depreciation, obsolescence and fluctuation in value. According to Hugo Diemer (1904):

This work is of great value in demonstrating the principles involved in the scientific handling of problems of inventorying and appraising. The book contains five chapters on "Depreciation/ and eight chapters on "Valuation " It is written in an easy-flowing, clear style. A general discussion of depreciation, why and how it is used in accounting, is followed by division of the plant into various classes, and a discussion of the depreciation applicable to each class. Some examples follow, and also a very complete table showing the effects of depreciation at different rates for different periods of time a valuable aid in appraisal work. Tables are also given, showing the accumulation of a reserve fund with compound interest in a term of years, and how much must be invested annually as a sinking fund to accumulate a certain amount in a given term of years. In regard to the matter of valuations, a full discussion is given of the many conditions which will affect valuations. The author discusses the valuation of a business as a whole, and of the factory buildings and plant. A new edition has lately been issued.

More specifically J.R. Edwards (2013) explained:

Matheson was one of the first writers to distinguish properly between depreciation (from shortening of the working life of an asset, through physical deterioration), obsolescence (from external causes, such as supersession by improved machines), and fluctuation in value (through changes in market prices). He regarded depreciation much as modern accountants do —- as a measure of consumption of capital, rather than as a revaluation of the asset, and hence as a cost of production, not a voluntary appropriation of profits for replacement. Obsolescence, he thought, should be covered by acceleration of the rate of depreciation. Fluctuation was to be ignored until a revaluation was necessary, for example, on a change of partners.

=== Aid Book to Engineering Enterprise 1878/89/98 ===
In the preface of the third edition Matheson explained, that his work endeavoured "to classify and link together the technical and economic conditions which determine the success or failure of Public Works and Engineering ventures, and in doing this, he enumerates those preliminary particulars on which designs and estimates of cost can alone be framed."

== Selected publications ==
- Matheson, Ewing. Works in iron: bridge and roof structures. E. & FN Spon, 1873; 1877.
- Matheson, Ewing. Aid book to engineering enterprise abroad, 1878; 2nd ed. 1889; 3rd ed. 1898.
- Matheson, Ewing. The depreciation of factories and their valuation. E. & FN Spon, 1884.
- Matheson, Ewing. The depreciation of factories, mines and industrial undertakings and their valuation. E. & FN Spon, Limited, 1903; 1910.
