= Scott M. Matheson =

American politician (1929–1990)

Scott Matheson
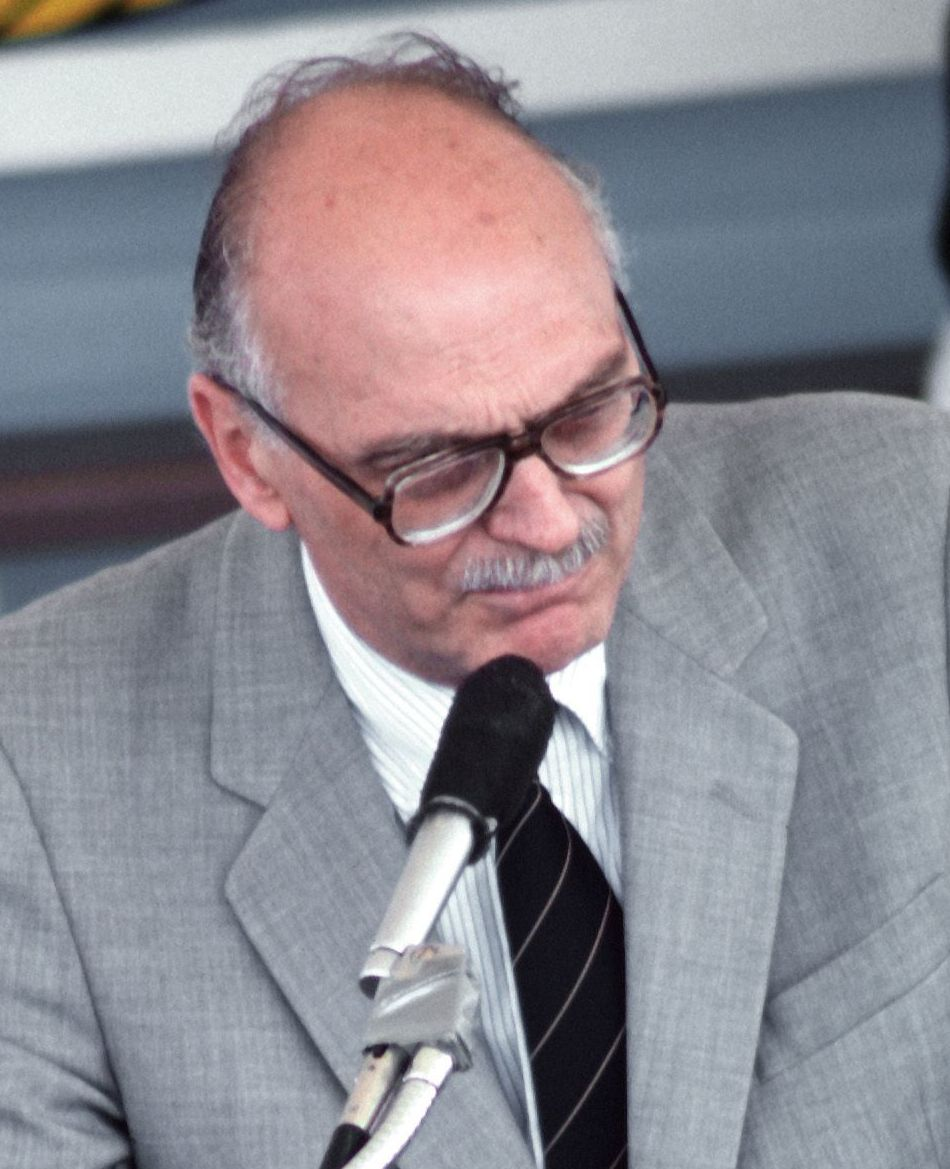
- Matheson in 1984

12th Governor of Utah
- In office January 3, 1977 – January 7, 1985
- Lieutenant: David S. Monson
- Preceded by: Cal Rampton
- Succeeded by: Norm Bangerter

Chair of the National Governors Association
- In office August 10, 1982 – August 2, 1983
- Preceded by: Richard Snelling
- Succeeded by: Jim Thompson

Personal details
- Born: Scott Milne Matheson, Jr. January 8, 1929 Chicago, Illinois, U.S.
- Died: October 7, 1990 (aged 61) Salt Lake City, Utah, U.S.
- Party: Democratic
- Spouse: Norma Warenski (m. 1951)
- Children: 4, including Scott and Jim
- Parent: Scott M. Matheson Sr. (father)
- Education: University of Utah (BA); Stanford University (LLB)

Scott Milne Matheson Jr. (January 8, 1929 – October 7, 1990) was an American politician who served as the 12th governor of Utah from 1977 to 1985. He is the most recent Democrat to serve in that position.

== Biography ==
Matheson was born on January 8, 1929, in Chicago to parents belonging to the Church of Jesus Christ of Latter-day Saints, Scott Milne and Adele Adams Matheson. Soon after his birth, the family moved to Utah, settling first in Parowan before moving to Salt Lake City when his father became United States Attorney for the District of Utah.

Matheson graduated from Salt Lake City's East High School in 1946, earned a bachelor's degree in political science from the University of Utah in 1950, and a law degree from Stanford University Law School in 1952. He operated a private law practice in Iron County, Utah, for five years before taking a position with Union Pacific Railroad in 1958. During his service with the railroad, he rose to the position of general counsel before making his 1976 run for governor.

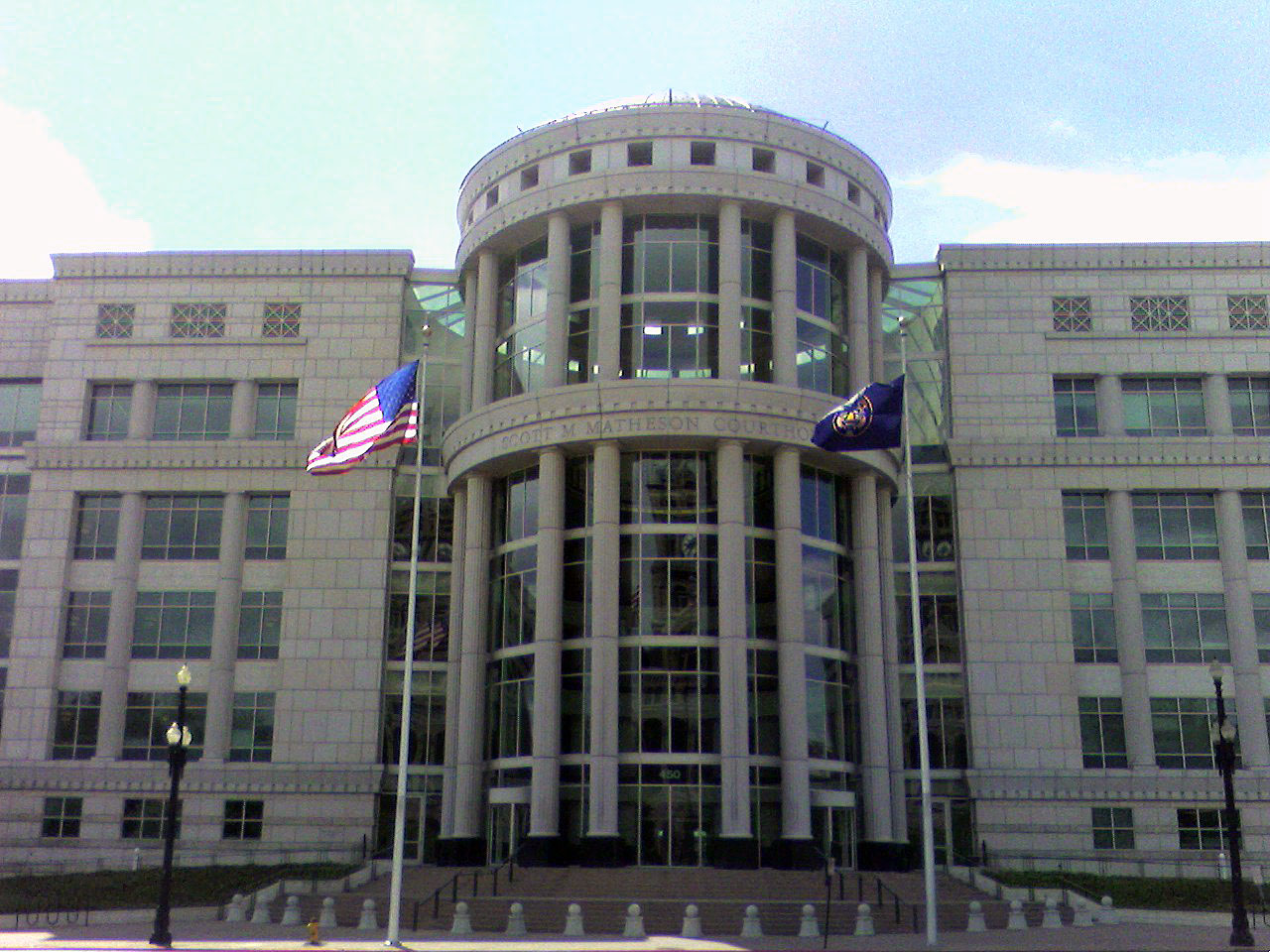
In 1998, the Utah Supreme Court was moved into the Scott M. Matheson Courthouse building.

Matheson defeated Republican nominee Vernon B. Romney by a 52%–46% margin, with two minor candidates combining for the remaining two percent of the vote.

Matheson would be re-elected in 1980 over Republican Bob Wright by a strong 55%–44% margin, even as Republican Presidential candidate Ronald Reagan and Republican U.S. Senator Jake Garn easily carried Utah in their elections held the same day.

During his term as governor, Matheson was named the defendant in the U.S. Supreme Court case of H. L. v. Matheson, which upheld a state law requiring parental consent for a teenage girl to obtain an abortion. He was also chair of the National Governors Association during the 1982–1983 term.

In 1986, Matheson considered a bid for the U.S. Senate to challenge incumbent Orrin Hatch in 1988. Despite leading in hypothetical polling, Matheson announced on May 29, 1987, that he would not run for the seat. Hatch would ultimately be re-elected in a landslide over Democrat Brian H. Moss, who had never held political office.

== Personal life and death ==
On August 25, 1951, he married Norma Louise Warenski, and the couple had four children. One of his sons is former U.S. Congressman Jim Matheson. Another son, Scott Matheson Jr., was the Democratic nominee for Governor of Utah in the 2004 election and was appointed as a federal judge in 2010.

In 1989, Matheson was diagnosed with multiple myeloma, a rare form of cancer believed to have been caused by radioactive fallout from nuclear testing in Nevada. Scott Matheson died from the disease on October 7, 1990, at the age of 61. Matheson's death occurred during the general conference of the LDS Church and was honored by then-apostle Gordon B. Hinckley at the beginning of the Sunday morning session. He is buried in Parowan City Cemetery in Parowan, Utah.

Party political offices
Preceded by Cal Rampton	Democratic nominee for Governor of Utah; 1976, 1980	Succeeded by Wayne Owens
Preceded by John Y. Brown Jr.	Chair of the Democratic Governors Association; 1983	Succeeded by Chuck Robb
Political offices
Preceded by Cal Rampton	Governor of Utah; 1977–1985	Succeeded by Norm Bangerter
Preceded by Richard Snelling	Chair of the National Governors Association; 1982–1983	Succeeded by Jim Thompson
