= Jim Matheson =

American politician (born 1960)

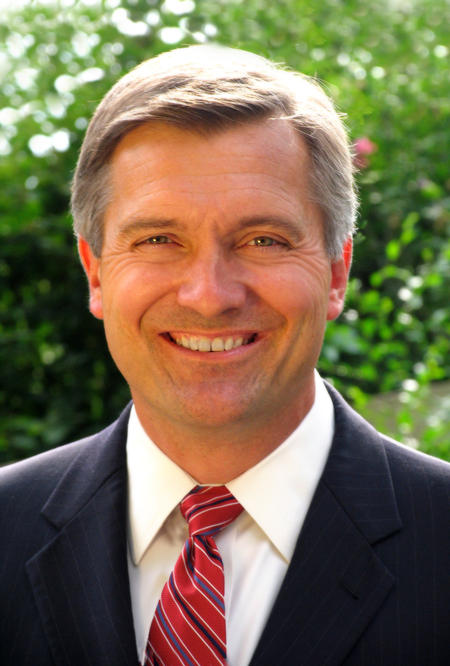
- Official portrait, 2009

Member of the U.S. House of Representatives from Utah
- In office January 3, 2001 – January 3, 2015
- Preceded by: Merrill Cook
- Succeeded by: Mia Love
- Constituency: 2nd district (2001–2013); 4th district (2013–2015)

Personal details
- Born: James David Matheson; March 21, 1960 (age 66) Salt Lake City, Utah, U.S.
- Party: Democratic
- Spouse: Amy
- Children: 2
- Parents: Scott M. Matheson; Norma Warenski
- Relatives: Scott Matheson Jr. (brother)
- Education: Harvard University (BA); University of California, Los Angeles (MBA)

James David Matheson (born March 21, 1960) is an American politician who served as a United States representative from Utah from 2001 to 2015. He represented Utah's 2nd district from 2001 to 2013 and its 4th district from 2013 to 2015 as a member of the Democratic Party. While in office, he was Utah's only congressional Democrat, and his district was one of the most Republican-leaning districts to be represented by a Democrat.

On December 17, 2013, Matheson announced he would not seek reelection in the 2014 elections. There was speculation that Matheson, a moderate Democrat, might run in 2016 for Governor of Utah or for the Utah U.S. Senate seat coming open then, but this did not happen. In 2015, he joined the law firm of Squire Patton Boggs as a lobbyist.

On June 16, 2016, he became the CEO of National Rural Electric Cooperative Association, a trade organization for rural electric cooperatives, succeeding fellow former U.S. representative Jo Ann Emerson.

== Early life, education and career ==
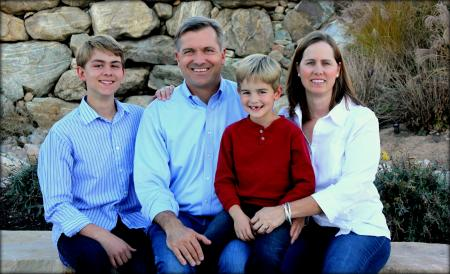
Matheson and his family, November 2012

Matheson was born in Salt Lake City, Utah, and obtained an A.B. from Harvard College and his M.B.A. from the UCLA Anderson School of Management. His father, Scott M. Matheson, served as governor of Utah from 1977 to 1985, his mother, Norma Matheson, was First Lady of Utah and a prominent figure in the state Democratic Party, and his brother, Scott Matheson, Jr., was the 2004 Democratic nominee for Governor. Matheson is a member of the Church of Jesus Christ of Latter-day Saints.

Prior to entering politics, Matheson worked in the energy field, working for several different companies and studying environmental policy. He later started his own energy consulting firm.

His wife, Amy, is a pediatrician and they have two sons, William and Harris.

He joined a group that was in favor of increased compensation for people who were affected by the radiation from Cold War atomic testing. The radioactive fallout from nuclear tests caused the cancer that killed Matheson's father.

== U.S. House of Representatives ==
Matheson was co-chairman of the Blue Dog Coalition, a conservative group of 25 Democrats in the House. He was also a member of the New Democrat Coalition. During his congressional tenure, he was the only Democrat in Utah's Congressional Delegation.

During his time in Congress, Matheson was relatively conservative by national party standards. In the National Journal ratings in 2010, Matheson was more conservative than 51% of his colleagues, but more liberal than 49%, making him one of the most conservative Democrats, yet a centrist overall. On November 3, Matheson voted against requiring public disclosure of bonuses and golden parachute arrangements (agreements between a company and an employee specifying that the employee will receive significant benefits if they are terminated). This was a bill that the Democrats heavily supported and the Republicans opposed; only five other Democrats voted against the bill.

=== Foreign policy and terrorism ===
In March 2007, Matheson was one of 14 Democrats who voted against a bill that would require President George W. Bush to bring combat troops home from Iraq by September 1, 2008. Matheson regularly voted in favor of the wars in the Middle East, having voted for the 2003 Iraq invasion and opposing the bill to remove troops from Libya in 2011 and Pakistan in 2010. He did, however, vote in favor of requiring a time-table for withdrawal from Afghanistan, after opposing the bill in two previous votes.

In 2011, Matheson voted to extend expiring provisions of the PATRIOT Act and voted in favor of the National Defense Authorization Act (NDAA) for Fiscal Year 2012.

=== Abortion ===
Matheson leans anti-abortion but supports expanding federal funding for embryonic stem cell research. He was rated 55% from National Right to Life Committee indicating a mixed record on abortion and 30% from NARAL indicating an anti-abortion voting record. However, Matheson's NARAL Pro-Choice America rating dropped to 0% in 2010, while he garnered a 50% rating from the National Right to Life Committee.

=== Debt and economy ===
Matheson voted against raising the federal debt limit, as well as against both Republican and Democratic budgets that did not reduce the deficit. Matheson, a former energy industry businessman, voted against authorizing the construction of new oil refineries.

Matheson was a strong supporter of Wall Street regulation, voting in favor of the Dodd-Frank Wall Street Reform and Consumer Protection Act, the strongest set of Wall Street reforms since the 1930s. In a comment on this legislation, Matheson stated, "Nearly two years ago the subprime mortgage meltdown triggered the worst financial crisis since the Great Depression. We've been living under the same set of rules that were in place before the financial crisis sparked the job-killing recession. Now, that is about to change."

In July 2011, Matheson was one of five Democrats to vote for the Cut, Cap and Balance Act.

In January 2013, Matheson was one of sixteen Democrats that voted against the American Taxpayer Relief Act of 2012, which was the last minute solution to the U.S. fiscal cliff. Matheson released a statement saying that "to address the fiscal cliff, legislation must include a strong framework for real deficit reduction. Sadly, this bill falls short."

=== Education ===
Matheson is also opposed to the No Child Left Behind Act, believing that education is a local issue and federal funds should come with minimal strings attached. Matheson also believes that the "Highly Qualified Teacher" requirements should be more flexible, and that states should have alternative options to the single standardized test used in No Child Left Behind.

=== Healthcare ===
In November 2009, during intense debates over American health care reform, Matheson voted against the Affordable Health Care for America Act. When President Obama named Matheson's brother Scott M. Matheson to the United States Court of Appeals for the Tenth Circuit at a time where he needed Matheson's vote for the Patient Protection and Affordable Care Act, The Weekly Standard posted an article that said "Barack Obama will host ten House Democrats who voted against the health care bill in November at the White House; he's obviously trying to persuade them to switch their vote to yes. One of the ten is Jim Matheson of Utah." They suggested that the White House was using this timely nomination to influence Matheson's vote. Matheson responded by saying that he is very happy for his brother and that "the federal 10th Circuit Court will gain a judge devoted to judicial integrity, fairness and knowledge of the law." In March 2010, he was one of 34 Democrats to vote against the Patient Protection and Affordable Care Act, which passed the House 219–212. However, when the 112th Congress reconsidered the legislation in January 2011, Matheson voted against repealing the healthcare overhaul.

=== Committee assignments ===
Congressman Matheson sat on these committees and subcommittees in the 111th Congress:

- Committee on Energy and Commerce
  - Subcommittee on Commerce, Manufacturing and Trade
  - Subcommittee on Health

=== Caucus memberships ===
- Congressional Arts Caucus
- Congressional Cement Caucus, Co-chair

== Political campaigns ==
=== 2000 ===
In 2000, Matheson was tapped to run for the 2nd district seat. The Democrats were optimistic in part because the 2nd district has historically been friendlier to Democrats than the rest of Utah and in part because two-term incumbent Merrill Cook had a reputation for erratic behavior. The prospect of losing the seat frightened district Republicans enough that Cook was unseated in the primary by computer executive Derek Smith. However, Matheson defeated Smith comfortably, taking 56% of the vote even as George W. Bush won the district with 57% of the vote.

=== 2002 ===
During the 2000s round of redistricting, the Republican-controlled state legislature made the 2nd significantly more Republican than its predecessor. The old 2nd had been located entirely in Salt Lake County since the 1980s round of redistricting; Salt Lake County has historically been friendlier to Democrats (at least at the state and local level) than the rest of Utah. The legislature drew all or part of 14 mostly rural counties in eastern and southern Utah into the 2nd. They were only connected to Salt Lake City by a narrow band of territory in heavily Republican Utah County. In addition, the legislature shifted most of western Salt Lake City to the 1st, leaving the more conservative eastern part of the city in the 2nd. The new district was approximately six points more Republican than its predecessor.

Ultimately, Matheson defeated State Representative John Swallow by only 1,600 votes, largely due to a 25,800-vote margin over Swallow in Salt Lake County. According to at least one study, some extra financial help from the Republican Party might have helped Swallow defeat Matheson. However, national Republicans stayed out of the race after state legislators claimed they had drawn a district that no Democrat could possibly win.

=== 2004 ===
Matheson defeated Swallow again—this time by a 12-point margin even as Bush won the state by a large margin (and carried the district with 67 percent of the vote).

=== 2006 ===
Matheson defeated State Representative LaVar Christensen by 22 points.

=== 2008 ===
Matheson defeated Republican challenger Bill Dew in the 2008 general election by 28 percent.

=== 2010 ===
Matheson defeated Republican nominee Morgan Philpot. In May, Matheson faced his first challenge from within his party. Claudia Wright claimed that Jim Matheson was not liberal enough and obtained 45% of the vote at the Democratic State Convention, forcing a primary for the Democratic nomination. After weeks of campaigning Matheson secured the Democratic nomination, by obtaining 67.5% of the vote.

=== 2012 ===
Matheson had said he was considering a run for statewide office in 2012, particularly if his seat was substantially changed in redistricting. Polling conducted in July 2011 showed Matheson leading incumbent Republican Senator Orrin Hatch in a possible 2012 Senate race.

On December 15, 2011, Matheson announced that he would run for the newly created seat in the 4th congressional district, meaning there would be an open-seat race for the 2nd district. The 2nd district race was not expected to be competitive for Democrats. In a three-way race between Matheson, Mia Love (Republican) and Jim Vein (Libertarian), Matheson beat Love by 768 votes. In the race, Vein garnered 6,439 votes.

== Electoral history ==
Note: Totals may not equal 100.0 percent due to rounding.

Utah's 2nd congressional district: Results 2000–2010
Year	Democrat	Votes	Pct	Republican	Votes	Pct	3rd Party	Party	Votes	Pct	3rd Party	Party	Votes	Pct	
2000	Jim Matheson	145,021	56%	Derek W. Smith	107,114	41%	Bruce Bangerter	Independent American	4,704	2%	Peter Pixton	Libertarian	2,165	1%	*
2002	Jim Matheson (incumbent)	110,764	49%	John Swallow	109,123	49%	Patrick Diehl	Green	2,589	1%	Ron Copier	Libertarian	1,622	1%	
2004	Jim Matheson (incumbent)	187,250	55%	John Swallow	147,778	43%	Jeremy P. Petersen	Constitution	3,541	1%	Patrick Diehl	Green	2,189	1%	*
2006	Jim Matheson (incumbent)	133,231	59%	LaVar Christensen	84,234	37%	W. David Perry	Constitution	3,395	2%	Bob Brister	Green	3,338	1%	*
2008	Jim Matheson (incumbent)	204,268	63%	Bill Dew	111,696	35%	Dennis Ray Emery	Constitution	2,731	1%	Mathew Arndt	Libertarian	4,171	1%	*
2010	Jim Matheson (incumbent)	116,404	51%	Morgan Philpot	105,514	46%	Randall Hinton	Constitution	4,122	1.79%	David Glissmeyer	Independent	2,143	0.93%	*
Utah's 4th congressional district: Results 2012
2012	Jim Matheson (incumbent)	119,803	49%	Mia Love	119,035	49%	Jim L. Vein	Libertarian	6,439	2.6%					

*Write-in and minor candidate notes: In 2000, Steven Alberts Voris received 597 votes. In 2004, Personal Choice Party candidate Ronald R. Amos received 1,210 votes. In 2006, Libertarian Party candidate Austin Sherwood Lett received 1,620 votes.

== Association leader ==
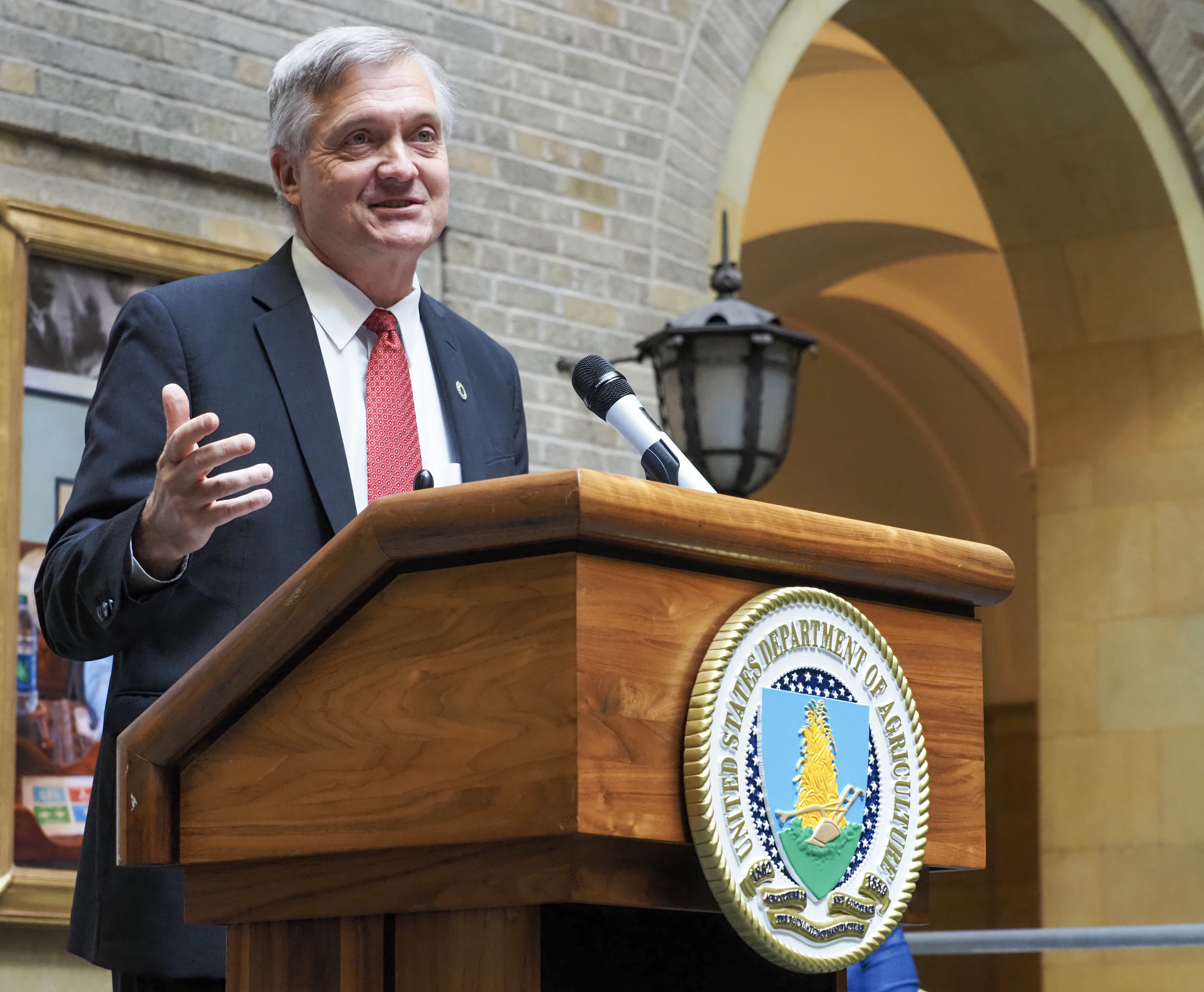
Matheson speaks at a 2026 event at the U.S. Department of Agriculture

Since 2016, Matheson has been chief executive officer of the National Rural Electric Co-op Association, which represents more than 900 electric cooperatives in the United States.

U.S. House of Representatives
Preceded by Merrill Cook	Member of the U.S. House of Representatives from Utah's 2nd congressional district 2001–2013	Succeeded by Chris Stewart
New constituency	Member of the U.S. House of Representatives from Utah's 4th congressional district 2013–2015	Succeeded by Mia Love
Party political offices
Preceded by Jim Turner	Chair of the Blue Dog Coalition for Administration; 2005–2007; Served alongside: Dennis Cardoza (Communications), Jim Cooper (Policy)	Succeeded by Allen Boyd
Preceded by Charlie Melancon	Chair of the Blue Dog Coalition for Communications; 2009–2011; Served alongside: Stephanie Herseth Sandlin (Administration), Baron Hill (Policy)	Succeeded by Mike Ross
U.S. order of precedence (ceremonial)
Preceded by Barbara Cubin as Former U.S. Representative	Order of precedence of the United States as Former U.S. Representative	Succeeded by James R. Jones as Former U.S. Representative
