= 1980 Utah gubernatorial election =

- November 4, 1980
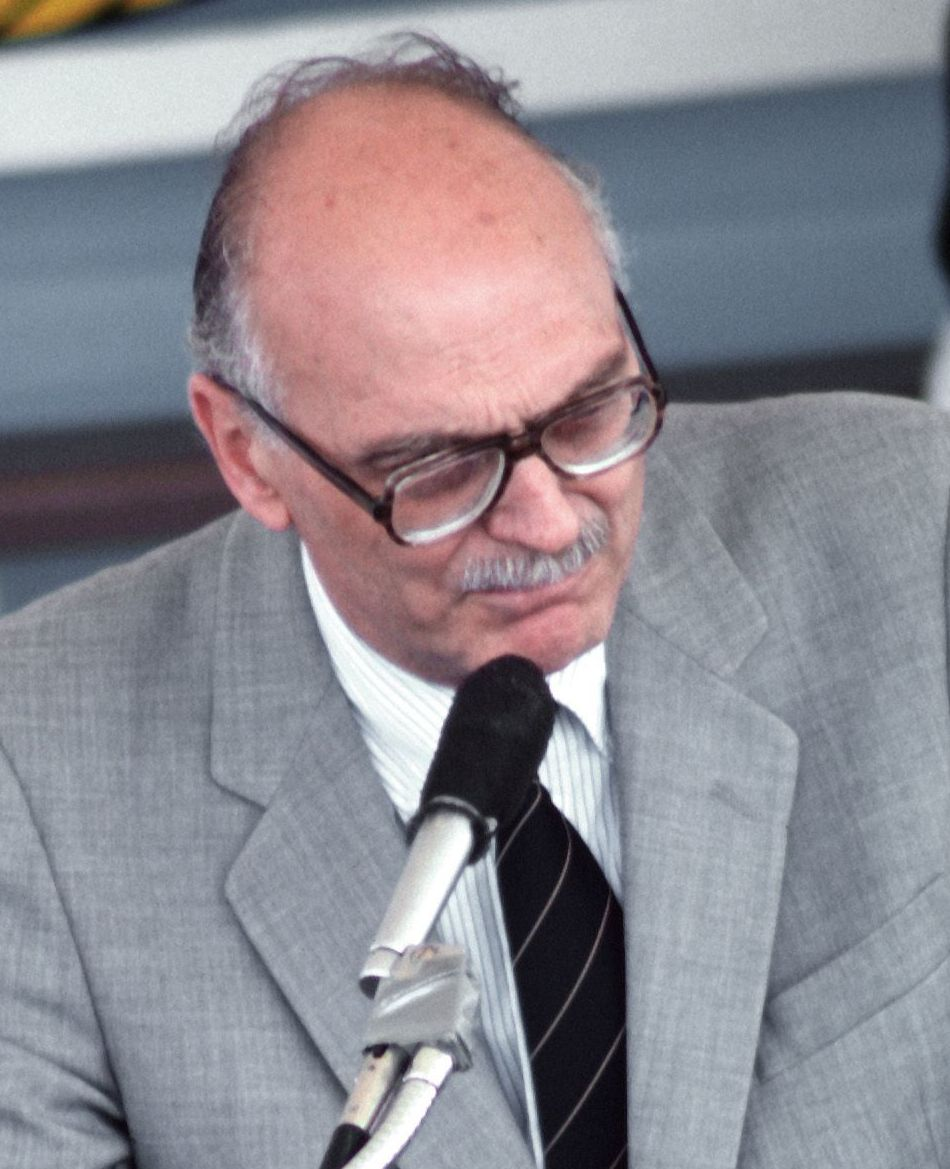

Nominee	Scott M. Matheson	Bob Wright
Party	Democratic	Republican
Popular vote	330,974	266,578
Percentage	55.16%	44.43%
- County results Matheson: 40–50% 50–60% 60–70% 70–80% Wright: 50–60%
Governor before election
Scott M. Matheson
Democratic
Elected Governor
Scott M. Matheson
Democratic

The 1980 Utah gubernatorial election was held on November 4, 1980. Democratic incumbent Scott M. Matheson defeated Republican nominee Bob Wright with 55.16% of the vote. As of 2025, this is the last time a Democrat was elected Governor of Utah; since Matheson left office in 1985, all of Utah's governors have been Republican. In fact, Democrats, save in the "asterisk election" of 1988 featuring a Republican running as an Independent, have not even had a close call during that time; coming no closer in a strict two-candidate race than Matheson's Scott Jr. losing by more than sixteen points in 2004. Matheson's victory was despite Republican presidential candidate Ronald Reagan and incumbent Republican Senator Jake Garn both winning over 72% of the vote in their respective races on the same ballot.

== Primary election ==
Primary elections were held on September 9, 1980.

=== Democratic primary ===
Incumbent governor Scott M. Matheson was renominated without opposition.

=== Republican primary ===
Bob Wright, former Chair of the Utah Republican Party, was nominated without opposition.

== General election ==
=== Candidates ===
- Scott M. Matheson, Democratic
- Bob Wright, Republican
- Lawrence Rey Topham, American Party

=== Results ===
1980 Utah gubernatorial election
Party	Candidate	Votes	%	±%
Democratic	Scott M. Matheson (incumbent)	330,974	55.16%	+3.14%
Republican	Bob Wright	266,578	44.43%	−1.53%
American	Lawrence Rey Topham	2,467	0.41%	−0.92%
Total votes		600,019	100.00%	
Majority		64,396	10.73%	
Democratic hold		Swing	+4.68%	

=== Results by county ===
County	Scott M. Matheson Democratic		Bob Wright Republican		Lawrence Rey Topham American		Margin		Total votes cast
County	#	%	#	%	#	%	#	%	Total votes cast
Beaver	1,464	68.12%	683	31.78%	2	0.09%	781	36.34%	2,149
Box Elder	6,963	46.39%	8,009	53.36%	38	0.25%	-1,046	-6.97%	15,010
Cache	11,192	43.90%	14,202	55.71%	100	0.39%	-3,010	-11.81%	25,494
Carbon	6,867	76.15%	2,143	23.76%	8	0.09%	4,724	52.38%	9,018
Daggett	276	66.99%	136	33.01%	0	0.00%	140	33.98%	412
Davis	28,763	49.96%	28,521	49.54%	292	0.51%	242	0.42%	57,576
Duchesne	2,055	42.21%	2,807	57.66%	6	0.12%	-752	-15.45%	4,868
Emery	2,897	63.70%	1,640	36.06%	11	0.24%	1,257	27.64%	4,548
Garfield	1,173	59.09%	810	40.81%	2	0.10%	363	18.29%	1,985
Grand	1,849	56.61%	1,410	43.17%	7	0.21%	439	13.44%	3,266
Iron	4,795	61.94%	2,926	37.80%	20	0.26%	1,869	24.14%	7,741
Juab	1,627	60.66%	1,049	39.11%	6	0.22%	578	21.55%	2,682
Kane	914	50.64%	886	49.09%	5	0.28%	28	1.55%	1,805
Millard	2,529	56.74%	1,921	43.10%	7	0.16%	608	13.64%	4,457
Morgan	1,195	48.72%	1,255	51.16%	3	0.12%	-60	-2.45%	2,453
Piute	393	54.81%	320	44.63%	4	0.56%	73	10.18%	717
Rich	511	54.89%	418	44.90%	2	0.21%	93	9.99%	931
Salt Lake	149,985	59.70%	99,691	39.68%	1,543	0.61%	50,294	20.02%	251,219
San Juan	1,625	46.32%	1,864	53.14%	19	0.54%	-239	-6.81%	3,508
Sanpete	3,546	53.92%	3,006	45.70%	25	0.38%	540	8.21%	6,577
Sevier	3,654	52.98%	3,209	46.53%	34	0.49%	445	6.45%	6,897
Summit	3,135	62.70%	1,859	37.18%	6	0.12%	1,276	25.52%	5,000
Tooele	5,051	52.10%	4,614	47.60%	29	0.30%	437	4.51%	9,694
Uintah	3,145	43.57%	4,064	56.30%	10	0.14%	-919	-12.73%	7,219
Utah	40,804	47.66%	44,693	52.20%	122	0.14%	-3,889	-4.54%	85,619
Wasatch	2,299	58.38%	1,635	41.52%	4	0.10%	664	16.86%	3,938
Washington	5,465	46.00%	6,365	53.57%	51	0.43%	-900	-7.58%	11,881
Wayne	492	44.97%	599	54.75%	3	0.27%	-107	-9.78%	1,094
Weber	36,310	58.32%	25,843	41.51%	108	0.17%	10,467	16.81%	62,261
Total	330,974	55.16%	266,578	44.43%	2,467	0.41%	64,396	10.73%	600,019

==== Counties that flipped from Republican to Democratic ====
- Davis
- Garfield
- Kane
- Millard
- Piute
- Rich
- Sanpete
- Sevier
- Wasatch
