= Scott Matheson Jr. =

American federal judge (born 1953)

Scott Matheson
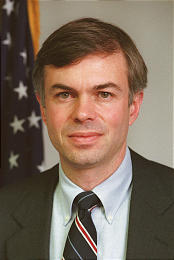
- Official portrait, c. 1993

Judge of the United States Court of Appeals for the Tenth Circuit
- Incumbent
- Assumed office December 27, 2010
- Appointed by: Barack Obama
- Preceded by: Michael W. McConnell

United States Attorney for the District of Utah
- In office 1993–1997
- Appointed by: Bill Clinton
- Preceded by: David J. Jordan
- Succeeded by: Paul Warner

Personal details
- Born: Scott Milne Matheson III; July 15, 1953 (age 73) Salt Lake City, Utah, U.S.
- Party: Democratic
- Parents: Scott M. Matheson; Norma Warenski
- Relatives: Jim Matheson (brother)
- Education: Stanford University (BA); Magdalen College, Oxford (BA); Yale University (JD)

Scott Milne Matheson Jr. (born Scott Milne Matheson III; July 15, 1953) is an American lawyer and jurist serving since 2010 as a U.S. circuit judge of the U.S. Court of Appeals for the Tenth Circuit.

A native of Salt Lake City, Matheson graduated from Stanford University, attended Oxford University as a Rhodes Scholar, and received his Juris Doctor degree from the Yale Law School. After working in private practice for several years, Matheson became a law professor at the University of Utah S.J. Quinney College of Law, where he served as dean from 1998 to 2006. Matheson was the United States attorney for the District of Utah from 1993 to 1997.

== Early life and education ==
Matheson was born and raised in Salt Lake City, Utah. His father, Scott M. Matheson, served as Governor of Utah from 1977 to 1985, his mother, Norma Matheson, served as First Lady of Utah, and his brother, Jim Matheson, served as a United States representative from Utah from 2001 to 2015.

Matheson earned a Bachelors of Arts degree with distinction from Stanford University in 1975, where he won the Anna Laura Myers Prize for an outstanding undergraduate economics thesis. He then went to Magdalen College, Oxford, as a Rhodes Scholar, receiving a BA (promoted to a Master of Arts per tradition) in modern history in 1977. He then attended the Yale Law School, where he was a notes editor for the Yale Law Journal and graduated with a Juris Doctor in 1980.

== Professional career ==
After graduating from law school, Matheson first worked as his father's campaign manager for the 1980 Utah gubernatorial election. In 1981, he entered private practice as an associate at the Washington, D.C. litigation firm Williams & Connolly.

In 1985, Matheson joined the faculty of the S.J. Quinney College of Law at the University of Utah. There, Matheson primarily taught constitutional law, criminal law, and civil procedure. Matheson was also extensively involved in law administration and law reform efforts, serving as a vice-chair of the Utah Constitutional Revision Committee, a chair of the Utah Supreme Court Advisory Committee on the Rules of Evidence, and a member of the Utah State Bar Commission. Matheson was also involved in efforts to expand legal aid in Utah, establishing a pro bono Initiative at the S.J. Quinney College of Law and serving on the Board of Trustees of the Legal Aid Society of Salt Lake.

During his time as a law professor, Matheson contributed to various other institutions during leaves of absence. From 1988 to 1989, Matheson served as the Deputy County Attorney for Salt Lake County. From 1989 to 1990, Matheson was a visiting professor in the Frank Stanton Chair on the First Amendment at Harvard University's John F. Kennedy School of Government. From 1993 to 1997, Matheson was the United States attorney for the District of Utah.

Matheson served as dean of the S.J. Quinney School of Law from 1998 to 2006. After concluding his deanship, Matheson spent his one-year sabbatical as a Public Policy Scholar at the Woodrow Wilson International Center for Scholars in Washington, DC.

From 2007 to 2008, Matheson chaired the Utah Mine Safety Commission, which was formed in response to the Crandall Canyon Mine disaster and charged with improving mine safety and disaster response in the state.

Matheson was also the unsuccessful Democratic candidate for Governor of Utah in 2004, losing to Republican former U.S. Deputy Trade Representative Jon Huntsman Jr. with 41.4% of the vote.

Matheson is the author of the book Presidential Constitutionalism in Perilous Times (2009) and numerous law review articles.

=== Federal judicial service ===
On March 3, 2010, President Barack Obama nominated Matheson to the United States Court of Appeals for the Tenth Circuit to replace Judge Michael W. McConnell, who resigned in August 2009. Matheson's nomination was unanimously approved by the Senate Judiciary Committee.

However, sources such as the Fox News Channel and conservative magazine The Weekly Standard alleged that Obama hoped to influence Matheson's brother, Rep. Jim Matheson, to vote for the Patient Protection and Affordable Care Act. According to The Salt Lake Tribune, "Rep. Jim Matheson called the claim simply absurd, as did the White House, Senator Orrin Hatch and pretty much everyone who knows the Mathesons."

Hatch, an establishment conservative Republican from Utah, supported Matheson and helped shepherd the nomination through the Senate. On December 22, 2010, the U.S. Senate confirmed the nomination. Matheson received his judicial commission on December 27, 2010.

Party political offices
Preceded by Bill Orton	Democratic nominee for Governor of Utah; 2004	Succeeded by Bob Springmeyer
Legal offices
Preceded by Michael W. McConnell	Judge of the United States Court of Appeals for the Tenth Circuit; 2010–present	Incumbent
