= Utah's 1st congressional district =

U.S. House district for Utah

Coordinates: 41.0°N 111.5°W

- Interactive map of district boundaries
- Representative: Blake Moore; R–Salt Lake City
- Population (2025): 883,519
- Median household income: $94,832
- Ethnicity: 78.7% White; 13.2% Hispanic; 3.6% Two or more races; 2.1% Asian; 1.3% other; 1.1% Black
- Cook PVI: D+12

Utah's 1st congressional district serves the northern area of Utah, including the cities of Ogden, Logan, Layton, Clearfield, parts of Park City and Salt Lake City, and the northern half of the Great Salt Lake.

The current member of the United States House of Representatives from the district is Republican Blake Moore.

President George W. Bush received 73% of the vote in this district in 2004. Scoring a Cook Partisan Voting Index (CPVI) of R+26 in 2004, the 1st Congressional District narrowly beat three other Congressional Districts which scored R+25 to become the most Republican district in the nation.

Since 1983, the 1st had been located in northern Utah. However, in 2026, as a result of court-ordered mid-decade redistricting, the 1st was reconstituted as a significantly more compact district entirely within Salt Lake County, including almost all of Salt Lake City. This district is seen as safely Democratic. Meanwhile, the old 1st essentially became the 2nd district. Ben McAdams, who represented the 4th district from 2019 to 2021, became the first member from the new 1st, while Moore was reelected from the new 2nd.

== Recent election results from statewide races ==
=== 2023–2027 boundaries ===
Year	Office	Results
2008	President	McCain 62% - 35%
2012	President	Romney 74% - 26%
2016	President	Trump 44% - 29%
2016	Senate	Lee 67% - 28%
2016	Governor	Herbert 65% - 30%
2016	Attorney General	Reyes 64% - 26%
2016	Treasurer	Damschen 60% - 34%
2016	Auditor	Dougall 62% - 32%
2018	Senate	Romney 61% - 32%
2020	President	Trump 58% - 38%
2020	Governor	Cox 62% - 31%
2020	Attorney General	Reyes 60% - 34%
2022	Senate	Lee 51% - 44%
2024	President	Trump 58% - 38%
2024	Senate	Curtis 61% - 33%
2024	Governor	Cox 54% - 29%
2024	Attorney General	Brown 57% - 28%
2024	Treasurer	Oaks 63% - 30%
2024	Auditor	Cannon 62% - 32%

=== 2027–2033 boundaries ===
Year	Office	Results
2008	President	Obama 54% - 43%
2012	President	Romney 54% - 46%
2016	President	Clinton 49% - 28%
2016	Senate	Snow 48% - 47%
2016	Governor	Weinholtz 50% - 46%
2016	Attorney General	Reyes 46% - 43%
2016	Treasurer	Hansen 52% - 41%
2016	Auditor	Mitchell 51% - 43%
2018	Senate	Wilson 52% - 43%
2020	President	Biden 60% - 36%
2020	Governor	Peterson 52% - 43%
2020	Attorney General	Skordas 56% - 38%
2022	Senate	McMullin 63% - 32%
2024	President	Harris 60% - 37%
2024	Senate	Gleich 55% - 41%
2024	Governor	King 51% - 39%
2024	Attorney General	Bautista 48% - 37%
2024	Treasurer	Hansen 52% - 43%
2024	Auditor	Voutaz 54% - 42%

== List of members representing the district ==
Until 1913, the district was the only district, elected statewide At-large.

District borders are periodically redrawn and some district residences may no longer be in this district.

Member	Party	Years	Cong ress	Electoral history	Location
District established March 4, 1913
Joseph Howell (Logan)	Republican	March 4, 1913 – March 3, 1917	63rd 64th	Redistricted from the at-large district and re-elected in 1912. Re-elected in 1914. Retired.	
Milton H. Welling (Fielding)	Democratic	March 4, 1917 – March 3, 1921	65th 66th	Elected in 1916. Re-elected in 1918. Retired to run for U.S. Senator.	
Don B. Colton (Vernal)	Republican	March 4, 1921 – March 3, 1933	67th 68th 69th 70th 71st 72nd	Elected in 1920. Re-elected in 1922. Re-elected in 1924. Re-elected in 1926. Re-elected in 1928. Re-elected in 1930. Lost re-election.	
Abe Murdock (Beaver)	Democratic	March 4, 1933 – January 3, 1941	73rd 74th 75th 76th	Elected in 1932. Re-elected in 1934. Re-elected in 1936. Re-elected in 1938. Retired to run for U.S. Senator.	
Walter K. Granger (Cedar City)	Democratic	January 3, 1941 – January 3, 1953	77th 78th 79th 80th 81st 82nd	Elected in 1940. Re-elected in 1942. Re-elected in 1944. Re-elected in 1946. Re-elected in 1948. Re-elected in 1950. Retired to run for U.S. Senator.	
Douglas R. Stringfellow (Ogden)	Republican	January 3, 1953 – January 3, 1955	83rd	Elected in 1952. Renominated, but replaced on ballot due to personal scandal.	
Henry Aldous Dixon (Ogden)	Republican	January 3, 1955 – January 3, 1961	84th 85th 86th	Elected in 1954. Re-elected in 1956. Re-elected in 1958. Retired.	
M. Blaine Peterson (Ogden)	Democratic	January 3, 1961 – January 3, 1963	87th	Elected in 1960. Lost re-election.	
Laurence J. Burton (Ogden)	Republican	January 3, 1963 – January 3, 1971	88th 89th 90th 91st	Elected in 1962. Re-elected in 1964. Re-elected in 1966. Re-elected in 1968. Retired to run for U.S. Senator.	
K. Gunn McKay (Huntsville)	Democratic	January 3, 1971 – January 3, 1981	92nd 93rd 94th 95th 96th	Elected in 1970. Re-elected in 1972. Re-elected in 1974. Re-elected in 1976. Re-elected in 1978. Lost re-election.	
Jim Hansen (Farmington)	Republican	January 3, 1981 – January 3, 2003	97th 98th 99th 100th 101st 102nd 103rd 104th 105th 106th 107th	Elected in 1980. Re-elected in 1982. Re-elected in 1984. Re-elected in 1986. Re-elected in 1988. Re-elected in 1990. Re-elected in 1992. Re-elected in 1994. Re-elected in 1996. Re-elected in 1998. Re-elected in 2000. Retired.	
Rob Bishop (Brigham City)	Republican	January 3, 2003 – January 3, 2021	108th 109th 110th 111th 112th 113th 114th 115th 116th	Elected in 2002. Re-elected in 2004. Re-elected in 2006. Re-elected in 2008. Re-elected in 2010. Re-elected in 2012. Re-elected in 2014. Re-elected in 2016. Re-elected in 2018. Retired to join Thomas Wright's gubernatorial ticket.	2003–2013:
Rob Bishop (Brigham City)	Republican	January 3, 2003 – January 3, 2021	108th 109th 110th 111th 112th 113th 114th 115th 116th	Elected in 2002. Re-elected in 2004. Re-elected in 2006. Re-elected in 2008. Re-elected in 2010. Re-elected in 2012. Re-elected in 2014. Re-elected in 2016. Re-elected in 2018. Retired to join Thomas Wright's gubernatorial ticket.	2013–2023:
Blake Moore (Salt Lake City)	Republican	January 3, 2021 – present	117th 118th 119th	Elected in 2020. Re-elected in 2022. Re-elected in 2024. Redistricted to the 2nd district.	2013–2023:
Blake Moore (Salt Lake City)	Republican	January 3, 2021 – present	117th 118th 119th	Elected in 2020. Re-elected in 2022. Re-elected in 2024. Redistricted to the 2nd district.	2023–2027:
Ben McAdams (Salt Lake City)	Democratic	Assuming office on January 3, 2027		Elected in 2026.	2027–present:

== Election results ==
=== 1912 ===
Note: The 1912 election consisted of an all-party election for the two at-large seats. Howell was elected to the first at-large seat, while Johnson was elected to the second at-large seat.

1912 United States House of Representatives elections
Party	Candidate	Votes	%
Republican	Joseph Howell	43,133	19.45
Republican	Jacob Johnson	42,047	18.96
Democratic	Mathonihah Thomas	37,192	16.77
Democratic	Tollman D. Johnson	36,640	16.52
Progressive	S.H. Love	22,358	10.08
Progressive	Lewis Larson	21,934	9.89
Socialist	Murray E. King	8,971	4.05
Socialist	William M. Knerr	8,953	4.04
Socialist Labor	Elias Anderson	505	0.23
Total votes		221,733	100.0
Republican win (new seat)			

=== 1914 ===
1914 United States House of Representatives elections
Party	Candidate	Votes	%
Republican	Joseph Howell (Incumbent)	29,481	49.36
Democratic	Lewis Larson	27,440	45.94
Socialist	Ben Jansen	2,812	4.70
Total votes		59,733	100.0
Republican hold			

=== 1916 ===
1916 United States House of Representatives elections
Party	Candidate	Votes	%
Democratic	Milton H. Welling	40,035	55.55
Republican	Timothy C. Hoyt	29,902	41.49
Socialist	Daniel Konald	2,134	2.96
Total votes		72,071	100.0
Democratic gain from Republican			

=== 1918 ===
1918 United States House of Representatives elections
Party	Candidate	Votes	%
Democratic	Milton H. Welling (Incumbent)	25,327	54.64
Republican	William H. Wattis	20,478	44.18
Socialist	Daniel N. Keef	548	1.18
Total votes		46,353	100.0
Democratic hold			

=== 1920 ===
1920 United States House of Representatives elections
Party	Candidate	Votes	%
Republican	Don B. Colton	42,249	57.49
Democratic	James W. Funk	28,160	38.32
Farmer–Labor	John O. Watters	3,083	4.19
Total votes		73,492	100.0
Republican gain from Democratic			

=== 1922 ===
1922 United States House of Representatives elections
Party	Candidate	Votes	%
Republican	Don B. Colton (Incumbent)	33,188	52.73
Democratic	Milton H. Welling	27,801	44.17
Farmer–Labor	John O. Watters	1,949	3.10
Total votes		62,938	100.0
Republican hold			

=== 1924 ===
1924 United States House of Representatives elections
Party	Candidate	Votes	%
Republican	Don B. Colton (Incumbent)	40,883	54.86
Democratic	Frank Francis	33,644	45.14
Total votes		74,527	100.0
Republican hold			

=== 1926 ===
1926 United States House of Representatives elections
Party	Candidate	Votes	%
Republican	Don B. Colton (Incumbent)	44,007	61.44
Democratic	Ephraim Bergeson	27,198	37.97
Socialist	John O. Watters	426	0.59
Total votes		71,631	100.0
Republican hold			

=== 1928 ===
1928 United States House of Representatives elections
Party	Candidate	Votes	%
Republican	Don B. Colton (Incumbent)	50,274	60.89
Democratic	Knox Patterson	31,889	38.62
Socialist	John O. Watters	408	0.49
Total votes		82,571	100.0
Republican hold			

=== 1930 ===
1930 United States House of Representatives elections
Party	Candidate	Votes	%
Republican	Don B. Colton (Incumbent)	45,875	60.77
Democratic	Joseph Ririe	29,210	38.70
Socialist	A. W. Clemons	402	0.53
Total votes		75,487	100.0
Republican hold			

=== 1932 ===
1932 United States House of Representatives elections
Party	Candidate	Votes	%
Democratic	Abe Murdock	47,774	51.59
Republican	Don B. Colton (Incumbent)	44,827	48.41
Total votes		92,601	100.0
Democratic gain from Republican			

=== 1934 ===
1934 United States House of Representatives elections
Party	Candidate	Votes	%
Democratic	Abe Murdock (Incumbent)	55,800	64.43
Republican	Arthur Woolley	29,878	34.51
Socialist	William J. McConnell	644	0.74
Communist	Lawrence Mower	279	0.32
Total votes		86,601	100.0
Democratic hold			

=== 1936 ===
1936 United States House of Representatives elections
Party	Candidate	Votes	%
Democratic	Abe Murdock (Incumbent)	68,877	69.23
Republican	Charles W. Dunn	30,415	30.57
Socialist	William J. McConnell	202	0.20
Total votes		99,494	100.0
Democratic hold			

=== 1938 ===
1938 United States House of Representatives elections
Party	Candidate	Votes	%
Democratic	Abe Murdock (Incumbent)	52,927	59.66
Republican	LeRoy B. Young	35,790	40.34
Total votes		88,717	100.0
Democratic hold			

=== 1940 ===
1940 United States House of Representatives elections
Party	Candidate	Votes	%
Democratic	Walter K. Granger	62,654	57.13
Republican	LeRoy B. Young	47,021	42.87
Total votes		109,675	100.0
Democratic hold			

=== 1942 ===
1942 United States House of Representatives elections
Party	Candidate	Votes	%
Democratic	Walter K. Granger (Incumbent)	36,297	50.19
Republican	J. Bracken Lee	36,028	49.81
Total votes		72,325	100.0
Democratic hold			

=== 1944 ===
1944 United States House of Representatives elections
Party	Candidate	Votes	%
Democratic	Walter K. Granger (Incumbent)	59,755	57.79
Republican	B. H. Stringham	43,642	42.21
Total votes		103,397	100.0
Democratic hold			

=== 1946 ===
1946 United States House of Representatives elections
Party	Candidate	Votes	%
Democratic	Walter K. Granger (Incumbent)	44,888	50.06
Republican	David J. Wilson	44,784	49.94
Total votes		89,672	100.0
Democratic hold			

=== 1948 ===
1948 United States House of Representatives elections
Party	Candidate	Votes	%
Democratic	Walter K. Granger (Incumbent)	66,641	59.04
Republican	David J. Wilson	46,229	40.96
Total votes		112,870	100.0
Democratic hold			

=== 1950 ===
1950 United States House of Representatives elections
Party	Candidate	Votes	%
Democratic	Walter K. Granger (Incumbent)	54,161	51.08
Republican	Preston L. Jones	51,868	48.92
Total votes		106,029	100.0
Democratic hold			

=== 1952 ===
1952 United States House of Representatives elections
Party	Candidate	Votes	%
Republican	Douglas R. Stringfellow	76,545	60.54
Democratic	Ernest R. McKay	49,898	39.46
Total votes		126,443	100.0
Republican gain from Democratic			

=== 1954 ===
1954 United States House of Representatives elections
Party	Candidate	Votes	%
Republican	Henry Aldous Dixon	55,542	53.37
Democratic	Walter K. Granger	48,535	46.63
Total votes		104,077	100.0
Republican hold			

=== 1956 ===
1956 United States House of Representatives elections
Party	Candidate	Votes	%
Republican	Henry Aldous Dixon (Incumbent)	74,107	60.92
Democratic	Carlyle F. Gronning	47,533	39.08
Total votes		121,640	100.0
Republican hold			

=== 1958 ===
1958 United States House of Representatives elections
Party	Candidate	Votes	%
Republican	Henry Aldous Dixon (Incumbent)	58,141	53.90
Democratic	M. Blaine Peterson	49,735	46.10
Total votes		107,876	100.0
Republican hold			

=== 1960 ===
1960 United States House of Representatives elections
Party	Candidate	Votes	%
Democratic	M. Blaine Peterson	65,939	50.03
Republican	A. Walter Stevenson	65,871	49.97
Total votes		131,810	100.0
Democratic gain from Republican			

=== 1962 ===
1962 United States House of Representatives elections
Party	Candidate	Votes	%
Republican	Laurence J. Burton	59,032	50.88
Democratic	M. Blaine Peterson (Incumbent)	56,989	49.12
Total votes		116,021	100.0
Republican gain from Democratic			

=== 1964 ===
1964 United States House of Representatives elections
Party	Candidate	Votes	%
Republican	Laurence J. Burton (Incumbent)	75,986	55.97
Democratic	William G. Bruhn	59,768	44.03
Total votes		135,754	100.0
Republican hold			

=== 1966 ===
1966 United States House of Representatives elections
Party	Candidate	Votes	%
Republican	Laurence J. Burton (Incumbent)	99,750	66.50
Democratic	J. Keith Melville	50,260	33.50
Total votes		150,010	100.0
Republican hold			

=== 1968 ===
1968 United States House of Representatives elections
Party	Candidate	Votes	%
Republican	Laurence J. Burton (Incumbent)	139,456	68.12
Democratic	Richard J. Maughan	65,265	31.88
Total votes		204,721	100.0
Republican hold			

=== 1970 ===
1970 United States House of Representatives elections
Party	Candidate	Votes	%
Democratic	K. Gunn McKay	95,499	51.27
Republican	Richard Richards	89,269	47.93
American Independent	Daniel L. Worthington	1,489	0.80
Total votes		186,257	100.0
Democratic gain from Republican			

=== 1972 ===
1972 United States House of Representatives elections
Party	Candidate	Votes	%
Democratic	K. Gunn McKay (Incumbent)	127,027	55.40
Republican	Robert K. Wolthuis	96,296	42.00
American	L. S. Brown	5,978	2.60
Total votes		229,301	100.0
Democratic hold			

=== 1974 ===
1974 United States House of Representatives elections
Party	Candidate	Votes	%
Democratic	K. Gunn McKay (Incumbent)	124,793	62.63
Republican	Ronald W. Inkley	62,807	31.52
American	L. S. Brown	11,664	5.85
Total votes		199,264	100.0
Democratic hold			

=== 1976 ===
1976 United States House of Representatives elections
Party	Candidate	Votes	%
Democratic	K. Gunn McKay (Incumbent)	155,631	58.17
Republican	Joe H. Ferguson	106,542	39.83
American	Harry B. Gerlach	5,358	2.00
Total votes		267,531	100.0
Democratic hold			

=== 1978 ===
1978 United States House of Representatives elections
Party	Candidate	Votes	%
Democratic	K. Gunn McKay (Incumbent)	93,892	51.03
Republican	Jed J. Richardson	85,028	46.21
American Independent	Robert Terrance Owens	4,180	2.27
Independent	Dennis A. De Boer	894	0.49
Total votes		183,994	100.0
Democratic hold			

=== 1980 ===
1980 United States House of Representatives elections
Party	Candidate	Votes	%
Republican	James V. Hansen	157,111	52.10
Democratic	K. Gunn McKay (Incumbent)	144,459	47.90
Total votes		301,570	100.0
Republican gain from Democratic			

=== 1982 ===
1982 United States House of Representatives elections
Party	Candidate	Votes	%
Republican	James V. Hansen (Incumbent)	111,416	62.80
Democratic	A. Stephen Dirks	66,006	37.20
Total votes		177,422	100.0
Republican hold			

=== 1984 ===
1984 United States House of Representatives elections
Party	Candidate	Votes	%
Republican	James V. Hansen (Incumbent)	142,952	71.22
Democratic	Milton C. Abrams	56,619	28.21
Libertarian	Willy Marshall	1,146	0.57
Total votes		200,717	100.0
Republican hold			

=== 1986 ===
1986 United States House of Representatives elections
Party	Candidate	Votes	%
Republican	James V. Hansen (Incumbent)	82,151	51.56
Democratic	K. Gunn McKay	77,180	48.44
Total votes		159,331	100.0
Republican hold			

=== 1988 ===
1988 United States House of Representatives elections
Party	Candidate	Votes	%
Republican	James V. Hansen (Incumbent)	130,893	59.80
Democratic	K. Gunn McKay	87,976	40.20
Total votes		218,869	100.0
Republican hold			

=== 1990 ===
1990 United States House of Representatives elections
Party	Candidate	Votes	%
Republican	James V. Hansen (Incumbent)	82,746	52.15
Democratic	Kenley Brunsdale	69,491	43.80
American	Reva Marx Wadsworth	6,429	4.05
Total votes		158,666	100.0
Republican hold			

=== 1992 ===
1992 United States House of Representatives elections
Party	Candidate	Votes	%
Republican	James V. Hansen (Incumbent)	160,037	65.25
Democratic	Ron Holt	68,712	28.02
Independent	William J. "Dub" Lawrence	16,505	6.73
Total votes		245,254	100.0
Republican hold			

=== 1994 ===
1994 United States House of Representatives elections
Party	Candidate	Votes	%
Republican	James V. Hansen (Incumbent)	104,954	64.54
Democratic	Bobbie Coray	57,664	35.46
Total votes		162,618	100.0
Republican hold			

=== 1996 ===
1996 United States House of Representatives elections
Party	Candidate	Votes	%
Republican	James V. Hansen (Incumbent)	150,126	68.31
Democratic	Gregory J. Sanders	65,866	29.97
Natural Law	Randall Tolpinrud	3,787	1.72
Total votes		219,779	100.0
Republican hold			

=== 1998 ===
1998 United States House of Representatives elections
Party	Candidate	Votes	%
Republican	James V. Hansen (Incumbent)	109,708	67.69
Democratic	Steve Beierlein	49,307	30.42
Libertarian	Gerald A. Arthus	3,070	1.89
Total votes		162,085	100.0
Republican hold			

=== 2000 ===
2000 United States House of Representatives elections
Party	Candidate	Votes	%
Republican	James V. Hansen (Incumbent)	180,591	68.98
Democratic	Kathleen McConkie Collinwood	71,229	27.21
Independent American	Hartley D. Anderson	5,131	1.96
Libertarian	Dave Starr Seely	3,151	1.20
Natural Law	Matthew D. Frandsen	1,703	0.65
Total votes		261,805	100.0
Republican hold			

=== 2002 ===
2002 United States House of Representatives elections
Party	Candidate	Votes	%
Republican	Rob Bishop	109,265	60.90
Democratic	Dave Thomas	66,104	36.84
Green	Craig Axford	4,027	2.24
Write-ins		16	0.01
Total votes		179,412	100.0
Republican hold			

=== 2004 ===
2004 United States House of Representatives elections
Party	Candidate	Votes	%
Republican	Rob Bishop (Incumbent)	199,615	67.91
Democratic	Steven Thompson	85,630	29.13
Constitution	Charles Johnston	4,510	1.53
Personal Choice	Richard W. Soderberg	4,206	1.43
Total votes		293,961	100.0
Republican hold			

=== 2006 ===
2006 United States House of Representatives elections
Party	Candidate	Votes	%
Republican	Rob Bishop (Incumbent)	112,546	63.06
Democratic	Steven Olsen	57,922	32.45
Constitution	Mark Hudson	5,539	3.10
Libertarian	Lynn Badler	2,467	1.38
Total votes		178,474	100.0
Republican hold			

=== 2008 ===
2008 United States House of Representatives elections
Party	Candidate	Votes	%
Republican	Rob Bishop (Incumbent)	196,799	64.85
Democratic	Morgan E. Bowen	92,469	30.47
Constitution	Kirk D. Pearson	7,397	2.44
Libertarian	Joseph Geddes Buchman	6,780	2.23
Total votes		303,445	100.0
Republican hold			

=== 2010 ===
2010 United States House of Representatives elections
Party	Candidate	Votes	%
Republican	Rob Bishop (Incumbent)	135,247	69.19
Democratic	Morgan E. Bowen	46,765	23.93
Constitution	Kirk D. Pearson	9,143	4.68
Libertarian	Jared Paul Stratton	4,307	2.20
Total votes		195,462	100.0
Republican hold			

=== 2012 ===
2012 United States House of Representatives elections
Party	Candidate	Votes	%
Republican	Rob Bishop (Incumbent)	161,546	71.50
Democratic	Donna McAleer	55,740	24.70
Constitution	Sherry Phipps	8,603	3.80
Total votes		225,889	100.0
Republican hold			

=== 2014 ===
2014 United States House of Representatives elections
Party	Candidate	Votes	%
Republican	Rob Bishop (Incumbent)	84,231	64.78
Democratic	Donna McAleer	36,422	28.01
Libertarian	Craig Bowden	4,847	3.73
Independent American	Dwayne A Vance	4,534	3.49
Total votes		130,034	100.0
Republican hold			

=== 2016 ===
2016 United States House of Representatives elections
Party	Candidate	Votes	%
Republican	Rob Bishop (Incumbent)	182,928	65.9
Democratic	Peter C. Clemens	73,381	26.4
Libertarian	Craig Bowden	16,296	5.9
Unaffiliated	Chadwick H. Fairbanks III	4,850	1.7
Total votes		277,455	100.0
Republican hold			

=== 2018 ===
2018 United States House of Representatives elections
Party	Candidate	Votes	%
Republican	Rob Bishop (Incumbent)	156,692	61.6
Democratic	Lee Castillo	63,308	24.9
United Utah	Eric Eliason	29,547	11.6
Green	Adam Davis	4,786	1.9
Total votes		254,333	100.0
Republican hold			

=== 2020 ===
2020 United States House of Representatives elections
Party	Candidate	Votes	%
Republican	Blake Moore	237,988	69.52
Democratic	Darren Parry	104,194	30.43
Write-in		169	0.05
Total votes		342,351	100.00
Republican hold			

=== 2022 ===
2022 United States House of Representatives elections
Party	Candidate	Votes	%
Republican	Blake Moore (incumbent)	178,434	66.97
Democratic	Rick Jones	87,986	33.03
Total votes		266,420	100
Republican hold			

=== 2024 ===
2024 Utah's 1st congressional district election
Party	Candidate	Votes	%
Republican	Blake Moore (incumbent)	230,975	63.1
Democratic	Bill Campbell	117,319	32.1
Libertarian	Daniel Cottam	17,601	4.8
Total votes		365,895	100.0
Republican hold			

=== 2026 ===
2026 Utah's 1st congressional district election
Party	Candidate	Votes	%	±%
Democratic	Ben McAdams	165,422	70.31	
Republican	Riley Owen	61,230	26.02	
Libertarian	Jesse West	5,227	2.22	
Unaffiliated	Elias H. Montgomery	3,330	1.42	
Write-in		71	0.03	
Total votes				
Democratic win (new seat)				

== See also ==
- Utah's congressional districts
- List of United States congressional districts
