= Richard Richards (Utah politician) =

American politician (1932–2015)

Dick Richards

51st Chair of the Republican National Committee
- In office January 20, 1981 – January 28, 1983
- Preceded by: Bill Brock
- Succeeded by: Frank Fahrenkopf

Personal details
- Born: May 14, 1932 Ogden, Utah, U.S.
- Died: January 30, 2015 (aged 82) Ogden, Utah, U.S.
- Party: Republican
- Education: Weber State University (BA); University of Utah (JD)

Richard Richards (May 14, 1932 – January 30, 2015) was an American political activist who served as chairman of the Republican National Committee from 1981 to 1983. He was active in the Republican Party and politics from the late 1960s until the 1980s. He was born in Ogden, Utah.

Richards served in the United States Army from 1952 until 1955, finishing his service as an officer with the 7th Cavalry Regiment.

Before being drafted, Richards had been active in politics, organizing the Junior Republican League while studying at Weber State College in Ogden, Utah. He graduated from the University of Utah Law School and was active in the political campaigns of Douglas R. Stringfellow, Laurence J. Burton and Dr. Henry Aldous Dixon, organizing a youth group that helped Dr. Dixon win election to the United States Congress. He later served as a member of the Republican National Committee and chairman of the Utah Republican Party, and was the first state chairman to endorse Ronald Reagan for president in 1976.

He resided near Ogden with his wife. Richards was a Latter-day Saint. Richards died at his home on January 30, 2015, at the age of 82.

The Richard Richards Institute for Ethics at Weber State University is named for him.

Weber State University published his autobiography Climbing the Political Ladder, One Rung at a Time in 2006.

== Notes ==
Party political offices
Preceded by Bill Brock	Chair of the Republican National Committee; 1981–1983	Succeeded by Frank Fahrenkopf
