= Jim Hansen (Utah politician) =

American politician (1932–2018)

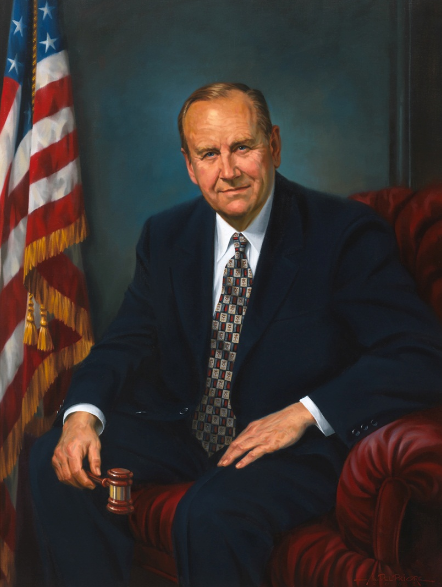

Member of the U.S. House of Representatives from Utah's 1st district
- In office January 3, 1981 – January 3, 2003
- Preceded by: K. Gunn McKay
- Succeeded by: Rob Bishop

Member of the Utah House of Representatives from the 54th district
- In office January 1973 – January 1981
- Preceded by: W. Edward Kerr
- Succeeded by: Edward U. Knowlton

Personal details
- Born: James Vear Hansen; August 14, 1932 Salt Lake City, Utah, U.S.
- Died: November 14, 2018 (aged 86) Farmington, Utah, U.S.
- Party: Republican
- Spouse: Ann Burgoyne
- Children: 5
- Education: University of Utah (BBA)

Military service
- Branch/service: United States Navy
- Years of service: 1951–1955

James Vear Hansen (August 14, 1932 – November 14, 2018) was an American politician from Utah, who was a member of the United States House of Representatives from 1981 to 2003.

== Early life and education ==
Hansen was born in Salt Lake City, graduating from the city's East High School. From 1951 until 1955, he served in the United States Navy. He attended the University of Utah, receiving a business degree from the school in 1961.

== Career ==
The same year that he left college, Hansen was elected to the Farmington City Council. He also worked as an insurance agent.

=== State legislature ===
From 1973 until 1980, Hansen was a member of the Utah House of Representatives, serving as speaker of the house from 1979 until 1980.

=== Congress ===
In 1980, he defeated K. Gunn McKay to represent Utah's 1st congressional district. He faced off against McKay two more times, in 1986 and 1988, prevailing in both races.

Hansen retired on January 3, 2003. Hansen served as chairman of the Committee on Resources in his last term in the 107th Congress.

=== Later career ===
Hansen ran for the governorship in 2004, but was defeated at the Republican convention by Jon Huntsman Jr. who went on to win the election. He was appointed a commissioner on the 2005 Base Realignment and Closure Commission.

== Honors ==
When a portion of U.S. Route 89 in Weber County, Utah was upgraded to freeway standards, it was named the James V. Hansen Highway. The federal building in Ogden, Utah was renamed the James V. Hansen Federal Building in his honor in 2004.

== Personal life ==
Hansen died on November 14, 2018, at the age of 86.

Utah House of Representatives
Preceded by W. Edward Kerr	Member of the Utah House of Representatives from the 54th district 1973–1981	Succeeded by Edward U. Knowlton
U.S. House of Representatives
Preceded by K. Gunn McKay	Member of the U.S. House of Representatives from Utah's 1st congressional district January 3, 1981 – January 3, 2003	Succeeded by Rob Bishop
Preceded by Nancy Johnson; Connecticut	Chairman of the House Ethics Committee; 1997–1999	Succeeded by Lamar S. Smith; Texas
Preceded by Don Young; Alaska	Chairman of the House Resources Committee; 2001–2003	Succeeded by Richard Pombo; California
