= Walter Granger =

Walter Granger may refer to:

- Walter K. Granger (1888–1978), American politician
- Walter W. Granger (1872–1941), American vertebrate palaeontologist
