= Milton H. Welling =

American politician (1876–1947)

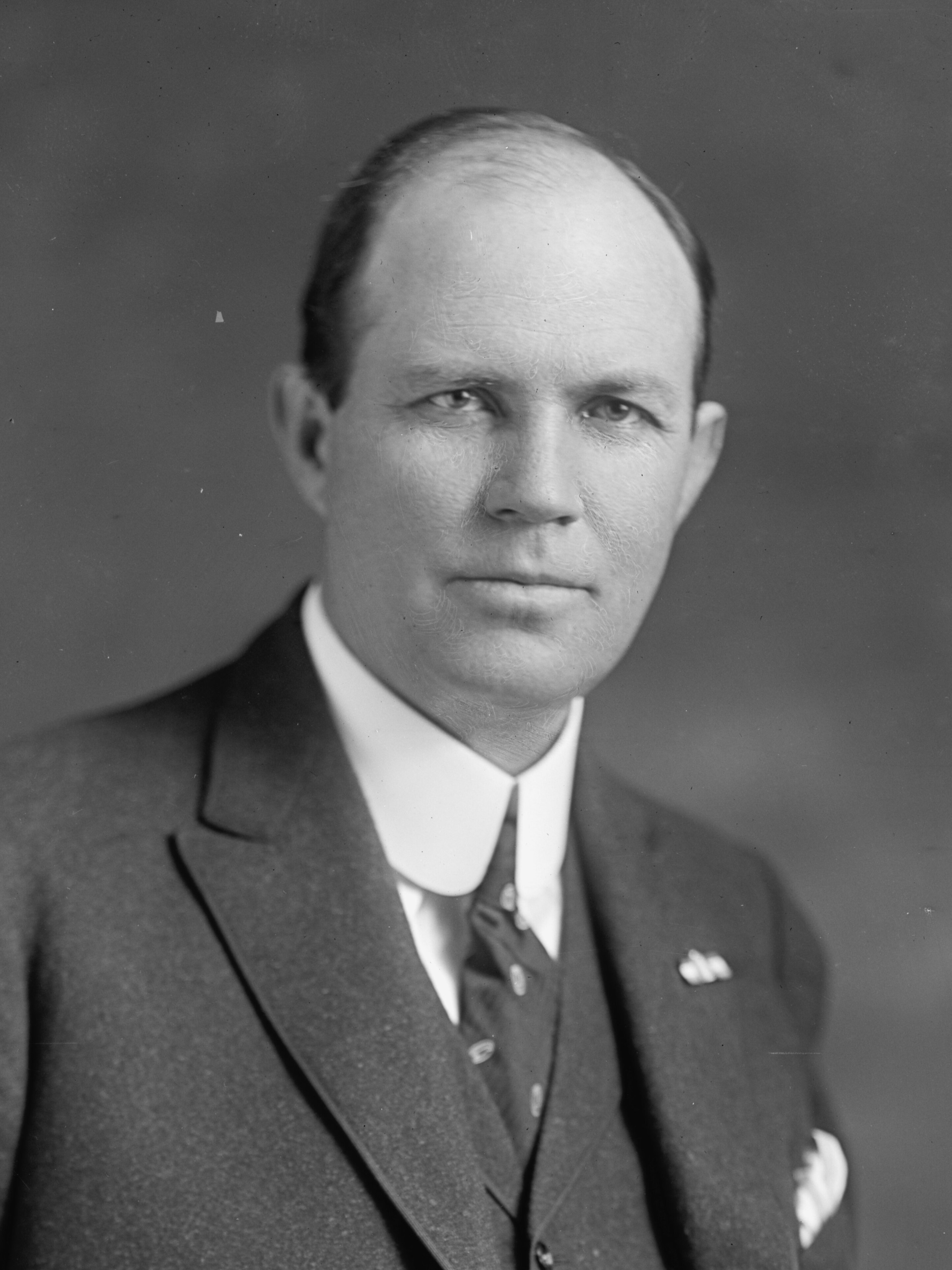

Utah Secretary of State
- In office 1928–1937

Member of the U.S. House of Representatives from Utah's 1st district
- In office March 4, 1917 – March 3, 1921
- Preceded by: Joseph Howell
- Succeeded by: Don B. Colton

Member of the Utah House of Representatives
- In office 1911–1915

Personal details
- Born: January 25, 1876 Farmington, Utah Territory
- Died: May 28, 1947 (aged 71) Salt Lake City, Utah
- Resting place: Fielding Cemetery, Fielding, Utah
- Party: Democratic
- Spouse(s): Sarah Brackett; Alice Ward
- Children: 5
- Education: University of Utah

Milton Holmes Welling (January 25, 1876 – May 28, 1947) was an American businessman, banker, and politician who served two terms as a U.S. representative from Utah from 1917 to 1921.

== Early life and education ==
Born in Farmington, Utah Territory, Welling attended the common schools, the Latter-day Saints' University, and the University of Utah, the last of which he received a degree from. From 1896 to 1898 Welling served as a missionary for the Church of Jesus Christ of Latter-day Saints (LDS Church) in the church's Southern States Mission.

== Career ==
He worked in agriculture, trade, and banking. Starting in 1902, Welling was the president of the LDS Church's Malad Stake headquartered in Malad, Idaho. He was elected a member of the board of trustees of Brigham Young College, Logan, Utah, in 1906.

When the Bear River Stake of the LDS Church, based in Garland, Utah was organized in 1908, Welling became its first president. He filled this role until 1917.

== Political career ==
Welling served in the Utah House of Representatives from 1911 to 1915.

=== Congress ===
Welling was elected as a Democrat to the Sixty-fifth and Sixty-sixth Congresses (March 4, 1917 – March 3, 1921). He did not seek renomination, but was an unsuccessful Democratic candidate for the United States Senate in 1920.

== Later career ==
Welling served as director of registration for the State of Utah 1925–1928. Welling also served as president of the Bear River Stake again from 1925–1929.

Welling was elected secretary of state of Utah in 1928. He was reelected in 1932 and served until January 1, 1937. Meanwhile, he served on the Board of Trustees of Utah State Agricultural College from 1926 to 1936 and as a Regent over the University of Utah from 1928 to 1936. After fulfilling these responsibilities, Welling was appointed by Secretary of Interior Harold L. Ickes to make a survey of public grazing lands in 1937 and 1938. Later, he resumed agricultural and mining operations.

== Death and burial ==
In January 1943, Welling accepted war service appointment as auditor with Army Air Forces and also served with the War Assets Administration at Salt Lake City, Utah, until his death May 28, 1947.

He was interred in Fielding Cemetery, Fielding, Utah.

== Sources ==
- United States Congress. "Milton H. Welling (id: W000278)". Biographical Directory of the United States Congress.

Party political offices
Preceded by James Moyle	Democratic nominee for U.S. Senator from Utah (Class 3); 1920	Succeeded by Ashby Snow
U.S. House of Representatives
Preceded by Joseph Howell	Member of the U.S. House of Representatives from Utah's 1st congressional district 1917–1921	Succeeded by Don B. Colton
