= Abe Murdock =

American politician

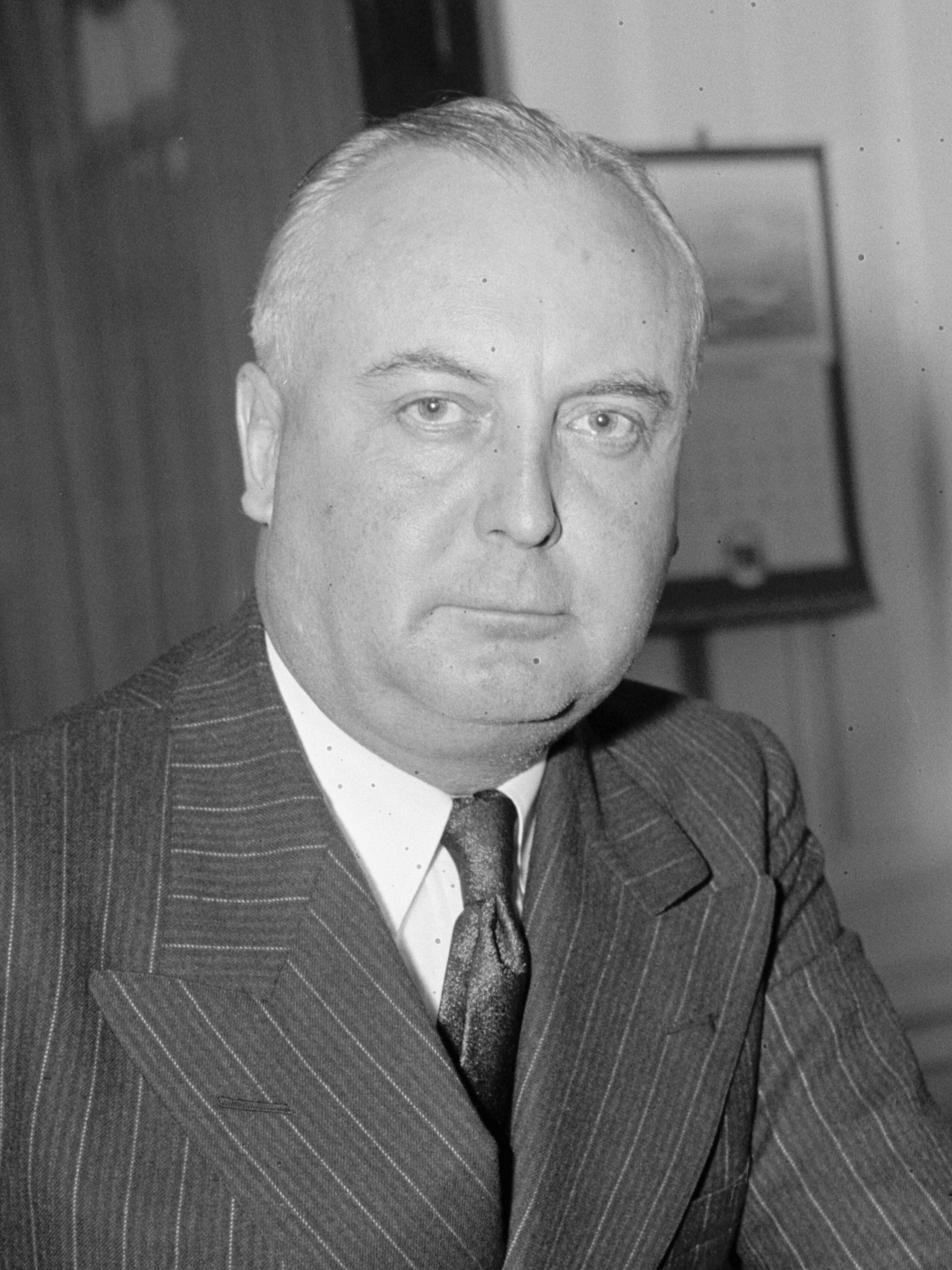

Member of the National Labor Relations Board
- In office August 1, 1947 – December 16, 1957

United States Senator from Utah
- In office January 3, 1941 – January 3, 1947
- Preceded by: William H. King
- Succeeded by: Arthur V. Watkins

Member of the U.S. House of Representatives from Utah's 1st district
- In office March 4, 1933 – January 3, 1941
- Preceded by: Don B. Colton
- Succeeded by: Walter K. Granger

Personal details
- Born: Orrice Abram Murdock Jr. July 18, 1893 Austin, Nevada, U.S.
- Died: September 15, 1979 (aged 86) Bethesda, Maryland, U.S.
- Resting place: Mountain View Cemetery in Beaver, Utah
- Party: Democratic
- Spouse: Mary Violet Yardley Murdock
- Children: 6
- Education: University of Utah

Orrice Abram Murdock Jr. (July 18, 1893 – September 15, 1979) was an American attorney and politician who served as a member of both chambers of the United States Congress for Utah. From 1947 to 1957, he served as a member of the National Labor Relations Board.

== Early life and education ==
Born in Austin, Nevada, he moved with his parents to Beaver, Utah, in 1898. Murdock attended the public schools and Murdock Academy in Beaver, and the University of Utah at Salt Lake City.

== Career ==
Murdock studied law and was admitted to the bar in 1922.

=== Early political career ===
He was a member of the Beaver city council in 1920 and 1921 and was county attorney in 1923–1924, 1927–1928, and 1931–1932. He served as city attorney of Beaver from 1926 to 1933, and was an unsuccessful Democratic candidate for district attorney for the fifth Utah district in 1928.

=== Congress ===
In 1932, Murdock ran for and was elected as a Democrat to the Seventy-third Congress and was reelected to the three succeeding Congresses, serving from March 4, 1933, to January 3, 1941.

=== Senate ===
Instead of running for reelection in 1940, he challenged incumbent Senator William H. King for the Democratic nomination. King had opposed President Franklin Delano Roosevelt's proposal to expand the Supreme Court and Roosevelt's candidacy for an unprecedented third term, while Murdock was a "100% New Dealer" who strongly supported Roosevelt. Murdock defeated King for the nomination and was elected as a Democrat to the Senate, serving from January 3, 1941, to January 3, 1947.

Murdock was defeated by Republican Arthur Vivian Watkins in his bid for reelection in 1946.

== Later career ==
After his defeat, he resumed the practice of law and engaged in agricultural pursuits and livestock raising. From 1947 to 1957, he was a member of the National Labor Relations Board and in 1960 was a member of the Atomic Energy Labor-Management Relations Panel.

== Death and burial ==
Murdock died of natural causes in Bethesda, Maryland, in 1979, and was interred in Mountain View Cemetery in Beaver, Utah.

== Electoral history ==
1932 United States House of Representatives elections
Party	Candidate	Votes	%
Democratic	Abe Murdock	47,774	51.59
Republican	Don B. Colton (Incumbent)	44,827	48.41
Total votes		92,601	100.0
Democratic gain from Republican			

1934 United States House of Representatives elections
Party	Candidate	Votes	%
Democratic	Abe Murdock (Incumbent)	55,800	64.43
Republican	Arthur Woolley	29,878	34.51
Socialist	William J. McConnell	644	0.74
Communist	Lawrence Mower	279	0.32
Total votes		86,601	100.0
Democratic hold			

1936 United States House of Representatives elections
Party	Candidate	Votes	%
Democratic	Abe Murdock (Incumbent)	68,877	69.23
Republican	Charles W. Dunn	30,415	30.57
Socialist	William J. McConnell	202	0.20
Total votes		99,494	100.0
Democratic hold			

1938 United States House of Representatives elections
Party	Candidate	Votes	%
Democratic	Abe Murdock (Incumbent)	52,927	59.66
Republican	LeRoy B. Young	35,790	40.34
Total votes		88,717	100.0
Democratic hold			

1940 United States Senate election in Utah
Party	Candidate	Votes	%
Democratic	Abe Murdock	155,499	62.85
Republican	Philo Farnsworth	91,931	37.15
Majority		63,568	25.70
Turnout		247,430	
Democratic hold			

1946 United States Senate election in Utah
Party	Candidate	Votes	%
Republican	Arthur Vivian Watkins	101,142	51.24%
Democratic	Abe Murdock (incumbent)	96,257	48.76%
Majority		4,885	2.48%
Turnout		197,399	
Republican gain from Democratic			

Party political offices
Preceded by William H. King	Democratic nominee for U.S. Senator from Utah (Class 1); 1940, 1946	Succeeded by Walter K. Granger
U.S. House of Representatives
Preceded by Don B. Colton	Member of the U.S. House of Representatives from Utah's 1st congressional district 1933–1941	Succeeded by Walter K. Granger
U.S. Senate
Preceded by William H. King	U.S. senator (Class 1) from Utah; 1941–1947; Served alongside: Elbert D. Thomas	Succeeded by Arthur V. Watkins
