= Don B. Colton =

American politician (1876–1952)

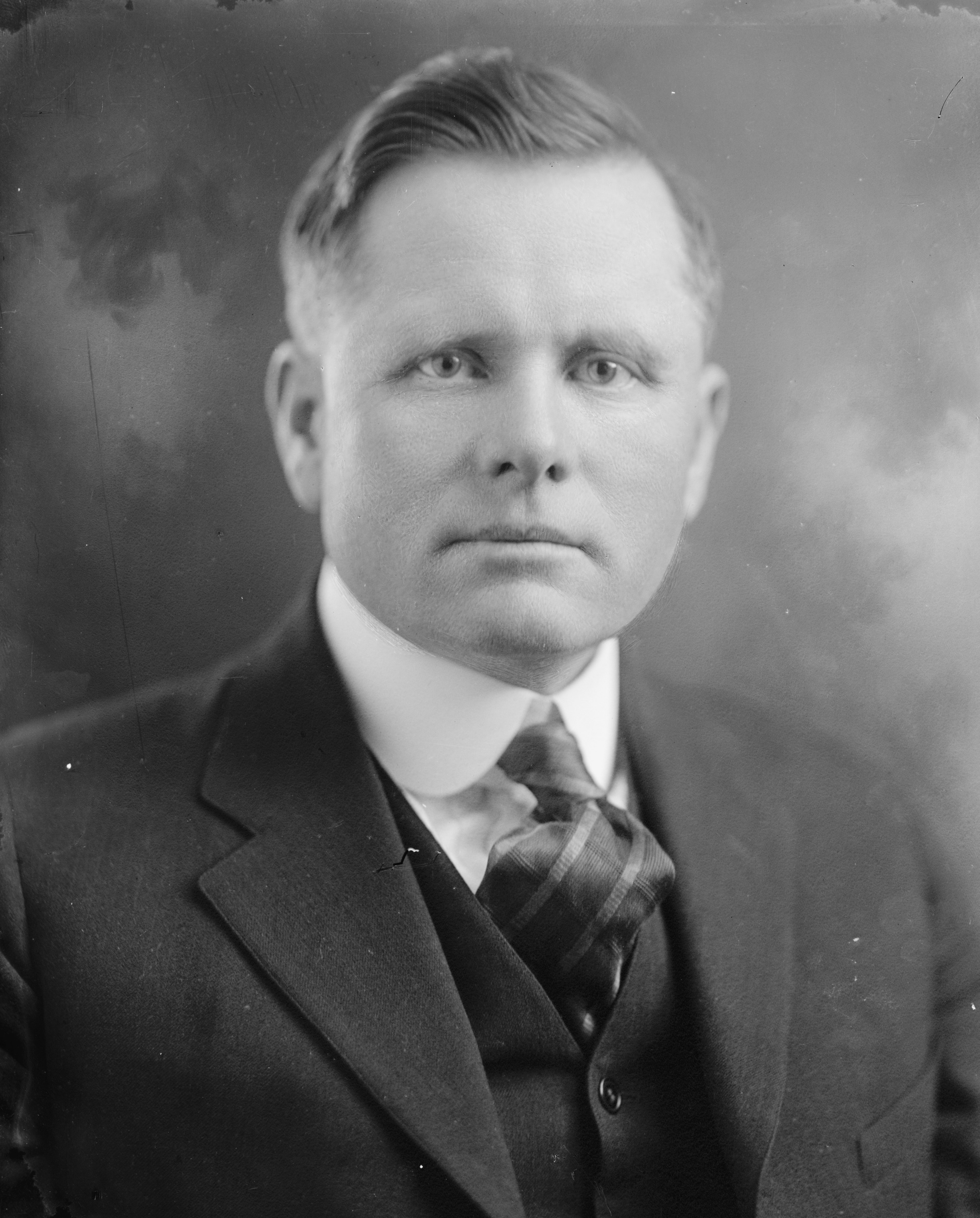

Member of the U.S. House of Representatives from Utah's 1st district
- In office March 4, 1921 – March 3, 1933
- Preceded by: Milton H. Welling
- Succeeded by: Abe Murdock

Member of the Utah Senate
- In office 1915–1917

Member of the Utah House of Representatives
- In office 1903

Personal details
- Born: Don Byron Colton; September 15, 1876 Mona, Utah Territory
- Died: August 1, 1952 (aged 75) Salt Lake City, Utah, U.S.
- Resting place: Wasatch Lawn Cemetery
- Party: Republican
- Spouse(s): Mazie Hall; Grace Stringham
- Children: 4
- Education: Brigham Young University; University of Michigan Law School

Don Byron Colton (September 15, 1876 – August 1, 1952) was an American lawyer and politician who served six consecutive terms as a U.S. representative from Utah from 1921 to 1933.

== Early life ==
Born near Mona, Juab County, Utah Territory, Colton moved with his parents to Uintah County, Utah Territory in 1879. He attended the public schools and the Uintah Academy, Vernal, Utah. He was graduated from the commercial department of Brigham Young University, Provo, Utah, in 1896. He graduated from the law department of the University of Michigan at Ann Arbor in 1905. He was admitted to the bar the same year and commenced practice in Vernal, Utah.

== Political career ==
Colton was receiver of the United States land office at Vernal from 1905 to 1914. He served as delegate to the Republican National Conventions in 1904, 1924, and 1928 as well as a delegate to the Republican State conventions from in 1914 and 1924. He was an unsuccessful candidate for United States Senator in 1934.

=== Utah House of Representatives ===
Colton served as member of the Utah House of Representatives in 1903. He also served as member of the State senate from 1915 to 1917.

=== Congress ===
Colton was elected as a Republican to the Sixty-seventh and to the five succeeding Congresses (March 4, 1921 – March 3, 1933). He served as chairman of the Committee on Elections No. 1 (Sixty-ninth and Seventieth Congresses), Committee on Public Lands (Seventieth and Seventy-first Congresses). He was an unsuccessful candidate for reelection in 1932 to the Seventy-third Congress. While in Congress Colton served as the Sunday School teacher for the LDS Church Sunday School in Washington, D.C.

=== Campaign for governor ===
He was an unsuccessful candidate for Governor of Utah in 1940, losing the race to Herbert Maw 52% to 48%.

== Professional career ==
He engaged in teaching in 1898, 1901, and 1902. Colton resumed the practice of law in Vernal, Utah.

From 1910 to 1921 Colton served as the president of the Uintah Stake of the Church of Jesus Christ of Latter-day Saints (LDS Church). From 1933 to 1937, Colton served as president of the Eastern States Mission of the LDS Church.

He moved to Salt Lake City in 1937 and continued the practice of law.

He also engaged in farming, ranching, sheep and stock raising, and other business enterprises.

== Death ==
Colton died in Salt Lake City, Utah, August 1, 1952. Immediately prior to this he was serving as the head of the LDS Church mission home in Salt Lake City. Colton had been serving in this position since he had taken over from J. Wyley Sessions in 1938.

Colton was interred in Wasatch Lawn Cemetery.

== Electoral history ==
1920 United States House of Representatives elections
Party	Candidate	Votes	%
Republican	Don B. Colton	42,249	57.49
Democratic	James W. Funk	28,160	38.32
Farmer–Labor	John O. Watters	3,083	4.19
Total votes		73,492	100.0
Republican gain from Democratic			

1922 United States House of Representatives elections
Party	Candidate	Votes	%
Republican	Don B. Colton (Incumbent)	33,188	52.73
Democratic	Milton H. Welling	27,801	44.17
Farmer–Labor	John O. Watters	1,949	3.10
Total votes		62,938	100.0
Republican hold			

1924 United States House of Representatives elections
Party	Candidate	Votes	%
Republican	Don B. Colton (Incumbent)	40,883	54.86
Democratic	Frank Francis	33,644	45.14
Total votes		74,527	100.0
Republican hold			

1926 United States House of Representatives elections
Party	Candidate	Votes	%
Republican	Don B. Colton (Incumbent)	44,007	61.44
Democratic	Ephraim Bergeson	27,198	37.97
Socialist	John O. Watters	426	0.59
Total votes		71,631	100.0
Republican hold			

1928 United States House of Representatives elections
Party	Candidate	Votes	%
Republican	Don B. Colton (Incumbent)	50,274	60.89
Democratic	Knox Patterson	31,889	38.62
Socialist	John O. Watters	408	0.49
Total votes		82,571	100.0
Republican hold			

1930 United States House of Representatives elections
Party	Candidate	Votes	%
Republican	Don B. Colton (Incumbent)	45,875	60.77
Democratic	Joseph Ririe	29,210	38.70
Socialist	A. W. Clemons	402	0.53
Total votes		75,487	100.0
Republican hold			

== Sources ==
- United States Congress. "Don B. Colton (id: C000652)". Biographical Directory of the United States Congress.

Party political offices
Preceded by Ernest Bamberger	Republican nominee for U.S. Senator from Utah (Class 1); 1934	Succeeded by Philo Farnsworth
Preceded by Ray E. Dillman	Republican nominee for Governor of Utah; 1940	Succeeded by J. Bracken Lee
U.S. House of Representatives
Preceded by Milton H. Welling	Member of the U.S. House of Representatives from Utah's 1st congressional district 1921–1933	Succeeded by Abe Murdock
