= J. Keith Melville =

American political scientist

J. Keith Melville (September 22, 1921 – June 15, 1995) was a political science professor at Brigham Young University (BYU) and the chairman of the Utah Democratic Party.

Melville was raised in Delta, Utah and also in Salt Lake City, Utah. He graduated from West High School in Salt Lake City and then began his studies at the University of Utah. He served in the United States military during World War II as the captain of a B-17 bomber. He has a master's degree from the University of California, Berkeley and a Ph.D. from the University of Utah. His doctoral dissertation was entitled "The Political Ideas of Brigham Young".

Melville married Ruth Weller in the Salt Lake City Temple in 1947. They were the parents of 9 children.

Melville began his teaching career at Ricks College (now Brigham Young University–Idaho) where he taught for seven years. He later was a professor in the BYU political science department for 42 years.

Amongst other position in the LDS Church Melville twice served as a bishop.

In 1966 Melville was the unsuccessful Democratic candidate for one of Utah's First Congressional District, losing to Laurence Burton.

== Publications ==
- Conflict and Compromise (1974)
- The American Democratic System (1974)
- Highlights in Mormon Political History, Brgham Young University Press, second publication in the Merrill Monograph Series, 1967
- "The First Lady and the Cowgirl" in Pacific Historical Review Vol. 57, no. 1 (Feb. 1988).
- Feminine Contributions to Mormon Culture: The Poetic Theology of Eliza Roxy Snow
- "Joseph Smith, The Constitution and Individual Liberties" in BYU Studies Vol. 28 (1987) no. 2.
- Conflict and Compromise: The Mormons in Mid-Nineteenth Century American Politics (Provo: BYU Press, 1974)
- Salt Lake Tribune September 11, 1966.

== Sources ==
- Deseret News June 16, 1995 obituary of Melville
