= Frank Fahrenkopf =

American attorney and lobbyist

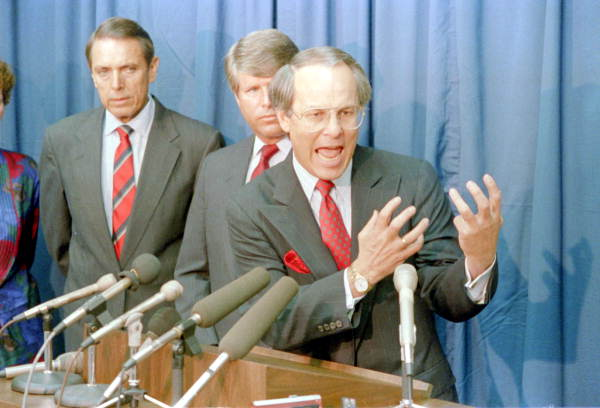
- Fahrenkopf speaks at a press conference in Tallahassee, Florida in 1988

Chair of the Republican National Committee
- In office January 28, 1983 – January 18, 1989 Serving with Paul Laxalt (1983–1987)
- Preceded by: Richard Richards
- Succeeded by: Lee Atwater

Personal details
- Born: August 28, 1939 (age 87) New York City, New York, U.S.
- Party: Republican
- Spouse: Mary Fahrenkopf
- Children: 3
- Education: University of Nevada, Reno (BA); University of California, Berkeley (JD)
- *Fahrenkopf served as National Chair of the RNC while Laxalt served as General Chair from January 28, 1983 – January 23, 1987.

Frank J. Fahrenkopf Jr. (born August 28, 1939) is an American attorney, political executive, and lobbyist who was chairman of the Republican National Committee from 1983 to 1989. Fahrenkopf is co-founder, and currently co-chairman, of the Commission on Presidential Debates, which conducts the United States general election presidential and vice presidential debates. In the private sector, Fahrenkopf most recently served as the American Gaming Association's first president, and retired from the position in 2013.

== Early life and education ==
Fahrenkopf was born in Brooklyn, New York, on August 28, 1939. He is a 1958 graduate of Reno High School. In 1962, Fahrenkopf graduated from the University of Nevada, Reno, where he was a member of Alpha Tau Omega fraternity. In 1965 he graduated from the Boalt Hall School of Law at the University of California, Berkeley.

== Career ==
=== Early legal work ===
After graduating from law school, Fahrenkopf was hired as an associate by the Reno law firm of Breen and Young. In 1967, he left that firm to become a partner in Sanford, Sanford, Fahrenkopf, and Mousel, another Reno law firm, and also taught criminal law at the University of Nevada. He remained a partner in the firm until 1975, when he founded Fahrenkopf, Mortimer, Sourwine, Mousel and Sloane. The new firm's clients included hotels, casinos, liquor vendors, and construction companies. Also in the 1970s, Fahrenkopf was retained by the Washington law firm of Hogan & Hartson.

=== Politics prior to the RNC ===
In 1965, just out of law school, Fahrenkopf met all the members of the Nevada Young Republicans Club; a week later, Fahrenkopf was elected chairman of the club. Within two years the club had more than 500 members. In 1972, Fahrenkopf was the Northern Nevada co-chairman of President Richard Nixon's reelection campaign. He was general counsel to the Nevada Republican Committee from 1972 to 1975 and its chairman from 1975 to 1983.

At the national level, Fahrenkopf became a member of the Republican National Committee in 1975. He was a delegate to the Republican National Conventions in 1972, 1976, and 1980. From 1977 to 1979 he was a member of the Republican National Committee's executive committee. From 1981 to 1983, he was the national chairman of the Republican State Chairman's Association.

=== RNC ===
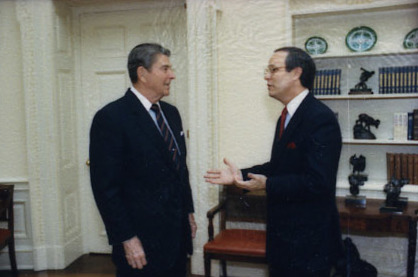
Fahrenkopf with President Ronald Reagan in 1988

In January 1983, Fahrenkopf was elected chairman of the Republican National Committee. Betty Heitman of Baton Rouge, Louisiana, served as his co-chairwoman from 1983 to 1987. In 1983, Fahrenkopf was a founder of the National Endowment for Democracy, where he served as vice chairman and a board member from 1983 to 1993. In 1984, he founded the International Republican Institute, on which he continues to serve as a board member. In 1986 he co-founded the Commission on Presidential Debates with Democratic National Committee chairman Paul G. Kirk.

Fahrenkopf served for many years as chairman of the Pacific Democrat Union and vice chairman of the International Democrat Union, a worldwide association of conservative political parties from the United States, Great Britain, France, Germany, Canada, Japan, Australia and twenty other nations.

In 1985, Fahrenkopf was again hired by the firm Hogan & Hartson, as a "special partner", where he was paid at least $100,000 a year. While RNC head, he also worked for two Nevada law firms, and was a director of First Republic Bank Corporation of California.

Fahrenkopf was the longest-serving chairman of the RNC in the 20th century and the second-longest in the history of the Republican Party, leaving in 1989.

=== Post-RNC and other involvement ===
In 1989, Fahrenkopf became a full partner in the Washington, D.C., office of Hogan & Hartson, where he chaired the International Trade Practice Group. On June 1, 1995, he became the American Gaming Association's first chief executive. He is a member of the board of directors of the International Republican Institute.

Fahrenkopf serves as the co-chair of the Commission on Presidential Debates .

Fahrenkopf also sits on the board of directors of six New York Stock Exchange public companies: First Republic Bank, Gabelli Equity Trust, Inc., Gabelli Utility Trust, Gabelli Global Multimedia Trust, Gabelli Dividend and Income Trust, and Gabelli Gold and Natural Resources.

His civic involvement includes service as chairman of the board of governors of the City Club of Washington, a member of the board of trustees of the E.L. Wiegand Foundation, The Economic Club of Washington and the Federal City Council. Fahrenkopf also served as a co-chairman of the Rivlin Commission, which investigated and reported on the government of the District of Columbia. He has been honored for his contributions, receiving the Junior Chamber of Commerce Distinguished Service Award in 1973, the Nevada Lung Association "Man of the Year" Award in 1983 and the National Humanitarian of the Year Award from the National Conference on Christians and Jews in 1985. He is a member of the Sovereign Military Order of Malta. He also serves as a trustee of the Culinary Institute of America and is a member of the advisory board of the Ladies Professional Golf Association (LPGA).

He has also been a frequent commentator on political and gaming issues on such news television programs as Crossfire, Inside Politics, Meet The Press, Hardball, Face the Nation, The Today Show, This Week and Good Morning America.

In Fall of 2014, Fahrenkopf was a Fellow at the Harvard Institute of Politics at the Harvard Kennedy School.

== Personal life ==
Fahrenkopf and his wife, the former Mary Bandoni, have three daughters: Allison, Vice President and Associate General Counsel, PMI North America; Leslie, former associate White House Counsel to President George W. Bush; and Amy, a physician and President of HSS Health at Hospital for Special Surgery in New York City. He is an avid golfer, tennis player and sports enthusiast.

Party political offices
Preceded by Richard Richards	Chair of the Republican National Committee; 1983–1989; Served alongside: Paul Laxalt (General Chair, 1983–1987)	Succeeded by Lee Atwater
