= Joseph Howell =

American politician

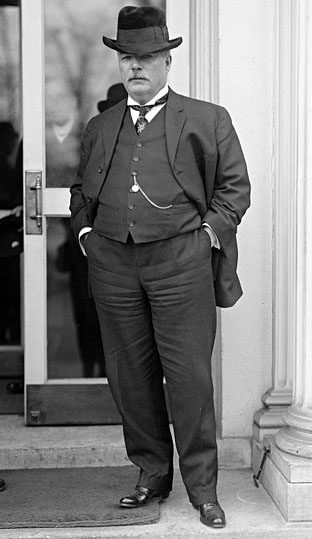

Member of the U.S. House of Representatives from Utah
- In office March 4, 1913 – March 3, 1917
- Preceded by: George Sutherland
- Succeeded by: Milton H. Welling
- Constituency: Utah at-large (1903–13); 1st district (1913–17)

Member of the Utah Senate
- In office 1896-1900

Personal details
- Born: February 17, 1857 Brigham City, Utah Territory
- Died: July 18, 1918 (aged 61) Logan, Utah
- Resting place: Logan City Cemetery
- Party: Republican
- Spouse: Mary Maughan
- Children: 9
- Education: University of Utah

Joseph Howell (February 17, 1857 – July 18, 1918) was an American businessman and politician who served seven terms as a U.S. representative from Utah from 1903 to 1917.

== Life and career ==
Born in Brigham City, Utah Territory, Howell moved with his parents to Wellsville, Utah, in 1863. He attended the common schools and the University of Utah at Salt Lake City.

=== Early career ===
He taught school, engaged in mercantile pursuits, and served as mayor of Wellsville from 1882 to 1884.

Howell served in the territorial House of Representatives from 1886 to 1892. After Utah gained statehood, Howell served as member of the State senate from 1896 to 1900. He was also regent of the University of Utah from 1896 to 1900. Howell moved to Logan, Utah, in 1901.

=== Personal life ===
Howell married Mary Maughan and their daughter Barabara Howell Richards served as a member of the Relief Society General Board.

=== Congress ===
Howell was elected as a Republican to House of Representatives for the Fifty-eighth and to the six succeeding Congresses (March 4, 1903 - March 3, 1917).

Howell was involved in getting appropriations for the Mormon colonists who had fled Mexico in 1912.

== After Congress ==
Howell engaged in banking and the real estate business. The town of Howell, Utah, founded about 1910 on land owned by one of his business interests in Box Elder County, was named for him.

=== Death and burial ===
He died in Logan, Utah, July 18, 1918, and was interred in the Logan City Cemetery.

== Electoral history ==
Note: The 1912 election consisted of an all-party election for the two at-large seats. Howell was elected to the first at-large seat, while Johnson was elected to the second at-large seat.

1912 United States House of Representatives elections
Party	Candidate	Votes	%
Republican	Joseph Howell	43,133	19.45
Republican	Jacob Johnson	42,047	18.96
Democratic	Mathonihah Thomas	37,192	16.77
Democratic	Tollman D. Johnson	36,640	16.52
Progressive	S.H. Love	22,358	10.08
Progressive	Lewis Larson	21,934	9.89
Socialist	Murray E. King	8,971	4.05
Socialist	William M. Knerr	8,953	4.04
Socialist Labor	Elias Anderson	505	0.23
Total votes		221,733	100.0
Republican win (new seat)			

=== 1914 ===
1914 United States House of Representatives elections
Party	Candidate	Votes	%
Republican	Joseph Howell (Incumbent)	29,481	49.36
Democratic	Lewis Larson	27,440	45.94
Socialist	Ben Jansen	2,812	4.70
Total votes		59,733	100.0
Republican hold			

== See also ==
- Parley Parker Christensen, Utah and California politician, opposed Howell.

== Sources ==
U.S. House of Representatives
Preceded by District created	Member of the U.S. House of Representatives from Utah's 1st congressional district 1913–1917	Succeeded by Milton H. Welling
