= M. Blaine Peterson =

American congressman (1906–1985)

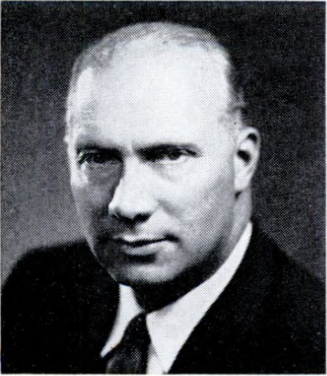
- Official congressional photo

Member of the U.S. House of Representatives from Utah's 1st district
- In office January 3, 1961 – January 3, 1963
- Preceded by: Henry A. Dixon
- Succeeded by: Laurence J. Burton

Member of the Utah State Legislature
- In office 1955–1957

Personal details
- Born: March 26, 1906 Ogden, Utah, U.S.
- Died: July 15, 1985 (aged 79) Ogden, Utah, U.S.
- Party: Democratic
- Spouse: Mary Lucile Parry
- Children: 4
- Education: Georgetown University University of Utah
- Occupation: Lawyer

Morris Blaine Peterson (March 26, 1906 – July 15, 1985) was a U.S. representative from Utah.

== Biography ==
Born in Ogden, Utah, Peterson's father was an immigrant from Norway. He attended the public schools and Weber College before graduating from the University of Utah in 1931 and from Georgetown Law School in 1938. He was a law clerk to Justice Eugene E. Pratt of the Utah Supreme Court and served as Weber County attorney. He engaged in the private practice of law in 1941 and served in the Utah State legislature 1955-1957. Peterson married M. Lucile Parry on May 18, 1932, and they had four children.

== Congress ==
Peterson was elected as a Democrat to the Eighty-seventh Congress (January 3, 1961 – January 3, 1963) in an extremely close election against A. Walter Stevenson. Peterson won by just 68 votes.

He was an unsuccessful candidate for reelection in 1962 to the Eighty-eighth Congress.

== Later career and death ==
After leaving Congress, he served as chairman of the Weber County, Utah, Taxpayers Association. He served as special consultant to director of Food for Peace Program, 1963. Having served as a young man in Leipzig, Germany, as a missionary for the Church of Jesus Christ of Latter-day Saints, Peterson later served as president of the Southern Germany Mission from 1970 to 1973.

He was a resident of Ogden until his death there July 15, 1985. He was interred in Ogden City Cemetery.

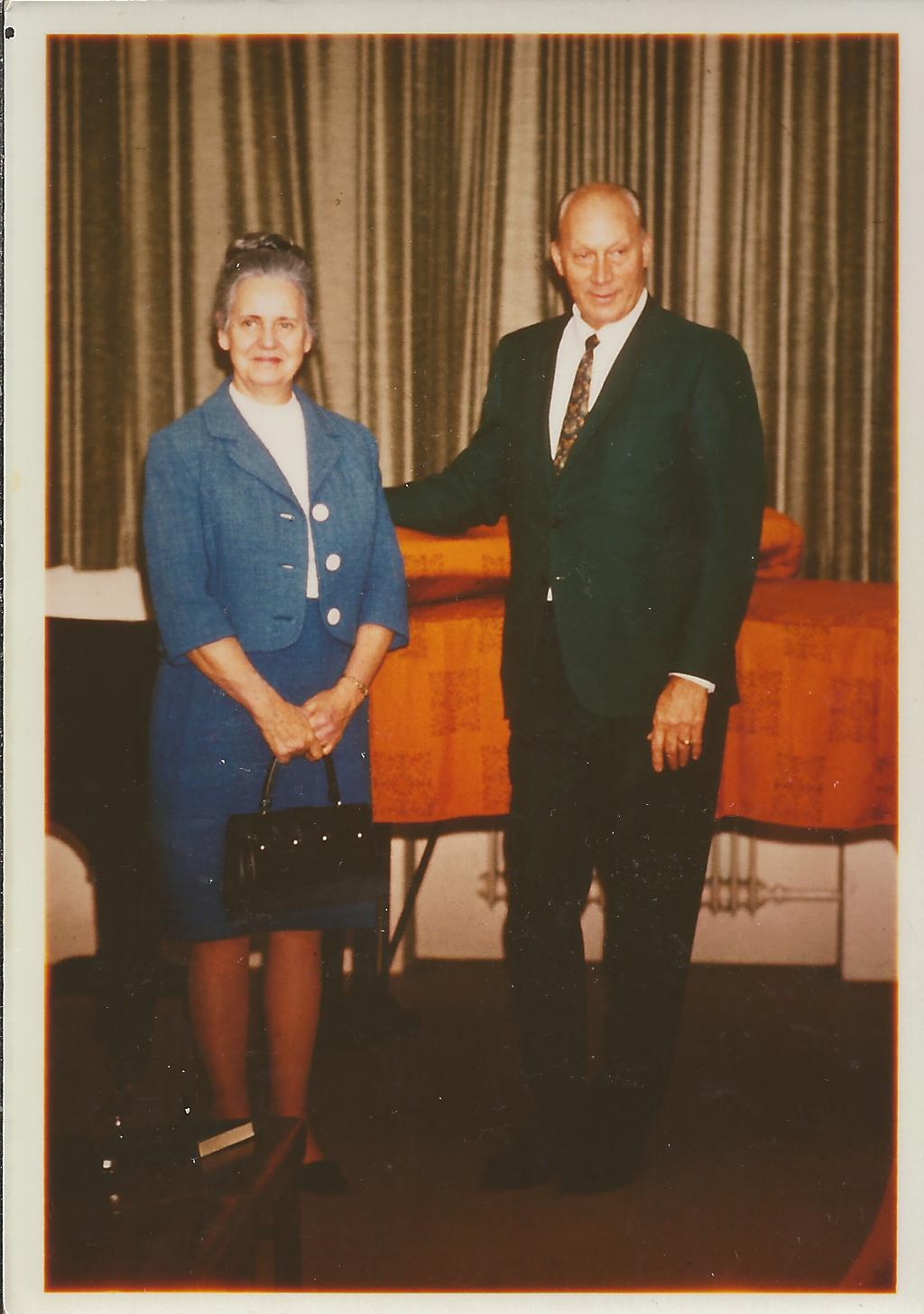
Picture taken in 1971 in Nuremberg, Germany, while M. Blaine Peterson was serving as a Mission President for The Church of Jesus Christ of Latter-day Saints.

== Electoral results ==
1960 United States House of Representatives elections
Party	Candidate	Votes	%
Democratic	M. Blaine Peterson	65,939	50.03
Republican	A. Walter Stevenson	65,871	49.97
Total votes		131,810	100.0
Democratic gain from Republican			

1962 United States House of Representatives elections
Party	Candidate	Votes	%
Republican	Laurence J. Burton	59,032	50.88
Democratic	M. Blaine Peterson (Incumbent)	56,989	49.12
Total votes		116,021	100.0
Republican gain from Democratic			

U.S. House of Representatives
Preceded by Henry A. Dixon	Member of the U.S. House of Representatives from Utah's 1st congressional district 1961–1963	Succeeded by Laurence J. Burton
