= William H. King =

American politician and judge (1863–1949)

William King
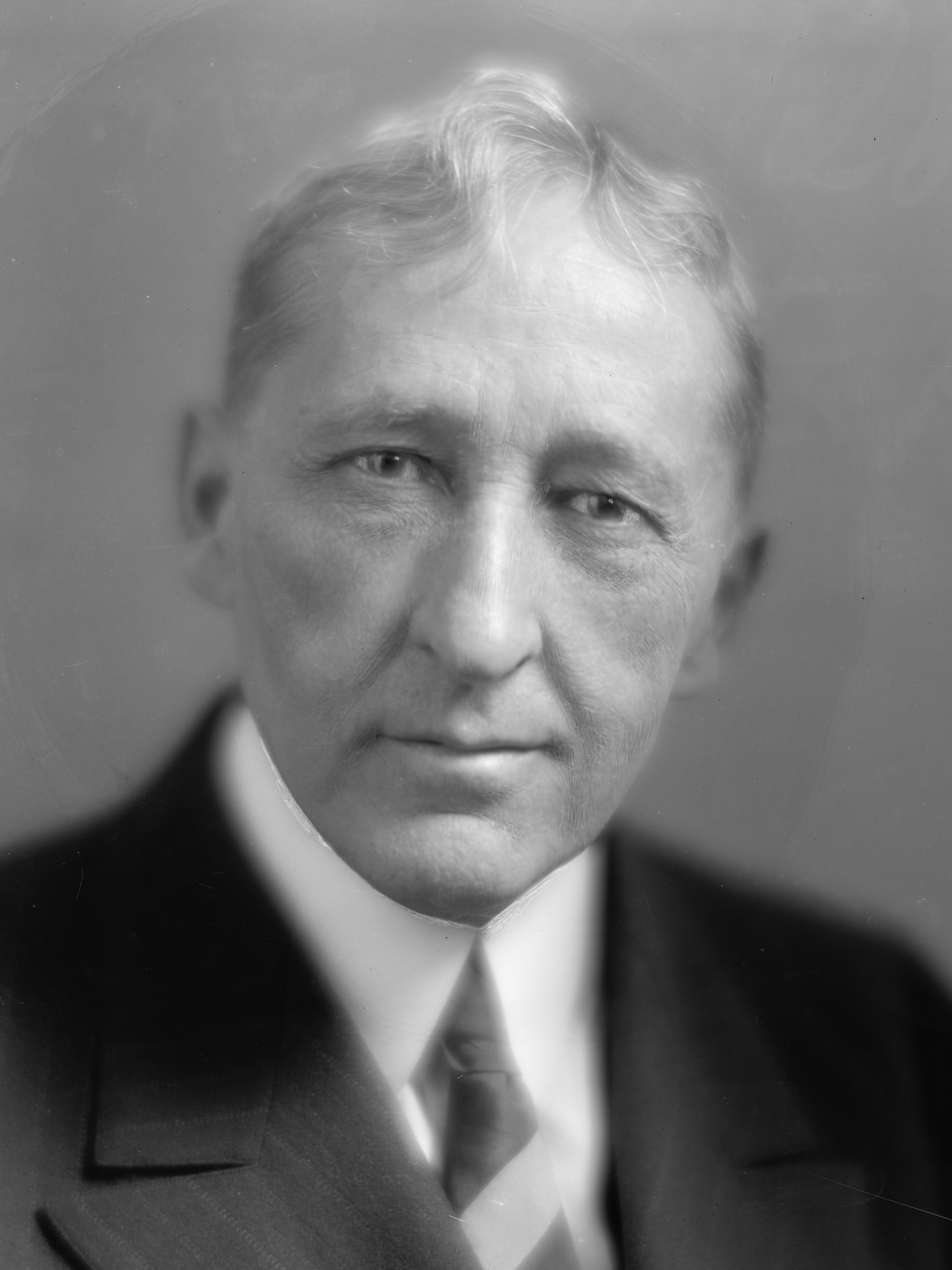

President pro tempore of the United States Senate
- In office November 19, 1940 – January 3, 1941
- Preceded by: Key Pittman
- Succeeded by: Pat Harrison

Secretary of the Senate Democratic Caucus
- In office March 4, 1917 – March 3, 1927
- Leader: Thomas S. Martin; Gilbert Hitchcock (acting); Oscar Underwood; Joseph Taylor Robinson
- Preceded by: Key Pittman (acting)
- Succeeded by: Hugo Black

United States Senator from Utah
- In office March 4, 1917 – January 3, 1941
- Preceded by: George Sutherland
- Succeeded by: Abe Murdock

Member of the U.S. House of Representatives from Utah's at-large district
- In office April 2, 1900 – March 3, 1901
- Preceded by: B. H. Roberts (elect)*
- Succeeded by: George Sutherland
- In office March 4, 1897 – March 3, 1899
- Preceded by: Clarence Emir Allen
- Succeeded by: B. H. Roberts (elect)*

Personal details
- Born: William Henry King; June 3, 1863 Fillmore, Utah Territory
- Died: November 27, 1949 (aged 86) Salt Lake City, Utah, U.S.
- Resting place: Salt Lake City Cemetery
- Party: Democratic
- Spouses: Annie Lyman (m. 1889; died 1906) Vera Sjodahl (m. 1912)
- Children: 7, including David
- Relatives: Culbert L. Olson (first cousin)
- Education: University of Utah; University of Michigan, Ann Arbor (LLB)
- *Roberts was denied from being seated.

William Henry King (June 3, 1863 – November 27, 1949) was an American lawyer, politician, and jurist from Salt Lake City, Utah. A Democrat, King represented Utah in the United States Senate from 1917 until 1941.

== Life ==
King was born in Fillmore, Utah Territory, to Josephine (née Henry) and William King. He graduated from Brigham Young Academy in Provo, Utah and attended the University of Deseret (now University of Utah) in Salt Lake City. He served as a missionary of the Church of Jesus Christ of Latter-day Saints in Great Britain from 1880 to 1883.

After holding local offices and serving two terms in the territorial legislature, he graduated from the law department of the University of Michigan at Ann Arbor. He later joined the Utah bar and practiced law. He held other territorial offices and was appointed as an associate justice of the Utah Supreme Court, serving between 1894 and 1896.

After Utah became a state in 1896, King was elected to the United States House of Representatives and served in the 55th Congress from March 4, 1897 to March 3, 1899. He was not nominated for a second term, but when his replacement, B. H. Roberts, was denied his seat because he was a polygamist, King was elected to complete Roberts's term. He served from April 2, 1900 to March 3, 1901. He ran for the same position in 1900 and again in 1902, but lost both times.

King was elected to the United States Senate four times, serving between March 4, 1917 and January 3, 1941. In 1918 and 1919, he served on the Overman Committee, which investigated seditious pro-German activity during World War I and Bolshevik-inspired anti-Americanism in the months following the war's end.

Though a Democrat, King was somewhat independent of the popular Democratic president Franklin Delano Roosevelt; he was re-elected in 1934 on the strength of support for Roosevelt's New Deal, but he opposed the proposal to expand the Supreme Court as well as FDR's candidacy for an unprecedented third presidential term. When he ran for re-election in 1940, he lost the Democratic nomination to Congressman Abe Murdock, a "100% New Dealer" who strongly supported Roosevelt.

He served as the President pro tempore of the Senate from 1940 to 1941 during the 76th Congress.

King remained in Washington, D.C., where he practiced law until April 1947. He returned to Utah and died there in 1949. He was buried at Salt Lake City Cemetery.

King was married twice, first to Louisa Ann "Annie" Lyman, to whom he wed in 1889, and remained with her to her death on April 16, 1906. He was then married to Vera B. Sjodahl, a daughter of Janne M. Sjödahl, from 1912 to his own death in 1949. One of his sons by Vera, David S. King, served three terms in the U.S. House of Representatives and was a United States Ambassador to both the Malagasy Republic and Mauritius. One of his granddaughters, Jody Olsen, served as Director of the Peace Corps. His paternal first cousin, Culbert Olson, also served as governor of California.

King was a direct descendant of Edmund Rice, his family's English immigrant ancestor to Massachusetts Bay Colony, as follows:

- William H. King, son of

- William King (1834–1892), son of
- Thomas Rice King (1813–1879), son of

- Thomas King (1770–1845), son of
- William King (1724–1793), son of

- Ezra Rice King (1697–1746), son of
- Samuel Rice King (1667–1713), son of
- Samuel Rice (1634–1684), son of

- Edmund Rice (1594–1663)

== See also ==
- List of United States senators from Utah

U.S. House of Representatives
Preceded by Clarence Emir Allen	Member of the U.S. House of Representatives from Utah's at-large congressional district 1897–1899	Succeeded by B. H. Roberts; Elect
Preceded by B. H. Roberts; Elect	Member of the U.S. House of Representatives from Utah's at-large congressional district 1900–1901	Succeeded by George Sutherland
Party political offices
First	Democratic nominee for U.S. Senator from Utah (Class 1); 1916, 1922, 1928, 1934	Succeeded by Abe Murdock
Preceded by Key Pittman; Acting	Secretary of the Senate Democratic Caucus; 1917–1927	Succeeded by Hugo Black
U.S. Senate
Preceded by George Sutherland	U.S. Senator (Class 1) from Utah; 1917–1941; Served alongside: Reed Smoot, Elbert D. Thomas	Succeeded by Abe Murdock
Preceded by Blair Lee	Chair of the Senate Post Office Expenditures Committee; 1917–1919	Succeeded by Henry W. Keyes
Preceded by Arthur Capper	Chair of the Senate District of Columbia Committee; 1933–1941	Succeeded by Pat McCarran
Political offices
Preceded by Key Pittman	President pro tempore of the U.S. Senate; 1940–1941	Succeeded by Pat Harrison
