= 1940 Utah gubernatorial election =

- November 5, 1940
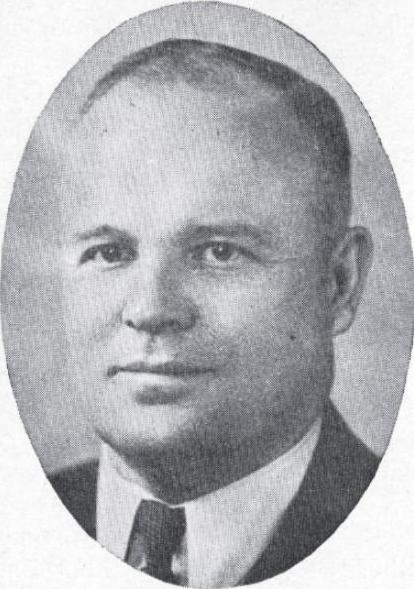

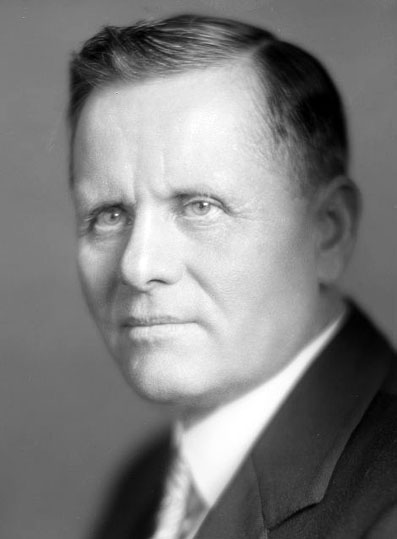
Nominee	Herbert B. Maw	Don B. Colton
Party	Democratic	Republican
Popular vote	128,519	117,713
Percentage	52.07%	47.69%
- County results Maw: 40–50% 50–60% Colton: 50–60% 60–70% 70–80%
Governor before election
Henry H. Blood
Democratic
Elected Governor
Herbert B. Maw
Democratic

The 1940 Utah gubernatorial election was held on November 5, 1940. Democratic nominee Herbert B. Maw defeated Republican nominee Don B. Colton with 52.07% of the vote.

== Primary election ==
Primary elections were held on September 3, 1940 and runoffs were held on October 1, 1940.

=== Democratic primary ===
==== Candidates ====
- Newell Haws Baum
- Ora Bundy
- Ira A. Huggins
- Herbert B. Maw, former President of the Utah Senate
- Oscar W. McConkie, LDS Church leader
- Henry D. Moyle, LDS Church leader

==== Results ====
Democratic primary results
Party	Candidate	Votes	%
Democratic	Herbert B. Maw	37,329	47.52%
Democratic	Henry D. Moyle	17,410	22.16%
Democratic	Oscar W. McConkie	10,146	12.92%
Democratic	Ira A. Huggins	7,697	9.80%
Democratic	Ora Bundy	4,955	6.31%
Democratic	Newell Haws Baum	1,016	1.29%
Total votes		78,553	100.00%

Democratic runoff results
Party	Candidate	Votes	%
Democratic	Herbert B. Maw	55,147	64.93%
Democratic	Henry D. Moyle	29,790	35.07%
Total votes		84,937	100.00%

=== Republican primary ===
==== Candidates ====
- Don B. Colton, former U.S. Representative
- Reed Stevens
- J. Bracken Lee, Mayor of Price
- William J. Lowe
- Otto A. Wiesley

==== Results ====
Republican primary results
Party	Candidate	Votes	%
Republican	Don B. Colton	15,599	36.29%
Republican	Reed Stevens	13,264	30.86%
Republican	J. Bracken Lee	9,296	21.63%
Republican	William J. Lowe	2,620	6.10%
Republican	Otto A. Wiesley	2,204	5.13%
Total votes		42,983	100.00%

Republican runoff results
Party	Candidate	Votes	%
Republican	Don B. Colton	21,983	50.92%
Republican	Reed Stevens	21,187	49.08%
Total votes		43,170	100.00%

== General election ==
=== Candidates ===
Major party candidates

- Herbert B. Maw, Democratic
- Don B. Colton, Republican

Other candidates

- Ada Williams Quinn, Independent

=== Results ===
1940 Utah gubernatorial election
Party	Candidate	Votes	%	±%
Democratic	Herbert B. Maw	128,519	52.07%	+1.12%
Republican	Don B. Colton	117,713	47.69%	+10.47%
Independent	Ada Williams Quinn	580	0.24%	
Total votes		246,812	100.00%	
Majority		10,806	4.38%	
Democratic hold		Swing	-9.35%	

=== Results by county ===
County	Herbert B. Maw Democratic		Don B. Colton Republican		Ada W. Quinn Independent		Margin		Total votes cast
County	#	%	#	%	#	%	#	%	Total votes cast
Beaver	1,099	46.22%	1,279	53.78%	0	0.00%	-180	-7.57%	2,378
Box Elder	3,821	48.35%	4,056	51.32%	26	0.33%	-235	-2.97%	7,903
Cache	5,918	44.99%	7,184	54.62%	51	0.39%	-1,266	-9.63%	13,153
Carbon	4,298	58.74%	2,970	40.59%	49	0.67%	1,328	18.15%	7,317
Daggett	144	58.06%	103	41.53%	1	0.40%	41	16.53%	248
Davis	2,882	43.27%	3,762	56.49%	16	0.24%	-880	-13.21%	6,660
Duchesne	1,600	48.75%	1,670	50.88%	12	0.37%	-70	-2.13%	3,282
Emery	1,515	52.04%	1,378	47.34%	18	0.62%	137	4.71%	2,911
Garfield	670	36.31%	1,175	63.69%	0	0.00%	-505	-27.37%	1,845
Grand	369	42.96%	487	56.69%	3	0.35%	-118	-13.74%	859
Iron	1,646	41.58%	2,307	58.27%	6	0.15%	-661	-16.70%	3,959
Juab	1,761	49.96%	1,760	49.93%	4	0.11%	1	0.03%	3,525
Kane	268	26.64%	737	73.26%	1	0.10%	-469	-46.62%	1,006
Millard	1,990	47.07%	2,234	52.84%	4	0.09%	-244	-5.77%	4,228
Morgan	548	43.42%	711	56.34%	3	0.24%	-163	-12.92%	1,262
Piute	332	37.01%	564	62.88%	1	0.11%	-232	-25.86%	897
Rich	368	40.22%	547	59.78%	0	0.00%	-179	-19.56%	915
Salt Lake	58,234	56.81%	44,140	43.06%	129	0.13%	14,094	13.75%	102,503
San Juan	413	40.41%	604	59.10%	5	0.49%	-191	-18.69%	1,022
Sanpete	3,172	43.90%	4,041	55.93%	12	0.17%	-869	-12.03%	7,225
Sevier	2,126	40.70%	3,094	59.23%	4	0.08%	-968	-18.53%	5,224
Summit	1,790	45.39%	2,140	54.26%	14	0.35%	-350	-8.87%	3,944
Tooele	2,141	52.70%	1,915	47.13%	7	0.17%	226	5.56%	4,063
Uintah	1,435	42.21%	1,941	57.09%	24	0.71%	-506	-14.88%	3,400
Utah	12,434	51.88%	11,480	47.90%	53	0.22%	954	3.98%	23,967
Wasatch	1,060	39.61%	1,614	60.31%	2	0.07%	-554	-20.70%	2,676
Washington	1,303	36.12%	2,300	63.76%	4	0.11%	-997	-27.64%	3,607
Wayne	406	46.14%	472	53.64%	2	0.23%	-66	-7.50%	880
Weber	14,776	56.93%	11,048	42.57%	129	0.50%	3,728	14.36%	25,953
Total	128,519	52.07%	117,713	47.69%	580	0.23%	10,806	4.38%	246,812

==== Counties that flipped from Democratic to Republican ====
- Beaver
- Box Elder
- Cache
- Davis
- Grand
- Iron
- Piute
- Rich
- San Juan
- Washington
- Wayne
