= K. Gunn McKay =

American politician (1925–2000)

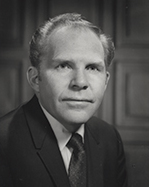

Member of the U.S. House of Representatives from Utah's 1st district
- In office January 3, 1971 – January 3, 1981
- Preceded by: Laurence J. Burton
- Succeeded by: James V. Hansen

Member of the Utah House of Representatives
- In office 1963–1971

Personal details
- Born: February 23, 1925 Ogden, Utah, U.S.
- Died: October 6, 2000 (aged 75) Huntsville, Utah, U.S.
- Party: Democratic
- Spouse: Donna Biesinger
- Children: 10
- Education: Utah State University

Military service
- Allegiance: United States of America
- Branch/service: United States Coast Guard
- Years of service: 1943–1946
- Battles/wars: World War II

Koln Gunn McKay (February 23, 1925 – October 6, 2000) was an American politician who represented the state of Utah. He served from January 3, 1971 to January 3, 1981, beginning in the ninety-second Congress and in four succeeding congresses.

== Biography ==
McKay was born in Ogden, Weber County, Utah. He was raised as a member of the Church of Jesus Christ of Latter-day Saints (LDS Church). His brother Monroe G. McKay would become a judge of the U.S. Tenth Circuit Court of Appeals in 1977, and he was a cousin of David O. McKay, the LDS Church president from 1951 to 1970.

McKay served in the U.S. Coast Guard during World War II, and was later an LDS missionary in England. Afterward, he worked as a farmer, businessman and high school history teacher. Having attended the Weber County public schools, McKay studied at Weber State College in Ogden and Utah State University in Logan, graduating in education in 1962.

McKay married Donna Biesinger in 1950 and they had ten children.

=== Politics ===
McKay began his political career in the Utah House of Representatives in 1962, completing two terms. He served on prominent house committees including the legislative council, Utah Long Range Goals and Planning Committee, and the Utah Government Reorganization Committee. McKay was appointed as administrative assistant to Utah Governor Cal Rampton, a fellow Democrat, between 1967 and 1970.

Utahns in the state's 1st District elected McKay as a Democrat to the Ninety-second Congress in 1971, and he served in four succeeding Congresses. During his political career, McKay was a strong advocate of government development in Utah. As chairman of the Military Construction Subcommittee, McKay reopened Utah’s Minuteman Missile production line, secured the F-16 fighter mission for Hill Air Force Base, Utah, and appropriated funding to increase security at Tooele, Utah’s nerve gas storage facility.

McKay also worked to ensure protection for Utah’s natural resources, securing funding that further developed Capitol Reef National Park, Glen Canyon, Arches, and Zion National Parks. He also drafted legislation on Utah’s Lone Peak Wilderness Area and on the Clean Air Act.

However, as the Republican party made significant advances in western politics during the Ronald Reagan landslide, McKay lost in his bid for a 6th term to Republican James V. Hansen in 1980. He ran twice to reclaim the seat in 1986 and 1988, but he was defeated both times.

=== Church service ===
An active leader in the LDS Church, McKay served as president of the Ogden Stake, between 1967 and 1970. He also served as president of the Edinburgh Scotland Mission of the LDS Church between 1981 and 1984. He and his wife later served a two-year mission to Kenya and another two-year mission to Malaysia. While in Pakistan on yet another mission, McKay returned home early due to illness.

=== Death ===
McKay died in Huntsville, Utah at the age of 75, from complications of mesothelioma.

== See also ==
- Quinn G. McKay: brother

== Notes ==
U.S. House of Representatives
Preceded by Laurence J. Burton	Member of the U.S. House of Representatives from Utah's 1st congressional district 1971–1981	Succeeded by James V. Hansen
