= Walter K. Granger =

American politician (1888–1978)

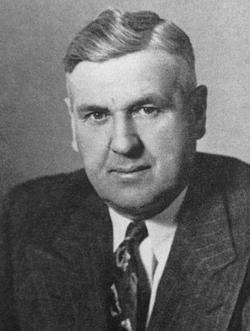

Member of the U.S. House of Representatives from Utah's 1st district
- In office January 3, 1941 – January 3, 1953
- Preceded by: Abe Murdock
- Succeeded by: Douglas R. Stringfellow

Member of the Utah House of Representatives
- In office 1932-1937

Mayor of Cedar City
- In office 1930-1932
- In office 1923-1926

Personal details
- Born: Walter Keil Granger; October 11, 1888 St. George, Utah Territory
- Died: April 21, 1978 (aged 89) Cedar City, Utah, U.S.
- Resting place: Cedar City Cemetery
- Party: Democratic
- Education: Branch Agricultural College

Military service
- Allegiance: United States of America
- Branch/service: Marine Corps
- Years of service: 1918–1919
- Rank: Sergeant
- Unit: Eleventh Regiment
- Battles/wars: World War I

Walter Keil Granger (October 11, 1888 – April 21, 1978) was an American politician who served six terms as a U.S. representative from Utah from 1941 to 1953.

== Biography ==
Born in St. George in the Utah Territory, Granger moved with his parents to Cedar City, in 1894. He attended the public schools and graduated from Branch Agricultural College at Cedar City, Utah in 1909. From 1909 to 1911 Granger served as an LDS missionary in the Southern States Mission.

=== Early career ===
Granger served as postmaster of Cedar City from 1914 to 1922. During this time he served overseas as a sergeant in the Eleventh Regiment of the United States Marine Corps from 1918 to 1919, which saw no combat in the waning days of World War I. He later twice served as mayor of Cedar City from 1923 to 1926 and 1930 to 1932. From 1926 until at least 1930 Granger was also the LDS Bishop of the Cedar 3rd Ward in Cedar City.

=== Early political career ===
Advancing his political career, Granger served as member of the Utah House of Representatives from 1932 to 1937, and serving as speaker in 1935. He then served as member of the Public Service Commission of Utah from 1937 to 1940.

=== Congress ===
In 1941 Granger was elected as a Democrat to the Seventy-seventh and to the five succeeding Congresses (January 3, 1941 to January 3, 1953). He was not a candidate for reelection in 1952 but was an unsuccessful candidate for election to the United States Senate. In 1954 he was again an unsuccessful candidate, in the election to the 84th United States Congress.

=== Later career and death ===
Granger was engaged in agricultural pursuits and livestock raising and served as member of the board of trustees of Utah State Agricultural College.

After his political life he resumed his farming interests and from 1967 to 1970 served as member of the Board of Appeals of the United States Forest Service in the Department of Agriculture.

After retiring, he resided again in Cedar City, where he died April 21, 1978, at the age of 89. He was interred in Cedar City Cemetery.

== Electoral history ==
1940 United States House of Representatives elections
Party	Candidate	Votes	%
Democratic	Walter K. Granger	62,654	57.13
Republican	LeRoy B. Young	47,021	42.87
Total votes		109,675	100.0
Democratic hold			

1942 United States House of Representatives elections
Party	Candidate	Votes	%
Democratic	Walter K. Granger (Incumbent)	36,297	50.19
Republican	J. Bracken Lee	36,028	49.81
Total votes		72,325	100.0
Democratic hold			

1944 United States House of Representatives elections
Party	Candidate	Votes	%
Democratic	Walter K. Granger (Incumbent)	59,755	57.79
Republican	B. H. Stringham	43,642	42.21
Total votes		103,397	100.0
Democratic hold			

1946 United States House of Representatives elections
Party	Candidate	Votes	%
Democratic	Walter K. Granger (Incumbent)	44,888	50.06
Republican	David J. Wilson	44,784	49.94
Total votes		89,672	100.0
Democratic hold			

1948 United States House of Representatives elections
Party	Candidate	Votes	%
Democratic	Walter K. Granger (Incumbent)	66,641	59.04
Republican	David J. Wilson	46,229	40.96
Total votes		112,870	100.0
Democratic hold			

1950 United States House of Representatives elections
Party	Candidate	Votes	%
Democratic	Walter K. Granger (Incumbent)	54,161	51.08
Republican	Preston L. Jones	51,868	48.92
Total votes		106,029	100.0
Democratic hold			

1952 United States House of Representatives elections
Party	Candidate	Votes	%
Republican	Douglas R. Stringfellow	76,545	60.54
Democratic	Ernest R. McKay	49,898	39.46
Total votes		126,443	100.0
Republican gain from Democratic			

1954 United States House of Representatives elections
Party	Candidate	Votes	%
Republican	Henry Aldous Dixon	55,542	53.37
Democratic	Walter K. Granger	48,535	46.63
Total votes		104,077	100.0
Republican hold			

== Sources ==
- United States Congress. "Walter K. Granger (id: G000379)". Biographical Directory of the United States Congress.

Party political offices
Preceded by Orrice Abram Murdock Jr.	Democratic nominee for U.S. Senator from Utah (Class 1); 1952	Succeeded by Frank Moss
U.S. House of Representatives
Preceded by Abe Murdock	Member of the U.S. House of Representatives from Utah's 1st congressional district 1941–1953	Succeeded by Douglas R. Stringfellow
