= Laurence J. Burton =

American politician

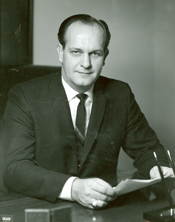

Member of the U.S. House of Representatives from Utah's 1st district
- In office January 3, 1963 – January 3, 1971
- Preceded by: M. Blaine Peterson
- Succeeded by: K. Gunn McKay

Personal details
- Born: October 30, 1926 Ogden, Utah, U.S.
- Died: November 27, 2002 (aged 76) Ogden, Utah, U.S.
- Party: Republican
- Spouse: Janice Louise Shupe
- Children: 4
- Education: Weber College; University of Utah; Utah State University
- Occupation: Public relations

Military service
- Allegiance: United States of America
- Branch/service: United States Navy
- Years of service: 1945–46
- Unit: United States Navy Air Corps
- Battles/wars: World War II

Laurence Junior Burton (October 30, 1926 – November 27, 2002) was a U.S. representative from Utah.

Born in Ogden, Utah, Burton graduated from Ogden High School in 1944. Enlisted in the United States Navy Air Corps and served from January 1945 to July 1946. He graduated from Weber College at Ogden, in 1948, from the University of Utah in 1951, and from Utah State University at Logan in 1956. Took postgraduate work at Georgetown and George Washington University, Washington, D.C., in 1957 and 1958. Public relations director and athletic manager at Weber College from 1948 to 1956. Regional director for American College Public Relations Association in 1954 and 1955. He was editor of National Junior College Athletic Association magazine from 1951 to 1961. Legislative assistant to U.S. Representative Henry Aldous Dixon in 1957 and 1958. He served as assistant professor of political science at Weber College from 1958 to 1960. Administrative assistant to Utah Governor George Dewey Clyde from 1960 to 1962. He served as delegate, Republican National Convention, 1968.

Burton was elected as a Republican to the Eighty-eighth and to the three succeeding Congresses (January 3, 1963 – January 3, 1971). He was not a candidate for reelection in 1970, but was an [1970 United States Senate election in Utah|unsuccessful nominee in 1970] to the United States Senate. As of 2023 he is the most recent Republican nominee to lose a Senate Election in Utah. He died aged 76 on November 27, 2002, in Ogden.

Burton was a member of the Church of Jesus Christ of Latter-day Saints.

== Sources ==
- United States Congress. "Laurence J. Burton (id: B001155)". Biographical Directory of the United States Congress.
- Political Graveyard

Party political offices
Preceded by Ernest L. Wilkinson	Republican nominee for U.S. Senator from Utah (Class 1); 1970	Succeeded by Orrin Hatch
U.S. House of Representatives
Preceded by M. Blaine Peterson	Member of the U.S. House of Representatives from Utah's 1st congressional district 1963–1971	Succeeded by K. Gunn McKay
