= Douglas Stringfellow =

US soldier, politician, and military impostor (1922–1966)

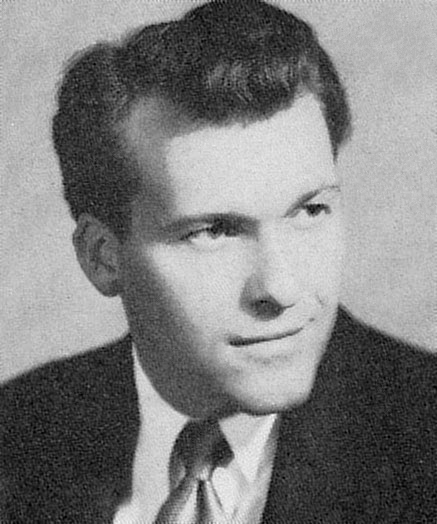
- Official portrait, 1953
- Born: 24 September 1922; Draper, Utah, US
- Died: 19 October 1966 (aged 44); Long Beach, California, US
- Resting place: Ogden, Utah, US
- Education: Weber College; Ohio State University; University of Cincinnati
- Occupations: Radio announcer; public speaker; politician; landscapist
- Political party: Republican
- Spouse: Shirley Mae Lemmon (m. 1946)
- Children: 4
- Military career
- Branch: United States Army
- Years: 1942–1945 (3.01 years)
- Rank: Private first class
- Service number: 19 152 974
- Conflicts: World War II

Member of the U.S. House of Representatives from Utah's 1st district
- In office January 3, 1953 – January 3, 1955
- Preceded by: Walter K. Granger
- Succeeded by: Henry Aldous Dixon

Douglas R. Stringfellow (24 September 1922 – 19 October 1966) was an American soldier, politician, and military impostor.

Accidentally injured in World War II, Stringfellow began lying about his service, which he parlayed into being elected a representative from Utah in the 83rd United States Congress. His falsehoods were uncovered during his campaign for a second term, after which he confessed and withdrew from the race.

== Personal life ==
Douglas R. Stringfellow was born on 24 September 1922 in Draper, Utah, to Henry Elden Stringfellow (1889/1890 – 1954).

He received a public education and graduated from high school in 1941. Stringfellow attended Weber College in the 1941–1942 academic year, Ohio State University in 1943, and the University of Cincinnati from 1943 to 1944.

When Stringfellow met his wife, Shirley Mae Lemmon (born 1926/1927), in early 1945, she was a dancer with the United Service Organizations. They were married on 11 June 1946 in Salt Lake, Utah, at Salt Lake Temple; they moved to San Clemente, California in May 1966. Stringfellow had four children and was a lifelong member of The Church of Jesus Christ of Latter-day Saints.

== Military service ==
Stringfellow enlisted in the United States Army on 4 November 1942 in Ogden, Utah. He was an infantryman. His first overseas deployment was to southern France in December 1944 for demining. Within two weeks he took accidental shrapnel to the spine from an S-mine, becoming paraplegic and earning a Purple Heart. He was transferred back to Utah from France in January 1945.

He formally separated from the military on 8 November 1945 as a private first class at Brigham City, Utah. Afterward, he worked as a radio announcer in Ogden, Utah.

=== Stolen valor ===
After his separation, Stringfellow began speaking to Mormon gatherings and civic groups in the Salt Lake City metropolitan area. He lied extensively about his service, claiming that he had been assigned to the Office of Strategic Services and sent on a top-secret mission to capture Nazi nuclear physicist Otto Hahn along with 29 other soldiers. He claimed that all the other men were killed, and that he was captured and tortured at Bergen-Belsen concentration camp. He variously explained his paraplegia as either a result of that torture, or from a land mine after his escape to France.

Stringfellow's story secured him many speaking engagements across the country, including on Suspense and This Is Your Life. It also garnered him "a mantelful of awards from civic and veterans' organizations", including the Junior Chamber of Commerce naming him in the top ten outstanding young men in the United States. The Evergreen Freedom Foundation ranked his public speaking behind only presidents Herbert Hoover and Dwight D. Eisenhower. Multiple film studios bid for the rights to adapt his story, with Hall Bartlett winning in the week of 10 October 1954.

== US Congress ==
In 1952, he announced his candidacy for United States representative from Utah, capitalizing extensively on the lies about his military service. He easily won as a Republican, defeating Ernest R. McKay in the election.

1952, general, United States Representative from Utah, 1st District
Party	Candidate	Votes	%
Republican	Douglas Stringfellow	76,545	60.54
Democratic	Ernest R. McKay	49,898	39.46

=== Service ===
Stringfellow served in the 83rd United States Congress from 1953 to 1954. He liaised with the United States Atomic Energy Commission (AEC) after reports that Upshot-Knothole Harry, a nuclear weapons test, had sickened miners in St. George, Utah; Stringfellow later requested the AEC postpone or relocate planned Operation Teapot tests after his southern Utah constituents feared for their livestock. He supported construction of the Echo Park Dam. Despite being in support of agricultural price controls, he supported efforts by the United States Secretary of Agriculture, Ezra Taft Benson, to lower such supports.

=== Exposé ===
In the next election cycle, Stringfellow looked like an easy winner for reelection against Walter K. Granger.

When reporters began investigating the persistent rumors about Stringfellow's story, they were stonewalled by the Department of Defense over its "fear of offending a congressman." In an article titled "The Strange Case of Congressman Doug Stringfellow", citing hard evidence, and published two weeks before the November election, Harold G. Stagg of the Army Times reported how Stringfellow's story did not withstand scrutiny—later adding that White House staff had known this for six months. Representative Stringfellow called it political persecution, threatened a libel lawsuit, and called upon President Eisenhower to release secret allegedly-exonerative Central Intelligence Agency files.

When Stringfellow was summoned before both US senators from Utah (Wallace F. Bennett and Arthur V. Watkins), he admitted his lies before going on KSL-TV—accompanied by his wife and Watkins—and doing the same:

Somewhere along the line, the idea ... was integrated in introductions that Doug Stringfellow was a war hero ... Like many other persons suddenly thrust into the limelight, I rather thrived on the adulation and new-found popularity ... I began to embellish my speeches with more picturesque and fanciful incidents. I fell into a trap, which in part had been laid by my own glib tongue. [...] I was never an OSS agent. I never participated in any secret, behind-the-lines mission ... I never captured Otto Hahn or any other German physicist

The chairman of the Utah Republican Party reported that "reaction to Stringfellow's disclosure at state party headquarters was 'tremendous,' and that a 'large volume' of the telephone calls and telegrams indicated the callers would still vote for the congressman." Stringfellow did not resign from office. He dropped out of the race and was replaced on the ballot by Henry Aldous Dixon, who won the election.

== Later life, death, and legacy ==
After his single term in office, Stringfellow became a public speaker. He later worked as a landscape painter in California, Mexico, and Utah. The Washington Post reported that Stringfellow did not return the awards he had received while telling his false OSS story; he said he "felt these were given me for my present abilities and activities".

Stringfellow's gravemarker

From 26 October – 9 November 1965, while living in San Miguel de Allende, Stringfellow suffered three heart attacks. Doctors determined the cause to be a blood clot in his lungs, caused by poor circulation in his paralyzed legs. He later died of another heart attack at age 44, on 19 October 1966, in Long Beach, California. He was interred at Memorial Gardens of the Wasatch in Ogden, Utah.

Stringfellow wrote a 385-page autobiography, for which he received a US$20,000 advance from Random House, but he returned the company's money when he declined to publish. In it, he wrote that he only realized his own stories were fabrications once others began to question them. He had confessed to intentionally lying because he preferred to be considered a liar rather than admit his self-delusion and be thought crazy. University of Warwick professor of psychology, Kimberly Wade, said that her research supported the possibility of Stringfellow having false memories; Roger K. Pitman, professor of psychiatry at Harvard Medical School, said that such cases were extremely rare but possible, "it may have been part of his post-traumatic [stress disorder] psychopathology."

== See also ==
- Dan Johnson (Kentucky politician) – American religious leader and legislator (1960–2017)
- List of federal political scandals in the United States
- George Santos – American politician and convicted felon (born 1988)
