= Edward U. Knowlton =

American politician (1933–2016)

Edward Ute Knowlton (June 24, 1933 – December 1, 2016) was an American physician and politician.

Born in Ogden, Utah, Knowlton graduated from the University of Utah School of Medicine and then practiced medicine in Kaysville, Utah. He served in the United States Army during the Vietnam War and retired as a lieutenant colonel in 1969. From 1981 until 1987, Knowlton served in the Utah House of Representatives and was a Republican. Knowlton died in Kaysville, Utah from Lou Gehrig's Disease.
