= 1970 United States Senate election in Utah =

- November 3, 1970
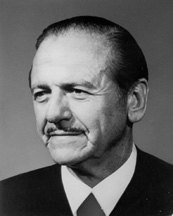

Nominee	Frank Moss	Laurence J. Burton
Party	Democratic	Republican
Popular vote	210,207	159,004
Percentage	56.16%	42.48%
- County results Moss: 50–60% 60–70% 70–80% Burton: 40–50% 50–60% 60–70%
U.S. senator before election
Frank Moss
Democratic
Elected U.S. Senator
Frank Moss
Democratic

The 1970 United States Senate election in Utah was held on November 3, 1970. Incumbent Democratic Senator Frank Moss was re-elected to a third term in office, defeating Republican U.S. Representative Laurence J. Burton.

As of the 2024 Senate election, this is the last time a Democrat won a U.S. Senate election in Utah, matching Wyoming for the longest Senate Republican winning streak.

== General election ==
=== Candidates ===
- Laurence J. Burton, U.S. Representative from Ogden (Republican)
- Clyde B. Freeman (American Independent)
- Frank Moss, incumbent Senator since 1959 (Democratic)

=== Results ===
1970 U.S. Senate election in Utah
Party	Candidate	Votes	%	±%
Democratic	Frank Moss (incumbent)	210,207	56.16%	▼1.17
Republican	Laurence J. Burton	159,004	42.48%	▼0.19
American Independent	Clyde B. Freeman	5,092	1.36%	N/A
Total votes		374,303	100.00%	N/A
Democratic hold				

== See also ==
- 1970 United States Senate elections
