= Fielding, Utah =

- Town
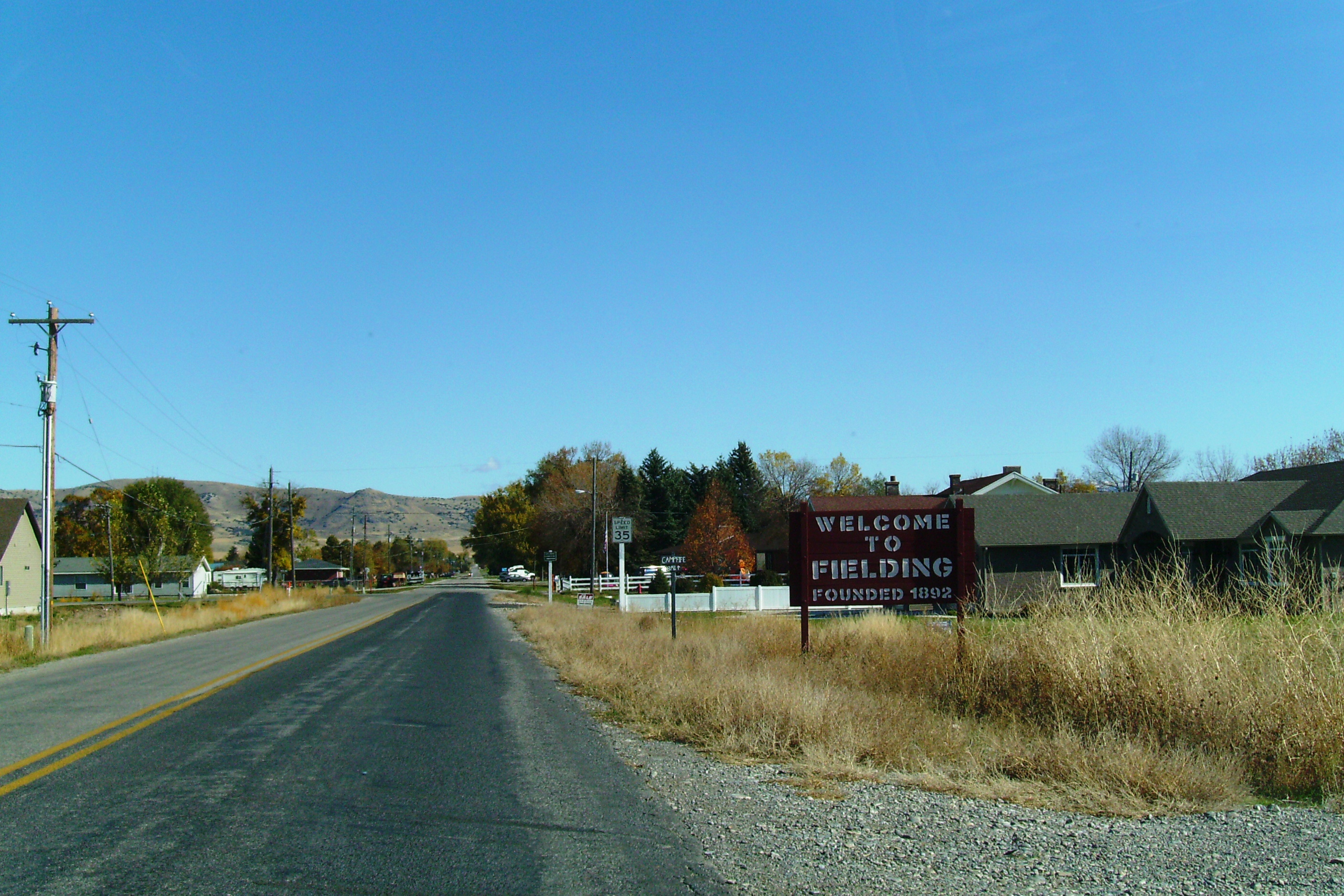
- Welcome sign

- Location in Box Elder County and the State of Utah.

- Location of Utah in the United States
- Coordinates: 41°48′47″N 112°07′18″W
- Country: United States
- State: Utah
- County: Box Elder
- Founded: 1892
- Incorporated: 1911
- Named for: Joseph Fielding Smith

Area
  - Total: 0.51 sq mi (1.32 km^{2})
  - Land: 0.51 sq mi (1.32 km^{2})
  - Water: 0 sq mi (0.00 km^{2})
- Elevation: 4,370 ft (1,330 m)

Population (2020)
  - Total: 546
  - Density: 944.4/sq mi (364.65/km^{2})
- Time zone: UTC-7 (Mountain (MST))
  - Summer (DST): UTC-6 (MDT)
- ZIP code: 84311
- Area code: 435
- FIPS code: 49-25290
- GNIS feature ID: 2412625
- Website: www.fieldingtown.org

Fielding is a town in Box Elder County, Utah, United States. The population was 546 at the 2020 census.

== History ==
A post office called Fielding has been in operation since 1892. The town was named after Joseph Fielding Smith Sr. (1838–1918), sixth president of the LDS Church, specifically his mother's (Mary Fielding Smith's) maiden name. Prior to being named Fielding the area was known as Plymouth.

== Geography ==
According to the United States Census Bureau, the town has a total area of 0.4 square mile (1.1 km^{2}), all land.

== Demographics ==
Historical population
Census	Pop.	Note	%±
1910	485		—
1920	374		−22.9%
1930	333		−11.0%
1940	324		−2.7%
1950	249		−23.1%
1960	270		8.4%
1970	254		−5.9%
1980	325		28.0%
1990	422		29.8%
2000	448		6.2%
2010	455		1.6%
2020	546		20.0%
US Decennial Census

As of the 2000 United States census, there were 448 people, 139 households, and 119 families in the town. The population density was 1,014.3 people per square mile (393.1/km^{2}). There were 142 housing units at an average density of 321.5 per square mile (124.6/km^{2}). The racial makeup of the town was 97.77% White, 0.45% Native American, 0.67% from other races, and 1.12% from two or more races. Hispanic or Latino of any race were 2.23% of the population.

There were 139 households, out of which 50.4% had children under 18 living with them, 79.9% were married couples living together, 5.8% had a female householder with no husband present, and 13.7% were non-families. 12.2% of all households were made up of individuals, and 5.8% had someone living alone who was 65 years or older. The average household size was 3.22, and the average family size was 3.48.

The town population contained 36.4% under 18, 10.9% from 18 to 24, 24.1% from 25 to 44, 19.4% from 45 to 64, and 9.2% who were 65 years of age or older. The median age was 27 years. For every 100 females, there were 100.0 males. For every 100 females aged 18 and over, there were 102.1 males.

The median income for a household in the town was $44,000, and the median income for a family was $46,563. Males had a median income of $37,885 versus $22,708 for females. The per capita income for the town was $14,222. None of the families and 0.9% of the population were living below the poverty line, including no under eighteens and none of those over 64.

== See also ==
- List of cities and towns in Utah
