= Henry Aldous Dixon =

American politician

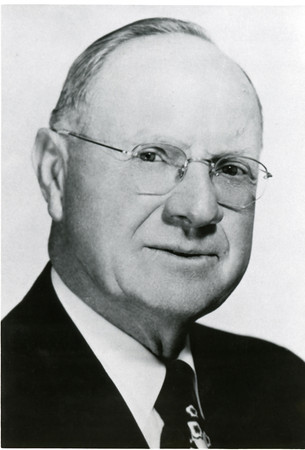

Member of the U.S. House of Representatives from Utah's 1st district
- In office January 3, 1955 – January 3, 1961
- Preceded by: Douglas R. Stringfellow
- Succeeded by: M. Blaine Peterson

Personal details
- Born: Henry Aldous Dixon; June 29, 1890 Provo, Utah Territory
- Died: January 22, 1967 (aged 76) Ogden, Utah, U.S.
- Resting place: Washington Heights Memorial Park
- Party: Republican
- Education: Brigham Young University; University of Chicago; University of Southern California
- Occupation: College President

Henry Aldous Dixon (June 29, 1890 – January 22, 1967) was an American businessman and academic administrator who served three terms as a U.S. representative from Utah from 1955 to 1961.

He was also the president of first Weber College and later Utah State Agricultural College.

== Biography ==
Born in Provo in the Utah Territory, Dixon attended the public schools until high school, when he attended private Brigham Young High School, from which he graduated in 1909. He graduated from Brigham Young University, Provo, Utah, in 1914, from the University of Chicago in 1917, and from the University of Southern California in 1937.

=== Academic career ===
Dixon was an instructor at Weber College, which later became Weber State University, from 1914 to 1918, and served as the college's president twice, in 1919–1920 and 1937–1953. Between these presidential terms, he served as superintendent of Provo city schools from 1920 to 1924 and again in 1932–1937. Between these two terms as superintendent, from 1924 to 1932, Dixon was managing vice president of Farmers and Merchants Bank. During his second term as president of Weber College, he was a member of the President's Commission on Higher Education (1946–1948), a member of the board of directors of Salt Lake Branch of the Federal Reserve Bank of San Francisco (1945–1951), and director of the Association of Junior Colleges (1950–1954).

After heading Weber College, he became president of Utah State Agricultural College (which later became Utah State University) at Logan, Utah from August 1953 to December 1954.

=== Congress ===
In 1954, Republican 1st District Congressman Douglas R. Stringfellow was forced to retire from Congress after only one term after it emerged he had lied about both his service record in World War II and his educational history. Dixon was asked to replace Stringfellow on the ballot only 16 days before the election and won. He served in the Eighty-fourth, Eighty-fifth, and Eighty-sixth Congresses (January 3, 1955 – January 3, 1961). He did not seek renomination in 1960.

Dixon voted in favor of the Civil Rights Acts of 1957 and 1960.

=== Later activities ===
Dixon taught at Brigham Young University, his alma mater, until 1965.

=== Death and burial ===
He died in Ogden, Utah, January 22, 1967 and was interred in Washington Heights Memorial Park.

== Election history ==
1954 United States House of Representatives elections
Party	Candidate	Votes	%
Republican	Henry Aldous Dixon	55,542	53.37
Democratic	Walter K. Granger	48,535	46.63
Total votes		104,077	100.0
Republican hold			

1956 United States House of Representatives elections
Party	Candidate	Votes	%
Republican	Henry Aldous Dixon (Incumbent)	74,107	60.92
Democratic	Carlyle F. Gronning	47,533	39.08
Total votes		121,640	100.0
Republican hold			

1958 United States House of Representatives elections
Party	Candidate	Votes	%
Republican	Henry Aldous Dixon (Incumbent)	58,141	53.90
Democratic	M. Blaine Peterson	49,735	46.10
Total votes		107,876	100.0
Republican hold			

== Sources ==
- United States Congress. "Henry Aldous Dixon (id: D000368)". Biographical Directory of the United States Congress.

Academic offices
Preceded by Owen F. Beal	President of Weber Normal College; 1919–1920	Succeeded by Joel E. Ricks
Preceded by Leland W. Creer	President of Weber College; 1937–1953	Succeeded by William P. Miller
Preceded by Louis Linden Madsen	President of Utah State Agricultural College; 1953–1954	Succeeded by Daryl Chase
U.S. House of Representatives
Preceded by Douglas R. Stringfellow	Member of the U.S. House of Representatives from Utah's 1st congressional district 1955–1961	Succeeded by M. Blaine Peterson
