= 2024 Utah State Treasurer election =

- November 5, 2024
Nominee	Marlo Oaks	Neil Hansen	Miles Pomeroy
Party	Republican	Democratic	Forward
Popular vote	920,760	420,883	76,212
Percentage	64.94%	29.68%	5.38%
- Oaks: 40–50% 50–60% 60–70% 70–80% 80–90% >90% Hansen: 40–50%
State Treasurer before election
Marlo Oaks
Republican
Elected State Treasurer
Marlo Oaks
Republican

The 2024 Utah State Treasurer election took place on November 5, 2024, to elect the next state treasurer of Utah. Incumbent Republican treasurer Marlo Oaks won a special election after David Damschen resigned, and was re-elected.

== Republican primary ==
=== Candidates ===
==== Nominee ====
- Marlo Oaks, incumbent state treasurer (2021–present)

== Democratic primary ==
=== Candidates ===
==== Nominee ====
- Neil Hansen, former state representative (1999–2011), nominee for state treasurer in 2016, and candidate for governor in 2020

== Forward convention ==
=== Candidates ===
==== Nominee ====
- Miles Pomeroy, software engineer and co-leader of the Utah Forward Party

== General election ==
=== Results ===
2024 Utah State Treasurer election
Party	Candidate	Votes	%
Republican	Marlo Oaks (incumbent)	920,760	64.94%
Democratic	Neil Hansen	420,883	29.68%
Forward	Miles Pomeroy	76,212	5.38%
Total votes		1,417,855	100.00%
Republican hold			

==== By county ====
County	Marlo Oaks Republican		Neil Hansen Democratic		Miles Pomeroy Forward		Margin		Total
County	#	%	#	%	#	%	#	%	Total
Beaver	2,644	86.60%	335	10.97%	74	2.42%	2,309	75.63%	3,053
Box Elder	22,908	81.35%	4,020	14.28%	1,233	4.38%	18,888	67.07%	28,161
Cache	41,373	72.38%	12,733	22.28%	3,054	5.34%	28,640	50.10%	57,160
Carbon	6,402	70.18%	2,374	26.02%	346	3.79%	4,028	44.16%	9,122
Daggett	419	81.36%	81	15.73%	15	2.91%	338	65.63%	515
Davis	106,700	66.99%	39,407	24.74%	13,177	8.27%	67,293	42.25%	159,284
Duchesne	7,660	87.71%	808	9.25%	265	3.03%	6,852	78.46%	8,733
Emery	4,157	85.48%	582	11.97%	124	2.55%	3,575	73.51%	4,863
Garfield	2,160	80.39%	446	16.60%	81	3.01%	1,714	63.79%	2,687
Grand	2,364	46.62%	2,506	49.42%	201	3.96%	-142	-2.80%	5,071
Iron	21,377	80.35%	4,227	15.89%	1,002	3.77%	17,150	64.46%	26,606
Juab	5,315	87.06%	601	9.84%	189	3.10%	4,714	77.22%	6,105
Kane	3,186	75.52%	908	21.52%	125	2.96%	2,278	53.99%	4,219
Millard	5,341	86.93%	624	10.16%	179	2.91%	4,717	76.77%	6,144
Morgan	5,452	82.66%	903	13.69%	241	3.65%	4,549	68.97%	6,596
Piute	837	90.19%	76	8.19%	15	1.62%	761	82.00%	928
Rich	1,168	84.95%	170	12.36%	37	2.69%	998	72.58%	1,375
Salt Lake	241,260	49.93%	216,646	44.84%	25,284	5.23%	24,614	5.09%	483,190
San Juan	3,550	58.56%	2,308	38.07%	204	3.37%	1,242	20.49%	6,062
Sanpete	10,534	84.38%	1,470	11.78%	480	3.84%	9,064	72.60%	12,484
Sevier	9,311	88.62%	921	8.77%	275	2.62%	8,390	79.85%	10,507
Summit	11,801	48.65%	11,588	47.77%	869	3.58%	213	0.88%	24,258
Tooele	22,953	71.57%	7,403	23.08%	1,715	5.35%	15,550	48.49%	32,071
Uintah	13,274	86.68%	1,551	10.13%	489	3.19%	11,723	76.55%	15,314
Utah	215,313	75.53%	52,970	18.58%	16,772	5.88%	162,343	56.95%	285,055
Wasatch	12,135	68.84%	4,808	27.27%	685	3.89%	7,327	41.56%	17,628
Washington	72,854	78.29%	17,162	18.44%	3,037	3.26%	55,692	59.85%	93,053
Wayne	1,226	77.50%	305	19.28%	51	3.22%	921	58.22%	1,582
Weber	67,086	63.27%	32,950	31.08%	5,993	5.65%	34,136	32.19%	106,029
Totals	920,760	64.94%	420,883	29.68%	76,212	5.38%	499,877	35.26%	1,417,855

Counties that flipped from Republican to Democratic

- Grand (largest municipality: Moab)

==== By congressional district ====
Oaks won all four congressional districts.

District	Oaks	Hansen	Pomeroy	Representative
1st	63%	30%	6%	Blake Moore
2nd	63%	32%	5%	Celeste Maloy
3rd	66%	29%	5%	John Curtis (118th Congress)
3rd	66%	29%	5%	Mike Kennedy (119th Congress)
4th	68%	27%	5%	Burgess Owens

== See also ==
- 2024 Utah elections
