= Utah's 2nd congressional district =

U.S. House district for Utah

Coordinates: 38°N 110°W

- Interactive map of district boundaries
- Representative: Celeste Maloy; R–Cedar City
- Population (2025): 895,252
- Median household income: $88,699
- Ethnicity: 70.8% White; 18.7% Hispanic; 3.4% Two or more races; 2.6% Asian; 1.8% Pacific Islander Americans; 1.5% Black; 0.9% Native American; 0.4% other
- Cook PVI: R+10

Utah's 2nd congressional district currently serves western Salt Lake City and the largely rural western and southern portions of Utah, including Saint George and Tooele. The district is currently represented by Republican Celeste Maloy, who was elected to the seat after she defeated Democrat Kathleen Riebe in the November 21, 2023 special election, caused by the resignation of incumbent Chris Stewart (R) on September 15, 2023.

== Recent election results from statewide races ==
=== 2023–2027 boundaries ===
Year	Office	Results
2008	President	McCain 60–37%
2012	President	Romney 71–29%
2016	President	Trump 47–31%
2016	Senate	Lee 64–30%
2016	Governor	Herbert 63–32%
2016	Attorney General	Reyes 62–28%
2016	Treasurer	Damschen 58–35%
2016	Auditor	Dougall 60–34%
2018	Senate	Romney 58–35%
2020	President	Trump 57–40%
2020	Governor	Cox 58–33%
2020	Attorney General	Reyes 58–36%
2022	Senate	Lee 53–42%
2024	President	Trump 59–39%
2024	Senate	Curtis 60–34%
2024	Governor	Cox 51–31%
2024	Attorney General	Brown 56–30%
2024	Treasurer	Oaks 63–32%
2024	Auditor	Cannon 62–33%

=== 2027–2033 boundaries ===
Year	Office	Results
2008	President	McCain 68–28%
2012	President	Romney 80–20%
2016	President	Trump 47–22%
2016	Senate	Lee 73–22%
2016	Governor	Herbert 72–23%
2016	Attorney General	Reyes 70–20%
2016	Treasurer	Damschen 65–28%
2016	Auditor	Dougall 67–26%
2018	Senate	Romney 68–25%
2020	President	Trump 63–33%
2020	Governor	Cox 69–25%
2020	Attorney General	Reyes 65–29%
2022	Senate	Lee 56–40%
2024	President	Trump 63–34%
2024	Senate	Curtis 66–27%
2024	Governor	Cox 57–24%
2024	Attorney General	Brown 61–24%
2024	Treasurer	Oaks 68–25%
2024	Auditor	Cannon 67–27%

== List of members representing the district ==
District borders are periodically redrawn and some district residences may no longer be in the current 2nd district.

Until 1913, Utah only elected from the former at-large district.

Member	Party	Years	Cong ress	Electoral history	Location
District established March 4, 1913
Jacob Johnson (Spring City)	Republican	March 4, 1913 – March 3, 1915	63rd	Elected in 1912. Lost renomination.	
James Henry Mays (Salt Lake City)	Democratic	March 4, 1915 – March 3, 1921	64th 65th 66th	Elected in 1914. Re-elected in 1916. Re-elected in 1918. Retired.	
Elmer O. Leatherwood (Salt Lake City)	Republican	March 4, 1921 – December 24, 1929	67th 68th 69th 70th 71st	Elected in 1920. Re-elected in 1922. Re-elected in 1924. Re-elected in 1926. Re-elected in 1928. Died.	
Vacant		December 24, 1929 – November 4, 1930	71st		
Frederick C. Loofbourow (Salt Lake City)	Republican	November 4, 1930 – March 3, 1933	71st 72nd	Elected to finish Leatherwood's term. Elected the same day to the next term. Lost re-election.	
J. W. Robinson (Provo)	Democratic	March 4, 1933 – January 3, 1947	73rd 74th 75th 76th 77th 78th 79th	Elected in 1932. Re-elected in 1934. Re-elected in 1936. Re-elected in 1938. Re-elected in 1940. Re-elected in 1944. Lost re-election.	
William A. Dawson (Layton)	Republican	January 3, 1947 – January 3, 1949	80th	Elected in 1946. Lost re-election.	
Reva Beck Bosone (Salt Lake City)	Democratic	January 3, 1949 – January 3, 1953	81st 82nd	Elected in 1948. Re-elected in 1950. Lost re-election.	
William A. Dawson (Salt Lake City)	Republican	January 3, 1953 – January 3, 1959	83rd 84th 85th	Elected in 1952. Re-elected in 1954. Re-elected in 1956. Lost re-election.	
David S. King (Salt Lake City)	Democratic	January 3, 1959 – January 3, 1963	86th 87th	Elected in 1958. Re-elected in 1960. Retired to run for U.S. Senator.	
Sherman P. Lloyd (Salt Lake City)	Republican	January 3, 1963 – January 3, 1965	88th	Elected in 1962. Retired to run for U.S. Senator.	
David S. King (Salt Lake City)	Democratic	January 3, 1965 – January 3, 1967	89th	Elected in 1964. Lost re-election.	
Sherman P. Lloyd (Salt Lake City)	Republican	January 3, 1967 – January 3, 1973	90th 91st 92nd	Elected in 1966. Re-elected in 1968. Re-elected in 1970. Lost re-election.	
Wayne Owens (Salt Lake City)	Democratic	January 3, 1973 – January 3, 1975	93rd	Elected in 1972. Retired to run for U.S. Senator.	
Allan Turner Howe (Salt Lake City)	Democratic	January 3, 1975 – January 3, 1977	94th	Elected in 1974. Lost re-election.	
David Daniel Marriott (Salt Lake City)	Republican	January 3, 1977 – January 3, 1985	95th 96th 97th 98th	Elected in 1976. Re-elected in 1978. Re-elected in 1980. Re-elected in 1982. Retired to run for Governor of Utah.	
David Smith Monson (Salt Lake City)	Republican	January 3, 1985 – January 3, 1987	99th	Elected in 1984. Retired.	
Wayne Owens (Salt Lake City)	Democratic	January 3, 1987 – January 3, 1993	100th 101st 102nd	Re-elected in 1986. Re-elected in 1988. Re-elected in 1990. Retired to run for U.S. Senator.	
Karen Shepherd (Salt Lake City)	Democratic	January 3, 1993 – January 3, 1995	103rd	Elected in 1992. Lost re-election.	1993–2003: [data missing]
Enid Greene (Salt Lake City)	Republican	January 3, 1995 – January 3, 1997	104th	Elected in 1994. Retired.	1993–2003: [data missing]
Merrill Cook (Salt Lake City)	Republican	January 3, 1997 – January 3, 2001	105th 106th	Elected in 1996. Re-elected in 1998. Lost renomination.	1993–2003: [data missing]
Jim Matheson (Salt Lake City)	Democratic	January 3, 2001 – January 3, 2013	107th 108th 109th 110th 111th 112th	Elected in 2000. Re-elected in 2002. Re-elected in 2004. Re-elected in 2006. Re-elected in 2008. Re-elected in 2010. Redistricted to the 4th district.	1993–2003: [data missing]
Jim Matheson (Salt Lake City)	Democratic	January 3, 2001 – January 3, 2013	107th 108th 109th 110th 111th 112th	Elected in 2000. Re-elected in 2002. Re-elected in 2004. Re-elected in 2006. Re-elected in 2008. Re-elected in 2010. Redistricted to the 4th district.	2003–2013:
Chris Stewart (Farmington)	Republican	January 3, 2013 – September 15, 2023	113th 114th 115th 116th 117th 118th	Elected in 2012. Re-elected in 2014. Re-elected in 2016. Re-elected in 2018. Re-elected in 2020. Re-elected in 2022. Resigned.	2013–2023:
Chris Stewart (Farmington)	Republican	January 3, 2013 – September 15, 2023	113th 114th 115th 116th 117th 118th	Elected in 2012. Re-elected in 2014. Re-elected in 2016. Re-elected in 2018. Re-elected in 2020. Re-elected in 2022. Resigned.	2023–2027:
Vacant		September 15, 2023 – November 28, 2023	118th		2023–2027:
Celeste Maloy (Cedar City)	Republican	November 28, 2023 – present	118th 119th	Elected to finish Stewart's term. Re-elected in 2024. Redistricted to the 3rd district.	2023–2027:
Blake Moore (Salt Lake City)	Republican	Assuming office on January 3, 2027		Redistricted from the 1st district and re-elected in 2026.	2027–present:

== Election results ==
=== 1912 ===
Note: The 1912 election consisted of an all-party election to the two at-large seats. Joseph Howell was elected to the first at-large seat on the basis of winning the most votes overall, while Jacob Johnson was elected to the second at-large seat.

1912 United States House of Representatives elections
Party	Candidate	Votes	%
Republican	Joseph Howell	43,133	19.45
Republican	Jacob Johnson	42,047	18.96
Democratic	Mathonihah Thomas	37,192	16.77
Democratic	Tollman D. Johnson	36,640	16.52
Progressive	S.H. Love	22,358	10.08
Progressive	Lewis Larson	21,934	9.89
Socialist	Murray E. King	8,971	4.05
Socialist	William M. Knerr	8,953	4.04
Socialist Labor	Elias Anderson	505	0.23
Total votes		221,733	100.0
Republican win (new seat)			

=== 1914 ===
1914 United States House of Representatives elections
Party	Candidate	Votes	%
Democratic	James Henry Mays	25,617	47.49
Republican	Elmer O. Leatherwood	25,459	47.20
Socialist	A.H. Kempton	2,861	5.31
Total votes		53,937	100.0
Democratic gain from Republican			

=== 1916 ===
1916 United States House of Representatives elections
Party	Candidate	Votes	%
Democratic	James Henry Mays (Incumbent)	39,847	56.87
Republican	Charles R. Mabey	27,778	39.65
Socialist	Murray E. King	2,440	3.48
Total votes		70,065	100.0
Democratic hold			

=== 1918 ===
1918 United States House of Representatives elections
Party	Candidate	Votes	%
Democratic	James Henry Mays (Incumbent)	23,931	58.68
Republican	William Spry	16,134	39.56
Socialist	A.H. Kempton	719	1.76
Total votes		40,784	100.0
Democratic hold			

=== 1920 ===
1920 United States House of Representatives elections
Party	Candidate	Votes	%
Republican	Elmer O. Leatherwood	39,239	54.82
Democratic	Mathonihah Thomas	28,201	39.40
Farmer–Labor	Marvin P. Bales	2,437	3.40
Socialist	C.T. Stoney	1,696	2.38
Total votes		71,573	100.0
Republican gain from Democratic			

=== 1922 ===
1922 United States House of Representatives elections
Party	Candidate	Votes	%
Republican	Elmer O. Leatherwood (Incumbent)	28,591	50.43
Democratic	David C. Dunbar	26,145	46.12
Farmer–Labor	E. G. Locke	1,959	3.45
Total votes		56,695	100.0
Republican hold			

=== 1924 ===
1924 United States House of Representatives elections
Party	Candidate	Votes	%
Republican	Elmer O. Leatherwood (Incumbent)	41,888	56.66
Democratic	James H. Waters	32,045	43.34
Total votes		73,933	100.0
Republican hold			

=== 1926 ===
1926 United States House of Representatives elections
Party	Candidate	Votes	%
Republican	Elmer O. Leatherwood (Incumbent)	42,073	60.18
Democratic	William R. Wallace Jr.	27,006	38.63
Socialist	Otto E. Parsons	835	1.19
Total votes		69,914	100.0
Republican hold			

=== 1928 ===
1928 United States House of Representatives elections
Party	Candidate	Votes	%
Republican	Elmer O. Leatherwood (Incumbent)	46,866	50.22
Democratic	Joshua H. Paul	46,025	49.31
Socialist	T. F. Eynon	439	0.47
Total votes		93,330	100.0
Republican hold			

=== 1930 (special) ===
1930 Utah's 2nd congressional district special election
Party	Candidate	Votes	%
Republican	Frederick C. Loofbourow	35,349	44.13
Democratic	Joshua H. Paul	33,915	42.34
Liberty	George N. Lawrence	10,591	13.22
Socialist	Otto E. Parsons	253	0.32
Total votes		80,108	100.0
Republican hold			

=== 1930 ===
1930 United States House of Representatives elections
Party	Candidate	Votes	%
Republican	Frederick C. Loofbourow	35,106	44.29
Democratic	Joshua H. Paul	33,618	42.41
Liberty	George N. Lawrence	10,303	13.00
Socialist	Otto E. Parsons	239	0.30
Total votes		79,266	100.0
Republican hold			

=== 1932 ===
1932 United States House of Representatives elections
Party	Candidate	Votes	%
Democratic	J. W. Robinson	62,400	57.08
Republican	Frederick C. Loofbourow (Incumbent)	46,919	42.92
Total votes		109,319	100.0
Democratic gain from Republican			

=== 1934 ===
1934 United States House of Representatives elections
Party	Candidate	Votes	%
Democratic	J. W. Robinson (Incumbent)	58,175	62.30
Republican	Frederick C. Loofbourow	34,007	36.42
Communist	Carl Bjork	788	0.84
Socialist	A. L. Porter	405	0.43
Total votes		93,375	100.0
Democratic hold			

=== 1936 ===
1936 United States House of Representatives elections
Party	Candidate	Votes	%
Democratic	J. W. Robinson (Incumbent)	81,119	69.75
Republican	A. V. Watkins	34,855	29.97
Socialist	Joseph L. Hansen	318	0.28
Total votes		116,292	100.0
Democratic hold			

=== 1938 ===
1938 United States House of Representatives elections
Party	Candidate	Votes	%
Democratic	J. W. Robinson (Incumbent)	58,456	62.31
Republican	Dean F. Brayton	35,359	37.69
Total votes		93,815	100.0
Democratic hold			

=== 1940 ===
1940 United States House of Representatives elections
Party	Candidate	Votes	%
Democratic	J. W. Robinson (Incumbent)	86,874	63.32
Republican	A. Sherman Christenson	50,332	36.68
Total votes		137,206	100.0
Democratic hold			

=== 1942 ===
1942 United States House of Representatives elections
Party	Candidate	Votes	%
Democratic	J. W. Robinson (Incumbent)	43,582	55.75
Republican	Reed E. Vetterli	34,586	44.25
Total votes		78,168	100.0
Democratic hold			

=== 1944 ===
1944 United States House of Representatives elections
Party	Candidate	Votes	%
Democratic	J. W. Robinson (Incumbent)	89,844	62.27
Republican	Quayle Cannon Jr.	54,440	37.73
Total votes		144,284	100.0
Democratic hold			

=== 1946 ===
1946 United States House of Representatives elections
Party	Candidate	Votes	%
Republican	William A. Dawson	56,402	52.71
Democratic	J. W. Robinson (Incumbent)	50,598	47.29
Total votes		107,000	100.0
Republican gain from Democratic			

=== 1948 ===
1948 United States House of Representatives elections
Party	Candidate	Votes	%
Democratic	Reva Beck Bosone	92,770	57.46
Republican	William A. Dawson (Incumbent)	68,693	42.54
Total votes		161,463	100.0
Democratic gain from Republican			

=== 1950 ===
1950 United States House of Representatives elections
Party	Candidate	Votes	%
Democratic	Reva Beck Bosone (Incumbent)	84,283	53.40
Republican	Ivy Baker Priest	73,535	46.60
Total votes		157,818	100.0
Democratic hold			

=== 1952 ===
1952 United States House of Representatives elections
Party	Candidate	Votes	%
Republican	William A. Dawson	105,296	52.55
Democratic	Reva Beck Bosone (Incumbent)	95,084	47.45
Total votes		200,380	100.0
Republican gain from Democratic			

=== 1954 ===
1954 United States House of Representatives elections
Party	Candidate	Votes	%
Republican	William A. Dawson (Incumbent)	90,864	57.16
Democratic	Reva Beck Bosone	68,090	42.84
Total votes		158,954	100.0
Republican hold			

=== 1956 ===
1956 United States House of Representatives elections
Party	Candidate	Votes	%
Republican	William A. Dawson (Incumbent)	119,683	57.64
Democratic	Oscar W. McConkie Jr.	87,970	42.36
Total votes		207,653	100.0
Republican hold			

=== 1958 ===
1958 United States House of Representatives elections
Party	Candidate	Votes	%
Democratic	David S. King	91,213	51.11
Republican	William A. Dawson (Incumbent)	87,234	48.89
Total votes		178,447	100.0
Democratic gain from Republican			

=== 1960 ===
1960 United States House of Representatives elections
Party	Candidate	Votes	%
Democratic	David S. King (Incumbent)	120,771	50.82
Republican	Sherman P. Lloyd	116,881	49.18
Total votes		237,652	100.0
Democratic hold			

=== 1962 ===
1962 United States House of Representatives elections
Party	Candidate	Votes	%
Republican	Sherman P. Lloyd	108,385	53.92
Democratic	Bruce Sterling Jenkins	92,631	46.08
Total votes		201,016	100.0
Republican gain from Democratic			

=== 1964 ===
1964 United States House of Representatives elections
Party	Candidate	Votes	%
Democratic	David S. King	149,754	57.54
Republican	Thomas G. Judd	110,512	42.46
Total votes		260,266	100.0
Democratic gain from Republican			

=== 1966 ===
1966 United States House of Representatives elections
Party	Candidate	Votes	%
Republican	Sherman P. Lloyd	96,426	61.25
Democratic	David S. King (Incumbent)	61,001	38.75
Total votes		157,427	100.0
Republican gain from Democratic			

=== 1968 ===
1968 United States House of Representatives elections
Party	Candidate	Votes	%
Republican	Sherman P. Lloyd (Incumbent)	130,127	61.65
Democratic	Galen J. Ross	80,948	38.35
Total votes		211,075	100.0
Republican hold			

=== 1970 ===
1970 United States House of Representatives elections
Party	Candidate	Votes	%
Republican	Sherman P. Lloyd (Incumbent)	97,549	52.27
Democratic	Adolph Herman Nance	87,000	46.61
American Independent	Stephen D. Marsh	2,094	1.12
Total votes		186,643	100.0
Republican hold			

=== 1972 ===
1972 United States House of Representatives elections
Party	Candidate	Votes	%
Democratic	Wayne Owens	132,832	48.89
Republican	Sherman P. Lloyd (Incumbent)	107,185	39.45
American	Bruce R. Bangerter	31,685	11.66
Total votes		271,702	100.0
Democratic gain from Republican			

=== 1974 ===
1974 United States House of Representatives elections
Party	Candidate	Votes	%
Democratic	Allan Howe	105,739	49.48
Republican	Stephen Harmsen	100,259	46.92
American	Roben J. Schafer	6,482	3.03
Libertarian	Karl J. Bray	1,218	0.57
Total votes		213,698	100.0
Democratic hold			

=== 1976 ===
1976 United States House of Representatives elections
Party	Candidate	Votes	%
Republican	David Daniel Marriott	144,861	52.43
Democratic	Allan Howe (Incumbent)	110,931	40.15
Democratic	Daryl J. McCarty (as a write-in)	20,508	7.42
Total votes		276,300	100.0
Republican gain from Democratic			

=== 1978 ===
1978 United States House of Representatives elections
Party	Candidate	Votes	%
Republican	David Daniel Marriott (Incumbent)	121,492	62.26
Democratic	Edwin Brown Firmage	68,899	35.30
American Independent	Lawrence Rey Tophman	1,940	0.99
Independent	Bruce Bangerter	1,512	0.77
Independent	William C. Hoyle	1,323	0.68
Total votes		195,166	100.0
Republican hold			

=== 1980 ===
1980 United States House of Representatives elections
Party	Candidate	Votes	%
Republican	David Daniel Marriott (Incumbent)	194,885	67.02
Democratic	Arthur L. Monson	87,967	30.25
Independent	Stan Larsen	5,411	1.86
American	Steven Ray Montgomery	1,520	0.52
Socialist Workers	David P. Hurst	982	0.34
Total votes		290,765	100.0
Republican hold			

=== 1982 ===
1982 United States House of Representatives elections
Party	Candidate	Votes	%
Republican	David Daniel Marriott (Incumbent)	92,109	53.84
Democratic	Frances Farley	78,981	46.16
Total votes		171,090	100.0
Republican hold			

=== 1984 ===
1984 United States House of Representatives elections
Party	Candidate	Votes	%
Republican	David Smith Monson	105,540	49.37
Democratic	Frances Farley	105,044	49.13
Libertarian	Hugh A. Butler	1,456	0.68
Independent	James Waters	962	0.45
American	Maryellen Gardner	791	0.37
Total votes		213,793	100.0
Republican hold			

=== 1986 ===
1986 United States House of Representatives elections
Party	Candidate	Votes	%
Democratic	Wayne Owens	76,921	55.18
Republican	M. Tom Shimizu	60,967	43.74
Libertarian	Stephen Carmichael Carr	1,302	0.93
Socialist Workers	Scott Alan Breen	200	0.14
Total votes		139,390	100.0
Democratic gain from Republican			

=== 1988 ===
1988 United States House of Representatives elections
Party	Candidate	Votes	%
Democratic	Wayne Owens (Incumbent)	112,129	57.40
Republican	Richard Snelgrove	80,212	41.06
Libertarian	Michael Lee	2,997	1.54
Total votes		195,338	100.0
Democratic hold			

=== 1990 ===
1990 United States House of Representatives elections
Party	Candidate	Votes	%
Democratic	Wayne Owens (Incumbent)	85,167	57.60
Republican	Genevieve Atwood	58,869	39.81
Independent	Lawrence Rey Topham	3,424	2.31
Socialist Workers	Eleanor Garcia	411	0.28
Total votes		147,871	100.0
Democratic hold			

=== 1992 ===
1992 United States House of Representatives elections
Party	Candidate	Votes	%
Democratic	Karen Shepherd	127,738	50.50
Republican	Enid Greene	118,037	46.66
Independent	A. Peter Crane	6,274	2.48
Socialist Workers	Eileen Koschak	650	0.26
Total votes		252,969	100.0
Democratic hold			

=== 1994 ===
1994 United States House of Representatives elections
Party	Candidate	Votes	%
Republican	Enid Greene	85,507	45.83
Democratic	Karen Shepherd (Incumbent)	66,911	35.86
Independent	Merrill Cook	34,167	18.31
Total votes		186,585	100.0
Republican gain from Democratic			

=== 1996 ===
1996 United States House of Representatives elections
Party	Candidate	Votes	%
Republican	Merrill Cook	129,963	54.99
Democratic	Rocky Anderson	100,283	42.44
Independent American	Arly H. Pedersen	3,070	1.30
Natural Law	Catherine Carter	2,981	1.26
Write-in		24	0.01
Total votes		236,321	100.0
Republican hold			

=== 1998 ===
1998 United States House of Representatives elections
Party	Candidate	Votes	%
Republican	Merrill Cook (Incumbent)	93,718	52.76
Democratic	Lily Eskelsen	77,198	43.46
Independent	Ken Larsen	3,998	2.25
Libertarian	Brian E. Swim	1,390	0.78
Independent American	Arly H. Pedersen	813	0.46
Natural Law	Robert C. Lesh	524	0.29
Total votes		177,641	100.0
Republican hold			

=== 2000 ===
2000 United States House of Representatives elections
Party	Candidate	Votes	%
Democratic	Jim Matheson	145,021	55.86
Republican	Derek W. Smith	107,114	41.26
Independent American	Bruce Bangerter	4,704	1.81
Libertarian	Peter Pixton	2,165	0.83
Independent	Steven Alberts Voris	597	0.23
Total votes		259,601	100.0
Democratic gain from Republican			

=== 2002 ===
2002 United States House of Representatives elections
Party	Candidate	Votes	%
Democratic	Jim Matheson (Incumbent)	110,764	49.43
Republican	John Swallow	109,123	48.69
Green	Patrick S. Diehl	2,589	1.16
Libertarian	Ron Copier	1,622	0.72
Total votes		224,098	100.0
Democratic hold			

=== 2004 ===
2004 United States House of Representatives elections
Party	Candidate	Votes	%
Democratic	Jim Matheson (Incumbent)	187,250	54.76
Republican	John Swallow	147,778	43.21
Constitution	Jeremy Paul Petersen	3,541	1.04
Green	Patrick S. Diehl	2,189	0.64
Personal Choice	Ronald R. Amos	1,210	0.35
Total votes		341,968	100.0
Democratic hold			

=== 2006 ===
2006 United States House of Representatives elections
Party	Candidate	Votes	%
Democratic	Jim Matheson (Incumbent)	133,231	59.00
Republican	LaVar Christensen	84,234	37.30
Constitution	W. David Perry	3,395	1.50
Green	Bob Brister	3,338	1.48
Libertarian	Austin Sherwood Lett	1,620	0.72
Total votes		225,818	100.0
Democratic hold			

=== 2008 ===
2008 United States House of Representatives elections
Party	Candidate	Votes	%
Democratic	Jim Matheson (Incumbent)	220,666	63.36
Republican	Bill Dew	120,083	34.47
Libertarian	Matthew Arndt	4,576	1.31
Constitution	Dennis Ray Emery	3,000	0.86
Total votes		348,325	100.0
Democratic hold			

=== 2010 ===
2010 United States House of Representatives elections
Party	Candidate	Votes	%
Democratic	Jim Matheson (Incumbent)	127,151	50.49
Republican	Morgan Philpot	116,001	46.06
Constitution	Randall Hinton	4,578	1.82
Independent	Dave Glissmeyer	2,391	0.95
Independent	Wayne L. Hill	1,726	0.69
Total votes		251,847	100.0
Democratic hold			

=== 2012 ===
2012 United States House of Representatives elections
Party	Candidate	Votes	%
Republican	Chris Stewart	154,523	62.17
Democratic	Jay Seegmiller	83,176	33.47
Constitution	Jonathan D. Garrard	5,051	2.03
Independent	Joseph Andrade	2,971	1.20
Independent	Charles E. Kimball	2,824	1.14
Total votes		248,545	100.0
Republican gain from Democratic			

=== 2014 ===
2014 United States House of Representatives elections
Party	Candidate	Votes	%
Republican	Chris Stewart (Incumbent)	88,915	60.82
Democratic	Luz Robles	47,585	32.55
Constitution	Shaun McCausland	4,509	3.08
Independent American	Wayne L. Hill	3,328	2.28
Independent	Bill Barron	1,734	1.19
Write-In	Warren Rogers	117	0.08
Total votes		146,188	100.0
Republican hold			

=== 2016 ===
2016 United States House of Representatives elections
Party	Candidate	Votes	%
Republican	Chris Stewart (Incumbent)	170,524	61.60
Democratic	Charlene Albarran	93,778	33.88
Constitution	Paul J. McCollaum Jr.	12,517	4.52
Total votes		276,819	100.0
Republican hold			

=== 2018 ===
2018 United States House of Representatives elections
Party	Candidate	Votes	%
Republican	Chris Stewart (Incumbent)	151,489	56.10
Democratic	Shireen Ghorbani	105,051	38.90
Libertarian	Jeffrey Whipple	13,504	5.00
Total votes		270,044	100.0
Republican hold			

=== 2020 ===
2020 United States House of Representatives elections
Party	Candidate	Votes	%
Republican	Chris Stewart (Incumbent)	208,997	59.0
Democratic	Kael Weston	129,762	36.6
Libertarian	Rob Latham	15,465	4.4
Total votes		354,224	100.0
Republican hold			

=== 2022 ===
2022 United States House of Representatives elections
Party	Candidate	Votes	%
Republican	Chris Stewart (incumbent)	154,883	59.71
Democratic	Nicholas Mitchell	88,224	34.01
United Utah	Jay McFarland	8,622	3.32
Constitution	Cassie Easley	7,670	2.96
Total votes		259,399	100
Republican hold			

=== 2023 ===
2023 Utah's 2nd congressional district special election
Party	Candidate	Votes	%	±%
Republican	Celeste Maloy	89,866	57.07	−2.64
Democratic	Kathleen Riebe	52,949	33.62	−0.39
Libertarian	Bradley Green	4,528	2.88	N/A
Constitution	Cassie Easley	3,678	2.34	−0.62
United Utah	January Walker	2,856	1.81	−1.51
Independent	Perry Myers	2,276	1.45	N/A
Independent	Joseph Buchman	1,281	0.81	N/A
Write-in		39	0.02	N/A
Total votes		157,473	100.00	
Republican hold				

=== 2024 ===
2024 Utah's 2nd congressional district election
Party	Candidate	Votes	%
Republican	Celeste Maloy (incumbent)	205,234	58.0
Democratic	Nathaniel Woodward	121,114	34.2
Constitution	Cassie Easley	19,650	5.6
Independent	Tyler Murset	7,840	2.2
Total votes		353,838	100.0
Republican hold			

== See also ==
- Utah's congressional districts
- List of United States congressional districts
