= Utah's 3rd congressional district =

U.S. House district for Utah

Coordinates: 38°41′48″N 110°12′59″W

- Interactive map of district boundaries
- Representative: Mike Kennedy; R–Alpine
- Population (2025): 837,872
- Median household income: $101,702
- Ethnicity: 77.8% White; 12.4% Hispanic; 4.0% Two or more races; 2.3% Asian; 1.7% Native American; 0.8% Pacific Islander Americans; 0.7% Black; 0.4% other
- Cook PVI: R+10

Utah's 3rd congressional district is a congressional district in the United States House of Representatives. It is located in southern and eastern Utah and includes the cities of Orem and Provo.

The district was created when Utah was awarded an extra congressional seat following redistricting cycle after the 1980 census. Five of its six Representatives have been Republicans; Bill Orton, a Democrat, represented the district from 1991 to 1997. The current Representative is Republican Mike Kennedy, who was elected in 2024.

== Recent election results from statewide races ==
=== 2023–2027 boundaries ===
Year	Office	Results
2008	President	McCain 65% - 32%
2012	President	Romney 77% - 23%
2016	President	Trump 46% - 26%
2016	Senate	Lee 70% - 25%
2016	Governor	Herbert 69% - 27%
2016	Attorney General	Reyes 68% - 23%
2016	Treasurer	Damschen 64% - 29%
2016	Auditor	Dougall 66% - 29%
2018	Senate	Romney 65% - 29%
2020	President	Trump 57% - 38%
2020	Governor	Cox 63% - 30%
2020	Attorney General	Reyes 61% - 34%
2022	Senate	Lee 52% - 44%
2024	President	Trump 58% - 39%
2024	Senate	Curtis 63% - 31%
2024	Governor	Cox 53% - 28%
2024	Attorney General	Brown 58% - 28%
2024	Treasurer	Oaks 66% - 29%
2024	Auditor	Cannon 64% - 31%

=== 2027–2033 boundaries ===
Year	Office	Results
2008	President	McCain 72% - 25%
2012	President	Romney 83% - 17%
2016	President	Trump 57% - 19%
2016	Senate	Lee 77% - 19%
2016	Governor	Herbert 76% - 20%
2016	Attorney General	Reyes 73% - 18%
2016	Treasurer	Damschen 70% - 23%
2016	Auditor	Dougall 72% - 22%
2018	Senate	Romney 70% - 22%
2020	President	Trump 68% - 28%
2020	Governor	Cox 71% - 23%
2020	Attorney General	Reyes 70% - 24%
2022	Senate	Lee 64% - 32%
2024	President	Trump 69% - 28%
2024	Senate	Curtis 71% - 22%
2024	Governor	Cox 57% - 20%
2024	Attorney General	Brown 67% - 20%
2024	Treasurer	Oaks 74% - 21%
2024	Auditor	Cannon 73% - 22%

== List of members representing the district ==
Representative	Party	Years	Cong ress	Electoral history	Counties
District established January 3, 1983
Howard Nielson (Provo)	Republican	January 3, 1983 – January 3, 1991	98th 99th 100th 101st	Elected in 1982. Re-elected in 1984. Re-elected in 1986. Re-elected in 1988. Retired.	1983–1993; Carbon, Daggett, Duchesne, Emery, Grand, Salt Lake, San Juan, Sanpete, Sevier, Summit, Uintah, Utah, and Wasatch
Bill Orton (Provo)	Democratic	January 3, 1991 – January 3, 1997	102nd 103rd 104th	Elected in 1990. Re-elected in 1992. Re-elected in 1994. Lost re-election.	1983–1993; Carbon, Daggett, Duchesne, Emery, Grand, Salt Lake, San Juan, Sanpete, Sevier, Summit, Uintah, Utah, and Wasatch
Bill Orton (Provo)	Democratic	January 3, 1991 – January 3, 1997	102nd 103rd 104th	Elected in 1990. Re-elected in 1992. Re-elected in 1994. Lost re-election.	1993–2003; Carbon, Daggett, Duchesne, Emery, Garfield, Grand, Kane, Morgan, Piute, Salt Lake, San Juan, Sanpete, Sevier, Summit, Uintah, Utah, Wasatch, and Wayne
Chris Cannon (Mapleton)	Republican	January 3, 1997 – January 3, 2009	105th 106th 107th 108th 109th 110th	Elected in 1996. Re-elected in 1998. Re-elected in 2000. Re-elected in 2002. Re-elected in 2004. Re-elected in 2006. Lost renomination.	1993–2003; Carbon, Daggett, Duchesne, Emery, Garfield, Grand, Kane, Morgan, Piute, Salt Lake, San Juan, Sanpete, Sevier, Summit, Uintah, Utah, Wasatch, and Wayne
Chris Cannon (Mapleton)	Republican	January 3, 1997 – January 3, 2009	105th 106th 107th 108th 109th 110th	Elected in 1996. Re-elected in 1998. Re-elected in 2000. Re-elected in 2002. Re-elected in 2004. Re-elected in 2006. Lost renomination.	2003–2013 Beaver, Juab, Millard, Salt Lake, Sanpete, Sevier, and Utah
Jason Chaffetz (Alpine)	Republican	January 3, 2009 – June 30, 2017	111th 112th 113th 114th 115th	Elected in 2008. Re-elected in 2010. Re-elected in 2012. Re-elected in 2014. Re-elected in 2016. Resigned.	2003–2013 Beaver, Juab, Millard, Salt Lake, Sanpete, Sevier, and Utah
Jason Chaffetz (Alpine)	Republican	January 3, 2009 – June 30, 2017	111th 112th 113th 114th 115th	Elected in 2008. Re-elected in 2010. Re-elected in 2012. Re-elected in 2014. Re-elected in 2016. Resigned.	2013–2023 Carbon, Emery, Grand, Salt Lake, San Juan, Utah, and Wasatch
Vacant		June 30, 2017 – November 13, 2017	115th		2013–2023 Carbon, Emery, Grand, Salt Lake, San Juan, Utah, and Wasatch
John Curtis (Provo)	Republican	November 13, 2017 – January 3, 2025	115th 116th 117th 118th	Elected to finish Chaffetz's term. Re-elected in 2018. Re-elected in 2020. Re-elected in 2022. Retired to run for U.S. Senator.	2013–2023 Carbon, Emery, Grand, Salt Lake, San Juan, Utah, and Wasatch
John Curtis (Provo)	Republican	November 13, 2017 – January 3, 2025	115th 116th 117th 118th	Elected to finish Chaffetz's term. Re-elected in 2018. Re-elected in 2020. Re-elected in 2022. Retired to run for U.S. Senator.	2023–2027: Carbon, Daggett, Duchesne, Emery, Grand, Salt Lake, San Juan, Summit, Uintah, Utah, and Wasatch
Mike Kennedy (Alpine)	Republican	January 3, 2025 – present	119th	Elected in 2024. Redistricted to the 4th district.	2023–2027: Carbon, Daggett, Duchesne, Emery, Grand, Salt Lake, San Juan, Summit, Uintah, Utah, and Wasatch
Celeste Maloy (Cedar City)	Republican	Assuming office on January 3, 2027		Redistricted from the 2nd district and re-elected in 2026.	2027–present:

== Election results ==
=== 1982 ===
1982 United States House of Representatives elections in Utah, 3rd district
Party	Candidate	Votes	%
Republican	Howard C. Nielson	108,478	76.86
Independent	Henry A. Huish	32,661	23.14
Total votes		141,139	100.0
Republican win (new seat)			

=== 1984 ===
1984 United States House of Representatives elections in Utah, 3rd district
Party	Candidate	Votes	%
Republican	Howard C. Nielson (Incumbent)	138,918	74.46
Democratic	Bruce R. Baird	46,560	24.95
Libertarian	D.W. Crosby	1,094	0.59
Total votes		186,572	100.0
Republican hold			

=== 1986 ===
1986 United States House of Representatives elections in Utah, 3rd district
Party	Candidate	Votes	%
Republican	Howard C. Nielson (Incumbent)	86,599	66.58
Democratic	Dale F. Gardiner	42,582	32.74
Socialist Workers	David P. Hurst	893	0.68
Total votes		130,074	100.0
Republican hold			

=== 1988 ===
1988 United States House of Representatives elections in Utah, 3rd district
Party	Candidate	Votes	%
Republican	Howard C. Nielson (Incumbent)	129,951	66.83
Democratic	Robert W. Stringham	60,018	30.86
American	E. Dean Christensen	3,285	1.69
Socialist Workers	Judy Stranahan	1,207	0.62
Total votes		194,461	100.0
Republican hold			

=== 1990 ===
1990 United States House of Representatives elections in Utah, 3rd district
Party	Candidate	Votes	%
Democratic	Bill Orton	79,163	58.35
Republican	Karl Snow	49,452	36.45
American	Robert J. Smith	6,542	4.82
Socialist Workers	Anthony Melvin Dutrow	519	0.38
Total votes		135,676	100.0
Democratic gain from Republican			

=== 1992 ===
1992 United States House of Representatives elections in Utah, 3rd district
Party	Candidate	Votes	%
Democratic	Bill Orton (Incumbent)	135,029	58.95
Republican	Richard R. Harrington	84,019	36.68
Independent	Wayne L. Hill	5,764	2.52
Independent	Charles M. Wilson	2,068	0.90
Libertarian	Doug Jones	1,797	0.78
Socialist Workers	Nels J'Anthony	384	0.17
Total votes		229,061	100.0
Democratic hold			

=== 1994 ===
1994 United States House of Representatives elections in Utah, 3rd district
Party	Candidate	Votes	%
Democratic	Bill Orton (Incumbent)	91,505	58.98
Republican	Dixie Thompson	61,839	39.86
Socialist Workers	Barbara Greenway	1,802	1.16
Total votes		155,146	100.0
Democratic hold			

=== 1996 ===
1996 United States House of Representatives elections in Utah, 3rd district
Party	Candidate	Votes	%
Republican	Chris Cannon	106,220	51.14
Democratic	Bill Orton (Incumbent)	98,178	47.27
Libertarian	Amy L. Lassen	2,341	1.13
Independent	Gerald "Bear" Slothower	706	0.34
Socialist Workers	John Phillip Langford	270	0.13
Total votes		207,715	100.0
Republican gain from Democratic			

=== 1998 ===
1998 United States House of Representatives elections in Utah, 3rd district
Party	Candidate	Votes	%
Republican	Chris Cannon (Incumbent)	100,830	76.90
Independent American	Will Christensen	20,720	15.80
Libertarian	Kitty K. Burton	9,553	7.29
Write-in		20	0.01
Total votes		131,123	100.0
Republican hold			

=== 2000 ===
2000 United States House of Representatives elections in Utah, 3rd district
Party	Candidate	Votes	%
Republican	Chris Cannon (Incumbent)	138,943	58.54
Democratic	Donald Dunn	88,547	37.31
Independent American	Michael J. Lehman	5,436	2.29
Libertarian	Kitty K. Burton	3,570	1.50
Natural Law	Randall Tolpinrud	852	0.36
Total votes		237,348	100.0
Republican hold			

=== 2002 ===
2002 United States House of Representatives elections in Utah, 3rd district
Party	Candidate	Votes	%
Republican	Chris Cannon (Incumbent)	103,598	67.43
Democratic	Nancy Jane Woodside	44,533	28.98
Libertarian	Kitty K. Burton	5,511	3.59
Write-in	John William Maurin	1	0.00
Total votes		153,643	100.0
Republican hold			

=== 2004 ===
2004 United States House of Representatives elections in Utah, 3rd district
Party	Candidate	Votes	%
Republican	Chris Cannon (Incumbent)	173,010	63.39
Democratic	Beau Babka	88,748	32.52
Constitution	Ronald Winfield	5,089	1.86
Libertarian	Jim Dexter	3,691	1.35
Personal Choice	Curtis Darrell James	2,390	0.88
Total votes		272,928	100.0
Republican hold			

=== 2006 ===
2006 United States House of Representatives elections in Utah, 3rd district
Party	Candidate	Votes	%
Republican	Chris Cannon (Incumbent)	95,455	57.71
Democratic	Christian Burridge	53,330	32.24
Constitution	Jim Noorlander	14,533	8.79
Libertarian	Philip Lear Hallman	2,080	1.26
Total votes		165,398	100.0
Republican hold			

=== 2008 ===
2008 United States House of Representatives elections in Utah, 3rd district
Party	Candidate	Votes	%
Republican	Jason Chaffetz	187,035	65.61
Democratic	Bennion Spencer	80,626	28.28
Constitution	Jim Noorlander	17,408	6.11
Total votes		285,069	100.0
Republican hold			

=== 2010 ===
2010 United States House of Representatives elections in Utah, 3rd district
Party	Candidate	Votes	%
Republican	Jason Chaffetz (Incumbent)	139,721	72.32
Democratic	Karen Hyer	44,320	22.94
Constitution	Douglas Sligting	4,596	2.38
Libertarian	Jake Shannon	2,945	1.52
Independent	Joseph L. Puente	1,604	0.83
Total votes		193,186	100.0
Republican hold			

=== 2012 ===
2012 United States House of Representatives elections in Utah, 3rd district
Party	Candidate	Votes	%
Republican	Jason Chaffetz (Incumbent)	198,828	76.61
Democratic	Soren Simonsen	60,719	23.39
Total votes		259,547	100.0
Republican hold			

=== 2014 ===
2014 United States House of Representatives elections in Utah, 3rd district
Party	Candidate	Votes	%
Republican	Jason Chaffetz (Incumbent)	102,952	72.21
Democratic	Brian Wonnacott	32,059	22.48
Independent American	Zack Strong	3,192	2.24
Unaffiliated	Stephen P. Tryon	2,584	1.81
Unaffiliated	Ben J. Mates	1,513	1.06
Write-in	David A. Else	280	0.20
Total votes		142,580	100.0
Republican hold			

=== 2016 ===
2016 United States House of Representatives elections in Utah, 3rd district
Party	Candidate	Votes	%
Republican	Jason Chaffetz (Incumbent)	209,589	73.46
Democratic	Stephen P. Tryon	75,716	26.54
Total votes		285,305	100.0
Republican hold			

=== 2017 (special) ===
2017 Utah's 3rd congressional district special election
Party	Candidate	Votes	%
Republican	John Curtis	85,739	58.03
Democratic	Kathie Allen	37,778	25.57
United Utah	Jim Bennett	13,745	9.30
Independent	Sean Whalen	4,550	3.08
Libertarian	Joe Buchman	3,643	2.47
Independent American	Jason Christensen	2,286	1.55
Write-in	Brendan Phillips	—	—
Write-in	Russell Paul Roesler	—	—
Total votes		147,741	100.00
Republican hold			

=== 2018 ===
2018 United States House of Representatives elections in Utah, 3rd district
Party	Candidate	Votes	%
Republican	John Curtis (Incumbent)	174,856	67.55
Democratic	James Courage Singer	70,686	27.31
Independent American	Gregory C. Duerden	6,686	2.58
United Utah	Timothy L. Zeidner	6,630	2.56
Total votes		258,858	100.00
Republican hold			

=== 2020 ===
2020 United States House of Representatives elections in Utah, 3rd district
Party	Candidate	Votes	%
Republican	John Curtis (Incumbent)	246,674	68.77
Democratic	Devin Thorpe	96,067	26.78
Constitution	Daniel Cummings	8,889	2.48
United Utah	Thomas McNeill	7,040	1.97
Total votes		358,670	100.00
Republican hold			

=== 2022 ===
2022 United States House of Representatives elections in Utah, 3rd district
Party	Candidate	Votes	%
Republican	John Curtis (incumbent)	182,497	64.40
Democratic	Glenn Wright	83,687	29.53
Libertarian	Michael Stoddard	8,287	2.92
Constitution	Daniel Cummings	4,874	1.72
Independent American	Aaron Heineman	4,035	1.42
Total votes		283,380	100
Republican hold			

=== 2024 ===
2024 Utah's 3rd congressional district election
Party	Candidate	Votes	%
Republican	Mike Kennedy	242,496	66.4
Democratic	Glenn Wright	122,780	33.6
Total votes		365,276	100.0
Republican hold			

== Historical district boundaries ==
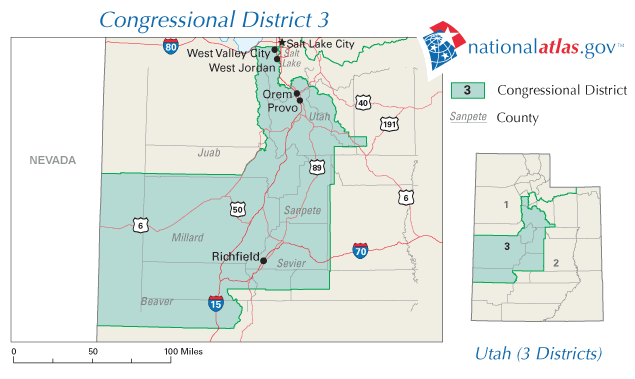
2003 – 2013

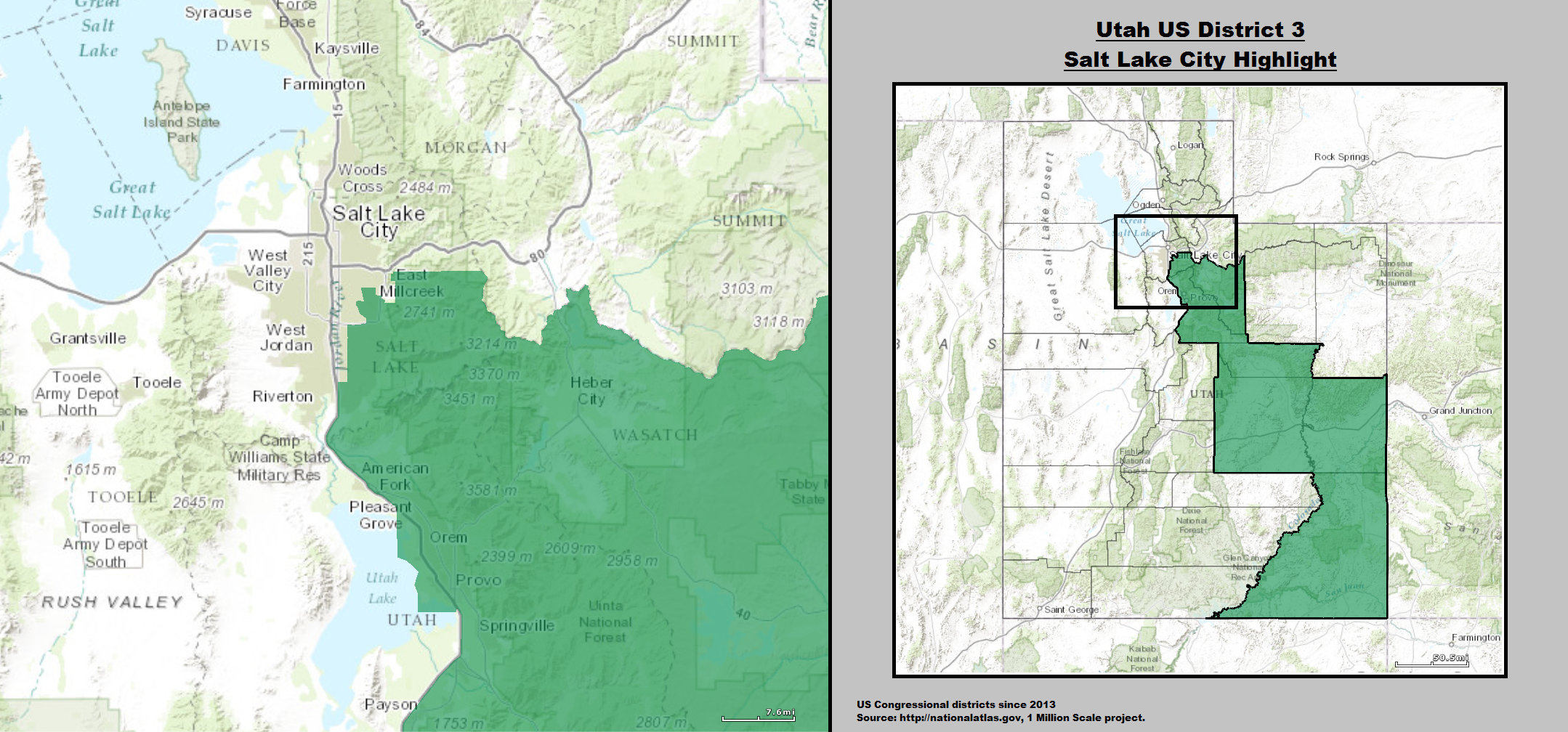
2013 – 2023

== See also ==
- Utah's congressional districts
- List of United States congressional districts
- Utah's 3rd congressional district special election, 2017
