= Utah's 4th congressional district =

U.S. House district for Utah

Coordinates: 40.6700°N 111.9300°W

- Interactive map of district boundaries
- Representative: Burgess Owens; R–Salt Lake City
- Distribution: 96.09% urban; 3.91% rural
- Population (2025): 922,261
- Median household income: $113,588
- Ethnicity: 74.2% White; 16.1% Hispanic; 3.7% Two or more races; 2.6% Asian; 1.4% Pacific Islander Americans; 1.2% Black; 0.9% other
- Cook PVI: R+14

Utah's 4th congressional district is a congressional district created by the state legislature as a result of reapportionment by Congress after the 2010 census showed population increases in the state relative to other states. Prior to 2010 reapportionment, Utah had three congressional districts.

Some 85 percent of the new district is concentrated in Salt Lake County and it includes a portion of Salt Lake City, which is shared with the 1st and 2nd districts; it also includes parts of Utah and Juab counties and all of Sanpete County. With a Cook Partisan Voting Index rating of R+14, it is the most Republican district in Utah, a state with an all-Republican congressional delegation.

As a result of redistricting, the 2012 party candidates included Democratic U.S. Congressman Jim Matheson, who had previously represented Utah's 2nd congressional district from 2001 to 2013. The Republican nominee was Mia Love, mayor of Saratoga Springs and running for Congress for the first time. She won the Republican nomination in 2012 over two state representatives, Stephen Sandstrom and Carl Wimmer, at the Republican state convention.

Democratic candidate Matheson narrowly won the election against Love on November 6, 2012, and represented Utah's 4th congressional district until January 2015. He decided not to seek re-election. In 2014, Mia Love ran again for the seat and won in the general election, defeating Democratic candidate Doug Owens. She became the first Haitian American and the first black female Republican elected to Congress, as well as the first black person of either sex elected to Congress from Utah.

In the 2018 elections, Love ran for a third term, losing to Salt Lake County mayor Ben McAdams by 694 votes out of almost 270,000. As a result of McAdams's election, the district became the most Republican district in the country to be represented by a Democrat. In 2020, Republican Burgess Owens narrowly defeated McAdams to regain the congressional seat for the Republican Party and was re-elected with over 61% of the vote in 2022 and 2024.

== Recent election results from statewide races ==
=== 2023–2027 boundaries ===
Year	Office	Results
2008	President	McCain 64% - 33%
2012	President	Romney 77% - 23%
2016	President	Trump 45% - 24%
2016	Senate	Lee 71% - 24%
2016	Governor	Herbert 69% - 26%
2016	Attorney General	Reyes 68% - 22%
2016	Treasurer	Damschen 63% - 29%
2016	Auditor	Dougall 65% - 28%
2018	Senate	Romney 66% - 27%
2020	President	Trump 61% - 35%
2020	Governor	Cox 66% - 27%
2020	Attorney General	Reyes 63% - 31%
2022	Senate	Lee 56% - 40%
2024	President	Trump 62% - 35%
2024	Senate	Curtis 65% - 29%
2024	Governor	Cox 54% - 26%
2024	Attorney General	Brown 60% - 26%
2024	Treasurer	Oaks 68% - 27%
2024	Auditor	Cannon 66% - 29%

=== 2027–2033 boundaries ===
Year	Office	Results
2008	President	McCain 69% - 28%
2012	President	Romney 82% - 18%
2016	President	Trump 50% - 20%
2016	Senate	Lee 76% - 20%
2016	Governor	Herbert 74% - 22%
2016	Attorney General	Reyes 72% - 19%
2016	Treasurer	Damschen 68% - 24%
2016	Auditor	Dougall 70% - 24%
2018	Senate	Romney 70% - 24%
2020	President	Trump 64% - 31%
2020	Governor	Cox 71% - 24%
2020	Attorney General	Reyes 67% - 27%
2022	Senate	Lee 58% - 38%
2024	President	Trump 65% - 32%
2024	Senate	Curtis 68% - 26%
2024	Governor	Cox 56% - 23%
2024	Attorney General	Brown 63% - 23%
2024	Treasurer	Oaks 71% - 24%
2024	Auditor	Cannon 69% - 26%

== List of members representing the district ==
Member	Party	Years	Cong ress	Electoral history	Counties
District established January 3, 2013
Jim Matheson (Salt Lake City)	Democratic	January 3, 2013 – January 3, 2015	113th	Redistricted from the 2nd district and re-elected in 2012. Retired.	2013–2023 Parts of Juab, Salt Lake, Sanpete, and Utah
Mia Love (Saratoga Springs)	Republican	January 3, 2015 – January 3, 2019	114th 115th	Elected in 2014. Re-elected in 2016. Lost re-election.	2013–2023 Parts of Juab, Salt Lake, Sanpete, and Utah
Ben McAdams (Salt Lake City)	Democratic	January 3, 2019 – January 3, 2021	116th	Elected in 2018. Lost re-election.	2013–2023 Parts of Juab, Salt Lake, Sanpete, and Utah
Burgess Owens (Salt Lake City)	Republican	January 3, 2021 – present	117th 118th 119th	Elected in 2020. Re-elected in 2022. Re-elected in 2024. Retiring at the end of term.	2023–2027 Sanpete; parts of Juab, Salt Lake, and Utah
Mike Kennedy (Alpine)	Republican	Assuming office on January 3, 2027		Redistricted from the 3rd district and re-elected in 2026.	2027–present:

== Election results ==
=== 2012 ===
2012 election results
Party	Candidate	Votes	%
Democratic	Jim Matheson (Incumbent)	119,803	48.84
Republican	Mia Love	119,035	48.53
Libertarian	Jim L. Vein	6,439	2.63
Total votes		245,277	100.0
Democratic win (new seat)			

=== 2014 ===
2014 election results
Party	Candidate	Votes	%
Republican	Mia Love	64,390	50.04
Democratic	Doug Owens	60,165	46.75
Libertarian	Jim L. Vein	1,154	0.90
Total votes		125,709	97.7
Republican gain from Democratic			

=== 2016 ===
2016 election results
Party	Candidate	Votes	%
Republican	Mia Love (Incumbent)	147,597	53.76
Democratic	Doug Owens	113,413	41.30
Constitution	Collin R. Simonsen	13,559	4.94
Total votes		274,569	100.0
Republican hold			

=== 2018 ===
2018 election results
Party	Candidate	Votes	%
Democratic	Ben McAdams	134,964	50.13
Republican	Mia Love (Incumbent)	134,270	49.87
Independent	Jonathan Larele Peterson (write-in)	37	0.0
Total votes		269,271	100.0
Democratic gain from Republican			

=== 2020 ===
2020 election results
Party	Candidate	Votes	%
Republican	Burgess Owens	179,688	47.7
Democratic	Ben McAdams (Incumbent)	175,923	46.7
Libertarian	John Molnar	13,053	3.5
United Utah	Jonia Broderick	8,037	2.1
Total votes		376,701	100.0 (Note: Reported)
Republican gain from Democratic			

=== 2022 ===
2022 election results
Party	Candidate	Votes	%
Republican	Burgess Owens (incumbent)	155,110	61.05
Democratic	Darlene McDonald	82,181	32.35
United Utah	January Walker	16,740	6.59
Independent	Jonathan L. Peterson (write-in)	25	0.01
Total votes		254,056	100
Republican hold			

=== 2024 ===
2024 Utah's 4th congressional district election
Party	Candidate	Votes	%
Republican	Burgess Owens (incumbent)	230,627	63.4
Democratic	Katrina Fallick-Wang	109,838	30.2
United Utah	Vaughn Cook	17,347	4.8
Independent	M. Evan Bullard	5,856	1.6
Total votes		363,668	100.0
Republican hold			
