= 2024 Utah Attorney General election =

- November 5, 2024
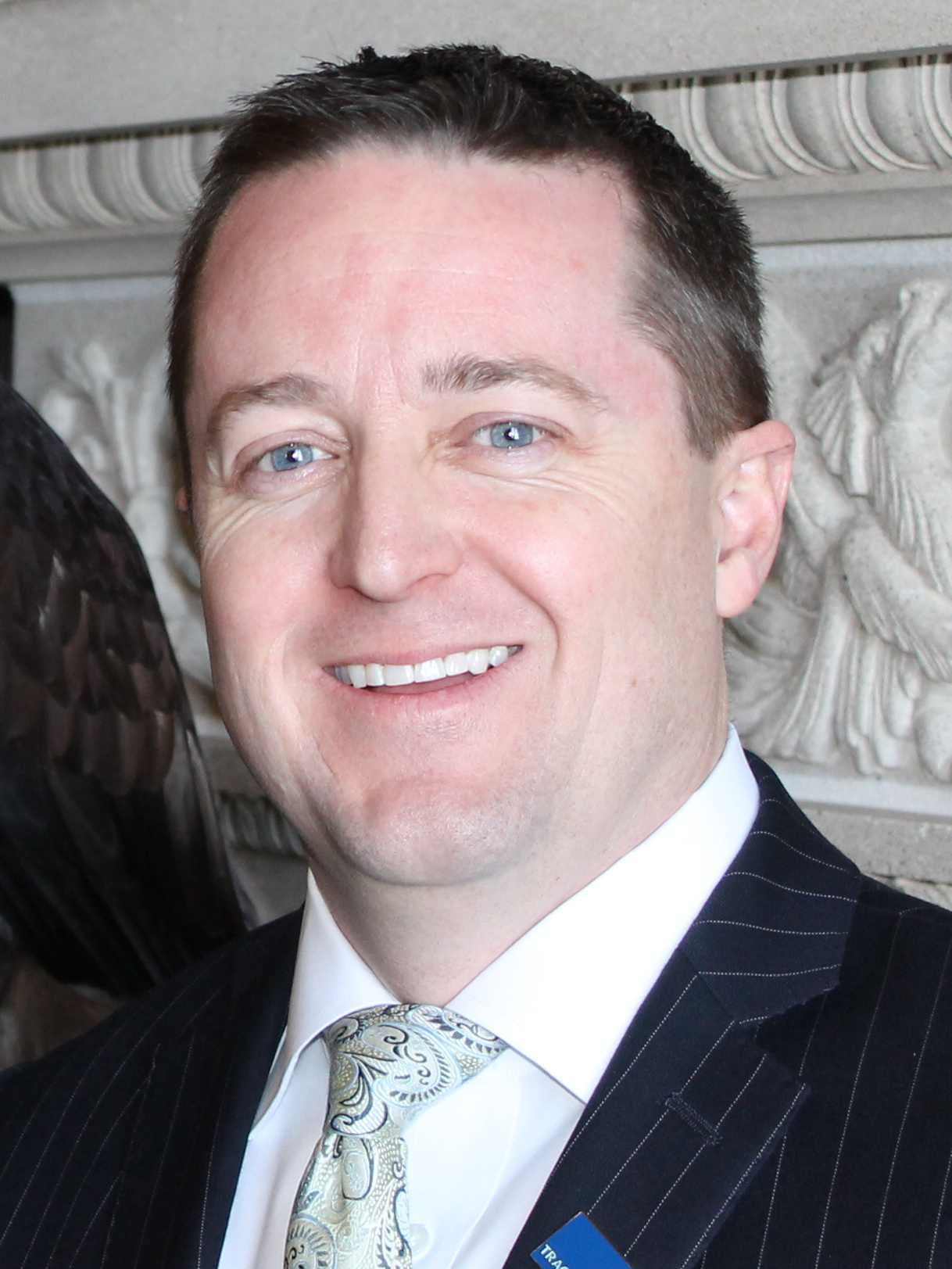

Nominee	Derek Brown	Rudy Bautista	Michelle Quist
Party	Republican	Democratic	United Utah
Popular vote	838,445	401,234	103,831
Percentage	57.84%	27.68%	7.16%
- Brown: 40–50% 50–60% 60–70% 70–80% 80–90% Bautista: 40–50%
Attorney General before election
Sean Reyes
Republican
Elected Attorney General
Derek Brown
Republican

The 2024 Utah Attorney General election was held on November 5, 2024, to elect the attorney general of Utah. The election was held alongside various federal and state elections, including for governor. Incumbent Sean Reyes was eligible to run for re-election to a third full term in office, but instead decided to retire. The Republican primary election took place on June 25, 2024.

Former Republican state representative Derek Brown defeated Democrat Rudy Bautista with 57.84% of the vote.

== Republican primary ==
=== Candidates ===
==== Nominee ====
- Derek Brown, former state representative and former chair of the Utah Republican Party

==== Eliminated in primary ====
- Frank Mylar, assistant attorney general and candidate for attorney general in 2000
- Rachel Terry, director of the Utah Division of Risk Management and assistant attorney general

==== Eliminated at convention ====
- Trent Christensen, attorney and candidate for Utah's 4th congressional district in 2020

==== Declined ====
- Sean Reyes, incumbent attorney general

==== Endorsements ====
Derek Brown

Statewide officials

- Spencer Cox, governor of Utah (2021–present)
- Gary Herbert, governor of Utah (2009–2021)

U.S. senators

- Mike Lee, U.S. senator from Utah (2011–present)
Frank Mylar

Political parties

- Utah Republican Party (co-endorsement with Terry)
Rachel Terry

Statewide officials

- Ken Paxton, Texas attorney general

Political parties

- Utah Republican Party (co-endorsement with Mylar)

Labor unions

- Utah Fraternal Order of Police

=== Convention results ===
State Republican convention results, 2024
Candidate	Round 1		Round 2	
Candidate	Votes	%	Votes	%
Frank Mylar	1618	42.83%	2234	59.76%
Rachel Terry	1189	31.47%	1504	40.24%
Derek Brown	631	16.70%	Eliminated	
Trent Christensen	340	9.00%	Eliminated	

=== Debate ===
2024 Utah attorney general election Republican primary debate
No.	Date	Host	Moderator	Link	Republican	Republican	Republican
Key: P Participant A Absent N Not invited I Invited W Withdrawn							
Key: P Participant A Absent N Not invited I Invited W Withdrawn					Derek Brown	Frank Mylar	Rachel Terry
1	Jun. 11, 2024	Utah Debate Commission	Glen Mills	YouTube	P	P	P

=== Results ===
Republican primary results
Party	Candidate	Votes	%
Republican	Derek Brown	178,164	43.59%
Republican	Rachel Terry	133,019	32.55%
Republican	Frank Mylar	97,522	23.86%
Total votes		408,705	100.00%

== Democratic primary ==
=== Candidates ===
==== Nominee ====
- Rudy Bautista, defense attorney and Libertarian nominee for attorney general in 2020

==== Eliminated at convention ====
- David Carlson, assistant attorney general and former North Ogden city attorney

=== Convention results ===
State Democratic convention results, 2024
Candidate	Round 1		
Candidate	Rudy Bautista	511	64.44%
David Carlson	282	35.56%	

== Libertarian convention ==
=== Candidates ===
==== Nominee ====
- Andrew McCullough, former chair of the Utah Libertarian Party and nominee for attorney general in 2016

== United Utah convention ==
=== Candidates ===
==== Nominee ====
- Michelle Quist, litigation and appellate lawyer at Buchalter

== General election ==
=== Predictions ===
Source	Ranking	As of
Sabato's Crystal Ball	Safe R	July 25, 2024

=== Results ===
2024 Utah Attorney General election
Party	Candidate	Votes	%	±%
Republican	Derek Brown	838,445	57.84%	−2.74
Democratic	Rudy Bautista	401,234	27.68%	−6.06
United Utah	Michelle Quist	103,831	7.16%	N/A
Libertarian	Andrew McCullough	55,932	3.86%	−1.82
Independent	Austin Hepworth	50,053	3.45%	N/A
Total votes		1,449,495	100.00%	N/A
Republican hold				

==== By county ====
County	Derek Brown Republican		Rudy Bautista Democratic		Michelle Quist United Utah		Various candidates Other parties		Margin		Total
County	#	%	#	%	#	%	#	%	#	%	Total
Beaver	2,537	81.47%	299	9.60%	78	2.50%	200	6.42%	2,238	71.87%	3,114
Box Elder	21,581	75.69%	3,647	12.79%	1,229	4.31%	2,057	7.21%	17,934	62.90%	28,514
Cache	38,140	64.71%	12,343	20.94%	3,954	6.71%	4,505	7.64%	25,797	43.77%	58,942
Carbon	6,126	66.54%	2,196	23.85%	294	3.19%	590	6.41%	3,930	42.69%	9,206
Daggett	426	80.08%	78	14.66%	18	3.38%	10	1.88%	348	65.41%	532
Davis	96,989	59.74%	37,809	23.29%	13,799	8.50%	13,767	8.48%	59,180	36.45%	162,364
Duchesne	7,178	81.49%	768	8.72%	266	3.02%	596	6.77%	6,410	72.77%	8,808
Emery	4,069	82.82%	483	9.83%	117	2.38%	244	4.97%	3,586	72.99%	4,913
Garfield	2,121	77.69%	410	15.02%	87	3.19%	112	4.10%	1,711	62.67%	2,730
Grand	2,213	42.99%	2,389	46.41%	260	5.05%	286	5.56%	-176	-3.42%	5,148
Iron	20,047	73.74%	4,034	14.84%	1,080	3.97%	2,024	7.45%	16,013	58.90%	27,185
Juab	5,032	79.36%	535	8.44%	211	3.33%	563	8.88%	4,497	70.92%	6,341
Kane	3,117	71.61%	900	20.68%	134	3.08%	202	4.64%	2,217	50.93%	4,353
Millard	5,120	81.57%	520	8.28%	204	3.25%	433	6.90%	4,600	73.28%	6,277
Morgan	5,249	77.71%	807	11.95%	259	3.83%	440	6.51%	4,442	65.76%	6,755
Piute	832	88.32%	68	7.22%	8	0.85%	34	3.61%	764	81.10%	942
Rich	1,152	81.41%	148	10.46%	50	3.53%	65	4.59%	1,004	70.95%	1,415
Salt Lake	215,066	43.53%	205,331	41.56%	42,077	8.52%	31,623	6.40%	9,735	1.97%	494,097
San Juan	3,373	54.88%	2,169	35.29%	206	3.35%	398	6.48%	1,204	19.59%	6,146
Sanpete	9,751	76.48%	1,325	10.39%	597	4.68%	1,076	8.44%	8,426	66.09%	12,749
Sevier	9,011	84.29%	850	7.95%	275	2.57%	555	5.19%	8,161	76.34%	10,691
Summit	10,694	42.99%	11,669	46.91%	1,306	5.25%	1,204	4.84%	-975	-3.92%	24,873
Tooele	21,064	64.64%	7,316	22.45%	1,623	4.98%	2,586	7.94%	13,748	42.19%	32,589
Uintah	12,644	81.79%	1,506	9.74%	394	2.55%	916	5.92%	11,138	72.04%	15,460
Utah	193,005	65.97%	51,326	17.54%	24,115	8.24%	24,097	8.24%	141,679	48.43%	292,543
Wasatch	11,144	61.82%	4,680	25.96%	893	4.95%	1,310	7.27%	6,464	35.86%	18,027
Washington	66,778	70.31%	16,753	17.64%	3,473	3.66%	7,975	8.40%	50,025	52.67%	94,979
Wayne	1,181	73.67%	282	17.59%	71	4.43%	69	4.30%	899	56.08%	1,603
Weber	62,805	58.05%	30,593	28.27%	6,753	6.24%	8,048	7.44%	32,212	29.77%	108,199
Totals	838,445	57.84%	401,234	27.68%	103,831	7.16%	105,985	7.31%	437,211	30.16%	1,449,495

Counties that flipped from Democratic to Republican

- Salt Lake (largest municipality: Salt Lake City)

==== By congressional district ====
Brown won all four congressional districts.

District	Brown	Bautista	Representative
1st	57%	28%	Blake Moore
2nd	56%	30%	Celeste Maloy
3rd	58%	28%	John Curtis (118th Congress)
3rd	58%	28%	Mike Kennedy (119th Congress)
4th	60%	26%	Burgess Owens

== See also ==
- 2024 Utah elections
