= 2020 Utah elections =

Utah state elections in 2020 were held on Tuesday, November 3, 2020. Aside from its presidential primaries held on March 3, its primary elections were held on June 30, 2020.

In addition to the U.S. presidential race, Utah voters elected the Governor of Utah, 9 seats of its Board of Education, four of Utah's other executive officers, all of its seats to the House of Representatives, all of the seats of the Utah House of Representatives, and 15 of 29 seats in the Utah State Senate. Neither of the state's two U.S. Senate seats were up for election. Seven ballot measures were voted on.

== Federal offices ==
=== President of the United States ===
Utah, a stronghold for the Republican Party and thus a reliable "red state", has six electoral votes in the Electoral College. Donald Trump won with 58.13% of the vote to Joe Biden's 37.65%. On December 14, 2020, Utah cast its electoral votes for Donald Trump.

=== United States House of Representatives ===
All four of Utah's seats in the U.S. House of Representatives were up for election. The Republican Party candidates won all four seats, with the party gaining the 4th congressional district seat from the Democratic Party.

== Governor ==
Incumbent lieutenant governor Spencer Cox ran against University of Utah law professor and former CFPB official Christopher Peterson. Cox was elected to be Governor of Utah. He was elected with 64.3% of the vote.

== Attorney general ==
Incumbent Republican attorney general Sean Reyes was elected for a third term with 60.6% of the vote in the general election. In the Republican primary, he faced challenger David O. Leavitt (Utah County attorney) after former attorney general John Swallow withdrew from the race.

In the Democratic primary, attorney and ex-small claims court judge Greg Skordas, who was the Democratic nominee for the attorney general election in 2004, ran unopposed (following the withdrawal of Kevin Probasco). Rudy Bautista ran as a Libertarian.

=== Republican primary ===
==== Candidates ====
===== Nominee =====
- Sean Reyes, incumbent

===== Eliminated in the primary =====
- David Leavitt

==== Polling ====
Poll source	Date(s) administered	Sample size (Note: Key: A – all adults RV – registered voters LV – likely voters V – unclear)	Margin of error	David Leavitt	Sean Reyes	John Swallow	Undecided
Suffolk University/Salt Lake Tribune	June 4–7, 2020	500 (LV)	± 4.4%	26%	31%	–	43%
Y2 Analytics/UtahPolicy/KUTV 2 News	May 9–15, 2020	581 (LV) (Note: Including registered Republican likely primary voters and currently unaffiliated likely primary voters)	–	40%	60%	–	–
Y2 Analytics/UtahPolicy/KUTV 2 News	March 21–30, 2020	704 (LV) (Note: Including registered Republican likely primary voters and currently unaffiliated likely primary voters)	–	32%	54%	15%	–

==== Results ====
Republican primary results
Party	Candidate	Votes	%
Republican	Sean Reyes (incumbent)	275,207	54.0%
Republican	David Leavitt	234,027	46.0%
Total votes		509,234	100.0%

=== Democratic primary ===
==== Candidates ====
===== Nominee =====
- Greg Skordas

===== Eliminated at the convention =====
- Kevin Probasco

==== Polling ====
Poll source	Date(s) administered	Sample size	Margin of error	Kevin Probasco	Greg Skordas
Y2 Analytics/UtahPolicy/KUTV 2 News	March 21–30, 2020	223 (LV)	± 6.6%	28%	72%

=== General election ===
==== Polling ====
Poll source	Date(s) administered	Sample size	Margin of error	Sean Reyes (R)	Greg Skordas (D)	Other	Undecided
Lighthouse Research/Salt Lake Tribune	August 31–September 12, 2020	2,000 (RV)	± 4.38%	46%	25%	5% (Note: Bautista (L) with 5%; "Other" with no voters)	23%

==== Results ====
2020 Utah Attorney General election
Party	Candidate	Votes	%
Republican	Sean Reyes (incumbent)	878,853	60.58%
Democratic	Greg Skordas	489,500	33.74%
Libertarian	Rudy Bautista	82,444	5.68%
Total votes		1,450,797	100.00%

== Auditor ==
2020 Utah State Auditor election
- November 3, 2020
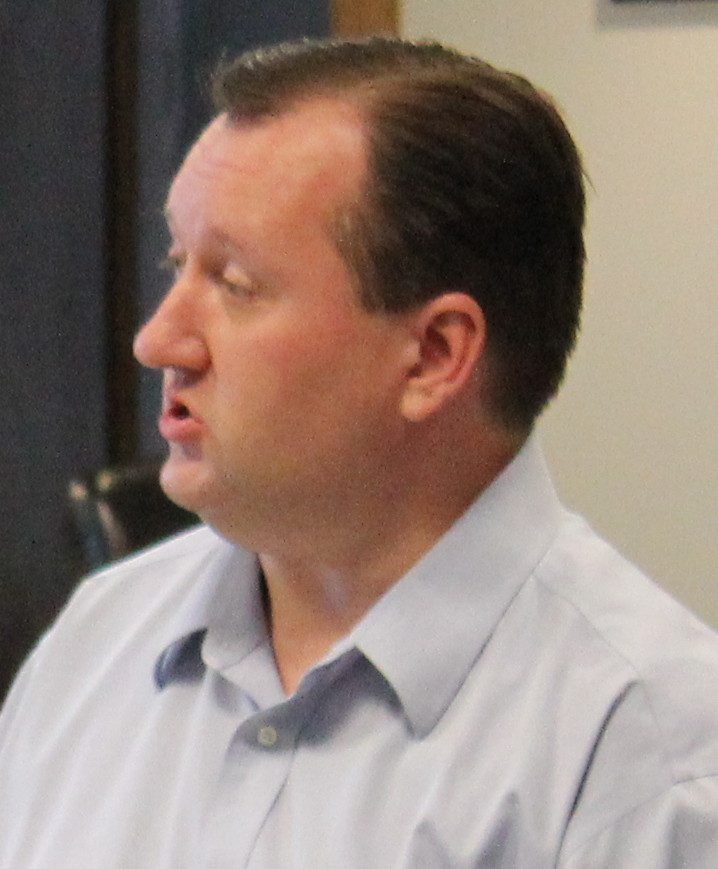

Nominee	John Dougall	Brian Fabbi	Jeffrey Ostler
Party	Republican	United Utah	Constitution
Popular vote	1,000,846	173,644	163,872
Percentage	74.8%	13.0%	12.2%
- Dougall: 60–70% 70–80% 80–90% >90%
Auditor before election
John Dougall
Republican
Elected Auditor
John Dougall
Republican

2020 Utah Auditor election
Party	Candidate	Votes	%
Republican	John Dougall (incumbent)	1,000,846	74.78%
United Utah	Brian Fabbi	173,644	12.97%
Constitution	Jeffrey Ostler	163,872	12.24%
Total votes		1,338,362	100.00%

== Treasurer ==
2020 Utah State Treasurer election
Nominee	David Damschen	Joseph Speciale	Richard Proctor
Party	Republican	Libertarian	Independent American
Popular vote	994,115	198,549	140,466
Percentage	74.57%	14.89%	10.54%
- Damschen: 60–70% 70–80% 80–90% 90–100%
State Treasurer before election
David Damschen
Republican
Elected State Treasurer
David Damschen
Republican

2020 Utah Treasurer election
Party	Candidate	Votes	%
Republican	David Damschen (incumbent)	994,115	74.57%
Libertarian	Joseph Speciale	198,549	14.89%
Independent American	Richard Proctor	140,466	10.54%
Total votes		1,333,130	100.00%

== State Board of Education ==
=== District 3 ===
==== Republican convention ====
State Republican convention results (first round)
Party	Candidate	Votes	%
Republican	Matt Hymas	99	70.2%
Republican	Laurieann Thorpe (incumbent)	42	29.8%
Total votes		141	100.0%

==== Results ====
State Board of Education, District 3
Party	Candidate	Votes	%
Republican	Matt Hymas	43,331	59.5%
Democratic	Brett Garner	29,533	40.5%
Total votes		72,864	100.0%

=== District 4 ===
==== Republican convention ====
State Republican convention results (first round)
Party	Candidate	Votes	%
Republican	Brent Strate	124	53.4%
Republican	K'Leena Furniss	108	46.6%
Total votes		232	100.0%

==== Results ====
State Board of Education, District 4
Party	Candidate	Votes	%
Republican	Brent Strate	76,774	100.0%
Total votes		76,774	100.0%

=== District 7 ===
==== Results ====
State Board of Education, District 7
Party	Candidate	Votes	%
Democratic	Carol Barlow Lear (incumbent)	80,993	100.0%
Total votes		80,993	100.0%

=== District 8 ===
==== Results ====
State Board of Education, District 8
Party	Candidate	Votes	%
Republican	Janet Cannon (incumbent)	72,201	100.0%
Total votes		72,201	100.0%

=== District 10 ===
==== Republican nomination ====
===== Convention =====
Republican convention results
Candidate	Round 1		Round 2	
Candidate	Votes	%	Votes	%
David Linford		%		%
Molly Hart		%		%
Jeffrey Ferlo		%	Eliminated	
Inactive ballots	0 ballots		0 ballots	

===== Primary =====
Republican primary results
Party	Candidate	Votes	%
Republican	Molly Hart	22,101	67.3%
Republican	David Linford	10,741	32.7%
Total votes		32,842	100.0%

==== Results ====
State Board of Education, District 10
Party	Candidate	Votes	%
Republican	Molly Hart	81,974	100.0%
Total votes		72,201	100.0%

=== District 11 ===
==== Republican convention ====
State Republican convention results (first round)
Party	Candidate	Votes	%
Republican	Natalie Cline	162	64.8%
Republican	Mike Haynes (incumbent)	88	35.2%
Total votes		250	100.0%

==== Results ====
State Board of Education, District 11
Party	Candidate	Votes	%
Republican	Natalie Cline	80,720	69.0%
Independent	Tony Zani	36,232	31.0%
Total votes		116,952	100.0%

=== District 12 ===
==== Republican convention ====
Republican convention results
Candidate	Round 1 & 2		Round 3	
Candidate	Votes	%	Votes	%
James Moss	171	56.2%	210	71.7%
Lorri-Sue Blunt	71	23.4%	83	28.3%
Joe Rivest	62	20.4%	Eliminated	
Inactive ballots	0 ballots		11 ballots	

==== Results ====
State Board of Education, District 12
Party	Candidate	Votes	%
Republican	James Moss Jr.	69,864	76.4%
Constitution	Catherine Rebekah Taylor	21,625	23.6%
Total votes		91,489	100.0%

=== District 13 ===
==== Republican nomination ====
===== Convention =====
Republican convention results
Candidate	Round 1		Round 2	
Candidate	Votes	%	Votes	%
Randy Boothe		%		%
Alyson Williams		%		%
Jeff Rust		%	Eliminated	
Inactive ballots	0 ballots		0 ballots	

===== Primary =====
Republican primary results
Party	Candidate	Votes	%
Republican	Randy Boothe	14,094	52.1%
Republican	Alyson Williams	12,978	47.9%
Total votes		27,072	100.0%

==== Results ====
State Board of Education, District 13
Party	Candidate	Votes	%
Republican	Randy Boothe	65,414	100.0%
Total votes		65,414	100.0%

=== District 15 ===
==== Republican nomination ====
===== Convention =====
Republican convention results
Candidate	Round 1		Round 2	
Candidate	Votes	%	Votes	%
Scott F. Smith	140	45.6%	161	53.8%
Kristan Norton	112	36.5%	138	46.2%
Dale M Brinkerhoff	55	17.9%	Eliminated	
Inactive ballots	0 ballots		8 ballots	

===== Primary =====
Republican primary results
Party	Candidate	Votes	%
Republican	Kristan Norton	27,351	61.2%
Republican	Scott Smith	17,368	38.8%
Total votes		27,072	100.0%

==== Results ====
State Board of Education, District 15
Party	Candidate	Votes	%
Republican	Kristan Norton	95,227	100.0%
Total votes		95,227	100.0%

== State legislature ==
All 75 seats of the Utah House of Representatives and 15 of 29 seats of the Utah State Senate were up for election. Before the election the composition of the Utah State Legislature was:

=== State senate ===
Party	# of seats
Republican	23
Democratic	6
Total	29

=== House of Representatives ===
Party	# of seats
Republican	59
Democratic	16
Total	75

After the election, the composition was:

=== State senate ===
Party	# of seats
Republican	23
Democratic	6
Total	29

=== House of Representatives ===
Party	# of seats
Republican	58
Democratic	17
Total	75

== State Judiciary ==
=== Utah Supreme Court ===
Results by county: Yes: 70–80%; 80–90%

Retain Judge John A. Pearce for 10 more years
Choice	Votes	%
For	1,025,585	81.53
Against	232,407	18.47
Total	1,257,992	100.00
Source: Ballotpedia

=== Utah Court of Appeals ===
Retain Judge Michele Christiansen for 6 more years
Choice	Votes	%
For	1,023,082	82.38
Against	218,804	17.62
Total	1,241,886	100.00
Source: Ballotpedia

Retain Judge Diana Hagen for 6 more years
Choice	Votes	%
For	1,038,612	83.06
Against	211,810	16.94
Total	1,250,422	100.00
Source: Ballotpedia

Retain Judge Ryan M. Harris for 6 more years
Choice	Votes	%
For	925,080	75.02
Against	308,015	24.98
Total	1,233,095	100.00
Source: Ballotpedia

Retain Judge David Mortensen for 6 more years
Choice	Votes	%
For	967,500	77.68
Against	277,924	22.32
Total	1,245,424	100.00
Source: Ballotpedia

Retain Judge Gregory Orme for 6 more years
Choice	Votes	%
For	994,542	80.03
Against	248,153	19.97
Total	1,242,695	100.00
Source: Ballotpedia

Retain Judge Jill Pohlman for 6 more years
Choice	Votes	%
For	1,036,007	83.13
Against	210,290	16.87
Total	1,246,297	100.00
Source: Ballotpedia

== Ballot measures ==
Measure SJR 9 is a state constitutional amendment to allow income tax to fund programs for children and people with disabilities.

=== Polling ===
Poll source	Date(s) administered	Sample size	Margin of error	For SJR 9	Against SJR 9	Undecided
Y2 Analytics/UtahPolicy/KUTV 2 News	March 21–30, 2020	1,260 (LV)	± 2.8%	46%	35%	19%

=== Amendment A ===
Update Gender Terminology
Choice	Votes	%
For	828,629	57.69
Against	607,829	42.31
Total	1,436,458	100.00
Source: Associated Press

=== Amendment B ===
Amendment B
- November 3, 2020
- Lawmaker Eligibility Timing
Yes
80–90%
70–80%

Lawmaker Eligibility Timing
Choice	Votes	%
For	1,114,795	80.10
Against	276,897	19.90
Total	1,391,692	100.00
Source: Associated Press

=== Amendment C ===
Amendment C
- November 3, 2020
- Remove Slavery Exception
Yes
80–90%
70–80%
60–70%

Remove Slavery Exception
Choice	Votes	%
For	1,138,974	80.48
Against	276,171	19.52
Total	1,415,145	100.00
Source: Associated Press

=== Amendment D ===
Amendment D
- November 3, 2020
- Revise Local Water Rights
Yes
60–70%
50–60%
No
60–70%
50–60%

Revise Local Water Rights
Choice	Votes	%
For	827,596	61.14
Against	525,985	38.86
Total	1,353,581	100.00
Source: Associated Press

=== Amendment E ===
Amendment E
- November 3, 2020
- Right to Hunt and Fish
Yes
80–90%
70–80%
60–70%

Add Right to Hunt and Fish
Choice	Votes	%
For	1,063,212	74.92
Against	355,848	25.08
Total	1,419,060	100.00
Source: Associated Press

=== Amendment F ===
Amendment F
- November 3, 2020
- Legislative Session Dates
Yes
60–70%
50–60%

Legislative Session Dates
Choice	Votes	%
For	895,435	66.51
Against	450,835	33.49
Total	1,346,270	100.00
Source: Associated Press

=== Amendment G ===
Amendment G
- November 3, 2020
- Expand Income, Prop Tax Uses
Yes
60–70%
50–60%
No
50–60%

Expand Income, Prop Tax Uses
Choice	Votes	%
For	764,420	54.09
Against	648,840	45.91
Total	1,413,260	100.00
Source: Associated Press

== Voting Information ==
The 2020 election took place against a backdrop of uncertainty. The following data tables highlight voter registration rules, in-person voting procedures, and absentee voting procedures relevant to the November 3, 2020, general election in the state of Utah.

Voter registration in Utah
Registration URL	
Registration status URL	
Registration update URL	
In-person registration deadline	October 23, 2020
Mail registration deadline	October 23, 2020
Mail postmark or receipt deadline	Received
Online registration deadline	October 23, 2020
Same-day registration	Yes
Early voting same-day registration	Yes

In-person voting in Utah
All voters required to show ID	Yes
ID types	
ID source URL	
Early voting start date	October 20, 2020
Early voting end date	October 30, 2020
Weekend voting?	Yes
Early voting source URL	
Election Day poll times	7 a.m. to 8 p.m.

Absentee voting in Utah
Are there limits on who can request a ballot?	No
Mail request deadline	N/A
Request postmark or receipt deadline	N/A
Mail return deadline	November 2, 2020
Return postmark or receipt deadline	Postmarked
Notary/witness requirements	No requirement

== Notes ==
Partisan clients
