= Jeremy Peterson =

Jeremy Peterson may refer to:

- Jeremy Peterson (politician), member of the Utah House of Representatives
- Jeremy Peterson (Hollyoaks), a character on the British television soap opera Hollyoaks
