= Allan Turner Howe =

American politician

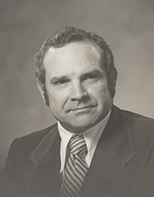

Member of the U.S. House of Representatives from Utah's 2nd district
- In office January 3, 1975 – January 3, 1977
- Preceded by: Wayne Owens
- Succeeded by: David Daniel Marriott

Personal details
- Born: September 6, 1927 South Cottonwood, Utah
- Died: December 14, 2000 (aged 73) Arlington, Virginia
- Party: Democratic
- Education: University of Utah
- Profession: attorney

Military service
- Allegiance: United States of America
- Branch/service: United States Coast Guard
- Years of service: 1946–1947

Allan Turner Howe (September 6, 1927 – December 14, 2000) was a U.S. representative from Utah.

Born in South Cottonwood near Murray, Utah, Howe attended public schools before receiving a B.S. from the University of Utah in 1952 and a J.D.L. from the same university in 1954. He served in the United States Coast Guard from 1946 to 1947.

He held a number of legal and governmental jobs, including as deputy Salt Lake County attorney, South Salt Lake city attorney, administrative assistant and field representative to U.S. Senator Frank E. Moss from 1959 to 1964, assistant attorney general of Utah from 1965 to 1966, administrative assistant to Governor Cal Rampton from 1966 to 1968, and executive director of the Four Corners Regional Development Commission from 1968 to 1972. He also practiced law in Salt Lake City, served as a delegate to Utah State Democratic conventions from 1954 to 1960 and was an alternate delegate to the 1960 Democratic National Convention.

Howe was elected as a Democrat to the Ninety-fourth Congress in 1974.

== Arrest ==
On June 13, 1976, Howe was arrested in Salt Lake City on misdemeanor charges of soliciting sex for hire after propositioning a police officer posing undercover as a prostitute. As a member of the Church of Jesus Christ of Latter-day Saints representing a district where most voters were members of the church, and amidst a rash of other congressional scandals in the summer of 1976, Howe had maintained that politicians' private moral behavior was relevant to their public service. Howe claimed that he was innocent, a victim of a politically motivated "set-up."

He retained the endorsement of local Democratic officials as he'd already been nominated at the party convention. Despite the party's efforts, he refused to step down, and the state Democratic Party executive committee then voted to co-endorse Daryl J. McCarty as a write-in candidate. Howe ultimately lost reelection to Republican Dan Marriott in November 1976.

== Later career ==
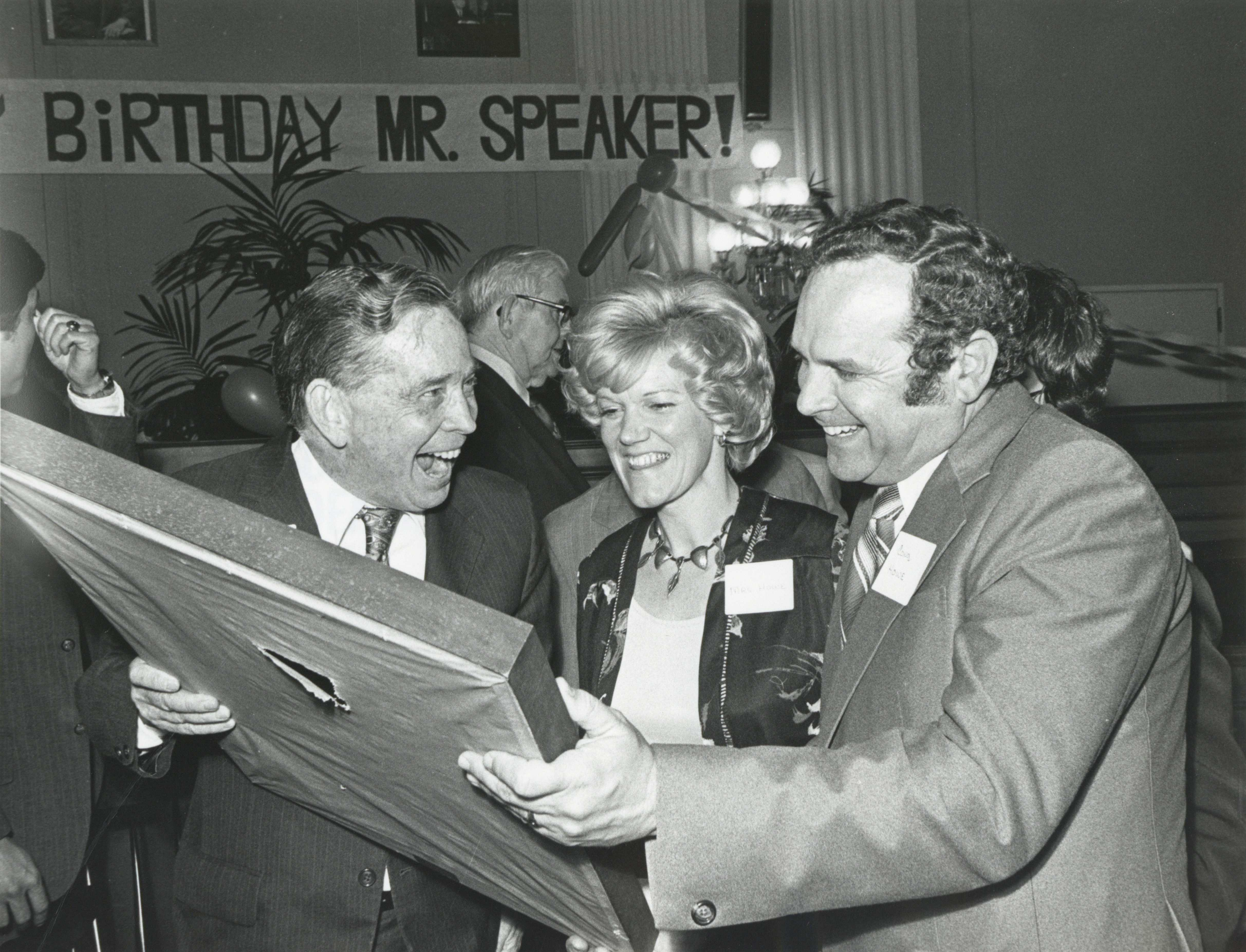
Speaker Carl Albert with Howe's wife Marlene Dee and Howe.

He was convicted of solicitation, and the conviction was upheld on appeal. Following his electoral defeat, Howe stayed in Washington, D.C., and worked as a lobbyist, including, at the end of his career, for the National Park and Hospitality Association.

== Death ==
He died in Arlington, Virginia, on December 14, 2000, at the age of 73.

== Electoral history ==
1974 United States House of Representatives elections
Party	Candidate	Votes	%
Democratic	Allan Howe	105,739	49.48
Republican	Stephen Harmsen	100,259	46.92
American	Roben J. Schafer	6,482	3.03
Libertarian	Karl J. Bray	1,218	0.57
Total votes		213,698	100.0
Democratic hold			

1976 United States House of Representatives elections
Party	Candidate	Votes	%
Republican	David Daniel Marriott	144,861	52.43
Democratic	Allan Howe (Incumbent)	110,931	40.15
Independent	Darrell McCarty (as a write-in)	20,508	7.42
Total votes		276,300	100.0
Republican gain from Democratic			

== See also ==
- List of federal political sex scandals in the United States

U.S. House of Representatives
Preceded by Wayne Owens	Member of the U.S. House of Representatives from Utah's 2nd congressional district 1975-1977	Succeeded by David D. Marriott
