= 2020 Utah Attorney General election =

- November 3, 2020
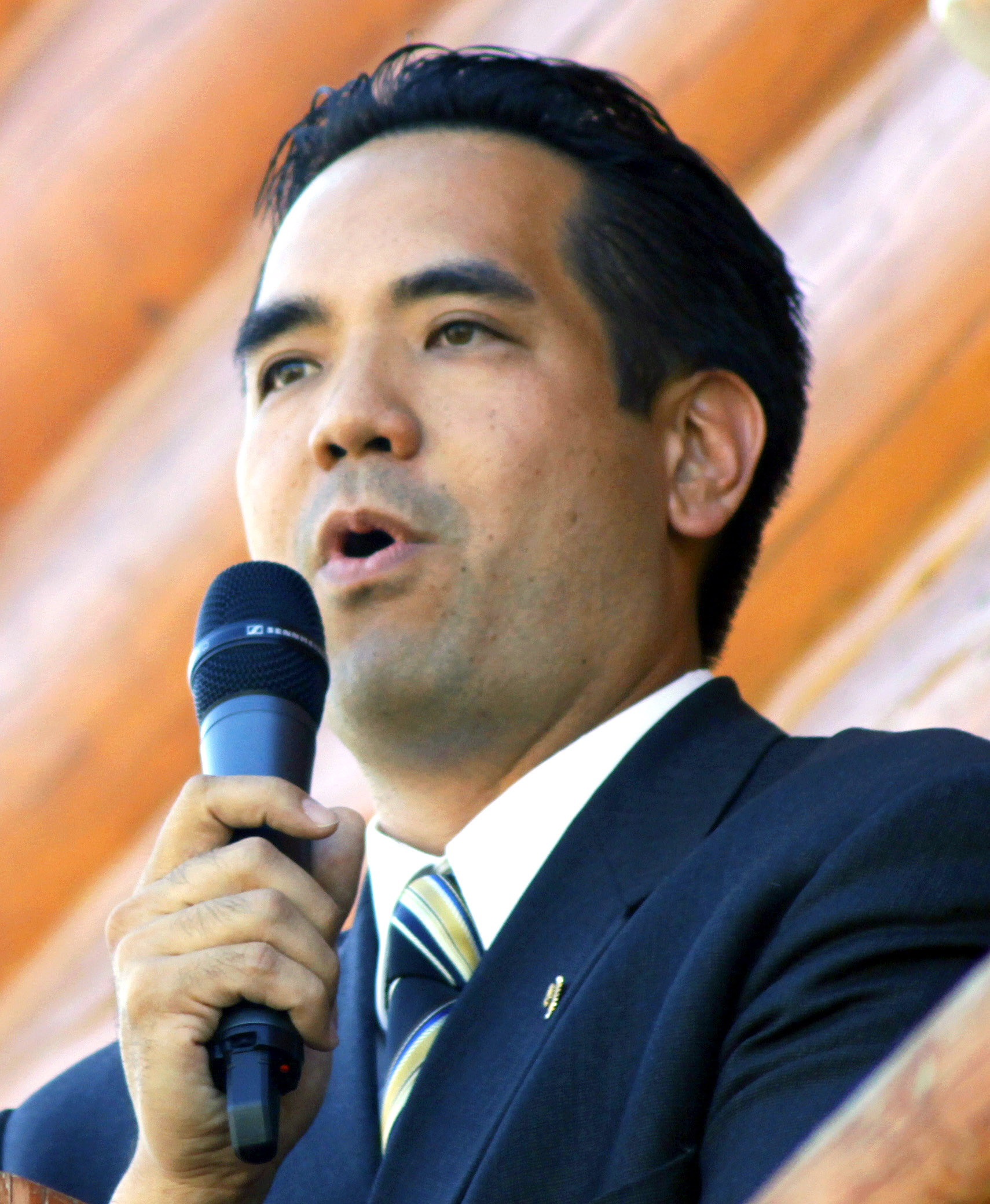

Nominee	Sean Reyes	Greg Skordas	Rudy Bautista
Party	Republican	Democratic	Libertarian
Popular vote	878,853	489,499	82,444
Percentage	60.58%	33.74%	5.68%
- Reyes: 40–50% 50–60% 60–70% 70–80% 80–90% >90% Skordas: 40–50% 50–60% 60–70% 70–80% 80–90% >90% Tie: 40–50% 50% No data
Attorney General before election
Sean Reyes
Republican
Elected Attorney General
Sean Reyes
Republican

The 2020 Utah Attorney General election was held on November 3, 2020, to elect the Attorney General of Utah. The election was held alongside various federal and state elections, including for governor. Incumbent Attorney General Sean Reyes won re-election to a second full term, defeating Democratic nominee Greg Skordas and Libertarian nominee Rudy Bautista.

The conventions for the Republican, Democratic and Libertarian parties were held on April 25. Although originally planned to be held in-person, all three conventions were moved online due to the COVID-19 pandemic.

== Republican primary ==
=== Candidates ===
==== Nominee ====
- Sean Reyes, incumbent Attorney General

==== Eliminated in primary ====
- David O. Leavitt, Utah County district attorney

==== Eliminated at convention ====
- John Swallow, former Attorney General

=== Convention ===
Voting began for the convention on April 23, with results being announced on April 27.

==== Results ====
Republican convention results
Candidate	Round 1		Round 2	
Candidate	Votes	%	Votes	%
Sean Reyes	1,778	49.80%	2,014	57.51%
David O. Leavitt	1,002	28.07%	1,488	42.49%
John Swallow	790	22.13%	Eliminated	
Inactive Ballots	0 ballots		69 ballots	

=== Primary ===
==== Endorsements ====
David O. Leavitt

Mayors

- Rocky Anderson, former Mayor of Salt Lake City (2000–2008) and Justice nominee for President of the United States in 2012

==== Polling ====
Poll source	Date(s) administered	Sample size	Margin of error	David Leavitt	Sean Reyes	Undecided
Suffolk University	June 4–7, 2020	500 (LV)	± 4.4%	26%	31%	43%

==== Debate ====
2020 Utah Attorney General election republican primary debate
No.	Date	Host	Moderator	Link	Republican	Republican
Key: P Participant A Absent N Not invited I Invited W Withdrawn						
Key: P Participant A Absent N Not invited I Invited W Withdrawn					David O. Leavitt	Sean Reyes
1	Jun. 2, 2020	Utah Debate Commission	David Magleby	YouTube	P	P

==== Results ====
Republican primary results
Party	Candidate	Votes	%
Republican	Sean Reyes (incumbent)	275,212	54.04
Republican	David O. Leavitt	234,036	45.96
Total votes		509,248	100.00

== Democratic convention ==
=== Candidates ===
==== Nominee ====
- Greg Skordas, nominee for Attorney General in 2004

==== Eliminated at convention ====
- Kevin Probasco, attorney and Republican candidate for Utah's 1st congressional district in 2018

== Libertarian convention ==
=== Candidates ===
==== Nominee ====
- Rudy Bautista, defense attorney

== General election ==
=== Debate ===
2020 Utah Attorney General debate
No.	Date	Host	Moderator	Link	Republican	Democratic
Key: P Participant A Absent N Not invited I Invited W Withdrawn						
Key: P Participant A Absent N Not invited I Invited W Withdrawn					Sean Reyes	Greg Skordas
1	Oct. 21, 2020	Utah Debate Commission	Jennifer Napier-Pearce	YouTube	P	P

=== Predictions ===
Source	Ranking	As of
The Cook Political Report	Safe R	July 17, 2020

=== Polling ===
Poll source	Date(s) administered	Sample size	Margin of error	Sean Reyes (R)	Greg Skordas (D)	Rudy Bautista (L)	Undecided
Lighthouse Research/Salt Lake Tribune	August 31 – September 12, 2020	2,000 (RV)	± 4.4%	46%	25%	5%	23%

=== Results ===
2020 Utah Attorney General election
Party	Candidate	Votes	%	±%
Republican	Sean Reyes (incumbent)	878,853	60.58%	–4.83
Democratic	Greg Skordas	489,499	33.74%	+8.67
Libertarian	Rudy Bautista	82,444	5.68%	–1.05
Total votes		1,450,797	100.00%	
Republican hold				

==== By county ====
County	Sean Reyes Republican		Greg Skordas Democratic		Rudy Bautista Libertarian	
County	#	%	#	%	#	%
Beaver	2,501	84.4%	361	12.2%	100	3.4%
Box Elder	20,977	78.9%	4,155	15.6%	1,440	5.4%
Cache	38,690	69.2%	14,118	25.3%	3,071	5.5%
Carbon	6,251	68.5%	2,456	26.9%	415	4.5%
Daggett	464	78.9%	108	18.4%	16	2.7%
Davis	108,275	64.2%	50,065	29.7%	10,390	6.2%
Duchesne	7,054	85.2%	821	9.9%	406	4.9%
Emery	3,930	82.7%	681	14.3%	143	3.0%
Garfield	2,069	78.1%	484	18.3%	97	3.7%
Grand	2,230	44.2%	2,584	51.2%	230	4.6%
Iron	18,327	76.2%	4,252	17.7%	1,479	6.1%
Juab	4,814	84.2%	671	11.7%	230	4.0%
Kane	2,958	73.1%	946	23.4%	140	3.5%
Millard	5,089	84.2%	668	11.1%	284	4.7%
Morgan	5,162	79.8%	1,010	15.6%	299	4.6%
Piute	737	86.5%	93	10.9%	22	2.6%
Rich	1,100	82.3%	193	14.4%	43	3.2%
Salt Lake	237,158	45.3%	257,002	49.1%	29,189	5.6%
San Juan	3,364	51.6%	2,671	40.9%	488	7.5%
Sanpete	10,074	81.8%	1,632	13.3%	602	4.9%
Sevier	8,758	85.9%	1,058	10.4%	378	3.7%
Summit	10,641	42.0%	13,585	53.7%	1,094	4.3%
Tooele	20,809	67.1%	8,218	26.5%	1,988	6.4%
Uintah	12,548	84.8%	1,628	11.0%	624	4.2%
Utah	201,692	72.4%	60,249	21.6%	16,513	5.9%
Wasatch	10,862	63.6%	5,421	31.7%	809	4.7%
Washington	64,546	73.5%	18,155	20.7%	5,107	5.8%
Wayne	1,183	74.7%	355	22.4%	46	2.9%
Weber	66,590	61.0%	35,860	32.8%	6,801	6.2%
Totals	878,853	60.58%	489,499	33.74%	82,444	5.68%

Counties that flipped from Republican to Democratic

- Salt Lake (largest city: Salt Lake City)
- Grand (largest municipality: Moab)

==== By congressional district ====
Reyes won all four congressional districts.

District	Reyes	Skordas	Bautista	Representative
1st	66%	28%	6%	Rob Bishop
1st	66%	28%	6%	Blake Moore
2nd	57%	37%	6%	Chris Stewart
3rd	64%	30%	5%	John Curtis
4th	55%	39%	6%	Ben McAdams
4th	55%	39%	6%	Burgess Owens
