= Cal Musselman =

American politician and real estate broker

Member of the Utah Senate from the 4th district
- Incumbent
- Assumed office January 1, 2025
- Preceded by: D. Gregg Buxton

Member of the Utah House of Representatives from the 9th district
- In office January 1, 2019 – December 31, 2024
- Preceded by: Jeremy Peterson
- Succeeded by: Jake Sawyer

Personal details
- Born: Calvin R. Musselman Salt Lake City, Utah, U.S.
- Education: Dixie State University (AS)

Military service
- Branch/service: United States Army
- Battles/wars: Gulf War

Calvin R. "Cal" Musselman is an American politician and real estate broker serving as a member of the Utah Senate from the 4th district. He previously served as a member of the Utah House of Representatives from the 9th district. Elected in 2018, he assumed office on January 1, 2019.

== Early life and education ==
Musselman was born in Salt Lake City and raised in Monticello, Utah. His father was a diesel mechanic and his mother was a school cafeteria cook. He earned an Associate of Science degree in general science from Dixie State University and studied geology at the University of Utah in 1990 and 1991.

== Career ==
Musselman served in the United States Army during the Gulf War. Since 1999, he has worked as an associate real estate broker at Golden Spike Realty in Ogden, Utah. He was elected to the Utah House of Representatives in 2018 and assumed office on January 1, 2019.

Musselman was elected to the Utah Senate in 2024.

== Electoral Record ==
2024 Utah State Senate election, District 4
Party	Candidate	Votes	%
Republican	Calvin Musselman	38,687	100

2022 Utah House of Representatives election, District 9
Party	Candidate	Votes	%
Republican	Calvin Musselman	6,238	62.8
Democratic	Neil Hansen	2,971	29.9
Libertarian	Jacob Johnson	723	7.3

2020 Utah House of Representatives election, District 9
Party	Candidate	Votes	%
Republican	Calvin Musselman	8,426	58.4
Democratic	Steve Olsen	5,999	41.6

2018 Utah House of Representatives election, District 9
Party	Candidate	Votes	%
Republican	Calvin Musselman	5,130	53.0
Democratic	Kathy Darby	4,555	47.0

== Personal life ==
Musselman and his wife live in West Haven, Utah. They previously lived in Ogden and Roy, Utah.
