= James Henry and Ida Owen Mays House =

Historic house in Idaho, United States

- U.S. National Register of Historic Places
- Location within Idaho
- Nearest city: Wendell, Idaho
- Coordinates: 42°39′56″N 114°41′46″W
- Area: less than one acre
- Built: 1920; 1924
- Architectural style: Bungalow/craftsman; Classical Revival
- NRHP reference No.: 92001412
- Added to NRHP: March 9, 1993

The James Henry and Ida Owen Mays House, in Gooding County, Idaho near Wendell, Idaho, was built in 1920 as a one-story house and was expanded to one-and-a-half stories by 1924. It was listed on the National Register of Historic Places in 1993. It was deemed significant for association with James Henry Mays (1868–1926), who was active in commercial development of the south-central Idaho area, and who served as a U.S. Congressman from the state of Utah during 1914 to 1920. Mays began acquiring property along the Snake River in Idaho in 1913 and built this house, overlooking the Snake River, as a secondary residence to his official residence in Utah.

The house is a one-and-a-half-story Craftsman-style bungalow with elements of Classical Revival architecture in its details, including in its porches' columns. It was built as a one-story structure. An upper half-story, porches, and a lean-to section were added by 1924, completing its form that still stood in 1993. It has a hipped roof and its exterior basalt rock walls rest upon a basalt rock foundation.

It is a rectangular building with a full-length wrap-around porch on its south and west sides, and a full-length, enclosed porch on its east side.

According to its NRHP nomination:

The James Henry and Ida Owen Mays house is eligible under criterion B as the only surviving property associated with James Mays' role in the commercial development of the area. Mays' endeavors, which included fruit raising, dairying and recreational use of the Snake River canyon area of south-central Idaho, typified early exploitation of the river for commercial and recreational purposes. His establishment of a fish hatchery at Crystal Springs, the first of its kind in the area, marked a shortlived, but significant effort which demonstrated the commercial potential of the hatchery business. The impact of the hatchery is still felt in the present commercial and recreational development of fish hatcheries by private and state entities.

Mays had a varied life and two wives:

Mays was born in Tennessee in 1868. As a young man, he travelled to Kansas, attended Kansas State Normal School, and later graduated from the University of Michigan law school (Bachelor of Laws, 1895 and Master of Laws, 1896). In addition to practicing law, Mays also sold life insurance and at various times lived in Chicago, Illinois; Dubuque, Iowa; and Indianapolis, Indiana. In 1902, Mays and his first wife, Sarah Elizabeth Randels, moved to Salt Lake City, Utah where they raised their five children. He found extensive coal deposits in Utah and was prominently involved with the U.S. Fuel Company, his primary source of income. Mays apparently continued to travel to the Midwest and about 1911 met Mrs. Ida Owen in Chicago, with whom he fathered seven additional children. Mays was elected a Democratic congressman from Utah in 1914, 1916, and 1918. Ida Owen and her children lived with Mays in Washington, D.C. while Sarah Elizabeth remained in Salt Lake City with her children. He did not run for re-election in 1920. He seems to have continued to claim residency in Utah; in fact, one daughter recalls that at the time of his death, he was planning to run for governor of Utah. The Idaho ranch seems to have been developed as a secondary residence and recreational get-away for himself and as a home for Ida and their children. Mays and Sarah Elizabeth divorced in 1924. Mays died at the ranch house on April 19, 1926 and was buried in the Gooding, Idaho cemetery.

Mays died at the ranch house following a stroke on April 19, 1926. His remains were buried in the Gooding Cemetery in Gooding, Idaho.

The house is located in south-central Idaho on "a grassy terrace" within the Snake River canyon, on the northern bank overlooking the river, about 1.2 miles (1.9 km) west of Niagara Springs, Idaho.

In 2018, it was still listed by the Idaho State Historical Society as a resource having historic integrity.

In 2022, however, the house may no longer exist, as satellite imagery appears either a) not to show the house at its former location at all, or b) to show the house as a modified building with a simple roof.
