= 2016 Utah Attorney General election =

- November 8, 2016
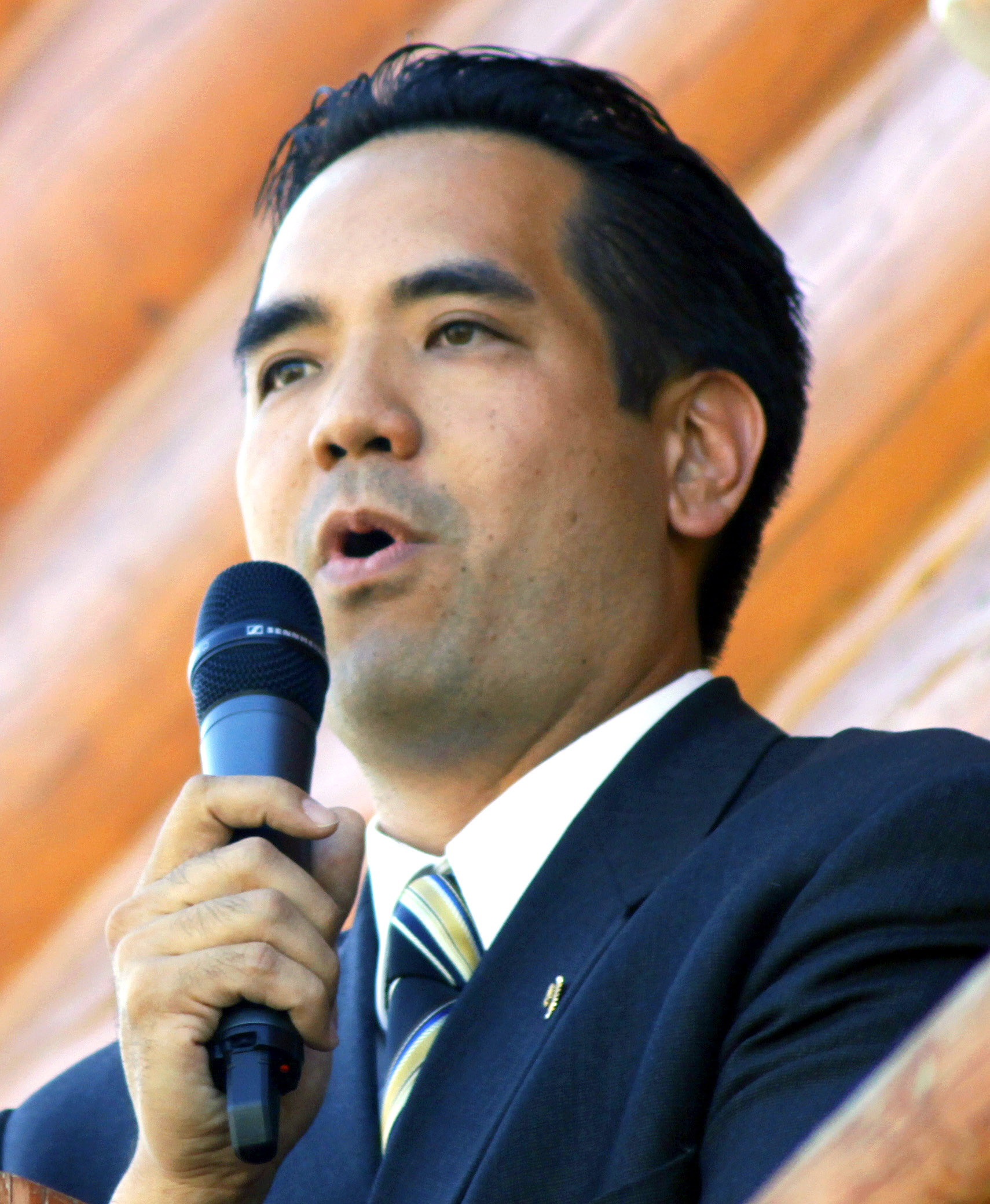
		DEM	LIB
Nominee	Sean Reyes	Jon Harper	W. Andrew McCullough
Party	Republican	Democratic	Libertarian
Popular vote	719,064	275,571	73,975
Percentage	65.41%	25.07%	6.73%
- Reyes: 40–50% 50–60% 60–70% 70–80% 80–90% Harper: 40–50%
Attorney General before election
Sean Reyes
Republican
Elected Attorney General
Sean Reyes
Republican

The 2016 Utah Attorney General election was held on November 8, 2016. Republican Sean Reyes, incumbent Attorney General of Utah, was elected to his second full term in office, defeating Democrat Jon Harper in a landslide. Reyes overperformed Republican presidential nominee Donald Trump in the concurrent presidential election by over 20%, though Harper only underperformed Democratic nominee Hillary Clinton by around 2%.

== General election ==
=== Candidates ===
- Sean Reyes, incumbent (R)
- Jon Harper, private practice lawyer (D)
- Andrew McCullough, private practice lawyer (L)
- Michael Isbell, private practice lawyer (IAP)

=== Endorsements ===
Sean Reyes

Individuals

- Harris Simmons, president and CEO of Zions Bancorporation
- David Simmons, CEO of Simmons Media Group
- Robert G. Pedersen II, chairman of the board and CEO of ZAGG
- Ken Murdock, founder of Nature's Way
- Dave Brown, president, First Utah Bank
- Brett Tolman, former United States attorney for District of Utah

Organizations

- Utah Fraternal Order of Police
Jon Harper

Individuals

- Frank Layden, former Utah Jazz head coach

=== Predictions ===
Source	Ranking
Governing	Safe R

== Results ==
General election results
Party	Candidate	Votes	%
Republican	Sean Reyes (incumbent)	719,064	65.41%
Democratic	Jon Harper	275,571	25.07%
Libertarian	Andrew McCullough	73,975	6.73%
Independent American	Michael Isbell	30,687	2.79%
Total votes		1,099,297	100.00%

=== By congressional district ===
Reyes won all four congressional districts.

District	Reyes	Harper	Representative
1st	69%	21%	Rob Bishop
2nd	61%	29%	Chris Stewart
3rd	70%	21%	Jason Chaffetz
4th	61%	29%	Mia Love

== See also ==
- 2016 Utah gubernatorial election
