= Jacob Johnson (American politician) =

American politician

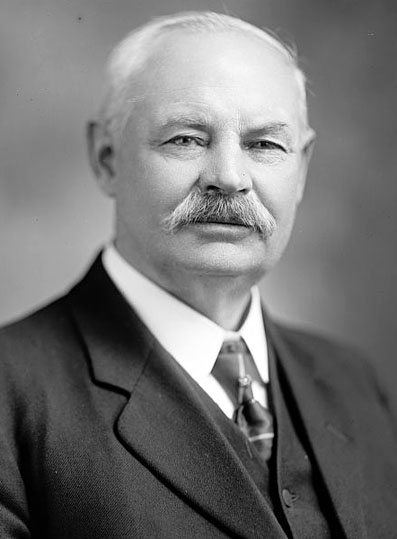

Member of the U.S. House of Representatives from Utah's 2nd district
- In office March 4, 1913 – March 3, 1915
- Preceded by: None
- Succeeded by: James Henry Mays

Personal details
- Born: November 1, 1847 Aalborg, Denmark
- Died: August 15, 1925 (aged 77) Salt Lake City, Utah, United States
- Party: Republican
- Spouse(s): Margaret Anderson (d.1885); Matilda Justesen
- Children: 8

Jacob Johnson (November 1, 1847 – August 15, 1925) was a U.S. representative from Utah.

Johnson was born in Aalborg, Denmark, but he emigrated to the United States in 1854. After living in both Utah and California, he studied law in Nevada. Returning to Utah, in 1872 he became a resident of Spring City in Sanpete County, where he was admitted to the bar in 1877. In 1880 he became a United States District Attorney, a position he held until 1888. He then served as Sanpete County's probate judge until 1890. During 1892–1894 he was prosecuting attorney in Sanpete County, overlapping an 1893–1895 term in the Utah Territorial Legislature. In 1896 Johnson became a state court judge in Utah's Seventh Judicial District. His judicial duties took him traveling throughout southeastern Utah until 1905.

Active in Republican Party politics, Johnson was a delegate to the Republican National Convention in 1912. That year Utah had just been granted its second congressional seat. Incumbent Joseph Howell was re-elected, and Johnson was elected as Utah's new representative to the 63rd United States Congress. He served one term in Congress, failing to win the nomination in 1914.

Johnson retired from politics to continue his law practice in Salt Lake City, where he died in 1925.

The Jacob Johnson house and barn still stand in Spring City. Due to their historic and architectural significance, they are included in the Spring City Historic District, listed in the National Register of Historic Places. The owners received a 2009 Heritage Award from the Utah Heritage Foundation for restoring the property.

U.S. House of Representatives
Preceded by District created	Member of the U.S. House of Representatives from Utah's 2nd congressional district 1913-1915	Succeeded by James H. Mays
