= David Daniel Marriott =

American politician (born 1939)

David Marriott
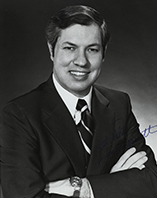

Member of the U.S. House of Representatives from Utah's 2nd district
- In office January 3, 1977 – January 3, 1985
- Preceded by: Allan Howe
- Succeeded by: David Monson

Personal details
- Born: David Daniel Marriott; November 2, 1939 (age 86) Bingham, Utah, U.S.
- Party: Republican
- Spouse: Marilyn Tingey (m. 1965; died 2026)
- Children: 4
- Education: University of Utah (BS); American College of Financial Services (PgDip)

Military service
- Allegiance: United States
- Branch/service: United States Air Force
- Years of service: 1958–1963
- Unit: Utah Air National Guard

David Daniel Marriott (born November 2, 1939) is an American politician who served as a member of the United States House of Representatives for Utah's 2nd congressional district from 1977 to 1985.

== Early life and education ==
Born in Bingham, Utah, Marriott was educated in the public schools of Sandy, Utah, and graduated from Jordan High School in 1958. He received a Bachelor of Science degree from the University of Utah in 1967 and was designated as a Chartered Life Underwriter (CLU) by the American College of Life Underwriters in 1968.

== Career ==
He later worked as a life insurance agent and was the owner/president of a Utah-based firm specializing in business and pension consultation from 1968 to 1976. Marriott also served in the Utah Air National Guard from 1958 to 1963.

=== Congress ===
Marriott was elected to the United States House of Representatives as a Republican in 1976. He won re-election three times, serving in the House for four terms from 1977 to 1985.

=== Later political campaigns ===
He was not a candidate for re-election in 1984, instead running for governor of Utah. In the 1984 Utah gubernatorial election, he lost to state House speaker Norm Bangerter, 94,421 to 72,883. He ran for his former House seat in 1990, but lost the Republican primary to Genevieve Atwood.

== Later career ==
Marriott served as a Mission president for the Church of Jesus Christ of Latter-day Saints from 2002 to 2005. He served in the South Africa Cape Town Mission.

== Personal life ==
Marriott is a resident of Salt Lake City, Utah. He was married to Marilynn Joy Tingey from August 16, 1965 until her death on July 21, 2026. They had four children and 12 grandchildren.

== Sources ==
- United States Congress. "David Daniel Marriott (id: M000143)". Biographical Directory of the United States Congress.

U.S. House of Representatives
Preceded by Allan Howe	Member of the U.S. House of Representatives from Utah's 2nd congressional district 1977–1985	Succeeded by David Monson
U.S. order of precedence (ceremonial)
Preceded by Raul Labrador as Former U.S. Representative	Order of precedence of the United States as Former U.S. Representative	Succeeded by Jason Chaffetz as Former U.S. Representative
