= James Henry Mays =

American politician

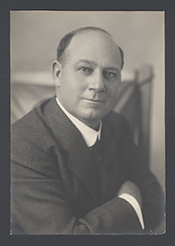

Member of the U.S. House of Representatives from Utah's 2nd district
- In office March 4, 1915 – March 3, 1921
- Preceded by: Jacob Johnson
- Succeeded by: Elmer O. Leatherwood

Personal details
- Born: June 29, 1868 Morristown, Tennessee
- Died: April 19, 1926 (aged 57) Wendell, Idaho
- Party: Democratic
- Education: University of Michigan Law School
- Profession: Lawyer

James Henry Mays (June 29, 1868 – April 19, 1926) was an American lawyer, businessman, and politician who served three terms as a U.S. representative from Utah from 1915 to 1921.

== Early life and education ==
Born in Morristown, Tennessee, Mays attended the district schools. He moved to Kansas in 1883 with his parents, who settled in Galena, Kansas. He worked in the mines and as a lumberman.

He attended the Kansas State Normal School. From 1893 to 1902 he was employed in the life insurance business in Chicago, Illinois, Dubuque, Iowa, and in Salt Lake City, Utah. He graduated from the law department of the University of Michigan at Ann Arbor in 1895.

== Career ==
He was admitted to the bar and commenced practice in Ann Arbor, Michigan. He moved to Indianapolis, Indiana, in 1896 and to Utah in 1902. Organized several industrial organizations.

=== Congress ===
Mays was elected as a Democrat to the Sixty-fourth, Sixty-fifth, and Sixty-sixth Congresses (March 4, 1915 – March 3, 1921).

He was not a candidate for reelection in 1920.

== Retirement and death ==
He retired to his stock ranch near Wendell, Idaho, and died there on April 19, 1926. He was interred in Gooding Cemetery, Gooding, Idaho.

== Legacy ==
His home near Wendell, built in 1920 and known as the James Henry and Ida Owen Mays House, was listed on the National Register of Historic Places in 1993.

== Electoral history ==
1914 United States House of Representatives elections
Party	Candidate	Votes	%
Democratic	James Henry Mays	25,617	47.49
Republican	Elmer O. Leatherwood	25,459	47.20
Socialist	A.H. Kempton	2,861	5.31
Total votes		53,937	100.0
Democratic gain from Republican			

1916 United States House of Representatives elections
Party	Candidate	Votes	%
Democratic	James Henry Mays (Incumbent)	39,847	56.87
Republican	Charles R. Mabey	27,778	39.65
Socialist	Murray E. King	2,440	3.48
Total votes		70,065	100.0
Democratic hold			

1918 United States House of Representatives elections
Party	Candidate	Votes	%
Democratic	James Henry Mays (Incumbent)	23,931	58.68
Republican	William Spry	16,134	39.56
Socialist	A.H. Kempton	719	1.76
Total votes		40,784	100.0
Democratic hold			

== Sources ==
- United States Congress. "James Henry Mays (id: M000290)". Biographical Directory of the United States Congress.

U.S. House of Representatives
Preceded by Jacob Johnson	Member of the U.S. House of Representatives from Utah's 2nd congressional district 1915-1921	Succeeded by Elmer O. Leatherwood
