= Neil Hansen =

American politician (born 1959)

Member of the Utah House of Representatives from the 9th district
- In office January 1, 1999 – January 1, 2011
- Preceded by: John B. Arrington
- Succeeded by: Jeremy Peterson

Personal details
- Born: April 6, 1959 (age 66) Ogden, Utah, U.S.
- Party: Democratic
- Spouse: Debbie (divorced)
- Children: 8
- Education: Ogden-Weber Technical College; Weber State University; Davis Technical College

Neil Hansen (born April 6, 1959) is an American politician who served as a member of the Utah House of Representatives from 1999 until 2011, representing the 9th district.

== Early life and education ==
Hansen was born on April 6, 1959, in Ogden, Utah. Hansen attended Ogden–Weber Technical College, Weber State University, and Davis Technical College, but did not earn a degree.

== Career ==
Prior to entering politics, Hansen worked in construction. He has worked as a heavy equipment operator for the Ogden City Water Department since 1981.

Hansen was elected to the Utah House of Representatives in 1998. In the 2010 election, he was defeated Republican challenger Jeremy Peterson in 2010 by six percentage points. He challenged Peterson for his old seat in 2012, but lost by 20 percentage points. Hansen ran for Utah State Treasurer in 2016, but lost to incumbent David Damschen. Hansen ran for Governor of Utah in the 2020 election, but was eliminated at the Utah Democratic Party convention.

Hansen was also a candidate for Mayor of Ogden, Utah, in 2003, 2007, and 2011, losing in the non-partisan primaries to incumbent Mayor Matthew Godfrey and Mike Caldwell.

== Personal life ==
Hansen and his ex-wife, Debbie, have eight children. He is a member of the Church of Jesus Christ of Latter-day Saints.

Utah House of Representatives
Preceded by John B. Arrington	Member of the Utah House of Representatives from the 9th district 1999–2011	Succeeded by Jeremy Peterson
