= Utah housing corporation =

The Utah Housing Corporation or UHC is a public corporation that the Utah legislature created in 1975 to advocate for affordable housing for lower-income residents in the state of Utah. UHC is an independent government agency that raises funds in order to offer mortgage loans to lower-income people and to provide resources to developers and builders for creating affordable housing projects. It does not receive any funds from the State of Utah and is completely self-supporting via the issuing of tax-exempt bonds and the creation of and selling of mortgage-backed securities to investors.

== Background ==
Utah legislation established the Utah Housing Corporation, known as the Utah Housing Finance Agency until 2001, in 1975 with the objective of finding a way to provide affordable housing for low-income and moderate-income persons by creating an adequate supply of mortgage loans with reasonable rates. The company first started under the umbrella of the Utah Economic Department then moving to Community and Culture Department; it is now affiliated with the Department of Workforce Services. From its existence, the Utah Housing Corporation has provided financing for more than 65,000 Utah home buyers, 22,500 affordable rental units, and over 7,200 special needs units of housing.

To fund itself, the Utah Housing Corporation uses bonds and mortgage-backed securities. UHC issued its very first bond in 1977. The tax law was much simpler back then. In the beginning, it used bonds to finance mostly multi-family units. The program now works more with single family housing. Half of the mortgage loans used to be new homes. Now most loans are for existing homes. Before 1995 the servicing of loans was outsourced to a third party, after 1995 UHC started servicing their own loans. Until 2013, they only used FHA loans, but now they use conventional loans as well.

This program has done well over the years in receiving funding to help lower income families. The Low-Income Housing Tax Credit (LIHTC) was added to TRA86 to provide some balance and encourage investment in multifamily housing for those in need of affordable rental housing options. Over the subsequent 20 years, it has become an extremely effective tool for developing affordable rental housing, but less efficient economically when compared to programmatic approaches. The LIHTC program has helped meet a critical affordable housing shortage by stimulating the production or rehabilitation of nearly 2.4 million affordable homes in Utah since 1986. This helped encourage more people to buy a house and to give the UHC more options to assist them.

=== 2008 housing market crash ===
When the housing market crashed in 2008, tax-exempt bonds switched places with taxable bonds and sold at a higher price. This made it impossible for the corporation to issue more bonds to finance mortgage loans. UHC then switched to a different business model by copying the mortgage bankers. Instead of issuing bonds and using the cash to create a mortgage loan, UHC now borrows the cash (from their own cash reserves) to create mortgage loans, then bundles multiple mortgage loans together and sells them as mortgage-backed securities in order to get their money back and then lend it out again which creates a recurring source of revenue. UHC also offers a down payment assistance loans to help buyers without a down payment. In 2012, Governor Herbert helped announce two new loans to help fulfill Utah Housing’s mission, one of which is a loan that offers no mortgage insurance to help keep payments lower for borrowers.

== See also ==
- Department of Housing and Urban Development
- Low income housing
