= John B. Arrington =

American politician (1919–2001)

John B. "Jack" Arrington (August 30, 1919 – March 29, 2001) was an American politician.

Born in Independence, Missouri, Arrington went to Ogden High School in Ogden, Utah and to Weber State University. He served in the United States Army during World War II and served in the Utah National Guard, Army Reserves and Air Reserves. Arrington was a production controller at the Hill Air Force Base. Arrington served on the Ogden City Council for ten years and was a Democrat. Then from 1979 to 1999, he served in the Utah House of Representatives. Arrington died in Ogden, Utah.
