= Jeremy Peterson (politician) =

American politician

Member of the Utah House of Representatives from the 9th district
- In office January 1, 2011 – December 31, 2018
- Preceded by: Neil Hansen
- Succeeded by: Cal Musselman

Personal details
- Party: Republican
- Education: Weber State University
- Website: petersonfornine.com

Jeremy A. Peterson is an American politician and a former Republican member of the Utah House of Representatives representing District 9. Peterson lives in Ogden, Utah, with his wife, Kim, and their four children. He currently works as a real estate broker with Vesta Real Estate.

== Education ==
Peterson earned his BS in marketing from Weber State University.

== Political career ==
Peterson was first elected to the House of Representatives on November 2, 2010.

During the 2016 legislative session, Peterson served on the Business, Economic Development, and Labor Appropriations Subcommittee, the House Law Enforcement and Criminal Justice Committee, and the House Revenue and Taxation Committee.

== 2016 sponsored legislation ==
| Bill Number | Bill Title | Status |
|---|---|---|
| HB104S01 | Property Taxation Amendments | Governor Signed - 3/21/2016 |
| HB0162S01 | Motion Picture Incentive Amendments | Governor Signed - 3/18/2016 |
| HB170S01 | Medical Care Savings Account Tax Credit Repeal | Governor Signed - 3/25/2016 |
| HB310S03 | Tax CreditReview Amendments | Bill Failed Review - Returned to the House - 3/18/2016 |
| HB0327 | Energy Tax Credit Amendments | House/ filed - 3/10/2016 |
| HB0413 | Falconry Amendments | House/ filed - 3/10/2016 |
| HB441S01 | Child Placement Amendments | House/ filed - 3/10/2016 |

Peterson did not floor sponsor any bills during the 2016 Legislative Session.

== Elections ==
- 2014: Peterson was unopposed in the Republican convention and faced Democrat Steve Olsen in the 2014 general election. Peterson won with 2,273 votes (56.9%) to Olsen's 1,721 votes (43.1%).
- 2012: Peterson and former Democratic Representative Neil Hansen both won their nominations, setting up their third contest; Peterson won the November 6, 2012 general election with 5,079 votes (60.1%) against former Representative Hansen.
- 2010: Peterson and Representative Hansen both won their nominations, setting up a rematch of their 2008 contest; Peterson won the November 2, 2010 general election with 1,272 votes (53.2%) against Representative Hansen.
- 2008: To challenge District 9 incumbent Democratic Representative Neil Hansen, Peterson was selected from two candidates by the Republican convention and but lost the November 4, 2008 general election to Representative Hansen.
