= 2016 Utah elections =

The 2016 Utah general elections were held in the U.S. state of Utah on November 8, 2016. Utah's governor and lieutenant governor, attorney general, auditor, and treasurer were elected, as well as one of Utah's U.S. Senate seats and all four seats in the United States House of Representatives, fifteen Utah Senate seats and all of the Utah House of Representatives seats. Primary elections were held on June 28, 2016.

== Federal offices ==
=== U.S. Senate ===
Incumbent Republican senator Mike Lee was re-elected to a second term.

Misty Snow won the Democratic nomination, and became the first transgender woman in the history of the United States to become a major party's nominee for the Senate.

=== U.S. House of Representatives ===
All of Utah's four seats in the United States House of Representatives were up for election in November.

== State offices ==
=== Executive ===
==== Governor and lieutenant governor ====
Incumbent Republican governor Gary Herbert was re-elected to a third term in office. Spencer Cox was Herbert's running mate.

Michael Weinholtz, former chairman and CEO of CHG Healthcare Services, ran as a Democrat. Kim Bowman, division manager at University of Utah Health Sciences, is Weinholtz's running mate.

Gary Herbert

Individuals

- Mike Leavitt, former governor of Utah
- Ted Cruz, U.S. senator from Texas
- Mitt Romney, 2012 Republican presidential nominee

Organizations

- Utah Fraternal Order of Police
Michael Weinholtz

Organizations

- Equality Utah PAC

=== Administrative ===
==== Attorney general ====
===== Candidates =====
- Sean Reyes, incumbent (R)
- Jon Harper, private practice lawyer (D)
- Andrew McCullough, private practice lawyer (L)
- Michael Isbell, private practice lawyer (IAP)
Sean Reyes

Individuals

- Harris Simmons, president and CEO of Zions Bancorporation
- David Simmons, CEO of Simmons Media Group
- Robert G. Pedersen II, chairman of the board and CEO of ZAGG
- Ken Murdock, founder of Nature's Way
- Dave Brown, president, First Utah Bank
- Brett Tolman, former United States attorney for District of Utah

Organizations

- Utah Fraternal Order of Police
Jon Harper

Individuals

- Frank Layden, former Utah Jazz head coach

Results by county Reyes: 40–50%; 50–60%; 60–70%; 70–80%; 80–90%; Harper: 40–50%

General election results
Party	Candidate	Votes	%
Republican	Sean Reyes	719,064	65.4%
Democratic	Jon Harper	275,571	25.1%
Libertarian	Andrew McCullough	73,975	6.7%
Independent American	Michael Isbell	30,687	2.8%
Total votes		1,099,297	100.0%

==== Auditor ====
2016 Utah State Auditor election
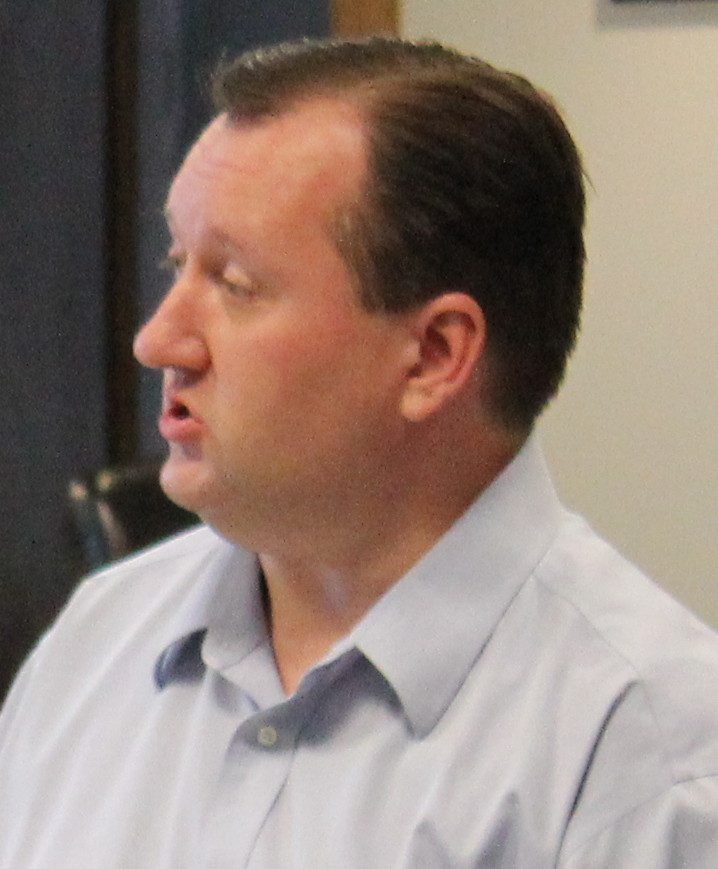

Nominee	John Dougall	Mike Mitchell	Jared Green
Party	Republican	Democratic	Independent American
Popular vote	679,675	329,625	65,692
Percentage	63.2%	30.7%	6.1%
- Dougall: 40–50% 50–60% 60–70% 70–80% 80–90% Mitchell: 50–60%
State Auditor before election
John Dougall
Republican
Elected State Auditor
John Dougall
Republican

===== Candidates =====
- John Dougall, incumbent (R)
- Mike Mitchell, accountant (D)
- Jared Green, FedEx employee (IAP)

General election results
Party	Candidate	Votes	%
Republican	John Dougall	679,675	63.2%
Democratic	Mike Mitchell	329,625	30.7%
Independent American Party	Jared Green	65,692	6.1%
Total votes		1,074,992	100.0%

==== Treasurer ====
2016 Utah State Treasurer election
Nominee	David Damschen	Neil Hansen	Richard Proctor
Party	Republican	Democratic	Constitution
Popular vote	652,275	337,997	75,365
Percentage	61.2%	31.7%	7.1%
- Damschen: 40–50% 50–60% 60–70% 70–80% 80–90% Hansen: 50–60%
State Treasurer before election
David Damschen
Republican
Elected State Treasurer
David Damschen
Republican

===== Candidates =====
- David Damschen, incumbent (R)
- Neil Hansen, former state representative (D)
- Richard Proctor, retired economist (C)

General election results
Party	Candidate	Votes	%
Republican	David Damschen	652,275	61.2%
Democratic	Neil Hansen	337,997	31.7%
Constitution	Richard Proctor	75,365	7.1%
Total votes		1,066,087	100.0%

=== Legislative ===
==== Utah State Senate ====
Fifteen Utah State Senate seats were filled in 2016.

Affiliation	Party (Shading indicates majority caucus)			Total	
Affiliation	Republican	Democratic	Libertarian	Total	Vacant
Before 2016 elections	23	5	1	29	0
Latest voting share	79%	17%	3%		
After 2016 elections	24	5	0	29	0
New voting share	83%	17%	0%		

==== Utah House of Representatives ====
All 75 seats in the Utah House of Representatives were filled in 2016.

Affiliation	Party (Shading indicates majority caucus)		Total	
Affiliation	Republican	Democratic	Total	Vacant
Before 2016 elections	63	12	75	0
Latest voting share	84%	16%		
After 2016 elections	62	13	75	0
New voting share	83%	17%		
