= Marlo Oaks =

American investment banker and government official

26th Treasurer of Utah
- Incumbent
- Assumed office June 29, 2021
- Governor: Spencer Cox
- Preceded by: David Damschen

Personal details
- Political party: Republican
- Education: Brigham Young University (BA); University of California, Los Angeles (MBA)

Marlo M. Oaks is an American investment banker and government official serving as the Utah state treasurer. He was appointed to the position by Governor Spencer Cox on June 29, 2021 and succeeded David Damschen.

== Education ==
Oaks earned a Bachelor of Arts degree in economics and English from Brigham Young University and a Master of Business Administration from the UCLA Anderson School of Management.

== Career ==
From 1996 to 2011, Oaks was the director of investments at the Farmers Insurance Group in Los Angeles. From 2011 to 2013, he was the director of investment at Intermountain Healthcare in Salt Lake City. He was then a senior advisor at Peace Field, a professional services provider. He became the managing director of Crewe Capital in 2017. In 2021, Oaks was selected to serve as Utah state treasurer, succeeding David Damschen. Oaks was reelected in 2022.

Oaks is a member of the Republican Party.

Political offices
Preceded by Kirt Slaugh; Acting	Treasurer of Utah; 2021–present	Incumbent
