= Derek Brown (politician) =

American politician (born 1971)

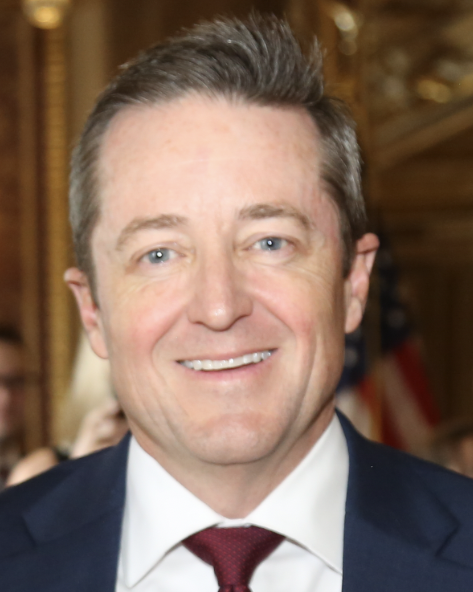

22nd Attorney General of Utah
- Incumbent
- Assumed office January 6, 2025
- Governor: Spencer Cox
- Preceded by: Sean Reyes

Chair of the Utah Republican Party
- In office May 4, 2019 – May 1, 2021
- Preceded by: Rob Anderson
- Succeeded by: Carson Jorgensen

Member of the Utah House of Representatives from the 49th district
- In office January 27, 2011 – January 2, 2014
- Preceded by: Jay Seegmiller
- Succeeded by: Robert Spendlove

Personal details
- Born: Derek Edwin Brown; May 26, 1971 (age 55) Utah, U.S.
- Party: Republican
- Spouse: Emilie De Azevedo
- Children: 4
- Education: Brigham Young University, Utah (BA); Pepperdine University (JD)
- Website: Official website

Derek Edwin Brown (born May 26, 1971) is an American lawyer and politician who is serving as the 22nd attorney general of Utah since 2025. A member of the Republican Party, he served as a member of the Utah House of Representatives from his election in 2010 until his departure in 2014. He represented House District 49, which constitutes the Sandy and Cottonwood Heights areas. Brown left the legislature in January 2014, when he was selected by U.S. Senator Mike Lee to be his deputy chief of staff and state director. He has served as legal counsel to Sens. Bob Bennett and Orrin Hatch, and also practiced law at two international law firms.

== Biography ==
Brown is married to Emilie de Azevedo Brown, the daughter of Lex de Azevedo. The couple has four children and lives in Cottonwood Heights, Utah.

Brown graduated from Brigham Young University in 1996 with his B.A. in English and minor degrees in music and business management. He and his wife were members of BYU's touring performance group, the Young Ambassadors. In 2000, he graduated from Pepperdine University School of Law, where he was editor-in-chief of the Pepperdine Law Review. While at Pepperdine, he also received the First Place Advocate award in the school's Dalsimer Moot Court Competition, as well as the annual Sorenson Writing Award for a published legal comment he wrote on tort law.

After law school, he was a law clerk to Justice Ruggero J. Aldisert of the United States Court of Appeals for the Third Circuit, based in Philadelphia. Following his time with the U.S. Court of Appeals, he practiced law in Washington, D.C., with the international law firm Sidley & Austin.

Brown left Sidley & Austin when U.S. Senator Bob Bennett asked him to serve as his chief counsel in Washington, D.C. Several years later, Brown relocated his family to his home state of Utah, where he served as counsel to U.S. Senator Orrin Hatch. Brown is an attorney licensed in the state of Utah.

Brown was elected in November 2010 to the Utah House of Representatives with 55.87% of the vote, defeating Democratic incumbent Jay Seegmiller. Brown won his election in 2012 with approximately 60% of the vote. He served in the House until accepting a position as Deputy Chief of Staff for United States Senator Mike Lee in 2014, where he managed policy and legal matters for the Senator, and served as the Utah State Director. After Senator Lee was re-elected in late 2016, Brown returned to government work. He joined Utah Government Relations Firm Lincoln Hill Partners, where he represented technology and healthcare clients. When Brown began his campaign for Attorney General, he stopped his government relations work.

Brown has also taught as an adjunct professor at Brigham Young University since 2007, where he teaches courses in communications law and ethics.

In 2019, Brown was elected as Chairman of the Utah Republican Party, a position in which he served until his term expired in 2021. Under Brown's leadership, the Utah Republican Party paid off its debt and successfully flipped a congressional seat with Rep. Burgess Owens beating former Democratic Rep. Ben McAdams.

Brown announced on November 16, 2023 that he had formed an exploratory committee to consider running as the Republican nominee for Utah Attorney General. Brown's exploratory committee was chaired by former Utah Governor Gary Herbert.

Brown became the Republican nominee for the 2024 Utah Attorney General election. During his campaign, he promised to make the Office of the Attorney General more transparent by saying he would release his calendar weekly to the press. In addition to transparency and building trust, he campaigned on making Utah a safer place to live and created a Law Enforcement Committee to advise him on conservative approaches to law enforcement policy. Federalism, especially reducing federal control over Utah's lands, was a key issue for Brown. He said, "It is critical that as a state, we have the ability to control it (public lands) and not individuals who are unaccountable, 1,800 miles away."

Brown won the general election on November 5, 2024.

During his first week in office, he released his calendar to the public and told the media that his goal was to make the Attorney General's Office the best law firm in the state. "We want people to know what it is we're doing," Brown told the media at a press conference the day after his inauguration on January 8. "We want to be accessible. We want people to understand what it is that the office does."

Party political offices
| Preceded by Rob Anderson | Chair of the Utah Republican Party; 2019–2021 | Succeeded by Carson Jorgensen |
Legal offices
| Preceded by Sean Reyes | Attorney General of Utah; 2025–present | Incumbent |
