= Utah State Treasurer =

State Treasurer of Utah
- Seal of the state treasurer of Utah
- Incumbent; Marlo Oaks since June 29, 2021
- Style: The Honorable
- Term length: Four years
- Inaugural holder: James Chipman; 1896
- Formation: Utah Constitution
- Website: treasurer.utah.gov

The Utah state treasurer acts as the head banker for the state of Utah, handling deposits, withdrawals, redemptions of state warrants, and investments of state funds. The position was created in 1896 when Utah became a state. The Constitution of Utah established the Office of the State Treasurer to be elected by popular vote.

The current state treasurer is Marlo Oaks who was appointed by Governor Spencer Cox after Treasurer David Damschen resigned on April 30, 2021 to lead the Utah Housing Corporation.

== Past treasurers ==
#	Name	Term	Party
1	James Chipman	1896–1901	
2	John DeGrey Dixon	1901–1905	
3	James Christiansen	1905–1909	Republican
4	David Mattson	1909–1913	Republican
5	Jesse Jewkes	1913–1917	Republican
6	Daniel O. Larson	1917–1921	Democratic
7	William D. Sutton	1921–1925	Republican
8	John Walker	1925–1929	Republican
9	A. Edsel Christensen	1929–1934	Republican
10	Enos Hoge	1934	
11	Joseph Ririe	1934–1937	Democratic
12	Reece M. Reese	1937–1941	Democratic
13	Oliver G. Ellis	1941–1945	Democratic
14	Reece M. Reese	1945–1949	Democratic
15	Ferrell H. Adams	1949–1953	Democratic
16	Sid Lambourne	1953–1957	Republican
17	Sherman J. Preece	1957–1961	Republican
18	Sharp M. Larsen	1961–1965	Democratic
19	Linn C. Baker	1965–1969	Democratic
20	Golden L. Allen	1969–1973	Republican
21	David L. Duncan	1973–1977	Democratic
22	Linn C. Baker	1977–1981	Republican
23	Edward T. Alter	1981–2009	Republican
24	Richard K. Ellis	2009–2015	Republican
25	David Damschen	2015–2021	Republican
26	Marlo Oaks	2021–	Republican
