= David Damschen =

American politician

25th Treasurer of Utah
- In office December 11, 2015 – April 30, 2021
- Governor: Gary Herbert; Spencer Cox
- Preceded by: Richard Ellis
- Succeeded by: Kirt Slaugh (Acting)

Personal details
- Political party: Republican
- Education: University of Washington (BS)

David C. Damschen is an American politician from the state of Utah. A member of the Republican Party, Damschen was the Utah State Treasurer.

Damschen worked for American West Bank and U.S. Bank, and then became the chief deputy to Richard Ellis, the Utah State Treasurer, in 2009. When Ellis resigned in 2015, Governor Gary Herbert appointed Damschen to succeed Ellis. He was sworn into office in January 2016. Damschen defeated Neil Hansen in the 2016 election to a full term. In 2018, he was voted senior vice president of the National Association of State Treasurers. Damschen won reelection to a second full term in November 2020.

In April 2021, Damschen announced his resignation, effective April 30, to become President and CEO of the Utah Housing Corporation.

Political offices
Preceded by Richard Ellis	Treasurer of Utah; 2015–2021	Succeeded by Kirt Slaugh; Acting
