= 2016 United States Senate election in Utah =

- November 8, 2016
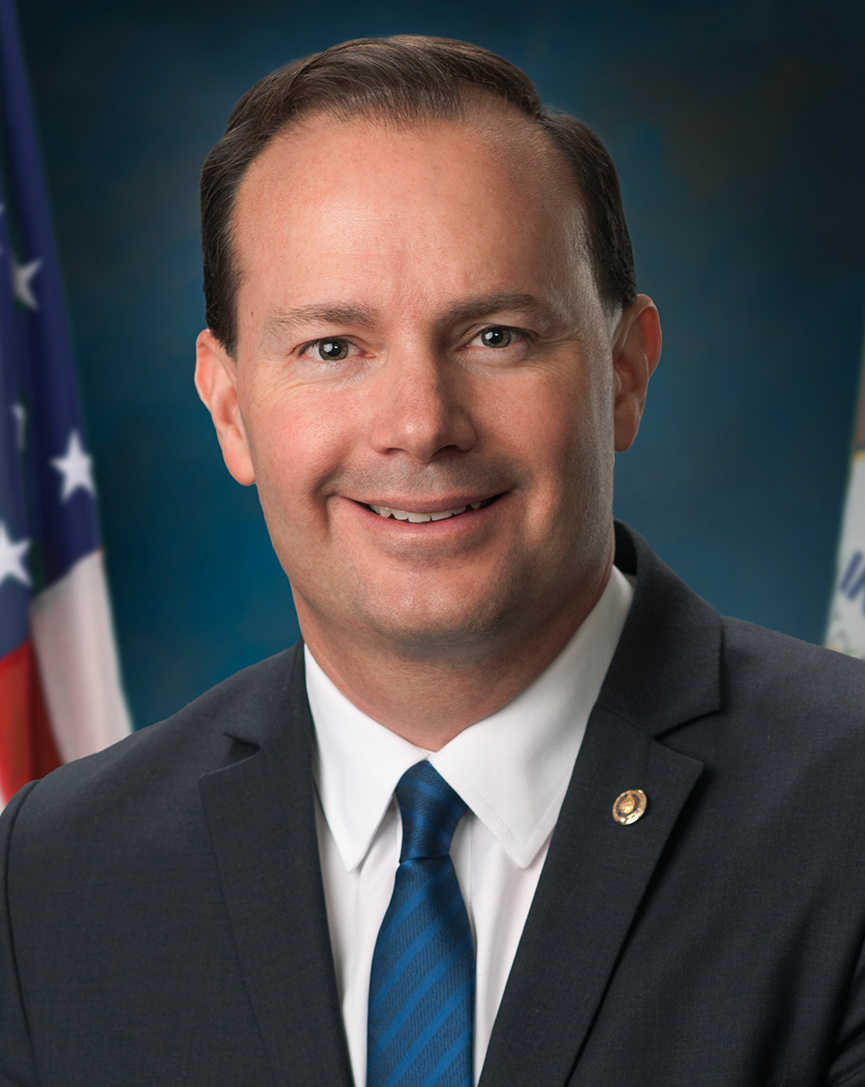

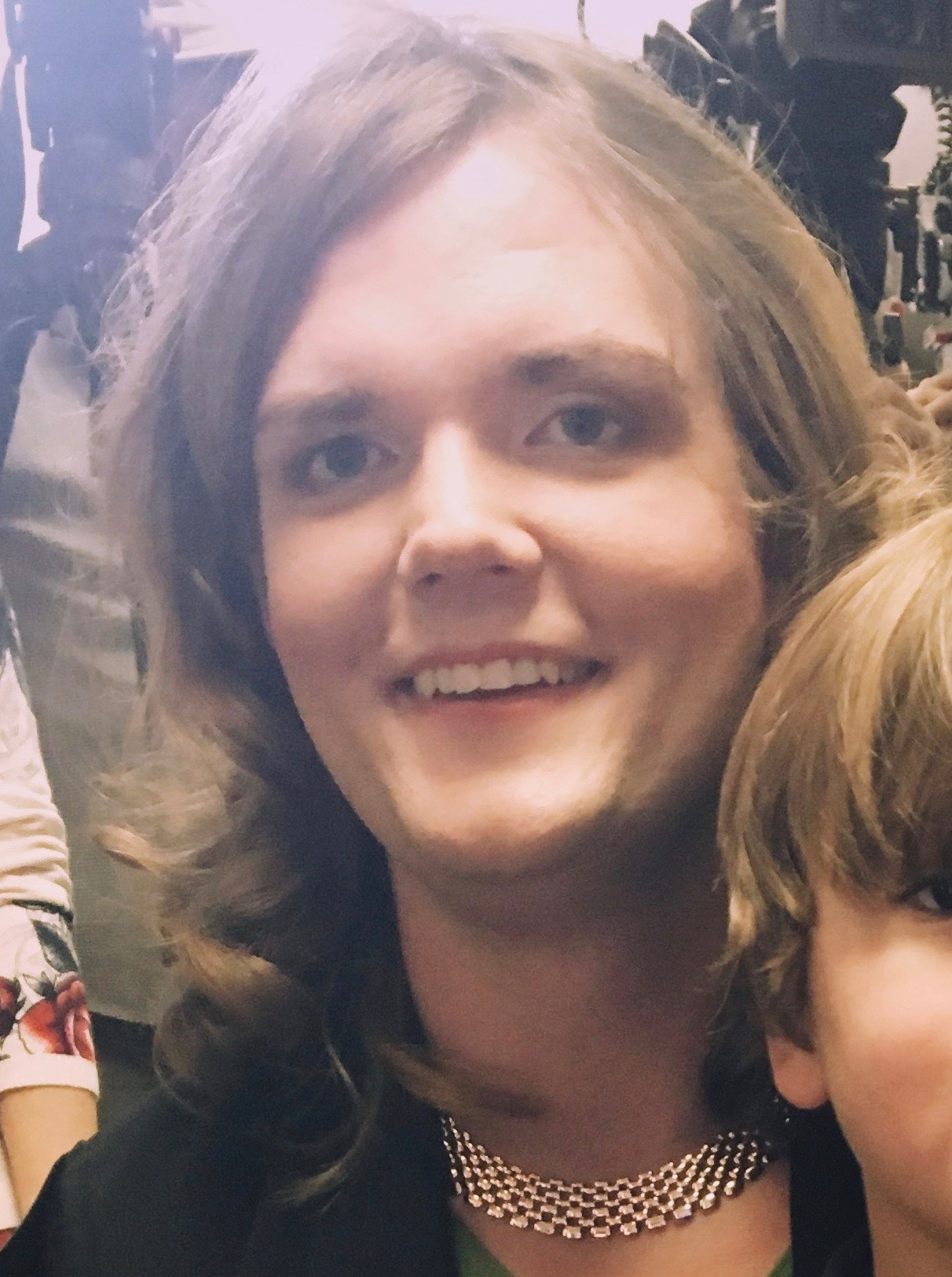
Nominee	Mike Lee	Misty Snow
Party	Republican	Democratic
Popular vote	760,241	301,860
Percentage	68.15%	27.06%
- Lee: 40–50% 50–60% 60–70% 70–80% 80–90% >90% Snow: 40–50% 50–60% 60–70% 70–80% 80–90% >90% Tie: 40–50% 50% No data
U.S. senator before election
Mike Lee
Republican
Elected U.S. Senator
Mike Lee
Republican

The 2016 United States Senate election in Utah took place on November 8, 2016, to elect a member of the United States Senate to represent the State of Utah, concurrently with the 2016 U.S. presidential election, as well as other elections to the United States Senate in other states and elections to the United States House of Representatives and various state and local elections.

The primaries took place on June 28. Misty Snow won the Democratic nomination, becoming the first transgender woman in the history of the United States to become a major party's nominee for the Senate.

Incumbent Republican Senator Mike Lee won re-election to a second term in office.

== Republican primary ==
It was thought that Lee, a Tea Party Republican, might face a primary challenge from a member of the more establishment wing of the Party following his role in the unpopular 2013 federal government shutdown, which caused his approval ratings to drop precipitously. However, since that time, his approval ratings rose significantly.

Changes to Utah's primary system could adversely affect Lee's chances at renomination. Presently, Utah political parties hold conventions, where delegates attend and vote for candidates. Only if a candidate fails to gain at least 60% of the vote do the top two finishers proceed to a statewide primary election. In 2010, incumbent senator Bob Bennett finished third at the convention behind Lee and businessman Tim Bridgewater and was eliminated, with Lee defeating Bridgewater in the subsequent primary election. Lee's approval rating is much higher among the smaller group of more conservative convention delegates and a recent change in the law, backed by the group Count My Vote, allows candidates to bypass the convention by collecting signatures to advance to the primary. Thus, a less conservative challenger could challenge Lee in the primary, appealing to more moderate Republican and unaffiliated voters, who could participate in the primary. The constitutionality of the changes have been challenged in court by the Utah Republican Party.

One possible challenger to Lee was former governor of Utah and former United States Secretary of Health and Human Services Mike Leavitt, one of the founders of Count My Vote, though he eventually denied interest in running. An effort to draft Huntsman Sr.'s son, Jon Huntsman Jr., the former governor of Utah, former United States Ambassador to China under Barack Obama and a candidate for President in 2012, was unsuccessful, with Huntsman ruling out a run against Lee.

=== Candidates ===
==== Declared ====
- Mike Lee, incumbent senator

==== Declined ====
- Lane Beattie, president and CEO of the Salt Lake Chamber of Commerce and former president of the Utah State Senate
- A. Scott Anderson, president and CEO of Zions Bank
- Jason Chaffetz, U.S. Representative
- Spencer Cox, Lieutenant Governor of Utah
- Alex Dunn, president of Vivint
- Jon Huntsman, Jr., former governor of Utah, former United States Ambassador to China under Barack Obama and candidate for President in 2012
- Kirk Jowers, director of the University of Utah Hinckley Institute of Politics
- Mike Leavitt, former governor of Utah and former United States Secretary of Health and Human Services
- Dan Liljenquist, former state senator and candidate for the U.S. Senate in 2012
- Aaron Osmond, state senator
- Sean Reyes, Attorney General of Utah
- Josh Romney, real estate developer and son of Mitt Romney
- Chris Stewart, U.S. Representative
- Thomas Wright, former chairman of the Utah Republican Party

=== Endorsements ===
Mike Lee

Individuals

- A. Scott Anderson, President and CEO of Zions Bank
- Carly Fiorina, former CEO of Hewlett-Packard, 2010 Republican nominee for Senate in California, and 2016 presidential candidate

Organizations

- American Conservative Union
- Club for Growth
- Senate Conservatives Fund

== Democratic primary ==
=== Candidates ===
Jonathan Swinton was the first Democrat to announce his candidacy for U.S. Senate, filing on August 10. The other candidates filing for the nomination were Craig Oliver, Jade Tuan Quoc Vo, and Misty K. Snow. Snow filed on March 3. Oliver withdrew before the state convention. Vo was eliminated in the first round of balloting.

Swinton faced criticism at the April 23 state convention from delegates who said he was pro-life, a criticism based primarily on Swinton's September 26 op-ed in the Salt Lake Tribune in which he describes himself as a "conservative Democrat" and "pro-life" while also calling for "a full investigation of Planned Parenthood." Swinton tried unsuccessfully to avoid discussing his views on abortion at the state convention.

After two rounds of balloting, neither Snow nor Swinton received the 60% of the vote they needed to secure the Democratic nomination. As a result, the two faced off in a June 28 primary, which Snow won.

==== Declared ====
- Misty K. Snow, cashier
- Jonathan Swinton, marriage and family therapist

==== Eliminated at Convention ====
- Jade Tuan Quoc Vo

==== Withdrawn ====
- Craig Oliver

==== Declined ====
- Jim Matheson, former U.S. Representative
- Ben McAdams, Mayor of Salt Lake County and former state senator
- Doug Owens, attorney, son of former Congressman Wayne Owens, and nominee for Utah's 4th congressional district in 2014 (running for UT-04)

===== Polling =====
A Dan Jones & Associates poll for UtahPolicy.com showed Snow leading with Democratic voters 33% to Swinton's 20%, as well as with independent voters, 23% to Swinton's 10%. The majority of the voters that were surveyed were undecided. The survey was administered from May 2–10, 2016 to 588 registered voters with a margin of error of +/- 4.04%.

=== Primary results ===
Results by county: Snow: Snow—70–80%; Snow—60–70%; Snow—50–60%; Snow/Swinton tie: Snow/Swinton tie—50–60%; Swinton: Swinton—50–60%; Swinton—100%

Democratic primary results
Party	Candidate	Votes	%
Democratic	Misty K. Snow	28,928	59.40%
Democratic	Jonathan Swinton	19,774	40.60%
Total votes		48,702	100.00%

== Third party and independent candidates ==
- Bill Barron (Independent), candidate for the U.S. Senate in 2012 and candidate for UT-02 in 2014
- Stoney Fonua (Independent American)

== General election ==
=== Debates ===
Dates	Location	Lee	Snow	Link
October 12, 2016	Provo, Utah	Participant	Participant	

=== Predictions ===
Source	Ranking	As of
The Cook Political Report	Safe R	November 2, 2016
Sabato's Crystal Ball	Safe R	November 7, 2016
Rothenberg Political Report	Safe R	November 3, 2016
Daily Kos	Safe R	November 8, 2016
Real Clear Politics	Safe R	November 7, 2016

=== Polling ===
View source data.

Poll source	Date(s) administered	Sample size	Margin of error	Mike Lee (R)	Misty Snow (D)	Other	Undecided
SurveyMonkey	November 1–7, 2016	1,479	± 4.6%	60%	36%	—	4%
SurveyMonkey	October 31–November 6, 2016	1,428	± 4.6%	60%	36%	—	4%
CBS News/YouGov	November 3–5, 2016	762	± 4.9%	69%	23%	2%	6%
Y2 Analytics (R-Utah Republican Party)	November 1–3, 2016	500	± 4.4%	62%	22%	8%	7%
SurveyMonkey	October 28–November 3, 2016	1,327	± 4.6%	61%	35%	—	4%
Monmouth University	October 30–November 2, 2016	402	± 4.9%	61%	28%	5%	5%
SurveyMonkey	October 27–November 2, 2016	1,247	± 4.6%	61%	35%	—	4%
SurveyMonkey	October 26–November 1, 2016	1,057	± 4.6%	61%	34%	—	5%
HeatStreet/Rasmussen	October 29–31, 2016	750	± 4.0%	59%	27%	5%	7%
SurveyMonkey	October 25–31, 2016	1,078	± 4.6%	62%	34%	—	4%
HeatStreet/Rasmussen	October 14–16, 2016	750	± 4.0%	57%	25%	8%	10%
Monmouth University	October 10–12, 2016	403	± 4.9%	60%	31%	3%	6%
UtahPolicy/Dan Jones	September 1–9, 2016	605	± 4.0%	60%	23%	7%	10%
Public Policy Polling	August 19–21, 2016	1,018	± 3.1%	51%	21%	8%	20%
UtahPolicy/Dan Jones	July 18–August 4, 2016	858	± 3.3%	57%	22%	9%	12%
SurveyUSA	June 6–8, 2016	1,238	± 2.8%	51%	37%	4%	8%

Hypothetical polling

with Jonathan Swinton

Poll source	Date(s) administered	Sample size	Margin of error	Mike Lee (R)	Jonathan Swinton (D)	Other	Undecided
SurveyUSA	June 6–8, 2016	1,238	± 2.8%	50%	39%	3%	7%
UtahPolicy/Dan Jones	March 23–April 5, 2016	600	± 4.0%	54%	28%	—	18%
UtahPolicy/Dan Jones	September 8–17, 2015	604	± 4.0%	55%	25%	4%	17%

with Jim Matheson

Poll source	Date(s) administered	Sample size	Margin of error	Mike Lee (R)	Jim Matheson (D)	Other	Undecided
Public Policy Polling	August 19–21, 2016	1,018	± 3.1%	44%	37%	5%	14%
UtahPolicy/Dan Jones	March 30–April 7, 2015	601	± 4.0%	48%	42%	—	10%

with Doug Owens

Poll source	Date(s) administered	Sample size	Margin of error	Mike Lee (R)	Doug Owens (D)	Other	Undecided
UtahPolicy/Dan Jones	May 4–12, 2015	803	± 3.5%	55%	36%	—	10%

Open primary

Poll source	Date(s) administered	Sample size	Margin of error	Mike Lee (R)	Jim Matheson (D)	Ben McAdams (D)	Doug Owens (D)	Josh Romney (R)	Thomas Wright (R)	Undecided
UtahPolicy/Dan Jones	March 30–April 7, 2015	601	± 4.0%	33%	20%	5%	8%	20%	2%	12%

=== Results ===
United States Senate election in Utah, 2016
Party	Candidate	Votes	%	±%
Republican	Mike Lee (incumbent)	760,241	68.15%	+6.59%
Democratic	Misty Snow	301,860	27.06%	−5.71%
Independent American	Stoney Fonua	27,340	2.45%	N/A
Independent	Bill Barron	26,167	2.34%	N/A
Total votes		1,115,608	100.0%	N/A
Republican hold				

==== By congressional district ====
Lee won all 4 congressional districts.

District	Lee	Snow	Representative
1st	72%	23%	Rob Bishop
2nd	63%	31%	Chris Stewart
3rd	74%	22%	Jason Chaffetz
4th	63%	32%	Mia Love
