= 2016 United States House of Representatives elections in Utah =

- November 8, 2016

All 4 Utah seats to the United States House of Representatives
	Majority party	Minority party
Party	Republican	Democratic
Last election	4	0
Seats won	4	0
Seat change	Steady	Steady
Popular vote	710,635	356,287
Percentage	63.78%	31.98%
Swing	▲1.76%	▼0.44%

Republican
50–60%
60–70%
70–80%
80–90%
Democratic
40–50%
50–60%

The 2016 United States House of Representatives elections in Utah were held on November 8, 2016, to elect the four U.S. representatives from the state of Utah, one from each of the state's four congressional districts. The elections coincided with the 2016 U.S. presidential election, as well as other elections to the House of Representatives, elections to the United States Senate and various state and local elections. The primaries were held on June 28.

== District 1 ==
2016 Utah's 1st congressional district election
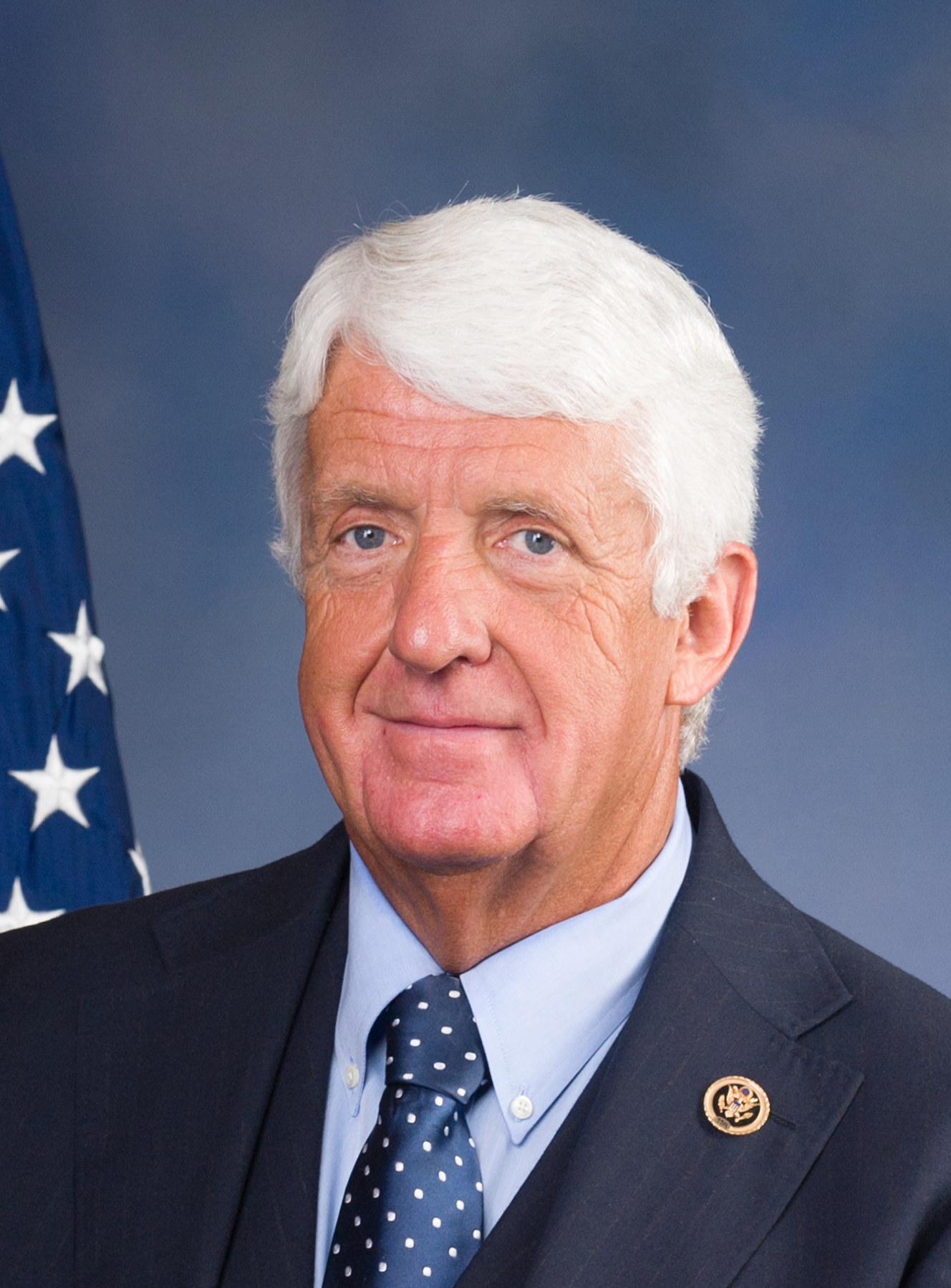

Nominee	Rob Bishop	Peter Clemens	Craig Bowden
Party	Republican	Democratic	Libertarian
Popular vote	182,928	73,381	16,296
Percentage	65.9%	26.4%	5.9%
- County results Bishop: 50–60% 60–70% 70–80% 80–90% Clemens: 50–60%
U.S. Representative before election
Rob Bishop
Republican
Elected U.S. Representative
Rob Bishop
Republican

The 1st District covers northern Utah, including the cities of Ogden and Logan. Incumbent Republican Rob Bishop, ran for re-election.

=== Republican primary ===
==== Candidates ====
===== Nominee =====
- Rob Bishop, incumbent U.S. Representative

=== Democratic primary ===
==== Candidates ====
===== Nominee =====
- Peter Clemens

=== General election ===
==== Predictions ====
Source	Ranking	As of
The Cook Political Report	Safe R	November 7, 2016
Daily Kos Elections	Safe R	November 7, 2016
Rothenberg	Safe R	November 3, 2016
Sabato's Crystal Ball	Safe R	November 7, 2016
RCP	Safe R	October 31, 2016

==== Debate ====
2016 Utah's 1st congressional district debate
No.	Date	Host	Moderator	Link	Republican	Democratic
Key: P Participant A Absent N Not invited I Invited W Withdrawn						
Key: P Participant A Absent N Not invited I Invited W Withdrawn					Rob Bishop	Peter Clemens
1	Oct. 19, 2016	Utah Debate Commission	Jennifer Napier-Pearce		P	P

==== Results ====
Bishop was re-elected with 65% of the vote.

Utah's 1st congressional district, 2016
Party	Candidate	Votes	%
Republican	Rob Bishop (incumbent)	182,928	65.9
Democratic	Peter Clemens	73,381	26.4
Libertarian	Craig Bowden	16,296	5.9
Independent	Chadwick Fairbanks III	4,850	1.8
Total votes		277,455	100.0
Republican hold			

== District 2 ==
2016 Utah's 2nd congressional district election
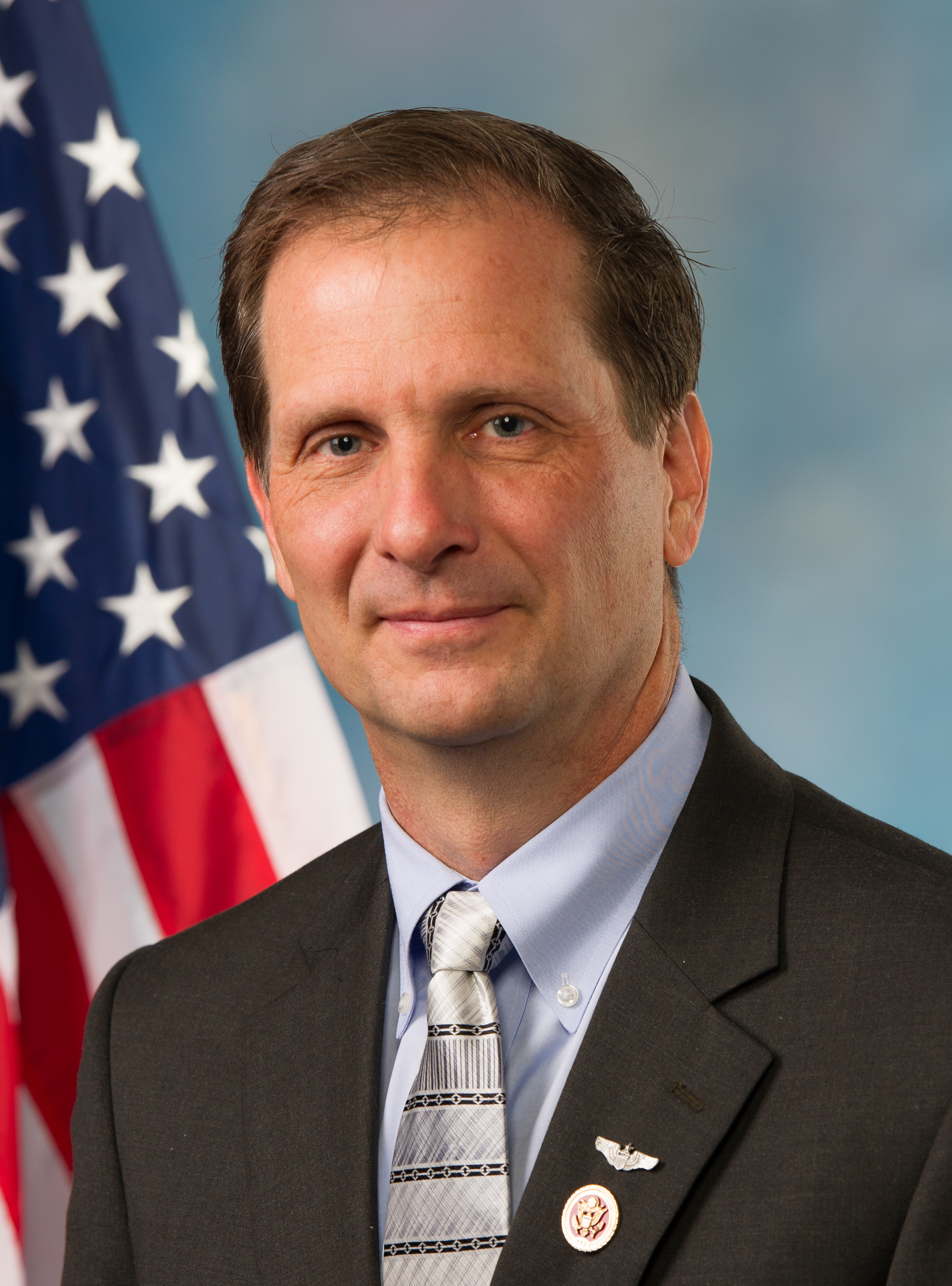

Nominee	Chris Stewart	Charlene Albarran
Party	Republican	Democratic
Popular vote	170,542	93,780
Percentage	61.6%	33.9%
- County results Stewart: 60–70% 70–80% 80–90% Albarran: 60–70%
U.S. Representative before election
Chris Stewart
Republican
Elected U.S. Representative
Chris Stewart
Republican

The 2nd District stretches from the Summit County, Utah line and goes west to the Nevada border and down through St. George. It includes parts of Davis, Salt Lake, Sanpete, and Juab Counties. Incumbent Republican Chris Stewart, who had represented the district since 2012, ran for re-election. The district has a PVI of R+18.

=== Republican primary ===
==== Candidates ====
===== Nominee =====
- Chris Stewart, incumbent U.S. Representative

=== Democratic primary ===
Democratic candidate Charlene McArthur Albarran announced her intention to run on February 1, 2016, and formally filed with the Utah Elections office on March 11, 2016.

==== Candidates ====
===== Nominee =====
- Charlene McArthur Albarran

=== General election ===
==== Predictions ====
Source	Ranking	As of
The Cook Political Report	Safe R	November 7, 2016
Daily Kos Elections	Safe R	November 7, 2016
Rothenberg	Safe R	November 3, 2016
Sabato's Crystal Ball	Safe R	November 7, 2016
RCP	Safe R	October 31, 2016

==== Debate ====
2016 Utah's 2nd congressional district debate
No.	Date	Host	Moderator	Link	Republican	Democratic
Key: P Participant A Absent N Not invited I Invited W Withdrawn						
Key: P Participant A Absent N Not invited I Invited W Withdrawn					Chris Stewart	Charlene Albarran
1	Oct. 4, 2016	Utah Debate Commission	Ken Vordoia		P	P

==== Results ====
Stewart was re-elected to his third term with 62% of the vote.

Utah's 2nd congressional district, 2016
Party	Candidate	Votes	%
Republican	Chris Stewart (incumbent)	170,542	61.6
Democratic	Charlene Albarran	93,780	33.9
Constitution	Paul J. McCollaum Jr.	12,519	4.5
Total votes		276,841	100.0
Republican hold			

== District 3 ==
2016 Utah's 3rd congressional district election
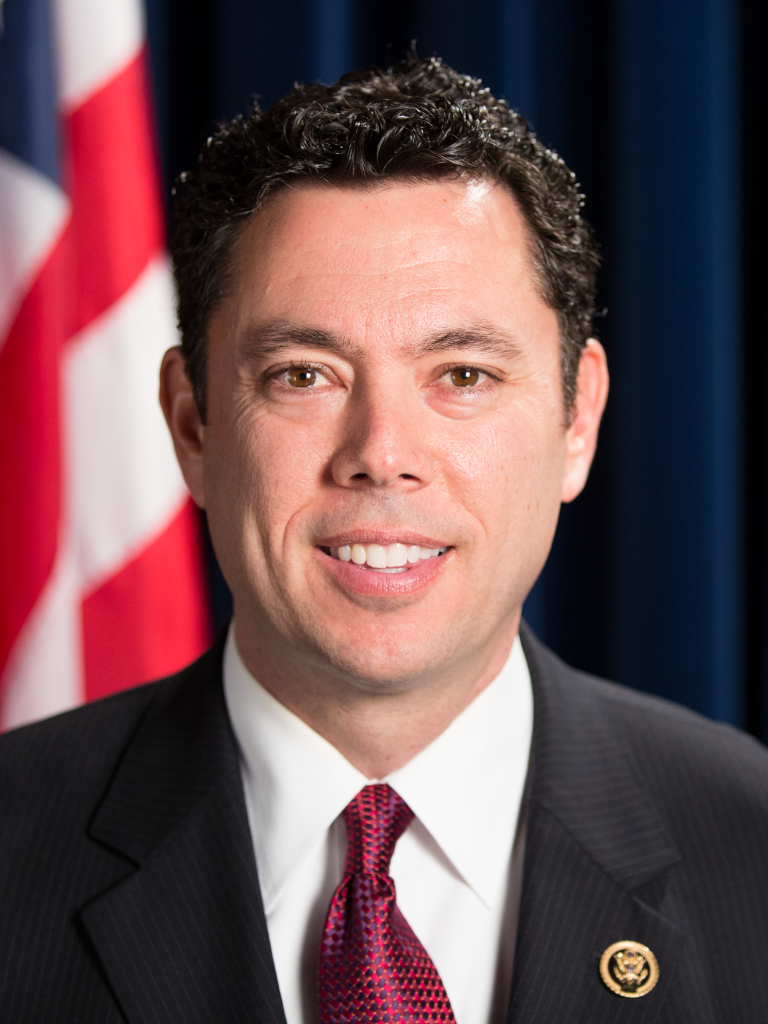

Nominee	Jason Chaffetz	Stephen Tryon
Party	Republican	Democratic
Popular vote	209,589	75,716
Percentage	73.5%	26.5%
- County results Chaffetz: 50–60% 60–70% 70–80% 80–90%
U.S. Representative before election
Jason Chaffetz
Republican
Elected U.S. Representative
Jason Chaffetz
Republican

The 3rd district is located in southern and eastern Utah and includes the cities of Orem and Provo. Incumbent Republican Jason Chaffetz, who had represented the district since 2009, ran for re-election. He was re-elected with 72% of the vote in 2014 and the district has a PVI of R+28.

=== Republican primary ===
==== Candidates ====
===== Nominee =====
- Jason Chaffetz, incumbent U.S. Representative

===== Eliminated in primary =====
- Chia-Chi Teng

==== Results ====
Republican primary results
Party	Candidate	Votes	%
Republican	Jason Chaffetz (incumbent)	47,439	78.6
Republican	Chia-Chi Teng	12,922	21.4
Total votes		60,361	100.0

=== Democratic primary ===
==== Candidates ====
===== Nominee =====
- Stephen Tryon

=== General election ===
==== Predictions ====
Source	Ranking	As of
The Cook Political Report	Safe R	November 7, 2016
Daily Kos Elections	Safe R	November 7, 2016
Rothenberg	Safe R	November 3, 2016
Sabato's Crystal Ball	Safe R	November 7, 2016
RCP	Safe R	October 31, 2016

==== Debate ====
2016 Utah's 3rd congressional district debate
No.	Date	Host	Moderator	Link	Republican	Democratic
Key: P Participant A Absent N Not invited I Invited W Withdrawn						
Key: P Participant A Absent N Not invited I Invited W Withdrawn					Jason Chaffetz	Stephen Tryon
1	Oct. 28, 2016	Utah Debate Commission	David Magleby		P	P

==== Results ====
Chaffetz won re-election in 2016 with 74% of the vote.

Utah's 3rd congressional district, 2016
Party	Candidate	Votes	%
Republican	Jason Chaffetz (incumbent)	209,589	73.5
Democratic	Stephen P. Tryon	75,716	26.5
Total votes		285,305	100.0
Republican hold			

== District 4 ==
2016 Utah's 4th congressional district election
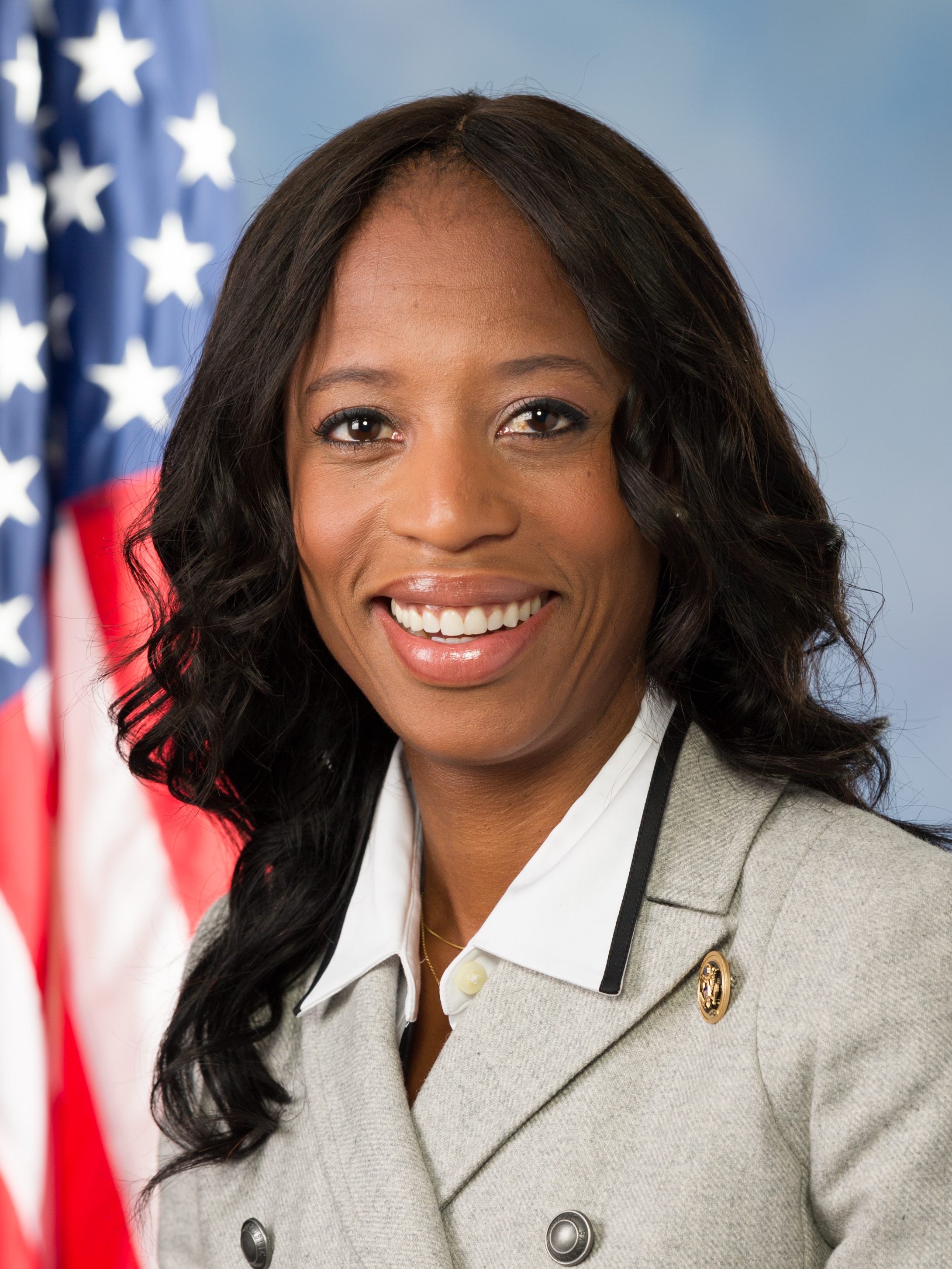

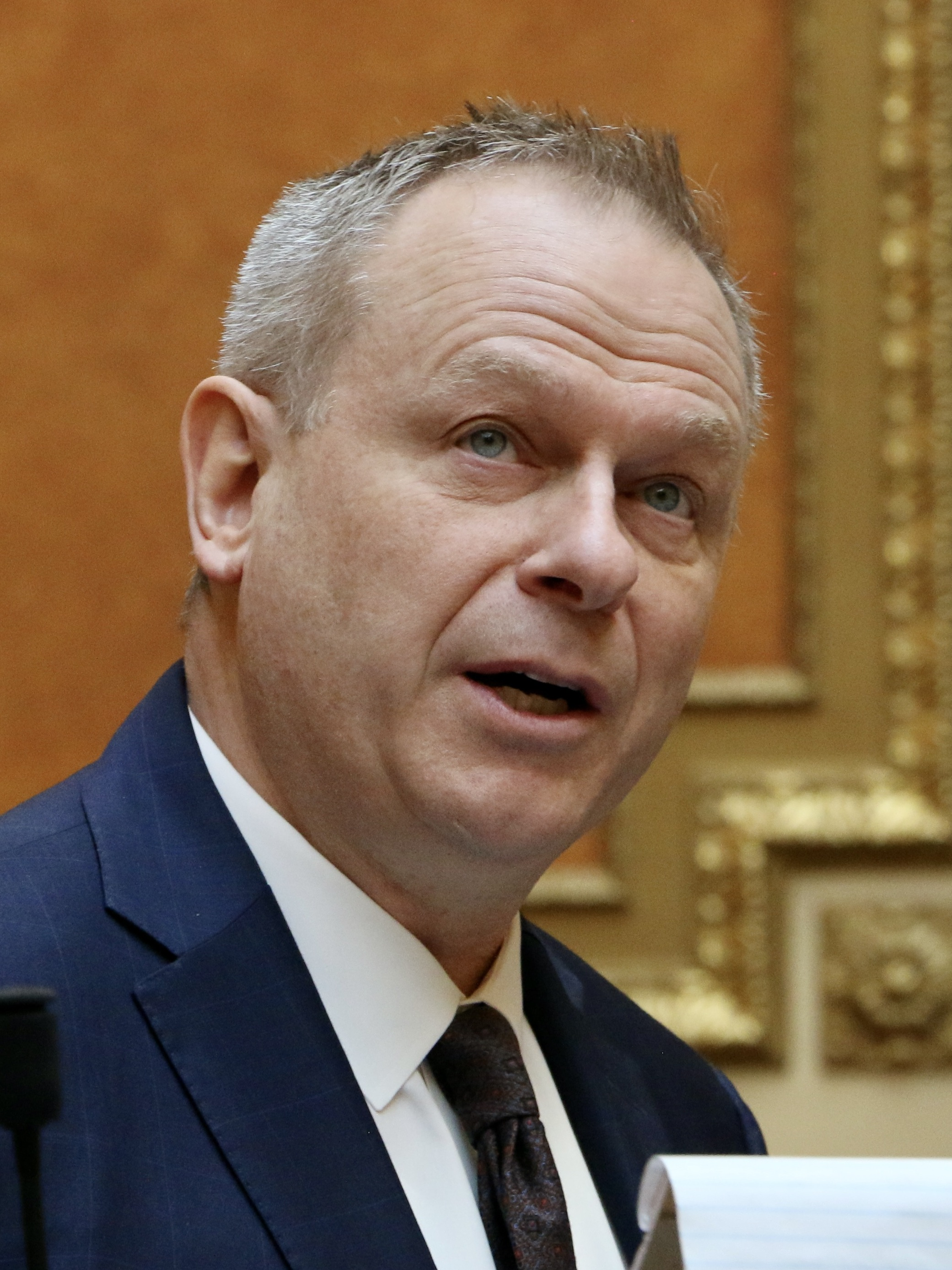
Nominee	Mia Love	Doug Owens
Party	Republican	Democratic
Popular vote	147,597	113,413
Percentage	53.8%	41.3%
- County results Love: 40–50% 70–80%
U.S. Representative before election
Mia Love
Republican
Elected U.S. Representative
Mia Love
Republican

The 4th district is located in northern-central Utah and includes parts of Salt Lake, Utah, Juab, and Sanpete Counties. Incumbent Republican Mia Love, who had represented the district since 2015, ran for re-election. She was elected with 50% of the vote in 2014 and the district has a PVI of R+16.

=== Republican primary ===
==== Candidates ====
===== Nominee =====
- Mia Love, incumbent U.S. Representative

=== Democratic primary ===
==== Candidates ====
===== Nominee =====
- Doug Owens, attorney, son of former representative Wayne Owens and nominee for this seat in 2014

=== General election ===
==== Debate ====
2016 Utah's 4th congressional district debate
No.	Date	Host	Moderator	Link	Republican	Democratic
Key: P Participant A Absent N Not invited I Invited W Withdrawn						
Key: P Participant A Absent N Not invited I Invited W Withdrawn					Mia Love	Doug Owens
1	Oct. 10, 2016	Utah Debate Commission	Ken Vordoia		P	P

==== Endorsements ====
Doug Owens (D)

Organizations

- Democratic Congressional Campaign Committee "Red to Blue" Program

==== Polling ====
Poll source	Date(s) administered	Sample size	Margin of error	Mia Love (R)	Doug Owens (D)	Collin Simonsen (C)	Undecided
Dan Jones & Associates	October 12–22, 2016	404	± 4.9%	51%	38%	4%	7%
ALG Research (D-Owens)	October 11–13, 2016	500	± 4.4%	50%	40%	6%	4%
University of Utah	September 12–19, 2016	409	± 4.8%	53%	35%	3%	8%
Dan Jones & Associates	July 18–August 8, 2016	405	± 4.9%	51%	38%	4%	7%
Y2 Analytics (R-Love)	July 7–12, 2016	300	± 5.7%	51%	36%	—	8%
SurveyUSA	June 2–8, 2016	573	± 4.2%	45%	51%	1%	3%

==== Predictions ====
Source	Ranking	As of
The Cook Political Report	Lean R	November 7, 2016
Daily Kos Elections	Likely R	November 7, 2016
Rothenberg	Likely R	November 3, 2016
Sabato's Crystal Ball	Lean R	November 7, 2016
RCP	Tossup	October 31, 2016

==== Results ====
Love won re-election with 53% of the vote.

Utah's 4th congressional district, 2016
Party	Candidate	Votes	%
Republican	Mia Love (incumbent)	147,597	53.8
Democratic	Doug Owens	113,413	41.3
Constitution	Collin R. Simonsen	13,559	4.9
Total votes		274,569	100.0
Republican hold			
