= 1984 Utah gubernatorial election =

- November 6, 1984
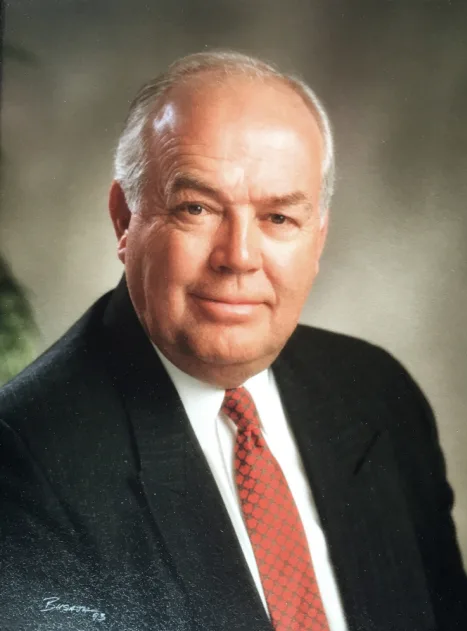

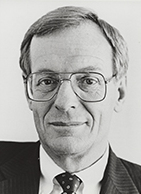
Nominee	Norman H. Bangerter	Wayne Owens
Party	Republican	Democratic
Popular vote	351,792	275,669
Percentage	55.87%	43.78%
- County results Bangerter: 50–60% 60–70% 70–80% Owens: 50–60% 60–70%
Governor before election
Scott M. Matheson
Democratic
Elected Governor
Norman H. Bangerter
Republican

The 1984 Utah gubernatorial election was held on November 6, 1984. Republican nominee Norman H. Bangerter defeated Democratic nominee Wayne Owens with 55.87% of the vote, becoming Utah's first Republican governor in 20 years.

== Background ==
Up until 1984, the Democratic Party had held the Utah Governors seat for twenty years since Cal Rampton first won in 1964. Popular Democratic Governor Scott Matheson declined to seek a third time, allowing for an open Democratic primary, in which former congressman Wayne Owens won. Kem Gardner, the chairman of the State Board of Regents, a wealthy real estate developer, and Owen's main opponent in the primary, routinely attacked Owens as being too liberal, a label Owens denied. Despite have the backing of party leadership and their endorsements, Gardner lost the primary by 24 points. In the Republican primary, Utah House Speaker Norman Bangerter faced off against congressman Dan Marriott, and won by nearly 13 points. Bangerter stated that his win was due to groundwork laid out by his legislative colleagues, as well as believing that Utahan's were "..ready for that experience and maybe a new face." Marriott blamed low turnout and "democratic crossover" for his loss, as well as believing voters weren't used to seeing a congressman trying to fill a governors role.

Since Republicans already held every major elective office in Utah, from Congress to state executive positions, as well as having a majority in the state legislature, the race was seen as a likely Republican pick-up. Owen's consistently trailed in the polls behind Bangerter to election day. Nevertheless, Owen's embarked on a last minute 36-hour campaign blitz, making stops in crowded spaces from stores to bowling alleys, as well as organizing "honk and wave" demonstrations for passing drivers. Bangerter spent the last hours of the campaign at a Republican rally and gave media interviews. Bangerter was ultimately elected with 55.87% of the vote, compared to Owen's 43.78%, further solidifying Republican dominance in the state.

== Primary election ==
Primary elections were held on August 21, 1984.

=== Democratic primary ===
==== Candidates ====
- Kem Gardner, chairman of the State Board of Regents
- Wayne Owens, former representative from Utah's 2nd Congressional District

==== Results ====
Democratic primary results
Party	Candidate	Votes	%
Democratic	Wayne Owens	51,302	62.02%
Democratic	Kem Gardner	31,421	37.98%
Total votes		82,723	100.00%

=== Republican primary ===
==== Candidates ====
- Norman H. Bangerter, member of Utah House of Representatives
- Dan Marriott, representative from Utah's 2nd Congressional District

==== Results ====
Republican primary results
Party	Candidate	Votes	%
Republican	Norman H. Bangerter	94,347	56.40%
Republican	Dan Marriott	72,940	43.60%
Total votes		167,287	100.00%

== General election ==
=== Candidates ===
- Wayne Owens, Democratic
- Norman H. Bangerter, Republican
- L. S. Brown, American

=== Results ===
1984 Utah gubernatorial election
Party	Candidate	Votes	%	±%
Republican	Norman H. Bangerter	351,792	55.87%	+11.45%
Democratic	Wayne Owens	275,669	43.78%	−11.38%
American	L. S. Brown	2,158	0.34%	−0.07%
Total votes		629,619	100.00%	
Majority		76,123	12.09%	
Republican gain from Democratic		Swing	+22.82%	

=== Results by county ===
County	Norman H. Bangerter Republican		Wayne Owens Democratic		L. S. Brown American		Margin		Total votes cast
County	#	%	#	%	#	%	#	%	Total votes cast
Beaver	1,085	48.87%	1,135	51.13%	0	0.00%	-50	-2.25%	2,220
Box Elder	10,061	66.20%	5,114	33.65%	22	0.14%	4,947	32.55%	15,197
Cache	16,508	62.31%	9,910	37.40%	76	0.29%	6,598	24.90%	26,494
Carbon	2,817	31.73%	6,046	68.11%	14	0.16%	-3,229	-36.37%	8,877
Daggett	249	59.57%	169	40.43%	0	0.00%	80	19.14%	418
Davis	37,648	60.46%	24,362	39.12%	263	0.42%	13,286	21.34%	62,273
Duchesne	3,518	67.92%	1,648	31.81%	14	0.27%	1,870	36.10%	5,180
Emery	2,214	49.65%	2,238	50.19%	7	0.16%	-24	-0.54%	4,459
Garfield	987	50.85%	590	48.94%	4	0.21%	37	1.91%	1,941
Grand	2,191	65.56%	1,144	34.23%	7	0.21%	1,047	31.33%	3,342
Iron	4,826	59.06%	3,329	40.74%	17	0.21%	1,497	18.32%	8,172
Juab	1,487	52.58%	1,340	47.38%	1	0.04%	147	5.20%	2,828
Kane	1,419	71.02%	579	28.98%	0	0.00%	840	42.04%	1,998
Millard	3,260	59.72%	2,185	40.03%	14	0.26%	1,075	19.69%	5,459
Morgan	1,415	58.52%	1,002	41.44%	1	0.04%	413	17.08%	2,418
Piute	390	51.66%	360	47.68%	5	0.66%	30	3.97%	755
Rich	611	65.70%	316	33.98%	3	0.32%	295	31.72%	930
Salt Lake	136,119	51.13%	128,995	48.45%	1,109	0.42%	7,124	2.68%	266,223
San Juan	2,255	61.46%	1,407	38.35%	7	0.19%	848	23.11%	3,669
Sanpete	4,243	62.96%	2,469	36.64%	27	0.40%	1,774	26.32%	6,739
Sevier	4,257	62.20%	2,480	36.24%	107	1.56%	1,777	25.96%	6,844
Summit	2,783	49.55%	28,18	50.18%	15	0.27%	-35	-0.62%	5,616
Tooele	4,755	47.06%	5,330	52.75%	20	0.20%	-575	-5.69%	10,105
Uintah	5,797	68.47%	2,642	31.20%	28	0.33%	3,155	37.26%	8,467
Utah	56,069	64.41%	30,861	35.45%	115	0.13%	25,208	28.96%	87,045
Wasatch	2,205	58.12%	1,582	41.70%	7	0.18%	623	16.42%	3,794
Washington	9,580	69.03%	4,239	30.54%	59	0.43%	5,341	38.49%	13,878
Wayne	750	65.05%	388	33.65%	15	1.30%	362	31.40%	1,153
Weber	32,293	51.16%	30,631	48.52%	201	0.32%	1,662	2.63%	63,125
Total	351,792	55.87%	275,669	43.78%	2,158	0.34%	76,123	12.09%	629,619

==== Counties that flipped from Democratic to Republican ====
- Daggett
- Davis
- Garfield
- Grand
- Iron
- Juab
- Kane
- Millard
- Piute
- Rich
- Salt Lake
- Sanpete
- Sevier
- Wasatch
- Weber

== Aftermath ==
In the Little America Hotel, Bangerter was greeted by a large crowd of supporters and with a rendition of the song "Happy Days are Here Again" playing as he took to the stage for a speech, a tune closely related to Franklin Roosevelt's 1932 campaign. Bangerter promised that the democrats would still have a voice in his government, saying "I intend in this assignment to be a governor to all people." A few blocks away, at the Salt Lake Hilton Hotel, Democrats realized they lost their only method to balance power in the Republican controlled legislature. However, it was reported that a spirit of optimism was still in the Hilton.

Bangerter's victory would mark a new Republican dominance in Utah's gubernatorial elections, as a Democrat has not won the seat from that time up to 2024.

== Bibliography ==
- Gubernatorial Elections, 1787-1997. Washington, D.C.: Congressional Quarterly Inc. 1998. ISBN 1-56802-396-0.
