= Misty Snow =

American politician

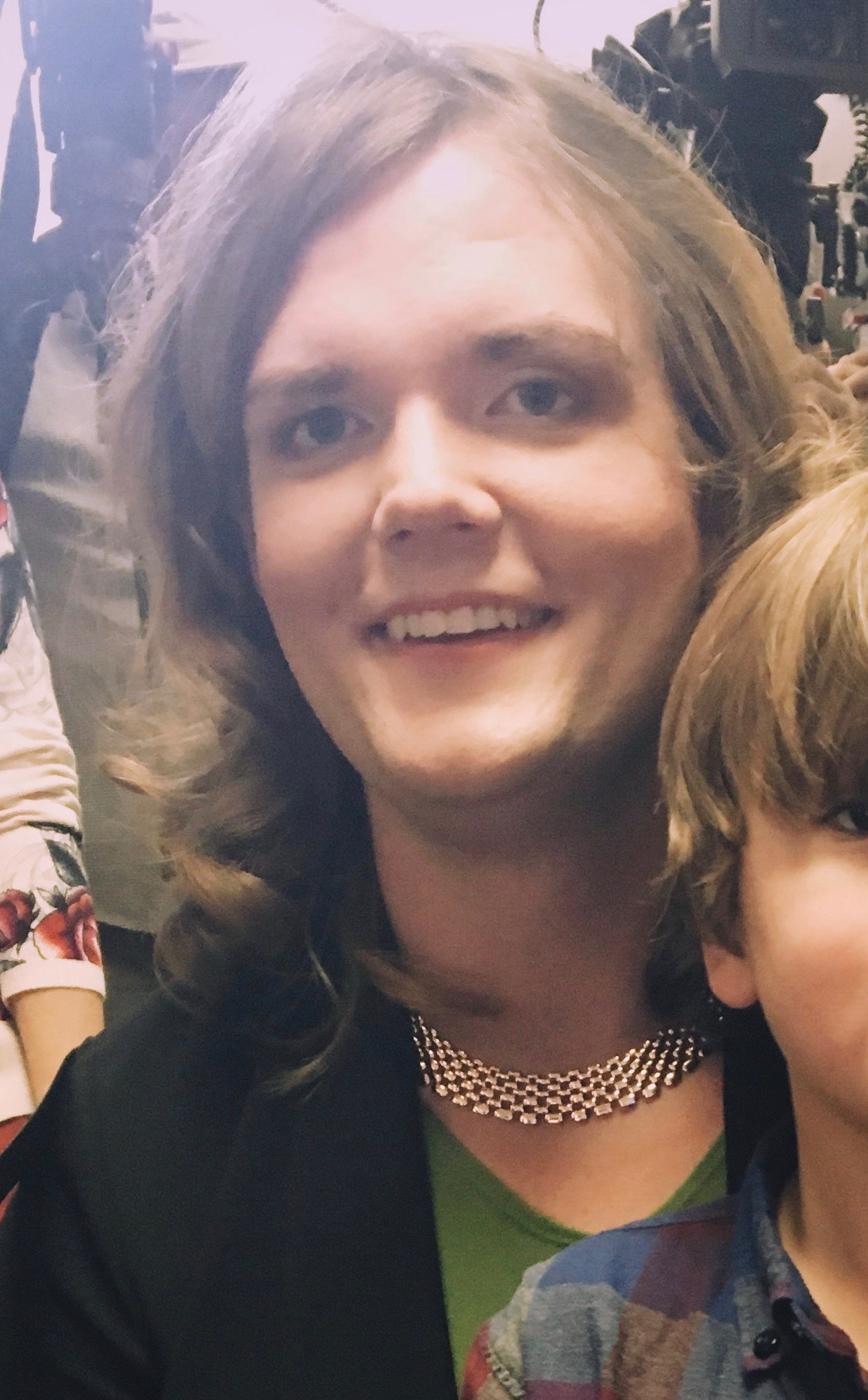

Personal details
- Born: July 19, 1985 (age 40) Salt Lake City, Utah, U.S.
- Party: Democratic

Misty Kathrine Snow (born July 19, 1985) is an American political candidate who was one of the first openly transgender people in the United States to have been nominated by a major political party for a federal office. Snow was the Democratic nominee in the 2016 United States Senate election in Utah. This also made her the first transgender person to become a nominee for the United States Senate as well as the first LGBT person to be a major-party nominee for statewide office in Utah.

== Early life ==
Snow was born in 1985 in Salt Lake City and has lived in Salt Lake County, Utah for her entire life. She worked in a grocery store and comes from a working-class family. She was raised as a Latter-Day Saint, but as she grew up, she left the Church of Jesus Christ of Latter-day Saints. She is the daughter of Linda Pace and the eldest of four children.

== Career ==
Snow was the first openly transgender candidate to win a major party primary for the U.S. Senate. She won the Democratic primary, defeating fellow Democrat Jonathan Swinton 59.5% to 40.5%.

On November 8, 2016, with 27% of the vote, Snow lost her Senate bid to Republican incumbent Mike Lee, who received 68% of the vote.

=== Political positions ===
Snow is a progressive and self-described Bernie Sanders-like Democrat. Policy priorities include increasing the federal minimum wage to $15 per hour, paid maternity leave, expansion of Medicare and Medicaid, clean energy, and LGBT nondiscrimination efforts.

=== U.S. House race ===
On April 13, 2017, Snow formally announced her run against Chris Stewart, the Republican incumbent representative for Utah's 2nd congressional district. She dropped out of the race in March 2018, and the Democratic candidate was instead Shireen Ghorbani.

== See also ==
- Misty Plowright

Party political offices
Preceded by Sam Granato	Democratic nominee for U.S. Senator from Utah (Class 3); 2016	Succeeded by Evan McMullin; Endorsed
