= 1974 United States Senate election in Utah =

- November 5, 1974
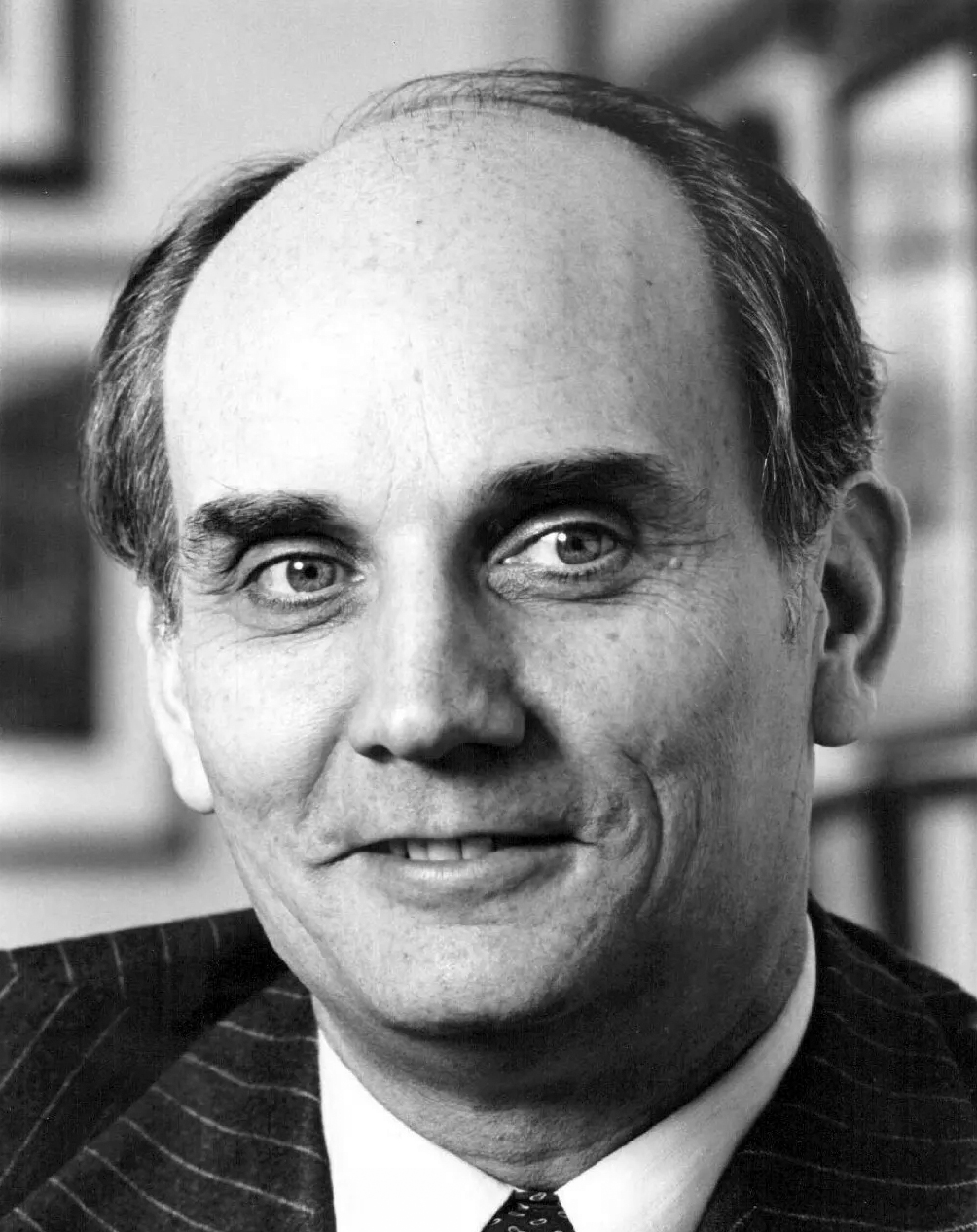

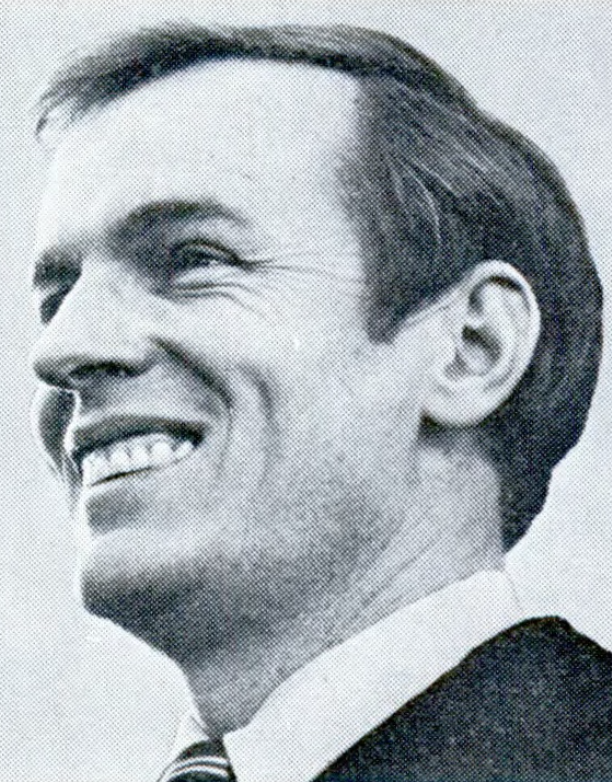

Nominee	Jake Garn	Wayne Owens	Bruce Bangerter
Party	Republican	Democratic	American
Popular vote	210,299	185,377	24,966
Percentage	49.99%	44.07%	5.94%
- County results Garn: 40–50% 50–60% 60–70% Owens: 40–50% 50–60% 70–80%
U.S. senator before election
Wallace F. Bennett
Republican
Elected U.S. Senator
Jake Garn
Republican

The 1974 United States Senate election in Utah took place on November 5, 1974 alongside other elections to the United States Senate in other states, elections to the United States House of Representatives, and various state and local elections.

Incumbent Republican U.S. Senator Wallace F. Bennett did not run for re-election to a fifth term, but retired. Republican nominee Jake Garn defeated Democratic nominee Wayne Owens. This is the last Senate election in which Salt Lake County voted Democratic.

== Nominations ==
=== Democratic nomination ===
==== Candidates ====
- Donald Holbrook, attorney
- Wayne Owens, U.S. congressman for Utah's 2nd congressional district

==== Results ====
Owens defeated Holbrook at the state convention on July 12 to 13 with over 70% of the vote and therefore avoided a primary.

Democratic convention, 12 to 13 July 1974
Party	Candidate	Votes	%
Democratic	Wayne Owens	1,088	70.4%
Democratic	Donald L. Holbrook	458	29.6%
Total votes		1,546	

=== Republican nomination ===
==== Candidates ====
- Jake Garn, incumbent mayor of Salt Lake City
- Dale R. Hawkins, Weber State College professor
- Paul S. Knowlton, wholesaler
- Byron Rampton, former state senator

==== Results ====
Garn won over 70% of the vote at the state convention on July 27 and therefore avoided a primary.

Republican convention, 27 July 1974
Party	Candidate	Votes	%
Republican	Jake Garn	1,750	88.1%
Republican	Dale R. Hawkins	153	7.7%
Republican	Byron Rampton	81	4.1%
Republican	Paul S. Knowlton	3	0.2%
Total votes		1,987	

=== American Party nomination ===
==== Candidates ====
- Bruce Bangerter, American Independent nominee for Utah's 2nd congressional district in 1972
- Kenneth R. Larsen

==== Eliminated at convention ====
- Louie Youngkeit

==== Results ====
American Party primary, 10 September 1974
Party	Candidate	Votes	%
American	Bruce Bangerter	2,254	50.9%
American	Kenneth R. Larsen	2,173	49.1%
Total votes		4,427	

== General election ==
=== Candidates ===
- Bruce Bangerter (American)
- Jake Garn, incumbent mayor of Salt Lake City (Republican)
- Wayne Owens, incumbent U.S. congressman (Democratic)

=== Results ===
1974 United States Senate election in Utah
Party	Candidate	Votes	%
Republican	Jake Garn	210,299	49.99
Democratic	Wayne Owens	185,377	44.07
American	Bruce Bangerter	24,966	5.94
Majority		24,922	5.92
Turnout		420,642	
Republican hold			

== See also ==
- 1974 United States Senate elections

== Bibliography ==
- Congressional Elections, 1946-1996. Washington, D.C.: Congressional Quarterly Inc. 1998. ISBN 1-56802-248-4.
- Scammon, Richard M., ed. (1975). America Votes 11: a handbook of contemporary American election statistics, 1974. Washington, D.C.: Elections Research Center.
