= 2014 United States House of Representatives elections in Utah =

- November 4, 2014

All 4 Utah seats to the United States House of Representatives
	Majority party	Minority party
Party	Republican	Democratic
Last election	3	1
Seats won	4	0
Seat change	▲1	▼1
Popular vote	351,034	183,491
Percentage	62.02%	32.42%
Swing	▼2.84%	▼0.05%

Republican
40–50%
50–60%
60–70%
70–80%
80–90%
Democratic
40–50%
50–60%

The 2014 United States House of Representatives elections in Utah were held on November 4, 2014, to elect the four U.S. representatives from Utah, one from each of the state's four congressional districts. Representatives are elected for two-year terms; those elected would serve in the 114th Congress from January 2015 until January 2017.

== Overview ==
United States House of Representatives elections in Utah, 2014
Party	Votes	Percentage	Seats before	Seats after	+/–
Republican	351,034	62.02%	3	4	+1
Democratic	183,491	32.42%	1	0	-1
Independent American	13,086	2.31%	0	0	-
Libertarian	6,198	1.10%	0	0	-
Constitution	5,933	1.05%	0	0	-
Independent	6,228	1.10%	0	0	-
Totals	565,970	100.00%	4	4	-

=== By district ===
Results of the 2014 United States House of Representatives elections in Utah by district:

District	Republican		Democratic		Others		Total		Result
District	Votes	%	Votes	%	Votes	%	Votes	%	Result
District 1	84,231	64.78%	36,422	28.01%	9,381	7.21%	130,034	100%	Republican hold
District 2	88,915	60.82%	47,585	32.55%	9,688	6.63%	146,188	100%	Republican hold
District 3	102,952	72.21%	32,059	22.48%	7,569	5.31%	142,580	100%	Republican hold
District 4	74,936	52.56%	67,425	47.29%	4,807	3.37%	147,168	100%	Republican gain
Total	351,034	62.02%	183,491	32.42%	31,445	5.56%	565,970	100%	

== District 1 ==
2014 Utah's 1st congressional district election
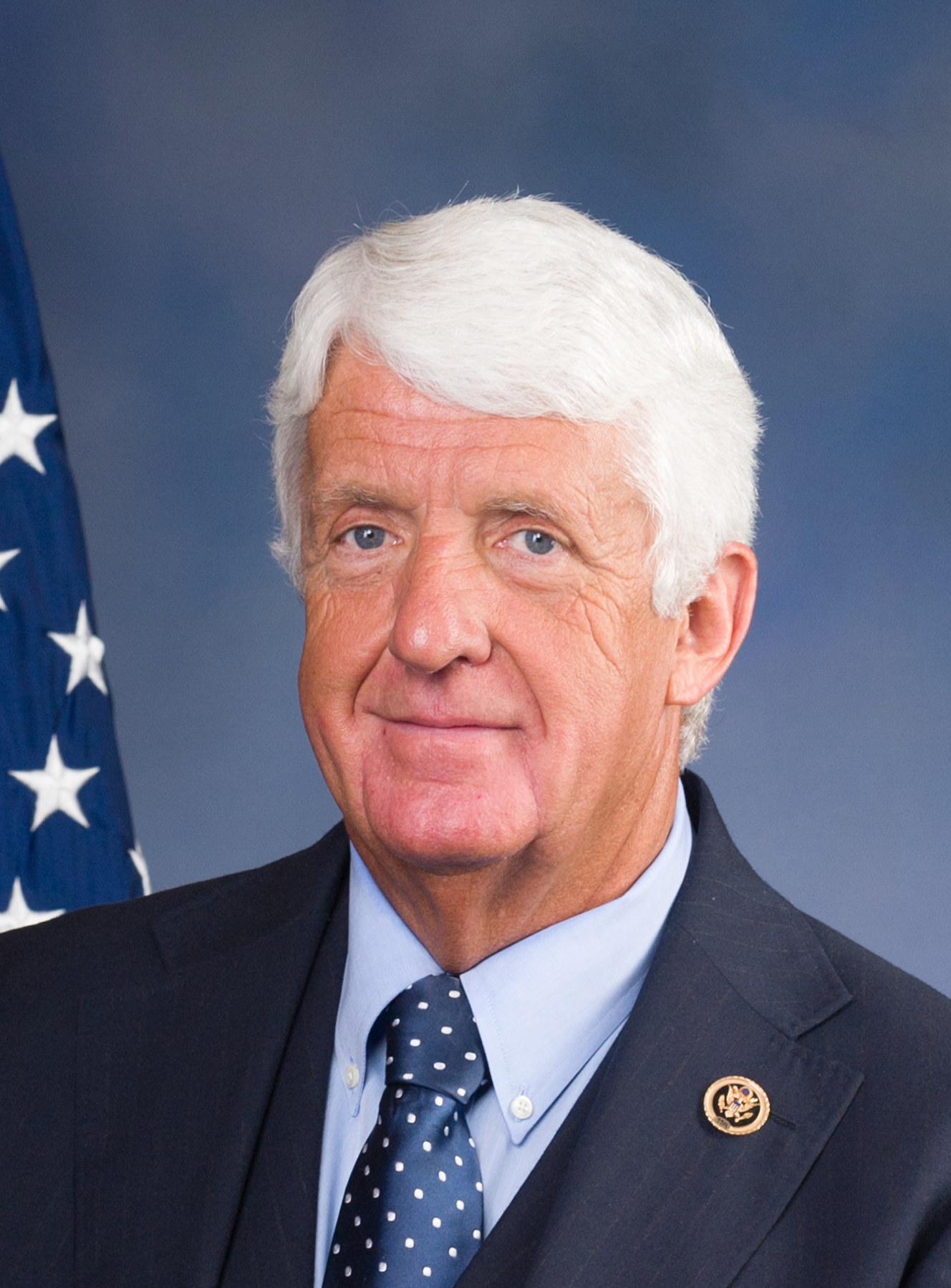

Nominee	Rob Bishop	Donna McAleer
Party	Republican	Democratic
Popular vote	84,231	36,422
Percentage	64.8%	28.0%
- County results Bishop: 50–60% 60–70% 70–80% 80–90% McAleer: 50–60%
U.S. Representative before election
Rob Bishop
Republican
Elected U.S. Representative
Rob Bishop
Republican

The 1st district is located in northern Utah and includes the cities of Ogden and Logan, as well as the northern half of the Great Salt Lake. Incumbent Republican Rob Bishop, who had represented the district since 2003, ran for re-election. He was re-elected with 72% of the vote in 2012, and the district has a PVI of R+27.

=== Republican nomination ===
Bishop was challenged in the Republican primary by David Yu-Lin Chiu. At the Republican State Convention on April 26, 2014, Bishop received 81% of the vote to Chiu's 19%, winning the nomination without the need for a primary.

==== Nominee ====
- Rob Bishop, incumbent U.S. Representative

==== Eliminated at convention ====
- David Yu-Lin Chiu

=== Democratic nomination ===
Former U.S. Army Second Lieutenant, businesswoman and nominee for the seat in 2012 Donna McAleer ran again for the Democrats. Physician Peter Clemens also ran.

At the Democratic State Convention, also held on April 26, 2014, McAleer received 58.9% to Clemens' 40.1%, just 2 votes short of the 60% needed to avoid a primary election, with 4 delegates abstaining. On the second ballot, she received 75% to Clemens' 25% and was nominated.

==== Candidates ====
===== Nominee =====
- Donna McAleer, former U.S. Army Second Lieutenant, businesswoman and nominee for the seat in 2012

===== Eliminated at convention =====
- Peter Clemens, physician

=== General election ===
Libertarian Craig Bowden and Independent American Dwayne A. Vance were also on the ballot.

==== Polling ====
Poll source	Date(s) administered	Sample size	Margin of error	Rob Bishop (R)	Donna McAleer (D)	Other	Undecided
Brigham Young University	October 15–22, 2014	159	–	49%	31%	5%	15%

==== Predictions ====
Source	Ranking	As of
The Cook Political Report	Safe R	November 3, 2014
Rothenberg	Safe R	October 24, 2014
Sabato's Crystal Ball	Safe R	October 30, 2014
RCP	Safe R	November 2, 2014
Daily Kos Elections	Safe R	November 4, 2014

==== Results ====
Utah's 1st congressional district, 2014
Party	Candidate	Votes	%
Republican	Rob Bishop (incumbent)	84,231	64.8
Democratic	Donna McAleer	36,422	28.0
Libertarian	Craig Bowden	4,847	3.7
Independent American	Dwayne A. Vance	4,534	3.5
Total votes		130,034	100.0
Republican hold			

== District 2 ==
2014 Utah's 2nd congressional district election
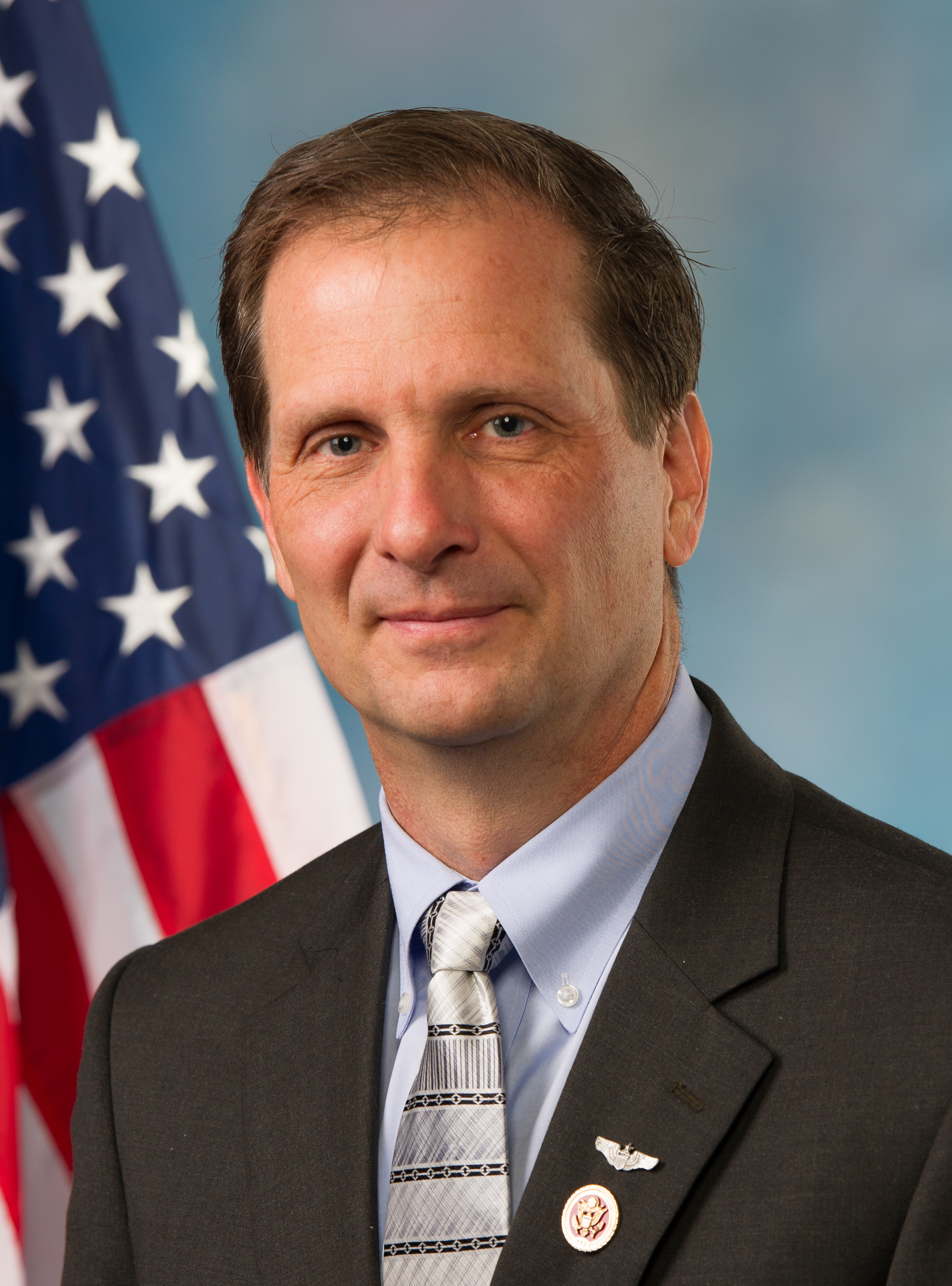

Nominee	Chris Stewart	Luz Robles
Party	Republican	Democratic
Popular vote	88,915	47,585
Percentage	60.8%	32.5%
- County results Stewart: 40–50% 60–70% 70–80% 80–90% Robles: 60–70%
U.S. Representative before election
Chris Stewart
Republican
Elected U.S. Representative
Chris Stewart
Republican

The 2nd district is located in western and southern Utah and includes largely rural parts of the state as well as the state capital Salt Lake City and the cities of St. George and Tooele. Incumbent Republican Chris Stewart, who had represented the district since 2013, ran for re-election. He was elected with 62% of the vote in 2012, succeeding Democrat Jim Matheson, who ran in the newly created 4th district. The district has a PVI of R+18.

=== Republican nomination ===
Stewart was challenged in the Republican primary by Zachary A. Hartman, Vaughn Hatton and attorney Larry Meyers. At the Republican State Convention on April 26, 2014, Stewart received 68% of the vote, winning the nomination without the need for a primary. Meyers took 22%, Hatton took 6% and Hartman took 5%.

==== Nominee ====
- Chris Stewart, incumbent U.S. Representative

==== Eliminated at convention ====
- Zachary A. Hartman
- Vaughn Hatton
- Larry Meyers, attorney

=== Democratic nomination ===
State Senator Luz Robles ran for the Democrats. At the Democratic State Convention, also held on April 26, 2014, she was nominated by acclamation.

==== Nominee ====
- Luz Robles, state senator

=== General election ===
Also on the ballot were Shaun McCausland of the Constitution Party, Independent American Wayne L. Hill and Independent Bill Barron. Independent Warren Rogers ran as a write-in candidate.

==== Polling ====
Poll source	Date(s) administered	Sample size	Margin of error	Chris Stewart (R)	Luz Robles (D)	Other	Undecided
Brigham Young University	October 15–22, 2014	192	–	43%	37%	4%	16%

==== Predictions ====
Source	Ranking	As of
The Cook Political Report	Safe R	November 3, 2014
Rothenberg	Safe R	October 24, 2014
Sabato's Crystal Ball	Safe R	October 30, 2014
RCP	Safe R	November 2, 2014
Daily Kos Elections	Safe R	November 4, 2014

==== Results ====
Utah's 2nd congressional district, 2014
Party	Candidate	Votes	%
Republican	Chris Stewart (incumbent)	88,915	60.8
Democratic	Luz Robles	47,585	32.5
Constitution	Shaun McCausland	4,509	3.1
Independent American	Wayne L. Hill	3,328	2.3
Independent	Bill Barron	1,734	1.2
Independent	Warren Rogers (write-in)	117	0.1
Total votes		146,188	100.0
Republican hold			

== District 3 ==
2014 Utah's 3rd congressional district election
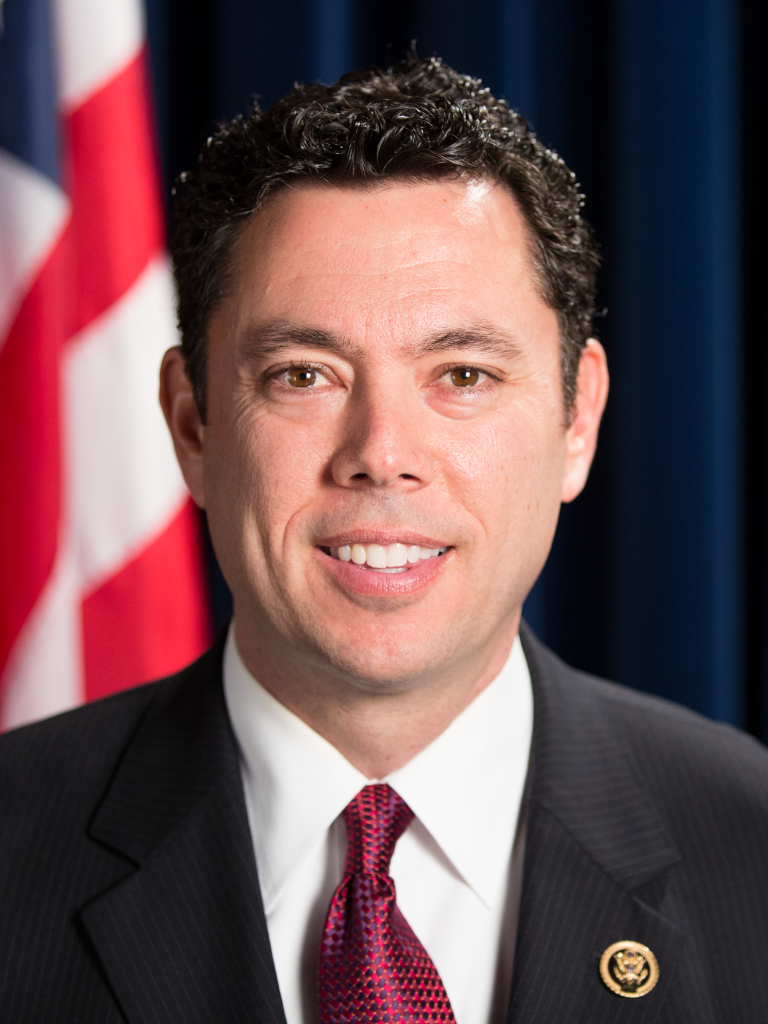

Nominee	Jason Chaffetz	Brian Wonnacott
Party	Republican	Democratic
Popular vote	102,952	32,059
Percentage	72.2%	22.5%
- County results Chaffetz: 40–50% 50–60% 70–80% 80–90%
U.S. Representative before election
Jason Chaffetz
Republican
Elected U.S. Representative
Jason Chaffetz
Republican

The 3rd district is located in southern and eastern Utah and includes the cities of Orem and Provo. Incumbent Republican Jason Chaffetz, who had represented the district since 2009, ran for re-election. He was re-elected with 77% of the vote in 2012, and the district has a PVI of R+28.

=== Republican nomination ===
Chaffetz was challenged in the Republican primary by Mark Hedengren and Robert J. Stevens. At the Republican State Convention on April 26, 2014, Chaffetz received 87% of the vote, winning the nomination without the need for a primary. Hedengren and Stevens each took 6% of the vote.

==== Nominee ====
- Jason Chaffetz, incumbent U.S. Representative

==== Eliminated at convention ====
- Mark Hedengren
- Robert J. Stevens

=== Democratic nomination ===
Software engineer Brian Wonnacott ran for the Democrats. He had planned to run as an independent, but changed his mind shortly before the filing deadline when he saw that no one had filed to run as a Democrat. At the Democratic State Convention, also held on April 26, 2014, he was nominated by acclamation.

==== Nominee ====
- Brian Wonnacott, software engineer

=== General election ===
Independent American Zack Strong defeated Abraham for his party's nomination. Independents Ben J. Mates and Stephen P. Tyron were also on the ballot. David Else, 2nd vice-chair and Southern Regional Coordinator of the Independent American Party, ran as an independent write-in candidate.

==== Polling ====
Poll source	Date(s) administered	Sample size	Margin of error	Jason Chaffetz (R)	Brian Wonnacott (D)	Other	Undecided
Brigham Young University	October 15–22, 2014	169	–	59%	25%	2%	15%

==== Predictions ====
Source	Ranking	As of
The Cook Political Report	Safe R	November 3, 2014
Rothenberg	Safe R	October 24, 2014
Sabato's Crystal Ball	Safe R	October 30, 2014
RCP	Safe R	November 2, 2014
Daily Kos Elections	Safe R	November 4, 2014

==== Results ====
Utah's 3rd congressional district, 2014
Party	Candidate	Votes	%
Republican	Jason Chaffetz (incumbent)	102,952	72.2
Democratic	Brian Wonnacott	32,059	22.5
Independent American	Zack Strong	3,192	2.2
Independent	Stephen P. Tryon	2,584	1.8
Independent	Ben J. Mates	1,513	1.1
Independent	David A. Else (write-in)	280	0.2
Total votes		142,580	100.0
Republican hold			

== District 4 ==
2014 Utah's 4th congressional district election
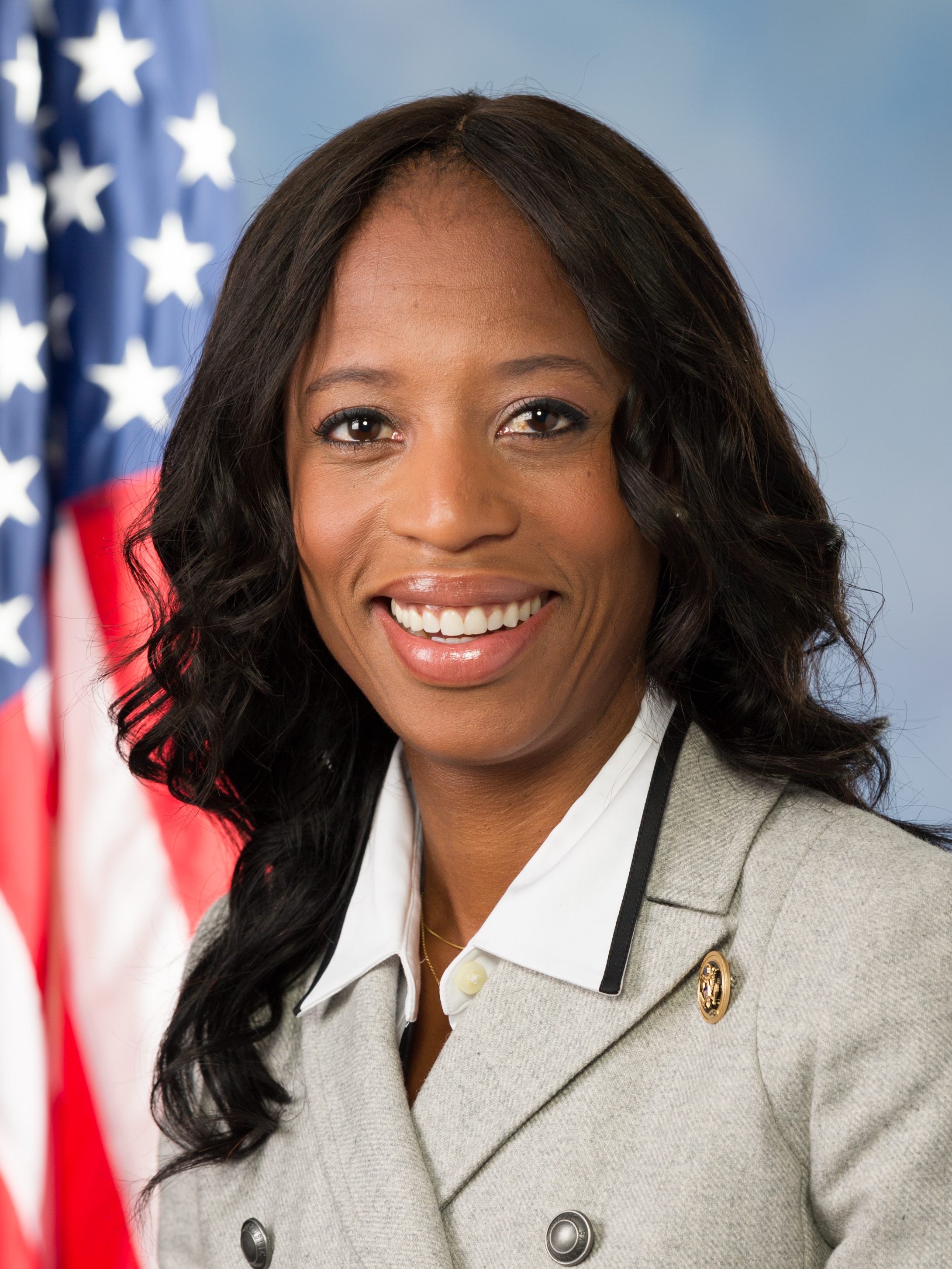

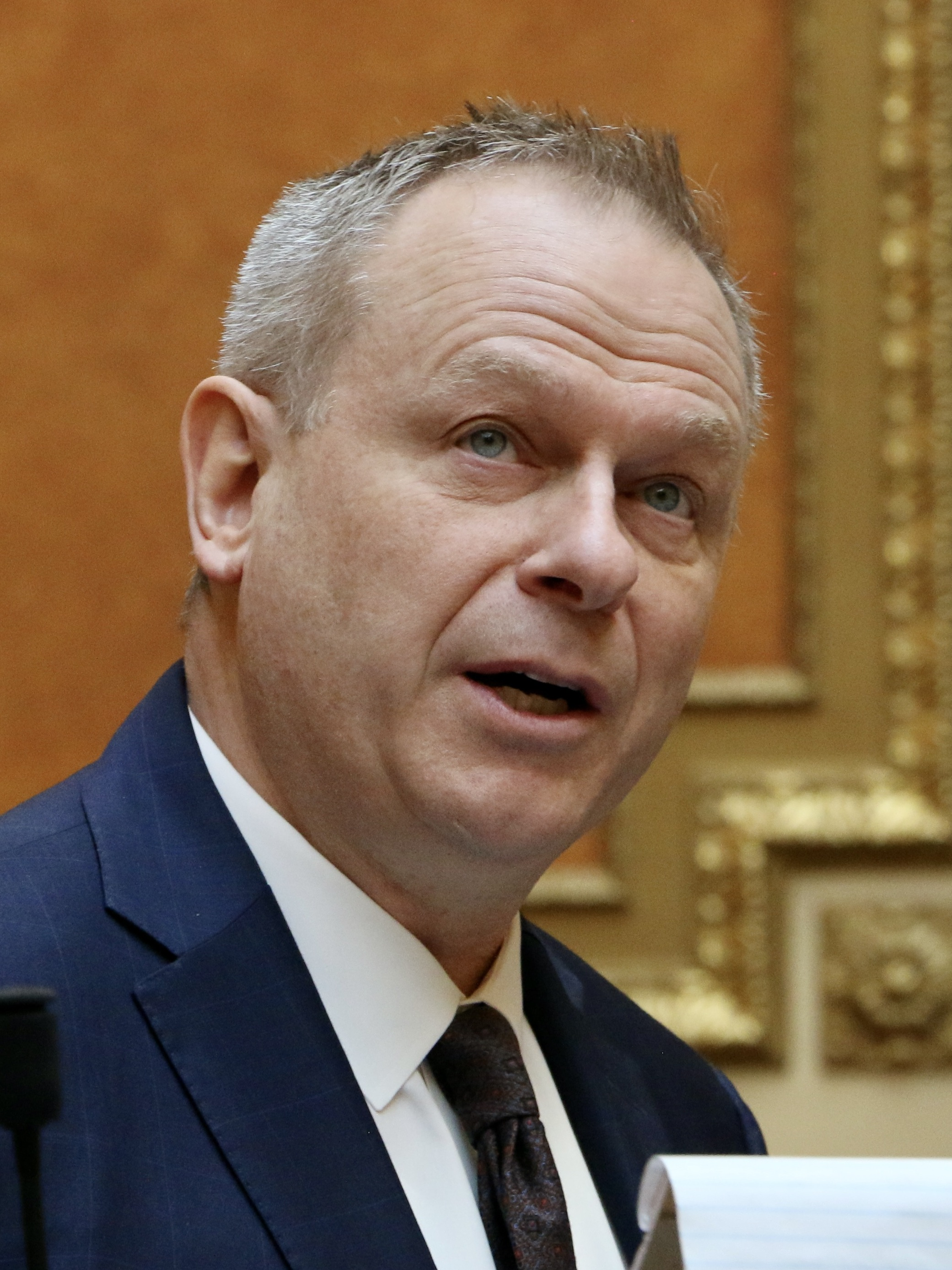
Nominee	Mia Love	Doug Owens
Party	Republican	Democratic
Popular vote	74,936	67,425
Percentage	50.9%	45.8%
- County results Love: 60–70% 70–80% Owens: 40–50%
U.S. Representative before election
Jim Matheson
Democratic
Elected U.S. Representative
Mia Love
Republican

The 4th district is located in northern-central Utah and includes parts of Salt Lake, Utah, Juab, and Sanpete counties. The incumbent, Democrat Jim Matheson, who had represented the district since 2013 and previously represented the 2nd district from 2001 to 2013, retired. He was re-elected with 49% of the vote in 2012, and the district has a PVI of R+16.

=== Democratic nomination ===
On December 17, 2013, Matheson announced he would not seek re-election. Fellow moderate Democrat and future state representative Doug Owens, an attorney and son of the late Congressman Wayne Owens, and engineer and candidate for the U.S. Senate in 2012 Bill Peterson ran for their party's nomination. At the Democratic State Convention on April 26, 2014, Owens received 98% of the vote to Peterson's 2% and was nominated.

==== Candidates ====
===== Nominee =====
- Doug Owens, attorney and son of former representative Wayne Owens

===== Eliminated at convention =====
- Bill Peterson, engineer and candidate for the U.S. Senate in 2012

=== Republican nomination ===
Republican Mia Love, the former mayor of Saratoga Springs, who lost to Matheson by 768 votes in 2012, ran again. She was challenged for the Republican nomination by businessman, former director of Utah's Office of Business and Economic Development and candidate for the seat in 2012 Bob Fuehr. Investment fund manager and Utah State Board of Education member Jennifer Johnson had been running, but withdrew from the race in April 2014. At the Republican nominating convention, also on April 26, 2014, Love received 78% of the vote to 22% for Fuehr, and was thus nominated without the need for a primary.

==== Candidates ====
===== Nominee =====
- Mia Love, former mayor of Saratoga Springs and nominee for this seat in 2012

===== Eliminated at convention =====
- Bob Fuehr, businessman, former director of Utah's Office of Business and Economic Development and candidate for the seat in 2012

===== Withdrawn =====
- Jennifer Johnson, investment fund manager and Utah State Board of Education member

=== General election ===
Also on the ballot were Collin Robert Simonsen of the Constitution Party, Independent American Party Tim Aalders and Libertarian Jim L. Vein.

==== Polling ====
Poll source	Date(s) administered	Sample size	Margin of error	Doug Owens (D)	Mia Love (R)	Other	Undecided
Dan Jones/Cicero Group	October 20–29, 2014	402	± 4.89%	43%	48%	3%	6%
Brigham Young University	October 15–22, 2014	236	–	46%	42%	5%	7%
Dan Jones/Cicero Group	October 7–9, 2014	400	± 4.9%	40%	49%	3%	9%
FM3 (D-Owens)	October 6–7, 2014	403	± 4.9%	44%	47%	—	9%
Y2 Analytics (R-Love)	October 2–4, 2014	500	± 4.4%	28%	47%	—	24%
Dan Jones/Cicero Group	August 7–9, 2014	443	± 4.64%	32%	44%	5%	19%
FM3 (D-Owens)	July 15–17, 2014	400	± 4.9%	41%	50%	—	8%

Hypothetical polling

Poll source	Date(s) administered	Sample size	Margin o error	Jim Matheson (D)	Mia Love (R)	Other	Undecided
Dan Jones/Cicero Group	August 7–9, 2014	443	± 4.64%	45%	39%	4%	12%

==== Predictions ====
Source	Ranking	As of
The Cook Political Report	Likely R (flip)	November 3, 2014
Rothenberg	Safe R (flip)	October 24, 2014
Sabato's Crystal Ball	Safe R (flip)	October 30, 2014
RCP	Likely R (flip)	November 2, 2014
Daily Kos Elections	Likely R (flip)	November 4, 2014

==== Results ====
Utah's 4th congressional district, 2014
Party	Candidate	Votes	%
Republican	Mia Love	74,936	50.9
Democratic	Doug Owens	67,425	45.8
Independent American	Tim Aalders	2,032	1.4
Constitution	Collin Robert Simonsen	1,424	1.0
Libertarian	Jim L. Vein	1,351	0.9
Total votes		147,168	100.0
Republican gain from Democratic			

== See also ==
- 2014 Utah elections
- 2014 United States elections
