= Wayne Owens =

American politician (1937–2002)

Douglas Wayne Owens
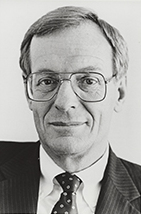

Member of the U.S. House of Representatives from Utah's 2nd district
- In office January 3, 1987 – January 3, 1993
- Preceded by: David Smith Monson
- Succeeded by: Karen Shepherd
- In office January 3, 1973 – January 3, 1975
- Preceded by: Sherman P. Lloyd
- Succeeded by: Allan Turner Howe

Personal details
- Born: May 2, 1937 Panguitch, Utah, U.S.
- Died: December 18, 2002 (aged 65) Tel Aviv, Israel
- Resting place: Salt Lake City Cemetery; 40°46′37.92″N 111°51′28.8″W
- Party: Democratic
- Spouse: Marlene Wessel
- Children: 5
- Education: University of Utah
- Profession: Attorney

Douglas Wayne Owens (May 2, 1937 – December 18, 2002) was an American politician and a member of the United States House of Representatives for Utah's 2nd congressional district from 1973 to 1975 and again from 1987 to 1993. He was posthumously inducted into the Hinckley Institute of Politics hall of Fame.

== Early life and education ==
Born and raised in the small town of Panguitch, Utah, Owens graduated from Panguitch High School in 1955, then attended the University of Utah in Salt Lake City, from which he earned his Bachelor's degree in 1961 and his Juris Doctor in 1964. Owens's undergraduate education was interrupted while he served as missionary to France for the Church of Jesus Christ of Latter-day Saints (LDS church) from 1957 to 1960. In France, he met his future wife, Marlene, a fellow missionary for the church.

Owens worked his way through college and law school with various jobs, including being a night-watchman at the Beehive House. He then worked as a lawyer in private practice and as a staffer for three United States Senators: Frank Moss of Utah, Robert F. Kennedy of New York, and Edward M. Kennedy of Massachusetts. He was the Western states coordinator for the presidential campaigns of Robert Kennedy in 1968 and Edward Kennedy in 1980, and also served as a delegate to the Democratic National Convention in 1968 and 1980.

== Career ==
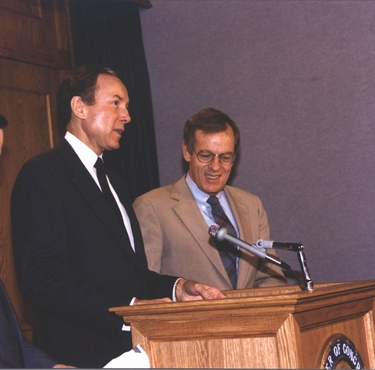
U.S. Sen. Orrin Hatch (R-Utah) (left) holds a press conference with U.S. Rep. Wayne Owens (D-Utah) (right) in March 1989 as part of their successful charge to win passage of the Radiation Exposure Compensation Act (RECA), which provides for ongoing compensation to Southern Utahns and others damaged by nuclear testing in the 1950s and 1960s.

In 1972, he was elected to the U.S. House of Representatives as a Democrat by "walking for Congress" throughout the district to meet voters personally. He unseated incumbent Republican Sherman P. Lloyd with 55% of the vote. During that period, he sat on the House Judiciary Committee which voted for the articles of impeachment of President Richard M. Nixon.

He ran an unsuccessful U.S. Senate campaign against Jake Garn in 1974, then served as a mission president of the LDS Canada Montreal Mission from 1975 to 1978, after which he returned to Salt Lake City to practice law. In 1984, Owens lost the Utah gubernatorial race to Republican Norman H. Bangerter, but was re-elected to the House in 1986 and served through 1992, when he ran for the U.S. Senate again. That year, he was defeated by a wider margin than expected by Bob Bennett. Owens was embarrassed that year by his involvement in the so-called House banking scandal. In 1989, Owens accompanied financier and child sex trafficker Jeffrey Epstein on a Middle East trip for the stated purpose of exploring business ties between Israel and other countries.

== Personal life ==
On December 18, 2002, Owens suffered a fatal heart attack in Tel Aviv, Israel, while on a trip to further the cause of Middle East peace.

Speaking at the funeral, Gordon B. Hinckley called Owens "a man of achievement" and a peacemaker who desired to make the world better. At the time of his death, he was continuing his efforts to improve the world, heading up the Center for Middle East Peace & Economic Cooperation. "I was with him constantly", Hinckley said. "I learned to appreciate and respect him and honor him. I have followed him ever since."

In the 2014 and 2016 congressional elections, Wayne Owens's son, Doug Owens, ran for election to Utah's 4th congressional district. He was defeated by Republican candidate Mia Love in both of his runs.

Party political offices
Preceded by Milton N. Weilenmann	Democratic nominee for U.S. Senator from Utah (Class 3); 1974	Succeeded by Dan Berman
Preceded by Scott M. Matheson	Democratic nominee for Governor of Utah; 1984	Succeeded by Ted Wilson
Preceded by Craig S. Oliver	Democratic nominee for U.S. Senator from Utah (Class 3); 1992	Succeeded by Scott Leckman
U.S. House of Representatives
Preceded by Sherman P. Lloyd	Member of the U.S. House of Representatives from Utah's 2nd congressional district 1973–1975	Succeeded by Allan Turner Howe
Preceded by David Smith Monson	Member of the U.S. House of Representatives from Utah's 2nd congressional district 1987–1993	Succeeded by Karen Shepherd
