= Doug Owens =

American politician

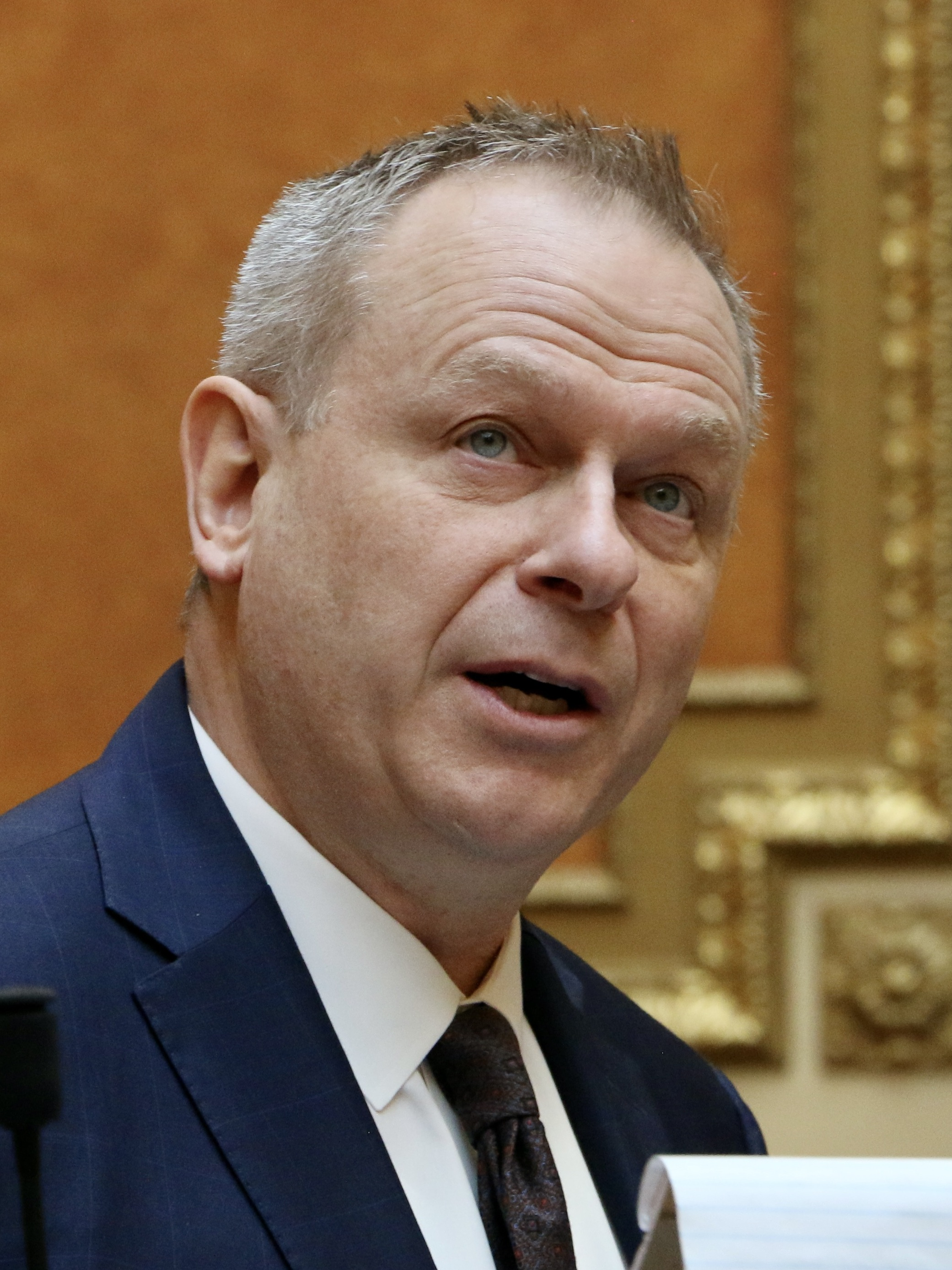

Member of the Utah House of Representatives
- Incumbent
- Assumed office January 1, 2021
- Preceded by: Patrice Arent
- Constituency: 36th district (2021–2023); 33rd district (2023–present)

Personal details
- Party: Democratic
- Education: University of Utah; Yale University

Doug Owens is an American politician from Utah that represents District 33 in the Utah House of Representatives. He ran for Congress twice for Utah's 4th District. He was the Democratic nominee for Congress in this district in 2014 and 2016, and he was defeated by Mia Love both times.

== Early life and career ==
Doug Owens is the second-oldest child of Wayne Owens, a former Utah congressman. Owens is a member of the LDS Church, and graduated from the University of Utah, and Yale Law School.

Owens spent twenty years as a practicing attorney in business and environmental law. When his father, Wayne Owens, ran for governor in 1984 (a race he lost to Republican Norm Bangerter), Owens managed the campaign.

== Political campaigns ==
=== 2014 and 2016 congressional elections ===
Owens announced his candidacy for Utah's 4th Congressional District seat in the 2014 elections on March 17, 2014. He lost the election in November to Mia Love, losing 50% to 47%.

In July 2015, Owens announced that he would be challenging Love again. Love won re-election with 53% of the vote.

=== 2020 Utah House of Representatives election ===
Owens was nominated by the Democratic Party in state House District 36 in the Millcreek / Holladay area to replace outgoing veteran Patrice Arent, who had announced she would retire. After winning the Democratic primary against three candidates, he defeated Republican Lisa Bagley in the November election, with 60% of the vote.

2020 Utah House of Representatives District 36 Election
| Party | Candidate | Votes | % |
|---|---|---|---|
| Democratic | Doug Owens | 14,350 | 59.7% |
| Republican | Lisa Bagley | 9,365 | 39.0% |
| Constitution | Nishan Beglarian | 321 | 1.3% |
| Total votes | | 24,036 | 100.00% |

== Political positions and legislation ==
Owens supports the Great Salt Lake preservation efforts. He said that "I hope people understand the urgency of the situation. It is nothing short of an emergency that we make sure we conserve that incredible place, not only for air quality, industry, and ecology, but it is part of our identity as a state." Rep. Owens called for all legislators to observe the conditions of the Great Salt Lake first hand from the air by helicopter, of which the Legislative leadership agreed.

In 2021, Owens voiced his support for restoring the size of Bears Ears National Monument to the original size. He also sponsored a bill with Rep. Phil Lyman "that would create a task force to explore the creation of a visitor center in the Bears Ears area." The passed the legislature and was signed by the governor into law.

== Committee assignments ==
He served on the Public Utilities and Technology committee, the Economic Development & Workforce Services committee, and the Natural Resources, Agriculture & Environmental Quality committee in the 2021 legislature. During the 2022 Legislative Session, Rep. Owens served on the House Economic Development and Workforce Services Committee, the House Public Utilities, Energy, and Technology Committee, the Legislative Water Development Commission, and the Natural Resources, Agriculture, and Environmental Quality Appropriations Subcommittee.
