= Mia Love =

American politician (1975–2025)

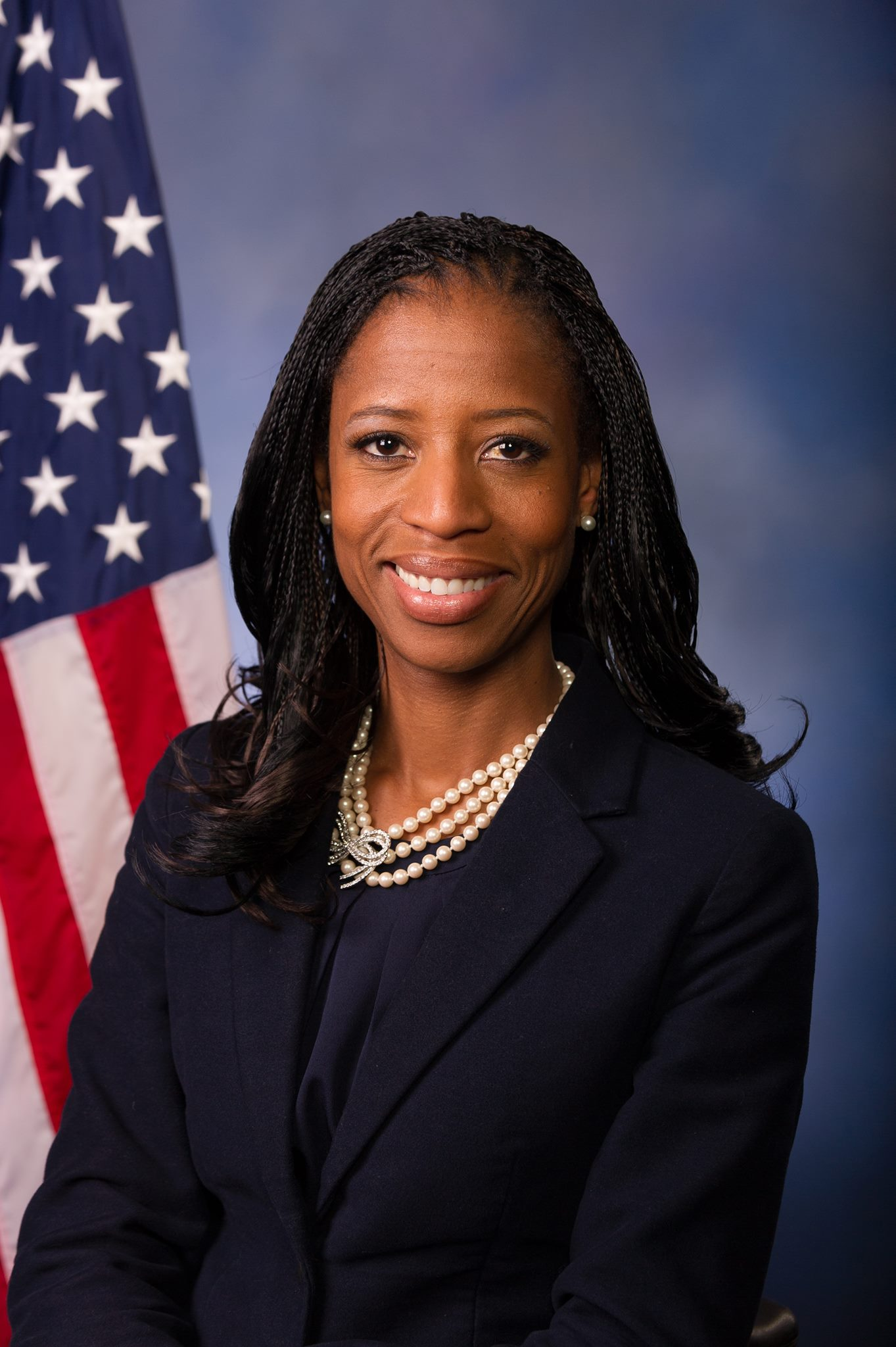
- Official portrait, 2015

Member of the U.S. House of Representatives from Utah's 4th district
- In office January 3, 2015 – January 3, 2019
- Preceded by: Jim Matheson
- Succeeded by: Ben McAdams

Mayor of Saratoga Springs
- In office January 8, 2010 – January 8, 2014
- Preceded by: Timothy Parker
- Succeeded by: Jim Miller

Personal details
- Born: Ludmya Bourdeau; December 6, 1975 New York City, U.S.
- Died: March 23, 2025 (aged 49) Saratoga Springs, Utah, U.S.
- Party: Republican
- Spouse: Jason Love (m. 1998)
- Children: 3
- Education: University of Hartford (BFA)
- Love's voice Love opposing the Joint Comprehensive Plan of Action; Recorded July 14, 2015

Ludmya "Mia" Love (née Bourdeau; December 6, 1975 – March 23, 2025) was an American political commentator and politician who served as the U.S. representative for Utah's 4th congressional district from 2015 to 2019. A member of the Republican Party, she was the first Haitian American elected to Congress, the first Black person elected to Congress from Utah, and the first Republican Black woman elected to Congress.

Born to Haitian parents in the New York City borough of Brooklyn and raised in Connecticut, Love graduated from the University of Hartford. She was elected mayor of Saratoga Springs, Utah, in 2010, having previously served on its City Council. She spoke at the 2012 Republican National Convention. That year, she ran for Congress in Utah's 4th congressional district, losing narrowly to incumbent Democratic Party U.S. Representative Jim Matheson. She ran for Congress again and was elected in 2014, defeating Democratic opponent Doug Owens; she defeated Owens a second time to win re-election in 2016. After losing re-election in 2018 to Democrat Ben McAdams by 694 votes, Love was hired by CNN as a political commentator in 2019.

In 2022, Love was diagnosed with glioblastoma, an aggressive form of brain cancer. She died in March 2025 at age 49.

== Early life and education ==
Love was born Ludmya Bourdeau on December 6, 1975, in the New York City borough of Brooklyn. She was the daughter of Mary and Jean Maxime Bourdeau. At a time of political repression, her parents emigrated together from Haiti in 1973, leaving their two older children behind with family. Her father had been threatened by the Tonton Macoute, the secret police in Haiti, and her parents traveled to the United States on a tourist visa. They spoke no English when they arrived. Her father became a paint company manager, and her mother worked as a nurse.

Love's birth enabled her parents to gain a U.S. residency permit under an immigration law that favored immigrants from the Western Hemisphere who had a child born in the United States; the law expired in January 1976, just 25 days after Love's birth. They later became naturalized citizens.

When Love was five, her family moved from Brooklyn to Norwalk, Connecticut. Love attended Norwalk High School. She was raised as a Catholic in the faith of her parents. After the family settled in Norwalk, her parents brought her older siblings from Haiti to reunite the family.

Love attended the University of Hartford Hartt School with a half-tuition scholarship. She graduated with a degree in musical theatre.

== Early career ==
After college, she worked at Sento Corporation and the Echopass Corporation. She was also a flight attendant with Continental Airlines. Love moved to Utah in 1998. Love began to be active in civic affairs when she served as the community spokesperson in Saratoga Springs, Utah, in an effort to persuade the developer of her neighborhood to spray against flies.

In 2003, Love won a seat on the Saratoga Springs City Council. She was the first female Haitian-American elected official in Utah County; she took office in January 2004. During an economic downturn, as part of the city council, Love approved a transition from the agriculture tax to municipal tax. She worked with other city council members to cut expenses, reducing the city's shortfall during the economic downturn from $3.5 million to $779,000. Saratoga Springs by 2011 had attained the highest possible bond rating for a city of its size.

After six years on the council, Love was elected mayor of Saratoga Springs, defeating opponent Jeff Francom by a margin of 861–594. She served from January 2010 to January 2014. During her term, Love led the city in dealing with natural disasters, including a wildfire, followed shortly afterward by a severe mudslide.

== U.S. House of Representatives ==
=== Elections ===
==== 2012 ====
In 2012, Love ran for Congress in Utah's 4th congressional district. The district was created after the 2010 Census. She competed for the Republican nomination against attorney Jay Cobb and State Reps. Stephen Sandstrom of Orem and Carl Wimmer of Herriman; she won the nomination on April 21, 2012, with over 70 percent of the vote. On December 15, 2011, six-term Democratic 2nd district incumbent Jim Matheson had announced that he would seek the 4th congressional district seat as well.

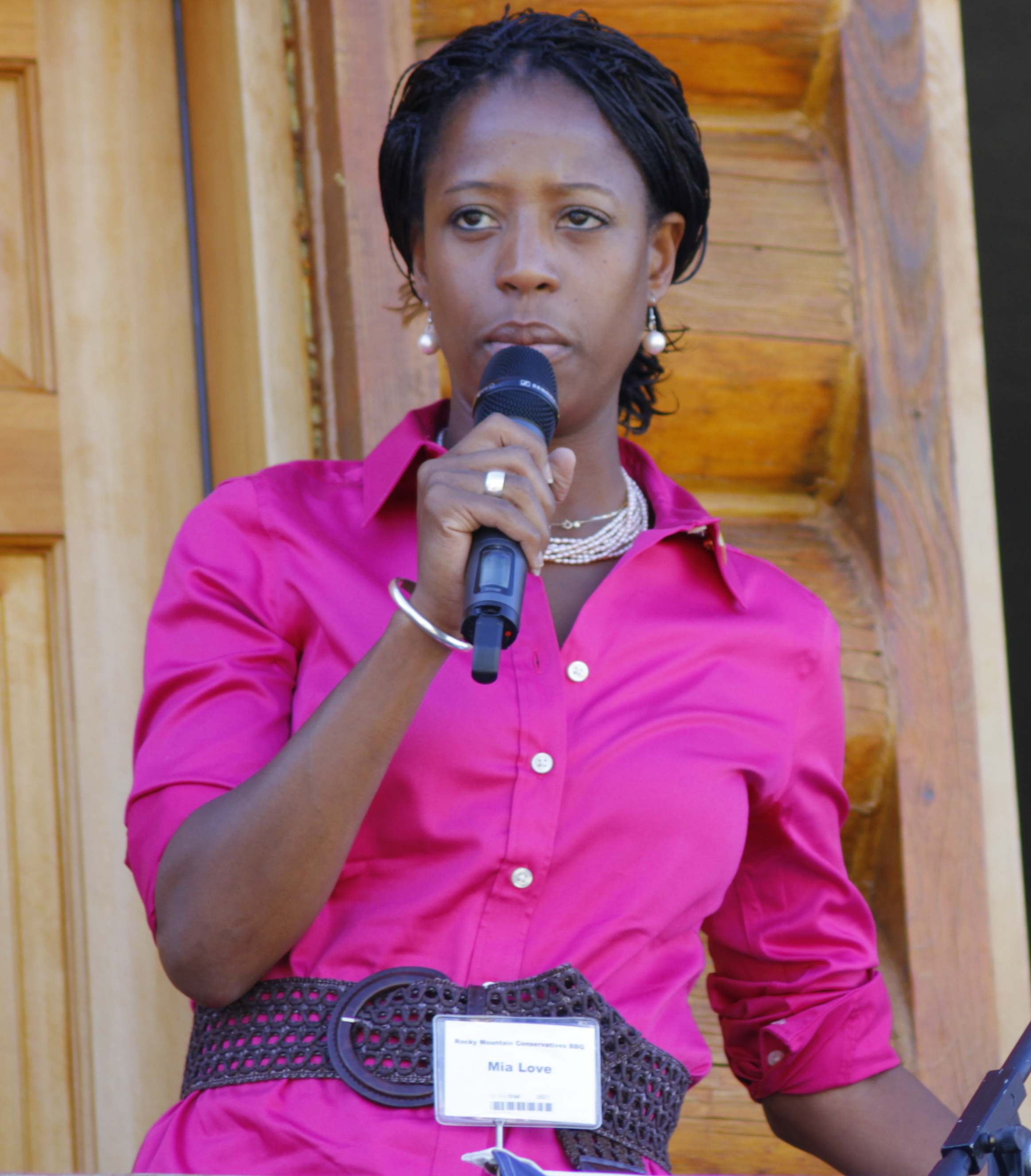
Love in 2011

Nationally, Love received campaign support from 2012 Republican presidential nominee Mitt Romney and his wife Ann Romney, House Majority Leader Eric Cantor, House Budget Committee Chairman and 2012 Republican vice presidential nominee Paul Ryan, and Speaker of the House John Boehner.

In 2012, National Journal named Love one of ten Republicans to follow on Twitter. When speaking to the 2012 Republican National Convention on August 28, 2012, she discussed lessons learned from her parents, immigrants from Haiti who fled political repression. She said, "Mr. President, I am here to tell you we are not buying what you are selling in 2012." CNN described Love as a "rising star".

In September 2012, questions arose about Love's parents' immigration status. Forbes investigated a claim in an article that month in Mother Jones that no law existed in 1976 that would have allowed Love's parents to become citizens of the United States after her birth. Forbes found that immigrants who had been residents of the Western Hemisphere could get long-term residency permits (green cards) if they had a child born in the United States. Mother Jones issued a correction. In an October 2012 interview, her father said that Mia's birth as a U.S. citizen was key to him and his wife gaining permanent legal status and ultimately citizenship.

Love lost the three-way general election to Jim Matheson by 768 votes out of 245,277 votes cast, a difference of 0.31%. Libertarian Jim Vein garnered 6,439 votes. Love was seen as having run a weak campaign, switching campaign managers three times, trying to "nationalize" the race rather than focus on local issues, and missing interviews and appointments, ostensibly because of rifts within her campaign staff.

==== 2014 ====
In May 2013, Love announced she would run for Congress again in 2014. As of July 2013, Love had raised over $475,000 for her campaign. Love was an opening speaker at the 2013 Western Conservative Summit. She spoke of the need for increased grassroots organization in the Republican Party and the need to be independent from the government.

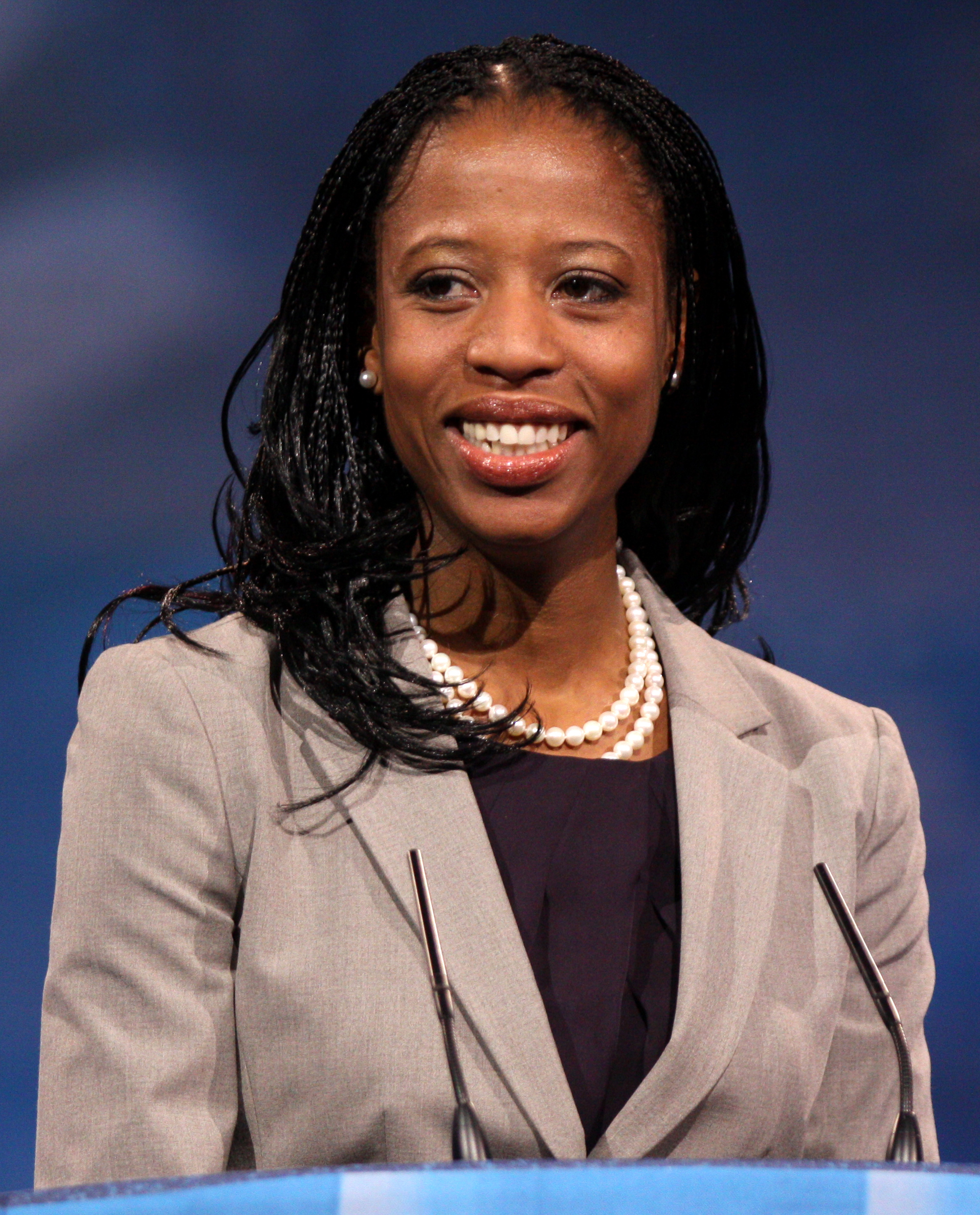
Mia Love at the 2013 CPAC in Washington, D.C.

In November 2013, Love acknowledged the growing consensus that the Tea Party movement needed to shift away from being the "party of no", disagreeing with its part in forcing a federal government shutdown over the budget.

On December 17, 2013, Matheson announced that he would not run for re-election. Love was ranked as the favored candidate due to her name recognition and district characteristics. In early October 2014, the National Journal listed Utah's 4th district as the congressional district most likely to change hands in November. In early 2014, Love was made a member of the Republican National Committee's National Advisory Council on African-American outreach.

On April 26, 2014, Love won the Republican nomination for the 4th congressional district at the Utah Republican Convention, receiving 78% of the vote. The Democratic Party nominee was Doug Owens, son of former 2nd district four-term Democratic representative Wayne Owens. On Election Day, Owens led Love in the vote count until late in the evening, when she pulled ahead and ultimately won by more than 7,000 votes. Reacting to her victory, Love joked to her supporters: "Many of the naysayers out there said that Utah would never elect a Black, Republican, (Latter-day Saint) woman to Congress. Not only did we do it, we were the first to do it."

==== 2016 ====
Love ran for re-election in 2016. She again defeated Democrat Doug Owens in the general election with 54% of the vote, over 12 points ahead of Owens. David Scott, a Democratic representative from Georgia, had given $1,000 to Love's campaign.

==== 2018 ====
Love was challenged by Salt Lake County Mayor Ben McAdams, a Democrat, in 2018. In June 2018, CNN stated that the race was considered "consequential to both parties" because Love had "stood up to President Donald Trump on immigration" and "because national Democrats [saw] McAdams as one of their best chances to gain a foothold on red turf."

For several months prior to the election, the match had been rated as a tossup by FiveThirtyEight, RealClearPolitics, and the Cook Political Report Two polls performed in October showed McAdams and Love tied, with either 45% or 46% support each, and remaining respondents undecided. For two weeks after the election, the race was too close to call, but McAdams was declared the winner on November 20, 2018, defeating Love by 694 votes. The margin was .258%, barely over the .25% threshold that would have permitted Love to request a recount.

Following her defeat, President Donald Trump mocked Love, saying, "Mia Love gave me no love, and she lost." In her concession speech, Love hit back at Trump, saying that he and others in the Republican Party had not done enough for minority voters. She added, "This election experience ... shines a spotlight on the problems Washington politicians have with minorities and Black Americans—it's transactional. It's not personal. Because Republicans never take minority communities into their home and citizens into their homes and into their hearts, those voters stay with Democrats and bureaucrats in Washington because they do take them home, or at least make them feel like they have a home."

=== Tenure ===
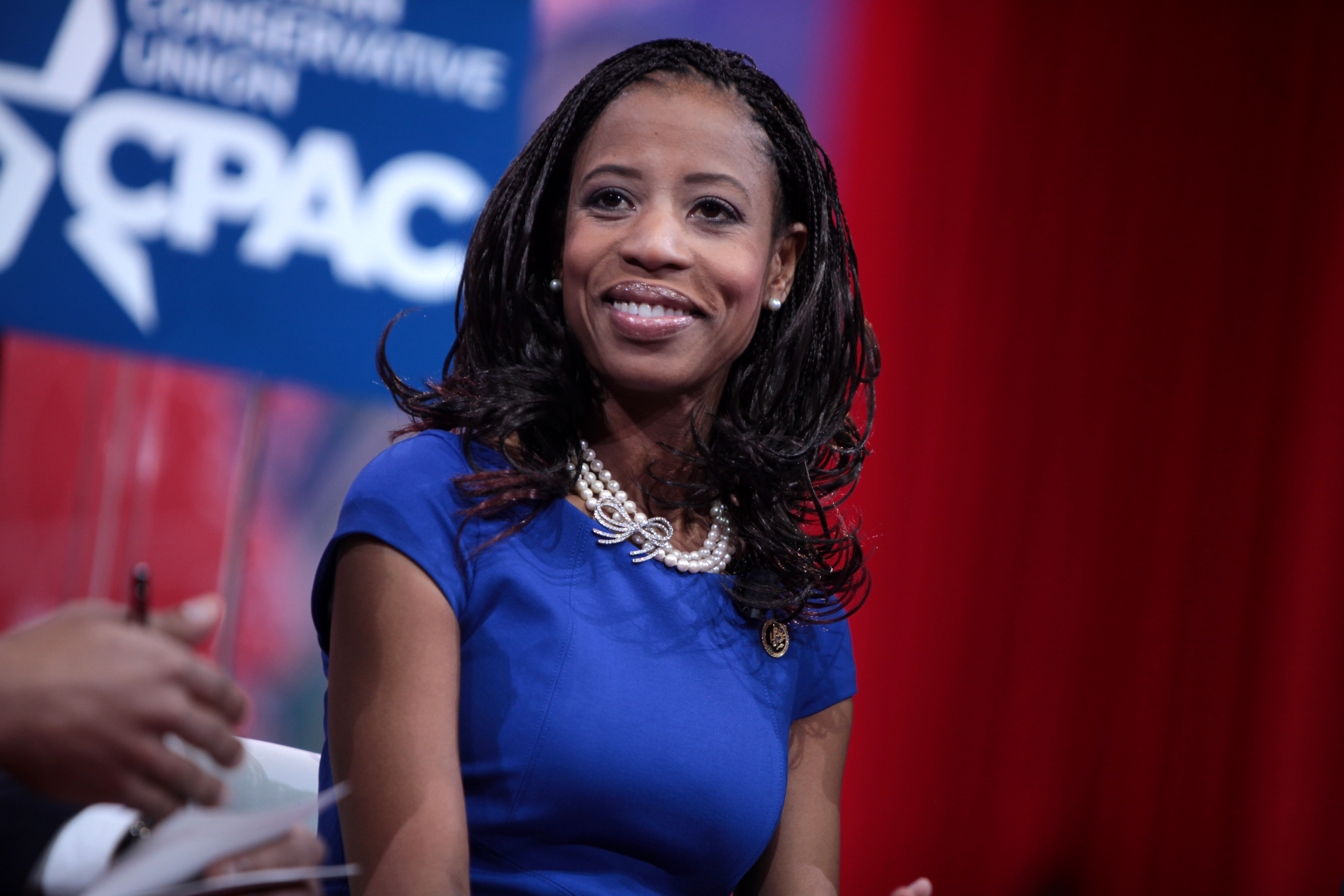
Mia Love speaking at the 2015 Conservative Political Action Conference (CPAC) in National Harbor, Maryland, on February 26, 2015

With the start of the 2015 Congress, Love was appointed to the House Financial Services Committee. Love joined the Congressional Black Caucus after taking her seat. While campaigning in 2012, Love had said that if elected, she would "join the Congressional Black Caucus and try to take that thing apart from the inside out." She described the mainly Democratic Caucus as characterized by "demagoguery. They sit there and ignite emotions and ignite racism when there isn't. They use their positions to instill fear. Hope and change is turned into fear and blame. Fear that everybody is going to lose everything and blaming Congress for everything instead of taking responsibility." She later acknowledged the bonds created with fellow caucus members. "As the only female Republican member of the Congressional Black Caucus, I have the opportunity every day to work across the aisle on issues that are divisive but important," she said. "My faith and my belief in the humanity of every one of God's children helps me to work with my Congressional Black Caucus colleagues on important issues like criminal justice reform."

In May 2015, she was a lead sponsor with Duncan D. Hunter of HR 2518, the Student Right to Know Before You Go Act, designed to increase the amount of information universities and colleges must provide prospective students. In October 2015, Love was named to serve on the Select Investigative Panel on Planned Parenthood. On two occasions in 2015, Love repaid the federal government for a travel-related expense for which she had been improperly reimbursed. In April 2016, Love got her first bill through the U.S. House. Bill HR3791, which was approved in a 247–171 vote, raised limits on how large community banks can grow; Love asserted that the move would make more credit available.

In December 2017, Love introduced the Stop Taxpayers Obligations to Perpetrators of Sexual Harassment Act. Passed by the U.S. House in February 2018, the bill would prevent members of Congress from settling sexual harassment claims with taxpayer money. In March 2018, Love became a supporter of creating federal laws against pyramid schemes. She also supported adding multivitamins to the list of items that could be purchased through the Supplemental Nutrition Assistance Program (formerly the Food Stamp Program). Love called on the U.S. Department of Education to allow state regulation of student loan providers.

In May 2018, a defense bill included language that Love co-authored. The language required the military to evaluate the effects of military policies on investigating service members who bring charges of sexual assault.

Also in the spring of 2018, Love signed a discharge petition seeking to force a floor vote on four immigration-related bills. One of the four bills would have prevented the deportation of illegal immigrants who were brought to the United States as children. This period saw Love advocating on several fronts concerning immigration. She also was the co-leader with Pramila Jayapal of an effort to keep in place rules that allowed accompanying spouses of H-4 Visa holders to have work authorization while in the United States.

In May 2018, Love's Small Bank Holding Company Relief Act became law. Love was a member of the Congressional Western Caucus and the Climate Solutions Caucus. In the lame-duck session of the 115th Congress, Love missed 71 out of 85 votes on a single weekend. She attributed her absence to caring for a sick child. It was more than any other member of Congress who lost reelection and far more than any of the three other members of Utah's congressional delegation.

== Post-congressional career ==
External videos
- After Words interview with Love on Qualified, March 10, 2023, C-SPAN

After leaving Congress, Love became a contributor at CNN. She also served as a non-residential senior fellow to The United States Studies Centre at the University of Sydney. In fall 2020, Love was appointed a fellow of the Institute of Politics and Public Service at the McCourt School of Public Policy at Georgetown University.

In the 2020 presidential election, Love voted as an elector, replacing Sean Reyes. In June 2021, Love joined the Center for Growth and Opportunity at Utah State University as the national outreach director. In August 2021, Love joined a rotating group of conservative guest hosts on the ABC daytime talk show The View for its 25th season, replacing Meghan McCain. In January 2023, Love published a memoir titled Qualified: Finding Your Voice, Leading with Character, and Empowering Others, through Hachette Book Group.

== Political positions ==
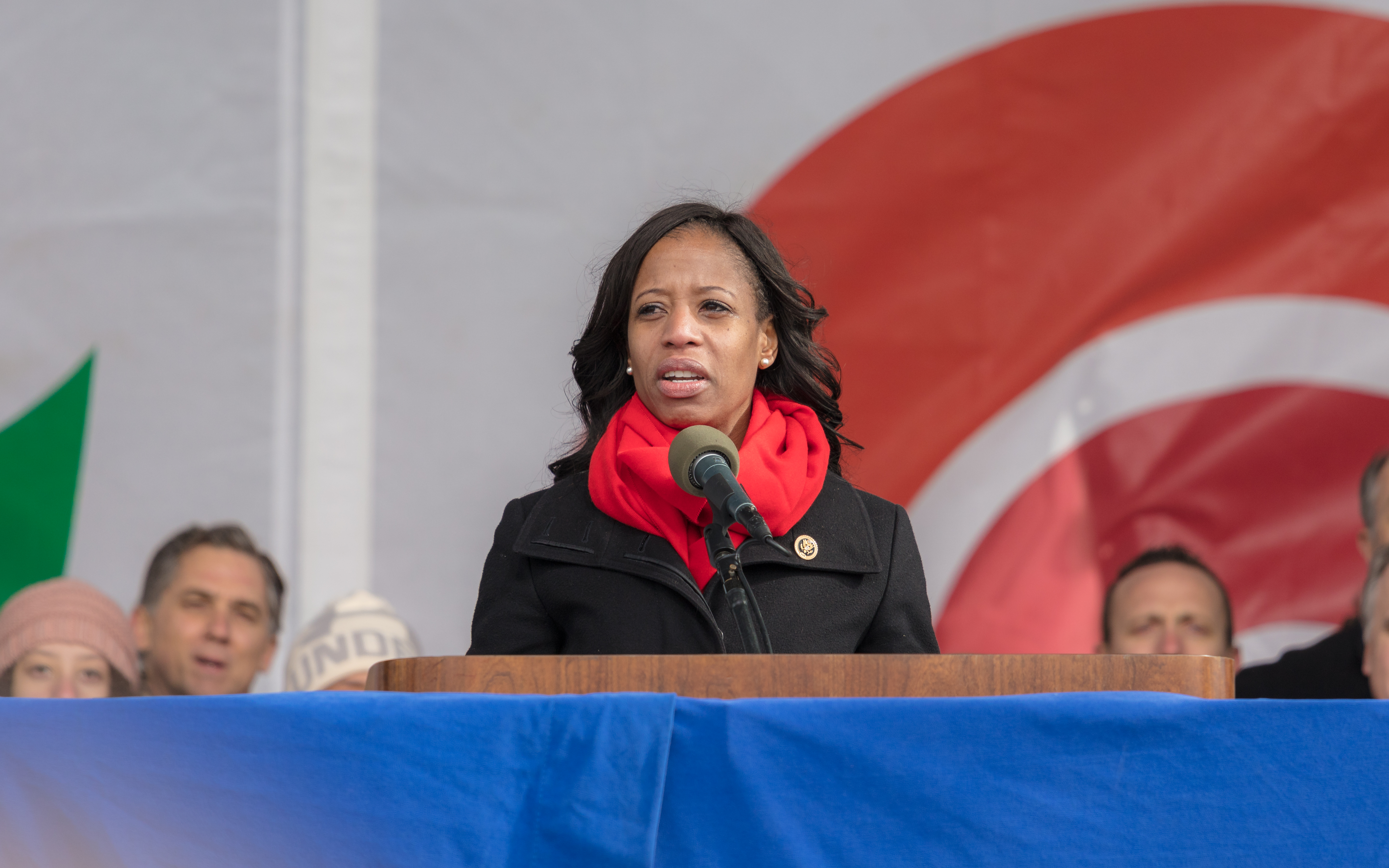
Love speaking at the 2017 March for Life in Washington, D.C.

Reuters described Love as "pro-life". Love favored repealing the Affordable Care Act, reducing federal subsidies towards healthcare, and putting caps on Medicaid spending. In 2012, Love said she would focus on opposing federal regulations, particularly those set by the Environmental Protection Agency. She supported the building of the Keystone XL pipeline. In 2014, she said she opposed the federal regulation of greenhouse gas emissions. By 2017, however, she had become a member of the Climate Solutions Caucus and stated that climate policies and economic growth are not mutually exclusive. Love supported Utah's effort to reclaim public land from federal agency controls.

=== Economic and budget issues ===
In her 2012 campaign, Love proposed dramatically reducing food entitlement spending, like free school lunches and food assistance, to pregnant mothers and people experiencing poverty. She defended these proposed cuts, stating, "I believe the best way to help the poor and the hungry is to help them get work, rather than just keep them dependent on government. We want to help them achieve their full potential."

Love proposed a blueprint to cut federal spending by $750 billion, focusing on cutting entitlements like free school lunch, special education funding, subsidized school loans, funds to prevent homelessness, healthcare subsidies, Medicaid spending, and food assistance. She referred to her proposed cuts as a "nasty-tasting medicine" needed for the country to run appropriately.

Love believed that the federal government's power should decrease. Love was described as a Tea Party conservative in 2012. In a 2015 article titled "How 'tea party' is Mia Love?", The Washington Post wrote that "Love's rhetoric from 2012 to 2014 changed a bit, even as her policy positions remained fairly constant" and noted that Love had "angered some conservatives when she questioned the tea party driven government shutdown in 2013 over Obamacare." A journalist for libertarian-leaning magazine Reason described her as a "Trojan horse libertarian" due to her stance on homeschooling, federal control of land, and other issues.

Love also supported tax cuts, cuts to foreign aid, and tort reform. Love supported the March 2015 budget, which required an increase in federal employee contributions to their retirement funds. She promoted the work of the libertarian think tank Cato Institute. Love supported cutting the Earned Income Tax Credit in half and privatizing the air traffic control system.

=== Guns and immigration ===
For the 2016 election season, Love received about $63,000 in donations from gun lobbyists and was endorsed by the National Rifle Association. In the wake of the Stoneman Douglas High School shooting, Love said she would support raising the minimum age to purchase semiautomatic rifles such as an AR-15 style rifle to age 21. She also stated that she was in favor of banning bump stocks and increasing the level of background checks required to buy guns.

Love supported immigration reform. She was a co-sponsor of the Recognizing America's Children Act, which would provide a pathway for DACA recipients to permanently remain in the country. In 2018, Love joined Democrats in seeking to force immigration-related legislation to a vote on the House floor. In June 2018, she specifically denounced the Trump administration's separation of children from their parents when they crossed into the U.S. under some circumstances.

=== Donald Trump ===
On October 8, 2016, following the release of a damaging video depicting then-presidential nominee Donald Trump having a lewd conversation about women, Love stated publicly that she would not vote for Trump in the presidential election. In addition, Love urged Trump to withdraw from the race for the good of the Republican Party and the country.

According to political polling and reporting website FiveThirtyEight, Love's votes aligned with Trump's positions around 96% of the time during the 115th Congress. In early 2018, Love joined other Utah political leaders in expressing opposition to President Trump's proposed tariffs on steel and aluminum. In a concession speech following her 2018 defeat, Love asserted that Trump and others in the Republican Party had not done enough for minority voters. Love supported Trump in the 2024 United States presidential election.

== Personal life ==
Raised Catholic, Love joined the Church of Jesus Christ of Latter-day Saints after graduating from college in 1998. While working as a flight attendant in 1998, she moved to Utah as part of her work. She also wanted to strengthen her faith, and be closer to a temple.

While in Utah, Love dated Jason Love, whom she had met previously when he was a missionary for the Church in Connecticut. Jason and Mia Love were married in December 1998, four months after their first date. When first married, the Loves lived in American Fork, Utah; they later moved to Saratoga Springs. The Loves had three children together. After Love was elected to Congress, the Loves decided that Jason should continue his software work and maintain the couple's residence in Utah. Their three children continued to attend school in Utah, and Love used video calling and frequent return trips to Utah to remain in touch with her family.

== Death ==
In February 2022, Love was diagnosed with glioblastoma, a form of brain cancer, and doctors predicted she had ten to fifteen months to live. She had surgery, which removed 95% of the tumor. By August 2023, she was enrolled in an immunotherapy clinical trial. At that juncture the tumor was shrinking. On March 1, 2025, Love's daughter announced on social media that the treatments were no longer effective against the tumor, and the family was moving "from treatment to enjoying [their] remaining time with her". Mia Love died at her home on March 23, 2025, at the age of 49. Her memorial service was held on April 7, 2025, in Salt Lake City.

== Electoral history ==
Utah's 4th congressional district election, 2018
Party	Candidate	Votes	%
Democratic	Ben McAdams	134,964	50.1
Republican	Mia B. Love (incumbent)	134,270	49.9
Total votes		269,271	100.0
Democratic gain from Republican			

Utah's 4th congressional district election, 2016
Party	Candidate	Votes	%
Republican	Mia B. Love (incumbent)	147,597	53.76
Democratic	Doug Owens	113,413	41.30
Constitution	Collin R. Simonsen	13,559	4.94
Total votes		274,569	100.0
Republican hold			

Utah's 4th congressional district election, 2014
Party	Candidate	Votes	%
Republican	Mia B. Love	74,936	50.92
Democratic	Doug Owens	67,425	45.81
Independent American	Tim Aalders	2,032	1.38
Constitution	Collin Simonsen	1,424	0.97
Libertarian	Jim L. Vein	1,351	0.92
Total votes		146,968	100.00
Republican gain from Democratic			

Utah's 4th congressional district election, 2012
Party	Candidate	Votes	%
Democratic	Jim Matheson (2nd district incumbent running in new district)	119,803	48.84
Republican	Mia B. Love	119,035	48.53
Libertarian	Jim L. Vein	6,439	2.63
Total votes		245,277	100.0
Democratic win (new seat)			

== Publications ==
- Love, Mia (2023). Qualified: Finding Your Voice, Leading with Character, and Empowering Others. Nashville: Center Street. ISBN 978-1-5460-0326-7. OCLC 1340656181.

== See also ==
- List of African-American United States representatives
- List of United States representatives from Utah
- Politics of Utah
- United States House of Representatives
- Women in the United States House of Representatives

U.S. House of Representatives
Preceded by Jim Matheson	Member of the U.S. House of Representatives from Utah's 4th congressional district 2015–2019	Succeeded by Ben McAdams
