= 2024 Utah State Auditor election =

- November 5, 2024
Nominee	Tina Cannon	Catherine Voutaz	Jeffrey Ostler
Party	Republican	Democratic	Constitution
Popular vote	906,531	446,608	73,741
Percentage	63.53%	31.30%	5.17%
- Cannon: 40–50% 50–60% 60–70% 70–80% 80–90% Voutaz: 40–50% 50–60%
State Auditor before election
John Dougall
Republican
Elected State Auditor
Tina Cannon
Republican

The 2024 Utah State Auditor election took place on November 5, 2024, to elect the next state auditor of Utah. Incumbent Republican auditor John Dougall did not seek re-election, instead opting to run for U.S. House. Primary elections took place on June 25, 2024.

== Republican primary ==
=== Candidates ===
==== Nominee ====
- Tina Cannon, former Morgan County councilor and candidate for Utah's 1st congressional district in 2020 and 2022

==== Eliminated in primary ====
- Ricky Hatch, Weber County Clerk/Auditor

==== Declined ====
- John Dougall, incumbent state auditor (ran for U.S. House)

=== Results ===
==== Convention ====
State Republican Convention results, 2024
Candidate	First ballot	Pct.
Ricky Hatch	1,933	51.3%
Tina Cannon	1,834	48.7%
Total	3,767	100.0%

==== Primary ====
Results by county: Cannon: 50–60%; 60–70%; Hatch: 50–60%; 60–70%

Republican primary results
Party	Candidate	Votes	%
Republican	Tina Cannon	226,479	56.96%
Republican	Ricky Hatch	171,144	43.04%
Total votes		397,623	100.00%

== Democratic primary ==
=== Candidates ===
==== Nominee ====
- Catherine Voutaz, accountant

== Constitution convention ==
=== Candidates ===
==== Nominee ====
- Jeffrey Ostler, businessman and perennial candidate

== General election ==
=== Results ===
2024 Utah State Auditor election
Party	Candidate	Votes	%
Republican	Tina Cannon	906,531	63.53%
Democratic	Catherine Voutaz	446,608	31.30%
Constitution	Jeffrey Ostler	73,741	5.17%
Total votes		1,426,880	100.00%

==== By county ====
County	Tina Cannon Republican		Catherine Voutaz Democratic		Jeffrey Ostler Constitution		Margin		Total
County	#	%	#	%	#	%	#	%	Total
Beaver	2,589	83.81%	314	10.17%	186	6.02%	2,275	73.65%	3,089
Box Elder	22,577	79.93%	3,800	13.45%	1,868	6.61%	18,777	66.48%	28,245
Cache	41,060	70.84%	13,831	23.86%	3,069	5.30%	27,229	46.98%	57,960
Carbon	6,346	69.39%	2,294	25.08%	505	5.52%	4,052	44.31%	9,145
Daggett	414	80.39%	77	14.95%	24	4.66%	337	65.44%	515
Davis	105,079	65.30%	43,968	27.32%	11,876	7.38%	61,111	37.98%	160,923
Duchesne	7,315	83.82%	793	9.09%	619	7.09%	6,522	74.73%	8,727
Emery	4,174	85.52%	503	10.31%	204	4.18%	3,671	75.21%	4,881
Garfield	2,159	80.29%	429	15.95%	101	3.76%	1,730	64.34%	2,689
Grand	2,363	46.33%	2,581	50.61%	156	3.06%	-218	-4.27%	5,100
Iron	20,982	78.04%	4,427	16.47%	1,478	5.50%	16,555	61.57%	26,887
Juab	5,271	84.21%	576	9.20%	412	6.58%	4,695	75.01%	6,259
Kane	3,135	74.11%	963	22.77%	132	3.12%	2,172	51.35%	4,230
Millard	5,268	84.52%	527	8.45%	438	7.03%	4,741	76.06%	6,233
Morgan	4,876	72.97%	1,042	15.59%	764	11.43%	3,834	57.38%	6,682
Piute	821	89.73%	65	7.10%	29	3.17%	756	82.62%	915
Rich	1,167	84.63%	159	11.53%	53	3.84%	1,008	73.10%	1,379
Salt Lake	237,159	48.88%	227,970	46.99%	20,057	4.13%	9,189	1.89%	485,186
San Juan	3,577	58.70%	2,241	36.77%	276	4.53%	1,336	21.92%	6,094
Sanpete	10,183	80.80%	1,438	11.41%	981	7.78%	8,745	69.39%	12,602
Sevier	9,176	86.57%	909	8.58%	514	4.85%	8,267	78.00%	10,599
Summit	11,582	47.65%	12,023	49.46%	702	2.89%	-441	-1.81%	24,307
Tooele	22,176	68.85%	7,740	24.03%	2,293	7.12%	14,436	44.82%	32,209
Uintah	12,669	82.65%	1,557	10.16%	1,102	7.19%	11,112	72.49%	15,328
Utah	212,000	73.85%	59,852	20.85%	15,216	5.30%	152,148	53.00%	287,068
Wasatch	12,142	68.37%	4,924	27.73%	694	3.91%	7,218	40.64%	17,760
Washington	72,185	76.63%	17,866	18.97%	4,146	4.40%	54,319	57.67%	94,197
Wayne	1,208	76.65%	309	19.61%	59	3.74%	899	57.04%	1,576
Weber	66,878	63.04%	33,430	31.51%	5,787	5.45%	33,448	31.53%	106,095
Totals	906,531	63.53%	446,608	31.30%	73,741	5.17%	459,923	32.23%	1,426,880

Counties that flipped from Republican to Democratic

- Grand (largest municipality: Moab)
- Summit (largest city: Park City)

==== By congressional district ====
Cannon won all four congressional districts.

District	Cannon	Voutaz	Ostler	Representative
1st	62%	32%	6%	Blake Moore
2nd	62%	33%	5%	Celeste Maloy
3rd	64%	31%	5%	John Curtis (118th Congress)
3rd	64%	31%	5%	Mike Kennedy (119th Congress)
4th	66%	29%	5%	Burgess Owens

== See also ==
- 2024 Utah elections
