= 2024 Utah elections =

The 2024 Utah elections were held on Tuesday, November 5, 2024. The primary elections were held on June 25, 2024.

In addition to the U.S. presidential race, Utah voters elected their Class I U.S. senator, Governor of Utah, nine seats of its Board of Education, four of Utah's other executive officers, all of its seats to the House of Representatives, all of the seats of the Utah House of Representatives, 15 of 29 seats in the Utah State Senate, and two ballot measures.

== Federal offices ==
=== President of the United States ===
Utah, a stronghold for the Republican Party and thus a reliable "red state", has six electoral votes in the Electoral College.

Incumbent Joe Biden won the Democratic primary. Donald Trump won the Republican caucus with 56.4% of the vote against Nikki Haley's 42.7% of the vote. Trump won the presidential election in Utah with 59.4% of the vote, and all six of Utah's electors voted for Trump.

=== United States class I Senate seat ===
One-term Republican incumbent senator Mitt Romney had announced he would retire.

John Curtis won the Republican primary and won the election against Democrat Caroline Gleich.

=== United States House of Representatives ===
All four of Utah's seats in the U.S. House of Representatives were up for election. Incumbent Representative John Curtis (R) from the 3rd district announced that he will not seek re-election, and instead ran for the Senate. His seat was won by Republican Mike Kennedy. The other seats were won by Republican incumbents Blake Moore, Celeste Maloy, and Burgess Owens.

== Governor ==
Incumbent governor Spencer Cox ran for re-election to a second term. He won against Democrat Brian King.

== Attorney general ==
Incumbent attorney general Sean Reyes announced he will not seek re-election to a third term. Derek Brown won the Republican primary and the election.

== State Auditor ==
Incumbent state auditor John Dougall announced he will not seek re-election. Tina Cannon won the Republican primary and the election.

== Treasurer ==
Incumbent state treasurer Marlo Oaks announced he will seek re-election to a full term. He won the election against Neil Hansen.

== State legislature ==
All 75 seats of the Utah House of Representatives and 15 of 29 seats of the Utah State Senate were up for election. The composition of the Utah State Legislature prior to and following the election are as follows:

Utah Senate
Party	Leader	Before	After	Change
Republican	J. Stuart Adams	23	23	Steady
Democratic	Luz Escamilla	6	6	Steady
Total		29	29	Steady

Utah House of Representatives
Party	Leader	Before	After	Change
Republican	Mike Schultz	61	61	Steady
Democratic	Angela Romero	14	14	Steady
Total		75	75	Steady

== Ballot measures ==
Two ballot measures were voted on.

=== Amendment B ===
Increases the annual distributions from the State School Fund for public education from 4% to 5% [98% of votes counted]
Choice	Votes	%
For	1,004,901	71.38
Against	402,865	28.62
Total	1,407,766	100.00

Amendment B results by county Yes: 70–80%; 60–70%; 50–60%

=== Amendment C ===
Mandates that all County Sheriffs be elected by voters. [98% of votes counted]
Choice	Votes	%
For	1,165,753	82.68
Against	244,196	17.32
Total	1,409,949	100.00

Amendment C results by county Yes: 90–100%; 80–90%; 70–80%

=== Amendments A and D ===
Two other ballot measures, one proposing to overturn the court decision in League of Women Voters v. Utah State Legislature and one proposing redirecting tax money, were present on the ballot but votes for them were not counted due to legal challenges.
