= 2024 United States House of Representatives elections in Utah =

- November 5, 2024

All 4 Utah seats to the United States House of Representatives
	Majority party	Minority party
Party	Republican	Democratic
Last election	4	0
Seats won	4	0
Seat change	Steady	Steady
Popular vote	909,332	471,051
Percentage	62.77%	32.52%
Swing	▼0.31%	▲0.32%

Republican
50–60%
60–70%
70–80%
80–90%
Democratic
40–50%
50–60%

The 2024 United States House of Representatives elections in Utah were held on November 5, 2024, to elect the four U.S. representatives from the State of Utah, one from each of the state's congressional districts. The elections coincided with the 2024 U.S. presidential election, as well as other elections to the House of Representatives, elections to the United States Senate, and various state and local elections. The primary elections were held on June 25, 2024.

== Overview ==
=== Statewide ===
Party	Candi- dates	Votes		Seats	
Party	Candi- dates	No.	%	No.	+/–
Republican Party	4	909,332	62.77%	4	Steady
Democratic Party	4	471,051	32.52%	0	Steady
Constitution Party	1	19,650	1.36%	0	Steady
Libertarian Party	1	17,601	1.21%	0	Steady
United Utah Party	1	17,347	1.20%	0	Steady
Independents	2	13,696	0.95%	0	Steady
Total	13	1,448,677	100.00%	4	Steady

Popular vote
Republican	62.77%
Democratic	32.52%
Other	4.71%

House seats
Republican	100.0%

=== District ===
Results of the 2024 United States House of Representatives elections in Utah by district:

District	Republican		Democratic		Others		Total		Result
District	Votes	%	Votes	%	Votes	%	Votes	%	Result
District 1	230,975	63.13%	117,319	32.06%	17,601	4.81%	365,895	100.00%	Republican hold
District 2	205,234	58.00%	121,114	34.23%	27,490	7.77%	353,838	100.00%	Republican hold
District 3	242,496	66.39%	122,780	33.61%	–	–	365,276	100.00%	Republican hold
District 4	230,627	63.42%	109,838	30.20%	23,203	6.38%	363,668	100.00%	Republican hold
Total	909,332	62.77%	471,051	32.52%	68,294	4.71%	1,448,677	100.00%	

== District 1 ==
2024 Utah's 1st congressional district election
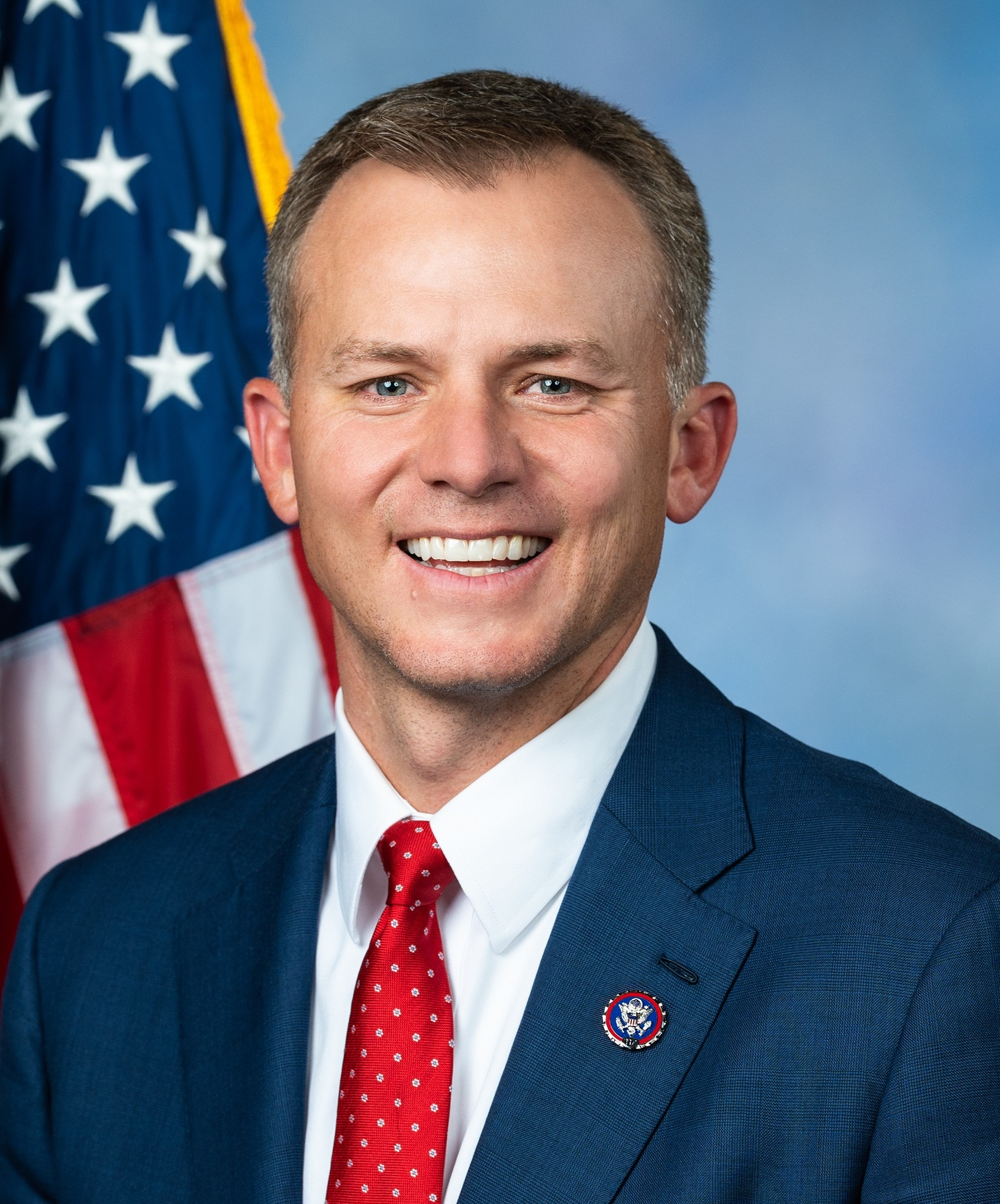

Nominee	Blake Moore	Bill Campbell
Party	Republican	Democratic
Popular vote	230,975	117,319
Percentage	63.1%	32.1%
- Moore: 40–50% 50–60% 60–70% 70–80% >90% Campbell: 40–50% 50–60% 60–70% 70–80% 80–90% Tie: 40–50% 50% No votes
U.S. Representative before election
Blake Moore
Republican
Elected U.S. Representative
Blake Moore
Republican

The 1st district is located in northern Utah, including the cities of Ogden, Logan, Park City, Layton, Clearfield, and the northern half of the Great Salt Lake. The incumbent is Republican Blake Moore, who was re-elected with 66.97% of the vote in 2022.

=== Republican primary ===
==== Nominee ====
- Blake Moore, incumbent U.S. representative

==== Eliminated in primary ====
- Paul Miller, electrician

==== Eliminated at convention ====
- Derek Draper, retired police officer

==== Endorsements ====
Blake Moore

Organizations

- AIPAC

==== Fundraising ====
Campaign finance reports as of June 5, 2024
Candidate	Raised	Spent	Cash on hand
Paul Miller (R)	$4,706	$6,080	$0
Blake Moore (R)	$1,724,526	$1,118,716	$1,071,854
Source: Federal Election Commission

==== Convention ====
State Republican convention results, 2024
Candidate	Round 1		Round 2	
Candidate	Votes	%	Votes	%
Paul Miller	292	33.56%	446	54.86%
Blake Moore	394	45.29%	367	45.14%
Derek Draper	184	21.15%	Eliminated	
Inactive Ballots	0 ballots		3 ballots	

==== Debate ====
2024 Utah's 1st congressional district republican primary debate
No.	Date	Host	Moderator	Link	Republican	Republican
Key: P Participant A Absent N Not invited I Invited W Withdrawn						
Key: P Participant A Absent N Not invited I Invited W Withdrawn					Paul Miller	Blake Moore
1	Jun. 10, 2024	Utah Debate Commission	Julie Rose		P	P

==== Results ====
Results by county: Moore: 60–70%; 70–80%; 80–90%

Republican primary results
Party	Candidate	Votes	%
Republican	Blake Moore (incumbent)	72,702	71.0
Republican	Paul Miller	29,640	29.0
Total votes		102,342	100.0

=== Democratic primary ===
==== Nominee ====
- Bill Campbell, accountant and Republican candidate for this district in 2022

==== Fundraising ====
Campaign finance reports as of April 7, 2024
Candidate	Raised	Spent	Cash on hand
Bill Campbell (D)	$34,000	$13,728	$15,136
Source: Federal Election Commission

=== Libertarian primary ===
==== Nominee ====
- Daniel Cottam, surgeon and nominee for governor in 2020

=== General election ===
==== Debate ====
2024 Utah's 1st congressional district debate
No.	Date	Host	Moderator	Link	Republican	Democratic	Libertarian
Key: P Participant A Absent N Not invited I Invited W Withdrawn							
Key: P Participant A Absent N Not invited I Invited W Withdrawn					Blake Moore	Bill Campbell	Daniel Cottman
1	Oct. 8, 2024	Utah Debate Commission	Natalie Gochnour		P	P	P

==== Predictions ====
Source	Ranking	As of
The Cook Political Report	Solid R	December 30, 2023
Inside Elections	Solid R	January 3, 2024
Sabato's Crystal Ball	Safe R	November 16, 2023
Elections Daily	Safe R	October 26, 2023
CNalysis	Solid R	December 28, 2023

==== Polling ====
Poll source	Date(s) administered	Sample size (Note: Key: A – all adults RV – registered voters LV – likely voters V – unclear)	Margin of error	Blake Moore (R)	Bill Campbell (D)	Daniel Cottam (L)	Undecided
Lighthouse Research (Note: Poll sponsored by the Utah Debate Commission)	August 29 – September 19, 2024	507 (RV)	± 4.4%	58%	28%	7%	7%

==== Results ====
2024 Utah's 1st congressional district election
Party	Candidate	Votes	%
Republican	Blake Moore (incumbent)	230,975	63.1
Democratic	Bill Campbell	117,319	32.1
Libertarian	Daniel Cottam	17,601	4.8
Total votes		365,895	100.0
Republican hold			

== District 2 ==
2024 Utah's 2nd congressional district election
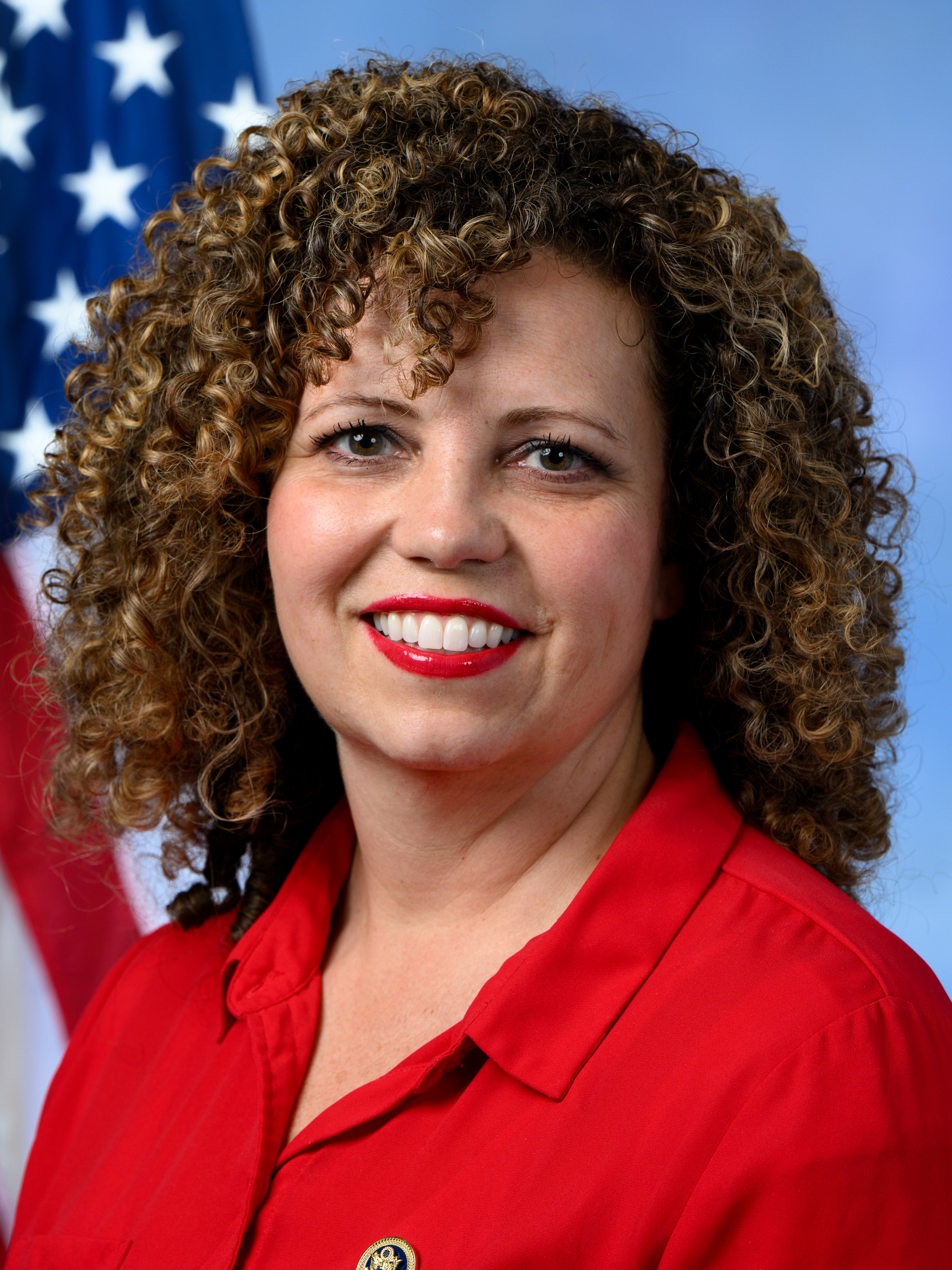

Nominee	Celeste Maloy	Nathaniel Woodward	Cassie Easley
Party	Republican	Democratic	Constitution
Popular vote	205,234	121,114	19,650
Percentage	58.0%	34.2%	5.6%
- Maloy: 40–50% 50–60% 60–70% 70–80% >90% Woodward: 40–50% 50–60% 60–70% 70–80% 80–90% Tie: 40–50% No votes
U.S. Representative before election
Celeste Maloy
Republican
Elected U.S. Representative
Celeste Maloy
Republican

The 2nd district includes rural southwestern Utah and parts of the Salt Lake City metropolitan area. The incumbent is Republican Celeste Maloy, who won the special election to replace Chris Stewart with 57.1% of the vote.

=== Republican primary ===
==== Nominee ====
- Celeste Maloy, incumbent U.S. representative

==== Eliminated in primary ====
- Colby Jenkins, telecommunications executive

==== Withdrawn ====
- Tyrone Jensen, political commentator and perennial candidate (endorsed Jenkins)

==== Declined ====
- Chris Stewart, former U.S. representative

==== Endorsements ====
Colby Jenkins

U.S. senators

- Mike Lee, U.S. senator from Utah (2011–present)
- Rand Paul, U.S. senator from Kentucky (2011–present)

Individuals

- Vivek Ramaswamy, pharmaceutical executive and 2024 Republican presidential candidate

Political parties

- Utah Republican Party

Organizations

- House Freedom Fund
Celeste Maloy

Executive branch officials

- David Bernhardt, former U.S. Secretary of the Interior (2019–2021)
- Robert O'Brien, former U.S. National Security Advisor (2019–2021)
- Donald Trump, 45th President of the United States (2017–2021)

U.S. representatives

- John Curtis, U.S. representative from Utah's 3rd congressional district (2017–present)
- Jim Jordan, U.S. representative from Ohio's 4th congressional district (2007–present)
- Blake Moore, U.S. representative from Utah's 1st congressional district (2021–present)
- Burgess Owens, U.S. representative from Utah's 4th congressional district (2021–present)

Organizations

- AIPAC
- National Right to Life Committee
- Pro-Israel America

==== Fundraising ====
Campaign finance reports as of June 5, 2024
Candidate	Raised	Spent	Cash on hand
Colby Jenkins (R)	$378,602	$296,400	$82,201
Celeste Maloy (R)	$1,407,798	$1,240,908	$166,889
Source: Federal Election Commission

==== Convention ====
State Republican Convention results, 2024
Candidate	First ballot	Pct.
Colby Jenkins	469	56.85%
Celeste Maloy	356	43.15%
Inactive Ballots	1 ballot	

==== Debate ====
2024 Utah's 2nd congressional district republican primary debate
No.	Date	Host	Moderator	Link	Republican	Republican
Key: P Participant A Absent N Not invited I Invited W Withdrawn						
Key: P Participant A Absent N Not invited I Invited W Withdrawn					Colby Jenkins	Celeste Maloy
1	Jun. 10, 2024	Utah Debate Commission	Rod Arquette		P	P

==== Results ====
Results by county: Maloy: 50–60%; 70–80%; Jenkins: 50–60%

Republican primary results
Party	Candidate	Votes	%
Republican	Celeste Maloy (incumbent)	53,777	50.1
Republican	Colby Jenkins	53,601	49.9
Total votes		107,378	100.0

==== Recount ====
When polls closed on June 25, the primary proved to be closer than expected, as no winner was declared while votes continued to be tallied. When the results were updated on July 10, Maloy was ahead of Jenkins by only 219 votes, which was less than 0.25% of the total vote, the threshold for which the state initiates an automatic recount. Jenkins officially asked for a recount on July 29.

=== Democratic primary ===
Brian Adams was the only Democrat to file. He faced backlash from fellow Democrats for his anti-abortion beliefs, his opposition to president Joe Biden and support for independent presidential candidate Robert F. Kennedy Jr., and for describing convicted January 6 Capitol attack participants as "politically persecuted." As a result, Adams withdrew after receiving the Democratic nomination. Democratic central committee members in the 2nd district met to choose a replacement nominee on May 25. Out of eight candidates, committee members chose lawyer Nathaniel Woodward after five rounds of ranked-choice voting. In the final round, Woodward defeated the runner-up, Garret Rushforth, by just 1 vote.

==== Withdrew after nomination ====
- Brian Adams, renewable energy consultant

==== Replacement nominee ====
- Nathaniel Woodward, chair of the Carbon County Democratic Party

==== Not nominated ====
- Benjamin Coffey, project engineer
- Darrell Curtis, former nonprofit employee
- Charles Free, cab driver
- Randy Hopkins, retired Utah Department of Workforce Services regional director and candidate for this district in 2018 and 2020
- Schuyler Rhodes, chair of the Iron County Democratic Party
- Garret Rushforth, teacher
- Warren Wright, veteran

=== Constitution primary ===
==== Nominee ====
- Cassie Easley, vice chair of the Utah Constitution Party and nominee for this district in 2022 and 2023

=== General election ===
==== Predictions ====
Source	Ranking	As of
The Cook Political Report	Solid R	December 30, 2023
Inside Elections	Solid R	January 3, 2024
Sabato's Crystal Ball	Safe R	November 16, 2023
Elections Daily	Safe R	October 26, 2023
CNalysis	Solid R	December 28, 2023

==== Polling ====
Poll source	Date(s) administered	Sample size	Margin of error	Celeste Maloy (R)	Nathaniel Woodward (D)	Undecided
Lighthouse Research	August 29 – September 19, 2024	512 (RV)	± 4.3%	58%	25%	17%

==== Results ====
2024 Utah's 2nd congressional district election
Party	Candidate	Votes	%
Republican	Celeste Maloy (incumbent)	205,234	58.0
Democratic	Nathaniel Woodward	121,114	34.2
Constitution	Cassie Easley	19,650	5.6
Independent	Tyler Murset	7,840	2.2
Total votes		353,838	100.0
Republican hold			

== District 3 ==
2024 Utah's 3rd congressional district election
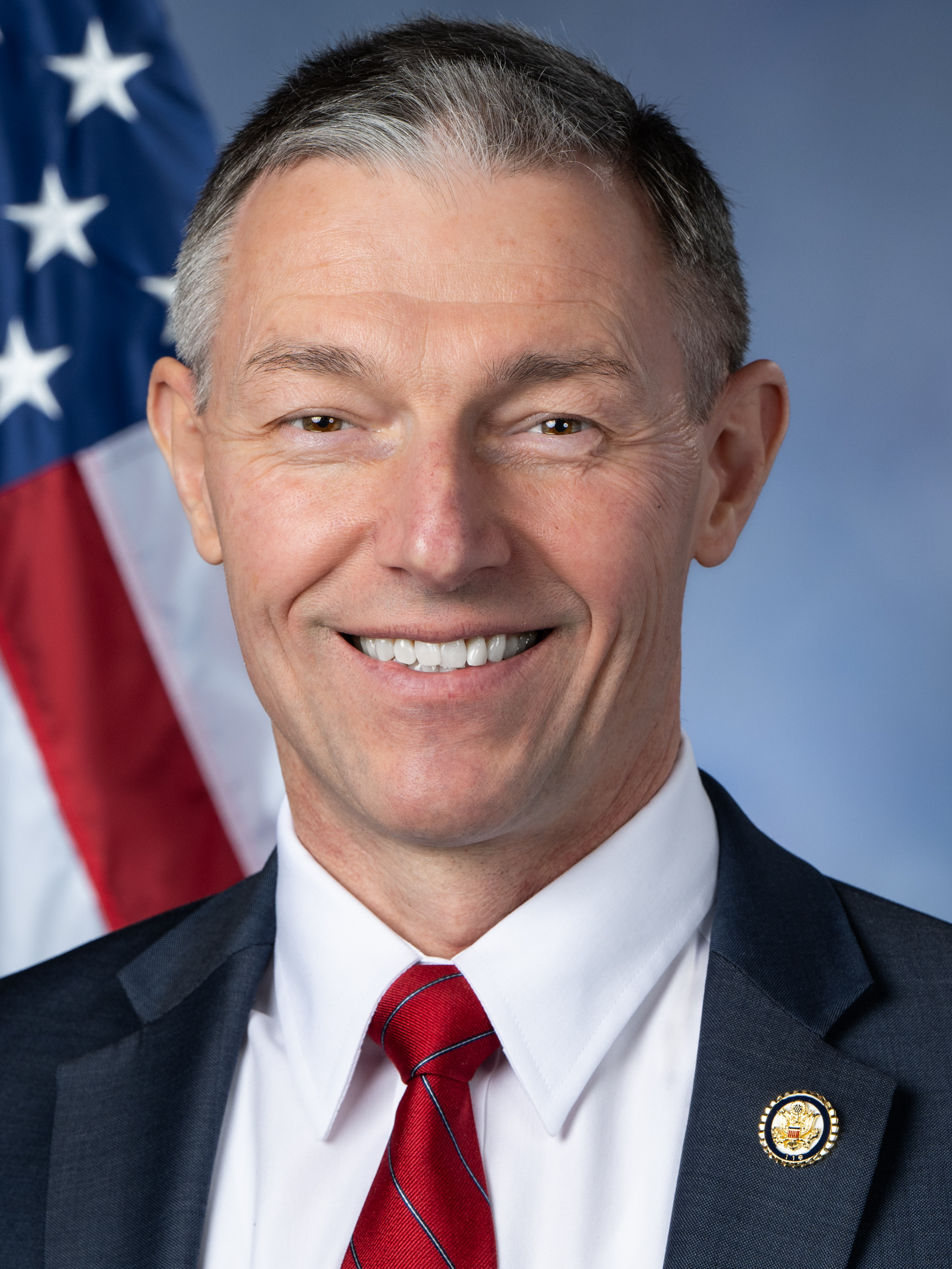

Nominee	Mike Kennedy	Glenn Wright
Party	Republican	Democratic
Popular vote	242,496	122,780
Percentage	66.4%	33.6%
- Kennedy: 50–60% 60–70% 70–80% >90% Wright: 50–60% 60–70% 70–80% 80–90% >90% Tie: 50% No votes
U.S. Representative before election
John Curtis
Republican
Elected U.S. Representative
Mike Kennedy
Republican

The 3rd district includes rural southeastern Utah, stretches into the Provo-Orem metro area, and takes in the southeastern Salt Lake City suburbs of Holladay, Cottonwood Heights, Sandy, and Draper. The incumbent is Republican John Curtis, who was re-elected with 66.49% of the vote in 2022. He is not seeking re-election, instead choosing to run for the U.S. Senate to succeed Republican incumbent Mitt Romney.

=== Republican primary ===
==== Nominee ====
- Mike Kennedy, state senator from the 21st district (2021–present) and candidate for U.S. Senate in 2018

==== Eliminated in primary ====
- Rod Bird, mayor of Roosevelt
- John Dougall, Utah State Auditor (2013–2025)
- Case Lawrence, founder of CircusTrix
- Stewart Peay, former chair of the Utah County Republican Party, nephew-in-law of U.S. Senator Mitt Romney, and candidate for this district in 2017

==== Eliminated at convention ====
- Lucky Bovo, commercial pilot and candidate for U.S. Senate in 2022
- Kathryn Dahlin, former legislative assistant to U.S. Senator Bob Bennett
- Chris Herrod, former state representative from the 62nd district (2007–2013) and candidate for this district in 2017, 2018, and 2022
- Zac Wilson, chair of Utah Young Republicans

==== Withdrawn ====
- John Curtis, incumbent U.S. representative (ran for U.S. Senate)
- Clayton Hunsaker

==== Endorsements ====
Mike Kennedy

U.S. Senators

- Mike Lee, Utah (2011–present)

Political parties

- Utah Republican Party

Labor unions

- Utah Fraternal Order of Police
Stewart Peay

U.S. Senators

- Mitt Romney, Utah (2019–2025) (candidate's uncle-in-law)

U.S. representatives

- Chris Stewart, UT-02 (2013–2023)

==== Fundraising ====
Campaign finance reports as of June 5, 2024
Candidate	Raised	Spent	Cash on hand
Rod Bird (R)	$1,204,866 (Note: $1,014,797 of this total was self-funded by Bird)	$1,056,938	$147,928
John Dougall (R)	$383,194 (Note: $250,000 of this total was self-funded by Dougall)	$347,963	$35,231
Mike Kennedy (R)	$586,936 (Note: $156,000 of this total was self-funded by Kennedy)	$378,456	$208,480
Case Lawrence (R)	$2,820,927 (Note: $2,450,000 of this total was self-funded by Lawrence)	$2,794,065	$26,861
Stewart Peay (R)	$199,499	$100,040	$99,458
Source: Federal Election Commission

==== Convention ====
State Republican convention results, 2024
Candidate	Round 1		Round 2		Round 3		Round 4		Round 5		Round 6	
Candidate	Votes	%	Votes	%	Votes	%	Votes	%	Votes	%	Votes	%
Mike Kennedy	367	38.59%	407	44.00%	471	52.39%	497	55.28%	528	59.59%	537	61.51%
Zac Wilson	75	7.89%	85	9.19%	87	9.68%	167	18.58%	226	25.51%	336	38.49%
Rod Bird	171	17.98%	185	20.00%	172	19.13%	129	14.35%	132	14.90%	Eliminated	
Kathryn Dahlin	75	7.89%	76	8.22%	78	8.68%	73	8.12%	Eliminated			
Stewart Peay	69	7.26%	62	6.70%	47	5.23%	33	3.67%	Eliminated			
John Dougall	78	8.20%	65	7.03%	44	4.89%	Eliminated					
Chris Herrod	64	6.73%	45	4.86%	Eliminated							
Case Lawrence	48	5.05%	Eliminated									
Lucky Bovo	4	0.42%	Eliminated									
Inactive Ballots	0 ballots		0 ballots		2 ballots		2 ballots		7 ballots		4 ballots	

==== Debate ====
2024 Utah's 3rd congressional district republican primary debate
No.	Date	Host	Moderator	Link	Republican	Republican	Republican	Republican	Republican
Key: P Participant A Absent N Not invited I Invited W Withdrawn									
Key: P Participant A Absent N Not invited I Invited W Withdrawn					Rod Bird	John Dougall	Mike Kennedy	Case Lawrence	Stewart Peay
1	Jun. 12, 2024	Utah Debate Commission	Thomas Wright	YouTube	P	P	P	P	P

==== Results ====
Results by county: Kennedy: 30–40%; 40–50%; Bird: 30–40%; 50–60%; 60–70%; Tie

Republican primary results
Party	Candidate	Votes	%
Republican	Mike Kennedy	43,618	38.8
Republican	Case Lawrence	24,884	22.1
Republican	Rod Bird	17,207	15.3
Republican	Stewart Peay	15,954	14.2
Republican	John Dougall	10,800	9.6
Total votes		112,463	100.0

=== Democratic primary ===
==== Nominee ====
- Glenn Wright, former Summit County councilor and nominee for this district in 2022

==== Fundraising ====
Campaign finance reports as of April 7, 2024
Candidate	Raised	Spent	Cash on hand
Glenn Wright (D)	$24,841	$12,951	$12,079
Source: Federal Election Commission

=== General election ===
==== Predictions ====
Source	Ranking	As of
The Cook Political Report	Solid R	December 30, 2023
Inside Elections	Solid R	January 3, 2024
Sabato's Crystal Ball	Safe R	November 16, 2023
Elections Daily	Safe R	October 26, 2023
CNalysis	Solid R	December 28, 2023

==== Polling ====
Poll source	Date(s) administered	Sample size	Margin of error	Mike Kennedy (R)	Glenn Wright (D)	Undecided
Lighthouse Research	August 29 – September 19, 2024	504 (RV)	± 4.4%	61%	33%	6%

==== Results ====
2024 Utah's 3rd congressional district election
Party	Candidate	Votes	%
Republican	Mike Kennedy	242,496	66.4
Democratic	Glenn Wright	122,780	33.6
Total votes		365,276	100.0
Republican hold			

== District 4 ==
2024 Utah's 4th congressional district election
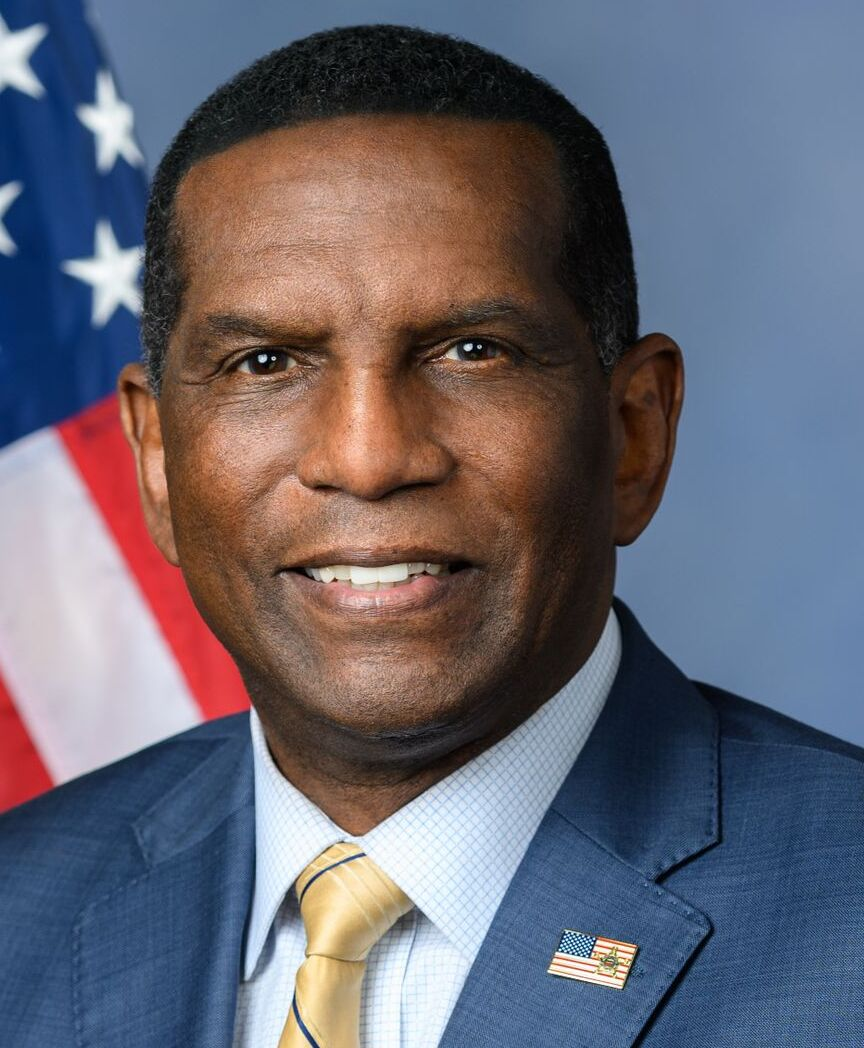

Nominee	Burgess Owens	Katrina Fallick-Wang
Party	Republican	Democratic
Popular vote	230,627	109,838
Percentage	63.4%	30.2%
- Owens: 40–50% 50–60% 60–70% 70–80% >90% Fallick-Wang: 40–50% 50–60% 60–70% 70–80% 80–90% No votes
U.S. Representative before election
Burgess Owens
Republican
Elected U.S. Representative
Burgess Owens
Republican

The 4th district is based in southwest Salt Lake County, taking in parts of West Valley City and Salt Lake City, as well as South Salt Lake, Taylorsville, Murray, West Jordan, Midvale, South Jordan, Riverton, Herriman, and Bluffdale. The district also stretches south into eastern Utah County, western Juab County, and northern Sanpete County. The incumbent is Republican Burgess Owens, who was re-elected with 61.06% of the vote in 2022.

=== Republican primary ===
==== Nominee ====
- Burgess Owens, incumbent U.S. Representative

==== Endorsements ====
Burgess Owens

Political parties

- Utah Republican Party

Organizations

- AIPAC
- Log Cabin Republicans PAC

Labor unions

- Utah Fraternal Order of Police

==== Fundraising ====
Campaign finance reports as of April 7, 2024
Candidate	Raised	Spent	Cash on hand
Burgess Owens (R)	$750,501	$767,522	$187,928
Source: Federal Election Commission

=== Democratic primary ===
==== Nominee ====
- Katrina Fallick-Wang, web developer

==== Eliminated at convention ====
- Jonathan Lopez

=== United Utah convention ===
==== Nominee ====
- Vaughn Cook, naturopath and Democratic candidate for governor in 2016

=== Independents ===
==== Declared ====
- M. Evan Bullard, psychologist

=== General election ===
==== Predictions ====
Source	Ranking	As of
The Cook Political Report	Solid R	December 30, 2023
Inside Elections	Solid R	January 3, 2024
Sabato's Crystal Ball	Safe R	November 16, 2023
Elections Daily	Safe R	October 26, 2023
CNalysis	Solid R	December 28, 2023

==== Polling ====
Poll source	Date(s) administered	Sample size	Margin of error	Burgess Owens (R)	Katrina Fallick-Wang (D)	Undecided
Lighthouse Research	August 29 – September 19, 2024	503 (RV)	± 4.4%	58%	28%	14%

==== Results ====
2024 Utah's 4th congressional district election
Party	Candidate	Votes	%
Republican	Burgess Owens (incumbent)	230,627	63.4
Democratic	Katrina Fallick-Wang	109,838	30.2
United Utah	Vaughn Cook	17,347	4.8
Independent	M. Evan Bullard	5,856	1.6
Total votes		363,668	100.0
Republican hold			

== Notes ==
Partisan clients
