= Utah State Auditor =

American state executive officer

State Auditor of Utah
- Seal of the Utah State Auditor

- Incumbent; Tina Cannon since January 6, 2025
- Style: Mister or Madam Auditor (informal); The Honorable (formal)
- Seat: Utah State Capitol; Salt Lake City, Utah
- Appointer: General election
- Term length: Four years, unlimited
- Constituting instrument: Article VII, Section 15, Utah Constitution
- Formation: January 4, 1896 (130 years ago)
- Salary: $104,405
- Website: Official website

The state auditor of Utah is a constitutional officer in the executive branch of the U.S. state of Utah. Twenty-five individuals have held the office of state auditor since statehood. The incumbent is Tina Cannon, a Republican.

== Powers and duties ==
The state auditor is charged by Utah's constitution "to perform financial post audits of public accounts" and is designated by statute as "auditor of public accounts". The state auditor exercises this power, duty, and authority by conducting financial, compliance, and performance audits of state agencies, performing desk reviews of local governments' audit reports to ensure compliance with the law and Government Auditing Standards, and investigating allegations of waste, fraud, or abuse of public funds and resources at both the state and local level. The state auditor also enforces Utah's data privacy law, prescribes uniform accounting, budgeting, and financial reporting systems for local governments, provides local government officials with consulting services, and trains certified public accountants engaged in local government audit work.

== List of state auditors ==
Utah State Auditors
| No. | State Auditor | Term in office | Party | Election |
|---|---|---|---|---|
| 1 | Morgan Richards Jr | 1896 - 1900 | Republican | 1895 |
| 2 | C S Tingey | 1900 - 1905 | Republican | 1900 |
| 3 | J A Edwards | 1905 - 1909 | Republican | 1904 |
| 4 | Jesse D Jewkes | 1909 - 1913 | Republican | 1908 |
| 5 | Lincoln G Kelly | 1913 - 1917 | Republican | 1912 |
| 6 | Joseph Ririe | 1917 - 1921 | Democrat | 1916 |
| 7 | Mark Tuttle | 1921 - 1925 | Republican | 1920 |
| 8 | John E Holden | 1925 - 1929 | Republican | 1924 |
| 9 | Ivor Ajax | 1929 - 1933 | Republican | 1928 |
| 10 | Julius C Anderson | 1933 - 1937 | Democrat | 1932 |
| 11 | John W Guy | 1937 - 1941 | Democrat | 1936 |
| 12 | Reese M Reese | 1941 - 1945 | Democrat | 1940 |
| 13 | Ferrell H Adams | 1945 - 1949 | Democrat | 1944 |
| 14 | Reese M Reese | 1949 - 1953 | Democrat | 1948 |
| 15 | Sherman J Preece | 1953 - 1957 | Republican | 1952 |
| 16 | Sid Lambourne | 1957 - 1961 | Republican | 1956 |
| 17 | Sherman J Preece | 1961 - 1965 | Republican | 1960 |
| 18 | Sharp M Larsen | 1965 - 1969 | Democrat | 1964 |
| 19 | Sherman J Preece | 1969 - 1973 | Republican | 1968 |
| 20 | David Smith Monson | 1973 - 1977 | Republican | 1972 |
| 21 | Richard Jensen | 1977 - 1981 | Republican | 1976 |
| 22 | W Val Oveson | 1981 - 1985 | Republican | 1980 |
| 23 | Tom L Allen | 1985 - 1997 | Republican | 1984 |
| 23 | Tom L Allen | 1985 - 1997 | Republican | 1988 |
| 23 | Tom L Allen | 1985 - 1997 | Republican | 1992 |
| 24 | Auston G Johnson | 1997 - 2013 | Republican | 1996 |
| 24 | Auston G Johnson | 1997 - 2013 | Republican | 2000 |
| 24 | Auston G Johnson | 1997 - 2013 | Republican | 2004 |
| 24 | Auston G Johnson | 1997 - 2013 | Republican | 2008 |
| 25 | John Dougall | 2013 - 2025 | Republican | 2012 |
| 25 | John Dougall | 2013 - 2025 | Republican | 2016 |
| 25 | John Dougall | 2013 - 2025 | Republican | 2020 |
| 26 | Tina Cannon | 2025 - Present | Republican | 2024 |
