= Blake Moore =

American politician (born 1980)

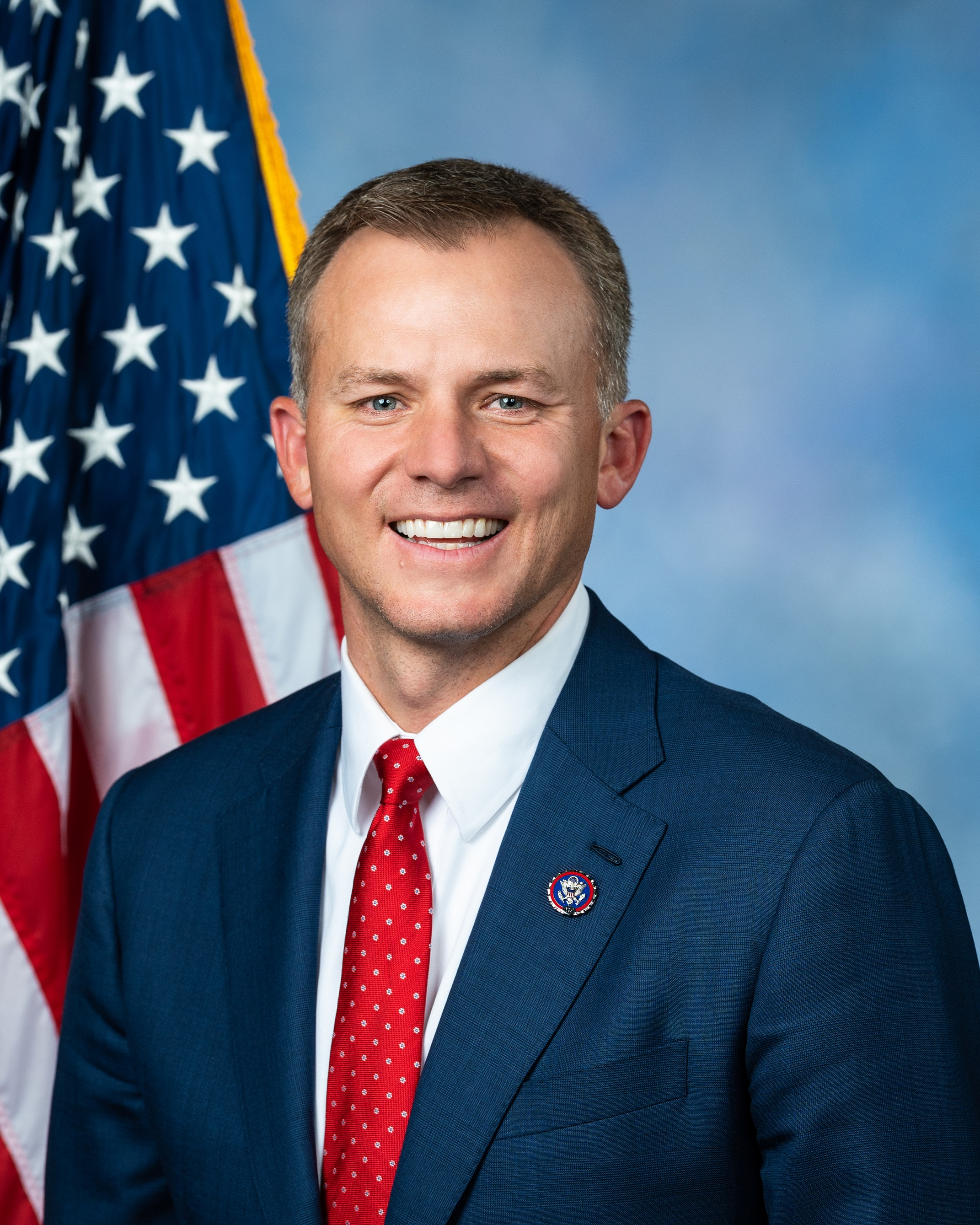
- Official portrait, 2022

Vice Chair of the House Republican Conference
- Incumbent
- Assumed office November 8, 2023
- Leader: Mike Johnson
- Preceded by: Mike Johnson

Member of the U.S. House of Representatives from Utah's 1st district
- Incumbent
- Assumed office January 3, 2021
- Preceded by: Rob Bishop

Personal details
- Born: Blake David Moore; June 22, 1980 (age 46) Ogden, Utah, U.S.
- Party: Republican
- Spouse: Jane Boyer (m. 2010)
- Children: 4
- Education: Utah State University (attended); University of Utah (BA); Northwestern University (MPA)
- Website: House website Campaign website

Blake David Moore (born June 22, 1980) is an American politician and former diplomat from the state of Utah. He is the U.S. representative for Utah's 1st congressional district, serving since January 2021. Since November 8, 2023, he has been the vice chair of the House Republican Conference.

Born and raised in Ogden, Utah, he served as a missionary assignment in South Korea before completing degrees at the University of Utah and Northwestern University. He went on to work as a U.S. Foreign Service officer and management consultant, and later co-chaired the Better Boundaries campaign that led to Utah’s 2018 independent redistricting commission. First elected to Congress in 2020, he was re-elected in 2022 and 2024.

A moderate Republican, Moore is a member of the Republican Governance Group. He is known for a willingness to break with his party, voting to keep Liz Cheney in Republican leadership, supporting the Respect for Marriage Act, and endorsing a pathway to citizenship for certain undocumented immigrants. In 2026, he drew criticism from Utah Republicans for his support of an independent redistricting commission, which resulted in the creation of a safely Democratic district in Salt Lake City. Most of Moore's former territory became the 2nd district. He won renomination there with 56.7% of the vote, and was re-elected with 49.8% of the vote.

== Early life and education ==
Moore was born and raised in Ogden, Utah. He attended Ogden High School, graduating in 1998. During high school, he was a quarterback for the football team. In 1997, he won the Wendy's High School Heisman. He is an Eagle Scout.

After graduating from high school, Moore enrolled at Utah State University on a football scholarship. His roommate freshman year was American-born Azerbaijani professional basketball player Spencer Nelson. During his freshman year, Moore's football scholarship was rescinded by a newly-installed football coach after he left to serve as a missionary for The Church of Jesus Christ of Latter-day Saints in Seoul, South Korea.

After returning from his mission, Moore transferred to the University of Utah, where he earned a Bachelor of Arts degree in behavioral science and business. He earned a master's in public policy and administration from Northwestern University.

== Career ==
Moore briefly served as a United States Foreign Service officer in the United States Department of State, and worked as a business consultant for the Cicero Group, a management consulting firm based in Salt Lake City.

In 2017, Moore was one of four co-chairs for the anti-gerrymandering organization Better Boundaries, which led the successful ballot initiative campaign for the 2018 Utah Proposition 4, establishing an independent redistricting commission.

== U.S. House of Representatives ==
=== Elections ===
==== 2020 ====
2020 GOP primary results map by county

In February 2020, Moore declared his candidacy for Utah's 1st congressional district in the 2020 elections. In a field of 12 primary candidates, Moore placed second in the Republican nominating convention with 43% of the vote, securing a spot in the primary alongside Weber County Commissioner Kerry Gibson. Two other candidates, Davis County commissioner Bob Stevenson and Kaysville mayor Katie Witt, also secured their spot in the primary by gathering signatures.

Moore was criticized for not living within the congressional district, residing on the east bench of Salt Lake City, which is 15 miles outside the district. Running against three other candidates, Moore won the Republican primary in June with 31% of the vote.

In the general election, Moore defeated Democratic nominee Darren Parry with 69.5% of the vote.

==== 2022 ====
2022 GOP primary results map by county

Running for re-election in 2022, Moore was challenged by Andrew Badger and Tina Cannon in the Republican primary. Moore placed second in the state republican convention with 40.72% of the vote, and later won the primary with 57.6%.

On May 15, State Senate President Stuart Adams endorsed Moore in an editorial in the Deseret News.

==== 2024 ====
Running for re-election in 2024, Moore was challenged by Paul Miller and Derek Draper in the Republican nominating convention. He placed second in the convention with 45.14% of the vote, advancing to the primary with Paul Miller. Moore defeated Miller in the primary with 71% of the vote.

Moore won the general election against Democrat Bill Campbell with 63% of the vote.

==== 2026 ====
Due to a court-ordered redistricting in Utah, Moore's old district essentially became the 2nd district, and he sought reelection there. As with each of his previous congressional campaigns, Moore did not win the state delegate convention vote. His campaign collected enough signatures to qualify for the primary ballot anyway, and faced Utah state representative Karianne Lisonbee in the primary. Lisonbee has criticized him for his past support of Proposition 4, which Utah Republican leaders blamed for instigating litigation leading to the creation of a safely Democratic seat in and around Salt Lake City. Moore won the primary with 56.7% of the vote.

=== Tenure ===
Moore has been described as a moderate Republican throughout his tenure.

Moore voted against the second impeachment of Donald Trump.

On May 19, 2021, Moore voted for bipartisan legislation to establish the January 6 commission meant to investigate the attack on the U.S. Capitol. The bill to establish this commission was blocked in the Senate. House Republican Leader Kevin McCarthy had earlier advocated for congressional action to form such a commission on January 13, stating that "[he thought] a fact-finding commission ... would be prudent." Moore voted against the Democratic-led United States House Select Committee on the January 6 Attack.

Moore was among the few House Republicans who voted to keep Liz Cheney as conference chair both times a vote was held. In an interview with the Deseret News editorial board, Moore stated he felt no pressure to vote one way or another from Republican leadership, and said it was important for the Republican leadership team to hold "broad appeal."

In July 2021, Business Insider revealed that Moore had failed to disclose on time more than 70 stock and stock-option trades made between mid-January and mid-May 2021, in violation of the STOCK Act. The total value of the stocks in question is unknown, but was between $70,000 and $1.1 million. Moore acknowledged paying a "late filing fee" to the House Committee on Ethics in July 2021; the value of that fee generally starts at $200. In September 2021, Business Insider reported that Moore failed to disclose an additional three stock-option trades made in August 2021 by a federally mandated deadline.

In November 2021, Moore voted against the Infrastructure Investment and Jobs Act.

In the wake of the Taliban's conquering of Afghanistan, Moore introduced the Afghanistan Accountability Act to investigate what the Biden administration knew before deciding to leave Afghanistan.

As of November 2021, Moore voted with Joe Biden's preferred positions 16% of the time, according to FiveThirtyEight's tracker.

In 2021, Moore co-sponsored the Fairness for All Act, the Republican alternative to the Equality Act. The bill would prohibit discrimination on the basis of sex, sexual orientation, and gender identity, and protect the free exercise of religion.

On November 8, 2023, after the ascension of Mike Johnson to the role of Speaker of the House, Moore defeated six other candidates to become the new GOP conference vice chair.

In February 2024, Moore voted against the impeachment of Alejandro Mayorkas as part of a procedural move in order to allow the vote to be brought again under a motion to reconsider. He would vote in favor of it the second time around.

=== Committee assignments ===
- House Ways and Means Committee
- House Budget Committee

=== Caucus memberships ===
- Republican Main Street Partnership
- Republican Study Committee
- Republican Governance Group
- Congressional YIMBY Caucus
- Congressional Western Caucus

== Personal life ==
Moore and his wife, Jane Boyer, have four sons. Moore has said that despite being elected to Congress, the title he most prizes is "Little League coach".

U.S. House of Representatives
Preceded by Rob Bishop	Member of the U.S. House of Representatives from Utah's 1st congressional district 2021–present	Incumbent
Preceded by Celeste Maloy	Member of the U.S. House of Representatives from Utah's 2nd congressional district Taking office 2027	Elect
Party political offices
Preceded by Mike Johnson	Vice Chair of the House Republican Conference; 2023–present	Incumbent
U.S. order of precedence (ceremonial)
Preceded by Barry Moore	United States representatives by seniority 267th	Succeeded by Frank J. Mrvan
