= 2018 United States Senate election in Utah =

- November 6, 2018
- Turnout: 74.15% ▲
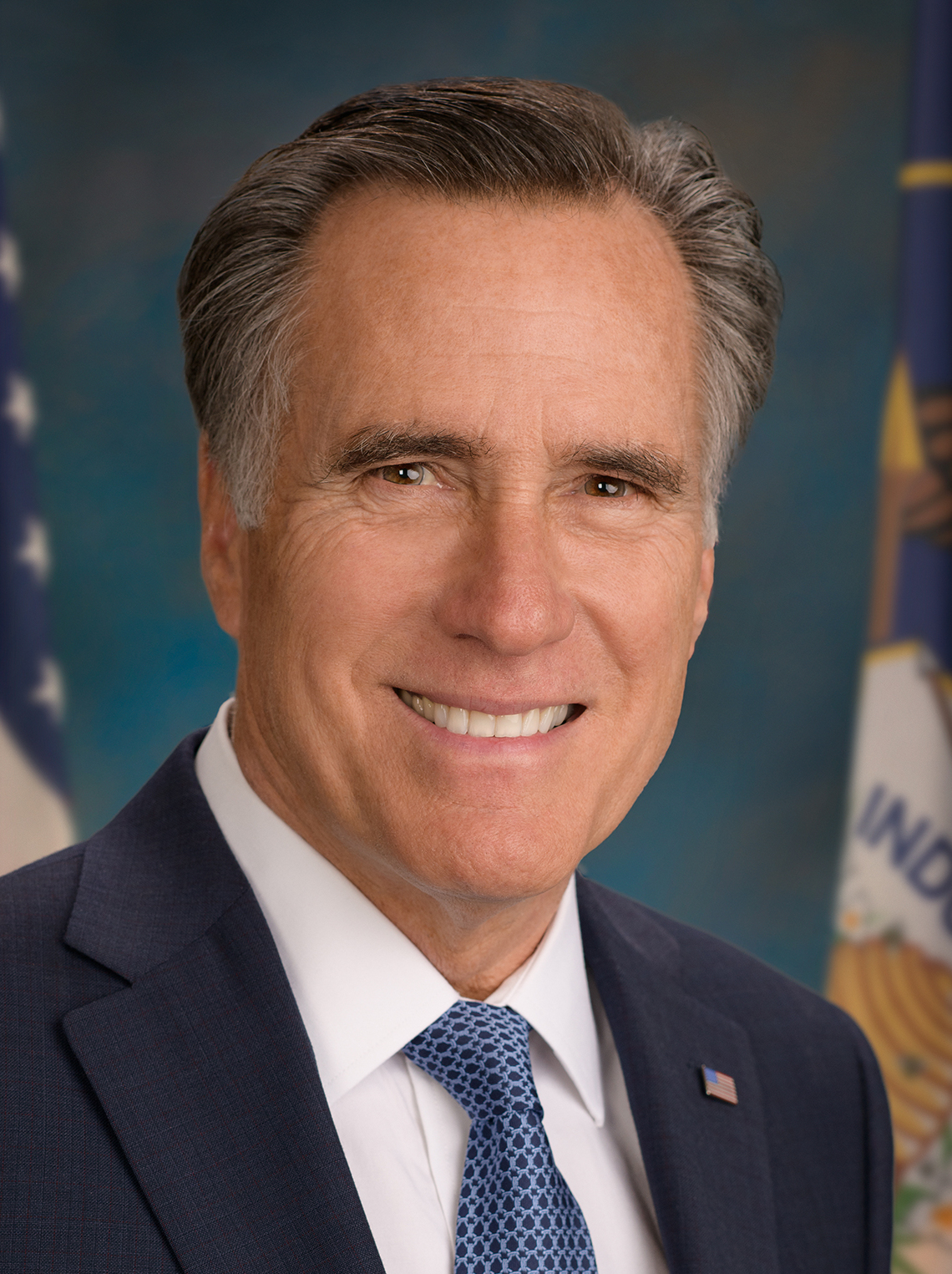

Nominee	Mitt Romney	Jenny Wilson
Party	Republican	Democratic
Popular vote	665,215	328,541
Percentage	62.59%	30.91%
- Romney: 40–50% 50–60% 60–70% 70–80% 80–90% >90% Wilson: 40–50% 50–60% 60–70% 70–80% 80–90% >90% No data
U.S. senator before election
Orrin Hatch
Republican
Elected U.S. Senator
Mitt Romney
Republican

The 2018 United States Senate election in Utah took place on November 6, 2018, to elect a member of the United States Senate to represent the State of Utah, concurrently with other elections to the United States Senate, elections to the United States House of Representatives, and various state and local elections. The primaries took place on June 26.

Incumbent Republican senator Orrin Hatch announced in January 2018 that he would retire and not seek reelection to an eighth term, making this the first open seat U.S. Senate election in Utah since 1992 and the first in this seat since 1905. This was the first Senate election since 1964 that Grand County voted Democratic.

The general election was won by Mitt Romney, who had been the Republican nominee for president in 2012 and previously was the 70th governor of Massachusetts from 2003 to 2007. Romney became only the third person in American history to be elected governor and U.S. senator in different states, and the first former major party presidential nominee to run for a new office since Walter Mondale in 2002.

== Background ==
=== Process ===
Utah's 2018 U.S. Senate candidates had dual routes toward placement on the primary election ballot: (1) eligibility via win or second-place showings at a convention of delegates selected from party local caucuses; and/or (2) eligibility via obtaining sufficient petition signatures.

Taking the traditional route, the top two candidates for the U.S. Senate at any of the party state conventions (to be held in the latter part of April, 2018) would be placed on the June 26 primary election ballot. Also, any candidate who collected 28,000 ballot-access petition signatures would be placed on the primary ballot.

If no competitor achieved the above-mentioned alternate access to the primary ballot through collected signatures and a convention winner achieved sixty-percent of delegate votes, this candidate straightaway received his or her party's nomination solely via the older-style caucuses-convention system. Otherwise, a candidate would be nominated through receiving a plurality of votes in the primary election and thereby advance to the November general election.

Incumbent Orrin Hatch did not seek reelection.

=== Hatch to retire ===
Incumbent Republican U.S. Senator Orrin Hatch was reelected to a seventh term in 2012. During his 2012 reelection campaign, he had pledged that if he were elected, it would be his last term. Hatch won his first election in 1976 in part by criticizing the incumbent's 18-year tenure. Hatch initially announced a re-election campaign on March 9, 2017, though he also said at that time that he might withdraw from the race if Mitt Romney decided to run. An August 19–21, 2016 poll conducted by Public Policy Polling found only 19% of voters wanted Hatch to run in 2018, while 71% wanted him to retire. On October 27, 2017, Hatch reportedly told friends privately that he was going to retire in 2019 and on January 2, 2018, made a public announcement of his plans to retire at the end of his current term in January 2019.

== Republican primary ==
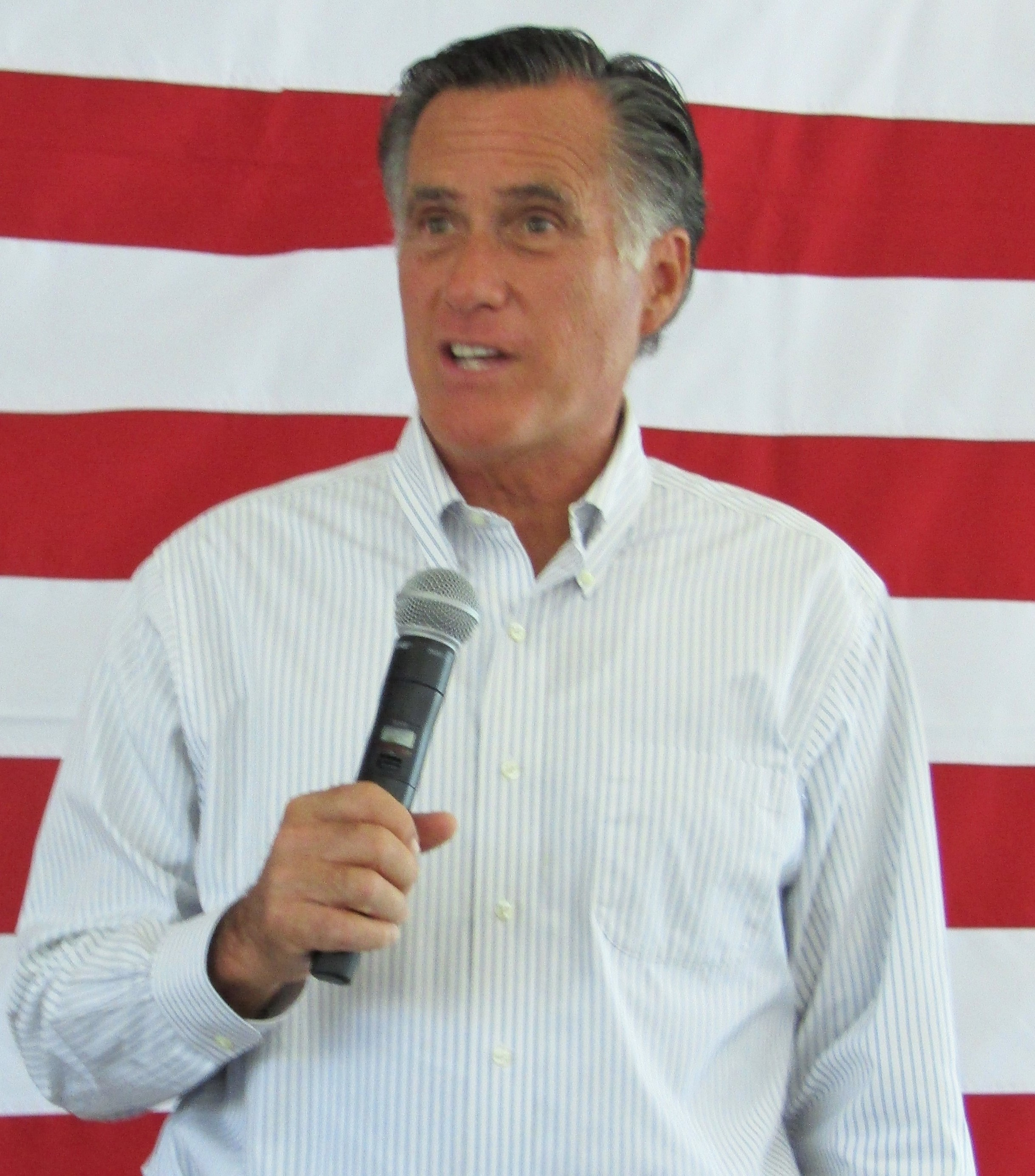
Romney campaigning

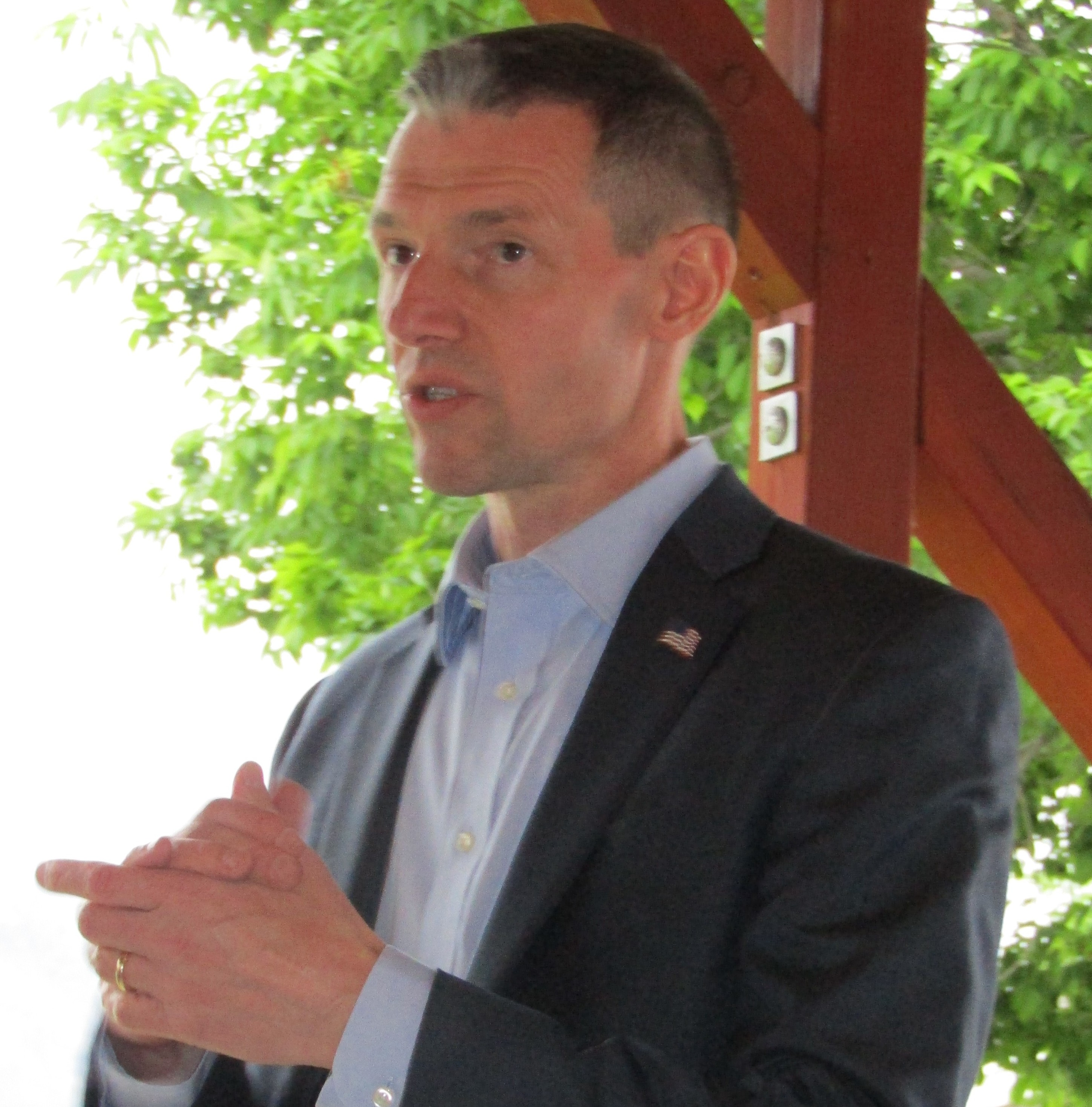
Kennedy campaigning

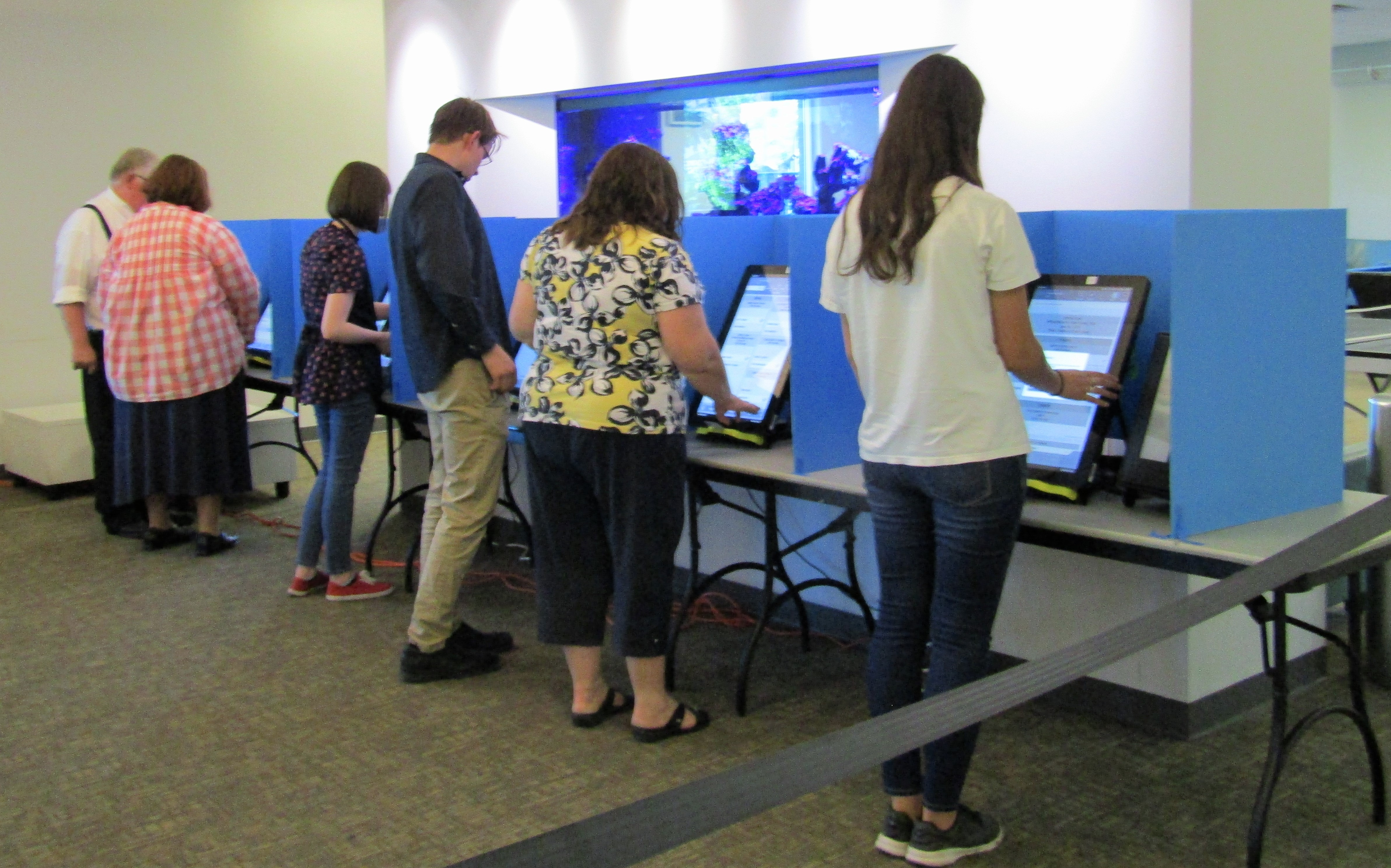
People voting in the Republican primary

=== Convention ===
==== Nominee ====
- Mitt Romney, former governor of Massachusetts, Republican nominee for president of the United States in 2012, and Republican nominee for U.S. Senate in Massachusetts in 1994

==== Eliminated in the primary election ====
- Mike Kennedy, state representative

==== Eliminated at convention ====
- Loy Brunson
- Alicia Colvin
- Stoney Fonua, tax accountant
- Chris Forbush, attorney and candidate for the Nevada State Assembly in 2016
- Jeremy Friedbaum
- Timothy Adrian Jimenez, engineer
- Joshua Lee
- Larry Michael Meyers, attorney
- Gayle Painter
- Samuel Parker

==== Declined ====
- Rob Bishop, U.S. representative from Utah's 1st congressional district (ran for re-election)
- Jason Chaffetz, former U.S. representative
- John Curtis, U.S. representative from Utah's 3rd congressional district (ran for re-election)
- Orrin Hatch, incumbent U.S. senator and president pro tempore of the United States Senate
- Mia Love, U.S. representative (endorsed Romney)
- Boyd Matheson, former Chief of Staff for Senator Mike Lee
- Evan McMullin, former congressional staffer, former CIA agent and independent candidate for president of the United States in 2016 (endorsed Romney)

==== Endorsements ====
Larry Meyers (eliminated at convention)

Individuals

- Ammon Bundy, car fleet manager, led the 2016 occupation of the Malheur National Wildlife Refuge
- Jonathan E. Johnson, chairman of the board for Overstock.com and former Republican candidate for Utah governor

==== Results ====
State Republican Convention results, 2018
Candidate	First ballot	Pct.	Second ballot	Pct.
Mike Kennedy	1,354	40.69%	1,642	50.88%
Mitt Romney	1,539	46.24%	1,585	49.12%
Larry Meyers	163	4.90%	Eliminated	
Samuel Parker	122	3.67%	Eliminated	
Timothy Jiminez	100	3.01%	Eliminated	
Alicia Colvin	29	0.87%	Eliminated	
Stoney Fonua	7	0.21%	Eliminated	
Loy Brunson	4	0.12%	Eliminated	
Joshua Lee	2	0.06%	Eliminated	
Chris Forbush	0	0%	Eliminated	
Gayle Painter	0	0%	Eliminated	
Total	3,328	100.00%	3,227	100.00%

=== Primary ===
==== Debates ====
Host network	Date	Link(s)	Participants	
Host network	Date	Link(s)	Mitt Romney	Mike Kennedy
KBYU-TV	May 29, 2018		Invited	Invited

==== Polling ====
Poll source	Date(s) administered	Sample size	Margin of error	Mike Kennedy	Mitt Romney	Undecided
Dan Jones & Associates	June 11–18, 2018	356	± 5.2%	23%	65%	12%
Dan Jones & Associates	May 15–25, 2018	295	± 5.7%	24%	67%	9%

Hypothetical polling

with Orrin Hatch

Poll source	Date(s) administered	Sample size	Margin of error	Orrin Hatch	Jon Huntsman Jr.	Undecided
Dan Jones & Associates	January 9–16, 2017	605	± 4.0%	21%	62%	16%

==== Endorsements ====
Mitt Romney

U.S. executive branch officials

- George W. Bush, 43rd president of the United States
- Donald Trump, 45th president of the United States

U.S. senators

- Jeff Flake, U.S. senator from Arizona
- Lindsey Graham, U.S. senator from South Carolina and Republican candidate for president of the United States in 2016
- Chuck Grassley, U.S. senator from Iowa
- Orrin Hatch, U.S. Senator from Utah and President Pro Tempore of the Senate
- John McCain, U.S. senator from Arizona and Republican nominee for president of the United States in 2008 (died August 25, 2018)
- Mitch McConnell, U.S. senator from Kentucky and Senate Majority Leader
- Jim Risch, U.S. senator from Idaho
- Richard Shelby, U.S. senator from Alabama

U.S. representatives

- Jason Chaffetz, former U.S. representative from Utah's 3rd district
- John Curtis, U.S. representative from Utah's 3rd district
- Mia Love, U.S. representative from Utah's 4th district
- Paul Ryan, 55th Speaker of the United States House of Representatives, U.S. representative from Wisconsin's 1st District, and Romney's running mate in the 2012 presidential election

U.S. governors

- Jeb Bush, former governor of Florida and Republican candidate for president of the United States in 2016
- Luis Fortuño, former governor of Puerto Rico (New Progressive)
- Gary Herbert, governor of Utah

Statewide officeholders

- Spencer Cox, lieutenant governor of Utah

Individuals

- Jon Huntsman Sr., businessman and philanthropist
- Evan McMullin, former congressional staffer, former CIA agent and independent candidate for president of the United States in 2016 (Independent)
- Dana Milbank, political commentator
- Henry Paulson, 74th United States Secretary of the Treasury
- Kevin D. Williamson, political commentator

Newspapers and magazines

- The Lowell Sun
- National Review
- Salt Lake Tribune
Mike Kennedy

State legislators

- Jake Anderegg, state senator
- Stewart Barlow, state representative
- Kay Christofferson, state representative
- Kim Coleman, state representative
- Francis Gibson, state representative
- Brian Greene, state representative
- Dan McCay, state representative
- Michael Noel, state representative
- Paul Ray, state representative
- Marc Roberts, state representative
- Mike Schultz, state representative
- Keven Stratton, state representative
- Christine Watkins, state representative

Individuals

- Michael Johns, policy analyst, speechwriter and Tea Party movement spokesman
- Robert C. Oaks, retired U.S. Air Force general

=== Debates ===
Date	Host	Moderator	Link(s)	Participants	
Key: P Participant A Absent N Non-invitee I Invitee W Withdrawn					
Key: P Participant A Absent N Non-invitee I Invitee W Withdrawn				Mike Kennedy	Mitt Romney
May 29, 2018	Utah Debate Commission	David Magleby		P	P

==== Results ====
Results by county: Romney: 70–80%; 60–70%; 50–60%; Kennedy: 50–60%

Republican primary results
Party	Candidate	Votes	%
Republican	Mitt Romney	240,021	71.27%
Republican	Mike Kennedy	96,771	28.73%
Total votes		336,792	100%

== Democratic primary ==
=== Candidates ===
==== Declared ====
- Jenny Wilson, Salt Lake County councilwoman and candidate for Mayor of Salt Lake City in 2007

==== Eliminated at convention ====
- Mitchell Kent Vice, businessman

==== Withdrew ====
- Danny Drew, director of adult education for the Duchesne County School District
- James Singer, Salt Lake Community College, Westminster College adjunct professor (ran for U.S. House)

==== Declined ====
- Ben McAdams, mayor of Salt Lake County (ran for U.S. House)

=== Endorsements ===
Jenny Wilson

U.S. representatives

- Grace Meng, U.S. representative (D-NY)

Statewide and local politicians

- Luz Escamilla, Utah state senator

Individuals

- Randy Bryce, ironworker and candidate for Wisconsin's 1st congressional district
Mitchell Vice

Organizations

- International Brotherhood of Electrical Workers Local Union 57

== Libertarian Party ==
=== Candidates ===
==== Declared ====
- Craig Bowden, veteran and businessman

== Constitution Party ==
=== Candidates ===
==== Declared ====
- Tim Aalders

== Independent American Party ==
=== Candidates ===
==== Declared ====
- Reed McCandless

== General election ==
=== Candidates ===
- Ryan Daniel Jackson (I, write-in)
- Abe Korb (I, write-in)
- Caleb Dan Reeve (I, write-in)

=== Debates ===
Date	Host	Moderator	Link(s)	Participants	
Key: P Participant A Absent N Non-invitee I Invitee W Withdrawn					
Key: P Participant A Absent N Non-invitee I Invitee W Withdrawn				Mitt Romney	Jenny Wilson
October 9, 2018	Utah Debate Commission	Bruce Lindsay		P	P

=== Predictions ===
Source	Ranking	As of
The Cook Political Report	Safe R	October 26, 2018
Inside Elections	Safe R	November 1, 2018
Sabato's Crystal Ball	Safe R	November 5, 2018
Fox News	Likely R	July 9, 2018
CNN	Safe R	July 12, 2018
RealClearPolitics	Safe R	November 5, 2018

^Highest rating given

=== Endorsements ===
Mitt Romney (R)

U.S. executive branch officials

- George W. Bush, 43rd president of the United States
- Donald Trump, 45th president of the United States

U.S. senators

- Jeff Flake, U.S. senator from Arizona
- Lindsey Graham, U.S. senator from South Carolina and Republican candidate for president of the United States in 2016
- Chuck Grassley, U.S. senator from Iowa
- Orrin Hatch, U.S. senator from Utah and president pro tempore of the Senate
- John McCain, U.S. senator from Arizona and Republican nominee for president of the United States in 2008 (died August 25, 2018)
- Mitch McConnell, U.S. senator from Kentucky and Senate Majority Leader
- Jim Risch, U.S. senator from Idaho
- Richard Shelby, U.S. senator from Alabama

U.S. representatives

- Jason Chaffetz, former U.S. representative from Utah's 3rd district
- John Curtis, U.S. representative from Utah's 3rd district
- Mia Love, U.S. representative from Utah's 4th district
- Paul Ryan, 55th Speaker of the United States House of Representatives, U.S. representative from Wisconsin's 1st District, and Romney's running mate in the 2012 presidential election

U.S. governors

- Jeb Bush, former governor of Florida and Republican candidate for president of the United States in 2016
- Luis Fortuño, former governor of Puerto Rico (New Progressive)
- Gary Herbert, governor of Utah

Statewide officeholders

- Spencer Cox, lieutenant governor of Utah

State legislators

- Mike Kennedy, state representative and primary opponent

Individuals

- Jon Huntsman Sr., businessman and philanthropist (now deceased)
- Evan McMullin, former congressional staffer, former CIA agent and independent candidate for president of the United States in 2016 (Independent)
- Dana Milbank, political commentator
- Henry Paulson, 74th United States Secretary of the Treasury
- Kevin D. Williamson, political commentator

Newspapers and magazines

- The Lowell Sun
- National Review
- Salt Lake Tribune
Jenny Wilson (D)

U.S. representatives

- Grace Meng, U.S. representative (D-NY)

Statewide and local politicians

- Luz Escamilla, Utah state senator

Labor unions

- United Automobile Workers
- Utah State AFL-CIO

Organizations

- Utah Stonewall Democrats

=== Polling ===
Graphical summary

View source data.

Poll source	Date(s) administered	Sample size	Margin of error	Mitt Romney (R)	Jenny Wilson (D)	Other	Undecided
University of Utah	October 3–9, 2018	607	± 4.0%	59%	23%	8%	10%
Dan Jones & Associates	August 22–31, 2018	809	± 3.4%	55%	29%	8%	7%
Lighthouse Research	August 11–27, 2018	2,400	–	59%	19%	9%	14%
University of Utah	June 11–18, 2018	654	± 3.9%	58%	20%	–	21%
Dan Jones & Associates	January 15–18, 2018	803	± 3.5%	64%	19%	–	12%
Dan Jones & Associates	November 16–21, 2017	600	± 4.0%	72%	21%	–	7%
Dan Jones & Associates	August 30 – September 5, 2017 (Note: The party affiliations of candidates were not described in the question wording as a result of an oversight by the pollster.)	608	± 4.0%	64%	26%	–	10%

==== Notes ====
Hypothetical polling

Poll source	Date(s) administered	Sample size	Margin of error	Mitt Romney (R)	Jenny Wilson (D)	Craig Bowden (L)	Dan McCay (R)	Mitchell Vice (D)	Larry Meyers (R)	Alicia Colvin (R)	Jay Hyatt (R)	L'Capi Titus (R)	Timothy Jimenez (R)	Other	Undecided
Dan Jones & Associates	February 9–16, 2018	609	± 4.0%	60%	14%	3%	2%	1%	1%	1%	1%	0%	0%	2%	14%

with Mike Kennedy

Poll source	Date(s) administered	Sample size	Margin of error	Mike Kennedy (R)	Jenny Wilson (D)	Undecided
Dan Jones & Associates	June 11–18, 2018	654	± 3.9%	43%	28%	29%

with Orrin Hatch

Poll source	Date(s) administered	Sample size	Margin of error	Orrin Hatch (R)	Jenny Wilson (D)	Undecided
Dan Jones & Associates	November 16–21, 2017	600	± 4.0%	50%	35%	15%
Dan Jones & Associates	August 30 – September 5, 2017	608	± 4.0%	34%	45%	21%

Poll source	Date(s) administered	Sample size	Margin of error	Orrin Hatch (R)	Evan McMullin (I)	Generic Democrat	Other	Undecided
JMC Analytics	March 18–March 20, 2017	625	± 3.9%	29%	33%	11%	10%	17%

with Chris Stewart

Poll source	Date(s) administered	Sample size	Margin of error	Chris Stewart (R)	Jenny Wilson (D)	Undecided
Dan Jones & Associates	August 30 – September 5, 2017	608	± 4.0%	34%	30%	36%

with Matt Holland

Poll source	Date(s) administered	Sample size	Margin of error	Matt Holland (R)	Jenny Wilson (D)	Undecided
Dan Jones & Associates	August 30 – September 5, 2017	608	± 4.0%	23%	30%	47%

=== Results ===

United States Senate general election in Utah, 2018
Party	Candidate	Votes	%	±%
Republican	Mitt Romney	665,215	62.59%	−2.72%
Democratic	Jenny Wilson	328,541	30.91%	+0.93%
Constitution	Tim Aalders	28,774	2.71%	−0.46%
Libertarian	Craig Bowden	27,607	2.60%	N/A
Independent American	Reed McCandless	12,708	1.20%	N/A
Write-in		52	<0.01%	N/A
Total votes		1,062,897	100%	N/A
Republican hold				

==== By county ====
County	Mitt Romney Republican		Jenny Wilson Democratic		Various candidates Other parties		Margin		Total
County	#	%	#	%	#	%	#	%	Total
Beaver	1,620	76.0%	298	14.0%	214	10.1%	1,322	62.0%	2,132
Box Elder	14,803	78.2%	2,603	13.8%	1,521	8.0%	12,200	64.4%	18,927
Cache	28,344	71.0%	8,854	22.2%	2,705	6.8%	19,490	48.8%	39,903
Carbon	4,387	63.7%	1,879	27.3%	622	9.0%	2,508	36.4%	6,888
Daggett	335	76.3%	80	18.2%	24	5.5%	255	58.1%	439
Davis	86,840	69.9%	29,249	23.5%	8,190	6.6%	57,591	46.4%	124,279
Duchesne	4,522	78.4%	569	9.9%	680	11.8%	3,953	68.5%	5,771
Emery	3,033	78.3%	509	13.1%	330	8.6%	2,524	65.2%	3,872
Garfield	1,626	76.0%	388	18.1%	126	5.9%	1,238	57.9%	2,140
Grand	1,935	44.6%	2,138	49.3%	265	6.1%	-203	-4.7%	4,338
Iron	11,286	71.4%	2,846	18.0%	1,669	10.6%	8,440	63.4%	15,801
Juab	3,320	79.9%	492	11.8%	342	8.3%	2,828	68.1%	4,154
Kane	2,135	68.5%	746	23.9%	236	7.6%	1,389	44.6%	3,117
Millard	3,672	79.6%	512	11.1%	429	9.4%	3,160	68.5%	4,613
Morgan	4,144	81.3%	600	11.8%	351	6.9%	3,544	69.5%	5,095
Piute	524	75.7%	77	11.1%	91	13.2%	447	64.6%	692
Rich	911	83.0%	124	11.3%	62	5.7%	787	71.7%	1,097
Salt Lake	207,719	50.0%	186,856	45.0%	20,898	5.0%	20,863	5.0%	415,473
San Juan	2,934	54.4%	2,096	38.9%	363	6.8%	838	15.5%	5,393
Sanpete	7,367	79.6%	1,139	12.3%	746	8.0%	6,228	67.3%	9,252
Sevier	5,810	79.7%	771	10.6%	706	9.7%	5,039	69.1%	7,287
Summit	9,170	45.4%	10,229	50.6%	811	4.0%	-1,059	-5.2%	20,210
Tooele	14,407	65.6%	5,491	25.0%	2,057	9.3%	8,916	40.6%	21,955
Uintah	7,946	77.5%	1,135	11.1%	1,175	11.4%	6,811	66.4%	10,256
Utah	135,240	77.0%	28,856	16.4%	11,472	6.5%	106,384	60.6%	175,568
Wasatch	8,126	66.7%	3,467	28.4%	595	4.8%	4,659	38.3%	12,188
Washington	42,602	70.4%	11,757	19.4%	6,150	10.1%	30,845	51.0%	60,509
Wayne	999	73.6%	267	19.7%	91	6.6%	732	53.9%	1,357
Weber	49,458	61.7%	24,513	30.6%	6,220	7.8%	24,945	31.1%	80,191
Totals	665,215	62.6%	328,541	30.9%	69,141	6.5%	336,674	31.7%	1,062,897

Counties that flipped from Republican to Democratic

- Grand (largest municipality: Moab)

State Senate district results

State House district results

==== By congressional district ====
Romney won all four congressional districts, including one that elected a Democrat.

District	Romney	Wilson	Representative
1st	67%	25%	Rob Bishop
2nd	57%	36%	Chris Stewart
3rd	68%	26%	John Curtis
4th	59%	36%	Mia Love
4th	59%	36%	Ben McAdams
