= John Dougall (politician) =

American politician (born 1966)

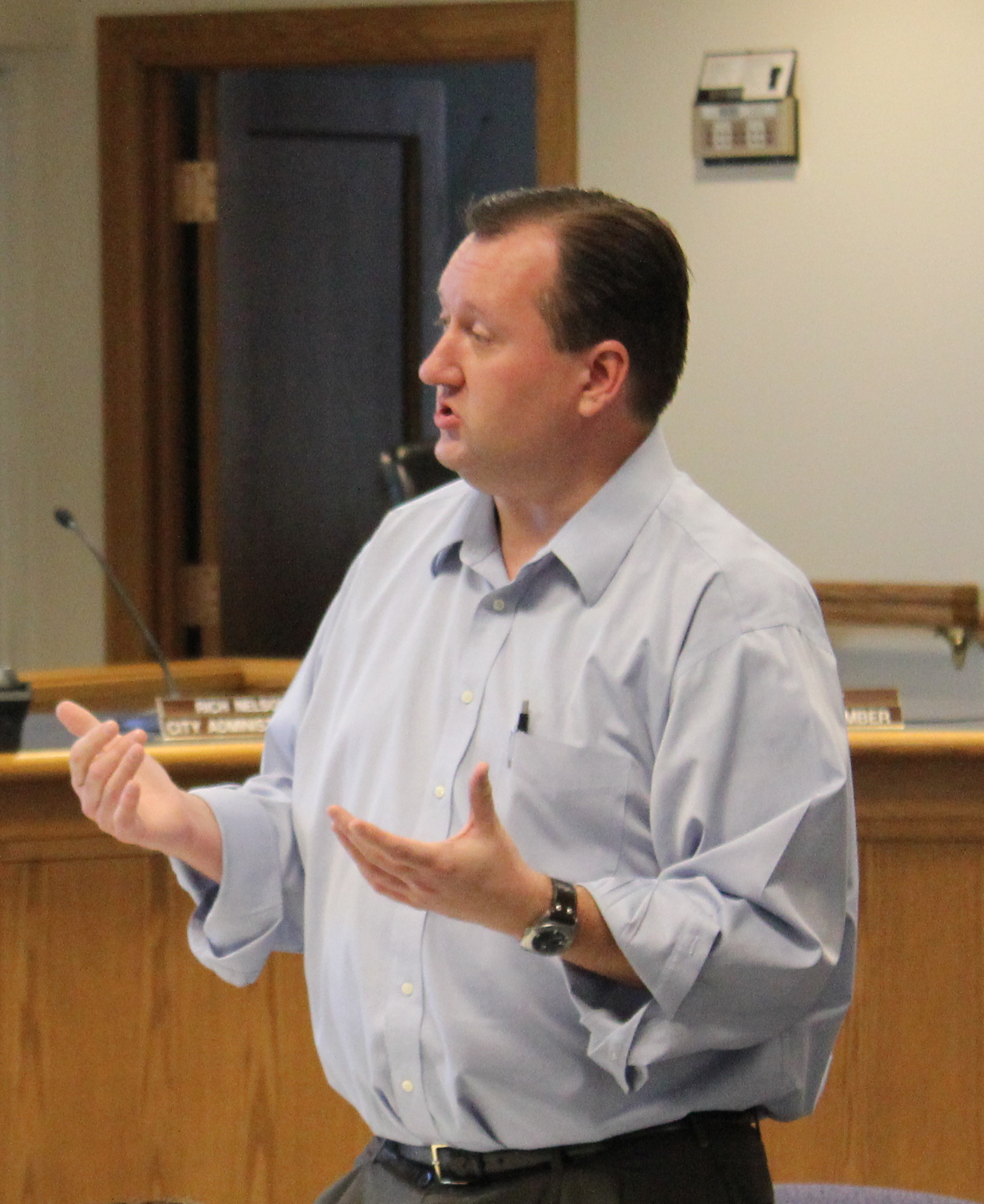

Auditor of Utah
- In office January 7, 2013 – January 6, 2025
- Governor: Gary Herbert; Spencer Cox
- Preceded by: Auston Johnson
- Succeeded by: Tina Cannon

Member of the Utah House of Representatives from the 27th district
- In office January 2003 – January 2013
- Preceded by: David Litvack
- Succeeded by: Mike Kennedy

Personal details
- Born: April 2, 1966 (age 60) Los Angeles, California, U.S.
- Party: Republican
- Spouse: Sandy
- Children: 3
- Education: Brigham Young University (BS, MS, MBA)

John Dougall (born April 2, 1966) is an American politician from the state of Utah who previously served as the Utah State Auditor from 2013 to 2025. A member of the Republican Party, he previously served as a Utah State Representative from 2003 to 2013. Dougall assumed office during the 55th legislative session, replacing David Litvack. Dougall has received bipartisan praise for his accomplishments as state auditor.

== Early life and education ==
Dougall was born in Hollywood and raised in Portland, Oregon. He graduated from Brigham Young University (BYU) in 1990 with a Bachelor of Science in electrical engineering, and he earned his Master of Science in electrical engineering from BYU the following year. He earned his Master of Business Administration from BYU in 2000.

Dougall has worked at various technology companies in Silicon Valley.

== Political career ==
Dougall was first elected to the Utah House of Representatives in 2002, winning against a crowded field of Republican Party primary opponents. During his 10-year tenure in the House, he sponsored various bills related to transportation, government transparency, and tax reform, including tax cuts in 2006 under governor Jon Huntsman. He also sponsored the controversial HB477, which would have amended the Government Records Access and Management Act to increase restrictions on public access to government documents. The bill was signed into law in March 2011 by governor Gary Herbert, but it was repealed two weeks later after public backlash and harsh criticism from The Salt Lake Tribune. Despite this, Dougall has generally been regarded as an advocate for transparency in the Utah state government.

Dougall was elected Utah State Auditor in 2012, defeating fellow Republican incumbent Auston Johnson. As state auditor, Dougall has led audits that have revealed mismanagement and unethical or illegal behavior at various levels of government in Utah, and some of his investigations have targeted members of his own party. For these actions, he has earned bipartisan praise as state auditor.

Dougall briefly considered challenging Mitt Romney in the Republican primary for U.S. Senate in 2018, but ultimately decided against it.

In 2020, it was announced that Dougall would be running for Lieutenant Governor of Utah as Aimee Winder Newton's running mate.

In 2024, Dougall as Utah State Auditor rolled out an online complaint form to report trans people in bathrooms per law HB 257, resulting in nearly 4,000 complaints that appeared to be fake. Following online backlash against the form and the barrage of fake complaints, Dougall released a statement indicating that the State Auditor's office only posted the online complaint form to be in compliance with the way the HB 257 was written requiring their office to have the form available to the public though the State Legislature did not consult with the State Auditor's office about the implementation and enforcement of the form. The statement included that Dougall's office will not be investigating any individuals and will only be investigating claims of government entities not meeting the compliance plan outlined in HB 257 because "many Utahns feel trampled by an invasive and overly aggressive Legislature that too often fails to seek input from those most affected."

Utah House of Representatives
Preceded by David Litvack	Member of the Utah House of Representatives from the 27th district 2003–2013	Succeeded by Mike Kennedy
Political offices
Preceded by Auston Johnson	Auditor of Utah; 2013–2025	Succeeded by Tina Cannon
