= Mike Kennedy =

American politician (born 1969)

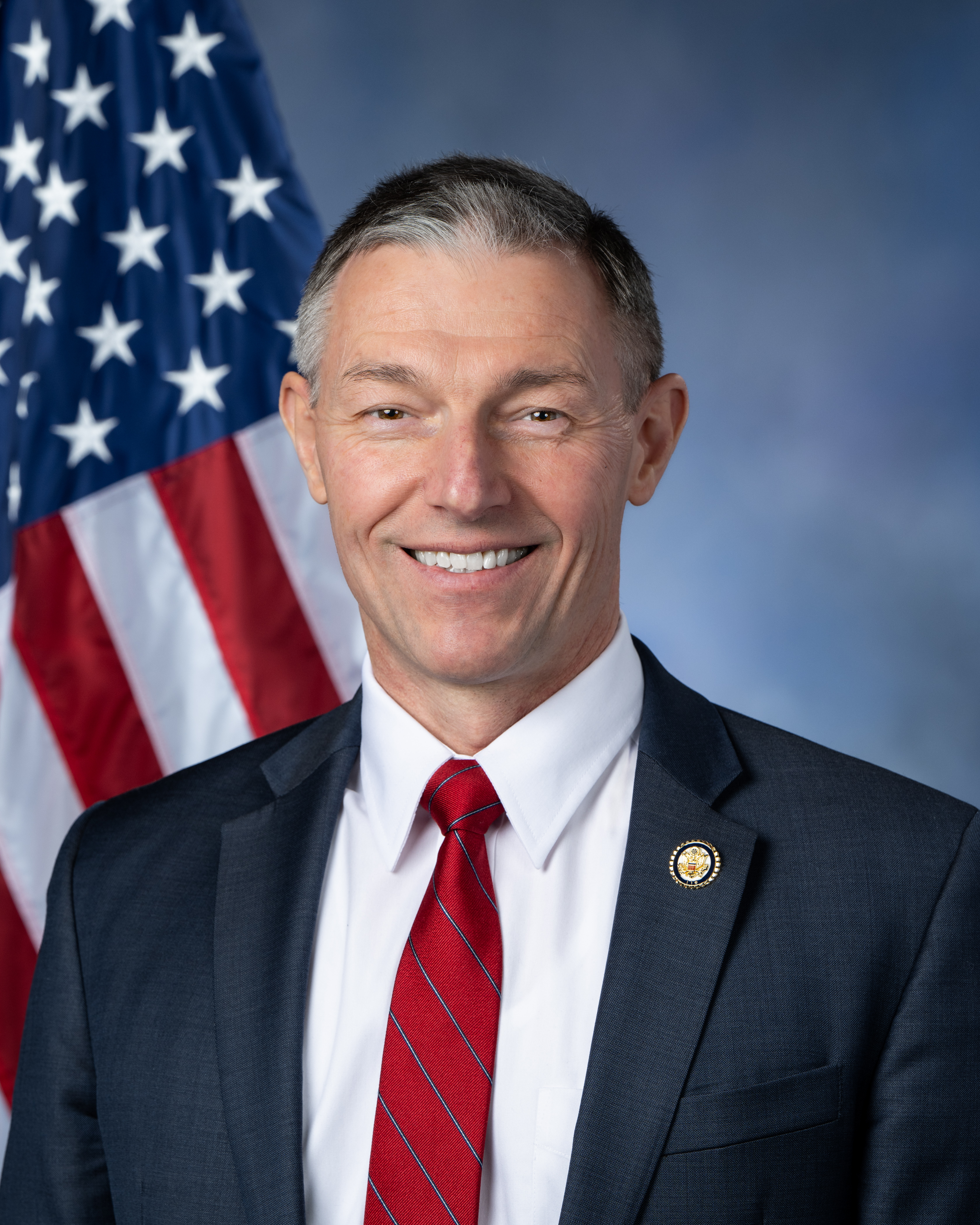
- Official portrait, 2025

Member of the U.S. House of Representatives from Utah's 3rd district
- Incumbent
- Assumed office January 3, 2025
- Preceded by: John Curtis

Member of the Utah Senate
- In office January 5, 2021 – January 1, 2025
- Preceded by: Dan Hemmert
- Succeeded by: Brady Brammer
- Constituency: 14th district (2021–2023); 21st district (2023–2025)

Member of the Utah House of Representatives from the 27th district
- In office January 1, 2013 – January 1, 2019
- Preceded by: John Dougall
- Succeeded by: Brady Brammer

Personal details
- Born: Michael Stephen Kennedy; February 2, 1969 (age 57) Lansing, Michigan, U.S.
- Party: Republican
- Spouse: Katrina Kennedy
- Children: 8
- Education: Brigham Young University (BS, JD); Michigan State University (MD)
- Website: House website Campaign website

Michael Stephen Kennedy (born February 2, 1969) is an American politician, attorney, and physician serving as the U.S. representative from Utah's 3rd congressional district since 2025. He previously served as a Republican member of the Utah Senate from 2021 to 2025 and as a member of the Utah House of Representatives from 2013 to 2019. Kennedy was a candidate in the 2018 U.S. Senate election in Utah; although he received the most votes at the Utah State Republican Convention, he was defeated by former Governor of Massachusetts and 2012 Republican presidential nominee Mitt Romney in the subsequent primary for the Republican nomination.

In June of 2024, Kennedy won the Republican nomination for Utah's 3rd congressional district with 39% of the vote in a crowded field of 5 candidates despite being outspent 5-1 and 2-1 by the top two competitors. He had previously won the Utah Republican Party nominating convention after six rounds of voting.

== Early life and career ==
Kennedy earned his BS from Brigham Young University. While a student at BYU, Kennedy took two years off to serve as a missionary for the Church of Jesus Christ of Latter-day Saints.

He earned his MD from Michigan State University and his JD from Brigham Young University's J. Reuben Clark Law School while taking law classes at night and running his medical practice during the day. Kennedy lives in Alpine, Utah, where he works as a family doctor for Premier Family Medical Group.

== Political career ==
When District 27 incumbent Republican Representative John Dougall ran for state auditor and left the seat open, Kennedy was selected as one of two candidates from five by the Republican convention for the June 26, 2012 Republican primary which he won with 2,586 votes (52.9%) and won the November 6, 2012 general election with 14,335 votes (92.1%) against Constitution candidate Scott Morgan.

During the 2014 general election, Kennedy faced Democratic nominee William McGree, winning with 6,997 votes (88.4%).

During the 2016 legislative session, Kennedy served on the Public Education Appropriations Subcommittee, the House Health and Human Services Committee, and the House Political Subdivisions Committee.

On March 9, 2018, Kennedy distributed a letter to members of District 27 announcing that he would not seek re-election for the Utah House of Representatives. He instead opted to run for the U.S. Senate. On April 22, 2018, Kennedy edged out Mitt Romney at the Republican Convention with 50.88% of the delegate votes. Romney came in a close second with 49.12%, allowing both to compete in the primary on June 26, 2018, but Kennedy would lose the primary to Mitt Romney.

Kennedy drew attention as a vocal supporter of gun rights, even meeting with UtahGunExchange.com, a private gun exchange that would later have a presence at March For Our Lives near the Utah Capitol and the 2018 Chicago Peace March and Rally, where their militaristic vehicle included a replica .50-caliber machine gun.

== U.S. House of Representatives ==
=== Elections ===
==== 2024 ====
Kennedy announced his candidacy for Utah's 3rd congressional district on January 4, 2024, two days after the district's Representative John Curtis announced his candidacy for the United States Senate.

==== 2026 ====
Due to court-ordered redistricting in Utah, Kennedy's home in Alpine was drawn into the 4th district, while fellow Republican and 2nd district incumbent Celeste Maloy was drawn into the 3rd. Kennedy sought reelection in the 4th. That district was held by fellow Republican Burgess Owens, and had been pushed to the south and east after losing most of Salt Lake City to the new 1st. While the new 4th was more Owens' district than Kennedy's, Owens opted to retire.

=== Tenure ===
Rep. Kennedy was sworn in to the 119th Congress on January 3, 2025.

==== April 2025 Trip to El Salvador ====
In April 2025, Kennedy traveled to El Salvador and received a tour of Terrorism Confinement Center (CECOT), a maximum security prison used by the Trump administration to hold U.S. immigrants removed from the United States, including immigrants like Kilmar Abrego Garcia who were transported to the prison. After visiting the CECOT prison camp, Kennedy did not call for the repatriation of Kilmar Abrego Garcia.

=== Committee assignments ===
For the 119th Congress:

- Committee on Natural Resources
  - Subcommittee on Federal Lands (Vice Chair)
  - Subcommittee on Indian and Insular Affairs
- Committee on Science, Space, and Technology
  - Subcommittee on Research and Technology
  - Subcommittee on Space and Aeronautics
- Committee on Transportation and Infrastructure
  - Subcommittee on Economic Development, Public Buildings and Emergency Management
  - Subcommittee on Highways and Transit
  - Subcommittee on Railroads, Pipelines, and Hazardous Materials

=== Caucus memberships ===
- Congressional Western Caucus
- Republican Study Committee

U.S. House of Representatives
Preceded by John Curtis	Member of the U.S. House of Representatives from Utah's 3rd congressional district 2025–present	Incumbent
Preceded by Burgess Owens	Member of the U.S. House of Representatives from Utah's 4th congressional district Taking office 2027	Elect
U.S. order of precedence (ceremonial)
Preceded by Julie Johnson	United States representatives by seniority 393rd	Succeeded by Brad Knott
