= 2022 United States House of Representatives elections in Utah =

- November 8, 2022

All 4 Utah seats to the United States House of Representatives
	Majority party	Minority party
Party	Republican	Democratic
Last election	4	0
Seats won	4	0
Seat change	Steady	Steady
Popular vote	670,078	342,021
Percentage	63.08%	32.20%
Swing	▲2.10%	▼3.13%

Republican
40–50%
50–60%
60–70%
70–80%
80–90%
>90%
Democratic
40–50%
50–60%

The 2022 United States House of Representatives elections in Utah were held on November 8, 2022, to elect the four U.S. representatives from the state of Utah, one from each of the state's four congressional districts. The elections coincided with other elections to the House of Representatives, elections to the United States Senate and various state and local elections.

== Overview ==
Party	Candi- dates	Votes		Seats	
Party	Candi- dates	No.	%	No.	+/–
Republican Party	4	670,078	63.02%	4	Steady
Democratic Party	4	342,021	32.16%	0	Steady
United Utah	2	25,333	2.38%	0	Steady
Constitution Party	2	12,536	1.18%	0	Steady
Libertarian Party	1	8,287	0.78%	0	Steady
Independent American Party	1	4,035	0.38%	0	Steady
Total	14	1,062,315	100.0%	4	Steady

== District 1 ==
2022 Utah's 1st congressional district election
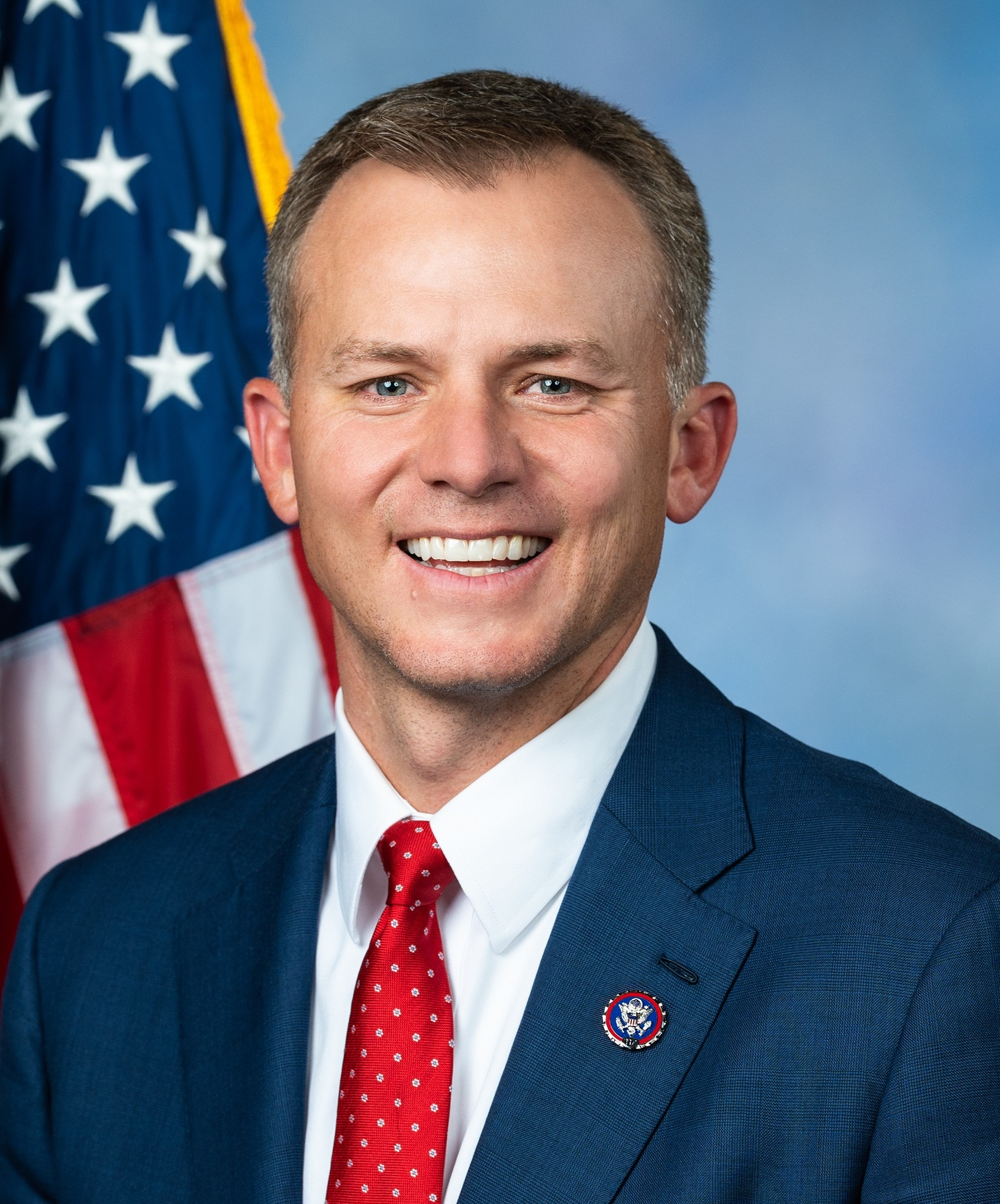

Nominee	Blake Moore	Rick Jones
Party	Republican	Democratic
Popular vote	178,434	87,986
Percentage	66.97%	33.03%
- County results Moore: 60–70% 70–80% 80–90% Jones: 50–60% 70–80%
U.S. Representative before election
Blake Moore
Republican
Elected U.S. Representative
Blake Moore
Republican

The 1st district is located in northern Utah, including the cities of Ogden, Logan, Park City, Layton, Clearfield, and the northern half of the Great Salt Lake. The incumbent was Republican Blake Moore, who was elected with 69.5% of the vote in 2020.

=== Republican primary ===
==== Candidates ====
===== Nominee =====
- Blake Moore, incumbent U.S. Representative

===== Eliminated in primary =====
- Andrew Badger, marketing director
- Tina Cannon, former Morgan County councilor and candidate for this district in 2020

===== Eliminated at convention =====
- Bill Campbell, businessman, accountant and activist
- Julie Fullmer, mayor of Vineyard

==== Endorsements ====
Tina Cannon

Federal officials

- Rob Bishop, former U.S. Representative

==== Debate ====
2022 Utah's 1st congressional district republican primary debate
No.	Date	Host	Moderator	Link	Republican	Republican	Republican
Key: P Participant A Absent N Not invited I Invited W Withdrawn							
Key: P Participant A Absent N Not invited I Invited W Withdrawn					Andrew Badger	Tina Cannon	Blake Moore
1	Jun. 2, 2022	Utah Debate Commission	Thomas Wright		P	P	P

==== Convention results ====
State Republican Convention results, 2022
Candidate	First ballot	Pct.	Second ballot	Pct.	Third ballot	Pct.
Andrew Badger	364	38.85%	451	49.18%	540	59.28%
Blake Moore	298	31.80%	325	35.44%	371	40.72%
Tina Cannon	108	11.53%	81	8.83%	Eliminated	
Julie Fullmer	90	9.61%	60	6.54%	Eliminated	
William Campbell	77	8.22%	Eliminated			
Total	937	100.00%	917	100.00%	911	100.00%

==== Polling ====
Poll source	Date(s) administered	Sample size (Note: Key: A – all adults RV – registered voters LV – likely voters V – unclear)	Margin of error	Andrew Badger	Tina Cannon	Blake Moore	Undecided
Dan Jones & Associates	May 24 – June 15, 2022	221 (RV)	± 6.6%	6%	5%	52%	37%

==== Primary results ====
Republican primary results
Party	Candidate	Votes	%
Republican	Blake Moore (incumbent)	58,408	57.6
Republican	Andrew Badger	28,437	28.0
Republican	Tina Cannon	14,577	14.4
Total votes		101,422	100.0

=== Democratic primary ===
==== Candidates ====
===== Nominee =====
- Rick Jones, nominee for state representative in 2018

=== General election ===
==== Debate ====
2022 Utah's 1st congressional district debate
No.	Date	Host	Moderator	Link	Republican	Democratic
Key: P Participant A Absent N Not invited I Invited W Withdrawn						
Key: P Participant A Absent N Not invited I Invited W Withdrawn					Blake Moore	Rick Jones
1	Oct. 10, 2022	Utah Debate Commission	Kerry Bringhurst		P	P

==== Predictions ====
Source	Ranking	As of
The Cook Political Report	Solid R	November 16, 2021
Inside Elections	Solid R	December 23, 2021
Sabato's Crystal Ball	Safe R	November 17, 2021
Politico	Solid R	April 5, 2022
RCP	Safe R	June 9, 2022
Fox News	Solid R	July 11, 2022
DDHQ	Solid R	July 20, 2022
538	Solid R	June 30, 2022

==== Polling ====
Poll source	Date(s) administered	Sample size	Margin of error	Blake Moore (R)	Rick Jones (D)	Other	Undecided
Lighthouse Research	Aug 30 – Sep 13, 2022	506 (LV)	± 4.4%	62%	32%	–	6%

==== Results ====
2022 Utah's 1st congressional district election
Party	Candidate	Votes	%
Republican	Blake Moore (incumbent)	178,434	67.0
Democratic	Rick Jones	87,986	33.0
Total votes		266,420	100.0
Republican hold			

== District 2 ==
2022 Utah's 2nd congressional district election
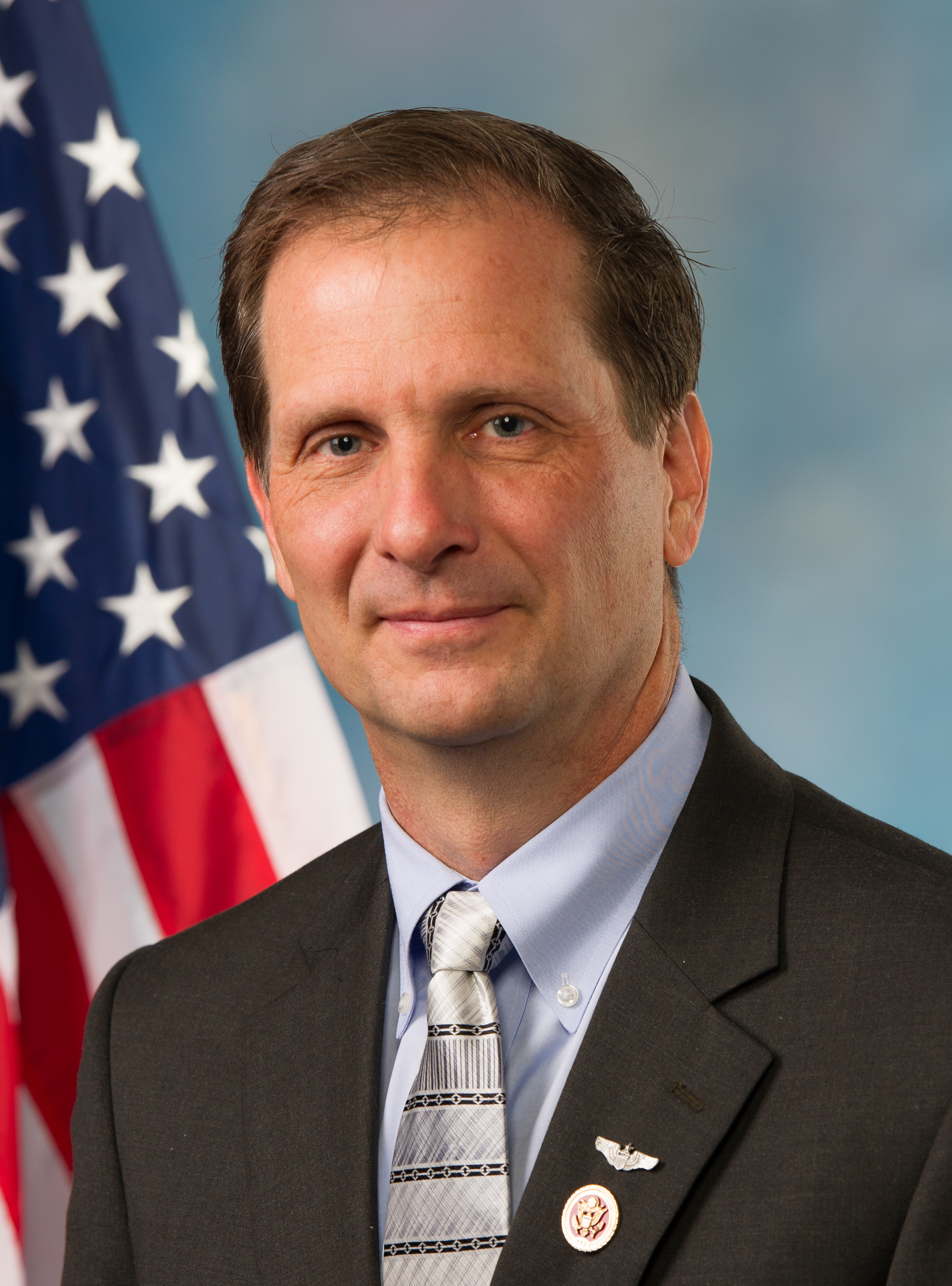

Nominee	Chris Stewart	Nick Mitchell
Party	Republican	Democratic
Popular vote	154,883	88,224
Percentage	59.71%	34.01%
- County results Stewart: 60–70% 70–80% 80–90% >90% Mitchell: 60–70%
U.S. Representative before election
Chris Stewart
Republican
Elected U.S. Representative
Chris Stewart
Republican

The 2nd district encompasses both Salt Lake City and the rural western and southern parts of the state. The incumbent was Republican Chris Stewart, who was re-elected with 59.0% of the vote in 2020.

=== Republican primary ===
==== Candidates ====
===== Nominee =====
- Chris Stewart, incumbent U.S. Representative

===== Eliminated in primary =====
- Erin Rider, attorney and former congressional staffer for Orrin Hatch

==== Endorsements ====
Chris Stewart

Federal officials

- Donald Trump, 45th president of the United States (2017–2021)

==== Convention results ====
State Republican Convention results, 2022
Candidate	First ballot	Pct.
Chris Stewart	657	84.34%
Erin Rider	122	15.66%
Total	779	100.00%

==== Primary results ====
Republican primary results
Party	Candidate	Votes	%
Republican	Chris Stewart (incumbent)	75,586	72.6
Republican	Erin Rider	28,480	27.4
Total votes		104,066	100.0

=== Democratic primary ===
==== Candidates ====
===== Nominee =====
- Nicholas Mitchell, scientist and business owner

===== Eliminated at convention =====
- Steve Hartwick, nominee for state senate in 2016

==== Convention results ====
2022 Utah Democratic Convention results preliminary
Candidate	Pct.
Nick Mitchell	60.18%
Steve Hartwick	39.82%
Total	100.00%

=== United Utah Party ===
==== Candidates ====
===== Declared =====
- Jay McFarland, radio personality and Republican candidate for Utah's 4th congressional district in 2020

=== General election ===
==== Debate ====
2022 Utah's 2nd congressional district debate
No.	Date	Host	Moderator	Link	Republican	Democratic	United Utah	Constitution
Key: P Participant A Absent N Not invited I Invited W Withdrawn								
Key: P Participant A Absent N Not invited I Invited W Withdrawn					Chris Stewart	Nicholas Mitchell	Jay McFarland	Cassie Easley
1	Oct. 14, 2022	Utah Debate Commission	Boyd Matheson		P	P	N	P

==== Predictions ====
Source	Ranking	As of
The Cook Political Report	Solid R	November 16, 2021
Inside Elections	Solid R	December 23, 2021
Sabato's Crystal Ball	Safe R	November 17, 2021
Politico	Solid R	April 5, 2022
RCP	Safe R	June 9, 2022
Fox News	Solid R	July 11, 2022
DDHQ	Solid R	July 20, 2022
538	Solid R	June 30, 2022

==== Polling ====
Poll source	Date(s) administered	Sample size	Margin of error	Chris Stewart (R)	Nick Mitchell (D)	Other	Undecided
Lighthouse Research	Aug 30 – Sep 13, 2022	508 (LV)	± 4.4%	50%	31%	10% (Note: Easly with 6%; McFarland with 4%)	9%

==== Results ====
2022 Utah's 2nd congressional district election
Party	Candidate	Votes	%
Republican	Chris Stewart (incumbent)	154,883	59.7
Democratic	Nicholas Mitchell	88,224	34.0
United Utah	Jay McFarland	8,622	3.3
Constitution	Cassie Easley	7,670	3.0
Total votes		259,399	100.0
Republican hold			

== District 3 ==
2022 Utah's 3rd congressional district election
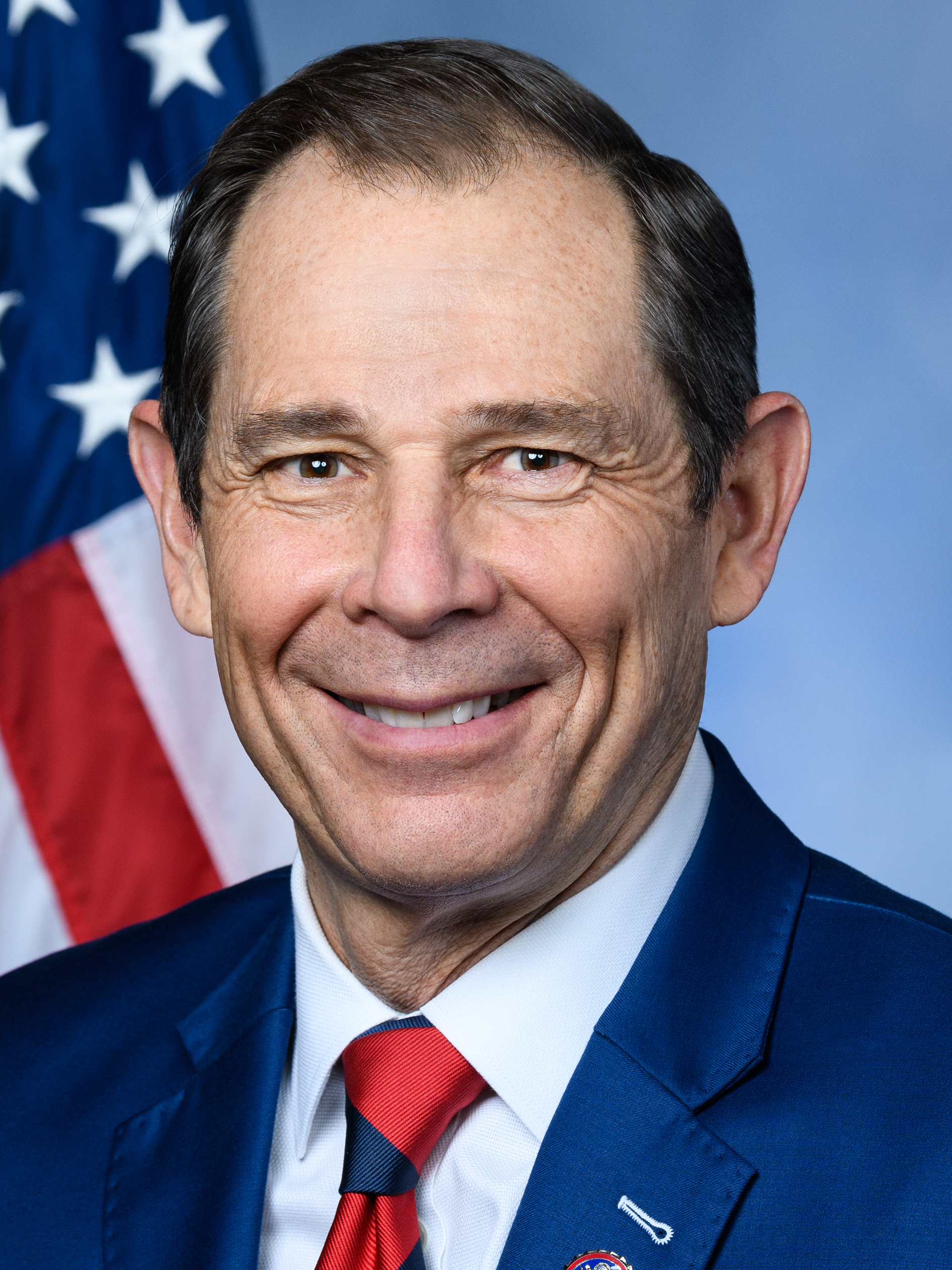

Nominee	John Curtis	Glenn Wright
Party	Republican	Democratic
Popular vote	182,497	83,687
Percentage	64.40%	29.53%
- County results Curtis: 40–50% 50–60% 60–70% 70–80% 80–90% Wright: 40–50%
U.S. Representative before election
John Curtis
Republican
Elected U.S. Representative
John Curtis
Republican

The 3rd district includes rural southeastern Utah, stretches into the Provo-Orem metro area, and takes in the southeastern Salt Lake City suburbs of Holladay, Cottonwood Heights, Sandy, and Draper. The incumbent was Republican John Curtis, who was re-elected with 68.8% of the vote in 2020.

=== Republican primary ===
==== Candidates ====
===== Nominee =====
- John Curtis, incumbent U.S. Representative

===== Eliminated in primary =====
- Chris Herrod, former state representative and candidate for this district in 2017 and 2018

===== Eliminated at convention =====
- Tim Aalders, perennial candidate
- Jason Preston, businessman
- Lyman Wight

==== Endorsements ====
John Curtis

Organizations

- Citizens for Responsible Energy Solutions

==== Convention results ====
State Republican Convention results, 2022
Candidate	First ballot	Pct.	Second ballot	Pct.
Chris Herrod	302	29.41%	558	54.71%
John Curtis	429	41.77%	462	45.29%
Jason Preston	185	18.01%	Eliminated	
Tim Aalders	106	10.32%	Eliminated	
Lyman Wight	5	0.49%	Eliminated	
Total	1027	100.00%	1020	100.00%

==== Polling ====
Poll source	Date(s) administered	Sample size	Margin of error	John Curtis	Chris Herrod	Undecided
Dan Jones & Associates	May 24 – Jun 15, 2022	340 (RV)	± 5.3%	44%	14%	42%

==== Debate ====
2022 Utah's 3rd congressional district republican primary debate
No.	Date	Host	Moderator	Link	Republican	Republican
Key: P Participant A Absent N Not invited I Invited W Withdrawn						
Key: P Participant A Absent N Not invited I Invited W Withdrawn					John Curtis	Chris Herrod
1	Jun. 1, 2022	Utah Debate Commission	Natalie Gochnour		A	P

==== Primary results ====
Republican primary results
Party	Candidate	Votes	%
Republican	John Curtis (incumbent)	78,341	69.6
Republican	Chris Herrod	34,204	30.4
Total votes		112,545	100.0

=== Democratic primary ===
==== Candidates ====
===== Nominee =====
- Glenn Wright, Summit County councilman

===== Eliminated at convention =====
- Archie Williams III, perennial candidate

==== Endorsements ====
Archie Williams III

Organizations

- Democrats for Life of America

==== Convention results ====
Utah Democratic Convention results, 2022 preliminary
Candidate	Pct.
Glenn Wright	91.22%
Archie Williams III	8.78%
Total	100.00%

=== Libertarian convention ===
==== Candidates ====
===== Nominee =====
- Michael Stoddard, financial planner

=== Constitution Party ===
==== Candidates ====
===== Nominee =====
- Daniel Clyde Cummings, perennial candidate

=== Independent American Party ===
==== Candidates ====
===== Nominee =====
- Aaron Heineman, perennial candidate

=== General election ===
==== Debate ====
2022 Utah's 1st congressional district debate
No.	Date	Host	Moderator	Link	Republican	Democratic
Key: P Participant A Absent N Not invited I Invited W Withdrawn						
Key: P Participant A Absent N Not invited I Invited W Withdrawn					Blake Moore	Rick Jones
1	Oct. 6, 2022	Utah Debate Commission	Natalie Gochnour		P	P

==== Predictions ====
Source	Ranking	As of
The Cook Political Report	Solid R	November 16, 2021
Inside Elections	Solid R	December 23, 2021
Sabato's Crystal Ball	Safe R	November 17, 2021
Politico	Solid R	April 5, 2022
RCP	Safe R	June 9, 2022
Fox News	Solid R	July 11, 2022
DDHQ	Solid R	July 20, 2022
538	Solid R	June 30, 2022

==== Polling ====
Poll source	Date(s) administered	Sample size	Margin of error	John Curtis (R)	Glenn Wright (D)	Other	Undecided
Lighthouse Research	Aug 30 – Sep 13, 2022	504 (LV)	± 4.4%	51%	27%	13% (Note: Heineman and Stoddard with 5%; Cummings with 3%)	9%

==== Results ====
2022 Utah's 3rd congressional district election
Party	Candidate	Votes	%
Republican	John Curtis (incumbent)	182,497	64.4
Democratic	Glenn Wright	83,687	29.5
Libertarian	Michael Stoddard	8,287	2.9
Constitution	Daniel Cummings	4,874	1.7
Independent American	Aaron Heineman	4,035	1.4
Total votes		283,380	100.0
Republican hold			

== District 4 ==
2022 Utah's 4th congressional district election
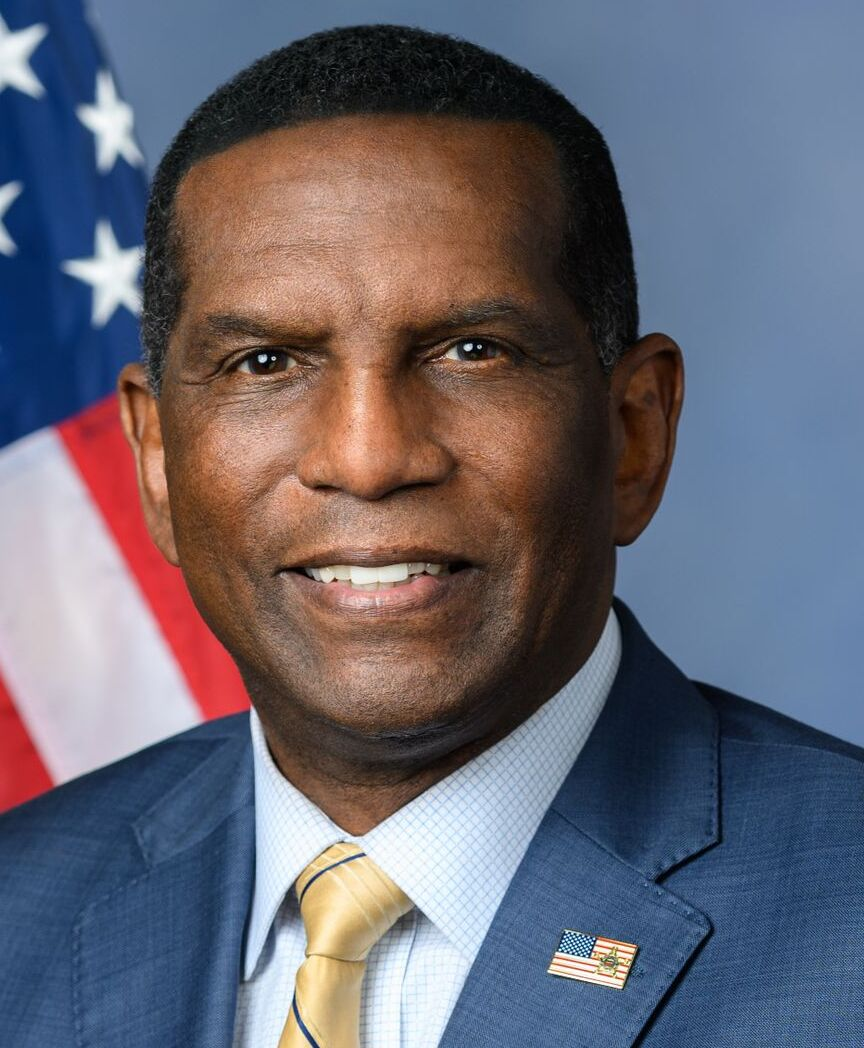

Nominee	Burgess Owens	Darlene McDonald	January Walker
Party	Republican	Democratic	United Utah
Alliance			Forward
Popular vote	155,110	82,181	16,740
Percentage	61.05%	32.35%	6.59%
- County results Owens: 50–60% 70–80% 80–90%
U.S. Representative before election
Burgess Owens
Republican
Elected U.S. Representative
Burgess Owens
Republican

The 4th district is based in southwest Salt Lake County, taking in parts of West Valley City and Salt Lake City, as well as South Salt Lake, Taylorsville, Murray, West Jordan, Midvale, South Jordan, Riverton, Herriman, and Bluffdale. The district also stretches south into eastern Utah County, western Juab County, and northern Sanpete County. The incumbent was Republican Burgess Owens, who flipped the district and was elected with 47.7% of the vote in 2020.

=== Republican primary ===
==== Candidates ====
===== Nominee =====
- Burgess Owens, incumbent U.S. Representative

===== Eliminated in primary =====
- Jake Hunsaker, technology executive and ex-financial analyst

===== Withdrew =====
- Nick Huey, creative consultant and climate change activist

==== Endorsements ====
Burgess Owens

Federal officials

- Tim Scott, U.S. Senator from South Carolina
- Donald Trump, 45th president of the United States (2017–2021)

Organizations

- Black America's Political Action Committee

==== Convention results ====
State Republican Convention results, 2022
Candidate	First ballot	Pct.
Burgess Owens	561	68.83%
Jake Hunsaker	254	31.17%
Total	815	100.00%

==== Debate ====
2022 Utah's 4th congressional district republican primary debate
No.	Date	Host	Moderator	Link	Republican	Republican
Key: P Participant A Absent N Not invited I Invited W Withdrawn						
Key: P Participant A Absent N Not invited I Invited W Withdrawn					Jake Hunsaker	Burgess Owens
1	Jun. 1, 2022	Utah Debate Commission	Jason Perry		P	A

==== Primary results ====
Republican primary results
Party	Candidate	Votes	%
Republican	Burgess Owens (incumbent)	56,397	61.9
Republican	Jake Hunsaker	34,728	38.1
Total votes		91,125	100.0

=== Democratic primary ===
==== Candidates ====
===== Nominee =====
- Darlene McDonald, activist, DNC delegate, and candidate for this seat in 2018

=== United Utah Party ===
==== Candidates ====
===== Nominee =====
- January Walker, businesswoman and cybersecurity professional

=== General election ===
==== Debate ====
2022 Utah's 4th congressional district debates
No.	Date	Host	Moderator	Link	Republican	Democratic	United Utah
Key: P Participant A Absent N Not invited I Invited W Withdrawn							
Key: P Participant A Absent N Not invited I Invited W Withdrawn					Burgess Owens	Darlene McDonald	January Walker
1	Oct. 12, 2022	Utah Debate Commission	Lauren Gustus		A	P	P

==== Predictions ====
Source	Ranking	As of
The Cook Political Report	Solid R	November 16, 2021
Inside Elections	Solid R	December 23, 2021
Sabato's Crystal Ball	Safe R	November 17, 2021
Politico	Solid R	April 5, 2022
RCP	Safe R	June 9, 2022
Fox News	Solid R	July 11, 2022
DDHQ	Solid R	July 20, 2022
538	Solid R	June 30, 2022

==== Polling ====
Poll source	Date(s) administered	Sample size	Margin of error	Burgess Owens (R)	Darlene McDonald (D)	Other	Undecided
Lighthouse Research	Aug 30 – Sep 13, 2022	504 (LV)	± 4.4%	57%	30%	6% (Note: Walker with 6%)	7%

==== Results ====
2022 Utah's 4th congressional district election
Party	Candidate	Votes	%
Republican	Burgess Owens (incumbent)	155,110	61.0
Democratic	Darlene McDonald	82,181	32.4
United Utah	January Walker	16,740	6.6
Independent	Jonathan L. Peterson (write-in)	25	0.0
Total votes		254,056	100.0
Republican hold			
