= Tina Cannon =

American politician (born 1968)

Auditor of Utah
- Incumbent
- Assumed office January 6, 2025
- Governor: Spencer Cox
- Preceded by: John Dougall

Personal details
- Born: March 1968 (age 58) Box Elder County, Utah, U.S.
- Party: Republican
- Education: Utah State University (BS)

Tina M. Cannon (born March 1968) is an American politician who serves as the Utah State Auditor since 2025.

Cannon graduated from Utah State University. After several years with Lunsford & Peck, she began Allred & Cannon.

Cannon first became involved in politics by working on Rob Bishop's political campaign in 2002. She served two terms on the county council for Morgan County. She is also a former chair of the county's Republican Party.

After Bishop announced he would not run for reelection to the United States House of Representatives in Utah's 1st congressional district in the 2020 elections, Cannon announced her candidacy for the seat. She was eliminated at the Republican Party convention. Cannon ran again in the 2022 elections, but was again eliminated in the primary.

With John Dougall, the Utah State Auditor, not running for another term in the 2024 elections after holding the position since 2013, Cannon announced her candidacy. In the Republican Party primary, Cannon defeated Ricky Hatch, the county clerk of Weber County. Cannon won the general election, defeating Democratic Party nominee Catherine Voutaz and Constitution Party nominee Jeffrey Ostler. She was sworn into office on January 6, 2025.

Political offices
Preceded by John Dougall	Auditor of Utah; 2025–present	Incumbent
