= What America Thinks =

- Genre: American public opinion
- Country of origin: United States

Production
- Running time: 30 minutes

Original release
- Release: September 3, 2012 – present

What America Thinks is a syndicated American television show. It was hosted by opinion pollster and political commentator Scott Rasmussen from 2012 to 2013, and is currently hosted by Alex Boyer. WCBS-TV is the anchor station. The program, which is syndicated on over 120 stations, is produced by Telco Productions and Rasmussen Reports.

== Format ==
The program features discussions of current events and public opinion with a guest panel. Guests have included Scott Walker, Howard Dean, and Rand Paul. An episode of the show, titled What New Hampshire Thinks, won a 2012 Granite Mike Award from the New Hampshire Association of Broadcasters. In June 2013, 60 additional stations signed up to air the show beginning on July 21, 2013, bringing the total number of stations airing the show to over 120.

== Episodes ==
The following is a list of the show's episodes:

Date	Description	Guests
September 9, 2012	Economy, national security, healthcare	Christopher Preble, William Kristol, Mitchell Brooks, Michael Murphy
September 14, 2012	Economic policy, Election 2012, auto bailouts	Bernard Whitman, Kyle Harrington, Kristen Soltis, Emily Tisch Sussman, Rich Benjamin, John Bramnick
September 22, 2012	Wisconsin politics, public employee pensions	Scott Walker, Scott Ross, Deb Jordahl, Kristen Soltis, Emily Tisch Sussman
September 29, 2012	2012 presidential debates, Sino-American relations	Charles B. Rangel, Joe Kyrillos, Mary Kissel, Tara Dowdell, Brian O’Shaughnessy
October 6, 2012	Government bailouts, Election 2012	Neil Barofsky, William McGurn, Dan Gerstein
October 13, 2012	Election 2012, healthcare policy	Cathy Areu, Dee Dee Benkie, Richard Firshein, Betsy McCaughey
October 20, 2012	Economic policy, presidential debates	Rich Benjamin, Jeremy Goldberg, Steven Some, Robert Brusca
October 27, 2012	Foreign policy, election polling	Michael Balboni, Terra Lawson-Remer, Brian Benjamin, Josh Nass
November 3, 2012	Swing states, Electoral College	Dee Dee Benkie, John Hlinko
November 10, 2012	Election 2012	Bernard Whitman, Olivier Knox, Bethany Blankley
November 17, 2012	Economic policy, public opinion on current events	Matt McCall, John Tabacco
November 24, 2012	Taxes, immigration, war on drugs, Hurricane Sandy	Paul Conway, Jeanette Pavini
December 1, 2012	Fiscal cliff, healthcare policy, sports	Cathy Areu, Dee Dee Benkie, Jeremy Schaap
December 9, 2012	Fiscal cliff, immigration	Larry Kudlow, Cathy Areu, Dee Dee Benkie
December 15, 2012	Presidential approval ratings, tax policy, war on drugs	Emily Tisch Sussman, Grover Norquist, Guy Benson
December 22, 2012	Sandy Hook Elementary School shooting, fiscal cliff, public opinion on the holiday season	Frank Pavone, Aryeh Spero, Tom Cole
December 29, 2012	Fiscal cliff, foreign policy	Frank Pavone, Aryeh Spero, Terra Lawson-Remer, Michael Cohen
January 5, 2013	Economic policy, gun policy	Emily Tisch Sussman, Stephen Moore, Isabel Sawhill, Kate Obenshain
January 6, 2013	Year in review	Olivier Knox, Dee Dee Benkie, Cathy Areu, Paul Conway, Jeremy Schaap
January 12, 2013	Chuck Hagel, 2012 Benghazi attack, Environmental Protection Agency, Tea Party movement	Mike Barrett, Scottie Nell Hughes
January 19, 2013	Gun control, debt ceiling, Barack Obama's presidency	Jon Cohen, Olivier Knox
January 26, 2013	Keystone Pipeline, abortion, tax policy	Christian Dorsey, Douglas Holtz-Eakin, Mark Meckler
February 2, 2013	Women in combat, immigration	Jim DeMint, Edward Alden, Jack Martin
February 9, 2013	State of the Union address, healthcare reform	Michael Tanner, Henry Aaron, Sean Trende
February 16, 2013	State of the Union address analysis	Howard Dean, Bob Corker
February 23, 2013	Foreign policy, federal deficit, Wall Street bailouts	Rand Paul, Marjorie Clifton, Alice Stewart
March 2, 2013	Sequestration, analysis of how the Republican Party has lost its way	Michael Barone, Pedro da Costa, A.B. Stoddard, Caitlin Huey-Burns
March 8, 2013	Partisanship in Washington, America's Mandarin class	Megan McArdle, Michael Barone, Pedro da Costa
March 16, 2013	The U.S. budget debate	Christian Dorsey, David Winston, Tom Price
March 23, 2013	The U.S. budget debate, Obama's approval ratings	Caren Bohan, Marsha Blackburn, Bob Cusack
March 30, 2013	Government involvement with banks, same-sex marriage	Mark Calabria, Patrick Sims, Kristen Soltis, Emily Tisch Sussman
April 5, 2013	Gun control, poverty	Peter Cove, Kristen Soltis, Emily Tisch Sussman
April 13, 2013	President Obama's budget plan, poverty	Gretchen Hamel, Rep. Barbara Lee, Rex Nutting
April 19, 2013	Immigration, same-sex marriage	Rep. Chellie Pingree, Ana Avendaño, Dan Stein
April 27, 2013	U.S. national security, post-bailout era Wall Street	Stewart Verdery, Joseph Cirincione, Sheila Bair
May 4, 2013	Immigration, Keystone XL pipeline, surveillance in public places	Rep. Bill Johnson, Rep. Gregory W. Meeks
May 11, 2013	Benghazi hearings, crisis in Syria	Christopher Preble, Rep. Adam B. Schiff, Christopher Griffin
May 18, 2013	IRS targeting of Tea Party groups, immigration reform	Rick C. Wade, Kevin McKechnie, Sean Trende
May 24, 2013	Public opinion on health care, controversies in Washington, Memorial Day, 2014 mid-term elections	Jessie Jane Duff, Larry Sabato
June 1, 2013	Public reaction to Eric Holder, investigations in Washington and how the press is responding, marijuana legalization	Mark Tapscott, Patrick J. Kennedy
June 8, 2013	Immigration reform, freedom of the press	David Vitter, David Rehr, Jeffrey McCall
