= ESPN Radio =

Sports radio network

- Type: Radio network
- Country: United States
- Headquarters: ESPN Plaza, 935 Middle Street, Bristol, Connecticut

Programming
- Format: Sports radio

Ownership
- Owner: ESPN, LLC
- Operator: Good Karma Sports

History
- Founded: 1991
- Launch date: January 1, 1992

Coverage
- Availability: National, through regional affiliates and satellite radio

Links
- Webcast: SiriusXM; Listen live (via TuneIn); Listen live (via iHeartRadio)
- Website: www.espn.com/espnradio/index

ESPN Radio, which is alternatively branded platform-agnostically as ESPN Audio, is an American sports radio network and extension of the ESPN television network. It was launched on January 1, 1992, under the banner "SportsRadio ESPN". The network is based at the ESPN campus in Bristol, Connecticut, with multiple studio facilities nationwide, along with home studios. The network airs a regular schedule of daily and weekly programming as well as live radio play-by-play of sporting events.

ESPN Radio is broadcast to hundreds of affiliate stations, along with national and Canadian carriage on SiriusXM. The network's content is also available online through its affiliates via Audacy, iHeartRadio and TuneIn, and the network also makes its programming available via podcast feeds and providers, with some additional content audio and video available through an ESPN+ subscription. Several of its programs are also featured as fully live or "best-of" video simulcasts on the ESPN family of television networks.

== History ==
Logo (1992–2008)

ESPN Radio was preceded ten years prior by the Enterprise Radio Network. In January 1981, four months after ESPN co-founders Bill and Scott Rasmussen had been forced out of ESPN television's operations, the father and son—who still held minority stakes in ESPN at the time—launched the Enterprise network as a separate, competing operation. The network failed in September of that year.

ESPN Radio Network was formed in September 1991 by ESPN Inc. and Capital Cities/ABC, Inc.'s ABC Radio Networks. Twenty-five stations had already signed on as affiliates at its September 5, 1991 announcement, with an expected total of 200 at the January launch. Shelby Whitfield, executive producer of ABC Radio Sports, and John A. Walsh, executive editor of ESPN, were placed in charge of the venture. The network launched as Sports Radio ESPN on January 1, 1992. At first, ESPN Radio broadcast only on weekends. The network debuted with 16 hours running on 147 affiliates in 43 states. Its initial programming consisted of news shows, update segments, and occasional features.

By 1996, ESPN Radio had expanded to weekdays with a show hosted by The Fabulous Sports Babe (Nancy Donnellan). One hour of that show was simulcast on ESPN2 (1-2 p.m. Eastern time). Two years later, Tony Bruno and Mike Golic were brought together for a new morning show, the Bruno & Golic Morning Show which aired until Bruno left the network in 2000. Mike Greenberg was named as Bruno's replacement, and the morning show became Mike & Mike, which aired until 2017 (and was also simulcast on ESPN2). In January 2010, Mike & Mike celebrated their 10-year anniversary on ESPN Radio. Dan Patrick was a mainstay in the afternoons until his departure from ESPN in 2007.

Gradually, ESPN added more dayparts and became a 24-hour service. In 1995, ESPN Radio gained national radio rights to the NBA. In 1997, it gained the national radio rights to MLB. Disney purchased WEVD from the Forward Association in September 2002 to become WEPN, ESPN Radio's flagship station. On June 12, 2007, Disney spun off and merged its ABC Radio Networks with Citadel Broadcasting into Citadel Communications while retaining its ESPN Radio and Radio Disney networks and stations.

ESPN Radio is streamed over 215 stations and is ranked first nationally as a sports broadcasting program. The parent company ESPN focused on radio as of 2006. With more resources and money spent on it, ESPN radio expanded rapidly.

On July 28, 2023, amid layoffs occurring across ESPN, Good Karma Brands (now Good Karma Sports as of August 2026)—an operator of ESPN Radio affiliates in multiple markets that had also acquired the network's New York, Los Angeles, and Chicago flagships in 2021—assumed the day-to-day operations and advertising sales for the ESPN Radio network.

== Programming ==
=== Broadcast rights ===
- NBA on ESPN Radio (since 1996)
- College Football on ESPN Radio, including the Bowl Championship Series, then the College Football Playoff (since 2000)
- Major League Baseball on ESPN Radio, Including the MLB All Star Game, MLB Postseason games, and World Series games (since 1998)
- NFL Football Sunday on ESPN Radio (since 2013)
- Caribbean Series (since 2015)
- ESPN FC Presents: EFL Championship on ESPN Radio (since 2016)
- ESPN FC Presents: La Liga, on ESPN Radio (since 2016)

=== Past rights ===
- ESPN FC Presents: UEFA Euro on ESPN Radio (2012, 2016, 2020, along with Champions League, Europa League and Super Cup)
- FIFA World Cup on ESPN Radio (2010, 2014)
- FIFA Women's World Cup on ESPN Radio (2011)
- MLS Soccer Sunday on ESPN Radio (2015–2022)
- MLS Cup on ESPN Radio (2007-2014)
- NIT on ESPN Radio (2002–2011)
- The Open Championship on ESPN Radio (2010–2015)
- U.S. Open on ESPN Radio (2010–2014)
- Live @ Wimbledon on ESPN Radio (2012–2013)
- World Baseball Classic (2013, 2017)

=== Daily segments ===
- ESPN Radio SportsCenter
- SportsBeat
- Extra Point

== ESPN Radio stations ==
Prior to 2022, ESPN Radio had four company-owned and/or operated stations in New York City, Los Angeles, Chicago, and Dallas, as well as in Pittsburgh prior to 2010, with the Chicago station managed by Good Karma Brands, which owns and operates a number of other ESPN Radio stations in Wisconsin, Ohio and Florida. The Dallas station was operated by Cumulus Media until October 2020, when ESPN took back operational control. Before the conversion of the sites to general blog presences requiring an ESPN+ subscription to access, each station was partnered with an ESPN local website named for the city and featuring a completely separate staff of sportswriters and reporters for each market who gave their local viewpoints of local sports (for example, espnnewyork.com for New York); some stations remain hosted on ESPN.com, including audio and FCC disclosures. Most other markets have ESPN Radio affiliates, whether they be part-time or have their entire format dedicated to ESPN Radio.

WEPN converted back to ESPN Radio after the demise of ESPN Deportes Radio in 2019. All the other owned or operated stations were sold; WEPN, KSPN, WMVP, and WEPN-FM's local marketing agreements were sold to Good Karma Brands, while KESN was being sold to the religious VCY America network. The sales to Good Karma Brands and VCY America closed in 2022, with all of the Good Karma stations remaining a part of ESPN Radio. On June 12, 2023, Disney sold KRDC, its last broadcast radio asset, to Calvary Chapel Costa Mesa, for $5 million, the station had carried a simulcast of KSPN along with selected overflow programming during the sale process after the wind-down of the Radio Disney network in 2021. The sale closed on September 8 of that year, with KRDC changing its callsign to KWVE and subsequently simulcasting the existing KWVE-FM.

=== Satellite radio ===
ESPN Xtra is a satellite radio station that carries sports talk programming produced by ESPN. The channel was originally on XM 141, but is now broadcast on SiriusXM Radio channel 81. XM announced the addition of this channel on January 28, 2008. Sirius Satellite Radio announced changes to its audio simulcast of ESPNEWS, now called ESPN All Access, on December 12, 2007, but would not be adding any content announced for XM, as it will be exclusive to XM.

== See also ==
- Fox Sports Radio
- Westwood One Sports
- NBC Sports Radio
- Sports Byline USA
- TSN Radio
- SportsMap
