= 2020 United States presidential election in Utah =

- November 3, 2020
- Turnout: 90.09% (of registered voters) ▲

Nominee	Donald Trump	Joe Biden
Party	Republican	Democratic
Home state	Florida	Delaware
Running mate	Mike Pence	Kamala Harris
Electoral vote	6	0
Popular vote	865,140	560,282
Percentage	58.13%	37.65%

Trump
40–50%
50–60%
60–70%
70–80%
80–90%
90–100%
Biden
40–50%
50–60%
60–70%
70–80%
80–90%
90–100%
Tie/No Data
President before election
Donald Trump
Republican
Elected President
Joe Biden
Democratic

The 2020 United States presidential election in Utah was held on Tuesday, November 3, 2020, as part of the 2020 United States presidential election in which all 50 states plus the District of Columbia participated. Utah voters chose electors to represent them in the Electoral College via a popular vote, pitting the Republican Party's nominee, incumbent President Donald Trump, and running mate Vice President Mike Pence against Democratic Party nominee, former Vice President Joe Biden, and his running mate California Senator Kamala Harris. Utah had six electoral votes in the Electoral College.

Prior to the election, all leading news organizations projected Utah as leaning towards Trump, or a safe red state. Throughout the campaign, Trump did not exceed 60% in a single poll conducted. Some polls even showed the president leading by single digits against Biden, likely indicating a closer than normal contest in this traditionally Republican stronghold. In past elections, Utah has often given massive support to Republican candidates, including having awarded George W. Bush and Mitt Romney over 70% of the vote in 2004 and 2012, respectively.

In 2020, Trump won Utah with 58.1% of the vote and a margin of 20.5%, which although an improvement on his 18.1% margin over Hillary Clinton in 2016, is still relatively narrow compared to the performance of past Republican nominees. He performed strongly in rural areas, as well as in some larger counties like Utah (Provo), Davis (Farmington), and Weber (Ogden). Trump improved over his 45.5% plurality win in 2016, due in part to the lack of a strong third-party presence, as Evan McMullin had earned 21.5% of the vote in 2016 but did not run in 2020; he endorsed Biden. The election was far more of a two-party contest in 2020, with third parties receiving 4.2% of the vote, compared to 27% in 2016. Despite this, the Associated Press reported a less partisan and more cooperative cultural environment in Utah compared to other states during the election.

With no major third-party challenges, Trump improved his vote share by 13% while Biden improved on Hillary Clinton's 2016 results by 10.3 percentage points. Biden's improvement garnered him the highest percentage by a Democratic presidential nominee in Utah since Lyndon Johnson won with 54.9% of the vote in 1964, as Biden overtook the vote shares of Hubert Humphrey in 1968, Barack Obama in 2008, and Jimmy Carter in 1976 (the only other Democratic nominees to surpass a third of the state's vote since 1964). Biden's greatest support came from Salt Lake County, the state's most populous county, where he won 53.7%, the first outright majority for a Democratic nominee in the county since Johnson in 1964. Biden also won Summit County (Park City), which, along with Salt Lake, was one of two counties in the state Hillary Clinton had carried in 2016 (and the only one where she had won a majority); and he flipped Grand County (Moab), which had voted Democratic in 1992 and 2008.

Per exit polls by the Associated Press, Trump's strength in Utah came from Mormons. 53% of voters identified as Mormons, and Trump received 72% of their votes. Trump also won the suburban areas, which make up 57% of the state, with 54% of the vote.

Utah was one of the seven states (along with Arkansas, Nevada, California, Florida, Illinois, and Hawaii) as well as the District of Columbia, in which Trump's share of the vote increased from 2016.

== Primary elections ==
=== Republican primary ===
The Republican primary was held on March 3, 2020. Utah politicians Jon Huntsman and Mitt Romney both declined to run against Trump.

2020 Utah Republican presidential primary
Candidate	Votes	%	Estimated delegates
Donald Trump (incumbent)	302,751	87.79%	40
Bill Weld	23,652	6.86%	0
Joe Walsh (withdrawn)	7,509	2.18%	0
Matthew John Matern	5,751	1.67%	0
Robert Ardini	3,971	1.15%	0
Bob Ely	1,218	0.35%	0
Total	344,852	100%	40

=== Democratic primary ===
The Democratic primary was held on March 3, 2020. Elizabeth Warren, Bernie Sanders, and former Vice President Joe Biden were among the major declared candidates.

2020 Utah Democratic presidential primary
Candidate	Votes	%	Delegates
Bernie Sanders	79,728	36.14	16 (Note: 13 delegates, if Warren's and Bloomberg's statewide delegates would have been calculated.)
Joe Biden	40,674	18.44	7 (Note: 6 delegates, if Warren's and Bloomberg's statewide delegates would have been calculated.)
Elizabeth Warren	35,727	16.20	3 (Note: 5 delegates, if Warren's and Bloomberg's statewide delegates would have been calculated.)
Michael Bloomberg	33,991	15.41	3 (Note: 5 delegates, if Warren's and Bloomberg's statewide delegates would have been calculated.)
Pete Buttigieg (withdrawn) (Note: Candidate withdrew shortly before the primary after all-mail voting had started.)	18,734	8.49	
Amy Klobuchar (withdrawn)	7,603	3.45	
Tulsi Gabbard	1,704	0.77	
Andrew Yang (withdrawn)	950	0.43	
Tom Steyer (withdrawn)	703	0.32	
Marianne Williamson (withdrawn)	220	0.10	
Julian Castro (withdrawn)	159	0.07	
Cory Booker (withdrawn)	138	0.06	
Deval Patrick (withdrawn)	55	0.02	
Other candidates	196	0.09	
Total	220,582	100%	29

== General election ==
=== Predictions ===
Source	Ranking	As of
The Cook Political Report	Likely R	November 3, 2020
Inside Elections	Likely R	November 3, 2020
Sabato's Crystal Ball	Likely R	November 3, 2020
Politico	Likely R	November 3, 2020
RCP	Likely R	November 3, 2020
Niskanen	Safe R	November 3, 2020
CNN	Safe R	November 3, 2020
The Economist	Safe R	November 3, 2020
CBS News	Likely R	November 3, 2020
270towin	Likely R	November 3, 2020
ABC News	Safe R	November 3, 2020
NPR	Likely R	November 3, 2020
NBC News	Likely R	November 3, 2020
538	Safe R	November 3, 2020

=== Polling ===
==== Graphical summary ====
View source data.

==== Aggregate polls ====
Source of poll aggregation	Dates administered	Dates updated	Joe Biden Democratic	Donald Trump Republican	Other/ Undecided (Note: Calculated by taking the difference of 100% and all other candidates combined.)	Margin
270 to Win	October 23–31, 2020	November 3, 2020	41.0%	50.5%	8.5%	Trump +9.5
FiveThirtyEight	until November 2, 2020	November 3, 2020	42.1%	51.9%	6.0%	Trump +9.8
Average			41.6%	51.2%	7.2%	Trump +9.6

==== Polls ====
Poll source	Date(s) administered	Sample size (Note: Key: A – all adults RV – registered voters LV – likely voters V – unclear)	Margin of error	Donald Trump Republican	Joe Biden Democratic	Jo Jorgensen Libertarian	Howie Hawkins Green	Other	Undecided
SurveyMonkey/Axios	Oct 20 – Nov 2, 2020	1,586 (LV)	± 3.5%	55% (Note: Overlapping sample with the previous SurveyMonkey/Axios poll, but more information available regarding sample size)	43%	–	–	–	–
SurveyMonkey/Axios	Oct 1–28, 2020	2,783 (LV)	–	55%	43%	–	–	–	–
Y2 Analytics/Salt Lake Tribune	Oct 15–24, 2020	660 (LV)	± 3.8%	51%	44%	–	–	5% (Note: "Someone else" with 5%)	–
RMG Research/Deseret News/Hinckley Institute of Politics	Oct 12–17, 2020	1,000 (LV)	± 3.1%	50%	38%	3%	0%	1%	7%
Y2 Analytics/Salt Lake Tribune	Sep 26 – Oct 4, 2020	1,214 (LV)	± 2.8%	50%	40%	–	–	10%	1%
SurveyMonkey/Axios	Sep 1–30, 2020	1,192 (LV)	–	56%	42%	–	–	–	2%
RMG Research/Deseret News/Hinckley Institute of Politics	Sep 7–12, 2020	1,000 (LV)	± 3.1%	53%	35%	5%	0%	1%	6%
SurveyMonkey/Axios	Aug 1–31, 2020	893 (LV)	–	57%	41%	–	–	–	2%
RMG Research/Scott Rasmussen/Deseret News	Jul 27 – Aug 1, 2020	1,000 (RV)	± 3.1%	50%	31%	3%	1%	4%	11%
SurveyMonkey/Axios	Jul 1–31, 2020	1,037 (LV)	–	58%	40%	–	–	–	2%
SurveyMonkey/Axios	Jun 8–30, 2020	412 (LV)	–	57%	41%	–	–	–	1%
Y2 Analytics/UtahPolicy.com/KUTV 2	May 9–15, 2020	1,099 (LV)	± 3%	44%	41%	–	–	9% (Note: "Third party candidate" with 8%; "other" with 1%)	5%
Scott Rasmussen/Deseret News	Apr 15–21, 2020	964 (RV)	± 3.2%	51%	32%	–	–	8%	9%
Y2 Analytics	Mar 21–30, 2020	1,266 (RV)	± 2.8%	46%	41%	–	–	7%	5%
Scott Rasmussen/Deseret News	Feb 24 – Mar 1, 2020	1,000 (RV)	± 3.1%	50%	33%	–	–	8% (Note: Other with 5%; would not vote with 3%)	8%
Scott Rasmussen/Deseret News	Jan 15–22, 2020	1,017 (RV)	± 3.1%	49%	31%	–	–	13% (Note: Other with 9%; would not vote with 4%)	7%
Y2 Analytics	Jul 31 – Aug 6, 2019	149 (RV)	–	36%	35%	–	–	14% (Note: "A third-party candidate" with 10%; other with 4%)	5%

Former candidates

with Donald Trump and Michael Bloomberg

Poll source	Date(s) administered	Sample size	Margin of error	Donald Trump (R)	Michael Bloomberg (D)	Other	Undecided
Scott Rasmussen/Deseret News	Jan 15–22, 2020	1,017 (RV)	± 3.1%	45%	32%	11% (Note: Other with 8%; would not vote with 3%)	13%

with Donald Trump and Cory Booker

Poll source	Date(s) administered	Sample size	Margin of error	Donald Trump (R)	Cory Booker (D)	Other	Undecided
Y2 Analytics	Jul 31 – Aug 6, 2019	153 (RV)	–	31%	43%	23% (Note: "A third-party candidate" with 16%; other with 7%)	3%

with Donald Trump and Pete Buttigieg

Poll source	Date(s) administered	Sample size	Margin of error	Donald Trump (R)	Pete Buttigieg (D)	Other	Undecided
Scott Rasmussen/Deseret News	Jan 15–22, 2020	1,017 (RV)	± 3.1%	48%	25%	13%	14%
Y2 Analytics	Jul 31 – Aug 6, 2019	144 (RV)	–	48%	28%	15% (Note: "A third-party candidate" with 12%; other with 3%)	9%

with Donald Trump and Kamala Harris

Poll source	Date(s) administered	Sample size	Margin of error	Donald Trump (R)	Kamala Harris (D)	Other	Undecided
Y2 Analytics	Jul 31 – Aug 6, 2019	144 (RV)	–	48%	33%	15% (Note: "A third-party candidate" with 13%; other with 2%)	5%

with Donald Trump and Amy Klobuchar

Poll source	Date(s) administered	Sample size	Margin of error	Donald Trump (R)	Amy Klobuchar (D)	Other	Undecided
Scott Rasmussen/Deseret News	Jan 15–22, 2020	1,017 (RV)	± 3.1%	49%	23%	14% (Note: Other with 10%; would not vote with 4%)	14%

with Donald Trump and Beto O'Rourke

Poll source	Date(s) administered	Sample size	Margin of error	Donald Trump (R)	Beto O'Rourke (D)	Other	Undecided
Y2 Analytics	Jul 31 – Aug 6, 2019	140 (RV)	–	41%	27%	25% (Note: "A third-party candidate" with 20%; other with 5%)	7%

with Donald Trump and Bernie Sanders

Poll source	Date(s) administered	Sample size	Margin of error	Donald Trump (R)	Bernie Sanders (D)	Other	Undecided
Scott Rasmussen/Deseret News	Feb 24 – Mar 1, 2020	1,000 (RV)	± 3.1%	50%	33%	9% (Note: Other with 6%; would not vote with 3%)	7%
Scott Rasmussen/Deseret News	Jan 15–22, 2020	1,017 (RV)	± 3.1%	50%	31%	13% (Note: Other with 10%; would not vote with 3%)	6%
Y2 Analytics	Jul 31 – Aug 6, 2019	153 (RV)	–	38%	44%	14%	5%

with Donald Trump and Elizabeth Warren

Poll source	Date(s) administered	Sample size	Margin of error	Donald Trump (R)	Elizabeth Warren (D)	Other	Undecided
Scott Rasmussen/Deseret News	Feb 24 – Mar 1, 2020	1,000 (RV)	± 3.1%	50%	28%	12% (Note: Other with 9%; would not vote with 3%)	10%
Scott Rasmussen/Deseret News	Jan 15–22, 2020	1,017 (RV)	± 3.1%	50%	28%	12%	10%
Y2 Analytics	Jul 31 – Aug 6, 2019	144 (RV)	–	39%	36%	19% (Note: "A third-party candidate" with 15%; other with 4%)	6%

Hypothetical polling

with Donald Trump and Generic Democrat

Poll source	Date(s) administered	Sample size	Margin of error	Donald Trump (R)	Generic Democrat	Other	Undecided
Y2 Analytics/UtahPolicy/KUTV 2 News	Jan 16–30, 2020	2,174 (LV)	–	47%	31%	12% (Note: "Third party candidate" with 8%; "other" with 4%)	10%
Y2 Analytics/UtahPolicy/KUTV 2 News	Sep 25 – Oct 8, 2019	944 (LV)	–	41%	33%	16% (Note: "Third party candidate" with 12%; "other" with 4%)	10%
Y2 Analytics/UtahPolicy/KUTV 2 News	Jun 27 – Jul 17, 2019	2,464 (LV)	–	38%	30%	18% (Note: "Third party candidate" with 12%; "other" with 6%)	14%

with Donald Trump and Generic Opponent

Poll source	Date(s) administered	Sample size	Margin of error	Donald Trump (R)	Generic Opponent	Undecided
Dan Jones & Associates/Salt Lake Chamber of Commerce	Feb 28 – Mar 11, 2020	798 (LV)	± 3.47%	52%	45% (Note: Listed as "Time to give someone new a chance to serve" (as opposed to "should be re-elected"))	3%
Dan Jones & Associates/Salt Lake Chamber of Commerce	Oct 3–10, 2019	600 (LV)	± 4%	50%	46%	4%
Dan Jones & Associates/Salt Lake Chamber of Commerce	Jun 11 – Jul 1, 2019	801 (LV)	–	45%	52%	4%

=== Results ===
2020 United States presidential election in Utah
Party	Candidate	Votes	%	±%
Republican	Donald Trump Mike Pence	865,140	58.13%	+12.59%
Democratic	Joe Biden Kamala Harris	560,282	37.65%	+10.19%
Libertarian	Jo Jorgensen Spike Cohen	38,447	2.58%	−0.92%
Independent	Kanye West Michelle Tidball	7,213	0.48%	−
Constitution	Don Blankenship William Mohr	5,551	0.37%	−0.34%
Green	Howie Hawkins Angela Walker	5,053	0.34%	−0.49%
Independent	Brock Pierce Karla Ballard	2,623	0.18%	−
Independent	Joe McHugh Elizabeth Storm	2,229	0.15%	−
Socialism and Liberation	Gloria La Riva Sunil Freeman	1,139	0.08%	−
Write-in		612	0.04%	-0.38%
Total votes		1,488,289	100.00%	N/A

==== By county ====
County	Donald Trump Republican		Joe Biden Democratic		Various candidates Other parties		Margin		Total
County	#	%	#	%	#	%	#	%	Total
Beaver	2,695	86.94%	357	11.52%	48	1.55%	2,338	75.42%	3,100
Box Elder	21,548	79.73%	4,473	16.55%	1,006	3.72%	17,075	63.18%	27,027
Cache	38,032	66.06%	16,650	28.92%	2,889	5.02%	21,382	37.14%	57,571
Carbon	6,693	71.44%	2,392	25.53%	284	3.03%	4,301	45.91%	9,369
Daggett	496	80.13%	111	17.93%	12	1.94%	385	62.20%	619
Davis	104,135	61.29%	57,411	33.79%	8,349	4.91%	46,724	27.50%	169,895
Duchesne	7,513	88.14%	843	9.89%	168	1.97%	6,670	78.25%	8,524
Emery	4,207	86.47%	572	11.76%	86	1.77%	3,635	74.72%	4,865
Garfield	2,158	78.99%	514	18.81%	60	2.20%	1,644	60.18%	2,732
Grand	2,248	43.36%	2,806	54.12%	131	2.53%	-558	-10.76%	5,185
Iron	18,989	76.29%	4,892	19.65%	1,009	4.05%	14,097	56.64%	24,890
Juab	5,087	86.72%	645	11.00%	134	2.28%	4,442	75.72%	5,866
Kane	2,998	71.72%	1,083	25.91%	99	2.37%	1,915	45.81%	4,180
Millard	5,404	87.73%	624	10.13%	132	2.14%	4,780	77.60%	6,160
Morgan	5,181	79.56%	1,086	16.68%	245	3.76%	4,095	62.88%	6,512
Piute	773	88.75%	86	9.87%	12	1.38%	687	78.87%	871
Rich	1,157	84.89%	180	13.21%	26	1.91%	977	71.68%	1,363
Salt Lake	230,174	42.53%	289,906	53.57%	21,095	3.90%	-59,732	-11.04%	541,175
San Juan	3,535	51.40%	3,113	45.26%	230	3.34%	422	6.14%	6,878
Sanpete	10,459	82.80%	1,794	14.20%	378	2.99%	8,665	68.60%	12,631
Sevier	9,052	87.35%	1,084	10.46%	227	2.19%	7,968	76.89%	10,363
Summit	10,252	39.30%	15,244	58.43%	592	2.27%	-4,992	-19.14%	26,088
Tooele	21,014	66.67%	8,943	28.37%	1,561	4.95%	12,071	38.30%	31,518
Uintah	13,261	86.63%	1,663	10.86%	383	2.50%	11,598	75.77%	15,307
Utah	192,812	67.78%	76,033	26.73%	15,635	5.50%	116,779	41.05%	284,480
Wasatch	10,795	61.40%	6,187	35.19%	599	3.41%	4,608	26.21%	17,581
Washington	67,294	74.38%	20,530	22.69%	2,652	2.93%	46,764	51.69%	90,476
Wayne	1,229	75.82%	365	22.52%	27	1.67%	864	53.30%	1,621
Weber	65,949	59.18%	40,695	36.52%	4,798	4.31%	25,254	22.66%	111,442
Totals	865,140	58.13%	560,282	37.65%	62,867	4.22%	304,858	20.48%	1,488,289

Counties that flipped from Republican to Democratic

- Grand (largest municipality: Moab)

==== By congressional district ====
Trump won all four congressional districts.

District	Trump	Biden	Representative
1st	64.2%	31.6%	Rob Bishop
1st	64.2%	31.6%	Blake Moore
2nd	56.1%	40.2%	Chris Stewart
3rd	60.3%	35.2%	John Curtis
4th	52.4%	43.3%	Ben McAdams
4th	52.4%	43.3%	Burgess Owens

== See also ==
- United States presidential elections in Utah
- Presidency of Joe Biden
- 2020 United States presidential election
- 2020 Democratic Party presidential primaries
- 2020 Republican Party presidential primaries
- 2020 United States elections
