= Rasmussen Reports =

American opinion polling company

Rasmussen Reports, LLC
- Founded: 2003
- Founder: Scott Rasmussen
- Headquarters: Asbury Park, New Jersey, United States
- Key people: Ted Carroll (Noson Lawen Partners); Fran Coombs (managing editor); Amy Holmes (spokeswoman)
- Products: Political commentary, opinion polling
- Owner: Noson Lawen Partners (majority investor)
- Website: www.rasmussenreports.com

Rasmussen Reports /ˈræsˌmʌsən/ is an American polling company founded in 2003. The company engages in political commentary and the collection, publication, and distribution of public opinion polling information. Rasmussen Reports conducts nightly tracking, at national and state levels, of elections, politics, current events, consumer confidence, business topics, and the United States president's job approval ratings. Surveys by the company are conducted using a combination of automated public opinion polling involving pre-recorded telephone inquiries and an online survey. The company generates revenue by selling advertising and subscriptions to its polling survey data.

Rasmussen has been questioned for its methodology and for an apparent bias toward the Republican Party. In 2024, 538 dropped Rasmussen from its polling averages and analysis, saying Rasmussen failed to meet 538's standards for pollsters.

== History ==
Rasmussen Reports was founded in 2003 by Scott Rasmussen, who served as the company's president from its founding until July 2013, when he left to found the digital media company Styrk.

Rasmussen founded his first polling company in 1994. That company, Rasmussen Research, was bought by TownPagesNet.com for about $4.5 million in ordinary shares in 1999. Starting in 1999, Rasmussen's poll was called Portrait of America. In 2003, Rasmussen founded Rasmussen Reports, based in Asbury Park, New Jersey. In August 2009, The Washington Post reported that Rasmussen Reports had received a “major growth capital investment.” New Jersey Business magazine reported that the company increased the size of its staff later that year.

== Business model and methodology ==
Rasmussen Reports engages in the collection, publication, and distribution of public opinion polling information, tracking the political world, current events, consumer confidence, business topics, and the president's job approval ratings. Rasmussen Reports also conducts nightly national tracking polls and scheduled state surveys. The company provides commentary and political analysis through a daily email newsletter. In September 2012, Rasmussen Reports and Telco Productions launched a nationally syndicated television show called What America Thinks With Scott Rasmussen.

For surveys such as its daily Presidential Tracking Poll, Rasmussen's automated technology calls randomly selected phone numbers, ensuring geographic representation. Surveys can be targeted towards American adults or towards likely voters, which are determined through screening questions. In polling conducted as of 2010, Rasmussen utilized landline-only polling without attempting callbacks. In these polls, Rasmussen also did not conduct within-household selection methods, instead relying on weighting to compensate for the sample. To reach those who have abandoned landlines, Rasmussen has utilized online survey tool interviews with randomly selected participants from a demographically diverse panel. Rasmussen's automated surveys are conducted by Pulse Opinion Research, a firm that licensed methodology developed by Scott Rasmussen. Polling data is weighted by adjusting for demographic variables, including age, gender, political affiliation, and race.

Rasmussen Reports generates revenue by selling advertising and subscriptions.

According to Nate Silver in 2010, automated polling methods like Rasmussen's have been found to be more favorable towards Republicans when compared to polls conducted with traditional methods involving live interviewers. FiveThirtyEight gave Rasmussen a C+ rating before excluding Rasmussen from its poll tracking. Rasmussen is not a member of the National Council on Public Polls or a supporter of the American Association for Public Opinion Research's Transparency Initiative.

== Polling topics ==
=== Political sentiment ===
==== Presidential approval tracking ====
Rasmussen Reports conducts a daily Presidential Tracking Poll which measures the president's job approval rating. Rasmussen Reports notes that, "It is important to remember that the Rasmussen Reports job approval ratings are based upon a sample of likely voters. Some other firms base their approval ratings on samples of all adults. Obama's numbers were almost always several points higher in a poll of adults rather than likely voters. That's because some of the former president's most enthusiastic supporters, such as young adults, are less likely to turn out to vote." Newsweek also notes that polls of all adults produce results that are more favorable to Democrats than do polls of likely voters. Mark Blumenthal of Pollster.com notes that, "Rasmussen's Obama job approval ratings do tend to be lower than most other polls, but they are not the lowest."

In March 2009, a Rasmussen Reports poll was the first to show President Barack Obama's approval rating falling. Writing in The Wall Street Journal, Scott Rasmussen, along with President Clinton's pollster, Douglas Schoen, said, "Polling data show that Mr. Obama's approval rating is dropping and is below where George W. Bush was in an analogous period in 2001. Rasmussen Reports data shows that Mr. Obama's net presidential approval rating—which is calculated by subtracting the number who strongly disapprove from the number who strongly approve—is just six, his lowest rating to date."

The Rasmussen polls are often viewed as outliers due to their favorable Donald Trump approval ratings.

==== Generic Congressional Ballot ====
Each week, Rasmussen Reports updates a Generic Congressional Ballot Poll. The poll tracks what percentage of likely voters would vote for the Republican in their district’s congressional race if the election were held today, and what percentage of likely voters would choose the Democrat instead. In 2009, Rasmussen Reports produced the first poll that showed Democrats trailing on the Generic Congressional Ballot for the 2010 midterm elections.

==== Healthcare reform ====
Starting in 2009, Rasmussen Reports tracked attitudes about health care reform legislation on a weekly basis. Since the Patient Protection and Affordable Care Act became law in March 2010, Rasmussen Reports consistently measured double-digit support for repeal of the law in 100 polls taken from March 2010 to July 2012. Likely voters favored repeal by an average margin of 16 percentage points during that period.

==== Political Class/Mainstream Index ====
Rasmussen Reports tracks the gap between what it labels "Mainstream Voters" and the "Political Class." According to the Wall Street Journal, "To figure out where people are, he [Rasmussen] asks three questions: Whose judgment do you trust more: that of the American people or America's political leaders? Has the federal government become its own special interest group? Do government and big business often work together in ways that hurt consumers and investors? Those who identify with the government on two or more questions are defined as the political class."

==== Other ====
Rasmussen Reports conducts a weekly tracking poll that asks voters whether they think the country is heading in the right direction or is on the wrong track. The company also provides regular updates on topics including global warming and energy issues, housing, the war on terror, the mood of America, Congress and the Supreme Court, importance of issues, partisan trust, and trends in public opinion. In 2007, Tony Snow, White House press secretary for President George W. Bush, attacked a Rasmussen poll that showed only 19% of Americans believed the Iraq War troop surge of 2007 was a success.

David Weigel wrote that, "where Rasmussen Reports really distinguishes itself, and the reason it’s so often cited by conservatives, is in its issue polling. Before the stimulus debate began, Rasmussen asked voters whether they’d favor stimulus plans that consisted entirely of tax cuts or entirely of spending. Tax cuts won every time, and Republicans began citing this when they argued for a tax-cut-only stimulus package."

In May 2012, a Rasmussen Reports poll found that "a solid majority of voters nationwide favor legalizing and regulating marijuana similar to the way alcohol and tobacco cigarettes are currently regulated.” Of those polled, 56% favored legalizing and regulating marijuana, while 36% were opposed to legalizing and regulating the drug.

In July 2012, a Rasmussen Reports poll found that over two-thirds of Americans would fire every member of Congress. In January 2013, a Rasmussen Reports poll found record low levels of support for the Tea Party movement. Of those polled, 30% held a favorable view of the Tea Party, 49% held an unfavorable view, and only 8% identified as a part of the group.

=== Elections ===
==== Presidential ====
===== 2000 =====
In the 2000 presidential election, Scott Rasmussen polled under the name Portrait of America, a predecessor to Rasmussen Reports. The Portrait of America prediction for the 2000 presidential election was off by 4.5%, compared to the average 1.1% margin of error most other national polls gave at the time. (Rasmussen's automated telephone poll had Gore beating Bush 49-40 in the national popular vote. Gore and Bush both received approximately 48% of the actual popular vote.)

===== 2004 =====
In the 2004 presidential election, "Rasmussen...beat most of their human competitors in the battleground states, often by large margins," according to Slate magazine. Rasmussen projected the 2004 presidential results within one percentage point of the actual vote totals earned by both George W. Bush and John Kerry.

===== 2008 =====
According to Politico, "Rasmussen's final poll of the 2008 general election—showing Obama defeating Arizona Sen. John McCain 52 percent to 46 percent—closely mirrored the election's outcome." In reference to the 2008 presidential election, a Talking Points Memo article said, "Rasmussen's final polls had Obama ahead 52–46%, which was nearly identical to Obama's final margin of 53–46%, and made him one of the most accurate pollsters out there." An analysis by Costas Panagopoulos in 2009 ranked 23 survey research organizations on the accuracy of their final, national pre-election polls based upon Obama's 7.2% margin of victory; the analysis determined that Rasmussen Reports was tied for 9th-most accurate. Democracy Corps, Fox News/Opinion Dynamic, CNN/Opinion Research, and Ipsos/McClatchy all predicted an accurate seven-point spread.

Rasmussen Reports polls predicted the correct winner in 46 states. Its final polls of Florida, Indiana and North Carolina all showed leads for McCain. Obama went on to win all three of these states. Rasmussen's poll of Ohio on November 2, 2008, showed a tied race there. Obama went on to win the state by 4 percentage points.

===== 2012 =====
The final 2012 Electoral College projection by Rasmussen Reports showed 237 safe electoral votes for Barack Obama, 206 safe electoral votes for Mitt Romney, and eight toss-up states with a total of 95 electoral votes. The final Rasmussen Reports daily tracking poll showed Mitt Romney with a 49–48% lead over President Obama. Obama won the election by close to 4 percentage points. Rasmussen Reports predicted Obama winning Nevada and New Hampshire, tying Romney in Ohio and Wisconsin, and losing in the other five swing states, including North Carolina. Obama won in the swing states of Ohio, Wisconsin, Colorado, Florida, Iowa, and Virginia, while Romney took North Carolina.

A Fordham University study by Dr. Costas Panagopoulos compared pre-election polling with the results from election day. The study ranked Rasmussen Reports 24th out of 28 polls in accuracy, one slot above Gallup. An analysis by Nate Silver on FiveThirtyEight ranked Rasmussen 20th out of 23 pollsters for accuracy in the 2012 elections, with an average error of 4.2 points. After the election, James Rainey of the Los Angeles Times wrote that "Some conservative media outlets used the Rasmussen polling to prop up a narrative in the final days of the campaign that Romney had momentum and a good chance of winning the White House."

On November 7, Scott Rasmussen told Slate's David Weigel, "In general, the projections were pretty good. The two differences I noted were share of white vote falling to 72 percent. That's what the Obama campaign, to their credit, said all along. We showed it just over 73 percent. Also, youth turnout higher and senior turnout lower than expected. That’s a pretty big deal given the size of the generation gap. I think it showed clearly that the Obama team had a great game plan for identifying their vote and getting it to the polls."

On November 8, Rasmussen Reports stated that "The 2012 election was very likely the last presidential election of the telephone polling era. While the industry did an excellent job of projecting the results, entirely new techniques will need to be developed before 2016. The central issue is that phone polling worked for decades because that was how people communicated. In the 21st century, that is no longer true."

===== 2016 =====
Rasmussen Reports’ final White House Watch survey showed Democrat Hillary Clinton with a 1.7% popular-vote lead over Republican Donald Trump. After all 136+ million U.S. votes were counted, Clinton led the popular vote by 2.1% in her loss to Trump. As in 2012, a Fordham University study by Dr. Panagopoulos compared pre-election polling with the results from election day. The study ranked 14 organizations but, unlike 2012, chose to omit the results of Rasmussen Reports.

===== 2020 =====
For the 2020 United States presidential election, Rasmussen Reports' final White House Watch survey of likely U.S. voters showed Democrat Joe Biden with a 1% lead over Republican Donald Trump, stating that "President Trump and Democrat Joe Biden are in a near tie." Ultimately, Biden won the election by 4.5 percentage points. FiveThirtyEight found that Rasmussen was the third most accurate pollster of the 2020 presidential election, with an average error of 2.8 points for polls taken in the final 21 days before the election.

After Trump lost the election, Rasmussen suggested that Vice President Mike Pence should overturn the election results.

===== 2024 =====
For the 2024 United States presidential election, Rasmussen Reports' final national poll put Trump with a 3-point lead over Kamala Harris, despite most pollsters predicting a tight race. Trump ultimately led the popular vote by a margin of about 1.5%, or around 2.3 million votes.

==== Congressional and gubernatorial ====
In the 2009 New Jersey gubernatorial race, Rasmussen Reports' final poll predicted that Chris Christie would beat Jon Corzine by a margin of 3 points. Christie won the race with a spread of 4.3 points. In December 2009, Alan Abramowitz wrote that if Rasmussen's data was accurate, Republicans would gain 62 seats in the House during the 2010 midterm elections. In a column written the week before the 2010 midterm elections, Rasmussen stated his belief that Republicans would gain at least 55 seats in the House and end up with 48 or 49 Senate seats. Republicans ended up gaining 63 seats in the House, and coming away with 47 Senate seats.

In 2010, Rasmussen Reports was the first to show Republican Scott Brown had a chance to defeat Martha Coakley in the Massachusetts Senate race. Just after Brown's upset win, Ben Smith at Politico reported, "The overwhelming conventional wisdom in both parties until a Rasmussen poll showed the race in single digits in early January was that Martha Coakley was a lock. (It's hard to recall a single poll changing the mood of a race quite that dramatically.)" A study by Boston University and the Pew Research Center's Project for Excellence in Journalism about how the Massachusetts Senate race was covered in the media concluded that "a Rasmussen Report's [sic] poll that showed the overwhelming Republican underdog, Scott Brown, climbing to within single digits (nine points) of Martha Coakley. That poll, perhaps more than anything else, signaled that a possible upset was brewing and galvanized both the media and political worlds." The New York Times Magazine opened a March 14 cover story with a scene highlighting the impact of that poll in an internal White House meeting involving President Obama's chief of staff Rahm Emanuel. However, Rasmussen's polls all showed Coakley with the lead, including the final poll showing Coakley with a two-point lead, when she in fact lost by five points.

According to Nate Silver's assessment of 2010 pollster accuracy, the 105 polls released in senatorial and gubernatorial races by Rasmussen/Pulse Opinion Research missed the final margin between the candidates by 5.8 points. Nate Silver described Rasmussen as "biased and inaccurate", saying Rasmussen "badly missed the margin in many states, and also exhibited a considerable bias toward Republican candidates."

===== 2018 =====
In 2018, Rasmussen Reports predicted that Republicans would win the generic ballot by 1 percentage point while the actual election results had Democrats winning by nearly 9 percentage points. This error of nearly 10 percentage points was the largest polling error out of major firms who polled the national generic ballot. Rasmussen pushed back against critics after their miss, saying "the midterm result was relatively poor for Democrats compared to other midterms".

====== 2022 ======
Four months after the 2022 election for Arizona governor – which Kari Lake lost and unsuccessfully attempted to overturn in court – Rasmussen said there had been a 92% voter turnout rate and an 8-point victory for Lake. They based this conclusion on polling 1,001 people in Arizona. Mark Mitchell, Rasmussen Reports’ lead pollster, said on Steve Bannon's show that the poll suggested election "irregularities and cheating".

=== Business ===
In the business realm, Rasmussen Reports releases daily updates of Consumer and Investor Confidence with daily tracking back to 2002. The broad trends are similar to measures produced by the Conference Board and University of Michigan, but Rasmussen is the only consumer confidence measure updated daily. The firm also releases a monthly Rasmussen Employment Index, a U.S. Consumer Spending Index, Small Business Watch, and a Financial Security Index.

== Political commentary ==
In addition to polling, Rasmussen Reports publishes political commentary on its website.

Founder Scott Rasmussen is the author of the book In Search of Self-Governance and was a featured guest on a cruise by the conservative media outlet National Review.

== Evaluations of accuracy and performance ==
The accuracy of Rasmussen's polling has varied considerably in recent U.S. presidential elections (2000–2016). Some poll watchers, including Patrick Caddell, have lauded Rasmussen Reports, while others, such as Chris Cillizza, have questioned its accuracy. FiveThirtyEight gave the firm an overall rating of "B", reporting it had a 1.5-point bias in favor of the Republican Party.

For the 2020 United States presidential election, Rasmussen Reports' final White House Watch survey of likely U.S. voters showed Democrat Joe Biden with a 1% lead over Republican Donald Trump, stating that "President Trump and Democrat Joe Biden are in a near tie." Ultimately, Biden won the election by 4.5 percentage points. In 2018, Rasmussen Reports predicted that Republicans would win the generic ballot by 1 percentage point while the actual election results had Democrats winning by nearly 9 percentage points. This error of nearly 10 percentage points was the largest polling error out of major firms who polled the national generic ballot. Rasmussen pushed back against critics after their miss, saying "the midterm result was relatively poor for Democrats compared to other midterms".

=== Favorable ===
Caddel and Doug Schoen wrote in 2010 that Rasmussen has an "unchallenged record for both integrity and accuracy". In 2004 Slate "publicly doubted and privately derided" Rasmussen's use of recorded voices in electoral polls. However, after the election, they concluded that Rasmussen’s polls were among the most accurate in the 2004 presidential election. According to Politico, Rasmussen's 2008 presidential-election polls "closely mirrored the election's outcome".

At the end of the 2008 presidential election, there were eight national tracking polls and many other polls conducted on a regular basis. Polling analyst Nate Silver reviewed the tracking polls and said that while none were perfect, and Rasmussen was "frequently reputed to have a Republican lean", the "house effect" in their tracking poll was small and "with its large sample size and high pollster rating [it] would probably be the one I'd want with me on a desert island"; however, in 2010 Silver concluded Rasmussen was the least accurate of the major pollsters which he attributed to the "house effect" of Rasmussen's polling methodology.

=== Criticism ===
==== FiveThirtyEight ====
In 2010, Nate Silver wrote an article titled "Is Rasmussen Reports biased?" in which he mostly defended Rasmussen from allegations of bias. However, later in the year, Rasmussen's polling results diverged notably from those of other mainstream pollsters, which Silver labeled a "house effect", Silver's term for bias in polls that correlates with the organization doing the polling. He went on to explore other factors that may have explained the effect, such as the use of a likely voter model, and said that Rasmussen conducted its polls in a way that excluded the majority of the population from answering.

After the 2010 midterm elections, Silver concluded that Rasmussen's polls were the least accurate of the major pollsters in 2010, having an average error of 5.8 points and a pro-Republican bias of 3.9 points according to Silver's model.

In 2024, after Silver was replaced by G. Elliott Morris, Rasmussen was dropped entirely from FiveThirtyEight's polling averages and analysis. A spokesperson said that Rasmussen failed to meet FiveThirtyEight's recently updated standards for pollsters.

==== Bias in questions ====
Jonathan Chait of the New Republic said that Rasmussen is perceived in the "conservative world" as "the gold standard" and suggested the polling company asks the questions specifically to show public support for the conservative position. He cited an example in which Rasmussen asked "Should the government set limits on how much salt Americans can eat?" when the issue was actually whether to limit the amount of salt only in pre-processed food.

Rasmussen Reports has frequently claimed that COVID-19 vaccines are lethal, promoted election denialism, stated that a poll held 4 months after the 2020 United States Senate elections was representative of the results on the election day, merged 3 topics into the same question, released the results 11 months later and claimed that the outcome of the poll was representative of COVID-19 vaccines' supposed mortality rate.

Alt-right conspiracy theorist Jack Posobiec sponsored Rasmussen's tracking poll twice in 2020 and 33 times in 2021.

==== Other ====
The Center for Public Integrity listed "Scott Rasmussen Inc" as a paid consultant for the 2004 George W. Bush campaign. The Washington Post reported that the 2004 Bush re-election campaign had used a feature on the Rasmussen Reports website that allowed customers to program their own polls, and that Rasmussen asserted that he had not written any of the questions nor assisted Republicans.

In 2009 Time magazine described Rasmussen Reports as a "conservative-leaning polling group". John Zogby said in 2010 that Scott Rasmussen had a "conservative constituency". In 2012 The Washington Post called Rasmussen a "polarizing pollster".

Rasmussen has received criticism over the wording in its polls. Asking a polling question with different wording can affect the results of the poll; the commentators in question allege that the questions Rasmussen ask in polls are skewed in order to favor a specific response. For instance, when Rasmussen polled whether Republican voters thought Rush Limbaugh was the leader of their party, the specific question they asked was: "Agree or Disagree: 'Rush Limbaugh is the leader of the Republican Party—he says jump and they say how high.'"

Talking Points Memo has questioned the methodology of Rasmussen's Presidential Approval Index, which takes into account only those who "strongly" approve or disapprove of the President's job performance. TPM noted that this inherently skews negative, and reported that multiple polling experts were critical of the concept. A New York Times article says Rasmussen Reports research has a "record of relying on dubious sampling and weighting techniques". Rasmussen has also been criticized for only polling Likely Voters which, according to Politico, "potentially weeds out younger and minority voters".

A 2017 article by Chris Cillizza for CNN raised doubts about Rasmussen's accuracy, drawing attention specifically to potential sampling biases such as the exclusion of calls to cell phones (which, Cillizza argued, tended to exclude younger voters), and also more generally to a lack of methodological disclosure. Cillizza did, however, note in the same piece that Rasmussen was one of the more accurate polling organizations during the 2016 United States presidential election.

A December 2018 article by political writer and analyst Harry Enten called Rasmussen the least accurate pollster in the 2018 midterm elections after stating Rasmussen had projected the Republicans to come ahead nationally by one point, while at the time Democrats were actually winning the national House vote by 8.6 points—an error of nearly 10 points.

The Associated Press has also addressed Rasmussen's methodology. In 2018, AP journalists noted that Rasmussen's telephone methodology systematically omits adults, many of them young people, without landlines. The AP also noted that Rasmussen does not provide details regarding its online-panel methodology.

In an article for The Hill titled "Rasmussen Research has a pro-GOP bias", panelist discussed Rasmussen's practice of adjusting results by party identification. In addition to providing professional criticism from Ipsos, the article cited methodological concerns from Frank Newport of Gallup.

In 2024, The Washington Post's fact checker determined that Rasmussen had spread false information about the accuracy and reliability of Dominion Voting Systems's voting machines. American Muckrakers alleged that Rasmussen shared polling results with members of the Trump presidential campaign before public release.

Split Ticket also does not include Rasmussen in its polling averages.

== See also ==
- Trafalgar Group
