= Marta Acosta =

American novelist

- Education: Stanford University
- Occupations: Novelist, writer
- Writing career
- Pen name: Grace Coopersmith
- Language: English
- Genres: Fiction, chick-lit, urban fantasy, young adult literature
- Notable works: Casa Dracula series, The She-Hulk Diaries, The Shadow Girl Of Birch Grove
- Website: www.martaacosta.com

Marta Acosta is an American author of young adult, urban fantasy, and chick-lit fiction, known for her Casa Dracula series and for her 2013 book The She-Hulk Diaries. Acosta has also written under the pen name of Grace Coopersmith for her 2010 book Nancy's Theory of Style, which is based on a supporting character from her Casa Dracula series.

== Background ==
Acosta was born in Oakland, California. She has written for the San Francisco Chronicle and Contra Costa Times as a freelancer and attended Stanford University. She met with some difficulty when trying to publish her work, as some publishers wanted her to write more in the magical realism genre popularized by Isabelle Allende, and of comparisons to other Latino or Latina writers, Acosta has stated that "All these Latino writers come from a different background ... No matter what they write, it's going to get compared to Gabriel Marquez. But they're not comparing all Irish-Americans to James Joyce." In 2006 Acosta's Happy Hour at Casa Dracula was named one of Catalina magazine's "Top 5 Books by Latina Authors" for that year due to its characters and writing. In 2010 Acosta chose to publish her young adult novel The Shadow Girl Of Birch Grove for free online via Scribd. Acosta and her agent had previously sent the work out to various publishers, who had not shown any true interest in the work. After the work was published online the book became the top ranked YA book on the site and Acosta received a book deal through Tor Books.

== Awards ==
- Top 5 Books by Latina Authors by Catalina magazine (2006, won for Happy Hour at Casa Dracula)
- RT Reviewers' Choice Award for The Bride of Casa Dracula (2008, nominated)
- RT Reviewers' Choice Award for Haunted Honeymoon (2010, nominated)

== Bibliography ==
=== Casa Dracula ===
1. Happy Hour at Casa Dracula (2006)
2. Midnight Brunch (2007)
3. The Bride of Casa Dracula (2008)
4. Haunted Honeymoon (2010)

=== Young adult works ===
- The Shadow Girl of Birch Grove (2010)
- Dark Companion (2012)

=== Other works ===
- Nancy's Theory of Style (2010, as Grace Coopersmith)
- Wolfish in Sheep's Clothing (2011)
- The She-Hulk Diaries (2013)
- Make It Catchy: The Quintessential Guide to Writing Query Letters (2013)
- Girls Are Gone (2014)
