= Joseph Napolitan =

American political consultant

Joseph Napolitan (March 6, 1929 – December 2, 2013) was an American political consultant, who worked as a general consultant on over 100 political campaigns in the United States, and many others throughout the world. Napolitan served on the 1960 Kennedy for President campaign, was Director of Media for the 1968 Hubert Humphrey campaign, and received the French Legion of Honour in 2005. He died on December 2, 2013, at the age of 84.

Napolitan was credited with coining the term "political consultant" to describe political professionals who are hired out to provide advice to different political campaigns, often at the same time. Napolitan was the founder and first president of the American Association of Political Consultants. He co-founded the International Association of Political Consultants, with Frenchman Michel Bongrand. Napolitan was also CEO of Napolitan & Associates in Springfield, Massachusetts.

The Napolitan Institute, founded by pollster Scott Rasmussen, is named in honor of Napolitan.
