= Napolitan Institute =

American nonprofit organization

- Founded: 2024
- Founder: Scott Rasmussen
- Type: 501(c)(3)
- Products: Public opinion polling
- Website: napolitaninstitute.org

The Napolitan Institute is an American 501(c)(3) nonprofit organization. The organization conducts polling and analysis aimed at understanding American political sentiment. The organization's stated mission is to "lift up and amplify the voice of the American people so loudly that it cannot be ignored in the halls of power." Founded in 2024 by public opinion pollster Scott Rasmussen, the organization is named in honor of political consultant Joseph Napolitan. The Napolitan Institute publishes the results of its research through the Napolitan News Service.

In 2025, the Napolitan Institute and Google technology incubator Jigsaw announced their collaboration on an initiative surrounding the United States Semiquincentennial. The year long We The People initiative used artificial intelligence to engage five to ten individuals from every congressional district. Napolitan Institute founder Scott Rasmussen said the goal of the initiative was to uncover common ground among Americans. According to Forbes, the initiative sought to "answer questions about what it means to be an American, the most urgent issues facing the country, and where the nation might go from here." The We The People initiative was inspired by a polling project in Bowling Green, Kentucky, that gathered 7,000 statements and 1 million "agree" or "disagree" votes on those statements from city residents. The What Could BG Be initiative was called the largest town hall meeting in the United States.

In April 2026, Rasmussen presented the findings of the We The People initiative to the American Philosophical Society (APS). The APS was founded by Benjamin Franklin and serves as a museum next to Independence Hall in Philadelphia. The APS accepted the "Declaration of American Ideals" into its archives and is displaying it as part of its public collection in 2026 during the U.S. Semiquincentennial. Rasmussen said the findings show that "We are not a 50-50 polarized nation. What I believe we are is a 10-10-80 nation. There are people on both the left and the right who reject America's founding ideals… [but] 80% of Americans hate the political fighting."
