= Bill Rasmussen =

American director of television sports broadcasting (1932–2026)

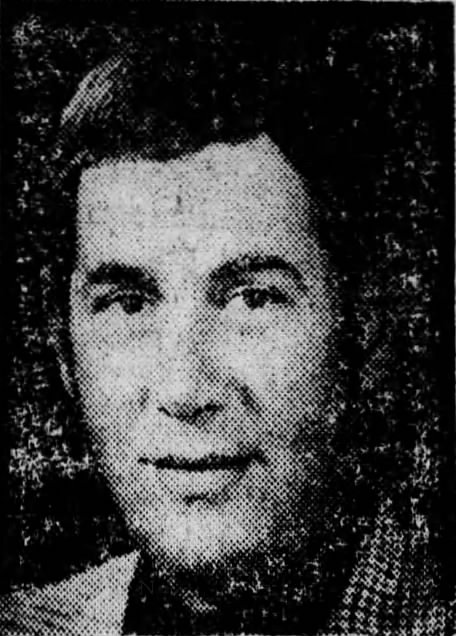
- Rasmussen in a 1974 newspaper
- Born: October 15, 1932; Chicago, Illinois, U.S.
- Died: August 18, 2026 (aged 93); Land O' Lakes, Florida, U.S.
- Education: Depauw University (BA); Rutgers University (MBA)
- Known for: Co-founder and president of ESPN/ESPN Inc.

William F. Rasmussen (October 15, 1932 – August 18, 2026) was an American director of television sports broadcasting who co-founded sports network ESPN with his son Scott Rasmussen and others. ESPN was founded on July 14, 1978, with Rasmussen as the first president and CEO, and launched on September 7, 1979.

== Early life, family and education ==
Rasmussen was born on October 15, 1932, in Chicago, Illinois, where he attended Gage Park High School. He played baseball (as third baseman) with the hopes of becoming a professional player, earning an invitation to a minor league affiliate of the Detroit Tigers.

Instead, he attended DePauw University in Indiana on an academic scholarship, where he met his future wife Lois. After college, he was a supply officer in the US Air Force. In 1960, he graduated from Rutgers University with an MBA. His son Scott was born in 1956, the year he was discharged from the military.

== Career ==
Rasmussen's career in the media began in western Massachusetts's Pioneer Valley, at radio station WTTT (1430 AM) in Amherst in 1963. In 1965, he moved south to Springfield, working for both of the city's television stations. First, he worked at WHYN (today's WGGB, channel 40), then WWLP (channel 22), where he spent eight years as a sports director, then two as a news director. In 1974, he moved south to Hartford, Connecticut, to join the New England Whalers of the World Hockey Association as their communications director. At the conclusion of the 1977–78 season, Rasmussen was fired by the Whalers.

=== ESPN ===
ESPN, originally called Entertainment and Sports Programming, was incorporated on July 14, 1978. It began broadcasting fourteen months later, at 7 p.m. on September 7, 1979. ESPN wound up being headquartered in Bristol, Connecticut. Rasmussen paid $18,000 for the first acre of ESPN's campus.

Getty Oil purchased 85% of ESPN and left 15% of the enterprise to be split.

By July 18, 1979, before launch, the investors decided to remove Rasmussen from power. His salary and responsibilities were cut.

According to the book Those Guys Have All the Fun: Inside the World of ESPN just prior to the launch, Stuart Evey (credited with helping to launch ESPN) claimed, "I made Bill Chairman, but in no way did I want to give him any responsibility!" "Having Bill Rasmussen play a significant role was just not part of the deal." Rasmussen, the one who had the idea for ESPN, stepped back from day-to-day business, having less contact with ESPN until mid 1999. Rasmussen and ESPN "made amends" in 1999 when then-president George Bodenheimer reached out to the founder for the network's 20th anniversary.

On September 30, 1980, ESPN officials announced that Bill Rasmussen was leaving the company by agreement.

The New York Times reported in 1984 that ABC had purchased controlling interest in ESPN by buying out Getty Oil's position. At the time of the Getty Oil buyout, ABC in turn bought out the Rasmussen family's 15% stake for $6,000,000. Rasmussen had to split the $6,000,000 with numerous other investors and funders such as his brother Don Rasmussen, with Bill Rasmussen ending up with an estimated $1.2 million and a little over $740,000 after taxes.

George Bodenheimer, then president of ESPN, recognized Rasmussen in October 2005 and dedicated a plaque and flagpole in his honor.

In April 2026, ESPN premiered a documentary, Sports Heaven: The Birth of ESPN, about the network's founding. The documentary tells the story of how Bill Rasmussen and his son Scott launched the network.

=== Enterprise Radio Network ===
The all sports radio network Enterprise Radio Network was founded in January 1981 by Scott Rasmussen, the son of Bill Rasmussen, and was shuttered by September 1981. The network broadcast sports reports twice an hour and featured live phone-in sports talk from 6 pm to 8 am Eastern Time, seven days a week. The project failed, and employees were not paid all wages they were due. Both Scott and Bill Rasmussen were sued by the US Department of Labor for allegedly violating the Fair Labor Standards Act of 1938.

=== Other business ===
Rasmussen became involved in plans to build a 12,000-seat golf stadium in Naples, Florida. The project was rife with corruption, with the Naples Daily News describing it as the "biggest public corruption scandal in local history". Rasmussen became a subject of the criminal investigations surrounding the project and pled guilty to two misdemeanor cases of fraud in a plea deal that reduced the charges against him in exchange for his cooperation in the corruption case against the public officials.

== Health and death ==
In July 2019, Rasmussen disclosed that he had been diagnosed with Parkinson's disease. Rasmussen died of the disease at his home in Land O' Lakes, Florida, on August 18, 2026, at the age of 93.
