= Enterprise Radio =

American all-sports radio network (1981)

Enterprise Radio was an American all-sports radio network which operated in 1981. The network fed twice-hourly sports updates and a series of sports talk programs to affiliates across the United States. Based in Avon, Connecticut, the network's content was well-regarded and featured a number of notable sports personalities, but the network burned through cash amid overhiring and poor advertising support. It ceased broadcasting after nine months on the air.

== History ==
Enterprise Radio was formally announced in April 1980 by Scott Rasmussen, the son of ESPN founder Bill Rasmussen. It would broadcast updates at 15 and 45 minutes after the hour as well as 13 hours a day of call-in sports talk, live play-by-play, and specials. (Rasmussen had previously left ESPN in October 1979.) This programming would be fed by the Westar satellite to affiliates, because of increasing AT&T Long Lines expenses. After deciding to lease a studio building instead of building one of its own, Enterprise began broadcasting at 7 p.m. on January 1, 1981, having signed up 36 affiliates in markets across the U.S., though none in its home market of Hartford. It had eight talk show hosts for its 13-hour weekday broadcast schedule. Affiliates split advertising time in network programming evenly with the network; Enterprise required a station air a minimum number of sports updates for access to air its talk shows. Most stations only aired five or six hours of the 13-hour talk show block, primarily the 10 p.m.–1 a.m. slot.

Enterprise never got major sports contracts, with many contracts not up for bid; it presented a bid for Major League Baseball radio rights but lost to CBS. The network carried the 1981 Stanley Cup Finals as well as two boxing matches, between Larry Holmes and Trevor Berbick in April 1981 and Holmes and Leon Spinks two months later. Enterprise Radio also provided coverage of the National Sports Festival in Syracuse, New York, and the 1981 Wimbledon Championships of tennis. Had it continued to the end of the year, the network had rights to the 1981 Astro-Bluebonnet Bowl college football bowl game.

In early August, Enterprise warned it was seeking a partner due to what it called "severe cash flow difficulties". By that time it had 65 affiliates, though its national penetration was about 50 percent. Though the company had gone public, much of the money it raised went to creditors in loans, and it had overhired employees for its launch. It entered into negotiations with real estate investors from California and Arizona, who struggled to complete the deal in a timely fashion. In early September, Enterprise employees appealed to the U.S. Department of Labor for assistance, as they had gone three weeks without pay. The network laid off 20 back-office employees on September 15, but it was not enough. Several of the station's on-air personalities, including Don Chevrier, quit and hired lawyers, seeking back pay. On September 24, the network ceased broadcasting and dismisssed its remaining 75 staff. At the time, Enterprise owed $1.5 million to creditors and $2.2 million in other debts and loans.

Several employees, including senior vice president of broadcast operations John Chanin, sued, alleging Scott Rasmussen made misrepresentations as to the company's finances. Chevrier and John O'Reilly sought the arrest of company officials for signing bad checks; the Connecticut Labor Department sought an arrest warrant for Scott Rasmussen; and the Internal Revenue Service placed a lien on network property. The contents of Enterprise's facilities were auctioned in December to satisfy the secured creditor New England Merchants National Bank.

Rasmussen turned himself in to police in December 1981. His trial on 79 counts of failure to pay wages was delayed into November 1983, when the Rasmussens paid slightly under half the outstanding wage bill.

The next major attempt at all-sports radio was the 1987 flip of New York City radio station WHN to sports as WFAN, which became successful and prosperous when it moved to 660 kHz in 1988.

== Presenters and reporters ==
Enterprise Radio hired a range of recognized sportscasters and players to anchor and report its programs, including:

- Bob Buck
- Curt Chaplin
- Don Chevrier, former Toronto Blue Jays play-by-play announcer
- Ed Coleman
- Bill Denehy, former major league baseball pitcher
- Bill O'Donnell, who presented twice-weekly On the Road features
- John O'Reilly, former host of Weekend World of Sports for ABC Radio
- Bill Russell, to deliver twice-weekly features on sports and society
- John Sterling, former TV play-by-play announcer for the Washington Bullets

Two Enterprise Radio interns, Kevin Harlan and Sean McDonough, became network play-by-play announcers.

== See also ==
- List of United States radio networks
