= Christian Dorsey =

American politician

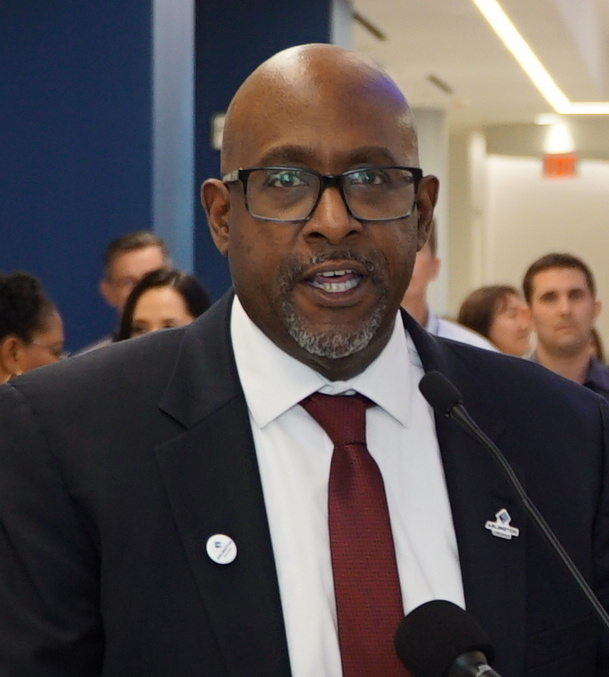
- Dorsey in 2023

Member of the Arlington County Board
- In office January 2016 – December 2023

Personal details
- Born: Atlantic City, New Jersey
- Party: Democratic
- Education: Georgetown University
- Profession: Politician

Christian Dorsey is an American politician in Arlington County, Virginia. He served on the Arlington County Board from 2016 to 2023.

== Education ==
Raised in Atlantic City, New Jersey, Dorsey holds a B.S., International Relations from the Georgetown University School of Foreign Service.

== Career ==
Dorsey joined the Economic Policy Institute in 2008. Dorsey worked to build awareness of economic policy matters on a grassroots level with a goal of educating and mobilizing both middle class and disenfranchised communities for equally shared prosperity.

Dorsey also served as the executive director of the Bonder and Amanda Johnson Community Development Corporation, and as executive director for The Reading Connection, a Northern Virginia-based non-profit organization that provides literacy programs for children.

In November 2015, Dorsey was first elected to the Arlington County Board for its 2016 term. He served as vice-chair in 2018, and as chair in 2019; and again as vice-chair in 2022 and as chair in 2023 until his resignation from the Board on December 31, 2023.

On October 16, 2019, Dorsey declared personal bankruptcy before being re-elected to the Arlington County Board in November. Running largely unopposed and not required to disclose the filing, Dorsey did not notify the public of his bankruptcy. He later clarified that he "should have had a conversation with the community, no matter how difficult." In November 2019, Dorsey was stripped of his chairmanship of the Washington Metro's Finance Committee for failing to disclose a $10,000 donation from Amalgamated Transit Union Local 689 for four months. In January 2020, Dorsey falsely stated he had already returned the donation. In February, Dorsey wrote a reimbursement check that remained uncashed for 5 months, apparently lost in the mail. On July 30, 2020, Dorsey reimbursed the donation and submitted a picture of a cashier's check to various news outlets. In December 2020, a judge dismissed Dorsey's bankruptcy case under a fraud statute, finding that Dorsey had made an overt misrepresentation to the court.
