= Bernard Whitman =

American pollster

- Education: Brown University (BA)
- Occupations: Political pollster and strategist
- Political party: Democratic Party

Bernard Whitman is a Democratic Party political pollster and strategist in the United States. He has appeared as a commentator and strategist on various national news channels like CNN, MSNBC, CNBC, Fox Business, and ABC.

== Early life ==
Whitman graduated magna cum laude from Brown University in 1988.

== Career ==
He joined the political consulting firm PSB Insights in 1991, staying until 2000. He worked as a pollster for President Bill Clinton's administration. Whitman founded Whitman Insight Strategies, a strategic consulting firm, in 2001. The firm served as Michael Bloomberg's pollster in 2009 for the New York City mayoral elections.

He has made media appearances on CNN, MSNBC, CNBC, Fox Business, ABC, and other outlets.

== Bibliography ==
- Whitman, Bernard (2012). 52 reasons to vote for Obama. Velocity-Mascot. ISBN 978-1-62086-097-7. OCLC 800025287.
