= Political consulting =

Industry for advising and assisting political campaigns

Political consulting is a form of consulting that consists primarily of advising and assisting political campaigns. Political consultants are involved in the development and production of mass media (largely television, direct mail, and digital advertising), and they also advise campaigns on other activities, ranging from opposition research and voter polling to field strategy and get out the vote efforts.

== Origins ==
United States president William McKinley's closest political adviser Mark Hanna is sometimes described as the first political consultant. Whitaker and Baxter established the first true political consulting firm, Campaigns, Inc., which focused exclusively on political campaigns in California in the 1930s–1950s. Political consulting further blossomed with the increasing use of television advertising for campaign communications in the 1960s.

Joseph Napolitan was the first person to describe himself as a political consultant; The New York Times described him in a 1968 profile as "that newest American phenomenon, the professional campaign manager" and a "pioneering campaign consultant". In recent years, political consulting has become more commonplace throughout the world and has extended its reach to campaigns at all levels of government. Many consultants work not only for campaigns, but also for parties and political action committees, while some focus on public relations and research work. Many consultants also take up official positions inside governments while working for an officeholder of the ruling party.

== Nature of the work ==
Political consultants sometimes act as political strategists, a senior political consultant who promote the election of certain candidates or the interests of certain groups. This is achieved by planning campaign strategies, coordinating campaign staffers, and arranging events to publicize candidates or causes.

Political consultants act as public relations specialists, salespeople and managers. By using many forms of marketing-suitable media, including advertising and press releases, the general goal of political consultants is to make voters aware of their candidates' party platform.

As political consulting has expanded worldwide, journalists have noted the influence of political consulting on candidates, voters, presidents and governments of different nations. Well-known American political consultants such as James Carville, Frank Luntz, Joseph Napolitan and David H. Sayers, have traveled to other continents, acting as consultants on several political campaigns and advising heads of state. For example, Napolitan acted as a consultant of French President Valéry Giscard d'Estaing, several Venezuelan presidents, and Costa Rica's Óscar Arias Sánchez, and Dick Morris "has consulted for candidates in other countries of the western hemisphere, including the campaigns of Fernando de la Rua for President of Argentina, Jorge Batlle for President of Uruguay, Vicente Fox for President of Mexico, and Raphael Trotman for President of Guyana."

Many Latin American political consultants have also led political campaigns outside of their native countries. One such example is Brazilian political consultant João Santana, who simultaneously led three winning presidential campaigns in Latin America: Danilo Medina, in the Dominican Republic; Hugo Chávez, in Venezuela; and José Eduardo dos Santos, in Angola, in the African continent. Venezuelan political strategist JJ Rendon (who lives in United States), has also been recognized internationally, having been ranked as one of the top five most prominent Latin American consultants by the U.S.-based publication Campaigns & Elections (Latin American edition) and who was the 2014 winner of The Victory Awards for his work as the lead strategist of successful presidential campaigns of Juan Manuel Santos in Colombia (including his reelection campaign in 2014), Porfirio Lobo and Juan Orlando Hernández in Honduras and Enrique Peña Nieto in Mexico, among others. João Santana has been described by the news magazine Veja as "capable of mapping out the weaknesses of adversaries with an acupuncturist's precision." Rendon has been described by Miami New Times as the "Latin America's Karl Rove".

Notable political consultants are: David Plouffe, Steve Bannon, Kellyanne Conway, Lynton Crosby, Joel Benenson, Brad Parscale, Michael Spreng (Angela Merkel), Dominic Cummings, Anne Méaux, Michel von Tell, Alastair Campbell, Paul Manafort, Ivan Redondo, Michel Barnier, Philipp Maderthaner, Prashant Kishor.

== Criticisms ==
=== Notoriety ===
As political consulting has become more prevalent, consultants have become subject to increasing scrutiny and involvement in scandals as journalists have devoted considerable attention to their activities. Some successful political consultants, such as James Carville and Newt Gingrich, capitalize on their consulting fame to become professional pundits. Such political consultants routinely appear on television news programs, write books and are treated as social media celebrities.

=== Conflicts of interest ===
Some detractors accuse political consultants of putting their own interests and images ahead of their clients. Some consultants allege that too many consultants put their own financial interests ahead of the campaigns they are hired to serve, take on too many clients, or focus too much energy on building their own reputations.

In 2007, the Washington Post noted that Democratic presidential candidate John Edwards employed Harrison Hickman, a principal at Global Strategy Group, as his campaign pollster. The article described this hire as evidence of the "pitfalls of hiring consultants who conduct work for corporate clients and campaigns at the same time", noting that:

"...Edwards's own pollster, Harrison Hickman, is a principal at Global Strategy Group, which represents a range of corporate clients -- including oil and pharmaceutical companies -- that don't always mesh with the candidate's message."

=== Other criticism ===
Critics of the political consulting industry blame consultants for what they see as problems in the American election system.

- Consultant salaries have risen, which has increased the cost of political campaigns.
- Critics of consulting's influence on politics say that changes to the campaign landscape have further entrenched certain consultants, regardless of their track records".
- Political consultants may be opposed to low-budget campaigns of grassroots candidates.
- Activist groups charge that political consultants are a major obstacle to participatory democracy and election reform.

== Social media in modern campaigns ==
Social media has dramatically changed the way in which modern political campaigns are run. With younger and more tech-savvy citizens entering into the voting population, social media are the platforms on which the politicians need to establish themselves and engage with the public. In years to come, social media is anticipated to overtake traditional media in terms of importance to political campaigns.

For example, in Australia 86% of Australians access the Internet, and with a 17,048,864 voting age population (according to IDEA), around 14,662,023 voting population has access to Internet, and 65% of them use social media, which means 9,530,314 Australian voters use social media (The 2013 Yellow™ Social Media Report found that among internet users 65% of Australians use social media, up from 62% last year).

The implication of this for political consulting is that social media are the channels through which an increasingly larger portion of the population receives political messages. As a consequence, unless a political consultant addresses the part of the electorate which can preferentially be reached through social media, the portion of the electorate which will be reached through traditional communication technologies will increasingly shrink in the future. For instance, social media is already the main source of information for 26% of young voters in Spain.

== Trade organizations ==
The American Association of Political Consultants is the major trade association for political consultants in the United States, with thousands of members. Like other professional organizations, it propagates a code of ethics and gives out awards. Similar organizations for political consultants exist for many other countries and regions.

== See also ==
- Campaign manager
- Campaigns & Elections, a trade magazine covering political consulting
- Just How Stupid Are We?
- Political campaign staff
