= Cathy Areu =

American writer and news analyst

- Education: Florida State University (BA); Nova Southeastern University (MS)
- Occupation: Journalist
- Years active: 2001–present

Cathy Areu is an American journalist, author, and former educator who appeared on Fox News in the role of the "Liberal Sherpa".

== Early life and education ==
Areu obtained her Bachelor of Arts in English literature from Florida State University in 1992, and a master's degree in English education from Nova Southeastern University, also in Florida. She became a tenured teacher in Florida and gained certification as a teacher in New Jersey.

== Career ==
=== Overview ===
From 2001 to 2012, Areu conducted interviews for The Washington Post's "First Person Singular" column, including with Laura Bush, Al Franken, Alberto Gonzales, Nancy Pelosi and Al Sharpton. She contributed to Latina Style in 2001; she also contributed to People magazine and USA Weekend. In 2001 she founded Catalina, a magazine aimed at Hispanic women. Her book, Latino Wisdom, a collection of stories about America's best-known Hispanic figures, was published by Barricade Books in 2006.

Areu appeared on Fox News's Tucker Carlson Tonight in a recurring 2018 segment as the "Liberal Sherpa", as well as on The O'Reilly Factor, and The Sean Hannity Show. She has also appeared on HLN's Prime News and Showbiz Tonight; on CNN's AC360 and Campbell Brown; and on MSNBC's The Daily Rundown.

=== Lawsuit ===
In July 2020, Areu and another woman filed a lawsuit against Fox News and some of its prominent contributors. The suit states that Areu was sexually harassed at Fox News, including by Sean Hannity, Tucker Carlson, and Howard Kurtz. The organization Times Up said in September 2020 that it was "providing PR support" to Areu. On November 15, 2021, the case was dismissed. The court provided an opportunity to file an amended suit, but Areu never did. The case was dismissed in November 2021 with prejudice.

=== Arrest ===
Areu was arrested in December 2022 and charged with kidnapping, exploitation of the elderly and scheming to defraud her elderly mother. Prosecutors in Miami-Dade County allege Areu stole at least $224,000 in the matter.

== Personal life ==
Areu has two daughters, born circa 2009 and 2011.

== Publications ==
- Latino Wisdom: Celebrity Stories of Hope, Inspiration, and Success to Recharge Your Mind, Body, and Soul. Fort Lee, N.J.: Barricade Books (2006) ISBN 1-569-80309-9
