= Scott Rasmussen =

American businessman (born 1956)

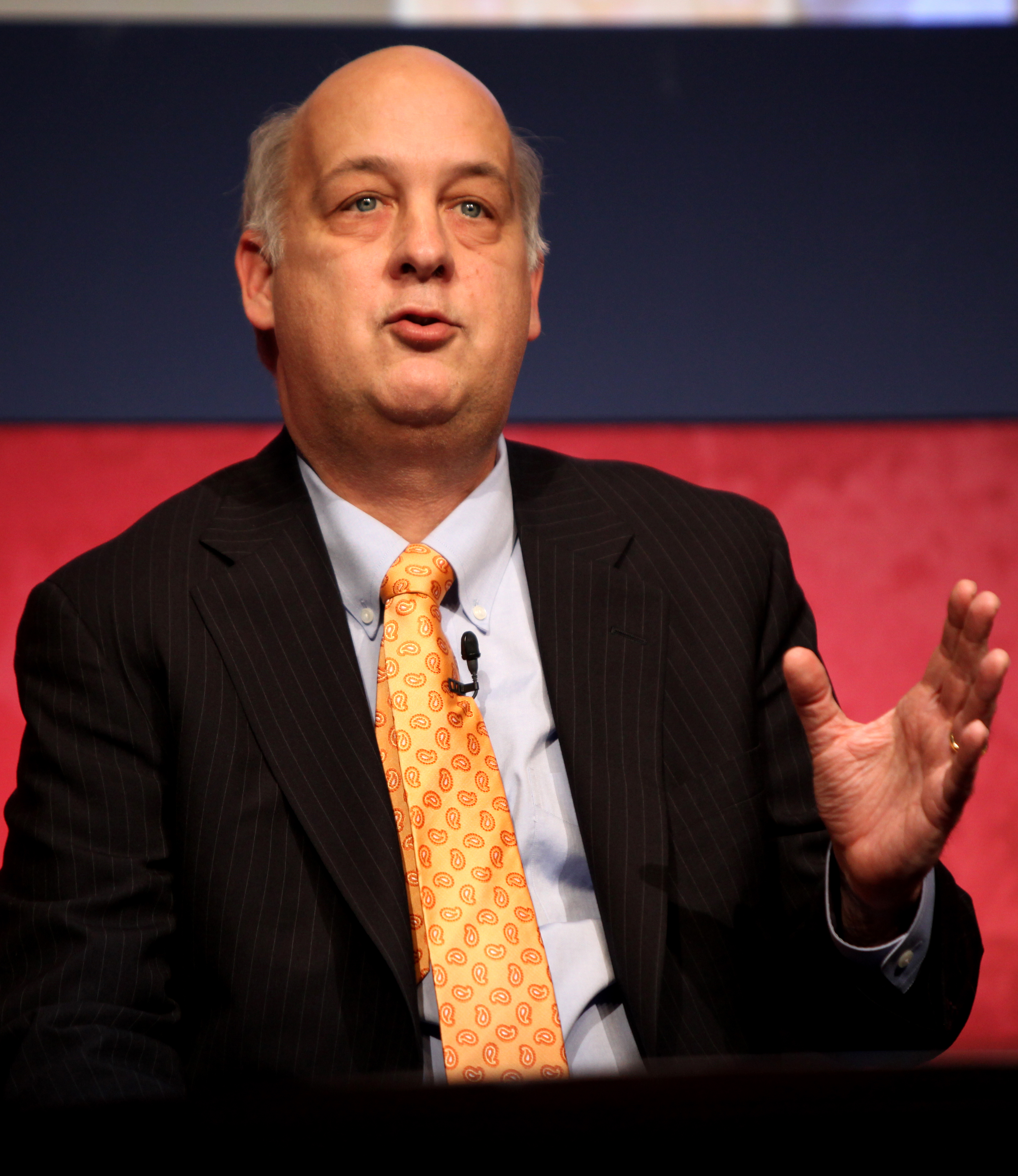
- Rasmussen in 2012
- Born: Scott William Rasmussen; March 30, 1956 (age 70); Eglin Air Force Base, Florida, U.S.
- Education: University of Connecticut; DePauw University (BA); Wake Forest University (MBA)
- Occupation: Political analyst
- Known for: Co-founding ESPN, founding Rasmussen Reports
- Spouse: Laura Rasmussen
- Parents: Bill Rasmussen (father); Lois Ann "Mickey" Rasmussen (mother)
- Website: napolitaninstitute.org

Scott William Rasmussen /ˈræsˌmʌsən/ (born March 30, 1956) is an American public opinion pollster, political analyst, and author. He is the president of RMG Research, founder of the Napolitan Institute, and an editor-at-large for Ballotpedia.

In the 1970s, Rasmussen co-founded the sports network ESPN with his father, Bill Rasmussen. Rasmussen began public opinion polling in the 1980s and founded Rasmussen Reports in 2003, where he was pollster and president for ten years until leaving the company in 2013. After leaving Rasmussen Reports, Rasmussen founded the Rasmussen Media Group. He currently conducts his polling through RMG Research.

Rasmussen is also a New York Times bestselling author and speaker.

== Early life and education ==
Rasmussen was born on Eglin Air Force Base near Valparaiso, Florida, to Lois Ann and Bill Rasmussen. Scott's father was from Chicago, Illinois and attended DePauw University in Indiana, where he met Scott's mother.

From an early age, Rasmussen was exposed to the broadcasting business through his father, who had worked for radio stations and was a communications director for the New England Whalers ice hockey team. With the help of his father, Rasmussen taped his first radio commercial at the age of seven.

Rasmussen grew up spending summers in Ocean Grove, New Jersey, with his grandparents. He got his first job at age 14 as an umbrella boy. He later was an announcer for the New England Whalers of the World Hockey Association. Rasmussen's childhood idol was hockey legend Gordie Howe. Around that time he was emcee for Howe's 50th birthday celebration in 1978, which Rasmussen cites as a highlight of his life: "nothing in my professional career will ever equal the thrill of celebrating [his] birthday."

Rasmussen graduated from Minnechaug Regional High School in 1974 and was goaltender for the high school hockey team. He started college at the University of Connecticut, taking a class from professor Everett Ladd, a pollster and political scientist.

Rasmussen earned a bachelor's degree in history at his father's alma mater, DePauw University in Greencastle, Indiana, graduating in 1986, and later an executive MBA from the Babcock Graduate School of Management at Wake Forest University.

== Founding of ESPN ==
In 1978, Rasmussen and his father, Bill Rasmussen, founded ESPN. They came up with the idea on August 16, 1978, and went on the air on September 7, 1979. In between, they obtained broadcast rights to a wide range of NCAA sports events, obtained funding from Getty Oil, and signed Anheuser-Busch to what was then the largest advertising contract in cable television history. Five years later, the Rasmussens' ownership stake in ESPN was bought out by Texaco, who thereafter sold ESPN to ABC for $237 million. They went on to found the Enterprise Radio Network.

In April 2026, ESPN premiered a documentary, Sports Heaven: The Birth of ESPN, about the network's founding. The documentary tells the story of how Bill Rasmussen and Scott Rasmussen launched the network. In August 1978, the two took a day off to drive to visit family and promised not to discuss business. They did discuss potential programming for their newly acquired satellite transponder, with Scott saying "I don't care what you do with it; show football all day and see if I care." According to Scott, "For the first time during the ride, my father didn't yell back at me. He said, 'That's it. Sports all day, every day.'" The ESPN documentary noted that "After founding ESPN, Bill and Scott's lives took different paths. They have been estranged ever since." Bill Rasmussen died in August 2026. After his father's death, Scott wrote: "I will never forget the car ride on August 16, 1978, and am still amazed at what it helped create. My most cherished memory of my father was at about 6 pm on September 7, 1979 — one hour before ESPN went on the air. We snuck around the back of the building and had a moment alone to reflect on all that had happened since that car ride. Later, our journeys through life took different paths, but I am grateful we had that brief moment together and am proud of what we accomplished."

== Public opinion polling ==
Rasmussen first became known for his public opinion polling work. In the 1990s, he was a leader of the term limits movement. He continues to conduct polls for U.S. Term Limits. In 1995, he founded a polling company called GrassRoots Research. In 1999, after changing the name to Rasmussen Research, the company was bought by TownPagesNet.com for about $4.5 million in ordinary shares.

The Washington Post referred to Rasmussen as "a driving force in American politics" and "an articulate and frequent guest on Fox News and other outlets, where his nominally nonpartisan data is often cited to support Republican talking points." In the Wall Street Journal, political journalist John Fund called him "America's insurgent pollster".

Susan Estrich, the first female campaign manager of a major presidential campaign, said of him, "If you really want to know what people in America think, you can't find a smarter guy to ask than Scott Rasmussen."

Rasmussen has described himself as "an independent pollster" who "[l]ike the company he started, [...] maintains his independence and has never been a campaign pollster or consultant for candidates seeking office." Speaking about the use of his polling data by Republicans, in 2009 Rasmussen said, "Republicans right now are citing our polls more than Democrats because it’s in their interest to do so. I would not consider myself a political conservative — that implies an alignment with Washington politics that I don’t think I have."

In 2010, some Democrats criticized Rasmussen's polling methodology. Democratic pollster Mark Mellman said Rasmussen Reports polls "tend to be among the worst polls for Democrats." Tom Jensen, a pollster for Democratic firm Public Policy Polling said: "The way [Rasmussen] does polls is that he's more likely to get high-energy voters. I think Rasmussen favors Republicans this year, but I don't think he inherently favors Republicans."

In August 2018, Rasmussen released a public opinion website, ScottRasmussen.com, in conjunction with the announcement of a partnership between ScottRasmussen.com and HarrisX, an online research company under The Stagwell Group, which was founded by former pollster and adviser to President Bill Clinton, Mark Penn.

Former U.S. House Speaker Newt Gingrich said that "Scott Rasmussen has done America an enormous service. He identified the driving forces behind the destructive radicalism which is pushing us into a cultural civil war."

=== Napolitan Institute ===
Rasmussen founded the Napolitan Institute in 2024. Through the Napolitan Institute and RMG Research, Rasmussen conducts polling focused on the "Elite One Percent" and federal government managers. Rasmussen's surveys of federal government managers revealed that a significant number of federal employees would not obey a legal order from President Trump.

In July 2025, the Napolitan Institute announced an AI-based partnership with Jigsaw, a technology incubator created by Google. The partnership involved convening online conversations with Americans from every congressional district and presenting the public opinion gleaned from these conversations in a 2026 commemoration of the United States Semiquincentennial. 2,500 people from across the U.S. were surveyed and their views were synthesized into 27 shared American ideals. In April 2026, Rasmussen presented the findings to the American Philosophical Society (APS). The APS was founded by Benjamin Franklin and serves as a museum next to Independence Hall in Philadelphia. The APS accepted the "Declaration of American Ideals" into its archives and is displaying it as part of its public collection in 2026 during the U.S. Semiquincentennial. Rasmussen said the findings show that "We are not a 50-50 polarized nation. What I believe we are is a 10-10-80 nation. There are people on both the left and the right who reject America's founding ideals… [but] 80% of Americans hate the political fighting."

Rasmussen has written that the largest divide in U.S. politics is not between Republicans and Democrats, but between what he calls "the political class and everyday Americans." According to Rasmussen, the political class believes the U.S. people have too much individual freedom, while most voters think there is not enough individual freedom. He writes that "This dynamic created a 10-10-80 nation where ten percent on the left are engaged in a bitter political war with ten percent on the right. Both sides are more interested in defeating the other ten percenters than caring about or listening to the 80 percent." Rasmussen likened modern U.S. politics to The Hunger Games, wherein "The corrupt system itself was the problem, the real enemy," and described President Donald Trump as the president of District 13.

=== Rasmussen Reports ===
In 2003, Rasmussen founded Rasmussen Reports, LLC, a U.S.-based public opinion polling company, to track consumer confidence, investor confidence, and presidential approval. Rasmussen Reports has been called "one of the most consistently interesting polling and analytics companies," generating a daily cycle of news reports based on original survey results as well as political, business, economic and lifestyle content. Unlike traditional pollsters whose polls are often influenced by partisanship, the company's business model relies on website advertising and paid subscriptions for premium content. Rasmussen Reports' polls were notable for their use of automated public opinion polling, involving pre-recorded telephone inquiries, which have been shown to produce accurate results at low cost.

In 2009, Noson Lawen Partners provided a significant investment in Rasmussen Reports. In 2010, Rasmussen Reports was one of two firms providing daily tracking updates of the president's job approval ratings as well as consumer confidence. By 2012, Rasmussen Reports had garnered a national reputation for providing "reliable, newsworthy and actionable public opinion data," receiving over one million visits per day during the presidential election that year.

In January 2013, Rasmussen informed his investors that he would not be renewing his contract without changes in the company's business and operations. In a press release from Rasmussen Reports, the company confirmed Rasmussen's departure and said, "[i]n part, the move reflects disagreements over company business strategies .... The Company emphasized that Mr. Rasmussen's legacy remains intact. His polling methodologies and protocols, widely acknowledged as among the most accurate and reliable in the industry, continue to guide and inform the company's public opinion survey techniques. In addition, the editorial culture of excellence that he built is still very much in place."

In 2024, Michael Hiltzik wrote in The Los Angeles Times that "Rasmussen Reports used to be a fairly creditable and credible political polling organization," but that in the years since Scott Rasmussen's departure "Not only have its results become more sharply partisan, favoring Republican and conservative politicians, but it also has increasingly promoted right-wing conspiracy theories." Scott Rasmussen has noted his separation from the firm on social media, tweeting: "For clarity, I left my old firm more than a decade ago and have had nothing to do with it since."

== Books ==
In 2010, Rasmussen co-authored a book with pollster Douglas Schoen, Mad as Hell: How the Tea Party Movement is Fundamentally Remaking Our Two-Party System, explaining the causes of Tea Party movement's frustrations, namely excessive federal spending, high taxes, and a failure of politicians in Washington to listening to the people.

In his 2010 book titled In Search of Self-Governance, Rasmussen argued that Americans would rather govern themselves rather than being governed from the left, the right, or even center and this desire for self-governance is under assault by elites in Washington, D.C. and Wall Street."

Rasmussen's 2012 book, The People's Money: How Voters Will Balance the Budget and Eliminate the Federal Debt, argues through polling data, that the federal government does not have the consent of the governed. The book reached number 17 on the New York Times Bestseller List in March 2012.

In 2018, Rasmussen authored a book entitled The Sun is Still Rising: Politics Has Failed But America Will Not. While expressing a general sense of pessimism as to the political process in America, Rasmussen makes a case for the "legitimacy" of optimism in the virtual and psychical communities outside of Washington, D.C. that allow the talents of individuals flourish. Jonathan Rauch, senior fellow at the Brookings Institution, said of the book: "in this optimistic, open-hearted book, Scott Rasmussen delivers a spirited and timely reminder that civic groups, innovative businesses, and personal networks are where the real action will be in the 21st century—and that their potential to improve our lives and our country is vast."

In 2026, Rasmussen's book Out of Touch: The Elite One Percent and the Battle for America's Soul was published by Simon & Schuster.

== Television ==
For many years, Rasmussen was a regular guest on Fox News, appearing on shows including Fox & Friends, Hannity, The Factor, and America Live.

In 2010 he made an appearance on Comedy Central's The Colbert Report.

From 2012 through 2013, Rasmussen hosted a syndicated television show called What America Thinks With Scott Rasmussen with WCBS-TV. An episode of the show titled What New Hampshire Thinks won a 2012 Granite Mike Award from the New Hampshire Association of Broadcasters.

He appeared as himself in the movie A Long Way Off (2014).

In February 2018, Rasmussen participated as a panelist in a televised discussion moderated by former Hewlett-Packard chairman and CEO Carly Fiorina, discussing the implications and impact of the recently enacted tax reform package.

== Personal life ==
Rasmussen lives in Florida with his wife, Laura.

Speaking about his political views, Rasmussen said, "I was brought up loosely as a Republican, but at our family dinner table we talked about the important politics of the New York Giants and the New York Yankees. There was no political discussion in my life growing up. I became a Democrat after Richard Nixon and into the Jimmy Carter era and have been an Independent ever since. I spoke today about how the American people were skeptical about politicians—well, I'm more skeptical. I really do see the core issue as the political class versus mainstream voters. I think that is a much bigger gap than Republican, Democrat, conservative, or liberal."

In March 2010, Rasmussen's home was destroyed by a fire. Rasmussen noted thereafter that his local community—the "local government, our insurance company, our church, local businesses, our neighbors and the kindness of strangers"—were instrumental in the recovery process. Rasmussen also cited this experience as an inspiration for the "upbeat message" in his book, Politics Has Failed: America Will Not.

From 2006 to 2011, Rasmussen was volunteer president of the Ocean Grove Camp Meeting Association (OGCMA), "a ministry organization whose mission is to provide opportunities for spiritual birth, growth, and renewal in a Christian seaside setting." OGCMA is affiliated with the United Methodist Church.

== Bibliography ==
- Out of Touch: The Elite One Percent and the Battle for America's Soul (2026)
- The Sun Is Still Rising: Politics Has Failed But America Will Not (2018)
- Politics Has Failed: America Will Not. Sutherland Institute. 2017. ISBN 9780998960401.
- The People's Money: How Voters Will Balance the Budget and Eliminate the Federal Debt. Threshold Editions. 2012. ISBN 978-1451666106.
- In Search of Self-Governance. CreateSpace. 2010. ISBN 978-1449593544.
- Mad As Hell: How the Tea Party Movement Is Fundamentally Remaking Our Two-Party System. Harper. 2010. ISBN 978-0061995231. (with Doug Schoen)
- A Better Deal: Social Security Choice. Rasmussen Reports. 2001. ISBN 0971233004.
- Solving the Budget Crisis: Hope for America's Future. Pub Marketing Group. 1985. ISBN 0934347018.
