= Postage stamps and postal history of Hawaii =

This is a survey of the postage stamps and postal history of Hawaii.

The Hawaiian Islands occupy most of an archipelago in the central Pacific Ocean, southwest of the continental United States. It was governed by the Kingdom of Hawaii until 1893, Provisional Government of Hawaii through 1894, and Republic of Hawaii until 1898. It became the Territory of Hawaii in 1898 and then US State of Hawaii in 1959.

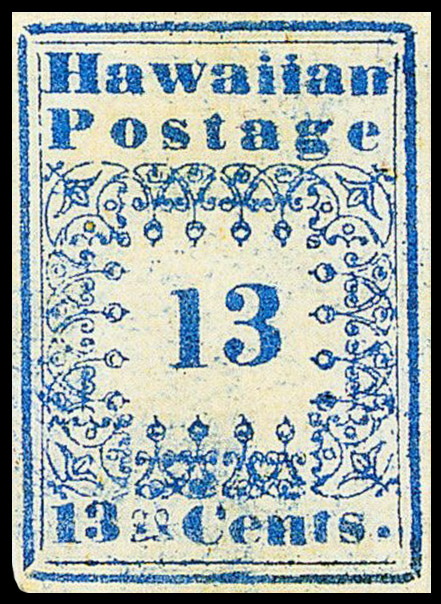
An 1851 13c Hawaiian Missionary stamp

== First stamps ==
The first stamps of Hawaii were the Hawaiian Missionaries issued in 1851 by Henry Martyn Whitney (son of missionaries).

== Later issues ==
Beginning in 1853, the government of Hawaii began issuing stamps engraved with the busts of members of the royal family of the Kingdom of Hawaii.

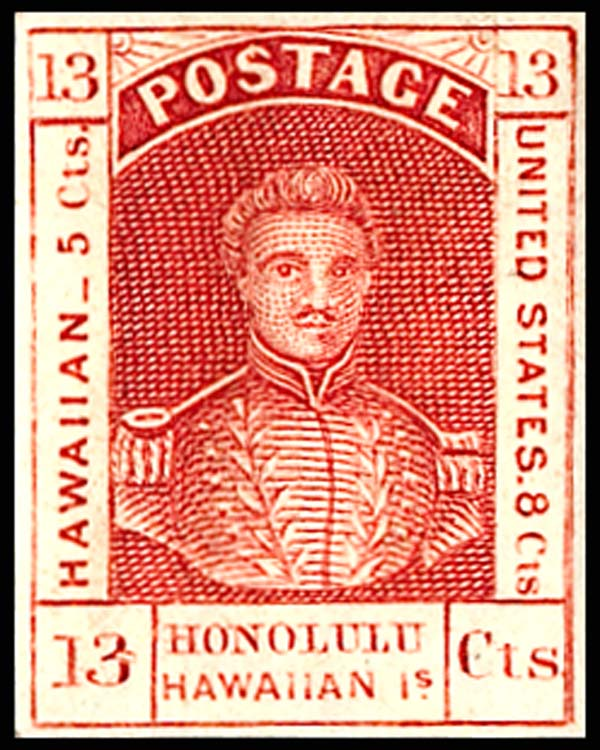
Stamp of Hawaii, 1853, King Kamehameha III

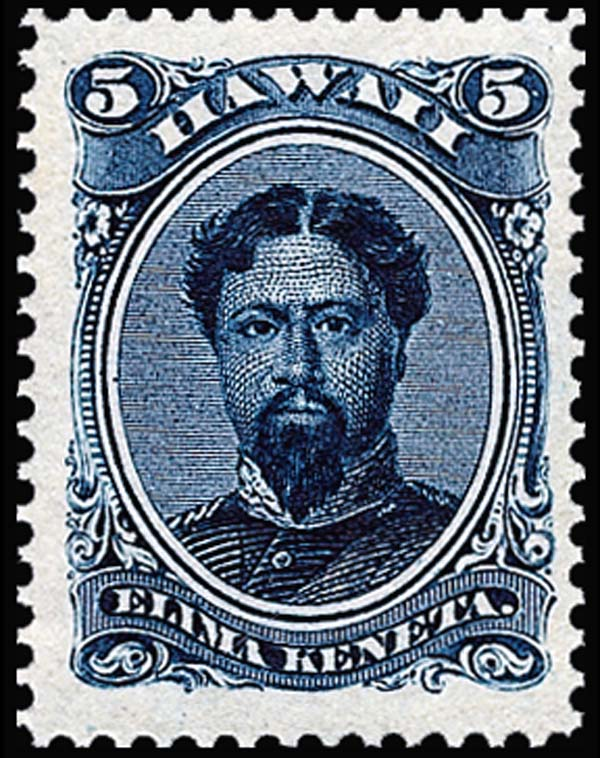
Stamp of Hawaii, 1866, King Kamehameha V

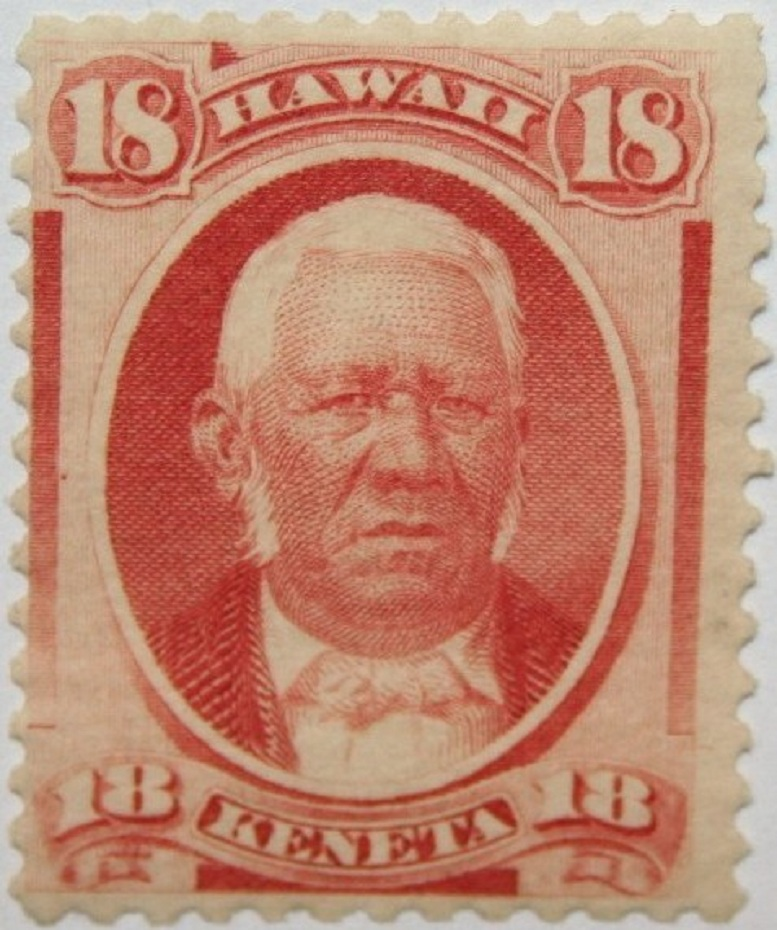
Stamp of Hawaii, 1871, Mataio Kekūanaōʻa

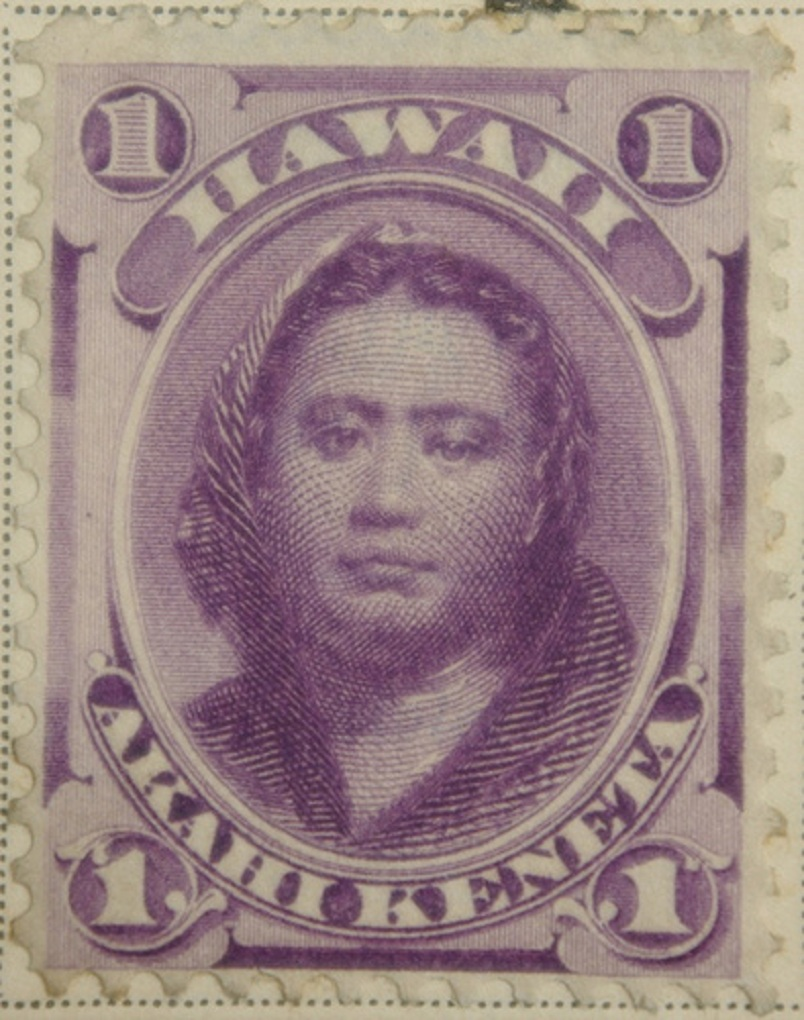
Stamp of Hawaii, 1878, Princess Kamāmalu

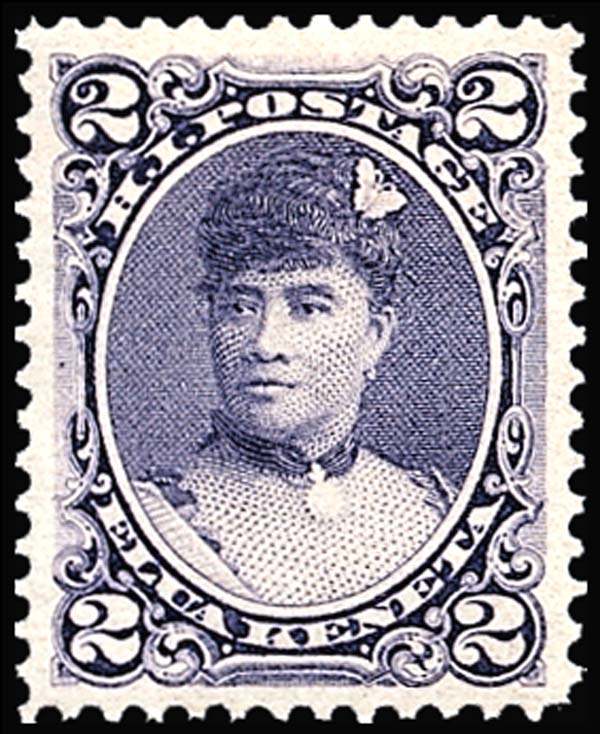
Stamp of Hawaii, 1891, Queen Liliʻuokalani

== Provisional government ==
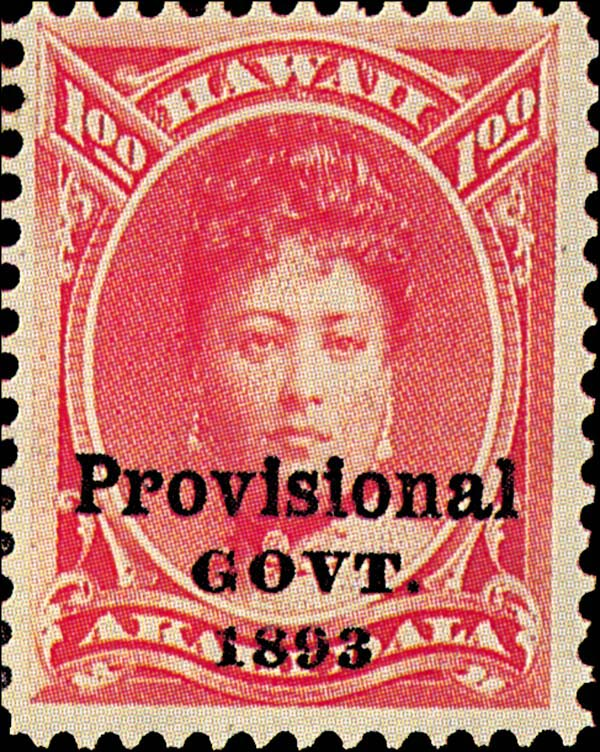
A stamp depicting Queen Emma Kaleleonālani overprinted Provisional Govt. in 1893

Following the overthrow of the Kingdom of Hawaii in 1893, the Provisional Government overprinted existing stamps.

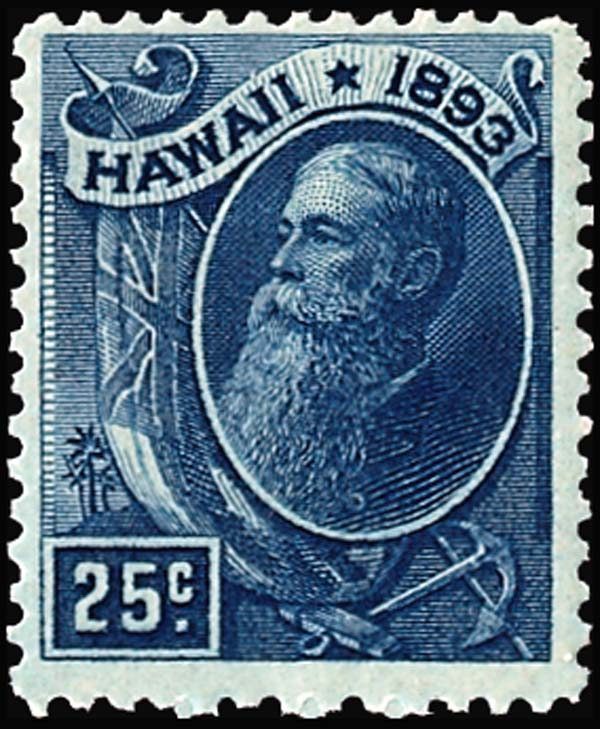
An 1894 stamp depicting Sanford B. Dole, President of the Republic of Hawaii

== Republican government ==
The Republic of Hawaii was established on July 4, 1894, and the republican government issued a set of stamps in 1894.

== Final issues ==
The last stamps for Hawaii were issued in 1899 after the Territory of Hawaii had been established.

== See also ==
- Hawaiian Missionaries
- Hawaiian Philatelic Society
- Revenue stamps of Hawaii
- Ryohei Ishikawa
