= Georgius Y. Cannon =

American architect (1892–1987)

Georgius Young Cannon (March 6, 1892 – March 29, 1987) was a 20th-century architect in the American West who operated principally out of Salt Lake City, Utah. Cannon trained at the Massachusetts Institute of Technology (MIT), graduating in 1918. He then joined the army and later returned to Utah to intern with the architectural firm Ware & Treganza and Cannon & Fetzer. He served two missions to Germany for the Church of Jesus Christ of Latter-day Saints (LDS Church).

For a time, Cannon moved to Los Angeles and worked as the office manager of his MIT schoolmate Wallace Neff. He later returned to Utah and designed numerous buildings, mostly residences, and some of which remain on the National Register of Historic Places. Among his works were meetinghouses of the LDS Church and other civic buildings. Cannon served on a church-appointed board of six architects that oversaw the construction of the Idaho Falls Idaho Temple.

== Personal life ==
Cannon was the youngest of 32 children born to LDS Church leader George Q. Cannon. His mother, Caroline Young Cannon, was a daughter of Brigham Young. He was the half-brother to another architect, Lewis T. Cannon. Georgius was orphaned at age 11. He married Phyllis Winder and they had a daughter born in 1930, Dorothy Winder Cannon Webb (Allen Paul Webb). Grandchildren - Douglas Cannon Webb, Terrill Phyllis Webb Helander, Lawrence Scott Webb.

== List of works ==
- Glendale Ward Meetinghouse
- Federal Heights Ward Meetinghouse
- Arlington Ward Chapel (4375 Jackson Street, Riverside, California)
- Layton 3rd Ward Chapel
- Layton 8th Ward Chapel
- Springville Carnegie Library (1922)
- Sigma Chi Fraternity House *NRHP listed
- Beehive House (restoration) *NRHP listed
- Mr. and Mrs. Roy Bullen (1435 Circle Way, Salt Lake City, Utah) (1930)
- Alterations to Residence for Mr. and Mrs. Henry D. Moyle (1918 Lakewood Drive, Cottonwood Utah)
- Residence for Dr. and Mrs. Spencer Wright (Salt Lake City, Utah) (1936)
- Residence for Mr. and Mrs. Julian M. Bamberger (1525 Penrose, Salt Lake City, Utah)(1936)
- Architectural Drawings for Mr. and Mrs. Alfred Werker, (Toluca Lake, CA.) ( 1937; 1940)
- Residence for Dr. and Mrs. Weldell J. Thompson (Ogden, Utah) (1949)
- Residence for Mr. and Mrs. Eastman Hatch (1435 Circle Way, Salt Lake City, Utah) (1932-1953)
- Residence for Duke and Jan Cranney (342 Crestwood Rd, Kaysville, Utah) (1956)/Mayor Brit Howard and Interior and Architectural Designer Link Konizeski(1989)
- Governor's Residence (Virginia St. and Fairfax Ave., (Salt Lake City, Utah)(1958)
- Residence for Mr. and Mrs. Ira B. Sharp (1152 Bonneville Dr., Salt Lake City, Utah)(1962-1964)
- Residence for Mr. and Mrs. J. Alma Burrows (970 East Capitol Blvd., Salt Lake City, Utah)(1962-1972)
- Residence for Mrs. Stanford Stark (746 16th Ave., Salt Lake City, Utah)(1962)
- Residence for Mr. and Mrs. Wallace L. Bransford (Cottonwood Circle, Lot #2)(1962-1963)
- Residence for Mr. and Mrs. George T. Stromm (1190 Oak Hills Way, Salt Lake City, Utah) (1965)
- Residence for John and Marylin Dahlstrom Residence, (Salt Lake City, Utah)(1972-1975)
