= George Q. Cannon =

American religious leader (1827–1901)

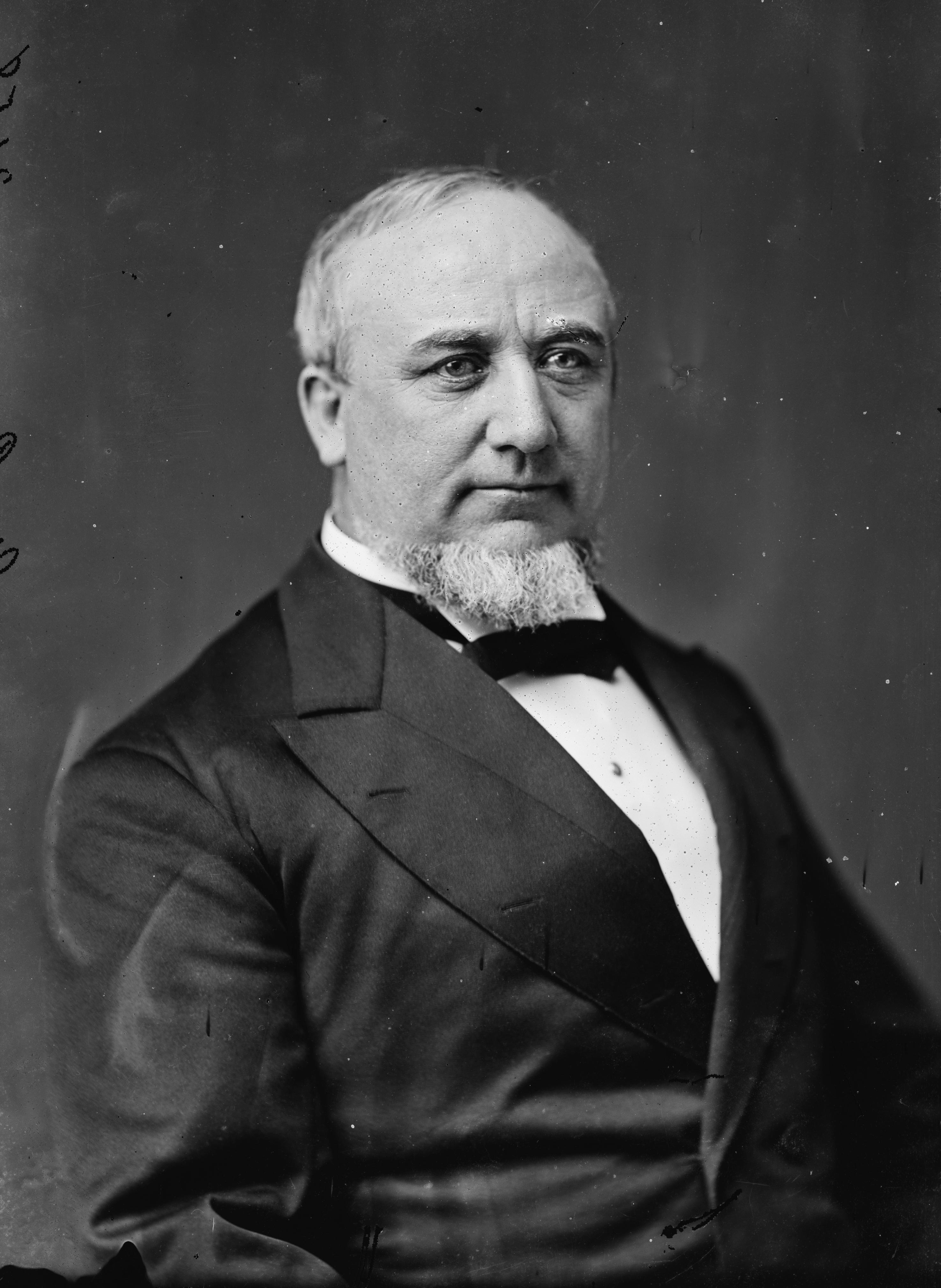
- Cannon, 1870–1880

First Counselor in the First Presidency
- September 13, 1898 – April 12, 1901
- Called by: Lorenzo Snow

First Counselor in the First Presidency
- April 7, 1889 – September 2, 1898
- Called by: Wilford Woodruff
- End reason: Dissolution of First Presidency upon death of Wilford Woodruff

Quorum of the Twelve Apostles
- July 25, 1887 – April 7, 1889
- End reason: Called as First Counselor in the First Presidency

First Counselor in the First Presidency
- October 10, 1880 – July 25, 1887
- Called by: John Taylor
- End reason: Dissolution of First Presidency upon death of John Taylor

Quorum of the Twelve Apostles
- August 29, 1877 – October 10, 1880
- End reason: Called as First Counselor in the First Presidency

Assistant Counselor in the First Presidency
- May 9, 1874 – August 29, 1877
- Called by: Brigham Young
- End reason: Dissolution of First Presidency upon death of Brigham Young

Counselor in the First Presidency
- June 8, 1873 – May 9, 1874
- Called by: Brigham Young
- End reason: Called as Assistant Counselor in the First Presidency

Quorum of the Twelve Apostles
- August 26, 1860 – June 8, 1873
- Called by: Brigham Young
- End reason: Called as Counselor in the First Presidency

LDS Church Apostle
- August 26, 1860 – April 12, 1901
- Called by: Brigham Young
- Reason: Death of Parley P. Pratt
- Reorganization at end of term: Rudger Clawson added to First Presidency

Delegate to the U.S. House of Representatives from Utah Territory's at-large district

In office
- March 4, 1873 – February 25, 1882
- Predecessor: William Henry Hooper
- Successor: John T. Caine
- Political party: Democrat

Personal details
- Born: George Quayle Cannon; January 11, 1827; Liverpool, England, United Kingdom
- Died: April 12, 1901 (aged 74); Monterey, California, U.S.
- Resting place: Salt Lake City Cemetery; 40°46′37.92″N 111°51′28.8″W
- Spouse(s): Elizabeth Hoagland; Sarah Jane Jenne; Eliza L. Tenney; Martha Telle; Emily Hoagland; Caroline Young
- Children: 43
- Parents: George Cannon; Ann Quayle
- Relatives: Ambassador Cavendish W. Cannon (Grandson)
- Signature
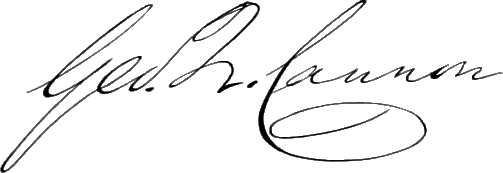

George Quayle Cannon (January 11, 1827 – April 12, 1901) was an early member of the Quorum of the Twelve Apostles of the Church of Jesus Christ of Latter-day Saints (LDS Church), and served in the First Presidency under four successive presidents of the church: Brigham Young, John Taylor, Wilford Woodruff, and Lorenzo Snow. He was the church's chief political strategist, and was dubbed "the Mormon premier" and "the Mormon Richelieu" by the press. He was also a five-time Utah territorial delegate to the U.S. Congress.

== Early life ==
Cannon was born in Liverpool, England, to George Cannon and Ann Quayle, the eldest of six children. His mother and father were from Peel on the Isle of Man. His father's sister, Leonora Cannon, had married future Latter Day Saint apostle John Taylor and was baptized in 1836. News reached the elder George Cannon and four years later, when Taylor came to Liverpool, the entire Cannon family was baptized into the Church of Jesus Christ of Latter-day Saints; George Q. Cannon was 13 years old at the time. Cannon's siblings were Mary Alice Cannon (Lambert), Ann Cannon (Woodbury), Angus M. Cannon, David H. Cannon, and Leonora Cannon (Gardner). In 1842, the Cannon family set sail for the United States to join with the church in Nauvoo, Illinois. On the voyage over the Atlantic Ocean, Cannon's mother died. The motherless family arrived safely in Nauvoo in the spring of 1843. George Sr. married Mary Edwards in 1844 and had another daughter, Elizabeth Cannon (Piggott).

In Nauvoo, Cannon's father sent him to live with his uncle and aunt, John and Leonora Taylor. Cannon worked in the printing office of the Times and Seasons and the Nauvoo Neighbor for Taylor, who was an editor of both periodicals. In June 1844, Taylor accompanied Joseph Smith, Hyrum Smith, and Willard Richards and others to Carthage Jail. There, Joseph and Hyrum were killed, and Taylor sustained serious bullet wounds. Cannon tended the printing affairs while Taylor recovered. This training would serve him well in later life. Cannon's father died in 1845.

In 1846, Taylor traveled to England to organize the affairs of the church after Smith's death. Meanwhile, Cannon accompanied Taylor's wife and family as they moved to Winter Quarters, Nebraska. When Taylor returned, Cannon traveled with the entire Taylor family to the Salt Lake Valley, arriving in October 1847.

== Church service ==
In 1849, Cannon was asked by church president Brigham Young to serve as a missionary for the church in California. This assignment involved working the mines and attempting to preach the gospel to gold miners. After doing this for several months Cannon and several other mining missionaries were asked to head to the Kingdom of Hawaii, where he served for four years.

Initially the missionaries in Hawaii focused on teaching European and Euro-Americans in the islands. Cannon was the first missionary to focus on teaching natives on the island of Maui. While in the islands, Cannon taught and baptized many Native Hawaiians. He also organized multiple branches of the church and on occasions met with government ministers of the Kingdom of Hawaii to get the church recognition. One of the most notable was Jonatana Napela, who assisted Cannon in translating the Book of Mormon into Hawaiian. Joseph F. Smith, a future church president, would follow Cannon and serve in Hawaii one year later. Cannon eventually was made district president over multiple branches in Maui. By October 1852, there were slightly over 900 members of the LDS Church in Hawaii with most on the island of Maui.

Returning to Utah Territory, Cannon married Elizabeth Hoagland (daughter of Abraham Hoagland and his wife.) He was almost immediately called to assist apostle Parley P. Pratt in publishing a newspaper in California. Meeting Pratt in California, Cannon was told that he would remain behind and became president of the church's Oregon and California Mission; he held this position from 1856 to 1858. During this period of time, Cannon published the Hawaiian translation of the Book of Mormon. In February 1856, he started the Western Standard, a weekly publication based in San Francisco.

Returning to Utah in 1857 to assist in the Utah War, Cannon was commissioned a Lieutenant General in the Nauvoo Legion. During this time, Cannon served as printer of the Deseret News while it was publishing in exile in Fillmore, Utah. After the Utah War, he was called as president of the church's Eastern States Mission.

=== Apostle ===
The murder of Parley P. Pratt in 1857 created a vacancy in the Quorum of the Twelve Apostles. That vacancy was not filled until Brigham Young called Cannon to the apostleship three years later. Cannon was ordained to the priesthood office of apostle on August 26, 1860, at age 33. Upon his joining the Quorum of the Twelve, Cannon was called to preside over the church's European Mission.

Cannon's mission in Europe ended when he was recalled by Young in 1862 to work in Washington, D.C., to assist in the church's promotion of Utah Territory's bid for statehood. At the adjournment of the 1862 congressional session, Cannon again left for Europe to preside over the mission. In this capacity, Cannon was the editor of the Millennial Star and, for a short time, the church's Welsh-language periodical, Udgorn Seion.

From 1867 to 1874, Cannon was the managing editor of the Deseret News. It was under his direction that the newspaper was first published on a daily basis.

In 1866, Cannon began publication of a magazine for youth and young adult Latter-day Saints called The Juvenile Instructor. He owned and published this magazine until his death; in 1901 his family sold the magazine to the LDS Church's Sunday School organization. The periodical was the official organ of the Sunday School until 1930, when it was replaced with The Instructor. Cannon also served as the first general superintendent of the church's Sunday School from 1867 until his death.

=== First Presidency ===
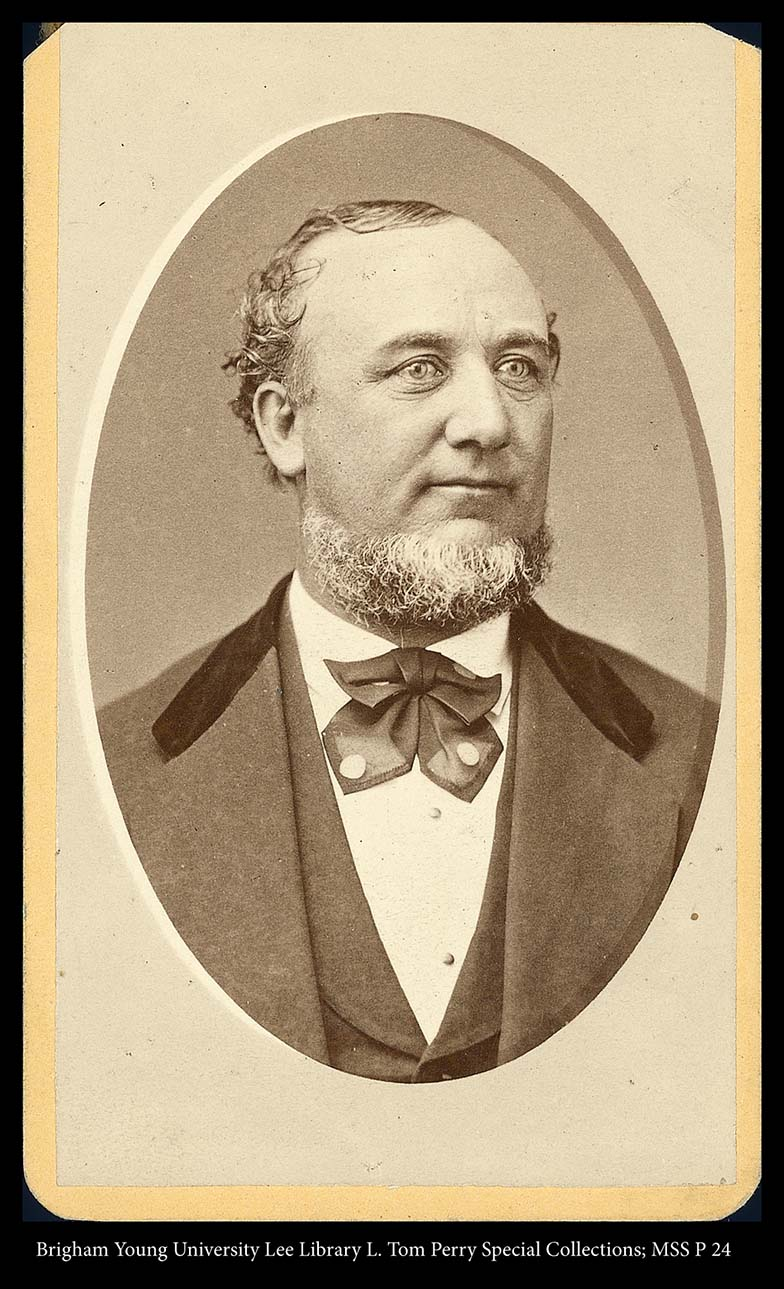
Image of Cannon taken by Charles Roscoe Savage sometime between 1870 and 1873

On April 8, 1873, Cannon became a member of the church's First Presidency when he was called as an assistant counselor by Brigham Young. Cannon went on to serve as counselor to three more presidents of the church: he was First Counselor to John Taylor, Wilford Woodruff, and Lorenzo Snow.

Although Cannon was the second-most senior apostle of the church after the death of Woodruff, Cannon did not become President of the Quorum of the Twelve Apostles, as would be the practice in the LDS Church today. Rather, because Cannon was a member of the First Presidency, the church simply appointed the next senior apostle of the church—Brigham Young Jr.—to be the quorum president. (Under today's practices, Cannon would have been appointed the president of the quorum and Young would have been appointed acting president.)

== Political life and plural marriage ==
Cannon was elected to be the non-voting delegate for Utah Territory in the United States Congress in 1872. He remained a congressional delegate until 1882, when his seat was declared vacant by the enactment of the Edmunds Act, which terminated many political and civil rights for Utah's Mormon polygamists.

=== Dispute in the 47th Congress ===
By 1880, Cannon had served four terms in Congress as Utah territorial delegate.

The newly appointed anti-Mormon territorial governor, Eli Houston Murray, openly supported the Liberal Party, which generally opposed church candidates. The 1880 territory-wide election for a congressional delegate brought the Liberal Party unexpectedly close to sending a representative to Washington, DC. The Liberal candidate, Allen G. Campbell, with 1357 votes, lost resoundingly to Cannon, who had 18,567 votes. However, before Governor Murray certified the election, a protest on behalf of Campbell was filed. The protest listed a dozen claims, chiefly that Cannon, born in England, was not a naturalized citizen but an alien. The protest also claimed that Cannon's participation in polygamy was incompatible with federal law and a delegate's oath of office. Murray agreed and issued certification to Campbell, in spite of his poor showing.

Cannon, in Washington at the time, argued that only Congress could decide on a member's qualifications. He furthermore received a certificate from sympathetic territorial election officials that stated he had received the most votes. That document convinced the House of Representatives clerk to enter Cannon's name on the roll and so Cannon began drawing the delegate's salary.

Both Murray and Campbell traveled to Washington to dispute the seat. Each side battled over the position for over a year, even after the assassination of President James Garfield. On February 25, 1882, the House of Representatives finally rejected both candidates. The House refused Cannon his seat on the basis of his involvement in polygamy. In the end, the House seated John T. Caine as the Delegate during the 47th Congress. Caine went on to serve for several years.

The issue brought unfavorable national attention to Utah, which contributed to the Edmunds Act being signed into law on March 23, 1882. The act reinforced the 1862 Morrill Anti-Bigamy Act by declaring polygamy a felony and also revoked polygamists' right to vote, made them ineligible for jury service, and prohibited them from holding political office.

=== Plural marriage ===
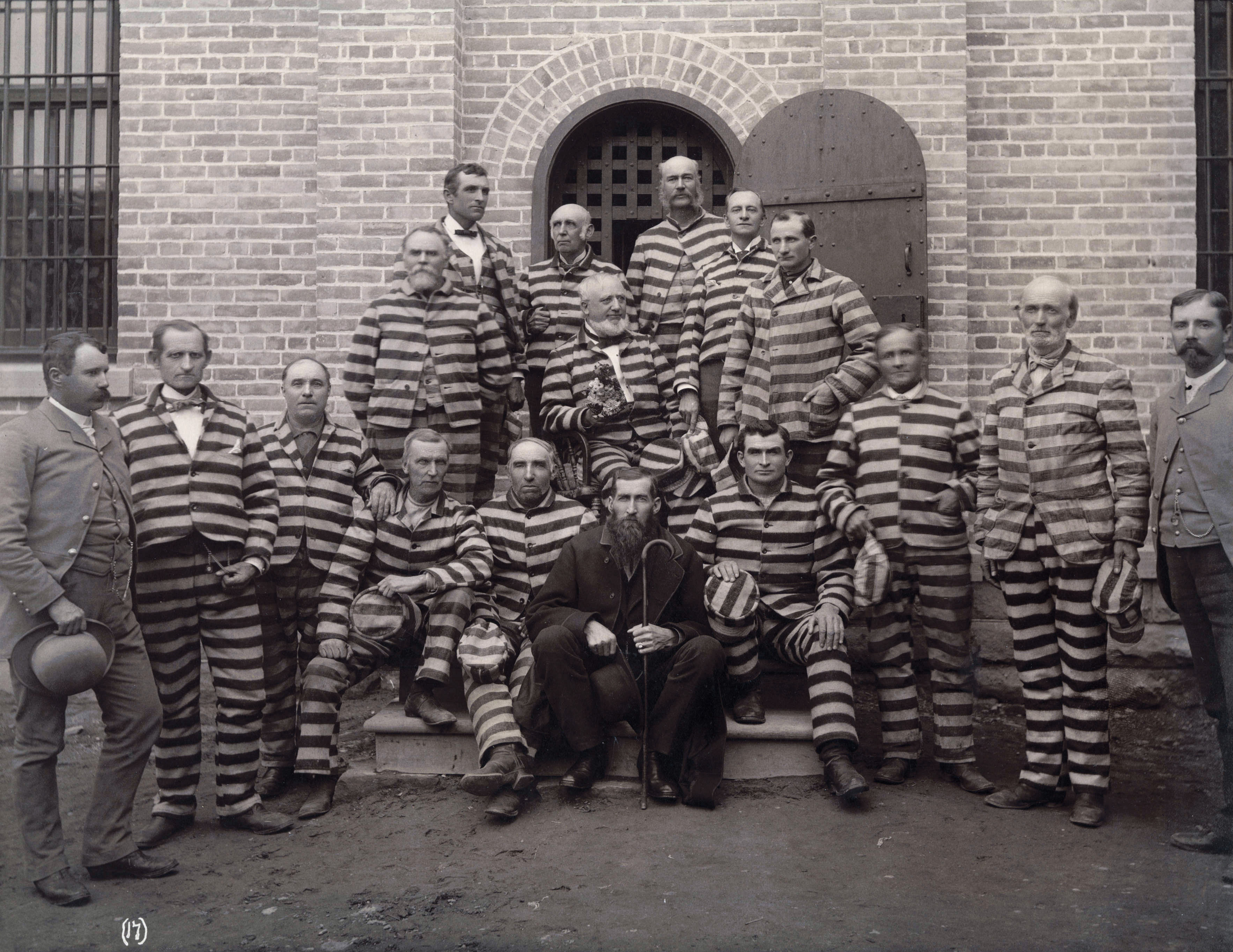
1889 portrait of polygamists in prison, at the Utah Penitentiary, including Cannon, arrested under the Edmunds-Tucker Act

Cannon practiced plural marriage and was married to six women. Cannon frequently spoke in justification of the practice.

When the Supreme Court upheld the ban on plural marriage in the 1879 Reynolds v. United States decision, Cannon stated:

Our crime has been: We married women instead of seducing them; we reared children instead of destroying them; we desired to exclude from the land prostitution, bastardy and infanticide. If George Reynolds [the man who was convicted of committing bigamy] is to be punished, let the world know the facts. ... Let it be published to the four corners of the earth that in this land of liberty, the most blessed and glorious upon which the sun shines, the law is swiftly invoked to punish religion, but justice goes limping and blindfolded in pursuit of crime.

Eventually, Cannon went "underground" with others in the church leadership as a fugitive from the federal authorities. In September 1888, Cannon surrendered himself and pleaded guilty at trial to charges of unlawful cohabitation under the Edmunds Act. As a result, Cannon served nearly six months in Utah's federal penitentiary.

In the string of events preceding the announcement of Wilford Woodruff in September, 1890 that the church would not sanction additional polygamist marriages, Cannon's son Frank shuttled communications relating to polygamy between the US Congress and his father.

Cannon was pardoned in 1894 by U.S. President Grover Cleveland.

== Death and descendants ==
Cannon died on April 12, 1901, in Monterey, California, at 74 years of age. Had he lived a few months longer, he would have become the President of the LDS Church: Lorenzo Snow died on October 10 of that year. Cannon was buried in the Salt Lake City Cemetery.

Cannon fathered 33 children, some of whom are Abraham H. Cannon, John Q. Cannon, and Sylvester Q. Cannon, who all became general authorities of the LDS Church; Frank J. Cannon, Utah's first U.S. Senator; and Lewis T. Cannon and Georgius Y. Cannon, prominent architects in Utah. Some of Cannon's prominent descendants include Howard Cannon, U.S. Senator from Nevada from 1959 to 1983 and Chris Cannon, a member of the U.S. House of Representatives from 1997 to 2009. Another descendant, George I. Cannon, became a general authority of the church.

At Brigham Young University football games, the BYU ROTC celebrates touchdowns by firing a cannon named "George Q" to honor him.

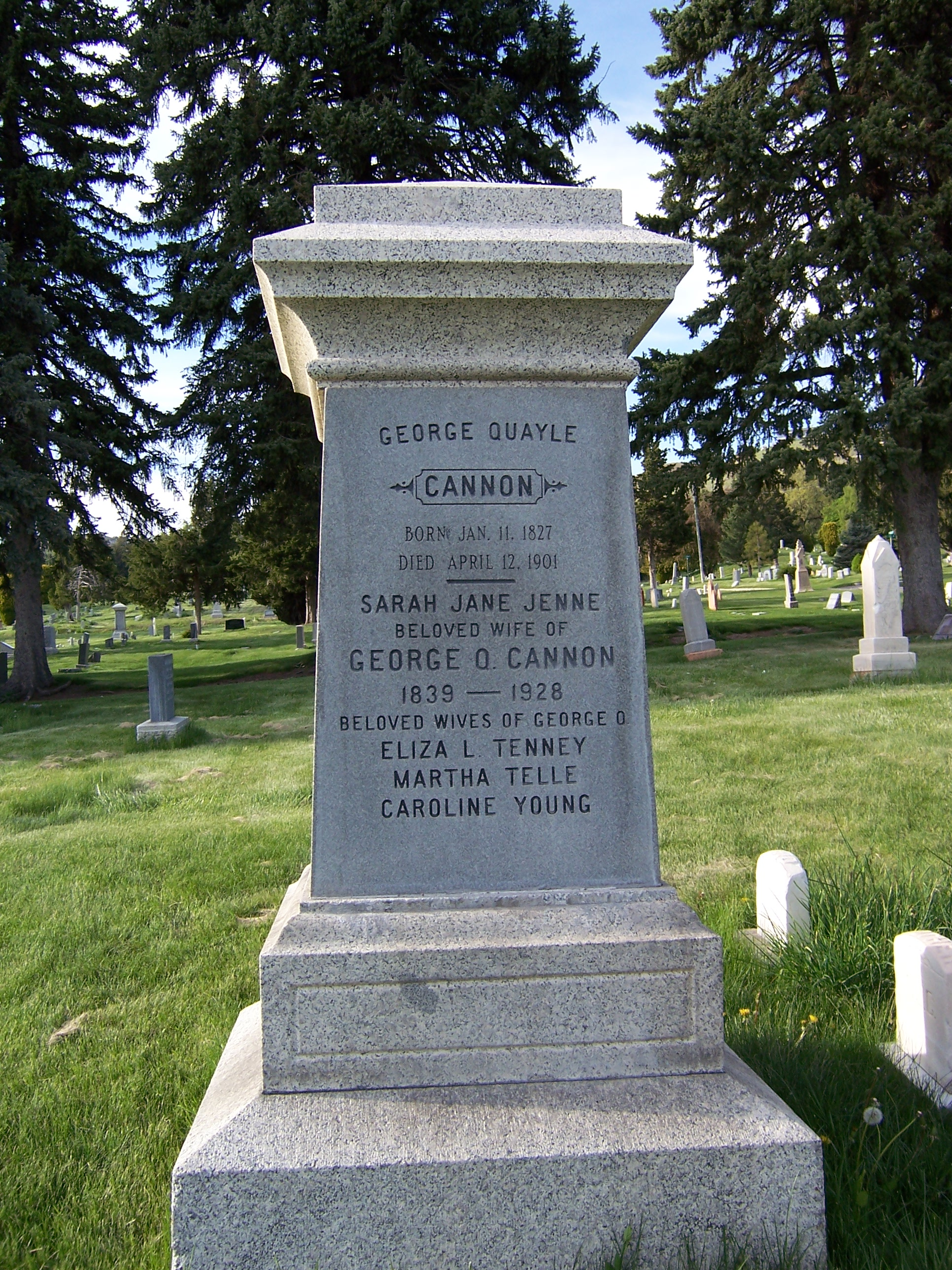
George Q. Cannon's grave marker

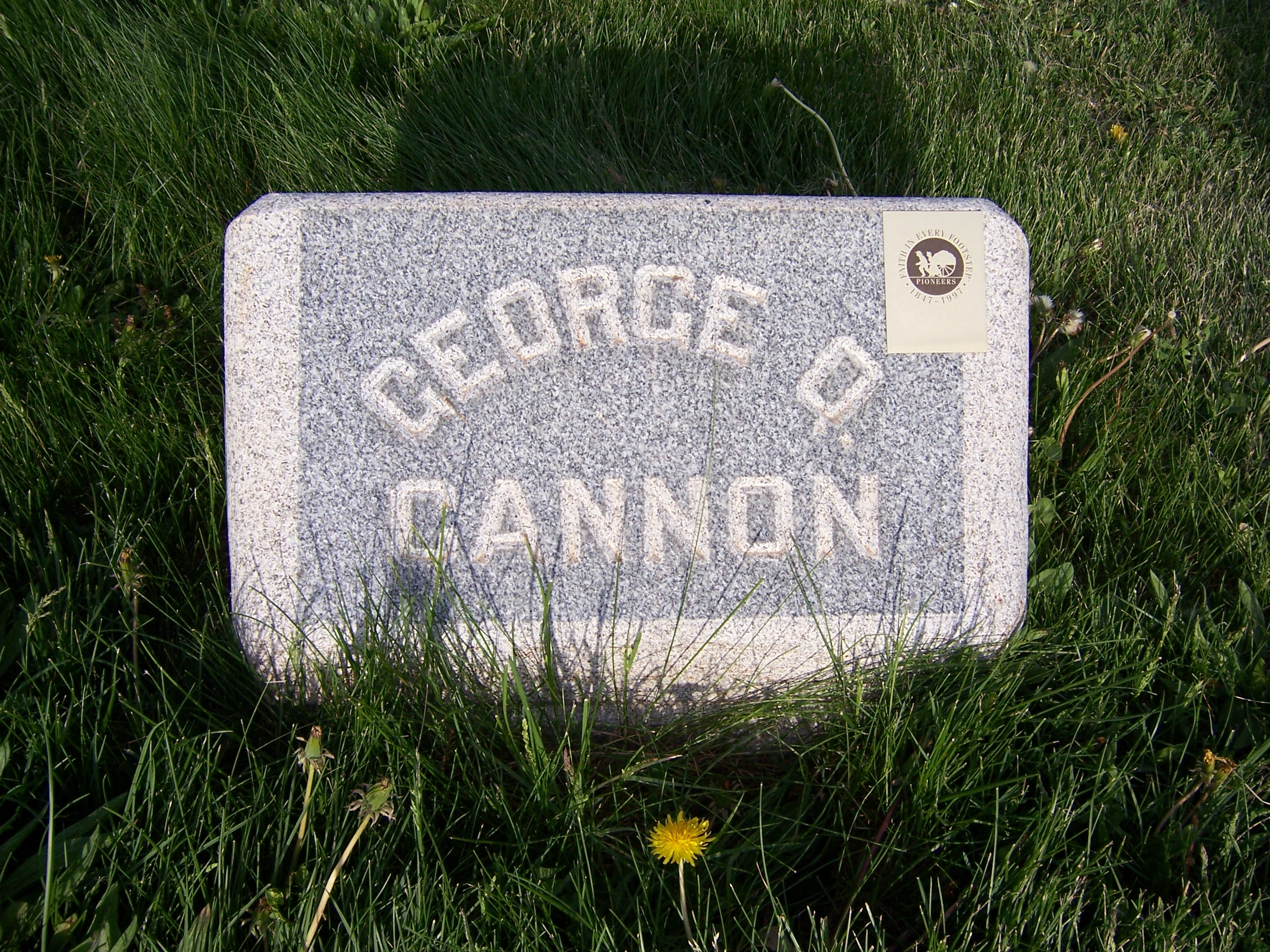
George Q. Cannon's headstone

== Legacy ==
- Georgetown, Idaho, a city in the Bear River Valley in Bear Lake County, Idaho, United States
- Cannonville, Utah, a town in the Paria River Valley in Garfield County, Utah, United States

== Published works ==
- Cannon, George Q. (1878). Discourse: Delivered in the New Tabernacle, Salt Lake City, Sunday morning, October 8, 1877. W. Budge. ASIN B00088KE9Q.
- Cannon, George Q. (1900) The Latter-Day Prophet: History of Joseph Smith Written for Young People
- Cannon, George Q. (1957). A history of the prophet Joseph Smith for young people. Deseret Book Company. ASIN B0007H18H0.
- Cannon, George Q. (1886). Life of Joseph Smith: The Prophet. Deseret Book Company. ISBN 0-87747-148-7.
- Cannon, George Q. (1883). The life of Nephi: The son of Lehi. Contributor Co. ASIN B00087BLX0.
- Cannon, George Q. (1882). My first mission. Juvenile instructor office. ASIN B00087OZEC.
- Cannon, George Q. (1876). Robt. N. Baskin, contestant, v. George Q. Cannon, contestee: Brief and argument of Charles A. Eldredge, counsel of contestee. Gibson Brothers, printers. ASIN B0008A1QZ0.
- Cannon, George Q. (1969). Writings from the Western standard. Paladin Press. ASIN B0006BZBL6.
- Newquist, Jerreld L., ed. (1974). Gospel truth: discourses and writings of president George Q. Cannon. Vol. 1. Deseret Book Company. ISBN 0-87747-519-9.
- Newquist, Jerreld L., ed. (1974). Gospel truth: discourses and writings of president George Q. Cannon. Vol. 2. Deseret Book Company. ISBN 0-87747-520-2.
- Turley, Richard E. Jr.; Cannon, Adrian; Landon, Michael, eds. (1999). The Journals of George Q. Cannon. Vol. 1. Deseret Book Company. ISBN 1-57345-465-6.
- Turley, Richard E. Jr. (2016). The Journal of George Q. Cannon. The Church Historian's Press. Online Publication.

== See also ==
- Deseret Book
- United States congressional delegates from Utah Territory
- List of federal political scandals in the United States
- Unseated members of the United States Congress

== Notes ==
U.S. House of Representatives
Preceded by William H. Hooper	Delegate to the U.S. House of Representatives from Utah Territory; 1873-1882	Succeeded by John T. Caine
The Church of Jesus Christ of Latter-day Saints titles
Preceded by John W. Young	First Counselor in the First Presidency; September 13, 1898 – April 21, 1901; April 7, 1889 – September 2, 1898; October 10, 1880 – July 25, 1887; Note: position was vacant between date	Succeeded by Joseph F. Smith
Preceded by Franklin D. Richards	Quorum of the Twelve Apostles; August 26, 1860 – 1873	Succeeded by Joseph F. Smith
