= Hawaiian Philatelic Society =

- Founded: 1911
- Type: not-for-profit organization
- Purpose: general philately
- Location: Honolulu, Hawaii
- Region served: Hawaii
- Method: slides shows, auctions, presentations
- Key people: Wayne Yakuma, President
- Revenue: Membership fees
- Website: Hawaiian Philatelic Society
- Publishes quarterly entitled PO'OLEKA O HAWAI'I

The Hawaiian Philatelic Society is an organization for stamp collectors to meet, exchange philatelic information, and auction their duplicate postage stamps. It is a branch of the American Philatelic Society and was established in 1911.

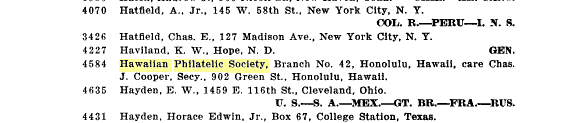
Hawaiian Philatelic Society, Branch No. 42 of the American Philatelic Society, as listed in The Philatelist in 1916

== Location ==
The society meets at 7 p.m. on the second Monday of the month at St. Louis Alumni Association Clubhouse located at 925 Isenberg Street, Moiliili, Honolulu. Membership forms are available on the society website.

== Meeting schedule ==
Each meeting includes a business session, followed by a slide presentation, program, or exhibit and an auction of about 125 lots. A Christmas party occurs on the second Monday of December.

== Journal ==
The society publishes a philatelic quarterly entitled Po'oleka O Hawai'i.

== Organization ==
The society is administered by a president, first and second vice presidents, secretary, treasurer, auctioneer, American Philatelic Society representative, and an expertizing committee chair. Board meetings are held on the fourth Monday of the month at 7 p.m.

== See also ==
- American Philatelic Society
- Hawaiian Missionaries
- Postage stamps and postal history of Hawaii
