= Lewis T. Cannon =

American architect

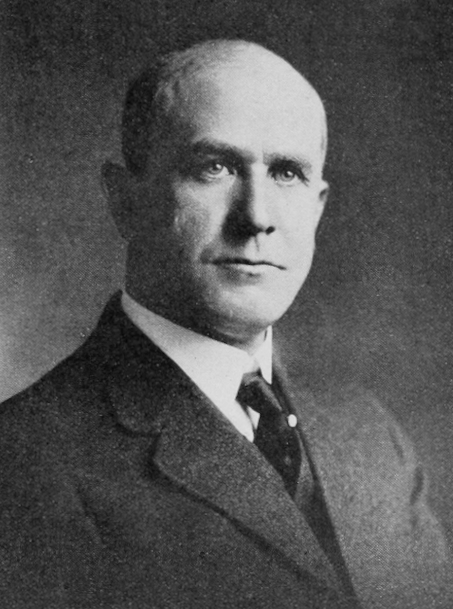
- Born: Lewis Telle Cannon; April 22, 1872; Salt Lake City, Utah, US
- Died: October 10, 1946 (aged 74); Salt Lake City, Utah, US
- Burial place: Salt Lake City Cemetery
- Education: Massachusetts Institute of Technology
- Occupation: Architect

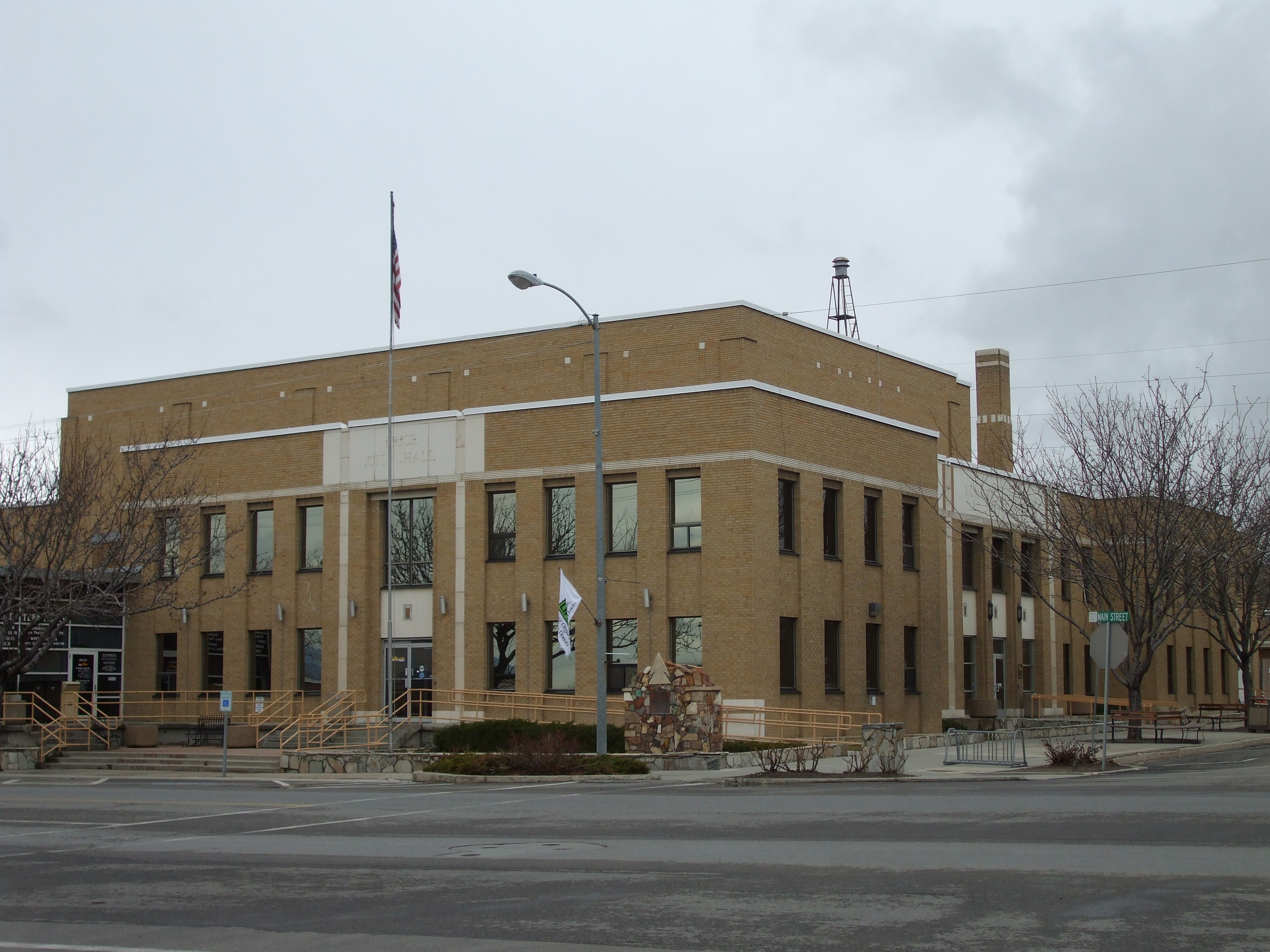
Price Municipal Building designed by Lewis T. Cannon and listed on the National Register of Historic Places

Lewis Telle Cannon (April 22, 1872 – October 10, 1946) was an early 20th-century architect in Salt Lake City, Utah who designed several buildings throughout the intermountain west. Cannon was trained at the Massachusetts Institute of Technology and after returning to Utah began a firm with Ramm Hansen for a brief time in 1908 and then another firm with John Fetzer (architect) named Cannon & Fetzer in 1909. Cannon & Fetzer existed until 1937 and produced civic buildings, meetinghouses, and residences, many of which remain and are listed on the National Register of Historic Places.

== Personal life ==
Lewis was born to the Church of Jesus Christ of Latter-day Saints leader George Q. Cannon and Martha Telle Cannon in Salt Lake City on April 22, 1872. Cannon was also a member of this Church. He was the half-brother to architect Georgius Y. Cannon. Lewis died October 10, 1946, in Salt Lake City, and was buried at Salt Lake City Cemetery.
