= Charles Guilloû =

American military physician (1813–1899)

- Born: July 13, 1813; Philadelphia, Pennsylvania, US
- Died: January 2, 1899 (aged 85) New York City, US
- Branch: United States Navy
- Service years: 1836–43, 1845–54
- Rank: Surgeon
- Service: United States Exploring Expedition; USS Columbus (diplomatic); USS Constitution (diplomatic)
- Other work: Hospital physician

Charles Fleury Bien-aimé Guilloû (July 14, 1813 – January 2, 1899) was an American military physician. He served on a major exploring expedition that included both scientific discoveries and controversy, and two historic diplomatic missions. He ran a hospital in the Hawaiian Islands, before returning to the US.

== Life ==
Guilloû was born in Philadelphia, on July 26, 1813. His father was Victor Gabriel Guilloû (1776–1841), who had escaped from the French Revolution and fought in the Haitian Revolution. His father introduced him to Marquis de Lafayette when he visited the US in 1824. Guilloû attended a military academy and then graduated from the University of Pennsylvania medical school in 1836. During 1836, he visited his father, who had moved to Cuba to start a sugar plantation after running a dance academy in Philadelphia.

=== Exploration ===
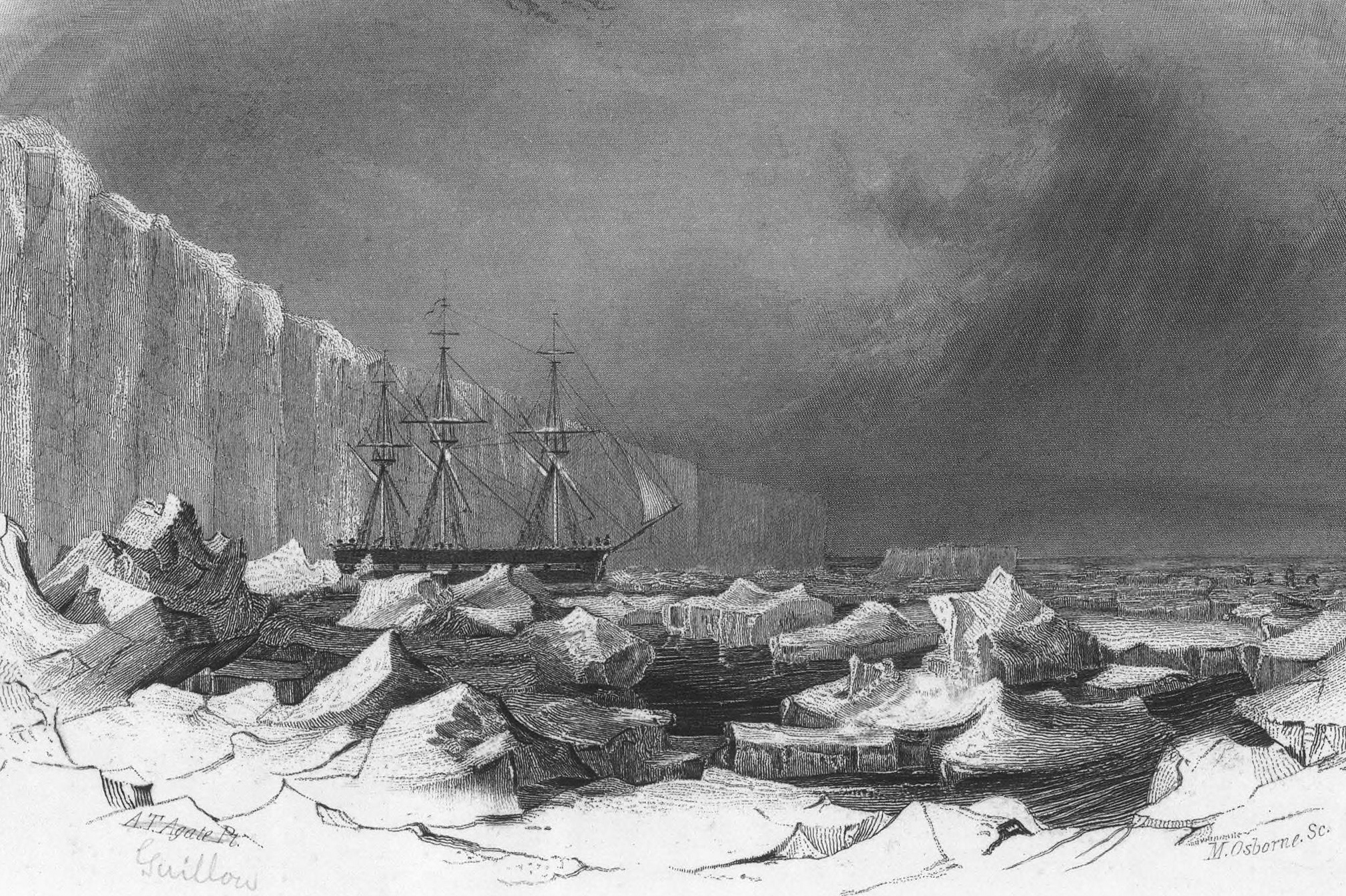
Peacock stuck in Antarctic ice

On February 9, 1837, Guilloû was appointed assistant surgeon for the USS Porpoise in the United States Navy. It was one of the ships sent on the United States Exploring Expedition commanded by Charles Wilkes, although it was 1838 before the squadron could depart. After a dispute with Cadwalader Ringgold, he was transferred to the USS Peacock. He befriended young midshipman William Reynolds, whose journals provide a non-official version of the events of the voyage. In December 1839, the squadron headed farther south, and in January 1840 provided the first sighting of the continent of Antarctica by a US Navy ship. Guilloû provided a sketch when the Peacock was stuck in the ice. They returned to Sydney for repairs, before resuming exploration.

Wilkes' imperious manner included dismissing many of the officers, leading to further low morale. Guilloû attended to sailors injured by frequent floggings. In September 1841, the squadron arrived in Honolulu in the Hawaiian Islands to spend the winter. The three-year planned time of the voyage was over, and several members requested to leave. Wilkes insisted on reading all journals and letters. When Guilloû removed some pages from his journal, saying they were of a personal nature, Wilkes suspended Guilloû and prepared charges for various offenses. After the Peacock was lost in July 1841 while exploring the Pacific Northwest, Guilloû was shuttled between various ships, officially under arrest.

On his return in 1842, Guilloû helped organize the Navy's Bureau of Medicine and Surgery under William P. C. Barton. He was sentenced to dismissal at the court-martial trials in 1843 related to the Wilkes expedition, but President John Tyler reduced the sentence to a year suspension. Guilloû filed seven charges against Wilkes, including questioning his claim to have "discovered" Antarctica. Wilkes was found guilty of only one: illegal punishment. Wilkes was sentenced to a public reprimand.

=== Diplomacy ===
After being reinstated, Guilloû served on the USS Columbus, under Commodore James Biddle. In June 1845 the ship was sent to Guangzhou (then known as Canton), on a diplomatic mission with the first treaty between the US and China. It then visited Japan. When returning via Honolulu, at the outbreak of the Mexican–American War, the Columbus was recalled to Monterey, California and the ranch of William A. Richardson. Guilloû met John Sutter, and spoke French with the Swiss native on July 4, 1847; a year later the discovery of gold near Sutter's mill sparked the California Gold Rush. On August 28, 1847, he was promoted to the rank of full Navy Surgeon. The Columbus returned to Hampton Roads in March 1848.

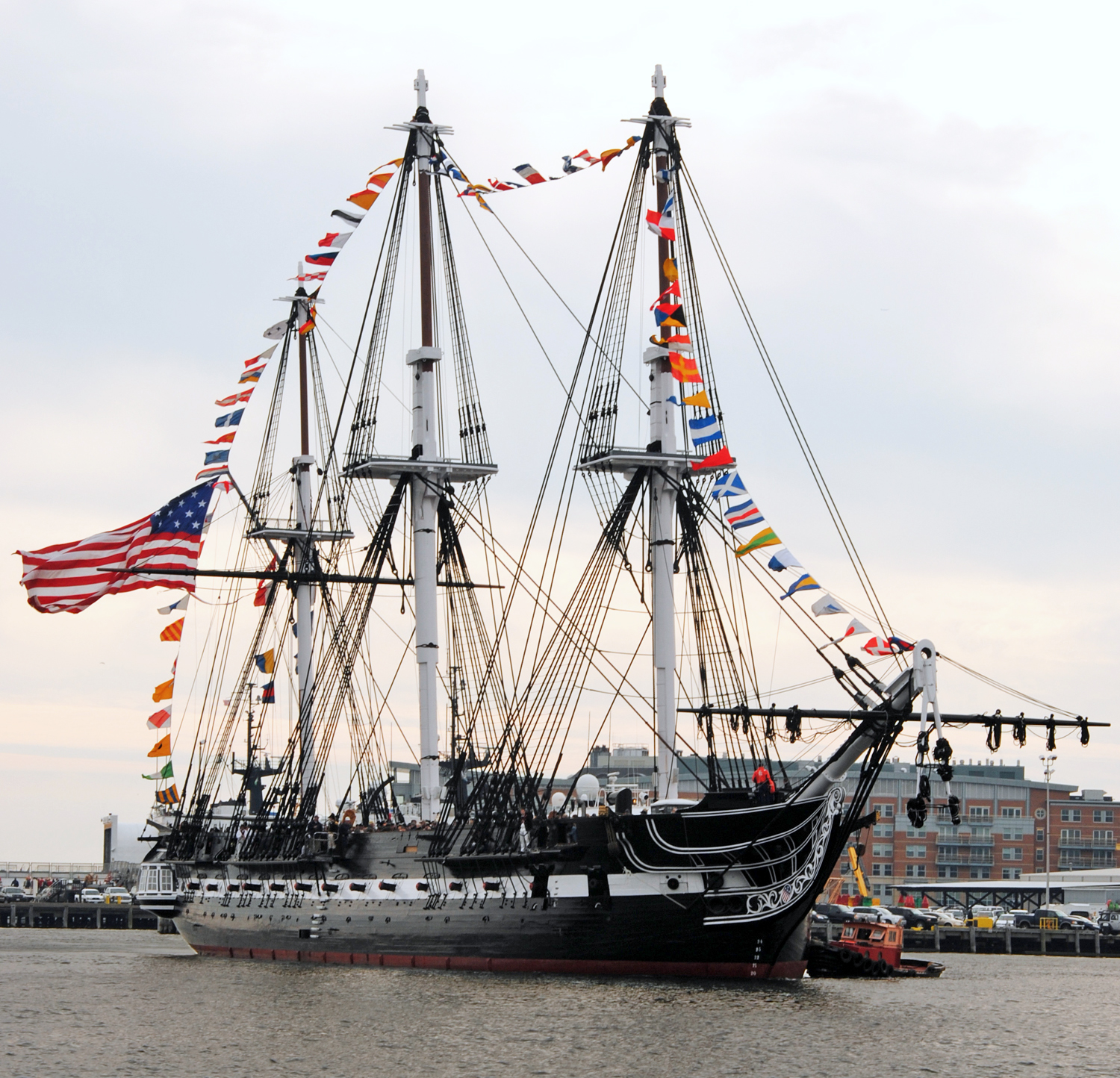
USS Constitution as restored

Guilloû was then assigned to the USS Constitution which took another diplomatic trip, this one to Europe. On July 30, 1849, while at Gaeta, the multilingual Guilloû acted as interpreter for a visit to the palace of King Ferdinand II by local diplomat John Rowan. They also met Cardinal Giacomo Antonelli, who was secretary of state for the Papal States. On July 31, they visited Pope Pius IX, and invited him and Ferdinand to visit the ship, with Guilloû again interpreting.

On August 1, Ferdinand and Pius had their formal visit to the Constitution. Pius began to feel ill, and Guilloû treated him for seasickness. The grateful pope delivered rosaries to the Catholics on the ship; Guilloû received inscribed prayerbooks and a medallion, along with a plenary indulgence. The visit, however, proved to be a diplomatic embarrassment for the US, which was officially neutral in the Italian revolutions that were happening at the time. A visit to a navy ship was considered equivalent to stepping on "US territory", which had never been done before by a pope. Captain John Gwinn died before he could be formally reprimanded.

On his return, Guilloû was stationed at the Brooklyn Naval Shipyard from 1852 to 1854. He married Dinah Postlethwaite (1815–85), daughter of Samuel Postlethwaite (1772–1824) from Natchez, Mississippi in September 1852. They had one daughter, Margaret Acelie Guilloû (born September 13, 1853), who married George Alfred Blackmore. They also adopted Eloise ("Polly") Thibault.

=== Hawaii ===
Guilloû sailed to Honolulu in 1854. He first tried to establish a hospital with Robert W. Wood, but that failed. Active in Freemasonry, he helped reactivate Lodge Le Progrés de l'Océanie in Honolulu that had been chartered from the French organization.

He was an early member of the Hawaiian Agricultural Society. He evidently decided to stick to medicine, since in 1856, he was one of the founding members of the Hawaiian Medical Society, with other prominent doctors such as Gerrit P. Judd and Thomas Charles Byde Rooke.

In 1857, Darius A. Ogden, the American Consul to the Kingdom of Hawaii, appointed him as the Honolulu U.S. Seamen's Hospital physician in 1857.

On April 23, 1858, he gave a speech proposing to improve health care for native Hawaiians by opening a hospital. Although the plan would later be adopted, the resulting Queen's Hospital (now The Queen's Medical Center) passed up Guilloû and appointed German William Hillebrand to head the new institution. Guilloû was appointed by Victor Emmanuel II of Italy as the Consul of Italy to the Kingdom of Hawaii while he was there.

The State Department suspected overcharging for the seaman's hospital. Commander William E. Hunt in of the USS Levant was sent to investigate. James W. Borden, the new United States Minister to Hawaii, published letters in the Pacific Commercial Advertiser newspaper of Henry Martyn Whitney with accusations against Guilloû and Abner Pratt, the American Consul who replaced Ogden.

Pratt had already headed back to Marshall, Michigan where he built a majestic mansion, while the Levant was lost at sea. Although Pratt was asked to return the funds, the American Civil War caused the government to never pursue the case. By 1861, the Seamen's Hospital was run by Seth Porter Ford (1817–1866).

Young Prince Albert Edward Kauikeaouli Kaleiopapa became ill in August 1862. Guilloû was one of many physicians called in to help, but they could do nothing and the young prince died, leading to a series of succession crises. He returned to the US in 1867. He lived for a while in Petersburg, Virginia, and then New York City.

== Death and legacy ==
Guilloû died on January 2, 1899, aged 85, in New York City, of pneumonia.

He wrote a book of his reminiscences (never published), and took many sketches during his travels. His sketches of Oregon and California were published in 1961.
