= Ryohei Ishikawa =

Japanese banker and philatelist (born 1927)

- Born: July 27, 1927; Kanagawa Prefecture, Japan
- Occupation: Banker
- Known for: Collection of U.S. postage stamps
- Board member of: Chubu Bank, Teisan Group

Ryohei Ishikawa (born July 27, 1927) is a Japanese banker, the former chairman of Chubu Bank and the Teisan Group. He is a philatelist specialising in the stamps and postal history of the United States, Hawaii, and Hong Kong.

== Early life ==
Ryohei Ishikawa was born on July 27, 1927.

== Career ==
Ishikawa is a banker and the former chairman of Chubu Bank and the Teisan Group.

== Philately ==
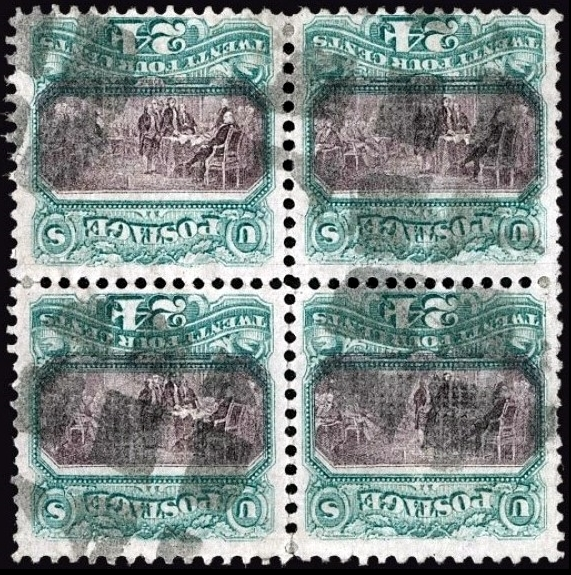
The block of four of the 1869 24c United States stamps with inverted centre once owned by Ishikawa (shown inverted).

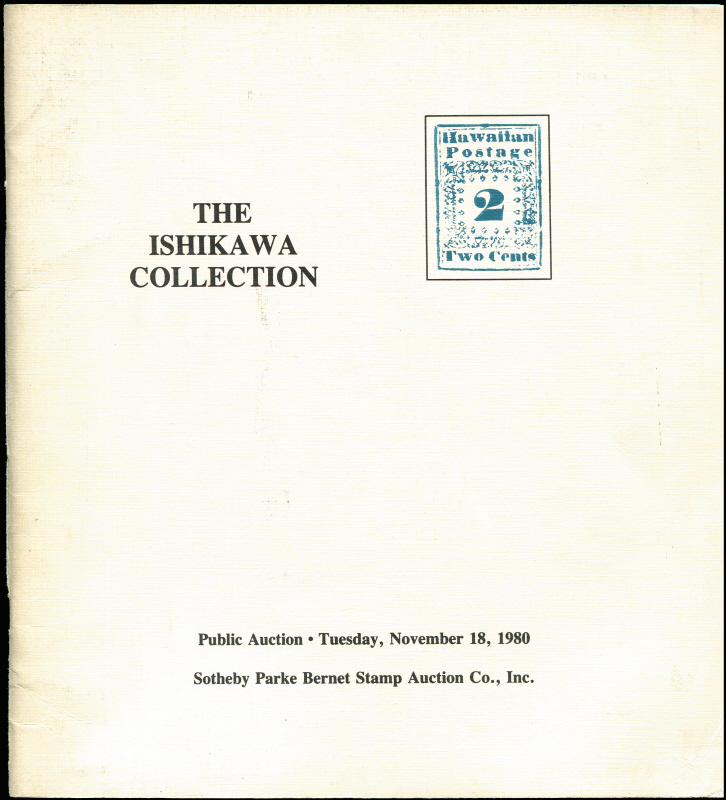
Catalogue for sale of The Ishikawa Collection of stamps and postal history of the Hawaiian Islands, Sotheby's, 1980.

Ishikawa was briefly a stamp collector as a child. His interest was rekindled in 1970 when his mother gave him some old albums she had found in the family home. He decided to specialise in United States stamps after reading Stanley B. Ashbrook's The United States One Cent Stamp of 1851-1857 (1938) and subsequently formed a leading collection of that issue, moving on to other classic U.S. stamps.

In addition, Ishikawa has formed leading and award-winning collections of the stamps and postal history of Hawaii, Hong Kong, and foreign post offices in Japan. His U.S. collection included all the stamps issued from 1847 to 1869 as well as items such as the unique block of four of the 1869 24c stamps of the United States with an inverted center that had once been in the collection of William Thorne. The collection was sold for $9.5 million at Christie's, New York, in 1993.

== Selected publications ==
=== Auctions ===
- The Ryohei Ishikawa Collection of The Postage Stamps and Postal History of the Hawaiian Islands. Sotheby Parke Bernet, New York, 1980.
- The Ryohei Ishikawa Collection: Postage Stamps and Postal History of Hong Kong and Treaty Ports. December 4th and 5th 1980. Sotheby Parke Bernet, London, 1980.
- The Ryohei Ishikawa Collection: Foreign Post Offices in Japan 7th July 1981. Sotheby Parke Bernet, London, 1981.
- The Ryohei Ishikawa Collection: United States Stamps and Covers 1847-1869 New York Tuesday, September 28 and Wednesday, September 29, 1993. Christie's, New York, 1993.

=== Books ===
- The Forerunner Foreign Post Offices in Japan. British-U.S.-French. Ryohei Ishikawa's Collection. Japan Philatelic Publications, Tokyo, 1976.
