= William P. Ragsdale =

Hawaiian lawyer, editor and translator (c. 1837–1877)

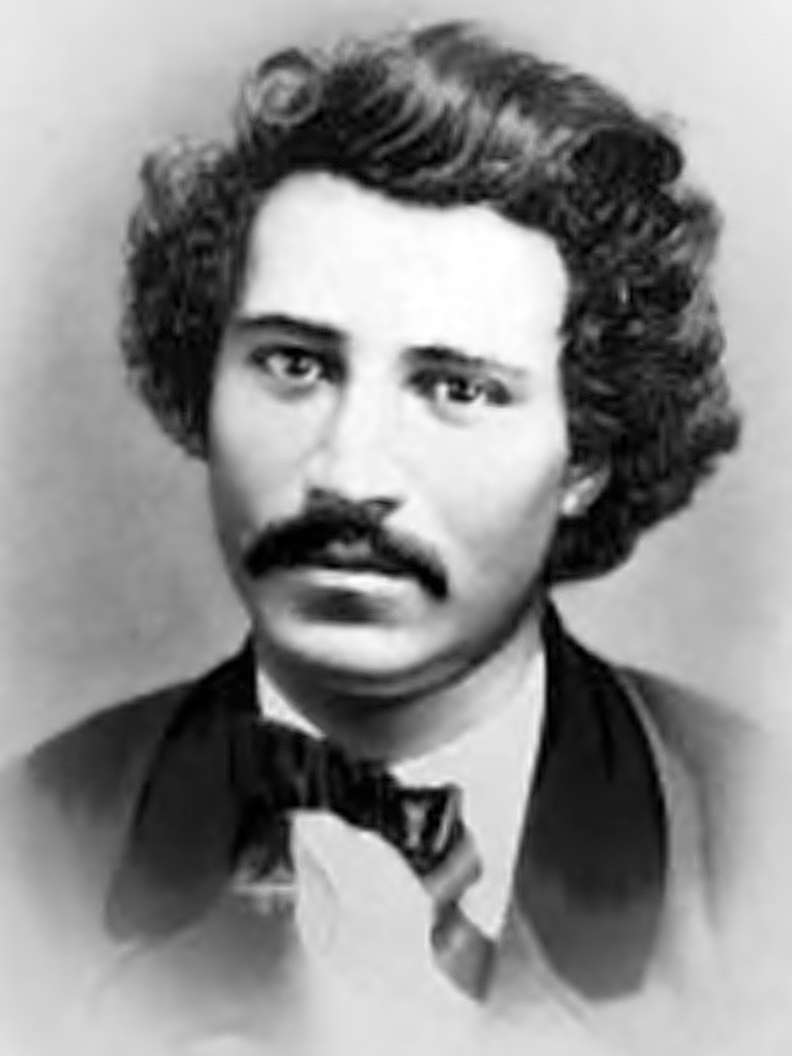
- William Ragsdale, before he was diagnosed with leprosy and exiled to Kalaupapa
- Born: c. 1837
- Died: November 24, 1877 (aged 40); Kalaupapa, Molokai
- Occupations: lawyer, newspaper editor, government translator, resident superintendent of Kalaupapa Leprosy Settlement
- Parent(s): Alexander Ragsdale and Kahawaluokalani

William Phileppus Ragsdale (Note: He was commonly called Bill Ragsdale or by his Hawaiianized name Pila or Bila. His name was also given as Bila Auwana.) (c. 1837 – November 24, 1877) was a Hawaiian lawyer, newspaper editor, and translator. He was a popular figure known for being luna or superintendent of the Kalaupapa Leprosy Settlement. Elements of his life story influenced Mark Twain's 1889 novel A Connecticut Yankee in King Arthur's Court.

== Early life and career ==
Ragsdale was born in c. 1837, a hapa-haole or half-Hawaiian, half-Caucasian. His father Alexander Ragsdale was an American plantation owner originally from Virginia who had settled in Hawaii in 1817 and married Kahawaluokalani (Kahawalu), a minor Hawaiian chiefess and a descendant of King Kekaulike of Maui and his wife Kahawalu. His siblings were Edward Alexander Ragsdale (1839–1863) and Annie Green Ragsdale Dowsett (1842–1891), who married James Isaac Dowsett. He was considered a distant relative or cousin of Queen Emma.

From 1861 to 1865, Ragsdale served as the first editor of Ka Nupepa Kūʻokoʻa ("The Independent Newspaper") for publisher Henry Martyn Whitney. After four years, he was replaced by missionary Luther Halsey Gulick, Sr. in 1865. His Roman Catholic faith was a probable reason why he was replaced, since the Hawaiian Congregationalists wished to have a newspaper more favorable to them. In 1866, Ragsdale was working as a government translator and interpreter for the Hawaiian legislature. American writer Mark Twain visited the island kingdom at the time and described the legislative session and Ragsdale:

Bill Ragsdale stands up in front of the Speaker's pulpit, with his back against it, and fastens his quick black eye upon any member who rises, lets him say half a dozen sentences and then interrupts him, and repeats his speech in a loud, rapid voice, turning every Kanaka speech into English and every English speech into Kanaka, with a readiness and felicity of language that are remarkable – waits for another installment of talk from the member's lips and goes on with his translation as before. His tongue is in constant motion from 11 in the forenoon till four in the afternoon, and why it does not wear out is the affair of Providence, not mine. There is a spice of deviltry in the fellow's nature and it crops out every now and then when he is translating the speeches of slow old Kanakas who do not understand English. Without departing from the spirit of a member's remarks, he will, with apparent unconsciousness, drop in a little voluntary contribution occasionally in the way of a word or two that will make the gravest speech utterly ridiculous. He is careful not to venture upon such experiments, though, with the remarks of persons able to detect him. I noticed when he translated for His Excellency David Kalakaua, who is an accomplished English scholar, he asked, "Did I translate you correctly, your Excellency?" or something to that effect. The rascal.

== Superintendent of Kalaupapa ==
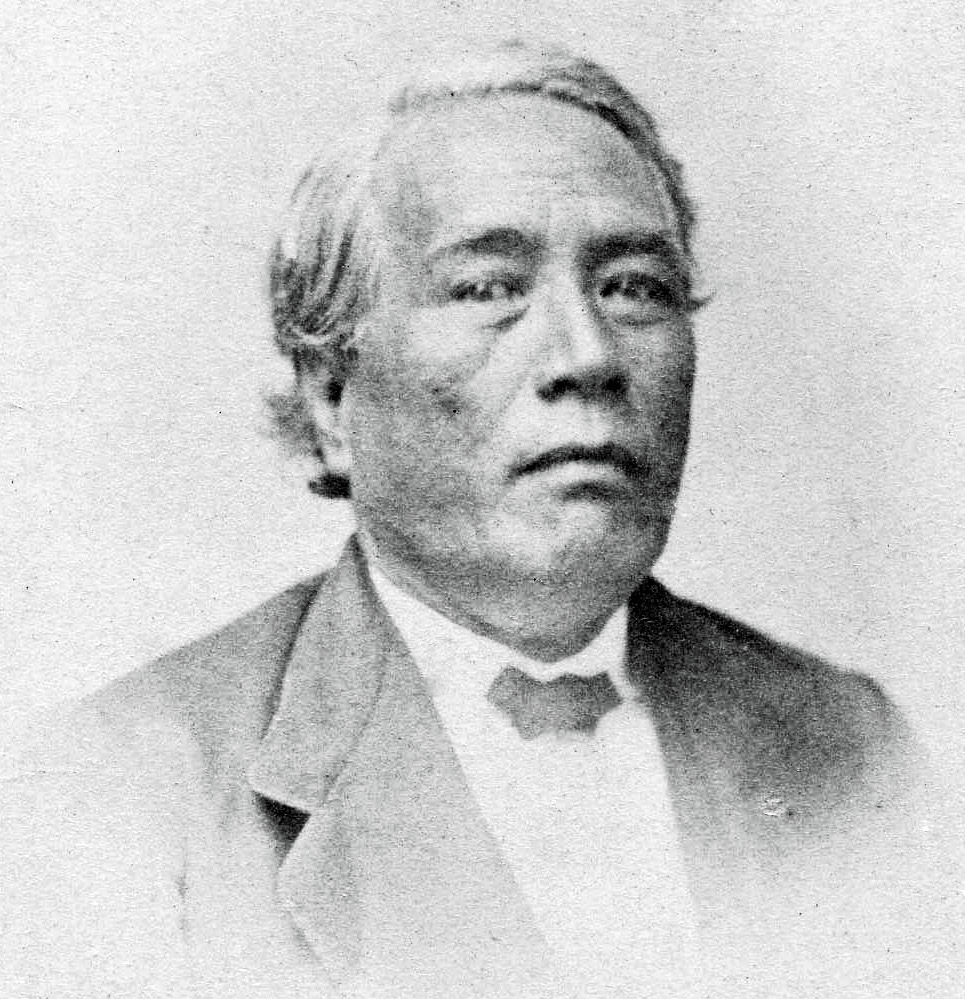
Ragsdale replaced Jonatana Napela as superintendent of Kalaupapa.

In early 1873, Ragsdale was practicing law in Hilo when he contracted leprosy. Working late one night, he accidentally knocked over an oil lamp and discovered that he felt no pain in his hands when he caught it before it fell. After the realization, Ragsdale contemplated his choices for a few months, then surrendered himself to the local authority in hope that others would be encouraged to do the same. He was sent to Kalihi Hospital in Honolulu where he was officially diagnosed with leprosy, and sent to the leper settlement at Kalaupapa, on the island of Molokai. Ragsdale arrived at Kalaupapa on June 29, 1873.

Upon his arrival in the settlement, he worked as a translator and wrote letters to the government in Honolulu and the Board of Health complaining about the negligence of the incumbent luna (superintendent) Jonatana Napela in enforcing the Board's demands for rigid segregation of lepers and non-lepers in the settlement. He served as a mediator between the Board and the inmates, and assisted in improving the discipline and economy of the settlement. These actions gained him favors back in Honolulu. In October 1873, Napela was discharged by the Board, and Ragsdale was promoted to the position of luna of Kalaupapa. He was referred to as "Governor", and later posthumous accounts called him "King of the Lepers".

Ragsdale's restrictive policies and the limited resources provided by the Hawaiian government angered many of the patients. Peter Kaʻeo, a high-born chief and patient of the settlement, wrote that "since [Ragsdale] has been Luna he has made more Enemyes and less friends". In Honolulu, the government and press were much more supportive of his policies, with The Pacific Commercial Advertiser stating that "Ragsdale guides and regulates his little principality in most matters of government, quite as absolutely and undisputedly as the captain of a ship whose word is law". Except for a few confrontations with disgruntled patients, Ragsdale's tenure as luna remained relatively peaceful until his final illness.

== Death and legacy ==
In the fall of 1877, Ragsdale's condition worsened, and he died on November 24, 1877. Ragsdale was buried in an unmarked grave in the cemetery grounds of Saint Philomena Catholic Church, founded by Father Damien. He was mourned at home and abroad, with newspapers in Hawaii and the United States reporting on his death. Even The New York Times ran a story on the death of the "King of the Lepers". His obituary in Honoulu's The Pacific Commercial Advertiser noted:

The Board of Health,—indeed the Hawaiian government,—has sustained a severe loss in the demise of Ragsdale, who ably and conscientiously governed the leper colony for several years past. We had occasion to note this fact on our visit to Kalawao some three years since. Who will supply his place? is the anxious inquiry of all who take an interest in these matters. Who among the unfortunates there has the ability, the industry, the energy, the intelligence, and love of country displayed by William P. Ragsdale?

Father Damien (who had been at Kalaupapa as long as Ragsdale) was chosen briefly to replace him, but his unpopularity with the Protestant patients led to his being replaced by William Keolaloa Sumner, who had served as an assistant under Ragsdale.

His friend Mark Twain later wrote a draft to fictional story based on Ragsdale's life which was never finished, although elements of the story were incorporated into Twain's A Connecticut Yankee in King Arthur's Court.

== Bibliography ==
Books and journals

- Bird, Isabella Lucy (1875). The Hawaiian Archipelago: Six Months Among the Palm Groves, Coral Reefs, & Volcanoes of the Sandwich Islands. London: John Murray. ISBN 9780804811125. OCLC 10603880.
- Kaeo, Peter; Queen Emma (1976). Korn, Alfons L. (ed.). News from Molokai, Letters Between Peter Kaeo & Queen Emma, 1873–1876. Honolulu: The University Press of Hawaii. hdl:10125/39980. ISBN 978-0-8248-0399-5. OCLC 2225064.
- Krout, Mary Hannah (1900). Alice's Visit to the Hawaiian Islands. New York: American Book Company. OCLC 14977560.
- Moblo, Pennie (June 1999). "Ethnic Intercession: Leadership at the Kalaupapa Leprosy Colony". Pacific Studies. 22 (2). Laie, HI: Brigham Young University: 27–69. OCLC 882697672.
- Putney, Clifford (2003). "God vs. Sugar: the Gulick Brothers' Fight Against King Kamehameha V and the Sugar Planters in Hawaiʻi, 1864–1870". The Hawaiian Journal of History. 37. Honolulu: Hawaiian Historical Society: 63–89. hdl:10524/368. OCLC 60626541.
- Ragsdales of America. South Pasadena, CA: Nona Williams. 1992. OCLC 866048350.
- Tayman, John (2010). The Colony: The Harrowing True Story of the Exiles of Molokai. New York: Simon and Schuster. ISBN 978-1-4165-5192-8. OCLC 865230373.
- Twain, Mark; Day, Arthur Grove (1975). Mark Twain's Letters from Hawaii. Honolulu: University of Hawaii Press. ISBN 978-0-8248-0288-2. OCLC 1121242.

Newspapers and online sources

- "Death of the King of the Lepers" (PDF). The New York Times. New York. January 27, 1878.
- "Death of Noted Hawaiians". The Pacific Commercial Advertiser. Vol. XXII, no. 23. Honolulu. December 8, 1877. p. 3.
- "Mai Lawe i ke Kanawai iloko o ka Lima". Ke Alakai O Hawaii. Buke 1 (Helu 43): 4. October 27, 1888.
- Kanepuu, J. H. (February 2, 1878). "Ahe! He Nupepa Hou Ka!!". Ko Hawaii Pae Aina. Vol. Buke 1, no. Helu 5. p. 1.
