= Fifth Ward Meetinghouse =

Historic building in Salt Lake City, Utah, U.S.

- U.S. National Register of Historic Places
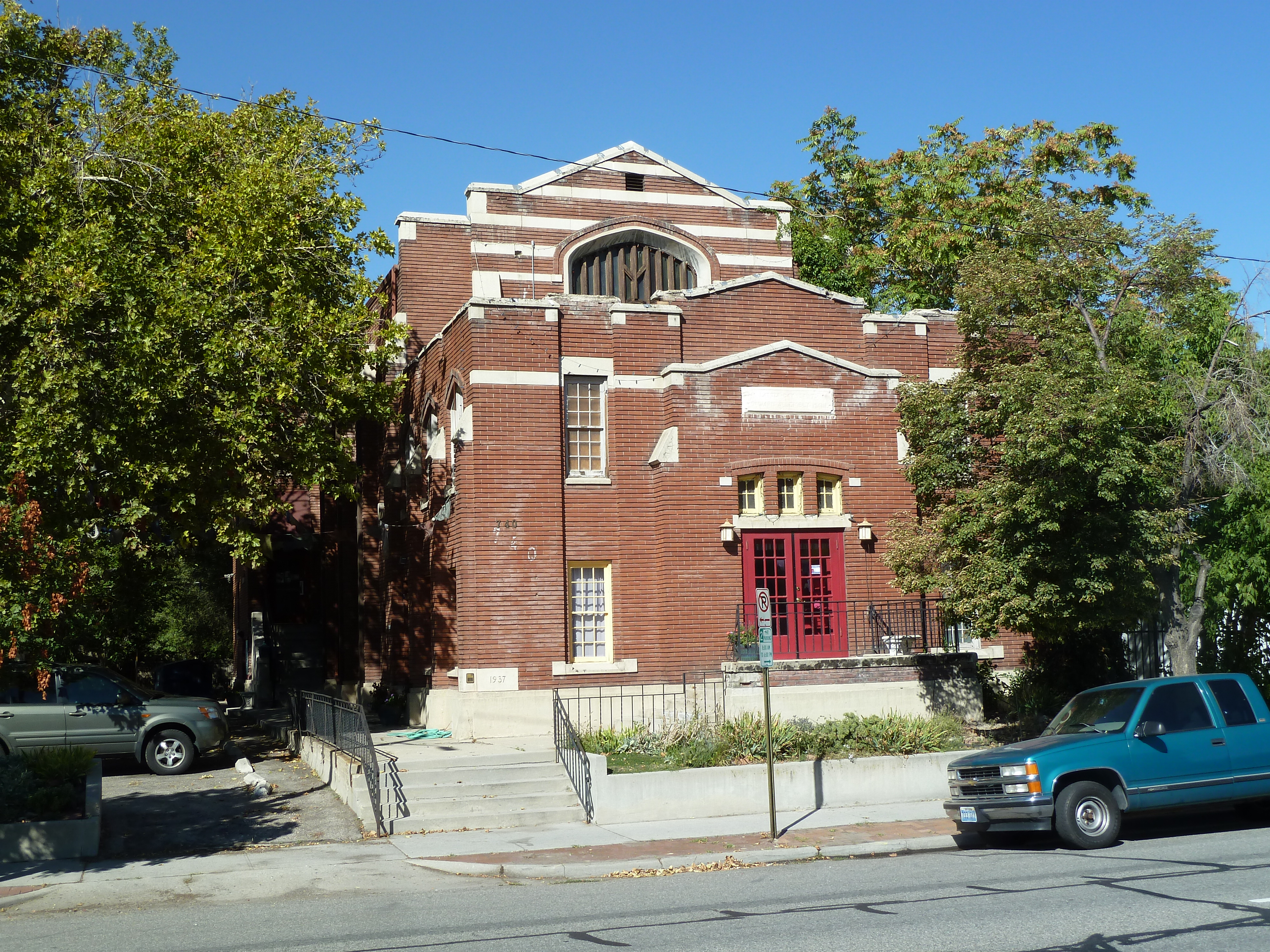

- Location within Utah Location within the United States
- Location: 740 S. 300 West, Salt Lake City, Utah
- Coordinates: 40°46′50″N 111°54′25″W
- Area: 0.48 acres (0.19 ha)
- Built: 1910
- Architect: Cannon & Fetzer
- Architectural style: Late Gothic Revival, Tudor Gothic
- NRHP reference No.: 78002670
- Added to NRHP: December 8, 1978

The Fifth Ward Meetinghouse is a historic structure in Salt Lake City, Utah. The 1910 building was designed by architects Cannon & Fetzer and remodeled in 1937; it was listed on the National Register of Historic Places in 1978. There was a historic marker on the building. It was also an official Salt Lake City Landmark site. The building was constructed to be and functioned as meetinghouse for the Church of Jesus Christ of Latter-day Saints until 1975.

After its sale by the church it went through several uses, including as concert venue The Pompadour in the 1990s, hosting bands such as Nirvana. It was also used as the Urgyen Samten Ling Gonpa Tibetan temple on the main floor and the Red Lotus School of Movement in the basement.

The building was severely damaged in an illegal demolition on the morning of Easter, March 31, 2024. When alerted, the city immediately posted a Stop Work Order at the site, issued to owner Jordan Atkin. City codes dictate that an owner must restore the portion of the building already demolished due to its historic significance.
