= Jonatana Napela =

American Mormon leader (1813–1879)

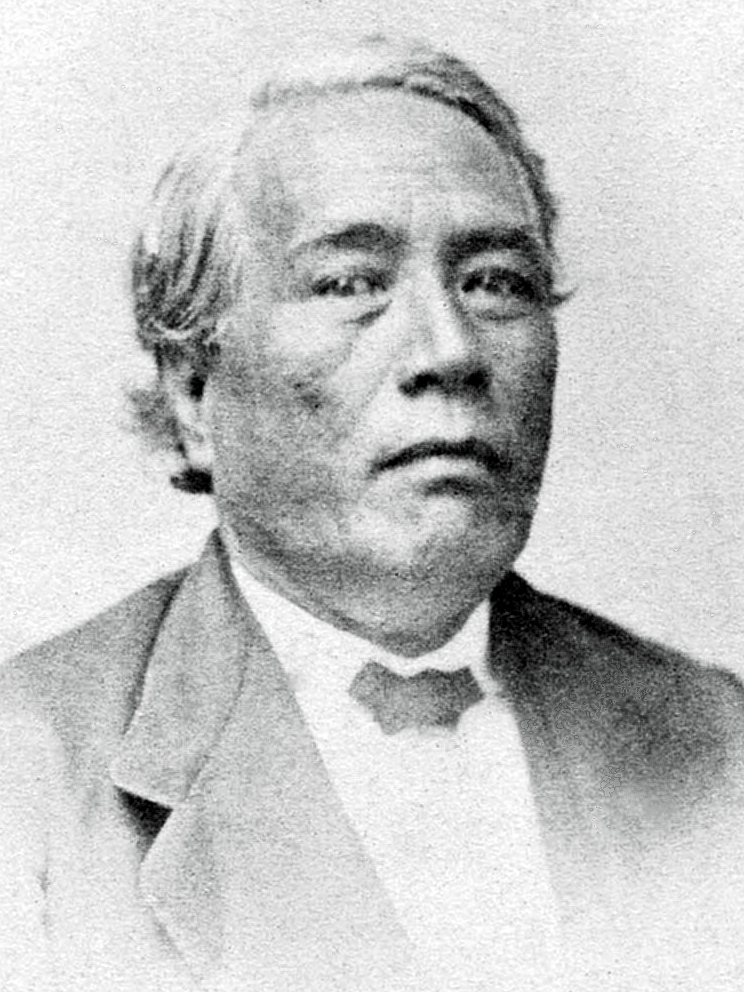
- 1869 in Salt Lake City
- Born: September 11, 1813
- Died: August 6, 1879 (aged 65)
- Spouse: Catherine "Kitty" Keliʻikuaʻāina Richardson
- Children: Harriet Panana Kaiwaokalani Napela Parker
- Parent(s): Wiwiokalani; Hawaiʻiwaaole
- Relatives: Samuel Parker (son-in-law)

Jonatana Napela or Jonathan Hawaii Napela (first name also spelled Iohatana, full name Napelakapuonamahanaonaleleonalani) (September 11, 1813 – August 6, 1879) was one of the earliest Hawaiian converts to the Church of Jesus Christ of Latter-day Saints (LDS Church) in Hawaii, joining in 1851. He helped translate the Book of Mormon into the Hawaiian language, as "Ka Buke a Moramona," working with missionary George Q. Cannon. Napela was appointed to serve as a superintendent of the colony at Kalaupapa, Molokaʻi, which he did for several years. He had accompanied his wife there after her diagnosis with leprosy. While at the settlement, he led LDS Church members and collaborated with Roman Catholic priest-missionary, Father Damien, to serve all the people of the settlement, most of which were Protestant.

== Life ==
Napela was born September 11, 1813, to Hawaiʻiwaaole and Wiwiokalani; his father descends from Kuahaliulani, one of the numerous sons of Kekaulike, king of Maui at the beginning of the 18th century. He was educated at Lahainaluna School.

Napela was trained as a lawyer. He was serving as a judge in Wailuku, Hawaii, when he met George Q. Cannon, a British-born American member of the LDS Church who was on a mission to Hawaiʻi. After Napela's conversion to the LDS Church in 1851, the government forced the judge to resign from his position, since the church was regarded with suspicion.

LDS Church historian, Andrew Jensen, said that Napela "did splendid missionary work for the Church." Napela was sent on a specific mission in 1853 but, as was common in the early church, spent much of his time before that preaching the gospel. His faith inspired others. On one occasion, Cannon and other American elders had prayed for good weather but, thinking the weather would be poor, walked to hold the meeting in a building. Napela, who had been present at the prayers, expressed surprise at their lack of faith; they followed his lead and held the meeting in a grove of trees.

Later, Cannon returned to Hawaiʻi to consult with natives on translating the Book of Mormon from English into the Hawaiian language. Beginning in January 1853, he worked with Napela on the translation, with Cannon first rendering the text of a few pages into Hawaiian. Then he would discuss the meaning of the pages with Napela. Then Cannon would ask Napela to explain the meaning of the translation to ensure the sense was being expressed.

Napela was a vigorous preacher for the LDS Church in the islands. In 1857, as Johnston's Army approached Utah, all American missionaries were recalled from Hawaii. A few years later, Walter M. Gibson came to Hawaii after having been appointed a missionary to Asia by Brigham Young. Gibson misrepresented the nature of his call to the Hawaiians, told them the church in Utah had been destroyed, and set himself up as the head of the church. He appointed Napaela as one of the members of his Quorum of the Twelve Apostles, with Napela serving as quorum president for two years. When Ezra T. Benson, Lorenzo Snow, Joseph F. Smith, William Cluff, and Alma Smith traveled to Hawaii to excommunicate Gibson and put the church back in order, Napela was persuaded to abandon Gibson and return to the fold of the church. In 1866, Napela traveled to Salt Lake City, where he met many other church leaders and members. A short time later, at a conference in HawaiʻI, Napela stated to the assembled members of the church that "We were deceived and led away by Gibson's cunning words and thereby have broken the sacred covenants we had made. But we are now undecieved; therefore, let us renew our covenants and be faithful."

In 1873, Napela's wife, Catherine "Kitty" Keliʻikuaʻāina Richardson, was diagnosed with leprosy. Under laws of the period requiring quarantine of persons with leprosy, she had to relocate to the settlement of the Kalaupapa Leper Colony on Molokai and he accompanied her. His wife was the only mixed-race woman of partial European descent admitted to the colony that year, with most residents being full-blooded Hawaiians.

Napela was appointed that year by the Board of Health as superintendent of the leper colony. He replaced Louis Lepart who had been driven out by a mob at the settlement.

Napela ran into trouble for failing to enforce the Board's demands for rigid segregation of lepers and non-lepers in the settlement and was replaced by William P. Ragsdale. For the rest of his life, he administered to members of the LDS Church at the colony. He died of leprosy on August 6, 1879.

== Legacy and honors ==
- The Hawaiian Studies Center at Brigham Young University–Hawaii is named after Napela.
- In 2010, the Roman Catholic Church presented the Polynesian Cultural Center with a plaque commemorating Napelaʻs collaboration with Saint Damien, a well-known Belgian-born priest and missionary at the Kalaupapa settlement. They cooperated to serve the people of the settlement.
