= Idaho Republican Building =

- U.S. National Register of Historic Places
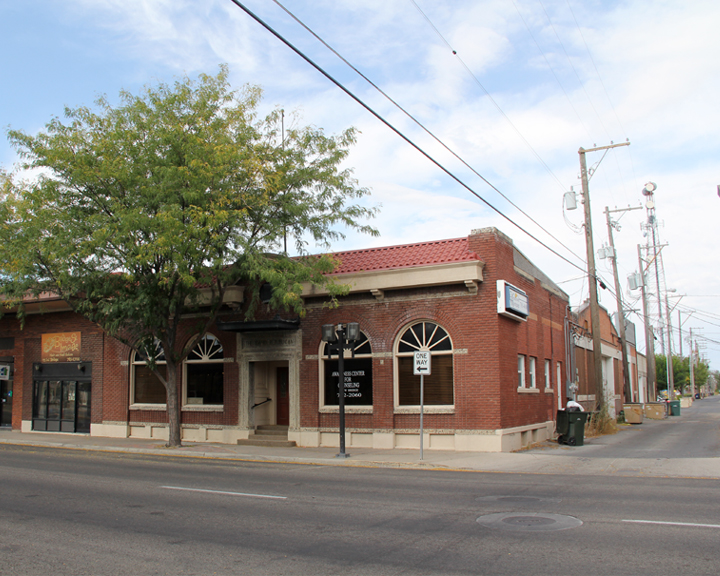

- Location within Idaho Location within the United States
- Location: 167 W. Bridge St., Blackfoot, Idaho
- Coordinates: 43°11′24″N 112°20′44″W
- Area: less than one acre
- Built: 1916
- Built by: Dahle & Eccles
- Architect: Cannon & Fetzer
- Architectural style: Late 19th and 20th Century Revivals, Mission/Spanish Revival
- NRHP reference No.: 79000776
- Added to NRHP: October 16, 1979

The Idaho Republican Building, at 167 W. Bridge St. in Blackfoot, Idaho, was built in 1916. It was listed on the National Register of Historic Places in 1979.

It is a one-story red brick building, the former home and printing office of the Idaho Republican newspaper. It is 35 by 50 feet (11 m × 15 m) in plan. It is built upon a foundation and basement of steel-reinforced concrete. It was designed by architects Cannon & Fetzer in the late 19th and 20th century and Mission/Spanish Revival style. It was built by the local contractor Dahle & Eccles.

The building has also been known as the American Land Title Company.
