= Hawaiian Missionaries (stamps) =

First postage stamps of the Kingdom of Hawaii

Hawaiian "Missionaries"
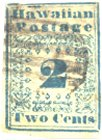
- Country of production: Kingdom of Hawaii
- Location of production: The Polynesian; Honolulu
- Date of production: 1851
- Nature of rarity: Few exist
- No. in existence: 15
- Face value: Two cents
- Estimated value: ~£450,000.00 unused; ~£225,000.00 used

The Hawaiian Missionaries are the first postage stamps of the Kingdom of Hawaii, issued in 1851. They came to be known as the "Missionaries" because they were primarily found on the correspondence of missionaries working in the Hawaiian Islands. Only a handful of these stamps have survived to the present day, and so they are amongst the great rarities of philately.

== Background ==
In the early 19th century, mail to and from Hawaii was carried by ship captains on an ad hoc basis. By 1849, partly as a side effect of the California Gold Rush and the settlement of California, mail to and from San Francisco had increased greatly. In response, the Hawaiian government established a post office and set postal rates. Henry Martyn Whitney, the first postmaster, was authorized to print stamps for those rates in June 1851, which he did using the printing press of The Polynesian, a weekly government newspaper.

== Issuance ==
The stamps went on sale October 1, 1851, in three denominations covering three rates: the 2-cent stamp was for newspapers going to the US, the 5-cent value was for regular mail to the US, and the 13-cent value was for mail to the US East Coast, combining the 5 cents of Hawaiian postage, a 2-cent ship fee, and 6 cents to cover the transcontinental US rate.

The design was very simple, consisting only of a central numeral of the denomination framed by a standard printer's ornament, with the denomination repeated in words at the bottom. The top line read "Hawaiian / Postage" for the 2- and 5-cent values, but "H.I. & U.S. / Postage" for the 13-cent value, reflecting its unusual role of paying two different countries' postage. A thin line surrounded by a thicker line framed the stamp as a whole. All stamps were printed in the same shade of blue on pelure paper, an extremely thin tissue-like paper prone to tearing; 90% of known Missionaries are damaged in some way.

Although the stamps were in regular use until as late as 1856, of the four values issued only about 200 have survived (Scott Trepel's census in the Siegel catalog lists 197, but see below), of which 28 are unused, and 32 are on cover.

The 2-cent is the rarest of the Hawaiian Missionaries, with 15 copies recorded, only one of which is unused. When Maurice Burrus sold this unique unused example in 1921 the price was US$15,000; when Alfred H. Caspary sold the same stamp in 1963 the price was $41,000, the highest value ever paid for any stamp at that time (even more than the British Guiana 1c magenta and "Post Office" Mauritius blue two pence and red one penny rarities). An astonishing lore surrounds this stamp: in 1892, one of its earlier owners, Gaston Leroux, was murdered for it by an envious fellow philatelist, Hector Giroux.

In the 1963 movie Charade, Charles Lampert placed three valuable stamps on an envelope to hide $250,000 he had stolen, with accomplices, during WWII but kept for himself. One of these stamps is a 3 cent Hawaiian Missionary intended to represent the rarer 2 cent value.

=== Gallery ===
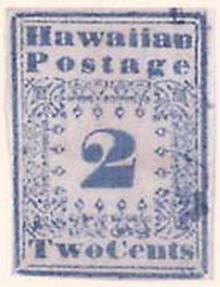
2-cent stamp

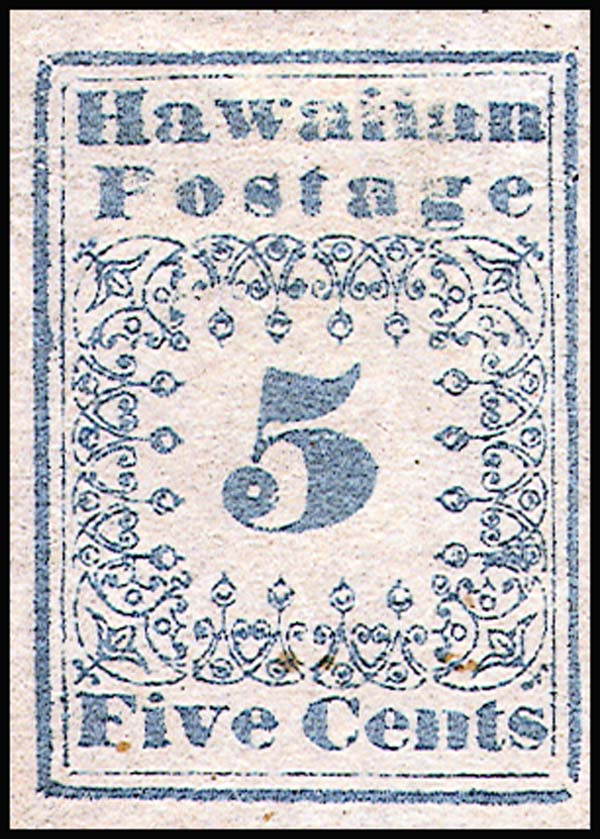
5-cent stamp

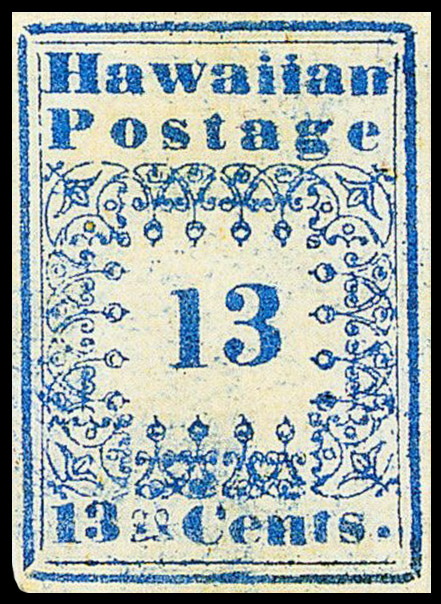
13-cent stamp

== The Dawson cover ==
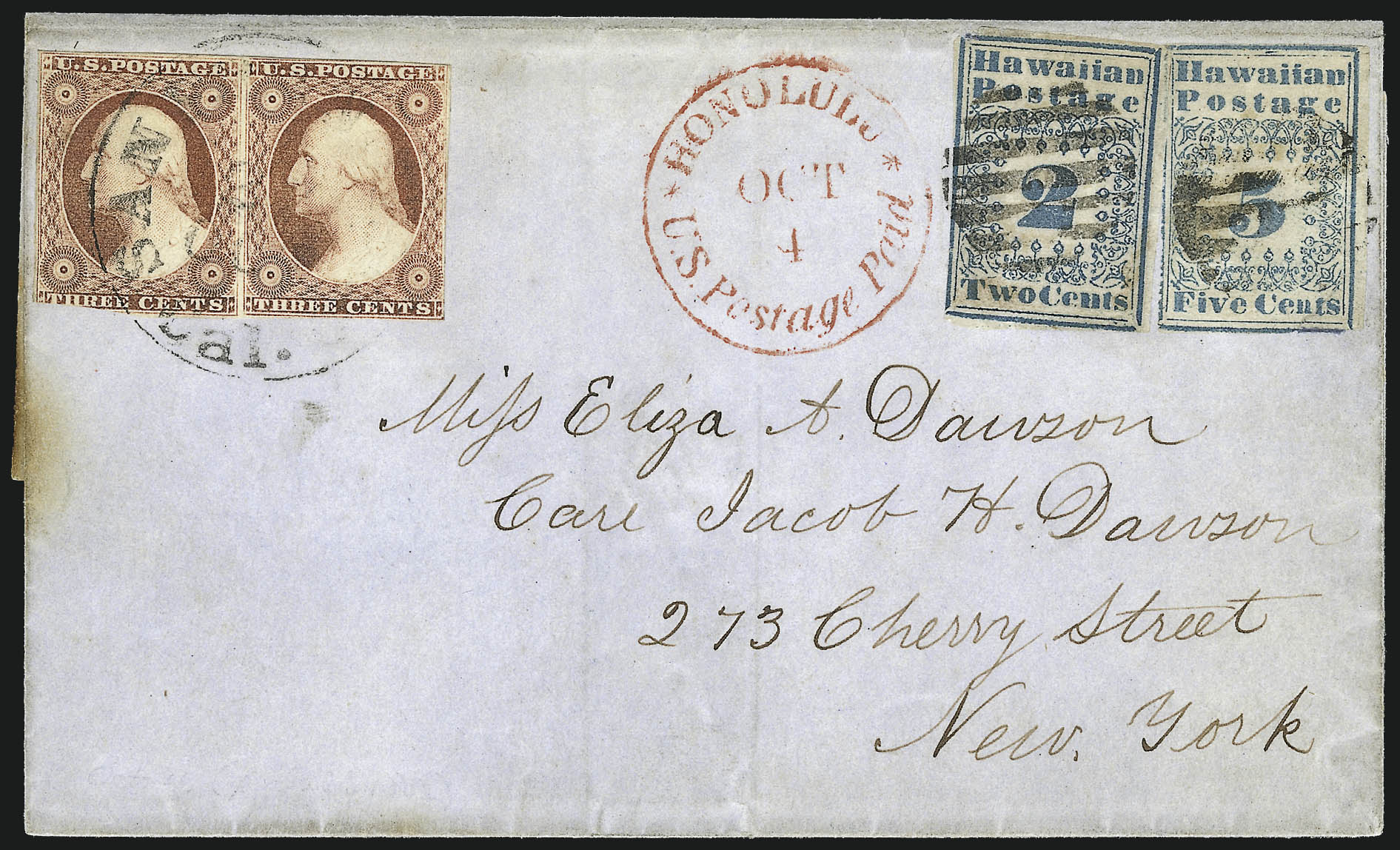
The Dawson cover

The most valuable of all Missionary items is a cover sent to New York City bearing the only known use of the 2-cent value on cover, as well as a 5-cent value and two 3-cent US stamps. This is known as the Dawson Cover. It was in a bundle of correspondence shoved into a factory furnace around 1870, but packed so tightly that the fire went out (though one side of the cover bears a scorch mark). The factory was abandoned; 35 years later, a workman cleaning the factory for reuse discovered the stuffed furnace, and knew enough about stamps to save the unusual covers. This cover was acquired by George H. Worthington in 1905, then bought by Alfred H. Caspary in December 1917 for $6,100. It has changed hands several more times: the Weill brothers bought it for $25,000 in 1957 for Benjamin Dwight Phillips and eleven years later disposed of it from the Phillips collection for $90,000, in the 1995 Siegel auction it realized a price of US$2.09 million ($1.9 million plus 10% buyer's premium), and in 2013 it sold for $2.24 million to an American collector making it one of the highest-priced of all philatelic items.

The Dawson cover, shown on the 2002 Souvenir Sheet (Scott 3694) may be evidence of the validity of the 1850 Treaty of Friendship, Commerce, and Navigation between the United States and Hawaii as a sovereign nation. Under Article XV,

So soon as Steam or other mail packets under the flag of either of the contracting parties, shall have commenced running between their respective ports of entry, the contracting parties agree to receive at the post offices of those ports all mailable matter, and to forward it as directed, the destination being to [some] regular post office of either country, charging thereupon the regular postal rate as established by law in the territories of either party receiving said mailable matter, in addition to the original postage of the office whence the mail [was] sent.

On September 9, 1850, Hawaii's Minister of Foreign Affairs, Robert Crichton Wyllie, asked San Francisco's postmaster J. B. Moore to implement the treaty's mail exchange provision quickly, to support Hawaii's sovereignty against any potential French ambitions in the Hawaiian Islands. Moore agreed by early December, and the Honolulu Post Office opened on December 21, 1850.

== The Grinnell Missionaries ==
In 1920, 43 additional Missionaries appeared on the philatelic market. They came from a Charles Shattuck, whose mother had apparently corresponded with her childhood friend Ursula Newell Emerson, matriarch of a missionary family in Hawaii, were acquired by George H. Grinnell and then sold to dealer John Klemann for $65,000. But in 1922, the stamps' authenticity became the subject of a court case, and they were adjudged forgeries.

They have been studied on a number of occasions since then, but opinion remains divided. In 1922, experts testified that the Grinnells had been produced by photogravure and not by handset moveable type, but in the 1980s Keith Cordrey contended that they were probably typeset, and the Royal Philatelic Society London agreed. Further analysis showed that the ink and paper were consistent with 1850s types. Even so, the Royal Philatelic Society declared the stamps to be counterfeit. A book detailing their findings was published in 2006 titled The Investigation of the Grinnell Hawaiian Missionaries by the Expert Committee of the Royal Philatelic Society London by Patrick Pearson.

In May 2006, Mystic Stamp Company announced that they had acquired 36 of the Grinnells from the descendants of George Grinnell, and were selling the group "as is" for US$1.5 million.

Many of the surviving Missionaries are repaired, and David Beech has commented that they probably would not have survived had they not been.

== See also ==
- Hawaiian Philatelic Society
- List of notable postage stamps
- Postage stamps and postal history of Hawaii

== References and sources ==
Sources

- Donna O'Keefe, Linn's Philatelic Gems 1 (Amos Press, 1989)
- Siegel auction catalog for the Honolulu Advertiser collection, November 1995
- Henry A. Meyer. Hawaii, its stamp and postal history. New York: Philatelic Foundation, 1948
