= Cannon & Fetzer =

American architectural firm

Cannon & Fetzer was an American architectural firm that operated between 1909 and 1937 in Salt Lake City, Utah. Lewis T. Cannon and John Fetzer were the principal architects. A number of its works are listed on the U.S. National Register of Historic Places. For a brief time between 1910 and 1915, the firm was named Cannon, Fetzer & Hansen after partnering with Ramm Hansen. Many of their works survive and are listed on the U.S. National Register of Historic Places.

== Images of architectural works ==
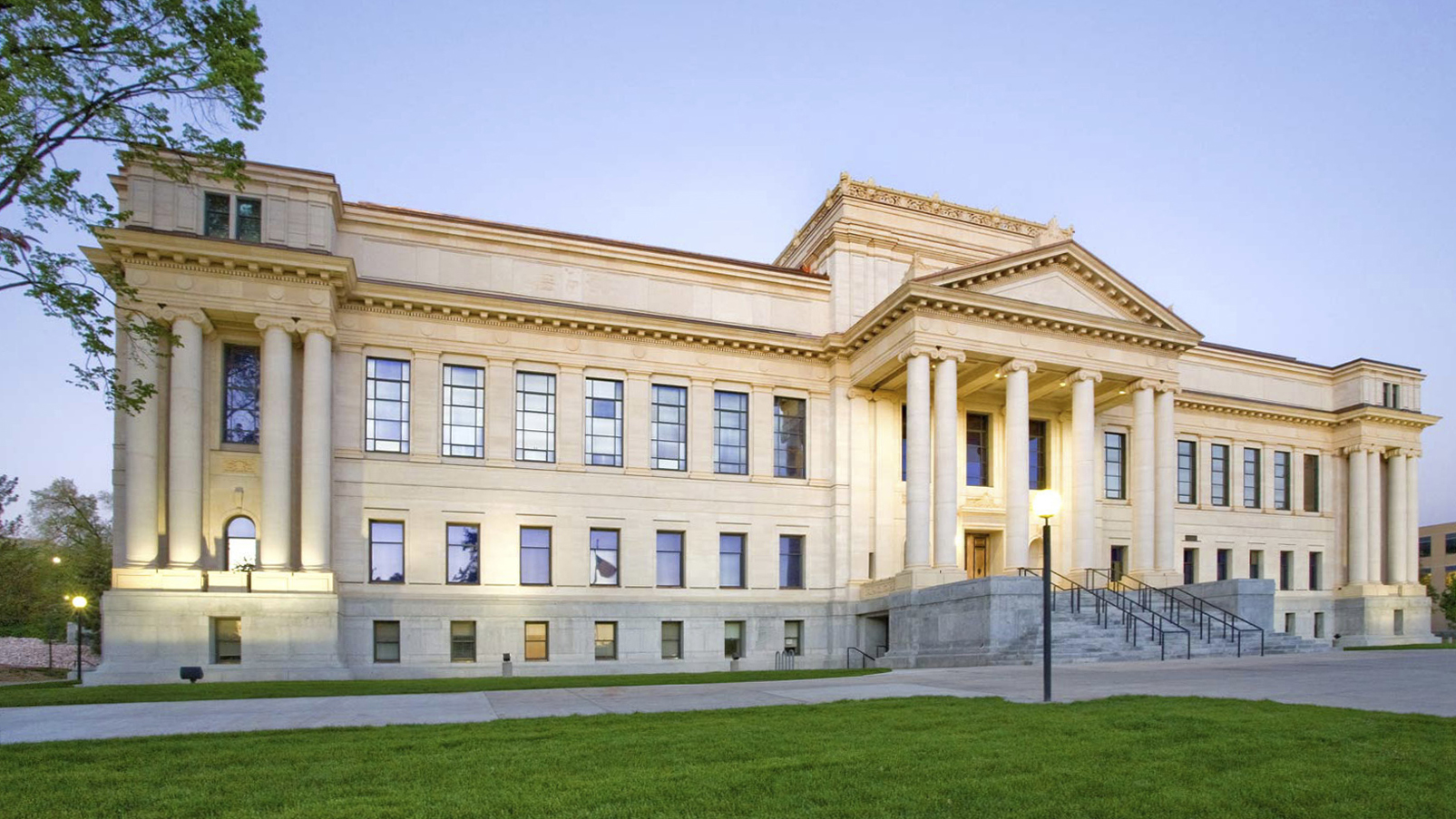
The Park Building at University of Utah

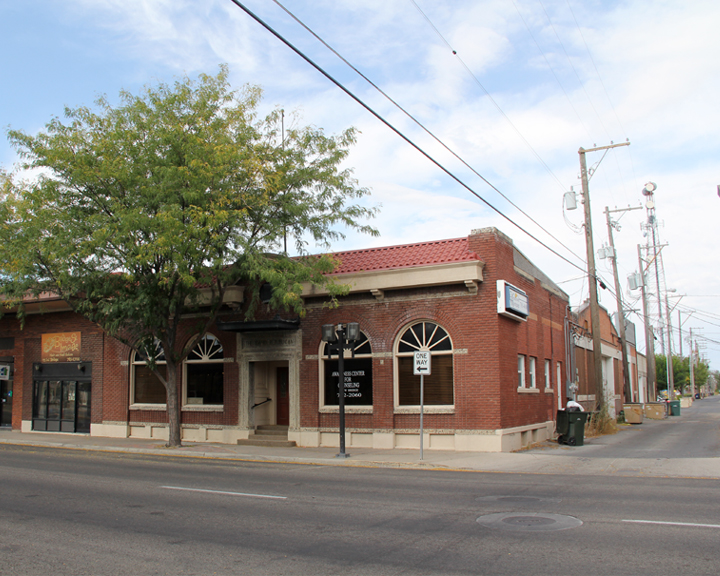
Idaho Republican Building

== Other works include (with attribution) ==
- Fifth Ward Meetinghouse (built 1910), 740 S. 300 West Salt Lake City, Utah (Cannon & Fetzer), NRHP-listed
- Idaho Republican Building (build 1916), 167 W. Bridge St., Blackfoot, Idaho (Cannon & Fetzer), NRHP-listed
- Technical High School, 241 N. 300 West Salt Lake City, Utah (Cannon & Fetzer, et al.), formerly NRHP-listed
- US Post Office-Cedar City Main, 10 N. Main Cedar City, Utah (Cannon & Fetzer), NRHP-listed
- Wasatch Springs Plunge, 840 N. 300 West Salt Lake City, Utah (Cannon & Fetzer), NRHP-listed
