= Henry Martyn Whitney =

Early journalist in the Kingdom of Hawaii

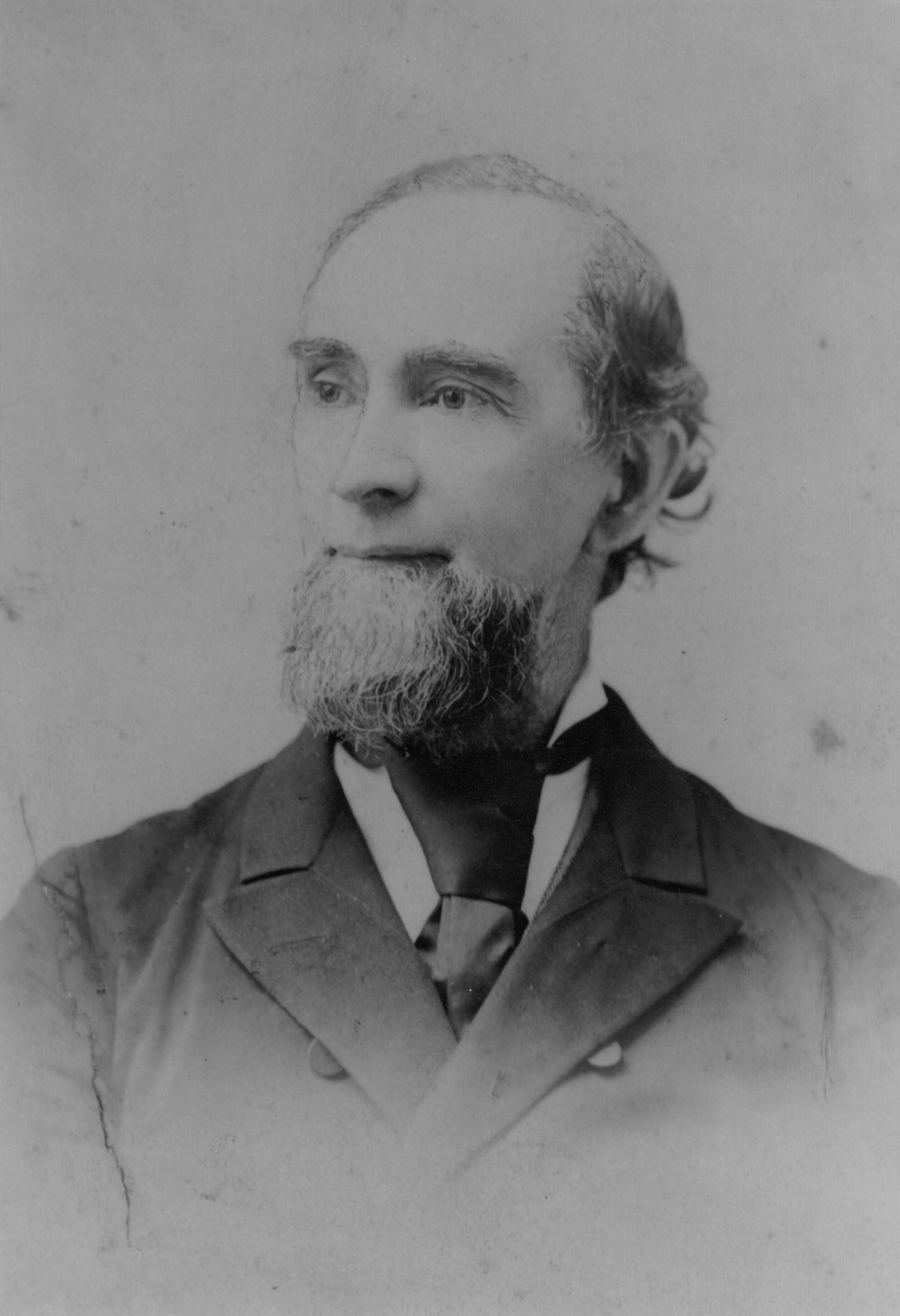
- Born: June 5, 1824; Waimea, Kauaʻi; Kingdom of Hawaii
- Died: August 17, 1904 (aged 80); Honolulu, Hawaii
- Known for: Hawaiian Missionaries stamps Newspaper publisher

Henry Martyn Whitney (June 5, 1824 – August 17, 1904) was an early journalist in the Kingdom of Hawaii. Born of early missionaries, he became the first postmaster and founded several long-lasting newspapers.

== Early life ==
Henry Martyn Whitney was born June 5, 1824, in Waimea on the island of Kauaʻi. His father was missionary Samuel Whitney (1793–1845) and he was the namesake of English missionary Henry Martyn. His mother was Mercy Partidge (1795–1872), granddaughter of Adonijah Bidwell. His sister Maria Kapule Whitney (1820–1900) married missionary John L. Pogue (1814–1877). His father was originally a lay teacher, but was ordained in the field on November 30, 1825. The family moved to Lahaina on Maui in 1827, and then back to Waimea in 1829.

Whitney was sent to Rochester, New York, for school in 1831, and graduated from the Rochester Collegiate Institute in 1841. He planned to enter college, but a hearing loss convinced him to work in journalism. He worked for Harper & Brothers in New York City where he learned the printing trade and became a foreman in two years. He also worked in the American Bible Society printing office. He might have had a piece printed in the New York Tribune of Horace Greeley. His relatives and other missionary friends, such as Gerrit P. Judd who was now in the government, tried to persuade him to return to Hawaii, since few journalists had left to join the California Gold Rush. Whitney married Catherine Olivia March (1821–1896) in June 1849, and travelled via Panama to San Francisco. He happened to meet Judd there with two young Hawaiian princes. By November Whitney arrived back in Hawaii; his new wife arrived in January 1850.

== Pioneer publisher ==
=== Postmaster ===
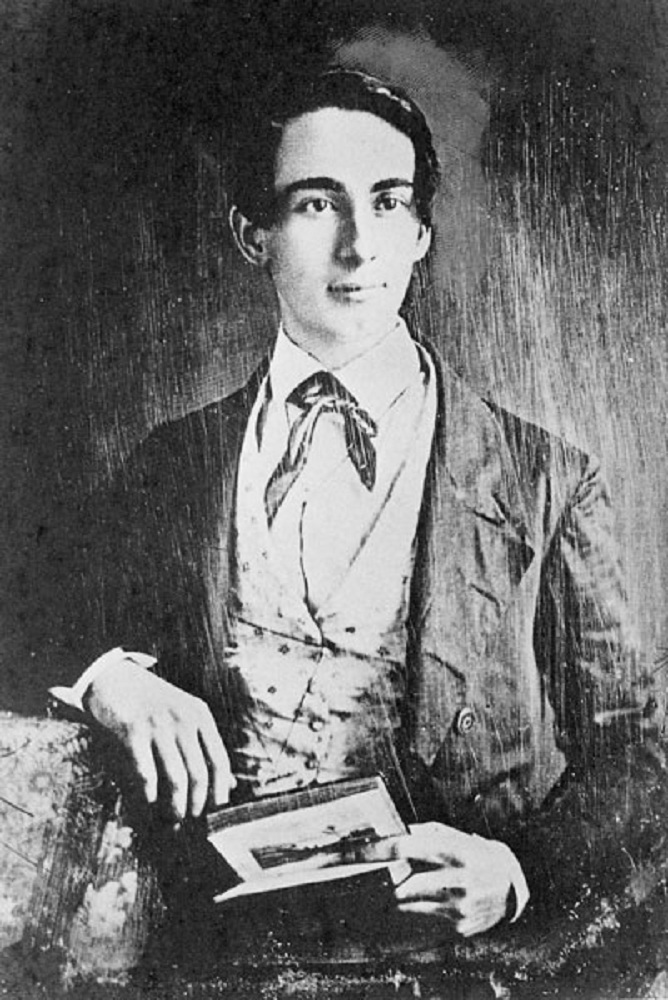
Henry Martyn Whitney

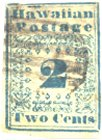
A rare Hawaiian Missionaries stamp from 1851

Whitney worked for the Kingdom of Hawaii government printing office, which published a newspaper called The Polynesian (but he did not have editorial control). Whitney became the first postmaster general in Hawaii on December 22, 1850. Before that time, the Polynesian office had just used an informal mail bag that customers could use to gather letters to be taken by the next ship. The first stamps issued by the kingdom in 1851 are now called Hawaiian Missionaries. In 1855 he was elected to one term in the house of representatives of the legislature of the Hawaiian Kingdom. He grew disenchanted with government service and wanted to go into business for himself. He offered to buy the printing office, but the government was not interested. He also invested in a wheat flour mill briefly but sold that business in 1856. On July 1, 1856, he resigned as postmaster and was replaced by Joseph Jackson.

=== Independent newspaper ===
On July 2, 1856, Whitney produced the first issue of his own newspaper: a four-sheet weekly called the Pacific Commercial Advertiser. It was the first successful publication in Hawaii sponsored by advertisements. Other attempts at independent newspapers had quickly gone out of business or become supported by government or missionary funding. Its name is based on the New York Commercial Advertiser which Whitney had known while living on the mainland, at least being acquainted with its editor William L. Stone. The first issue contained the news of Kamehameha IV's royal wedding to Emma Rooke besides the titular advertisements. A sketch Whitney made of Honolulu Harbor after climbing the mast of a ship became the paper's symbol even after the masthead was redesigned.

In his words of the first editorial:

Thank heaven the day at length has dawned when the Hawaiian Nation can boast a free press, untrammelled by government patronage or party pledges, unbiased by ministerial frowns or favors — a press whose aim shall be the advancement of the nation in its commercial, political and social condition.

Although born in the Kingdom of Hawaii (and thus a citizen of that country), he openly called for closer ties with the United States. The second Advertiser issue included coverage of the US Independence Day celebrations. The first issues were printed on a hand press that produced 600 papers an hour, but by March 1857 he could expand circulation with a new power press invented by Isaac Adams. In 1859 Whitney acquired the assets of the Sandwich Islands Mission Press, paid for with printing services. The mission press had been established in 1822 as the first printing operation of any kind in Hawaii.

=== Hawaiian language contributions ===
Whitney established a Hawaiian language newspaper Ka Nupepa Kūʻokoʻa ("the independent newspaper") in 1861, in response to the publication of the native Hawaiian newspaper Ka Hoku o ka Pakipika that commenced only one month previous. Whitney sought to control the Hawaiian language press at this time, and allowed extensive space in his paper to be utilized for the criticism of native traditions and beliefs, despite the fact that he employed many natives. Based on a one-page section his Advertiser in Hawaiian called Ka Hoku Loa ("the morning star"), it was first edited William P. Ragsdale, a half-Hawaiian and famous legislative interpreter. After Ragsdale contracted leprosy Whitney replaced him with fellow missionary son Luther Halsey Gulick. Whitney would serve as editor at various times. He hired native Hawaiians including Joseph Kawainui, and fellow Americans John Mott-Smith, Samuel Gardner Wilder, and Thomas George Thrum. Historian Samuel Kamakau wrote a series on Hawaiian history that has been translated and published in English. In 1862 Ka Nupepa Kūʻokoʻa published a two-color engraving of the Hawaiian flag, a level of professionalism not matched the other smaller Hawaiian language publications. In 1865 the bilingual Whitney published one of the first Hawaiian language dictionaries compiled by Lorrin Andrews.

=== Politics ===
Over time Whitney became more outspoken in opposition to the monarchy, especially King Kamehameha V whom Whitney claimed was shifting the kingdom away from American Puritan influence to Europeans, such as allowing the St. Andrew's Cathedral to be built for Anglican Bishop Thomas Nettleship Staley. Kamehameha IV and Kamehameha V were the two princes Whitney met in 1849.

Scottish-born cabinet minister Robert Crichton Wyllie threatened Whitney with a libel suit, but eventually backed down.

In 1866 the young reporter Samuel Clemens asked for a job, but there were no openings since Whitney already had the small staff he needed. Clemens, later better known as Mark Twain, often dropped by the office since Whitney enjoyed his humor and would borrow Whitney's cigars.

Originally Whitney's newspapers were focused on an objective professional philosophy to "get the story first". However, as Twain became more popular, Whitney adopted the satiric humorist's style. They exchanged letters and Twain mocked Staley and the Hawaiian royalty as he toured the US and wrote his book Roughing It with a chapter on Hawaii.

The two kept up an exchange of hyperbolic threats over a book that Whitney claimed Twain had borrowed, while Twain claimed the book belonged to Samuel Chenery Damon:

I am going chiefly, however, to eat the editor of the Commercial Advertiser for saying I do not write the truth about the Hawaiian Islands, and for exposing my highway robbery in carrying off Father Damen's book - History of the Islands. I shall go there might hungry. Mr. Whitney is jealous of me because I speak the truth so naturally, and he can't do it without taking the lock-jaw. But he ought not to be jealous; he ought not to try to ruin me because I am more virtuous than his is; I cannot help it - it is my nature to be reliable, just as it is his to be shaky on matters of fact - we cannot alter these natures - us leopards cannot change our spots. Therefore, why growl? - why go and try to make trouble? If he cannot tell when I am writing seriously and when I am burlesquing - if he sits down solemnly and take one of my palpable burlesques and reads it with a funereal aspect, and swallows it as petrified truth, - how am I going to help it? I cannot give him the keen perception that nature denied him - now can I? Whitney knows that. Whitney knows he has done me many a kindness, and that I do not forget it, and am still grateful - and he knows that if I could scour him up so that he could tell a broad burlesque from a plain statement of fact, I would get up in the night and walk any distance to do it. You know that, Whitney. But I am coming down there might hungry - most uncommonly hungry, Whitney.

Whitney strongly supported the Union in the American Civil War, although the kingdom was officially neutral.

He printed letters from Charles Guillou critical of James W. Borden, the US Commissioner, who was from the South and had relatives in the Confederacy. Borden threatened Whitney with a knife, but had diplomatic immunity.

After the war, he opposed the importing of contract labor from Asia, comparing it to slavery. This put him at odds with the growing influence of wealthy Hawaiian sugar planters.

In 1870, after a threat of advertising boycotts by the planters, he sold the Advertiser to investors James H. Black and William Auld, but remained associated as editor. Whitney claimed he did not cave into planters' demands, but sold to finance a vacation with his family back to the United States, which he took in May 1871. On hearing the news Mark Twain continued the joke about cannibalism: "Mr. Whitney is one of the fairest-minded and best-hearted cannibals I ever knew" and "we used to eat a great many people in those halcyon days."

In 1872 he published a book on Hawaiian history with former Polynesian publisher James Jackson Jarves. The book was an expanded update of the 1840s Jarves book borrowed by Mark Twain on his 1866 trip with appendix by Whitney.

On January 22, 1873, Whitney was appointed to the privy council of King Lunalilo, but Lunalilo died just a year later.

In 1873 Whitney bought the Hawaiian Gazette company which published a weekly.

The Gazette had been founded in 1865 as a government publication by James Black after the Polynesian had failed in 1864.

In 1875, Whitney published the first tourist guidebook to Hawaii.

Whitney renewed his battles with the administration of the new King Kalākaua. By January 1878 Thomas Crawford MacDowell took over editing the Gazette, but Whitney kept a stake in the printing company.

In 1880, Claus Spreckels financed the purchase of the Advertiser by Walter Murray Gibson. Whitney cut any ties with the Advertiser and wrote editorials attacking Gibson (who was appointed to several prominent positions in the cabinet) and Kalākaua in the Gazette.

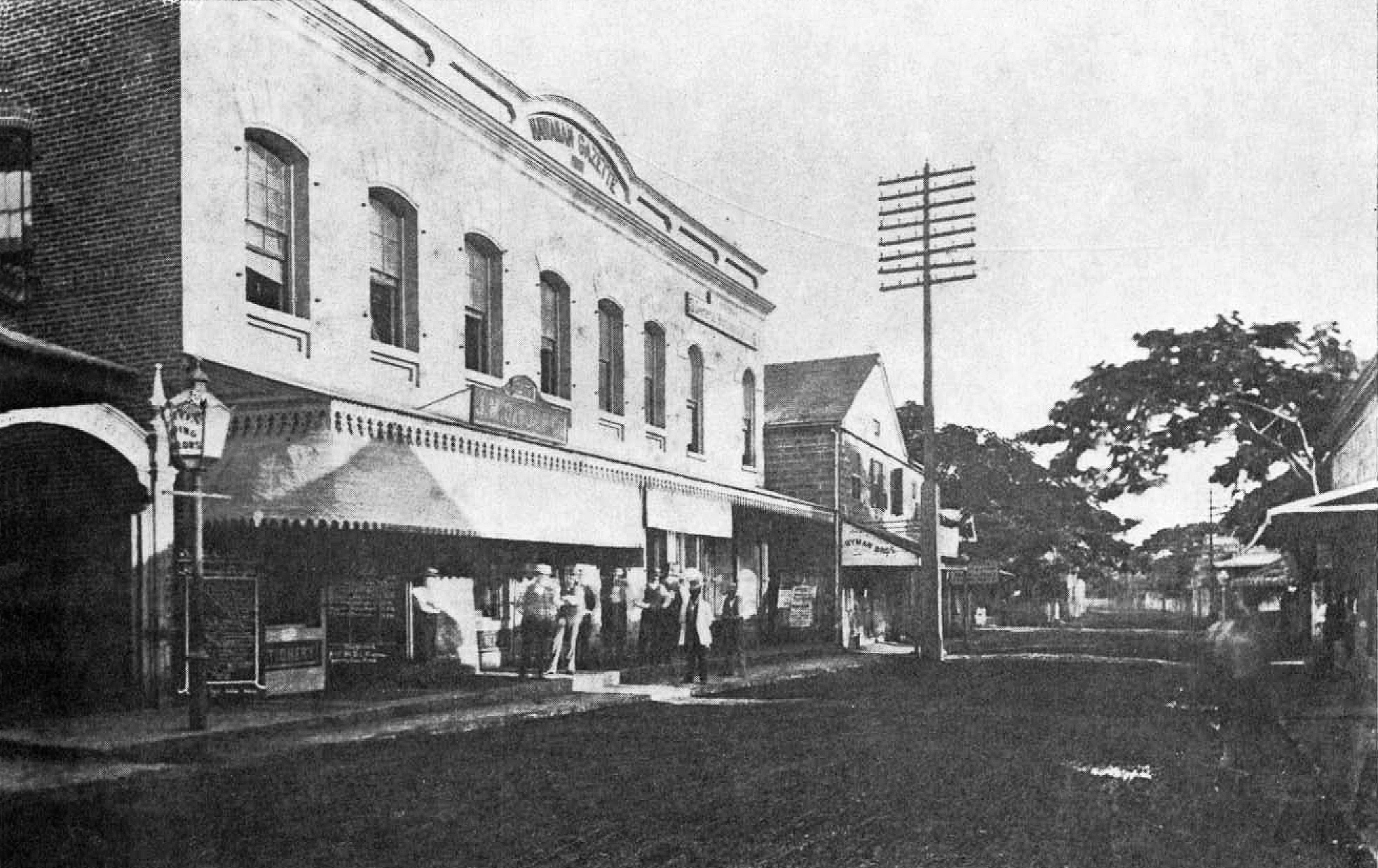
The Hawaiian Gazette building in 1880s

Meanwhile, the Gazette business had grown to the point where a new building was built in 1881, and offices moved there in 1882, next door to the original Advertiser building, which was in turn next to the original post office.

This block of the street was sometimes called "printers row". While working in the stationery store on the ground floor, Whitney could not resist the urge to publish. He posted a one-page Marine Bulletin on the store window with news that quickly became popular.

After John Kapena resigned to become minister of foreign affairs, Whitney was again appointed postmaster general on February 16, 1883 (although by this time there was more than one post office). He served until April 15, 1886. He resigned after a financial scandal and robbery, replaced by John Lot Kaulukou.

Whitney made his peace with the plantation owners and was editor of the Planter's Monthly from 1886.

He was "one of the important promoters of the Hawaiian tourist industry" as he brought out new editions of his guide book in 1890 and 1895.

James W. Robinson bought the rights to the Bulletin and developed it into the newspaper known as the Honolulu Star-Bulletin.

In 1888 the Hawaiian Gazette Company bought the Pacific Commercial Advertiser, which Whitney managed until 1894. Just a year later, the Advertiser got its first linotype machine. Lorrin A. Thurston bought the Advertiser in 1895, whose family would own it until 1992.

Active until the end, Whitney edited Planter's Monthly until April 1903.

He died suddenly at his home on August 17, 1904. He was buried in the Oahu Cemetery in Honolulu.

== Family and legacy ==
His children were:

1. Henry Ely Whitney was born March 20, 1850, and died July 17, 1883.
2. Helen Brown Whitney was born May 1, 1852, married Luke Chase Kelley and died April 7, 1896.
3. Henry Martyn Whitney Jr. was born March 26, 1856, and died February 7, 1936.
4. James Nowell Whitney was born October 22, 1858, and died in Cambridgeport, Massachusetts.
5. Emma March Whitney was born January 6, 1863, married William Whitmore Goodale (1857–1929) in 1884, and died June 9, 1943. Their son Holbrook March Goodale (1889–1927) married Juliet Atwood Rice (1901–1987) (granddaughter of William Hyde Rice) in 1922. After Goodale's death she remarried, and later co-founded the Kauaʻi Museum.
6. Albert James Whitney was born November 7, 1865, but died in 1869.
7. Frederich Damon Whitney was born November 7, 1867, and died December 25, 1897.

The Gazette survived until 1918. Ka Nupepa Kūʻokoʻa became the most circulated and longest lasting Hawaiian language newspaper, publishing until 1927. The Advertiser later became known as the Honolulu Advertiser, which published daily until it was merged in June 2010 with the other major newspaper to become the Honolulu Star-Advertiser. Whitney's first editorial was reprinted in the last issue.

== Other works ==
- H. M. Whitney, ed. (1894). The Hawaiian coffee planters' manual. With notes of the methods of coffee culture practised in Guatemala, Brazil, Liberia and Ceylon. Honolulu: Hawaiian Gazette Company Press.
- Henry Martyn Whitney (1895). A brief sketch of the early history and growth of the sugar industry in Hawaii, and its pre-eminent advantages as a field for investment of capital. Honolulu: Hawaiian Gazette Company Press.
