= Utah's congressional delegations =

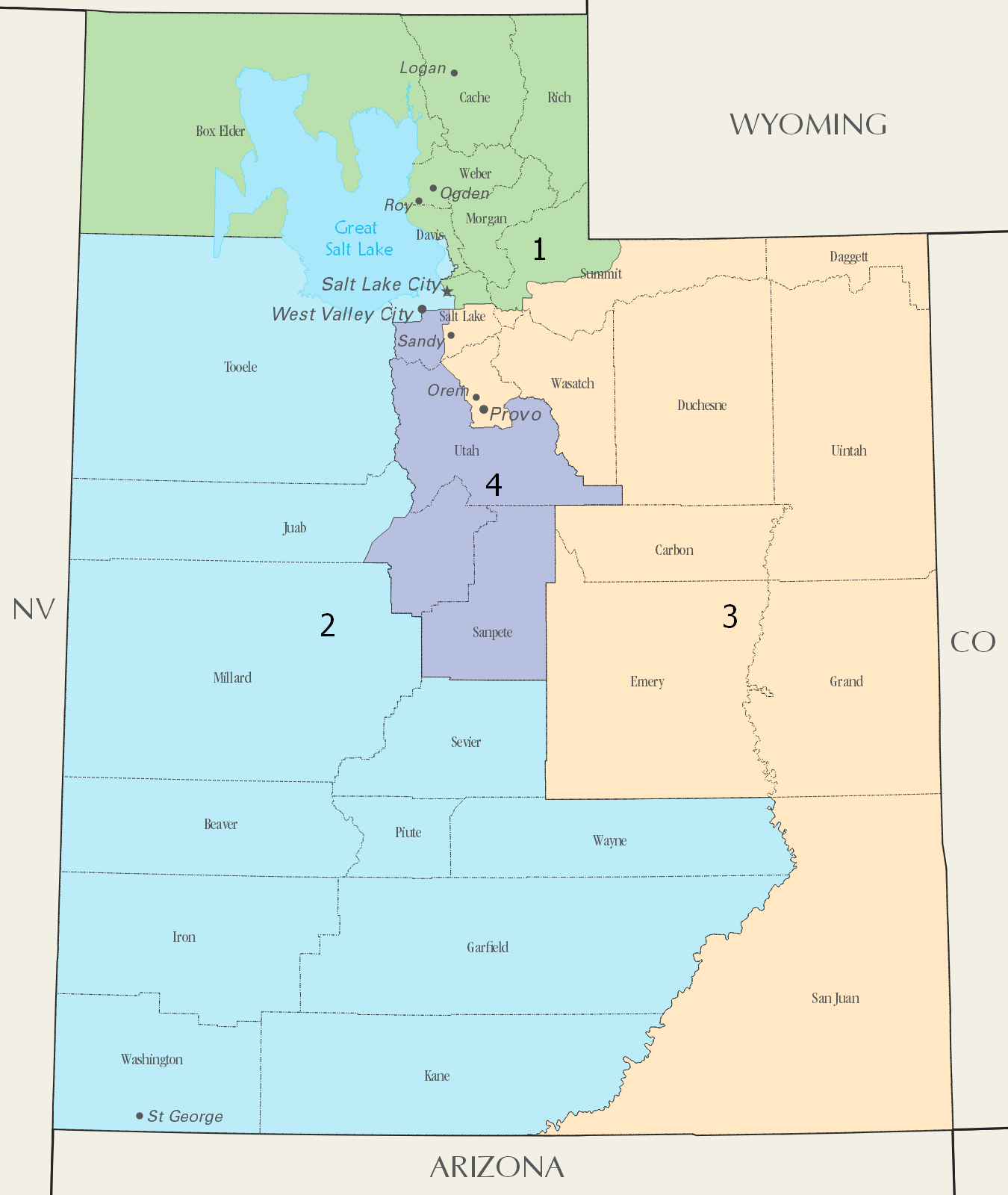
Geographical location of Utah's four congressional districts to the United States House of Representatives since 2023.

Since Utah became a U.S. state in 1896, it has sent congressional delegations to the United States Senate and United States House of Representatives. Each state elects two senators to serve for six years. Before the Seventeenth Amendment in 1913, senators were elected by the Utah State Legislature. Members of the House of Representatives are elected to two-year terms, one from each of Utah's four congressional districts. Before becoming a state, the Territory of Utah elected a non-voting delegate at-large to Congress from 1850 to 1896.

58 people have served either the Territory or State of Utah: 14 in the Senate, 42 in the House, and 2 in both houses. The average term for senators has been 15.3 years and the average term for representatives has been 6.7 years. The longest-serving senator was Orrin Hatch, from 1977 to 2019. The longest-serving representative is James V. Hansen, in office for 22 years from 1981 to 2003. No Utah women have served in the Senate, but five women - Reva Beck Bosone, Karen Shepherd, Enid Greene, Mia Love, and Celeste Maloy - have been representatives.

The current dean of the Utah delegation is Senator Mike Lee, having served in Congress since 2011.

== U.S. Senate ==
Current U.S. senators from Utah
Utah CPVI (2025): R+11	Class I senator	Class III senator
Utah CPVI (2025): R+11	John Curtis (Junior senator) (Provo)	Mike Lee (Senior senator) (Provo)
Party	Republican	Republican
Incumbent since	January 3, 2025	January 3, 2011

Each state elects two senators by statewide popular vote every six years. The terms of the two senators are staggered so that they are not elected in the same year. Utah's senators are elected in the years from classes 1 and 3. Senators were originally chosen by the Utah House of Representatives until the Seventeenth Amendment came into force in 1913.

There have been eighteen senators elected from Utah, of whom five have been Democrats and thirteen have been Republicans. Utah's current senators are Republicans Mike Lee, in office since 2011, and John Curtis, in office since 2025.

Democratic (D) Republican (R) Silver Republican (SvR)

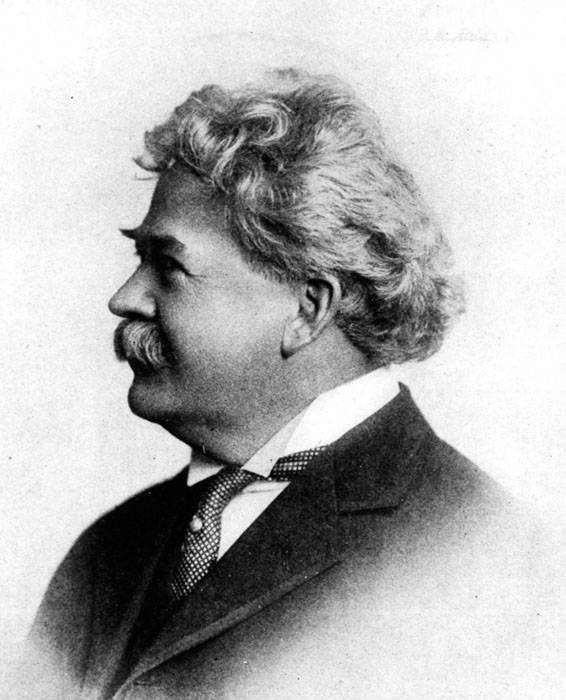
Frank J. Cannon, Utah's last territorial delegate and first senator

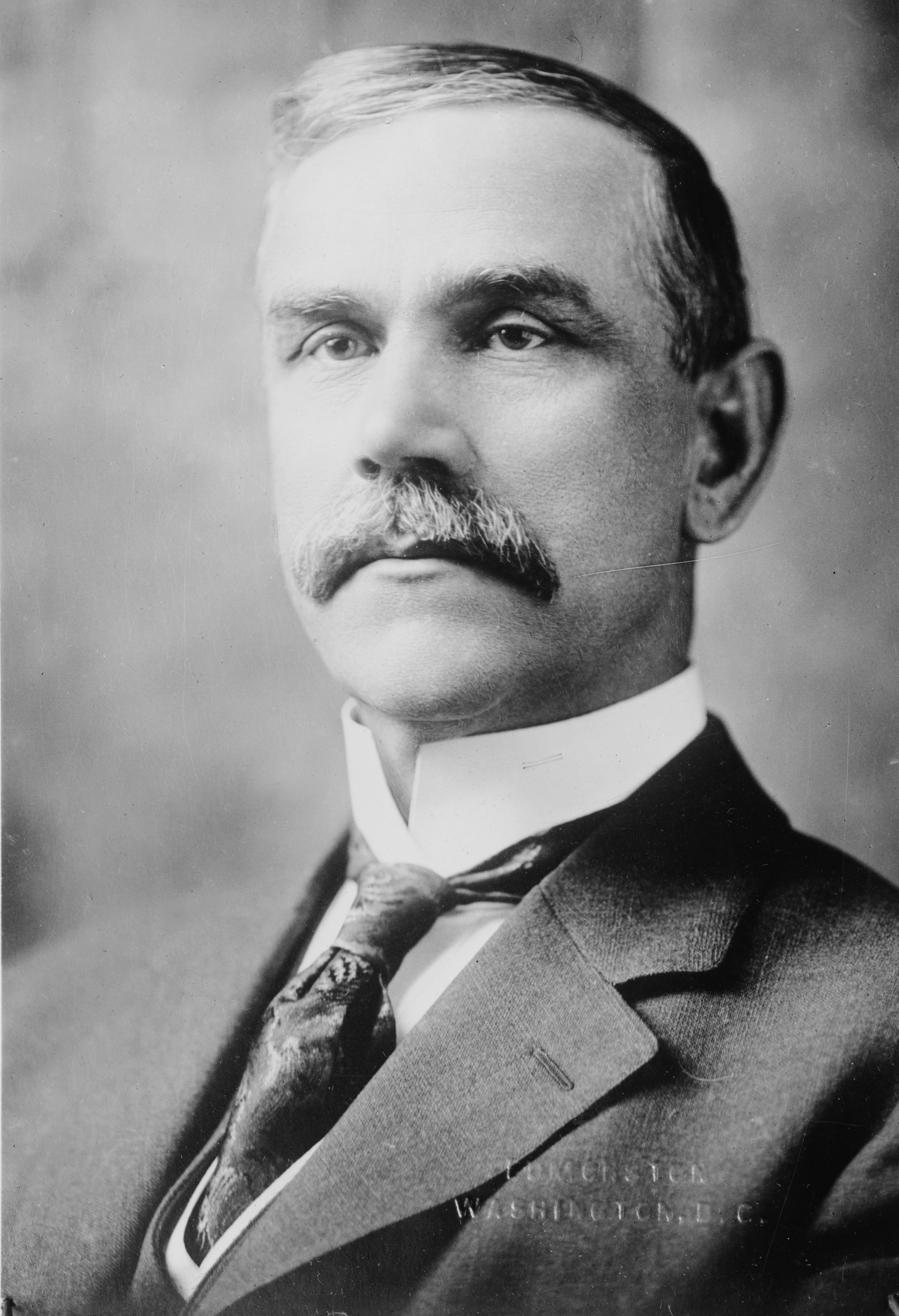
Reed Smoot, senator from Utah for 30 years

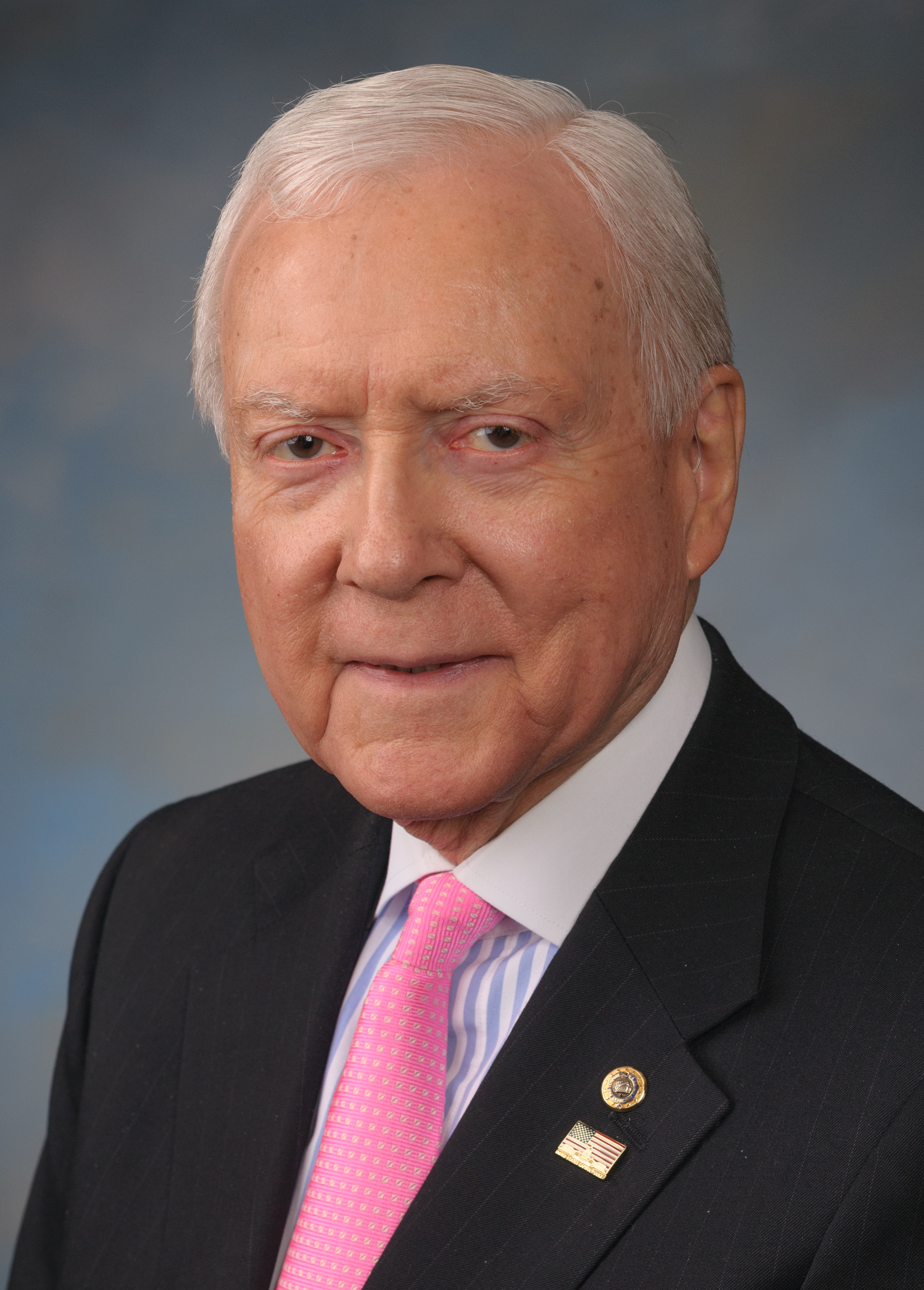
Orrin Hatch, Utah's longest-serving senator.

Class I senator	Congress	Class III senator
Frank J. Cannon (R)	54th (1895–1897)	Arthur Brown (R)
Frank J. Cannon (SvR)	55th (1897–1899)	Joseph L. Rawlins (D)
vacant (Note: Seat was vacant due to Utah Legislature's failure to elect a senator.)	56th (1899–1901)	Joseph L. Rawlins (D)
Thomas Kearns (R) (Note: Kearns served the four years remaining in the term beginning in 1899.)	56th (1899–1901)	Joseph L. Rawlins (D)
Thomas Kearns (R)	57th (1901–1903)	Joseph L. Rawlins (D)
Thomas Kearns (R)	58th (1903–1905)	Reed Smoot (R) (Note: Smoot, a monogamist, was seated in 1904, but was on trial in the Senate until 1907 to see if any Mormon could hold political office.)
George Sutherland (R)	59th (1905–1907)	Reed Smoot (R)
George Sutherland (R)	60th (1907–1909)	Reed Smoot (R)
George Sutherland (R)	61st (1909–1911)	Reed Smoot (R)
George Sutherland (R)	62nd (1911–1913)	Reed Smoot (R)
George Sutherland (R)	63rd (1913–1915)	Reed Smoot (R)
George Sutherland (R)	64th (1915–1917)	Reed Smoot (R)
William H. King (D)	65th (1917–1919)	Reed Smoot (R)
William H. King (D)	66th (1919–1921)	Reed Smoot (R)
William H. King (D)	67th (1921–1923)	Reed Smoot (R)
William H. King (D)	68th (1923–1925)	Reed Smoot (R)
William H. King (D)	69th (1925–1927)	Reed Smoot (R)
William H. King (D)	70th (1927–1929)	Reed Smoot (R)
William H. King (D)	71st (1929–1931)	Reed Smoot (R)
William H. King (D)	72nd (1931–1933)	Reed Smoot (R)
William H. King (D)	73rd (1933–1935)	Elbert D. Thomas (D)
William H. King (D)	74th (1935–1937)	Elbert D. Thomas (D)
William H. King (D)	75th (1937–1939)	Elbert D. Thomas (D)
William H. King (D)	76th (1939–1941)	Elbert D. Thomas (D)
Abe Murdock (D)	77th (1941–1943)	Elbert D. Thomas (D)
Abe Murdock (D)	78th (1943–1945)	Elbert D. Thomas (D)
Abe Murdock (D)	79th (1945–1947)	Elbert D. Thomas (D)
Arthur V. Watkins (R)	80th (1947–1949)	Elbert D. Thomas (D)
Arthur V. Watkins (R)	81st (1949–1951)	Elbert D. Thomas (D)
Arthur V. Watkins (R)	82nd (1951–1953)	Wallace F. Bennett (R) (Note: Wallace Bennett was not a candidate for re-election in 1974, and resigned early, presumably to allow his successor to gain seniority over others elected in 1974.)
Arthur V. Watkins (R)	83rd (1953–1955)	Wallace F. Bennett (R)
Arthur V. Watkins (R)	84th (1955–1957)	Wallace F. Bennett (R)
Arthur V. Watkins (R)	85th (1957–1959)	Wallace F. Bennett (R)
Frank Moss (D)	86th (1959–1961)	Wallace F. Bennett (R)
Frank Moss (D)	87th (1961–1963)	Wallace F. Bennett (R)
Frank Moss (D)	88th (1963–1965)	Wallace F. Bennett (R)
Frank Moss (D)	89th (1965–1967)	Wallace F. Bennett (R)
Frank Moss (D)	90th (1967–1969)	Wallace F. Bennett (R)
Frank Moss (D)	91st (1969–1971)	Wallace F. Bennett (R)
Frank Moss (D)	92nd (1971–1973)	Wallace F. Bennett (R)
Frank Moss (D)	93rd (1973–1975)	Wallace F. Bennett (R)
Frank Moss (D)	93rd (1973–1975)	Jake Garn (R)
Frank Moss (D)	94th (1975–1977)	Jake Garn (R)
Orrin Hatch (R)	95th (1977–1979)	Jake Garn (R)
Orrin Hatch (R)	96th (1979–1981)	Jake Garn (R)
Orrin Hatch (R)	97th (1981–1983)	Jake Garn (R)
Orrin Hatch (R)	98th (1983–1985)	Jake Garn (R)
Orrin Hatch (R)	99th (1985–1987)	Jake Garn (R)
Orrin Hatch (R)	100th (1987–1989)	Jake Garn (R)
Orrin Hatch (R)	101st (1989–1991)	Jake Garn (R)
Orrin Hatch (R)	102nd (1991–1993)	Jake Garn (R)
Orrin Hatch (R)	103rd (1993–1995)	Bob Bennett (R)
Orrin Hatch (R)	104th (1995–1997)	Bob Bennett (R)
Orrin Hatch (R)	105th (1997–1999)	Bob Bennett (R)
Orrin Hatch (R)	106th (1999–2001)	Bob Bennett (R)
Orrin Hatch (R)	107th (2001–2003)	Bob Bennett (R)
Orrin Hatch (R)	108th (2003–2005)	Bob Bennett (R)
Orrin Hatch (R)	109th (2005–2007)	Bob Bennett (R)
Orrin Hatch (R)	110th (2007–2009)	Bob Bennett (R)
Orrin Hatch (R)	111th (2009–2011)	Bob Bennett (R)
Orrin Hatch (R)	112th (2011–2013)	Mike Lee (R)
Orrin Hatch (R)	113th (2013–2015)	Mike Lee (R)
Orrin Hatch (R)	114th (2015–2017)	Mike Lee (R)
Orrin Hatch (R)	115th (2017–2019)	Mike Lee (R)
Mitt Romney (R)	116th (2019–2021)	Mike Lee (R)
Mitt Romney (R)	117th (2021–2023)	Mike Lee (R)
Mitt Romney (R)	118th (2023–2025)	Mike Lee (R)
John Curtis (R)	119th (2025–2027)	Mike Lee (R)
John Curtis (R)	120th (2027–2029)	Mike Lee (R)

== U.S. House of Representatives ==
=== Current representatives ===
Current U.S. representatives from Utah
District	Member (Residence)	Party	Incumbent since	CPVI (2025)	District map
1st	Blake Moore (Salt Lake City)	Republican	January 3, 2021	R+10	
2nd	Celeste Maloy (Cedar City)	Republican	November 21, 2023	R+10	
3rd	Mike Kennedy (Alpine)	Republican	January 3, 2025	R+10	
4th	Burgess Owens (Salt Lake City)	Republican	January 3, 2021	R+14	

=== Delegates from Utah Territory ===
The Territory of Utah was an organized incorporated territory of the United States formed on September 9, 1850. The territory initially consisted of present-day Utah, most of Nevada, and portions of Colorado and Wyoming. On February 28, 1861, the creation of Colorado Territory took land from the eastern side of Utah Territory. Nevada Territory was organized from the western section of Utah Territory on March 2, 1861. Also on that date, Nebraska Territory gained area from the northeastern part of Utah Territory. Nevada Territory gained area from Utah Territory on July 14, 1862, and again on May 5, 1866, after becoming a state. Wyoming Territory was created on July 25, 1868, from Nebraska Territory, taking more area from the northeast corner and giving Utah Territory its final borders.

The territorial delegates were elected to two-year terms. Delegates were allowed to serve on committees, debate, and submit legislation, but were not permitted to vote on bills. Delegates only served in the House of Representatives as there was no representation in the Senate until Utah became a state.

Democratic (D) Independent (I) Liberal (L) Populist (Pop) Republican (R)

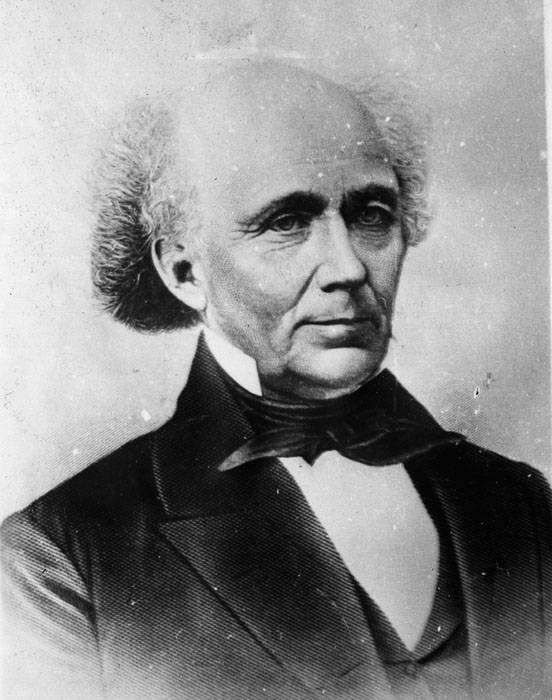
John M. Bernhisel, Utah's first territorial delegate

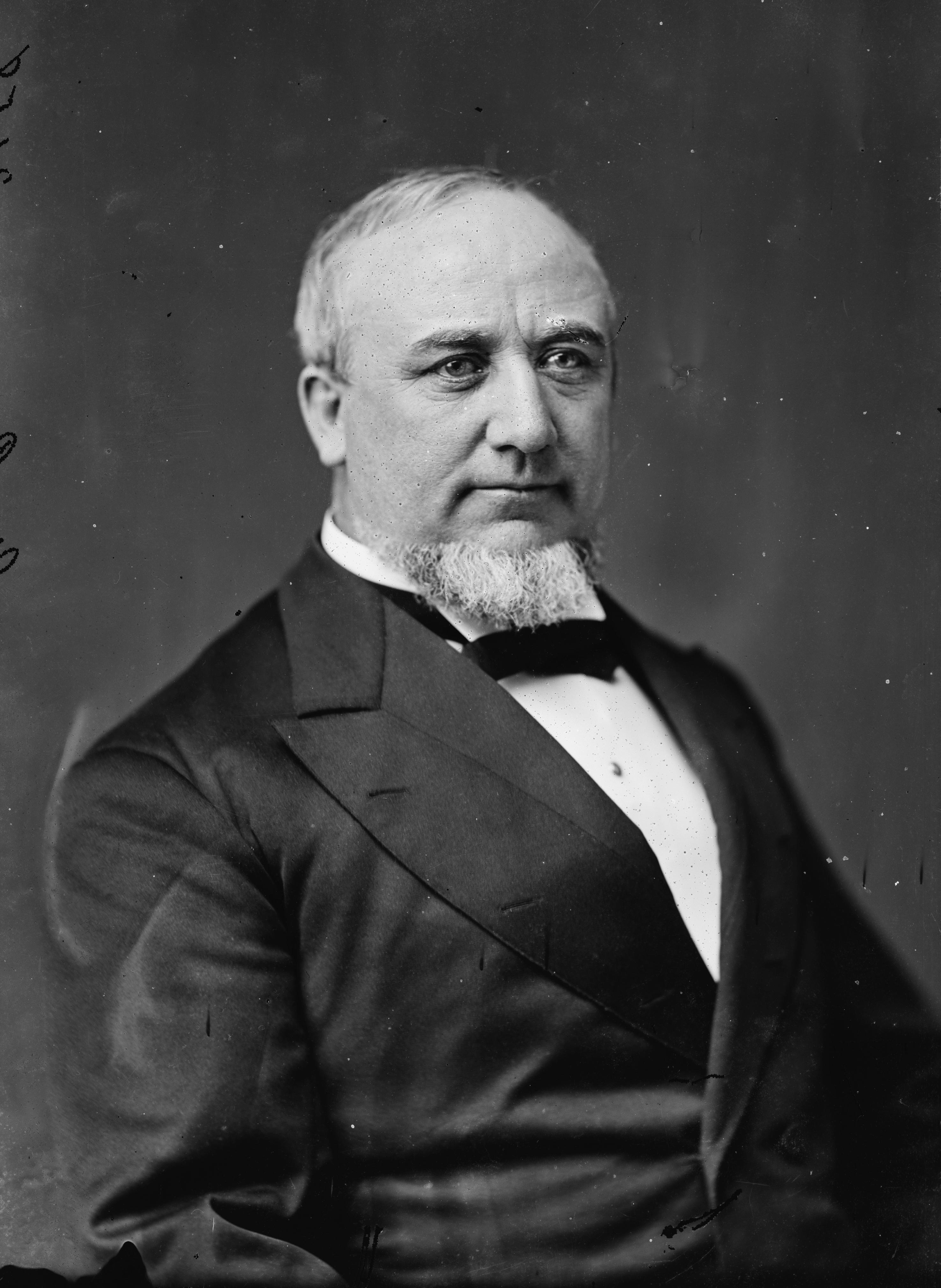
George Q. Cannon, Utah territorial delegate

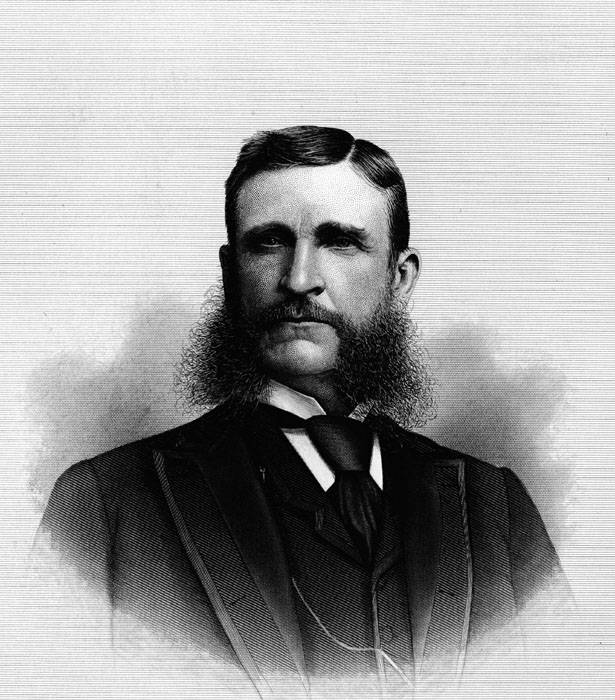
John T. Caine, Utah's longest serving territorial delegate from 1882 to 1893

Congress	Delegate
32nd (1851–1853)	John Milton Bernhisel (I)
33rd (1853–1855)	John Milton Bernhisel (I)
34th (1855–1857)	John Milton Bernhisel (I)
35th (1857–1859)	John Milton Bernhisel (I)
36th (1859–1861)	William Henry Hooper (D)
37th (1861–1863)	John Milton Bernhisel (I)
38th (1863–1865)	John F. Kinney (D)
39th (1865–1867)	William Henry Hooper (D)
40th (1867–1869)	William Henry Hooper (D)
41st (1869–1871)	William Henry Hooper (D)
42nd (1871–1873)	William Henry Hooper (D)
43rd (1873–1875)	George Q. Cannon (D)
44th (1875–1877)	George Q. Cannon (D)
45th (1877–1879)	George Q. Cannon (D)
46th (1879–1881)	George Q. Cannon (D)
47th (1881–1883)	Allen G. Campbell (Lib) (Note: George Q. Cannon won the election, but the governor appointed Allen G. Campbell, who was briefly seated. Cannon successfully contested the election, but the House decided not to seat Cannon on grounds that Cannon was a polygamist.)
47th (1881–1883)	vacant
47th (1881–1883)	John T. Caine (D) (Note: Elected to fill the vacancy created when the House refused to seat George Q. Cannon)
48th (1883–1885)	John T. Caine (D)
49th (1885–1887)	John T. Caine (D)
50th (1887–1889)	John T. Caine (D)
51st (1889–1891)	John T. Caine (Pop.)
52nd (1891–1893)	John T. Caine (Pop.)
53rd (1893–1895)	Joseph L. Rawlins (D)
54th (1895–1897)	Frank J. Cannon (R)

=== United States representatives ===
U.S. representatives are elected every two years by popular vote within a congressional district. From 1895 till 1913, Utah had an at-large congressional district that represented the entire state. Every ten years, the number of congressional districts is reapportioned based on the state's population as determined by the United States census; Utah has had four districts since 2013.

Democratic Republican

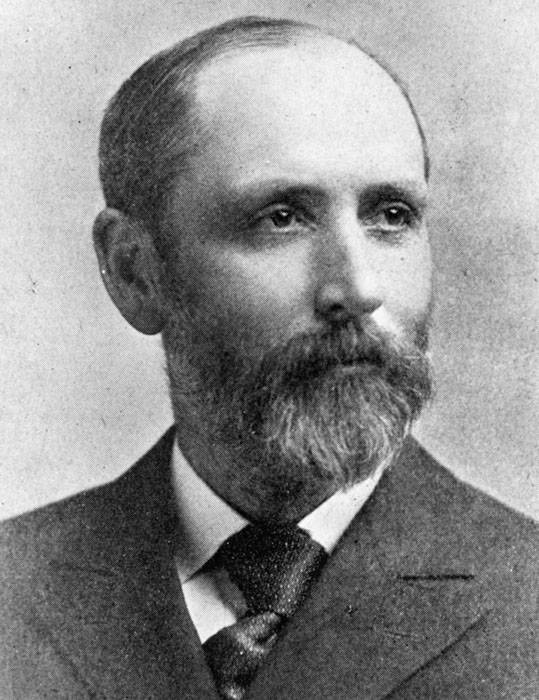
Clarence Emir Allen, Utah's first representative from the State of Utah

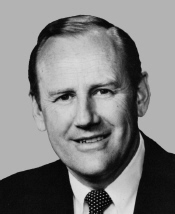
James Hansen, Utah's longest serving representative from 1981 to 2003

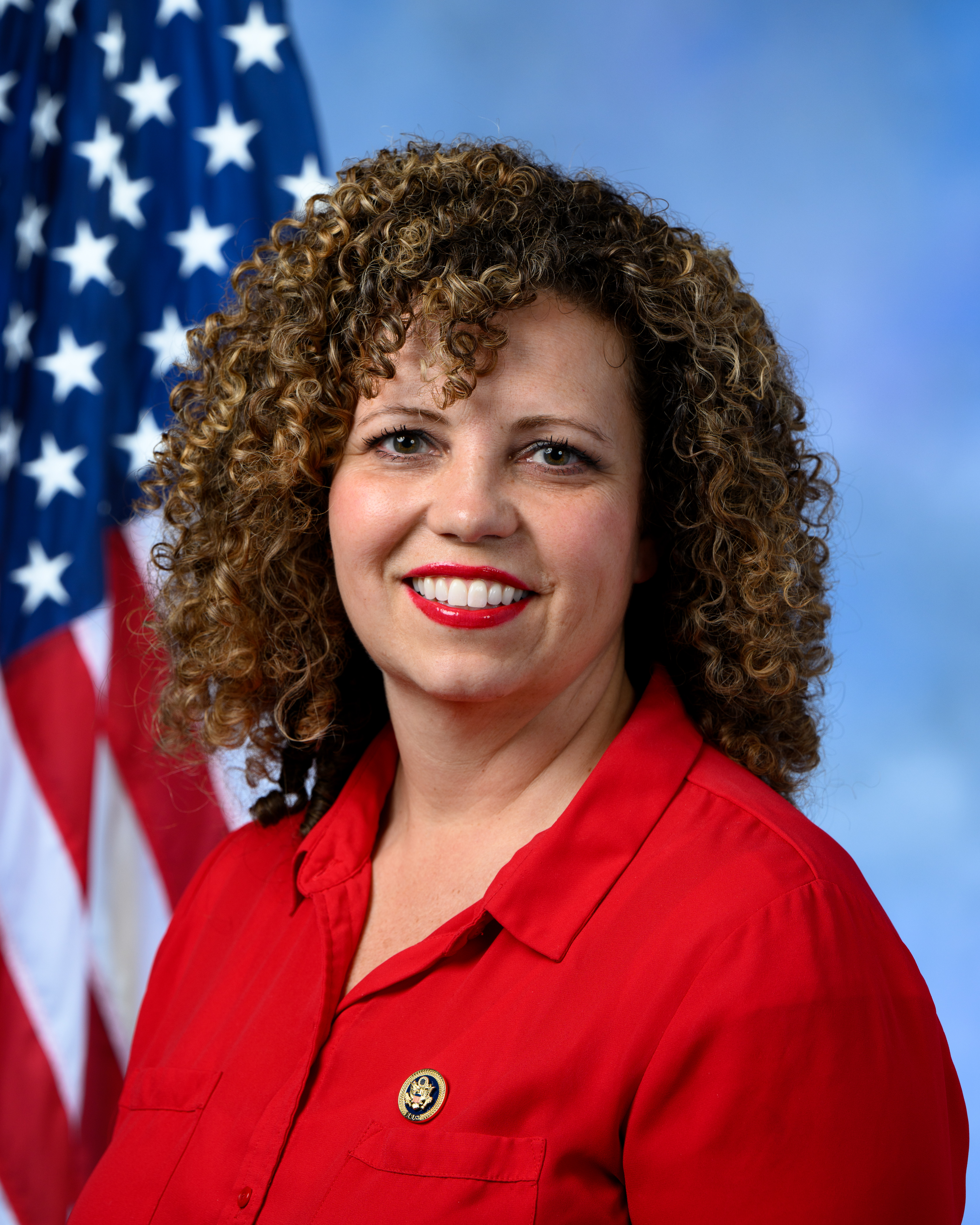
Celeste Maloy, current representative since 2023

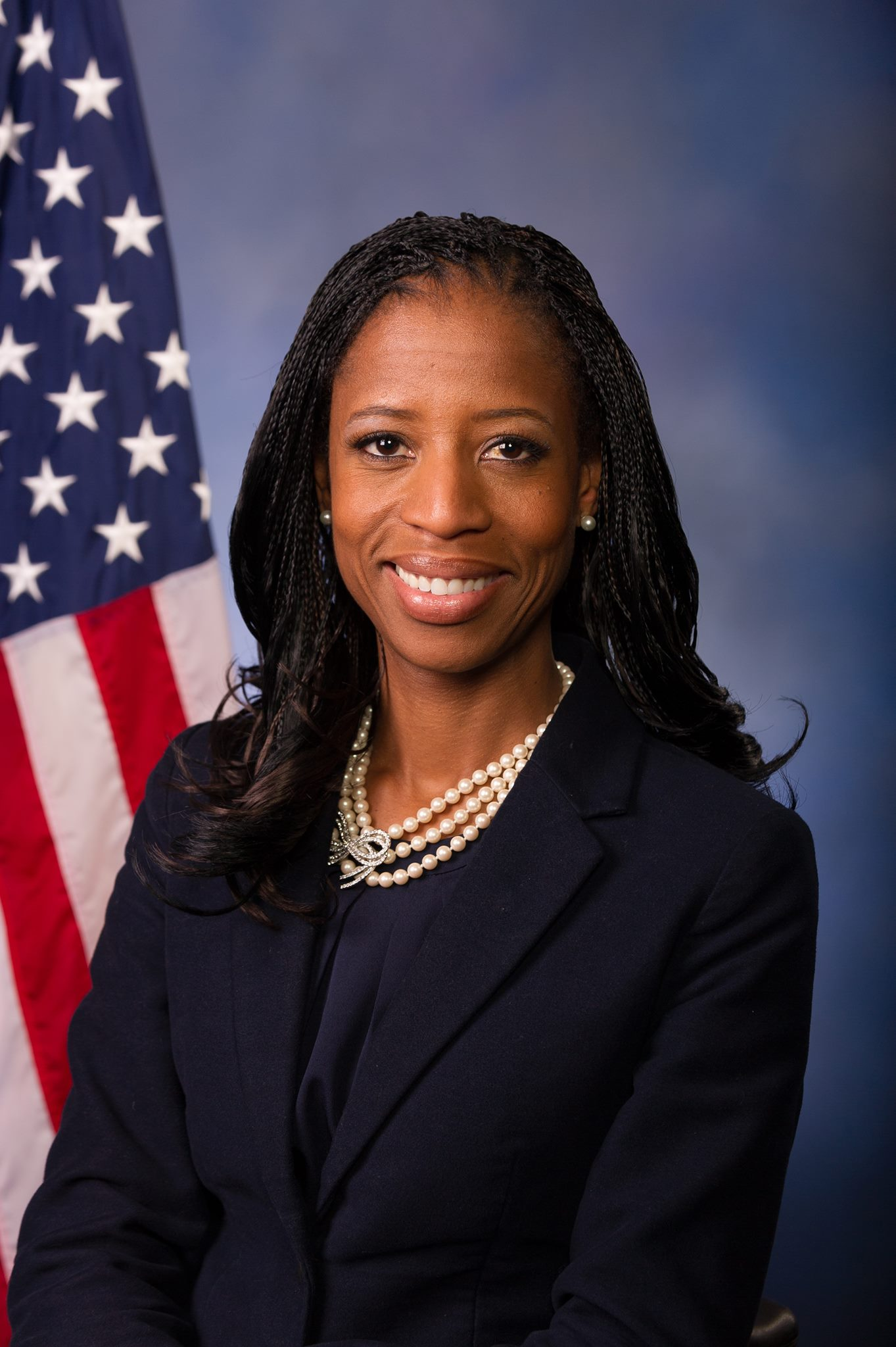
Mia Love, First Black female Republican representative

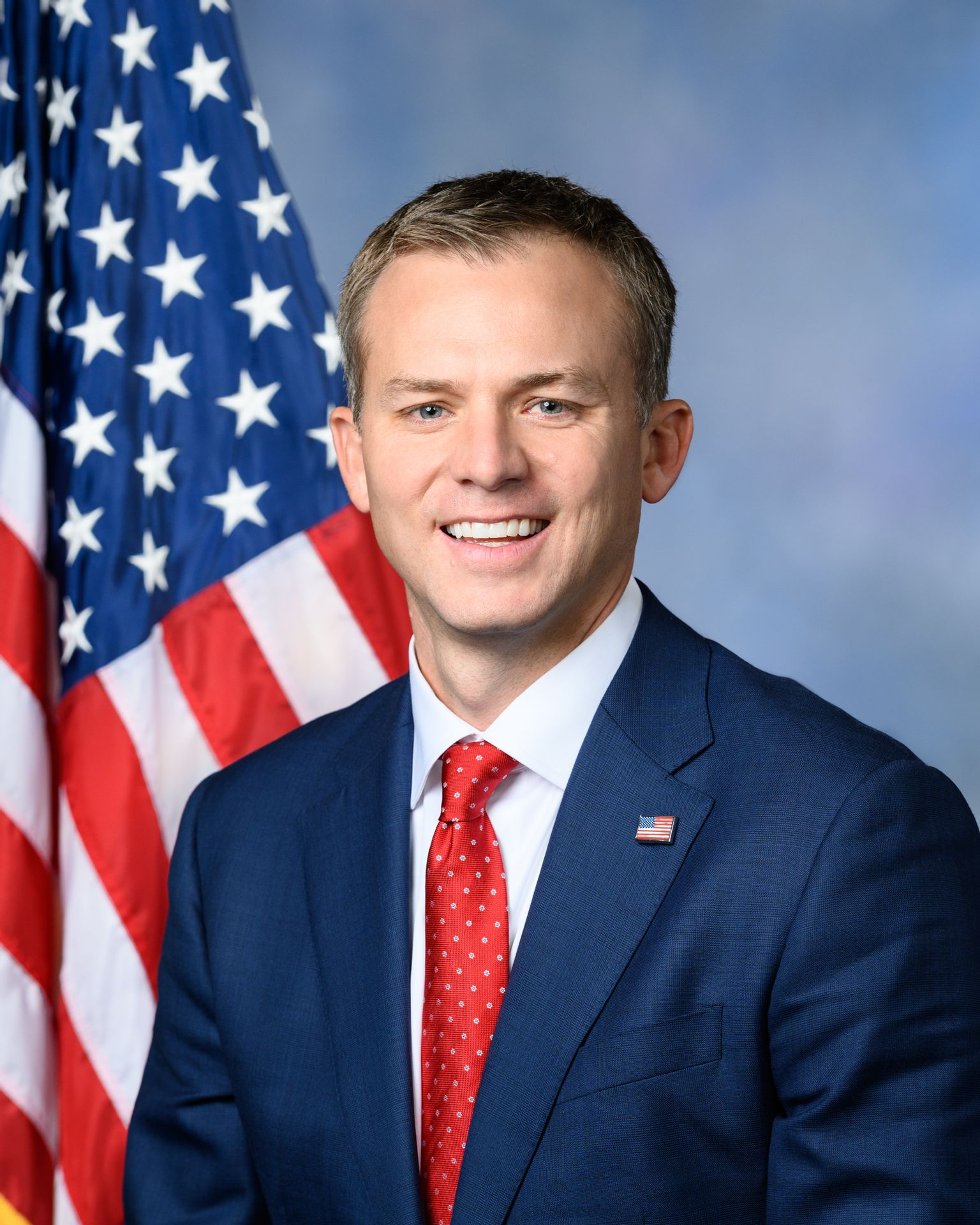
Blake Moore, current representative since 2021

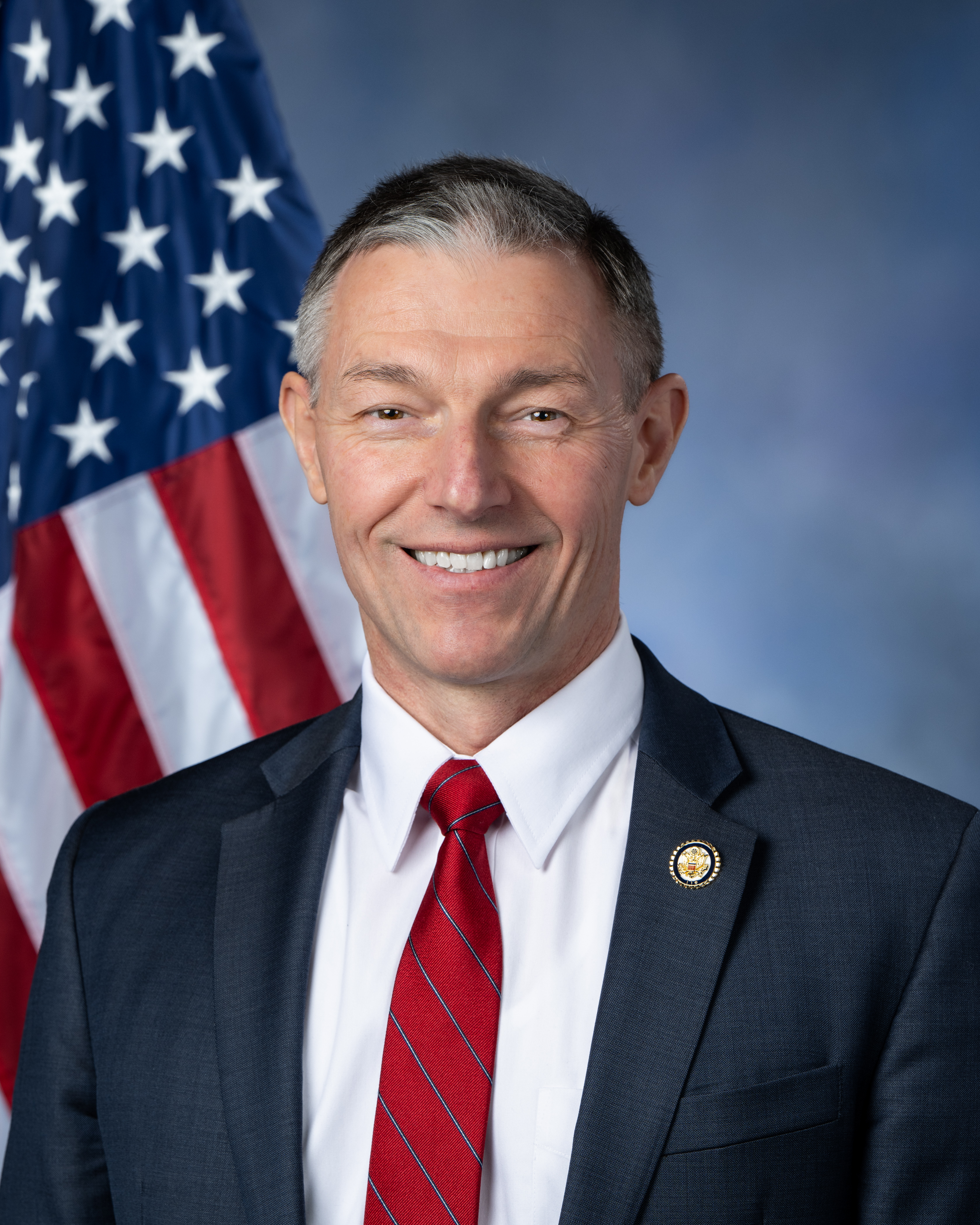
Mike Kennedy, current representative since 2025

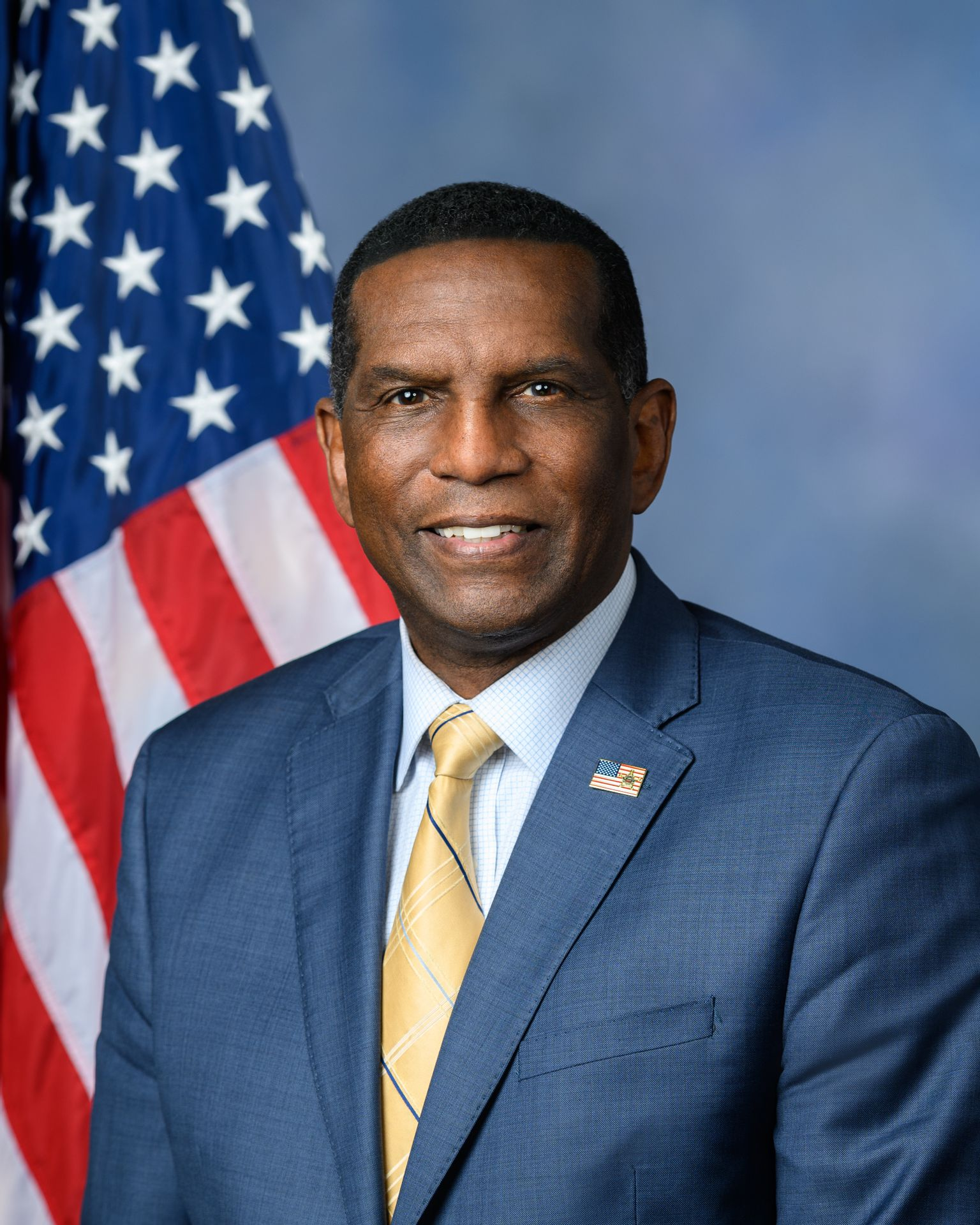
Burgess Owens, current representative since 2021

Congress	Districts			
Congress	At-large	2nd	3rd	4th
54th (1895–1897)	Clarence Emir Allen (R)	2nd	3rd	4th
55th (1897–1899)	William H. King (D)	2nd	3rd	4th
56th (1899–1901)	B. H. Roberts (D) (Note: The House refused to seat Brigham H. Roberts on grounds that he was a polygamist.)	2nd	3rd	4th
56th (1899–1901)	William H. King (D) (Note: Elected to fill the seat vacated by Brigham Roberts)	2nd	3rd	4th
57th (1901–1903)	George Sutherland (R)	2nd	3rd	4th
58th (1903–1905)	Joseph Howell (R)	2nd	3rd	4th
59th (1905–1907)	Joseph Howell (R)	2nd	3rd	4th
60th (1907–1909)	Joseph Howell (R)	2nd	3rd	4th
61st (1909–1911)	Joseph Howell (R)	2nd	3rd	4th
62nd (1911–1913)	Joseph Howell (R)	2nd	3rd	4th
Congress	1st	2nd	3rd	4th
63rd (1913–1915)	Joseph Howell (R)	Jacob Johnson (R)	3rd	4th
64th (1915–1917)	Joseph Howell (R)	James Henry Mays (D)	3rd	4th
65th (1917–1919)	Milton H. Welling (D)	James Henry Mays (D)	3rd	4th
66th (1919–1921)	Milton H. Welling (D)	James Henry Mays (D)	3rd	4th
67th (1921–1923)	Don B. Colton (R)	Elmer O. Leatherwood (R) (Note: Representative Leatherwood died while in office.)	3rd	4th
68th (1923–1925)	Don B. Colton (R)	Elmer O. Leatherwood (R)	3rd	4th
69th (1925–1927)	Don B. Colton (R)	Elmer O. Leatherwood (R)	3rd	4th
70th (1927–1929)	Don B. Colton (R)	Elmer O. Leatherwood (R)	3rd	4th
71st (1929–1931)	Don B. Colton (R)	Elmer O. Leatherwood (R)	3rd	4th
72nd (1931–1933)	Don B. Colton (R)	Frederick C. Loofbourow (R)	3rd	4th
73rd (1933–1935)	Abe Murdock (D)	J. W. Robinson (D)	3rd	4th
74th (1935–1937)	Abe Murdock (D)	J. W. Robinson (D)	3rd	4th
75th (1937–1939)	Abe Murdock (D)	J. W. Robinson (D)	3rd	4th
76th (1939–1941)	Abe Murdock (D)	J. W. Robinson (D)	3rd	4th
77th (1941–1943)	Walter K. Granger (D)	J. W. Robinson (D)	3rd	4th
78th (1943–1945)	Walter K. Granger (D)	J. W. Robinson (D)	3rd	4th
79th (1945–1947)	Walter K. Granger (D)	J. W. Robinson (D)	3rd	4th
80th (1947–1949)	Walter K. Granger (D)	William A. Dawson (R)	3rd	4th
81st (1949–1951)	Walter K. Granger (D)	Reva Beck Bosone (D)	3rd	4th
82nd (1951–1953)	Walter K. Granger (D)	Reva Beck Bosone (D)	3rd	4th
83rd (1953–1955)	Douglas R. Stringfellow (R)	William A. Dawson (R)	3rd	4th
84th (1955–1957)	Henry Aldous Dixon (R)	William A. Dawson (R)	3rd	4th
85th (1957–1959)	Henry Aldous Dixon (R)	William A. Dawson (R)	3rd	4th
86th (1959–1961)	Henry Aldous Dixon (R)	David S. King (D)	3rd	4th
87th (1961–1963)	M. Blaine Peterson (D)	David S. King (D)	3rd	4th
88th (1963–1965)	Laurence J. Burton (R)	Sherman P. Lloyd (R)	3rd	4th
89th (1965–1967)	Laurence J. Burton (R)	David S. King (D)	3rd	4th
90th (1967–1969)	Laurence J. Burton (R)	Sherman P. Lloyd (R)	3rd	4th
91st (1969–1971)	Laurence J. Burton (R)	Sherman P. Lloyd (R)	3rd	4th
92nd (1971–1973)	K. Gunn McKay (D)	Sherman P. Lloyd (R)	3rd	4th
93rd (1973–1975)	K. Gunn McKay (D)	Wayne Owens (D)	3rd	4th
94th (1975–1977)	K. Gunn McKay (D)	Allan Turner Howe (D)	3rd	4th
95th (1977–1979)	K. Gunn McKay (D)	David Daniel Marriott (R)	3rd	4th
96th (1979–1981)	K. Gunn McKay (D)	David Daniel Marriott (R)	3rd	4th
97th (1981–1983)	Jim Hansen (R)	David Daniel Marriott (R)	3rd	4th
98th (1983–1985)	Jim Hansen (R)	David Daniel Marriott (R)	Howard C. Nielson (R)	4th
99th (1985–1987)	Jim Hansen (R)	David Smith Monson (R)	Howard C. Nielson (R)	4th
100th (1987–1989)	Jim Hansen (R)	Wayne Owens (D)	Howard C. Nielson (R)	4th
101st (1989–1991)	Jim Hansen (R)	Wayne Owens (D)	Howard C. Nielson (R)	4th
102nd (1991–1993)	Jim Hansen (R)	Wayne Owens (D)	Bill Orton (D)	4th
103rd (1993–1995)	Jim Hansen (R)	Karen Shepherd (D)	Bill Orton (D)	4th
104th (1995–1997)	Jim Hansen (R)	Enid Greene (R)	Bill Orton (D)	4th
105th (1997–1999)	Jim Hansen (R)	Merrill Cook (R)	Chris Cannon (R)	4th
106th (1999–2001)	Jim Hansen (R)	Merrill Cook (R)	Chris Cannon (R)	4th
107th (2001–2003)	Jim Hansen (R)	Jim Matheson (D)	Chris Cannon (R)	4th
108th (2003–2005)	Rob Bishop (R)	Jim Matheson (D)	Chris Cannon (R)	4th
109th (2005–2007)	Rob Bishop (R)	Jim Matheson (D)	Chris Cannon (R)	4th
110th (2007–2009)	Rob Bishop (R)	Jim Matheson (D)	Chris Cannon (R)	4th
111th (2009–2011)	Rob Bishop (R)	Jim Matheson (D)	Jason Chaffetz (R)	4th
112th (2011–2013)	Rob Bishop (R)	Jim Matheson (D)	Jason Chaffetz (R)	4th
113th (2013–2015)	Rob Bishop (R)	Chris Stewart (R)	Jason Chaffetz (R)	Jim Matheson (D)
114th (2015–2017)	Rob Bishop (R)	Chris Stewart (R)	Jason Chaffetz (R)	Mia Love (R)
115th (2017–2019)	Rob Bishop (R)	Chris Stewart (R)	Jason Chaffetz (R)	Mia Love (R)
115th (2017–2019)	Rob Bishop (R)	Chris Stewart (R)	John Curtis (R)	Mia Love (R)
116th (2019–2021)	Rob Bishop (R)	Chris Stewart (R)	John Curtis (R)	Ben McAdams (D)
117th (2021–2023)	Blake Moore (R)	Chris Stewart (R)	John Curtis (R)	Burgess Owens (R)
118th (2023–2025)	Blake Moore (R)	Chris Stewart (R)	John Curtis (R)	Burgess Owens (R)
118th (2023–2025)	Blake Moore (R)	Celeste Maloy (R)	John Curtis (R)	Burgess Owens (R)
119th (2025–2027)	Blake Moore (R)	Celeste Maloy (R)	Mike Kennedy (R)	Burgess Owens (R)
120th (2027–2029)	Ben McAdams (D)	Blake Moore (R)	Celeste Maloy (D)	Mike Kennedy (R)
Congress	1st	2nd	3rd	4th
Congress	Districts			

== See also ==
- List of United States congressional districts
- Utah's congressional districts
- Political party strength in Utah
