= Treaty of Paris (1898) =

Treaty ending the Spanish–American War

Treaty of Peace between the United States of America and the Kingdom of Spain
- Type: Peace treaty
- Signed: December 10, 1898
- Location: Paris, France
- Effective: April 11, 1899
- Condition: Exchange of ratifications
- Parties: Spain; United States
- Citations: 30 Stat. 1754; TS 343; 11 Bevans 615
- Languages: Spanish; English

Full text
- Treaty of Paris (1898) at Wikisource
- Article IX amended by protocol of March 29, 1900 (TS 344; 11 Bevans 622). Article III supplemented by convention of November 7, 1900 (TS 345; 11 Bevans 623).

The Treaty of Peace between the United States of America and the Kingdom of Spain, commonly known as the Treaty of Paris of 1898, (Note: Spanish: Tratado de París de 1898; Filipino: Kasunduan sa Paris ng 1898) was signed by Spain and the United States on December 10, 1898, and marked the official end of the Spanish–American War. Under it, Spain relinquished all claim of sovereignty over the West Indies archipelagos and islands of Cuba and Puerto Rico in the Caribbean, the Western Pacific island of Guam in the Mariana Islands in Micronesia, and the Western Pacific archipelago of the Philippines in Southeast Asia to the United States. The cession of the Philippines involved a compensation of $20 million (Note: One million dollars then amounts to $38,700,000 today.) from the United States to Spain.

The treaty was preceded by the Spanish-American War armistice, a preliminary peace agreement signed on August 12, 1898, in Washington, DC. The armistice formally stopped the active hostilities between Spain and the United States, requiring Spain to cede Cuba, Puerto Rico, and Guam to the United States, and to agree to the American occupation of Manila in the Philippines. The treaty came into effect on April 11, 1899, when the documents of ratification were exchanged. It was the first treaty negotiated between the two governments since the 1819 Adams–Onís Treaty.

The Treaty of Paris marked the end of the Spanish Empire, apart from some small holdings. It had a major cultural impact in Spain known as the "Generation of '98". It marked the beginning of the United States as a world power. In the U.S., many supporters of the war opposed the treaty, which became one of the major issues in the election of 1900 when it was opposed by Democrat William Jennings Bryan, who opposed imperialism. Republican President William McKinley supported the treaty and was reelected.

== Background ==
The Spanish–American War began on April 25, 1898, due to a series of escalating disputes between the two nations, and ended on December 10, 1898, with the signing of the Treaty of Paris. It resulted in Spain's loss of its control over the remains of its overseas empire. After much of mainland in the Americas had achieved independence, Cubans tried their hand at revolution in 1868–1878, and again in the 1890s, led by José Martí. The Philippines at this time also became resistant to Spanish colonial rule. August 26, 1896, presented the first call to revolt, led by Andrés Bonifacio, succeeded by Emilio Aguinaldo y Famy. Aguinaldo then negotiated the Pact of Biak-na-Bato with the Spaniards and went into exile to Hong Kong along with the other revolutionary leaders.

The Spanish–American War that followed had overwhelming public support in the United States due to the popular fervor towards supporting Cuban freedom.

On September 16, President William McKinley issued secret written instructions to his emissaries as the Spanish–American War drew to a close:

By a protocol signed at Washington August 12, 1898 . . . it was agreed that the United States and Spain would each appoint not more than five commissioners to treat of peace, and that the commissioners so appointed should meet at Paris not later than October 1, 1898, and proceed to the negotiation and conclusion of a treaty of peace, which treaty should be subject to ratification according to the respective constitutional forms of the two countries.

For the purpose of carrying into effect this stipulation, I have appointed you as commissioners on the part of the United States to meet and confer with commissioners on the part of Spain.

As an essential preliminary to the agreement to appoint commissioners to treat of peace, this government required of that of Spain the unqualified concession of the following precise demands:

- The relinquishment of all claim of sovereignty over and title to Cuba.
- The cession to the United States of Puerto Rico and other islands under Spanish sovereignty in the West Indies.
- The cession of an island in the Ladrones, to be selected by the United States.
- The immediate evacuation by Spain of Cuba, Puerto Rico, and other Spanish islands in the West Indies.
- The occupation by the United States of the city, bay, and harbor of Manila pending the conclusion of a treaty of peace which should determine the control, disposition, and government of the Philippines.

These demands were conceded by Spain, and their concession was, as you will perceive, solemnly recorded in the protocol of the 12th of August. . . .

It is my wish that throughout the negotiations entrusted to the Commission the purpose and spirit with which the United States accepted the unwelcome necessity of war should be kept constantly in view. We took up arms only in obedience to the dictates of humanity and in the fulfillment of high public and moral obligations. We had no design of aggrandizement and no ambition of conquest. Through the long course of repeated representations which preceded and aimed to avert the struggle, and in the final arbitrament of force, this country was impelled solely by the purpose of relieving grievous wrongs and removing long-existing conditions which disturbed its tranquillity, which shocked the moral sense of mankind, and which could no longer be endured.

It is my earnest wish that the United States in making peace should follow the same high rule of conduct which guided it in facing war. It should be as scrupulous and magnanimous in the concluding settlement as it was just and humane in its original action. The luster and the moral strength attaching to a cause which can be confidently rested upon the considerate judgment of the world should not under any illusion of the hour be dimmed by ulterior designs which might tempt us into excessive demands or into an adventurous departure on untried paths. It is believed that the true glory and the enduring interests of the country will most surely be served if an unselfish duty conscientiously accepted and a signal triumph honorably achieved shall be crowned by such an example of moderation, restraint, and reason in victory as best comports with the traditions and character of our enlightened republic.

Our aim in the adjustment of peace should be directed to lasting results and to the achievement of the common good under the demands of civilization, rather than to ambitious designs. The terms of the protocol were framed upon this consideration. The abandonment of the Western Hemisphere by Spain was an imperative necessity. In presenting that requirement, we only fulfilled a duty universally acknowledged. It involves no ungenerous reference to our recent foe, but simply a recognition of the plain teachings of history, to say that it was not compatible with the assurance of permanent peace on and near our own territory that the Spanish flag should remain on this side of the sea. This lesson of events and of reason left no alternative as to Cuba, Puerto Rico, and the other islands belonging to Spain in this hemisphere.

The Philippines stand upon a different basis. It is nonetheless true, however, that without any original thought of complete or even partial acquisition, the presence and success of our arms at Manila imposes upon us obligations which we cannot disregard. The march of events rules and overrules human action. Avowing unreservedly the purpose which has animated all our effort, and still solicitous to adhere to it, we cannot be unmindful that, without any desire or design on our part, the war has brought us new duties and responsibilities which we must meet and discharge as becomes a great nation on whose growth and career from the beginning the ruler of nations has plainly written the high command and pledge of civilization.

Incidental to our tenure in the Philippines is the commercial opportunity to which American statesmanship cannot be indifferent. It is just to use every legitimate means for the enlargement of American trade; but we seek no advantages in the Orient which are not common to all. Asking only the open door for ourselves, we are ready to accord the open door to others. The commercial opportunity which is naturally and inevitably associated with this new opening depends less on large territorial possession than upon an adequate commercial basis and upon broad and equal privileges. . . .

In view of what has been stated, the United States cannot accept less than the cession in full right and sovereignty of the island of Luzon. It is desirable, however, that the United States shall acquire the right of entry for vessels and merchandise belonging to citizens of the United States into such ports of the Philippines as are not ceded to the United States upon terms of equal favor with Spanish ships and merchandise, both in relation to port and customs charges and rates of trade and commerce, together with other rights of protection and trade accorded to citizens of one country within the territory of another. You are therefore instructed to demand such concession, agreeing on your part that Spain shall have similar rights as to her subjects and vessels in the ports of any territory in the Philippines ceded to the United States.

== Negotiations ==
Article V of the peace protocol between United States and Spain on August 12, 1898, read as follows:

The United States and Spain will each appoint not more than five commissioners to treat of peace, and the commissioners so appointed shall meet at Paris not later than Oct. 1, 1898, and proceed to the negotiation and conclusion of a treaty of peace, which treaty shall be subject to ratification according to the respective constitutional forms of the two countries.

The composition of the American commission was somewhat unusual in that three of its members were senators, which meant, as many newspapers pointed out, that they would later vote on the ratification of their own negotiations. These were American delegation's members:

- William R. Day, chairman, who had resigned as U.S. Secretary of State to lead the commission
- William P. Frye, a senator from Maine
- Cushman Kellogg Davis, a senator from Minnesota
- George Gray, a senator from Delaware
- Whitelaw Reid, a former diplomat and a former nominee for Vice President

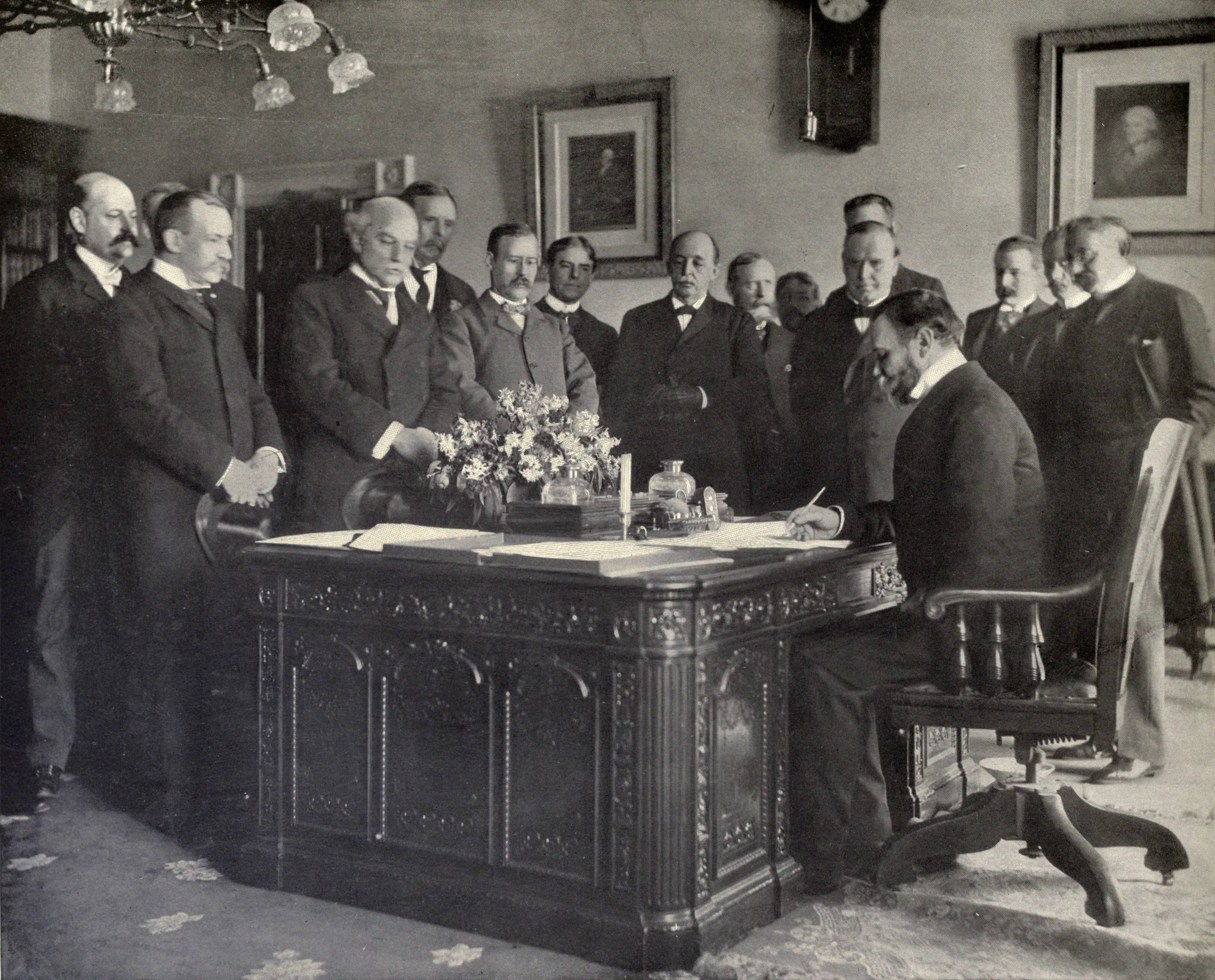
John Hay, Secretary of State, signing the memorandum of ratification on behalf of the United States

The Spanish commission included the following Spanish diplomats:

- Eugenio Montero Ríos,
- Buenaventura de Abarzuza,
- José de Garnica,
- Wenceslao Ramírez de Villa-Urrutia,
- Rafael Cerero, and
- Jules Cambon (French diplomat).

The American delegation, headed by former Secretary of State William R. Day, who had vacated his position as U.S. Secretary of State to head the commission, arrived in Paris on September 26, 1898. The negotiations were conducted in a suite of rooms at the Ministry of Foreign Affairs. At the first session, on October 1, the Spanish demanded that before the talks got underway, the return of the city of Manila, which had been captured by the Americans a few hours after the signing of the peace protocol in Washington, to Spanish authority. The Americans refused to consider the idea and, for the moment, it was pursued no further.

Felipe Agoncillo, a Filipino lawyer who represented the First Philippine Republic, was denied participation in the negotiation.

For almost a month, negotiations revolved around Cuba. The Teller Amendment to the declaration of war made it impractical for the United States to annex the island as it had with Puerto Rico, Guam, and the Philippines. At first, Spain refused to accept the Cuban national debt of $400 million, but ultimately, it had no choice. Eventually, it was agreed that Cuba was to be granted independence and for the Cuban debt to be assumed by Spain. It was also agreed that Spain would cede Guam and Puerto Rico to the United States.

The negotiators then turned to the question of the Philippines. Spanish negotiators were determined to hang onto all they could and hoped to cede only Mindanao and perhaps the Sulu Islands. On the American side, Chairman Day had once recommended the acquisition of only the naval base in Manila, as a "hitching post." Others had recommended retaining only the island of Luzon. However, in discussions with its advisers, the commission concluded that Spain, if it retained part of the Philippines, would be likely to sell it to another European power, which would likely be troublesome for America. On November 25, the American Commission cabled McKinley for explicit instructions. Their cable crossed one from McKinley saying that duty left him no choice but to demand the entire archipelago. The next morning, another cable from McKinley arrived:

to accept merely Luzon, leaving the rest of the islands subject to Spanish rule, or to be the subject of future contention, cannot be justified on political, commercial, or humanitarian grounds. The cessation must be the whole archipelago or none. The latter is wholly inadmissible, and the former must therefore be required.

This position was proposed by U.S. negotiators, though they considered it unsound, and was formally rejected on November 4. Spain was in distressed financial condition, and was responsible for considerable Cuban debt, having been sovereign when the debts were incurred. Estimating U.S. costs in the war at $300 million and regarding Porto Rico (Note: Puerto Rico is spelled as "Porto Rico" in the treaty.) as worth only a fraction of that, the negotiators favored acquisition of the Philippines as indemnity for the balance. Seeking a solution to avoid collapse of the negotiations, Senator Frye suggested offering Spain $10 or $20 million, describing the purpose as the assumption of existing debts incurred for improvements of a pacific nature. The State Department approved, though it considered this odious. After some discussion, the American delegation offered $20 million on November 21, one tenth of a valuation that had been estimated in internal discussions in October, and requested an answer within two days. Montero Ríos said angrily that he could reply at once, but the American delegation had already departed from the conference table. When the two sides met again, Queen-Regent Maria Christina had cabled her acceptance. Montero Ríos then recited his formal reply:

The Government of Her Majesty, moved by lofty reasons of patriotism and humanity, will not assume the responsibility of again bringing upon Spain all the horrors of war. In order to avoid them, it resigns itself to the painful task of submitting to the law of the victor, however harsh it may be, and as Spain lacks the material means to defend the rights she believes hers, having recorded them, she accepts the only terms the United States offers her for the concluding of the treaty of peace.

Work on the final draft of the treaty began on November 30. It was signed on December 10, 1898.

== Ratification ==
=== Spanish ratification ===
In Madrid, the Cortes Generales, Spain's legislature, rejected the treaty, but Maria Christina signed it as she was empowered to do by a clause in the Spanish constitution.

=== U.S. ratification ===
George F. Hoar (MA-R) (left), Eugene Hale (ME-R) (center), and George G. Vest (MO-D) (right) led the opposition to the ratification of the Treaty of Paris within the Senate.

In the Senate, there were four main schools of thought on U.S. imperialism that influenced the debate on the treaty's ratification. Republicans generally supported the treaty, but those opposed either aimed to defeat the treaty or exclude the provision that stipulated the acquisition of the Philippines. Most Democrats, particularly in the South, opposed expansion. A minority of Democrats also favored the treaty on the basis of ending the war and granting independence to Cuba and the Philippines. During the Senate debate on ratification, Senators George Frisbie Hoar and George Graham Vest were outspoken opponents. Hoar stated:

This Treaty will make us a vulgar, commonplace empire, controlling subject races and vassal states, in which one class must forever rule and other classes must forever obey.

Some anti-expansionists stated that the treaty committed the United States to a course of empire and violated the most basic tenets of the constitution. They argued that neither the Congress nor the President had the right to pass laws that governed colonial peoples who were not represented by lawmakers.

Some Senate expansionists supported the treaty and reinforced such views by arguing:

Suppose we reject the Treaty. We continue the state of war. We repudiate the President. We are branded as a people incapable of taking rank as one of the greatest of world powers!

— Senator Henry Cabot Lodge

Providence has given the United States the duty of extending Christian civilization. We come as ministering angels, not despots.

— Senator Knute Nelson

Expansionists said that the Constitution applied only to citizens, an idea that was later supported by the Supreme Court in the Insular Cases.

As the Senate debate continued, Andrew Carnegie and former President Grover Cleveland petitioned the Senate to reject the treaty. Both men adamantly opposed such imperialist policies and participated in the American Anti-Imperialist League, along with other such prominent members as Mark Twain and Samuel Gompers.

Fighting erupted between Filipino and American forces in Manila on February 4, and quickly escalated into a battle between armies. This changed the course of debate in the Senate in favor of ratification. The treaty was eventually approved on February 6, 1899, by a vote of 57 to 27, just over the two-thirds majority required. Only two Republicans voted against ratification: George Frisbie Hoar of Massachusetts and Eugene Pryor Hale of Maine. Senator Nelson W. Aldrich had opposed entry into the Spanish–American War but supported McKinley after it began. He played a central role in winning the treaty's two-thirds majority ratification.

Vote to pass the resolution to ratify the Treaty of Paris
February 6, 1899	Party					Total votes
February 6, 1899	Democratic	Republican	Silver Republican	Populist	Silver	Total votes
Yea	10	39	2	4	2	57
Nay	22	2	2	1	0	27
Not voting	2	3	1	0	0	6
Result: Ratified
Roll call vote on ratification: Senator / Party / State / Vote; Nelson W. Aldrich / R / Rhode Island / Yea; William V. Allen / P / Nebraska / Yea; William B. Allison / R / Iowa / Yea; Augustus O. Bacon / D / Georgia / Nay; Lucien Baker / R / Kansas / Yea; William B. Bate / D / Tennessee / Nay; James H. Berry / D / Arkansas / Nay; Julius C. Burrows / R / Michigan / Yea; Marion Butler / P / North Carolina / Yea; Donelson Caffery / D / Louisiana / Nay; Frank J. Cannon / SR / Utah / Not voting; Thomas H. Carter / R / Montana / Yea; William E. Chandler / R / New Hampshire / Yea; Horace Chilton / D / Texas / Nay; Clarence D. Clark / R / Wyoming / Yea; Alexander S. Clay / D / Georgia / Yea; Francis M. Cockrell / D / Missouri / Nay; Shelby M. Cullom / R / Illinois / Yea; John W. Daniel / D / Virginia / Nay; Cushman K. Davis / R / Minnesota / Yea; William J. Deboe / R / Kentucky / Yea; Stephen B. Elkins / R / West Virginia / Yea; Charles W. Fairbanks / R / Indiana / Yea; Charles James Faulkner / D / West Virginia / Yea; Joseph B. Foraker / R / Ohio / Yea; William P. Frye / R / Maine / Yea; Jacob H. Gallinger / R / New Hampshire / Yea; John H. Gear / R / Iowa / Yea; Arthur P. Gorman / D / Maryland / Nay; George Gray / D / Delaware / Yea; Eugene Hale / R / Maine / Nay; Mark Hanna / R / Ohio / Yea; Henry C. Hansbrough / R / North Dakota / Yea; William A. Harris / P / Kansas / Yea; Joseph R. Hawley / R / Connecticut / Yea; Henry Heitfeld / P / Idaho / Nay; George F. Hoar / R / Massachusetts / Nay; James K. Jones / D / Arkansas / Nay; John P. Jones / S / Nevada / Yea; Richard R. Kenney / D / Delaware / Yea; James H. Kyle / P / South Dakota / Yea; William Lindsay / D / Kentucky / Yea; Henry Cabot Lodge / R / Massachusetts / Yea; Stephen R. Mallory Jr. / D / Florida / Nay; Lee Mantle / SR / Montana / Yea; Thomas S. Martin / D / Virginia / Nay; William E. Mason / R / Illinois / Yea; George W. McBride / R / Oregon / Yea; Samuel D. McEnery / D / Louisiana / Yea; John L. McLaurin / D / South Carolina / Yea; James McMillan / R / Michigan / Yea; Roger Q. Mills / D / Texas / Nay; John L. Mitchell / D / Wisconsin / Nay; Hernando D. Money / D / Mississippi / Nay; John T. Morgan / D / Alabama / Yea; Edward Murphy Jr. / D / New York / Nay; Knute Nelson / R / Minnesota / Yea; Samuel Pasco / D / Florida / Nay; Boies Penrose / R / Pennsylvania / Yea; George C. Perkins / R / California / Yea; Richard F. Pettigrew / SR / South Dakota / Nay; Edmund W. Pettus / D / Alabama / Yea; Orville Platt / R / Connecticut / Yea; Thomas C. Platt / R / New York / Yea; Jeter C. Pritchard / R / North Carolina / Yea; Redfield Proctor / R / Vermont / Not voting; Matthew S. Quay / R / Pennsylvania / Yea; Joseph L. Rawlins / D / Utah / Nay; William N. Roach / D / North Dakota / Nay; Jonathan Ross / R / Vermont / Yea; William J. Sewell / R / New Jersey / Yea; George L. Shoup / R / Idaho / Yea; Joseph Simon / R / Oregon / Yea; James Smith Jr. / D / New Jersey / Nay; John C. Spooner / R / Wisconsin / Yea; William M. Stewart / S / Nevada / Yea; William V. Sullivan / D / Mississippi / Yea; Henry M. Teller / SR / Colorado / Yea; John M. Thurston / R / Nebraska / Yea; Benjamin Tillman / D / South Carolina / Nay; Thomas B. Turley / D / Tennessee / Nay; George Turner / SR / Washington / Nay; David Turpie / D / Indiana / Not voting; George G. Vest / D / Missouri / Nay; Francis E. Warren / R / Wyoming / Yea; George L. Wellington / R / Maryland / Yea; George P. Wetmore / R / Rhode Island / Not voting; Stephen M. White / D / California / Not voting; John L. Wilson / R / Washington / Not voting; Edward O. Wolcott / R / Colorado / Yea

Pairing of absences
Senators that supported ratification	Senators that opposed ratification
Frank J. Cannon (SR–UT)	Stephen M. White (D–CA)
John L. Wilson (R–WA)	Stephen M. White (D–CA)
Redfield Proctor (R–VT)	David Turpie (D–IN)
George P. Wetmore (R–RI)	David Turpie (D–IN)

== Provisions ==
The Treaty of Paris provided for the independence of Cuba from Spain, but the U.S. Congress ensured indirect U.S. control by the Platt Amendment and the Teller Amendment. Spain relinquished all claims of sovereignty over and title to Cuba. Upon Spain's departure, Cuba was to be occupied by the United States, which would assume and discharge any obligations of international law by its occupation.

The treaty also specified that Spain would cede Puerto Rico and the other islands under Spanish sovereignty in the West Indies as well as the island of Guam in the Mariana Islands to the United States.

Boundary of the Philippines based on Treaty of Paris (1898) shown in green lines

The treaty also specified that Spain would cede the Philippine Islands, including the islands within a specified line, to the United States in exchange for $20 million.

Specifics of the cession of the Philippines were later clarified on November 7, 1900, when Spain and the United States signed the Treaty of Washington. This clarified that the territories relinquished by Spain to the United States included any and all islands belonging to the Philippine Archipelago, but lying outside the lines described in the Treaty of Paris. That treaty explicitly named the islands of Cagayan Sulu and Sibutu and their dependencies as among the relinquished territories. The boundary between the Philippines and North Borneo was further clarified by the Convention Between the United States and Great Britain (1930).

== Aftermath ==
=== In the United States ===
Victory in the Spanish–American War turned the United States into a world power because the attainment of the territories of Guam, Puerto Rico, and the Philippines expanded its economic dominance in the Pacific. Its growth continued to have effects on U.S. foreign and economic policy well into the next century. Furthermore, McKinley's significant role in advancing the ratification of the treaty transformed the presidential office from a weaker position to a prototype of the stronger presidency that is more seen today.

=== In Spain ===
The Generation of '98 in Spain comprised those Spanish writers deeply impacted by the events and committed to cultural and aesthetic renewal. They were associated with modernism. The term refers to the moral, political and social crisis in Spain produced by the humiliating loss of the worldwide empire. The intellectuals are known for their criticism of the Spanish literary and educational establishments, which they saw as steeped in conformism, ignorance, and a lack of any true spirit. Their criticism was coupled with and heavily connected to the group's dislike for the Restoration Movement that was occurring in Spanish government.

A few years after the war, during the reign of Alfonso XIII, Spain improved its commercial position and maintained close relations with the United States, which led to the signing of commercial treaties between the two countries in 1902, 1906 and 1910. Spain would turn its attention to its possessions in Africa (especially northern Morocco, Spanish Sahara and Spanish Guinea) and would begin to rehabilitate itself internationally after the Algeciras Conference of 1906.

=== In the Philippines ===
Philippine revolutionaries had declared independence from Spain on June 12, 1898, and continued to resist the imposition of American sovereignty. On August 12, 1898, representatives of Spain and the US concluded a peace protocol in Washington D.C., suspending hostilities. Article 3 of that agreement specified, "The United States shall occupy and hold the City, Bay. and harbour of Manila, pending the conclusion of a treaty of peace which shall determine the control, disposition, and government of the Philippines." Representatives of Spain and the U.S. concluded the treaty in Paris on December 10, ending the war between them. Article 3 ceded the Philippines from Spain to the U.S.

The 1899 Battle of Manila between American and Filipino troops on February 4–5, 1899, then ignited the Philippine-American War, which concluded with an American victory in 1902. In the meantime, Spain and the U.S. exchanged treaty ratifications on April 11, 1899, completing the passage of Philippine sovereignty to the U.S.

==== In Mindanao ====
The United States fought long brutal wars against the Moro sultanates in Mindanao from 1899 to 1913. It annexed the Sultanate of Maguindanao and the Confederation of sultanates in Lanao in 1905 after the Battle of the Malalag River and then annexed the Sultanate of Sulu in 1913 after the Battle of Bud Bagsak.

=== In Puerto Rico ===
The armistice of August 12, 1898, which served as the basis for the Treaty of Paris, established that the peace commissioners would be appointed exclusively by the United States and Spain, with no provision for Puerto Rican representation. The five American commissioners began their work in Paris on September 30, 1898, while Puerto Rico's political leadership—then still formally governing the island under the Autonomous Charter of 1897—remained in San Juan with no role in the negotiations that would determine the island's sovereignty.

During the weeks between the armistice and the formal transfer of Puerto Rico, the island's autonomous government took no collective action to seek representation in Paris or to articulate Puerto Rican interests before the negotiating parties. On October 13, 1898—while the American commissioners in Paris were debating the disposition of Spain's colonial territories—Luis Muñoz Rivera dissolved the Partido Liberal Fusionista de Puerto Rico, citing the need to "facilitate the work of the American government." Two days earlier, on October 11, the Partido Autonomista Ortodoxo had also dissolved. With both major political organizations disbanded before the treaty was signed on December 10, 1898, Puerto Rican civil society entered the post-treaty period without organized political representation.

== See also ==
- Puerto Rico campaign
- German–Spanish Treaty (1899)
- Kiram–Bates Treaty
- Island of Palmas case
