= Campbell College (Kansas) =

Defunct college in Kansas, United States

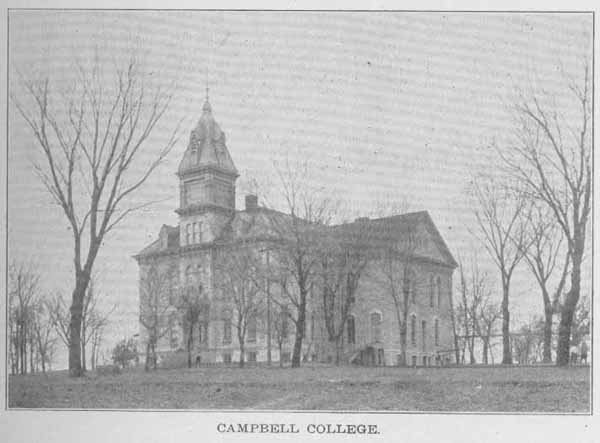
Photo of Campbell College in Holton, Kansas

Campbell College was a college in Holton, Kansas, United States named after Allen Green Campbell. It opened in 1882 and closed in 1933.

== Location ==
Campbell College was situated in the northern part of the town of Holton, Jackson County, Kansas in northeast Kansas.

Local poet, author, journalist, librarian, and suffragist, Elizabeth Barr Arthur described the area in her 1907 publication "Business Directory and History of Jackson County" as situated "on an eminence commanding a fine view of the surrounding country. It has a beautiful campus, across the street from which is the dormitory."

== Founding ==
Local community members became interested in "establishing an institution of higher education" and coordinated a community meeting in 1879 to evaluate the feasibility of such a venture. They elected a committee to explore funding sources and to reach out to potential benefactors.

The committee reached out to Allen Green Campbell, a wealthy Utah mine owner and a former Jackson County, Kansas, resident who was one of the earliest settlers there. Campbell agreed to match up to $20,000 and $10,000 was raised locally by generous community members.

Campbell also contributed an additional $1,100 for the purchase of eleven acres for the campus and in 1880 construction began on "a fine stone building."

The original name for the institution was Campbell Normal University and later Campbell University.

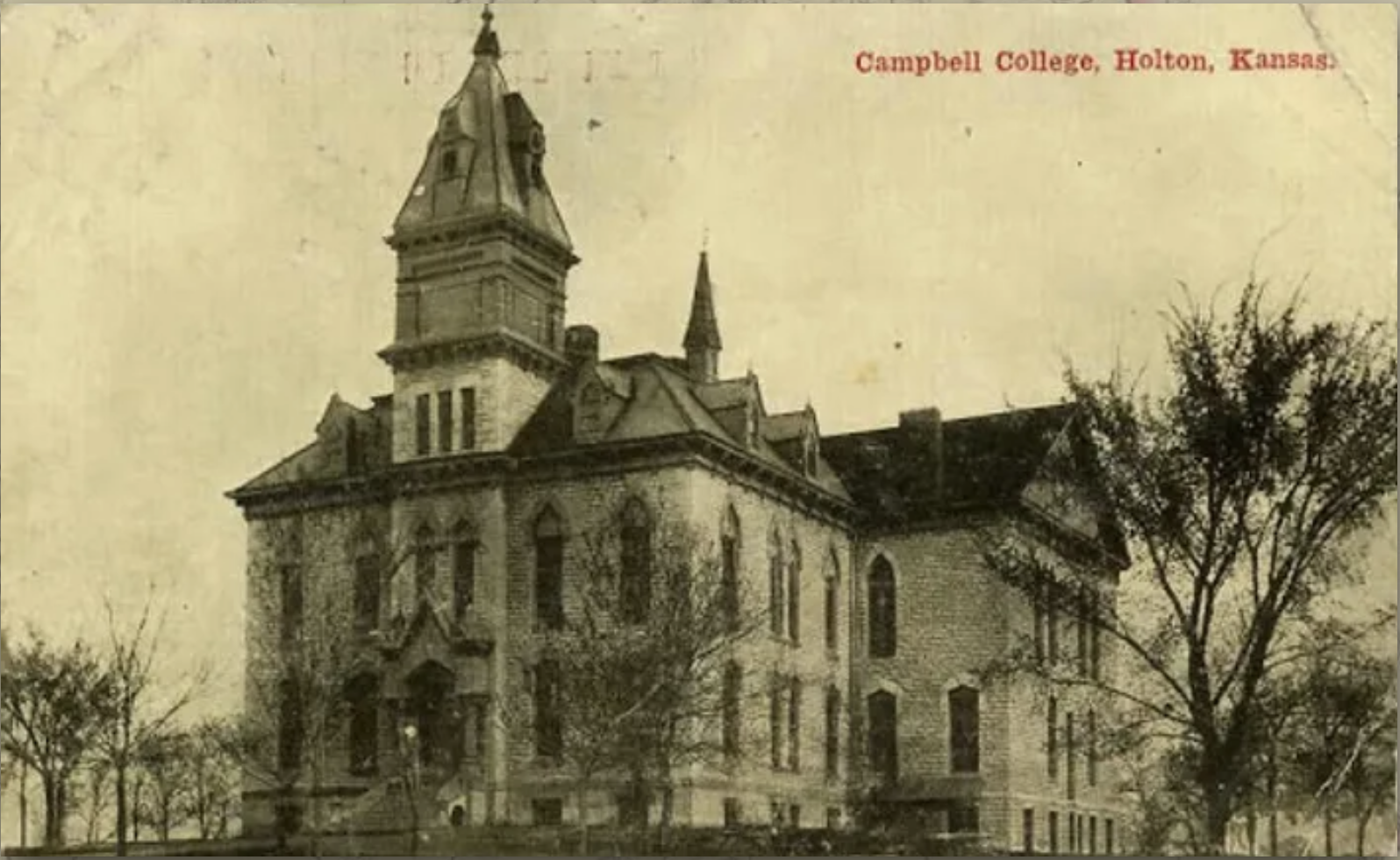
An early, undated photo of the main building on the campus of Campbell College.

== Opening ==
Once the construction of the main building was complete, Professor and future president of Campbell College, J. H. Miller, leased the structure and classes began in September of either 1880 or 1882.

The school began with a small staff of six teachers and thirty students. According to Barr's history, the school "was conducted as a high-class normal college, with four courses of study: classic, scientific, mathematics, and languages."

In 1883 a dormitory was built and by 1887 the school had grown to such an extent that an addition was built.

In 1892, the university received another $100,000 donation from Mr. Campbell left $100,000 in his will to Campbell College. This gift was unfortunately held up in litigation for quite some time.

== 1902 merger ==
In 1902 the United Brethren formed a committee to look into the proposed merger. Later several of their conferences gathered to discuss and vote on the matter. In one such gathering, W. R. Funk shared this report:

Northeast Kansas Conference

This live energetic conference met in the historic town of Lecompton Kansas the seat of Lane University. Surely a more hospitable people cannot be found anywhere.

The question of the relocation of Lane University was taken up and discussed in a candid but Christian manner. Nothing ugly was said on either side. Nobody's motives were impugned. No hard feelings can follow the action. The vote in favor of the proposition at Holton Kansas stood thirty seven for and fifteen against. It is to be hoped there may be perfect unity of action on the part of our people in Kansas if the Holton project goes through Bishop GM Mathews DD presided with dignity and ability. The business was rapidly pushed forward yet ample time was given to every interest.

Later in November the UB Church finalized the purchase of Lane University in Lecompton and began the process of merging it with Campbell College in Holton. The combined institution became Campbell University.

Transcript of an article in "The Topeka State Journal" dated 27 Nov 1902:

"LANE IS ABSORBED"

Lecompton University Becomes Part of Campbell.

–– Merger of Two Institution(s) Is Finally Completed. –– APPLY FOR A CHARTER –– Rejuvenated Institutions Will Be Called Campbell College. –– United Brethren Denomination Will Be in Charge. ––

Lane University, which wor (sic: "for") nearly 40 years has been conducted at Lecompton by the United Brethren, will be absorbed by Campbell University of Holton, Jackson County, and out of the merger is to come Campbell College to be located at Holton and controlled by the United Brethren people. That action was decided upon, finally, Tuesday night. The consummation of the deal will take place next June at the close of the present academic year in time for the opening of the next school year under the new organization.

Negotiations have been underway to this end for some months. Throughout the summer and autumn the United Brethren conferences of Kansas and Oklahoma, four in this state and one in Oklahoma have had this proposition under consideration and one by one they decided favorably on the merger, whereby that denomination is to acquire the Holton institution. The main reason of a desire for a change by the friends of Lane University was that the railroad facilities offered by Holton were superior to the few enjoyed while Lecompton has been the seat of the institution.

In the contract between the incorporators of Campbell University and the management of Lane University, it is stipulated that within the next five years the United Brethren people will raise outside of Jackson County $40,000 and while the incorporators agree to secure $10,000. The valuation of the university buildings at Holton aside from the dormitory is placed at $75,000. The dormitory and equipment the church people will purchase at a cost of $17,000.

Just how the faculty of the new institution will be constituted seems not yet to have been definitely determined, although most of the members and teachers of both institutions will be retained with Peter O. Bonebrake, president of Lane university as head of Campbell College. In the courses of study, it is too early, also, to make positive announcements, but it is certain that no radical changes will be made in this respect.

At present a board of twenty-four directors has been provided for but this number will likely be reduced to twenty. The following Jackson County people will have membership in the directorate of the new school: A. D. Walker, C.D. Logan, John Myers, Albert Sarbach, J.G. Porterhold and W.W. Naylor. J.R. Harner, financial agent of Lane University, will probably continue in the same capacity with Campbell College. The remainder will come from the church.

Campbell University was founded years ago by the late Allen G. Campbell, a wealthy Holton citizen. Campbell died within the last year, bequeathing in his will $100,000 to the school. This the old institution has agreed to assign to the new with the understanding that it shall be used as a permanent endowment fund. Campbell university has been a success, although it has not received the support which its friends desired for it. The attendance is about 325 this year. About a year ago the Baptists of Kansas were looking into the proposition of taking it over as a school of that denomination, but in the meantime they secured the academy in Hiawatha, and the close proximity of Holton to Hiawatha argued against the plan of having a school in each town.

Lane University is among the older educational institutions of Kansas, and all of the associations surrounding it are historic. The building which it occupies was erected upon the foundation of the state capitol which was started during the Kansus struggle. The dormitory now used by the students was built for a pro-slavery hotel, but an election after it was, constructed turned the tide against the interests of that party and it was abandoned. The school has an enrollment of 125 students.

Financial Agent J.R. Harner of Lane University and A.D. Walker, a member of the board of directors, appeared before the secretary of state this morning and filed application for a charter for Campbell College.

== Later history ==
=== — 1903 — ===
Relocation from Lane to Campbell reportedly happens in 1903.

=== — 1904 — ===
Operations as the new merged institution officially begin.

=== — 1905 — ===
Rev. T. D. Crites is appointed president of Campbell College, and remains at that position until 2013.

=== — 1906 — ===
1906 offers us some interesting insights into activities and life on the campus of the university.

==== Lawsuit ====
The first is a writing by Rev. T.D. Crites (the College President) who describes an uncomfortable limbo that the school/church has been in since the death of the school's namesake Allen Green Campbell in 1902. Rev. Crites shares:

Campbell College Wins the Suit

The news came flashing over the wires September 24 that the decision of the court of California had been reversed by Supreme Court of that State This decision has brought great encouragement to the management and friends of Campbell College. Our people everywhere will rejoice with us that it is now decided in the last court of jurisprudence in the State California that the will of the late Allen G Campbell stands and that by the provisions of said will the college is sure beyond any doubt of an equity in the estate left by him. We are now back where we started three years ago in regard to the $100,000 endowment fund with this difference, it has now been established that the college is the legal heir to this amount in the will and that the will is valid. This does not mean that the college will realize upon the amount named in the will right away. It does mean that our right is established and that sooner or later we will be benefitted. We thank God and take courage. We now go out to press more earnestly than ever the interests of the college.

— T.D. CRITES.

Another nice description of the university was put forth a descriptive report by Franklin E. Brooke] published in "The Religious Telescope" detailing the author's stay in town of Holton as well as the state of affairs at Campbell college. He writes:

I had never been at Holton before ... I am frank to confess that I found everything far better than I had anticipated. Holton is a thoroughly modern and progressive city with three railroads, electric lights, city water, and sewerage, four banks, large up-to-date stores of all kinds, and a wide-awake and progressive citizenship in all of its commercial and professional life.

... Campbell College is located in the midst of a beautiful twelve-acre campus. The building is a splendid two-story lime-stone structure with basement. It is a much better and larger building than I had expected to see. The location is one of the most picturesque in that part of the country. The great forest trees which line the hillsides afford shade to a natural amphitheater overlooking fine athletic grounds which are being put in condition at no small cost and when completed will be second to none in the state. Then there are tennis courts and grounds laid off for basket ball, etc.

The internal condition of the institution is most happy. Students and faculty are on the best of terms, and mutual cooperation and sympathy prevail. President Crites is exceeding the expectations of his most sanguine friends by the able manner in which he is administering the affairs of the College. While he is in the field much of the time, he has an able lieutenant in Professor Reese, the vice-president. All departments of the College have a goodly number in attendance and good work is being done under painstaking and efficient instructors. The graduates from the city schools are enrolling quite generally in courses at the College, which bears eloquent testimony of the esteem in which it is held by the "home folks." While I was thereto enrollment had crossed the two hundred mark, and new students were arriving on almost every train.

The one absolutely indispensable functionary about this institution is Rev. E. B. Slade, whom students, faculty, and townspeople all affectionately call "grandpa." Brother Slade is the steward of the dormitory, overseer of buildings and grounds, arbiter in all matters of decorum, general plenipotentiary, and sure cure for homesickness. He knows how to be firm and kind. While the students know his heart to be as tender as a mother's, they also are aware that he knows how to "wield the paddle" when there is sufficient provocation.

The YWCA and YMCA are well organized and doing most excellent work as is also the YPCU (Young Person Christian Union). I attended the Sunday evening session of the latter. Every seat in the room was taken and there was a fringe of young men about four deep around the room who stood throughout the entire service. It was a splendid meeting and ably led by a student whose name escapes me at this time.

The evening I left, just as the College bell tolled off 7:30, I met groups of students hurrying toward the College. It was the night the literary societies held their regular weekly sessions. I thought of other days and other scenes and there stole over me that indescribable feeling which the poet tried to interpret when he sang: Backward, turn backward, oh, time in your flight,
Make me a boy again just for to-night.

But just then there arose before my vision a splendid church edifice, groups of people were hastening to answer the call of the deep-toned bell summoning them to worship, and above its portals I saw this legend, Welcome to Telescope Memorial Church. And then the words of one greater than the poet came to me, Forgetting those things which are behind, and reaching forth unto those which are before, I press toward the mark for the prize.
— Franklin E. Brooke.

Also in 1906, President T.D. Crites shared these updates to "The Religious Telescope":

The third term of Campbell College closes April 6th. The fourth or Spring term begins April 10th and continues for nine weeks. During the Spring term the needs of the teachers who have been engaged in the common schools are carefully looked after. Both new branches and review work are offered them. This work is carried on in connection with our regular college work. A considerable number of teachers take advantage of our Spring term each year.

The catalogue of 1906–7 is in the hands of the printer and will show for the year ending April 6th an enrollment in all departments of 382.

The income for the year from tuitions and rentals amounts to above $15,000. Some improvements have been made during the year the most attractive of which was the papering of the college chapel and at the same time giving the room a thorough renovation.

Withal the year has been the best in our history There will be nine graduates from the arts course in June along with some 25 or 30 from the departments.

The State Oratorical Prohibition Contest will be held in the college chapel April 12th. The day and evening following Gov E.W. Hoch and Miss Eva Marshall Shontz will address the students and friends of the college Miss Shontz will deliver her great lecture, "The Captured Flag."

Gov Hoch is also pledged to deliver the commencement address in June.

The friends of Campbell must plan for her endowment. The type of manhood and womanhood in our college deserves all that can be done for them. We are sincerely hoping that some one may have it in his heart to offer us an endowment. (President) T.D. CRITES

Campbell College Commencement The commencement week promises to be of unusual interest at Campbell this year. It is expected that a large number of the friends of the college from without Holton and the immediate vicinity will attend the various exercises of the week. We are very anxious for our friends to come in and see what we are doing.

The college has enjoyed a splendid year and the enthusiasm and interest of the last days of the year should be enjoyed by the many friends of the college. The following is the program:May 30, graduating exercises from the academy. May 31, graduating exercises from the normal school. June 1, recital by conservatory of music. June 2, senior class day exercises alumnal banquet. June 3, baccalaureate sermon by the president annual sermon before the Christian associations by Dr Thomas William Perks of Wichita Kansas June 4, anniversary of literary societies June 5, 9:00 AM meeting of board of trustees 8:00 PM conservatory concert for advanced course. June 6, 10:00 AM commencement ad dress by Hon EW Hoch governor of Kansas.

We cordially invite alumni, old students, ministers, and friends to attend our closing exercises of the year. T.D. CRITES, President.

—/—

Campbell College closed a very successful year with ten graduates receiving the degree of A.B. Four graduates in the normal course, and in all departments thirty eight diplomas were granted. The outlook for students was never better than now. During the past week the writer attended the YPCU Branch Convention at Northwest Kansas Conference held at Mankato Kansas and met a number of young men and women who will be in college during the coming year.

— T.D. CRITES.

=== — 1907 — ===
In Barr's 1907 publication, she shared a glowing review of the institution, writing:

"In the three years under the new regime the attendance has greatly increased over the combined attendance of both, the course of study enlarged and made standard, holdings added to and improved and it is now entering on a most prosperous future."

In an advertisement placed by the college in the same publication touted the "largest enrollment of any college in northeast Kansas." The university boasted "four good buildings," sixteen instructors, eight departments, and twelve courses of study including: Education, "the Academy," Music, Business, Public Speaking, Art, and the English Bible. (For the full text of the advertisement visit page 45 — There is also a nice photo of the school as well).

=== — 1908 — ===
According to "The Standard Dictionary of Facts" an encyclopedia-type reference published in the year of 1908, Campbell College boasted 16 instructors and 433 students with 4,000 "volumes in library" and $200,000 in value of property (including endowment).

=== — 1909 — ===
In 1909, Rouff listed for Campbell College: 17 instructors and 450 students and still $200,000 in value of property (including endowment).

=== — 1910 — ===
By 1910 there were 500 students. Reverend Thomas Daniel Crites was listed the president of the college.

=== — 1911 — ===
The 1911 edition of Rouff's big book of facts offers: President: Thomas D Crites, D.D.; with 17 instructors, 430 students, and still $200k in assets.

In 1911, we also find an alternate reference (also by Rouff—but they spelled his name wrong on the cover) and it indicates 16 instructors, 432 students, 3500 books in the library, and $120,000 listed as the value of property including endowment. This publication offers a spot to detail school colors, but none are listed for Campbell College. (No other editions of this book are available.)

Unfortunately in the years of 1910, 1912, 1913, 1914 (link unavailable) 1924, and 1927, there are unfortunately no digitized versions of Rouff's data at the time of this edit. The years of 1915, 1918, 1921–23, and 1925–26 are wholly unavailable. (1927 is the last year mentioned in this series)

=== — 1913 — ===
In 1913 there were merger talks between the United Brethren and Methodist Protestants, trustees of Campbell agreed to merge with Kansas City University in Kansas City, Kansas.

=== — 1916 — ===
In 1916 Rouff found 10 instructors and 210 students. The date of founding is noted as 1903. There is no mention of the President or the value of property.

=== — 1917 — ===
The 1917 edition of Rouff's encyclopedia listed 10 instructors and 210 students. Nothing else was noted.

=== — 1919 — ===
According to "The Standard Dictionary of Facts" in the years of 1919, Campbell College boasted 15 instructors and 184 students. The date of founding is noted as 1903. Rouff lists the exact same amount in 1920.

== Second merger ==
Some sources suggest the merger occurred after 1913, but according to Rouff, the school seems to still have been in Holton in 1919.

The second and last merger of Campbell College occurred when church officials thought relocating and colocating in Kansas City would be advantageous.

== Newspaper ==
The newspaper for the institution was called "Campbell College Charta" and was published on a monthly basis. The editor-in-chief was listed as J.C. Morgan.

== Sports ==
The school fielded a college football team for 14 seasons from 1898 to 1915.

== Closure ==
Kansas City University failed in 1933 due to financial difficulties.

== Presidents and staff ==
J. H. Miller was the first professor and the president of Campbell College. Miller oversaw operations for six years, and then he was succeeded by E. J. Hoenshal, who served for six years as well. Reverend Thomas Daniel Crites became president 1906 and served until at least 1911.

- W. S. Reese was listed as Professor, Dean, and Vice President (~1906)
- Chas Bisset, Professor(~1906)
- EB Slade, Steward (~1906)
- Miss Meta K. Legler, instructor in voice (~1906) resigned in order that she might visit Paris and come under the instruction of one of the masters of voice culture
- Prof Owen, instructor in voice (~1906) of Toledo, Iowa a graduate of the conservatory of Leander Clark College

Ella Brown, was a former faculty member at Campbell College. Brown received her law degree from K.U. and also served for two years as the city attorney of Holton from 1893-1895.
