= John T. Caine =

American politician (1829–1911)

John Thomas Caine
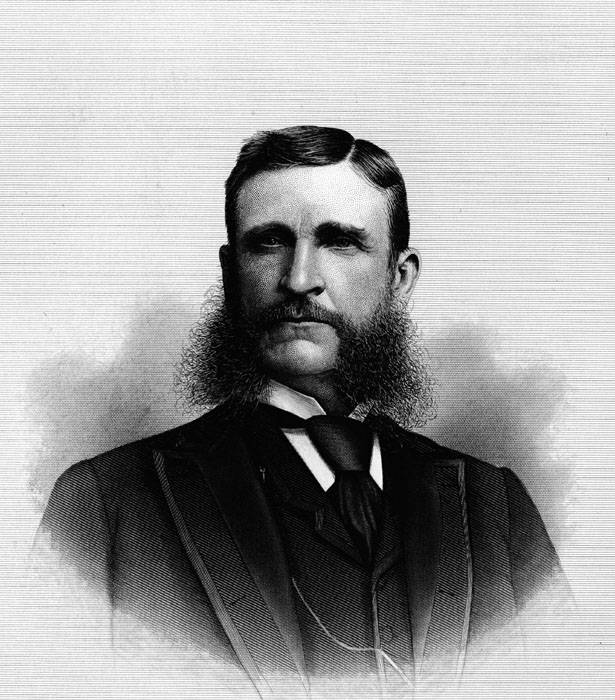

Delegate to the U.S. House of Representatives from Utah Territory's at-large district
- In office November 7, 1882 – March 3, 1893
- Preceded by: George Q. Cannon
- Succeeded by: Joseph L. Rawlins

Member of the Utah Senate from the 6th district
- In office January 11, 1897 – January 8, 1899

Personal details
- Born: January 8, 1829 Patrick, Isle of Man
- Died: September 20, 1911 (aged 82) Salt Lake City, Utah, U.S.
- Resting place: Salt Lake City Cemetery; 40°46′37.92″N 111°51′28.8″W
- Party: Democratic
- Other political affiliations: People's Party
- Occupation: Teacher; Newspaper publisher

John Thomas Caine (January 8, 1829 – September 20, 1911) was a delegate to the United States House of Representatives from the Territory of Utah.

== Biography ==
Born in the parish of Patrick, Isle of Man, Caine attended the common schools in Douglas, Isle of Man.

Caine immigrated to the United States in 1846 and lived in New York City until 1848, when he went to St. Louis. He converted to the Church of Jesus Christ of Latter-day Saints (LDS Church) in New York City in March 1847. On the 22nd of October, he married Margaret Nightingale.

Caine settled in the Territory of Utah in 1852 and taught school. He served as secretary of the territorial council during the sessions of 1856, 1857, 1859, and 1860. He was one of the founders of the Salt Lake Herald in 1870, serving as managing editor and president. He served as delegate to the Utah constitutional conventions in 1872 and 1882. He served as member of the territorial council in 1874, 1876, 1880, and 1882.

Caine served as City Recorder of Salt Lake City in 1876, 1878, 1880, and 1882.

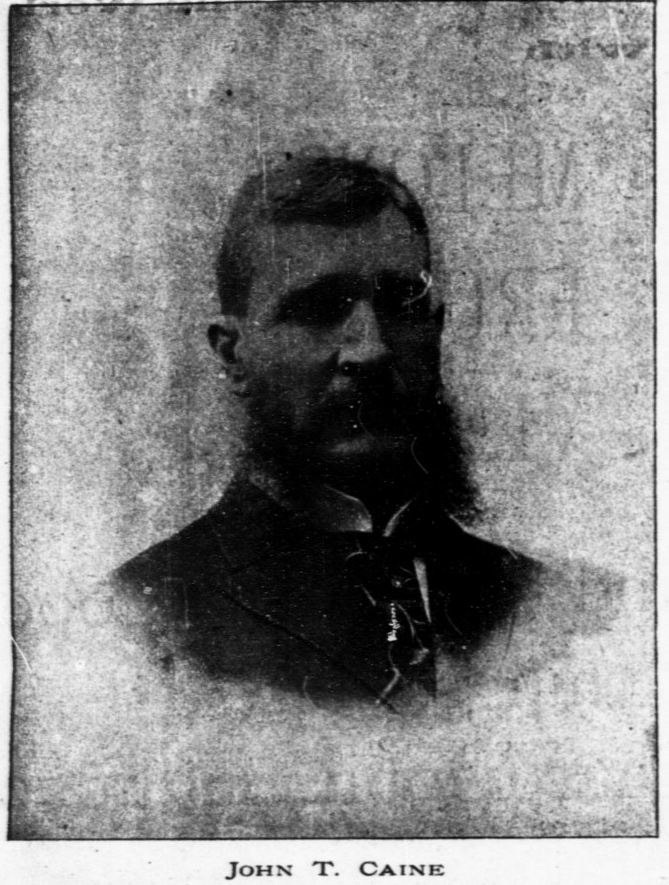
John T. Caine, September 14, 1895 in The Broad Ax newspaper

Caine was elected as a Democrat to the Forty-seventh Congress to fill the vacancy caused by the action of the House declaring the Delegate-elect ineligible. The election had been won by George Quayle Cannon (18,567 votes), but the other contestant Allen G. Campbell (1357 votes) successfully contested the outcome. The House of Representatives refused to seat either man, and instead allowed Caine to fill the position in the 47th Congress. He was reelected as a Democrat to the Forty-eighth, Forty-ninth and Fiftieth Congresses and on the People's Party ticket to the Fifty-first and Fifty-second Congresses and served from November 7, 1882, to March 3, 1893. He was not a candidate for renomination in 1892.

When LDS prophet and president Wilford Woodruff announced in his Manifesto of September, 1890 that the Church would not sanction any additional polygamist marriages, it was Caine who disseminated the information to members of Congress and the media in the Eastern US.

Caine was an unsuccessful Democratic candidate for the position of first governor of the newly formed State of Utah in 1895 (the Act of Statehood took effect on January 2, 1896).

Caine was elected as a member of the Utah State Senate in 1896. After serving one term, he resumed the management of the Salt Lake Herald.

Caine died of cystitis in Salt Lake City, Utah. He was interred in the Salt Lake City Cemetery.

Caine is the namesake of Caineville, Utah.

== See also ==
- United States congressional delegates from Utah Territory

== Notes ==
Party political offices
First	Democratic nominee for Governor of Utah; 1895	Succeeded by James Moyle
U.S. House of Representatives
Preceded by George Q. Cannon	Delegate to the U.S. House of Representatives from Utah Territory; 1882–1893	Succeeded by Joseph L. Rawlins
