= Utah Territory's at-large congressional district =

Obsolete congressional district

- Obsolete district
- Created: 1850, as a non-voting delegate was granted by Congress
- Eliminated: 1896, as a result of statehood
- Years active: 1850–1896

Utah Territory's at-large congressional district is an obsolete congressional district that encompassed the area of the Utah Territory. After Utah's admission to the Union as the 45th state by act of Congress on January 4, 1896, this district was dissolved and replaced by Utah's at-large congressional district.

== List of delegates representing the district ==
On September 9, 1850, an act of Congress gave Utah Territory the authority to elect a congressional delegate, though the first delegate did not take his seat until 1851. The territorial delegates were elected to two-year terms. Delegates were allowed to serve on committees, debate, and submit legislation, but were not permitted to vote on bills.

Delegate	Party	Years	Cong ress	Electoral history
John M. Bernhisel (Salt Lake City)	Independent	March 4, 1851 – March 3, 1859	32nd 33rd 34th 35th	Elected in 1850. Re-elected in 1852. Re-elected in 1854. Re-elected in 1856. Lost re-election.
William H. Hooper (Salt Lake City)	Democratic	March 4, 1859 – March 3, 1861	36th	Elected in 1858. Lost re-election.
John M. Bernhisel (Salt Lake City)	Independent	March 4, 1861 – March 3, 1863	37th	Elected in 1860. Retired.
John F. Kinney (Salt Lake City)	Democratic	March 4, 1863 – March 3, 1865	38th	Elected in 1862. Retired.
William H. Hooper (Salt Lake City)	Democratic	March 4, 1865 – March 3, 1873	39th 40th 41st 42nd	Elected in 1864. Re-elected in 1866. Re-elected in 1868. Re-elected in 1870. Retired.
George Q. Cannon (Salt Lake City)	Republican	March 4, 1873 – March 3, 1881	43rd 44th 45th 46th	Elected in 1872. Re-elected in 1874. Re-elected in 1876. Re-elected in 1878. In 1881, George Q. Cannon won re-election, but the governor appointed Allen G. Campbell. Cannon successfully contested the election, but the House decided on April 20, 1882 not to seat Cannon on grounds that Cannon was a polygamist.
Vacant		March 4, 1881 – November 7, 1882	47th	
John T. Caine (Salt Lake City)	Democratic	November 7, 1882 – March 3, 1889	47th 48th 49th 50th 51st 52nd	Elected to finish the vacant term. Re-elected in 1884. Re-elected in 1886. Re-elected in 1888 as a Populist. Re-elected in 1890. Retired.
John T. Caine (Salt Lake City)	Populist	March 4, 1889 – March 3, 1893	47th 48th 49th 50th 51st 52nd	Elected to finish the vacant term. Re-elected in 1884. Re-elected in 1886. Re-elected in 1888 as a Populist. Re-elected in 1890. Retired.
Joseph L. Rawlins (Salt Lake City)	Democratic	March 4, 1893 – March 3, 1895	53rd	Elected in 1892. Lost re-election.
Frank J. Cannon (Ogden)	Republican	March 4, 1895 – January 4, 1896	54th	Elected in 1894. Position eliminated on statehood and retired to run for U.S. senator.
