= Allen G. Campbell =

American mining investor (1834–1902)

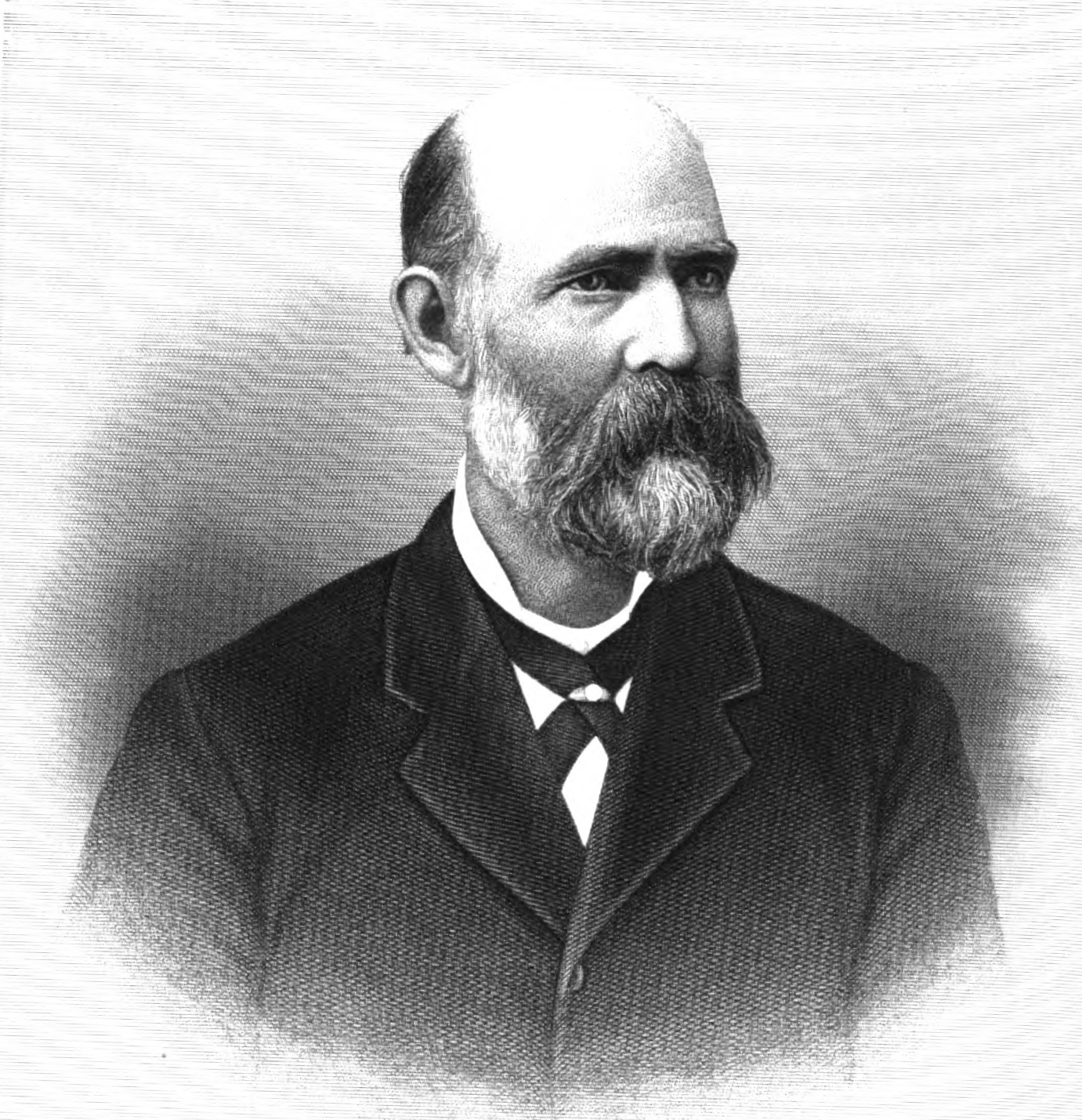

Delegate-elect to the U.S. House of Representatives from Utah Territory's at-large district
- In office March 4, 1881 – April 20, 1882
- Preceded by: George Q. Cannon
- Succeeded by: John T. Caine

Personal details
- Born: October 16, 1834 Pulaski County, Missouri
- Died: June 17, 1902 (aged 67) Riverside, California
- Party: Democratic
- Spouses: Florence Oursler (m. 1868; div. 1877); Eleanor Crouch Young (m. 1893)

Allen Green Campbell, sometimes known as Green Campbell, (October 16, 1834 – June 17, 1902) was an American miner, mining investor, politician, and philanthropist.

== Mining career ==
Campbell was born on October 16, 1834, in Pulaski County, Missouri, the son of the county sheriff. He moved to Kansas in the early 1850s, and from there to the Pikes Peak region of Colorado in 1859. Campbell went on the mine successfully in Montana for several years, returning to Kansas with over $50,000. After several failed mining investments in Utah, he purchased the Horn Silver Mine at Frisco with Matthew Cullen and several other investors for $25,000. After several years, it was sold to the company of Charles G. Francklyn for a sum of $5,000,000.

== Political career ==
He was a member of the Anti-Mormon Utah Liberal Party. He ran for several territorial offices before he was involved in an election controversy in 1880. Campbell lost the election for territorial delegate to George Q. Cannon, receiving just over 1000 of the nearly 19000 votes cast. However, Utah territorial governor Eli H. Murray, a Liberal Party member, overturned the election results, stating that Cannon was not a naturalized American citizen (he was born in Liverpool, England), and therefore ineligible to take office. Anti-Mormon feelings toward Cannon, a member of the LDS Church, were suspected of being the true motive behind the nullification of the election. Campbell was certified as the winner and temporarily seated in Congress. However, a House elections committee dismissed the election results, denying the claims of both candidates, and a new election was held, where John T. Caine was elected.

== Later career and philanthropy ==
When residents of Holton, Kansas, where Campbell had previously resided, sent a letter to him inquiring if he was interested in funding an institution of higher learning, he replied that he would provide half of the funds for such an institution provided that it be non-sectarian and that "there must be no partiality shown on account of race or color." After the school was built, Campbell continued to fund improvements. Campbell Normal University, later Campbell College, bore his name from 1880 till its closing in 1933.

With the funds from the sale of Silver Horn Mine, Campbell invested in mines in Utah, Nevada, and southern California. He died in Riverside, California, on June 17, 1902, with an estate worth more than $1,000,000, of which he left $100,000 to Campbell College.
