= Joseph L. Rawlins =

United States senator from Utah

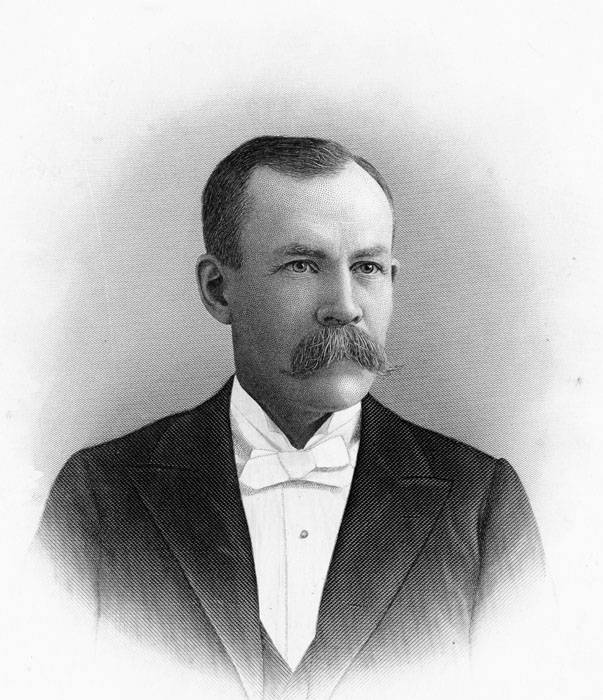
- Portrait c. 1880–1890

United States Senator from Utah
- In office March 4, 1897 – March 3, 1903
- Preceded by: Arthur Brown
- Succeeded by: Reed Smoot

Delegate to the U.S. House of Representatives from Utah Territory's at-large district
- In office March 4, 1893 – March 3, 1895
- Preceded by: John T. Caine
- Succeeded by: Frank J. Cannon

Personal details
- Born: March 28, 1850 Millcreek, Provisional State of Deseret, U.S. (now Utah, U.S.)
- Died: May 24, 1926 (aged 76) Salt Lake City, Utah, U.S.
- Resting place: Salt Lake City Cemetery; 40°46′37.92″N 111°51′28.8″W
- Party: Democratic
- Spouse: Julia Elizabeth Davis
- Children: 7, including Brent, Leda, Athol, Alta, Josephine, Lara, Boyce
- Parents: Joseph Sharp Rawlins; Mary Frost
- Education: University of Deseret (Utah); Indiana University Bloomington
- Occupation: Politician, lawyer
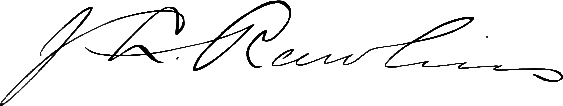
- Signature

Joseph Lafayette Rawlins (March 28, 1850 – May 24, 1926) was a delegate to the U.S. Congress from Utah Territory and a senator from Utah after statehood was achieved.

== Biography ==
Rawlins was the youngest of three children born to Joseph Sharp Rawlins and Mary Frost. He was born in the Provisional State of Deseret near present-day Millcreek, Utah, about fifteen miles southeast of Salt Lake City, Utah. In 1852, the Latter-day Saint prophet Brigham Young directed Rawlins's father to settle in Draper, Utah to farm. As prophet, Young had significant influence over the affairs of early Latter-day Saint settlers. Rawlins's father was often absent serving various missions at Young's request. He was first called in 1855 to the Elk Mountain Mission when Rawlins was four, leaving his mother, sisters, and himself to tend the farm. His father's frequent absences at Brigham Young's request deeply challenged Rawlins's faith and started his disaffection from the church.

The young Rawlins enjoyed learning and developed an interest in mathematics. However, his duties on the farm took precedence over schooling, especially when his father was away. Between the ages of fourteen and eighteen, his education did not exceed sixteen months.

Rawlins began his university studies at the University of Deseret, but could not continue after his first year due to lack of finances. Later, he pursued a classical course at Indiana University Bloomington. He was a professor at the University of Deseret in Salt Lake City from 1873 to 1875. He then studied law; he was admitted to the bar in 1875, and he commenced practice in Salt Lake City. Raised in the Church of Jesus Christ of Latter-day Saints (LDS Church), young Rawlins disliked the practice of plural marriage and was grateful that his father, Joseph Sharp Rawlins, resisted the pressure of the church to take a second wife. However, when the elder Rawlins did succumb to the wishes of the authorities, his son began questioning the principles and practices of the Latter-day Saints. By the time Rawlins returned to Utah after his first year at college, he was well on the way toward apostasy in his views, and by the time he became Salt Lake's city attorney, he considered himself no longer a member of the LDS Church. He never returned to the church.

Rawlins was elected as a Democrat as Utah Territory's delegate to the Fifty-third Congress (March 4, 1893 – March 3, 1895). He was an unsuccessful candidate for reelection in 1894 to the Fifty-fourth Congress. After Utah achieved statehood in 1896, Rawlins was elected by the Utah State Legislature as a Democrat to the United States Senate and served from March 4, 1897, to March 3, 1903. He was an unsuccessful candidate for re-election.

Afterwards, Rawlins continued the practice of law in Utah in partnership with Edgar A. Wedgwood and Samuel R. Thurman. In 1921, he withdrew from public life and active business, and he died in Salt Lake City. He is buried in Salt Lake City Cemetery.

== See also ==
- United States Congress Delegates from Utah Territory

== Citations ==
U.S. House of Representatives
Preceded by John T. Caine	Delegate to the U.S. House of Representatives from Utah Territory; 1893–1895	Succeeded by Frank J. Cannon
U.S. Senate
Preceded by Arthur Brown	U.S. senator (Class 1) from Utah; 1897–1903; Served alongside: Frank J. Cannon, Thomas Kearns	Succeeded by Reed Smoot
