= Frank J. Cannon =

United States Senator from Utah

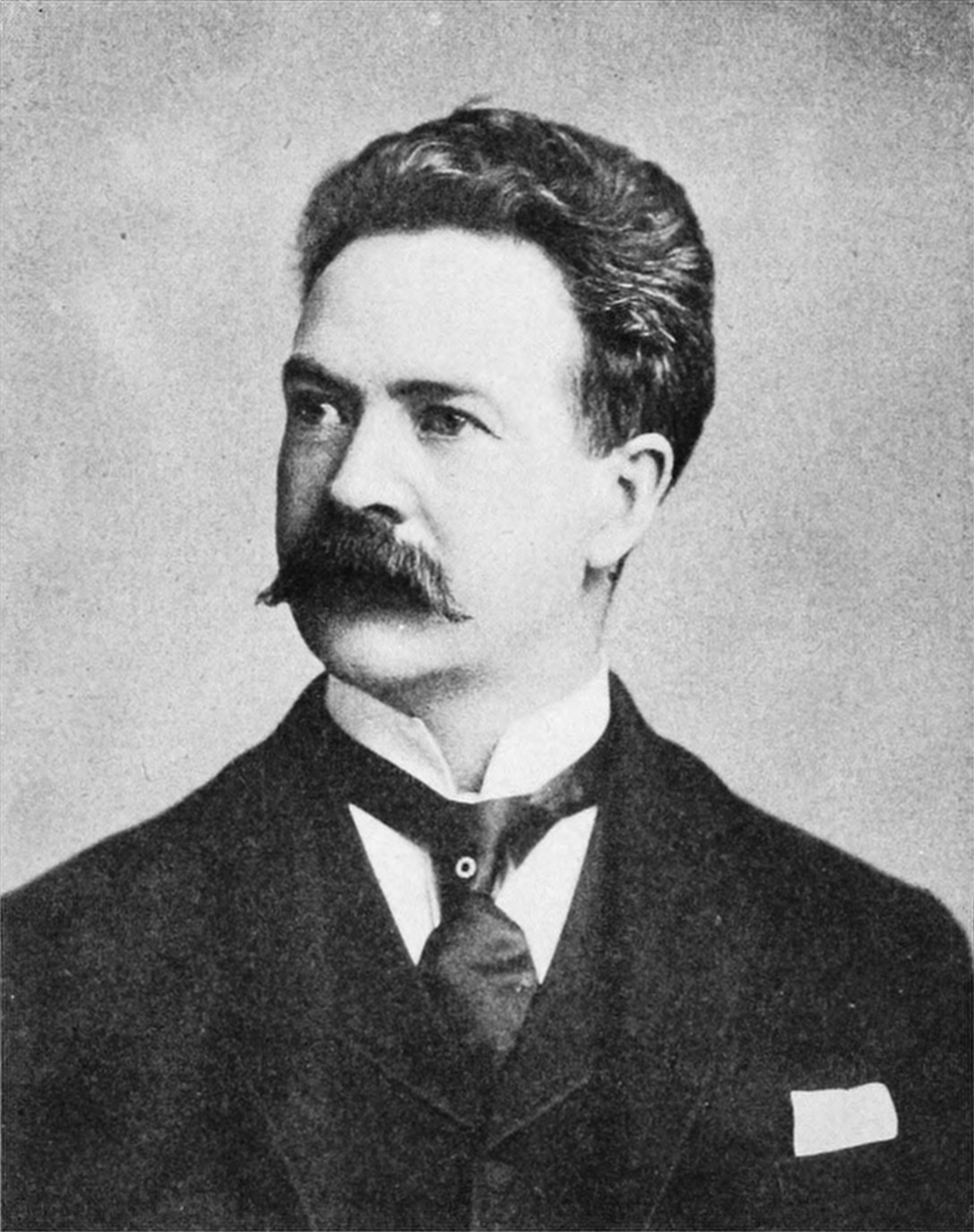
- Cannon in 1899

United States Senator from Utah
- In office January 22, 1896 – March 3, 1899
- Preceded by: Seat established
- Succeeded by: Thomas Kearns

Delegate to the U.S. House of Representatives from Utah Territory's at-large district
- In office March 4, 1895 – January 4, 1896
- Preceded by: Joseph L. Rawlins
- Succeeded by: Clarence Emir Allen (Representative)

Personal details
- Born: Frank Jenne Cannon; January 25, 1859 Great Salt Lake City, Utah Territory, U.S.
- Died: July 25, 1933 (aged 74) Denver, Colorado, U.S.
- Party: Silver Republican; Republican (previously)
- Spouse(s): Martha Brown (d. 1909) May Brown (m. 1909)
- Children: 3
- Education: University of Deseret

Frank Jenne Cannon (January 25, 1859 – July 25, 1933) was the first United States senator from Utah, who served from 1896 to 1899.

== Early life ==
Born in Salt Lake City, Cannon was the eldest child of Sarah Jenne Cannon and George Q. Cannon. His father was an apostle in the Church of Jesus Christ of Latter-day Saints (LDS Church) and later was a member of its First Presidency. After attending the school in Salt Lake City, Frank Cannon studied at University of Deseret, graduating at the age of 19. He married Martha Brown of Ogden in 1878.

== Political career ==
In the string of events preceding the announcement of Wilford Woodruff in September, 1890 that The Church of Jesus Christ of Latter-day Saints would not sanction additional polygamist marriages, Cannon played a role in shuttling communications between the US Congress and Church leadership.

In 1891 he helped to organize the Utah Republican Party. After a failed bid to become delegate from the Utah Territory, he succeeded and served from March 4, 1895, to January 4, 1896. Cannon was chosen in 1896 to serve as senator by the Utah Legislature in spite of LDS church leadership favoring his father for the job. He served in the United States Senate, initially, as a member of the Republican Party; however, he later became a member of the Silver Republican Party, founded by his successor (and future employer at The Salt Lake Tribune) Thomas Kearns.

Cannon lost re-election in 1899. Utah's state legislators indicated they would not support Cannon for re-election shortly after the November 1898 elections. Cannon had voted against the Dingley Act, which would have raised tariffs on sugar and helped the Utah sugar industry. It was strongly supported by the LDS Church hierarchy, who now opposed his re-election. Other factors were his support for Free Silver, rumors about immoral acts he may have committed while living in Washington, DC, and the fact that the Utah legislature was controlled by Democrats. Alfred W. McCune, one of Salt Lake City's most prominent businessmen, sought and won the backing of the LDS Church in his bid for the seat. But the legislature quickly deadlocked over the election. One-hundred and twenty-one ballots were cast, and no winner emerged. On February 18, a state representative accused McCune of trying to buy his vote. A seven-member legislative voted 7-to-2 to absolve McCune of the charge, and although ballotting resumed on March 8 McCune still lacked enough votes to win office (he had only 25 votes). The legislature adjourned without having chosen a senator,

Utah's U.S. Senate seat remained vacant until January 1901. The Republicans regained their majority in the state legislature in the election of 1900 and elected a wealthy mine owner Thomas Kearns to fill the seat. The election was still hotly disputed. Kearns received only 8 votes on the first ballot, and balloting continued for four more days. On January 22, Kearns won the election by a vote of 37-to-25 (with a unanimous block of Republican votes).

Cannon affiliated with the Democratic Party in 1900 and served as its state chairman 1902–1904.

== Later life ==
After failing to be re-elected to the U.S. Senate by the Utah legislature, in part due to opposition by the Mormon hierarchy, Cannon worked as the editor of several newspapers, including The Salt Lake Tribune, the Ogden Herald (Ogden, Utah) and established the Ogden Standard in 1888. Between 1904 and 1911, Cannon consistently supported the anti-Mormon American Party in newspaper editorials.

Cannon later rejected Mormonism and wrote a book, with Harvey J. O'Higgins, called Under the Prophet in Utah exposing the rigidly hierarchical nature of the Mormon organization. The book denounced what the authors described as the "church" leadership's "absolutism" and "interference" in politics: "[Mormons] live under an absolutism. They have no more right of judgment than a dead body. Yet the diffusion of authority is so clever that nearly every man seems to share in its operation... and feels himself in some degree a master without observing that he is also a slave". The book details the negotiations Cannon participated in on Utah's behalf leading to statehood in exchange for official rejection of polygamy and LDS leadership's domination of civil politics during the 1890s, and the subsequent back-sliding he observed in the years following statehood.

During the last two decades of his life, he lectured against Mormonism and in support of "free silver" policies (as opposed to the Gold Standard). He died, at the age of 74, in Denver, in 1933.

== See also ==
- List of United States senators who switched parties
- United States congressional delegates from Utah Territory

U.S. House of Representatives
Preceded by Joseph L. Rawlins	Delegate to the U.S. House of Representatives from Utah Territory; 1895–1896	Succeeded by statehood achieved
U.S. Senate
Preceded by None	U.S. senator (Class 1) from Utah; 1896–1899; Served alongside: Arthur Brown, Joseph L. Rawlins	Succeeded by Thomas Kearns
