= Arthur Brown (American politician) =

American politician (1843–1906)

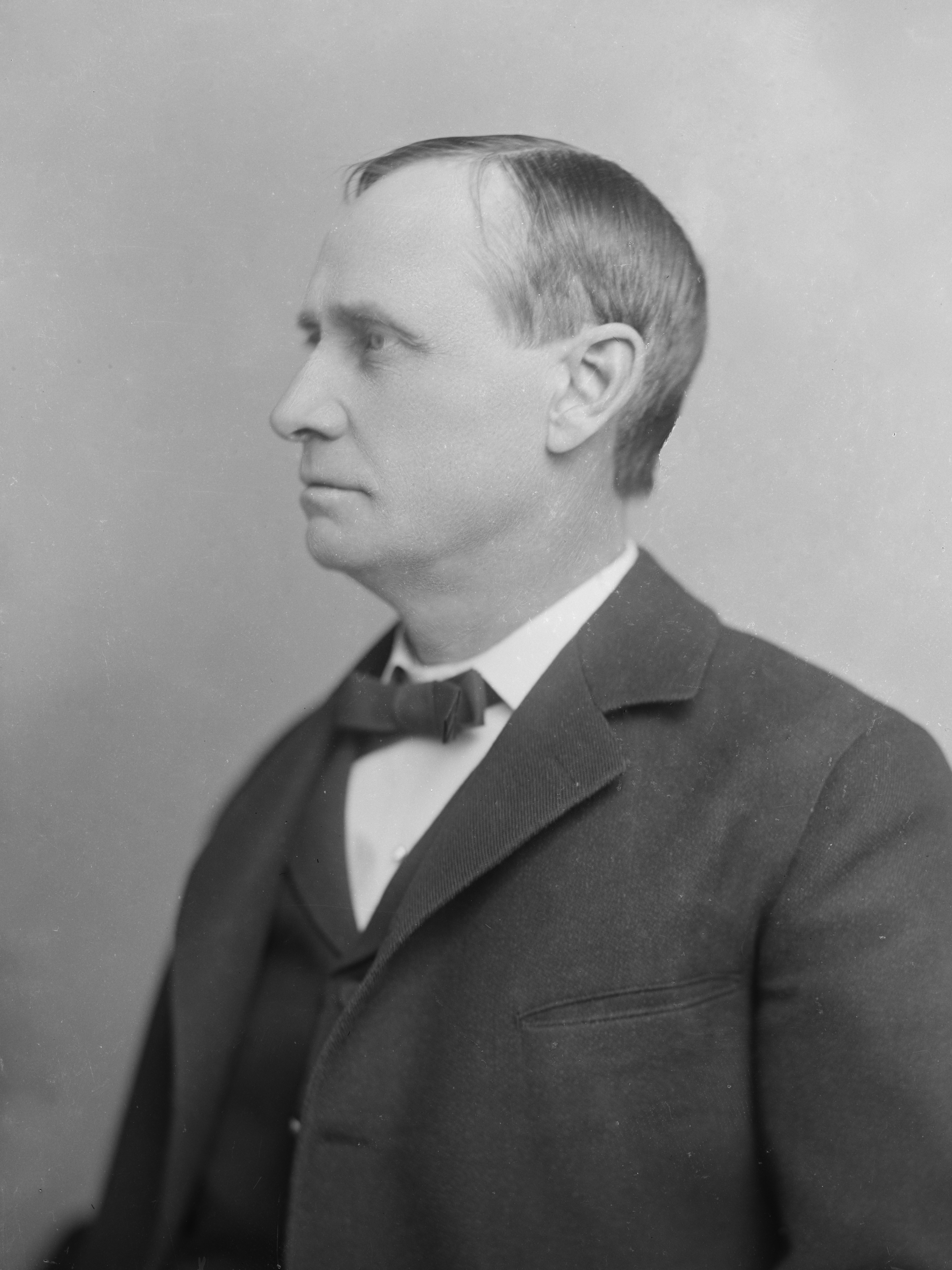

United States Senator from Utah
- In office January 22, 1896 – March 3, 1897
- Preceded by: None
- Succeeded by: Joseph L. Rawlins

Personal details
- Born: March 8, 1843 Prairie Ronde, Kalamazoo County, Michigan, U.S.
- Died: December 12, 1906 (aged 63) Washington, D.C., U.S.
- Party: Republican
- Education: Antioch College; University of Michigan Law School

Arthur Brown (March 8, 1843 – December 12, 1906) was a United States Senator from Utah.

== Early life ==
Arthur Brown was born March 8, 1843, on a farm in Prairie Ronde, Kalamazoo County, Michigan. When he was thirteen the family moved to Yellow Springs, Ohio, where he attended Antioch College, from which he graduated with a BA degree in 1862. He pursued graduate work at the University of Michigan while also attending the University of Michigan Law School, and he received a MA in 1863 and an LLB in 1864. Brown practiced law in Kalamazoo, and also became active in politics as a Republican.

== Career ==
In 1879, he moved to Salt Lake City, Utah Territory, in hopes of being appointed U.S. district attorney for the territory. Failing to do so, he instead set up a private law practice.

Nearing forty and a successful attorney, Brown joined the Republican Party and rose through its ranks. In 1896 the predominantly Republican Legislature elected him and Frank J. Cannon as Utah's first U.S. senators, an office sought by many prominent men as it was the great political prize of statehood. Brown drew the short term, serving in the Senate from January 22, 1896, until March 3, 1897. He was not a candidate for renomination and resumed the practice of law in Salt Lake City.

Brown was also the second cousin of future President Calvin Coolidge and a member of the Phillips Congregational Church, in Salt Lake City.

== Wives, mistresses, and death ==
Brown was first married to Lydia Coon, with whom he had a daughter, Alice. Brown later married Isabel Cameron after separating from Lydia and with her had one son, Max.

Brown then met Anne Maddison Bradley and the two became lovers. Isabel hired a detective and charged Brown and they were jailed more than once for adultery.

On February 4, 1903, Brown was found guilty of contempt of court in failing to comply with the Salt Lake City court's order to pay Mrs. Brown temporary alimony of $150 month.

On December 8, 1906, Brown was shot in Washington, D.C., by his longtime mistress, Bradley, who claimed to be the mother of his children.

Bradley found love letters to Brown from Asenath Ann "Annie" Adams Kiskadden (an actress who was the mother of actress Maude Adams). Bradley assumed Brown was having a second affair with Kiskadden and confronted him at The Raleigh Hotel on 12th Street near Pennsylvania Avenue. That night (December 8, 1906), Bradley shot Brown. Brown died from his wounds four days later, at age 63, and was interred in Mount Olivet Cemetery, Salt Lake City.

At trial, it was revealed that Brown's will renounced Bradley and the two sons she claimed he sired, and a sympathetic jury acquitted her due to temporary insanity.

Brown's murder was featured in an episode of Deadly Women, entitled "Ruthless Revenge".

U.S. Senate
Preceded by None	U.S. senator (Class 3) from Utah; 1896–1897; Served alongside: Frank J. Cannon	Succeeded by Joseph L. Rawlins
