= Runaway Officials of 1851 =

Political appointies in Utah Territory who fled the region in 1851

The "Runaway Officials of 1851" were a group of three federal officers, Judge Perry E. Brocchus, Judge Lemuel G. Brandebury, and Territorial Secretary Broughton Harris, who were appointed to Utah Territory by President Millard Fillmore in 1851. These men arrived in Utah in the summer of that year, and though they were cordially welcomed, they soon came into conflict with the Church of Jesus Christ of Latter-day Saints (LDS Church) and Latter-day Saint settlers of the territory. The confrontation centered around several features of the Mormon pioneer community, most significantly their practice of polygamy, which the appointees publicly denigrated. Eventually disagreements over territorial administration became rampant between the non-Mormon federal officials and newly appointed territorial Governor and President of the LDS Church, Brigham Young. By the end of September 1851, each of these officers left his Utah appointment for the east and their posts remained unfilled for the next two years. This was the first in a series of disagreements between the Latter-day Saint residents of Utah Territory and the United States government which would finally result in the Utah War of 1857–1858.

== Background ==
Members of LDS Church, sometimes called Mormon pioneers, settled in what is now Utah in July 1847. The Latter-day Saints had purposefully left the United States and come to what was then a part of Mexico due to the severe persecution which they had endured in several eastern states since their religion was founded in 1830. They hoped that in the empty deserts of the Great Basin they could worship as they pleased and create a utopian community called Zion without outside interference. However, most of the American Southwest was transferred to the United States following the American victory in the Mexican–American War. In addition, discharged Latter-day Saint soldiers who had served in the Mormon Battalion during the Mexican War helped discover gold at Sutter's Mill in California in 1848. The resultant California Gold Rush brought thousands of emigrants across the country and curtailed the Mormons' short-lived isolation.

As a result, in 1849 the Latter-day Saints petitioned Congress that a huge swath of land which they had settled be admitted into the Union as the State of Deseret. Their proposed state stretched from central Colorado to southern California, and from the middle of Idaho to southern Arizona. The Latter-day Saints hoped for statehood so that they would have the ability to elect their own leaders, and hopefully avoid the persecution which they had so recently escaped. Because of their previous experiences, the Latter-day Saints were convinced that self-governance was the only safeguard to their religious freedom, and they worried about the possible introduction of "unsympathetic carpetbag appointees" if Deseret were relegated to territorial status. However, Congress instead incorporated "Deseret" into the significantly reduced but still large Utah Territory as part of the Compromise of 1850. John M. Bernhisel, a Latter-day Saint representative in Washington, D.C., strenuously lobbied President Fillmore for an all-Latter-day Saint slate of territorial officials. He urged the president that "the people of Utah cannot but consider it their right, as American citizens to be governed by men of their own choice, entitled to their confidence, and united with them in opinion and feeling." The president therefore appointed Brigham Young, President and Prophet of the LDS Church, as the territory's governor, and assigned prominent positions to several other Latter-days Saints. But, Fillmore also gave a number of territorial appointments to non-Latter-day Saints, or "Gentiles" in Mormon parlance.

== Arrival of officials ==
Fillmore's territorial officials began to arrive in Utah in the summer of 1851, and they were warmly welcomed by the Latter-day Saints regardless of their religious affiliation. For instance, Judge Brandebury, who was non-Mormon, was the first to arrive and was honored by a banquet and several dances. Territorial Secretary Harris and his wife, both "Gentiles," traveled to Utah with Bernhisel, and upon arriving on July 19 were greeted by a group of Mormons with a basket of fruit and champagne. Historian Norman Furniss states that

this enthusiastic reception was not a hypocritical pose, for Young and his colleagues were prepared to think well of their first Gentile officials. But for all that, the concord was soon broken.

Donald Moorman writes that the arrival of non-Mormon federal officials in Utah followed a predictable pattern, beginning with "an introductory phase of amicable relations with the Church that quickly degenerated into a period of acrimonious dispute."

== Relations sour ==
The relationship between the "Gentile" officials and the Latter-day Saints quickly broke down despite the initial good will. For instance, Secretary Harris had been entrusted with $24,000 in gold and the territorial seal to deliver to Governor Young. However, he refused to turn these funds or the seal over to Young when he discovered that the 1850 territorial census had been taken without his certification, despite the fact that he had not yet arrived in the territory. This condition was worsened by a public address from non-Mormon Judge Brocchus in September. July 24, or Pioneer Day as it is known in Utah, is the anniversary of the Mormons' arrival in the Salt Lake Valley in 1847. At Pioneer Day festivities in 1851, the Latter-day Saints' celebrations included, (as they often did) orations which rehashed their years of persecution in Missouri and Illinois, and condemned the US government and President Zachary Taylor in particular for their ill treatment.

Several months later, Judge Brocchus was given an opportunity to address the crowd at the General Conference of the LDS Church. Brocchus has been described as a man "at times disarmingly charming, at other times biterly sardonic...His face was marked by frequent brawls, for he often engaged his opponents with a quick resort to his fists." Having heard of the accusations against the government on Pioneer Day, he took on this later visage and loudly reprimanded the Latter-day Saints for their lack of patriotism and morality, making an unmistakable inference to the Mormon practice of polygamy. Brocchus proceeded to lecture the women in the audience on the importance of virtue. The Latter-day Saint crowd now in an uproar, Brigham Young calmed the audience but issued a blistering diatribe against Brocchus in which he stated that he could have "loosed the congregation upon Brocchus with a gesture of his little finger, but he satisfied himself with a tongue-lashing." Brocchus' aversion to polygamy and other Mormon practices, was shared among the non-Mormon officials. Furniss states that Secretary Harris and his wife in particular "were prepared to treat the Mormons as they would a tribe of Arapahoe Indians - not as animals, exactly, but certainly not as civilized people." The condescension with which the federal appointees and their families treated the Mormons created a further source of tension between them.

== Runaways ==
Brigham Young tried to repair the breach between the community and the non-Mormon officials through a series of letters in late September. However, by this point the damage had been done. Harris, Brandebury, and Brocchus concluded that they could not fulfill their assignments in Utah, and they feared for their physical safety. The three men therefore left Utah for the east on September 28, 1851, less than three months after they had arrived in the Territory. The "Runaways" maintained possession of the $24,000 earmarked for the Territory and the territorial seal despite a lawsuit by Young to obtain them in the days before the officers left.

The day after the disgruntled officials departed Salt Lake City, Young wrote a strongly worded letter to President Fillmore defending the Latter-day Saints' patriotism, attacking the character of Brocchus and the others, and suggesting that territorial residents be appointed to federal office. When the officials arrived in Washington without incident, they wrote a report of conditions in Utah which "left unclear whether the people habitually kicked their dogs; otherwise their calendar of infamy in Utah was complete." Norman Furniss writes,

It is of no value to weigh the truthfulness of Brigham Young's assertions and the Runaways' counterattack. The Church, whether understandably or not, was in a mood incompatible with submissive acceptance of territorial status. For their part, Brocchus and the others had shown a remarkable indifference to the feelings of their temporary constituents, had without due cause deserted their offices, and had explained their behavior with statements of at best partial accuracy.

However, the accusations of the Runaways created a firestorm for the Fillmore Administration and in Congress. Bernhisel and Thomas L. Kane of Philadelphia lobbied for the Latter-day Saints in Washington. However, rumors flew about the capital that Brigham Young would be replaced as governor, or even that federal troops would be dispatched to Utah. But, by June 1852, the controversy had subsided. Congress passed a statute depriving any territorial officials of pay if they were absent from their assignments without due cause, and Daniel Webster advised Brocchus to either resign his position or return to the territory.

== Results ==
The "Runaways" never returned to Utah Territory and their positions remained unfilled until 1853. The Utah Legislature conferred original jurisdiction in both criminal and civil cases to the territory's probate courts in 1852; therefore giving local Mormon-controlled courts concurrent jurisdiction with the federal district courts. While this may have allowed for efficiency in justice given the lack of a full complement of federal judges, the move was denounced as a power grab by federal officials.

Both Brocchus and Brandebury were eventually replaced by non-Mormon officials who were generally friendly to the Latter-day Saints, briefly bringing a measure of peace between the Mormons of Utah and the federal government until both men died in 1855. Both replacements, Judge John F. Kinney and Judge W. W. Drummond, exhibited open hostility to the Latter-day Saints. The disputes between these officials and the Mormon hierarchy contributed greatly to the outbreak of the Utah War two years later.

== See also ==
- John W. Dawson - Governor of Utah Territory in 1861 who left the territory and his post as governor after only three weeks
