= Benthin =

Benthin is a surname. Notable people with the surname include:

- Gustave Benthin (born 1991), American football player
- Johan Benthin (1936–2006), Danish artist
- Manuel Benthin (born 1979), German footballer

== See also ==
- The Benthin Family, East German 1950 film
