= Gustave Benthin =

American football player (born 1991)

No. 92
- Position: Nose guard

Personal information
- Born: February 10, 1991 (age 35); Knappa, Oregon, U.S.
- Listed height: 6 ft 2 in (1.88 m)
- Listed weight: 285 lb (129 kg)

Career information
- High school: Knappa
- College: Western Oregon
- NFL draft: 2014: undrafted

Career history
- San Jose SaberCats (2015); Los Angeles KISS (2016)

Awards and highlights
- ArenaBowl champion (2015)

Career AFL statistics
- Tackles: 16.5
- Sacks: 1
- Pass breakups: 1
- Stats at ArenaFan.com

Gustave Benthin (born February 10, 1991) is an American former professional football nose guard. Benthin played college football at Western Oregon University; following his graduation, he was invited to rookie minicamp on a tryout basis with the San Diego Chargers of the National Football League (NFL). After failing to make the team, he was assigned to the San Jose SaberCats of the Arena Football League (AFL). Benthin ended the 2015 season on the SaberCats' Injured Reserve; despite this, he collected his first AFL Championship when the SaberCats won ArenaBowl XXVIII at the end of the season. On December 14, 2015, Benthin was assigned to the Los Angeles KISS.
