= Svensen, Oregon =

Unincorporated community in the state of Oregon, United States

- Census-designated place
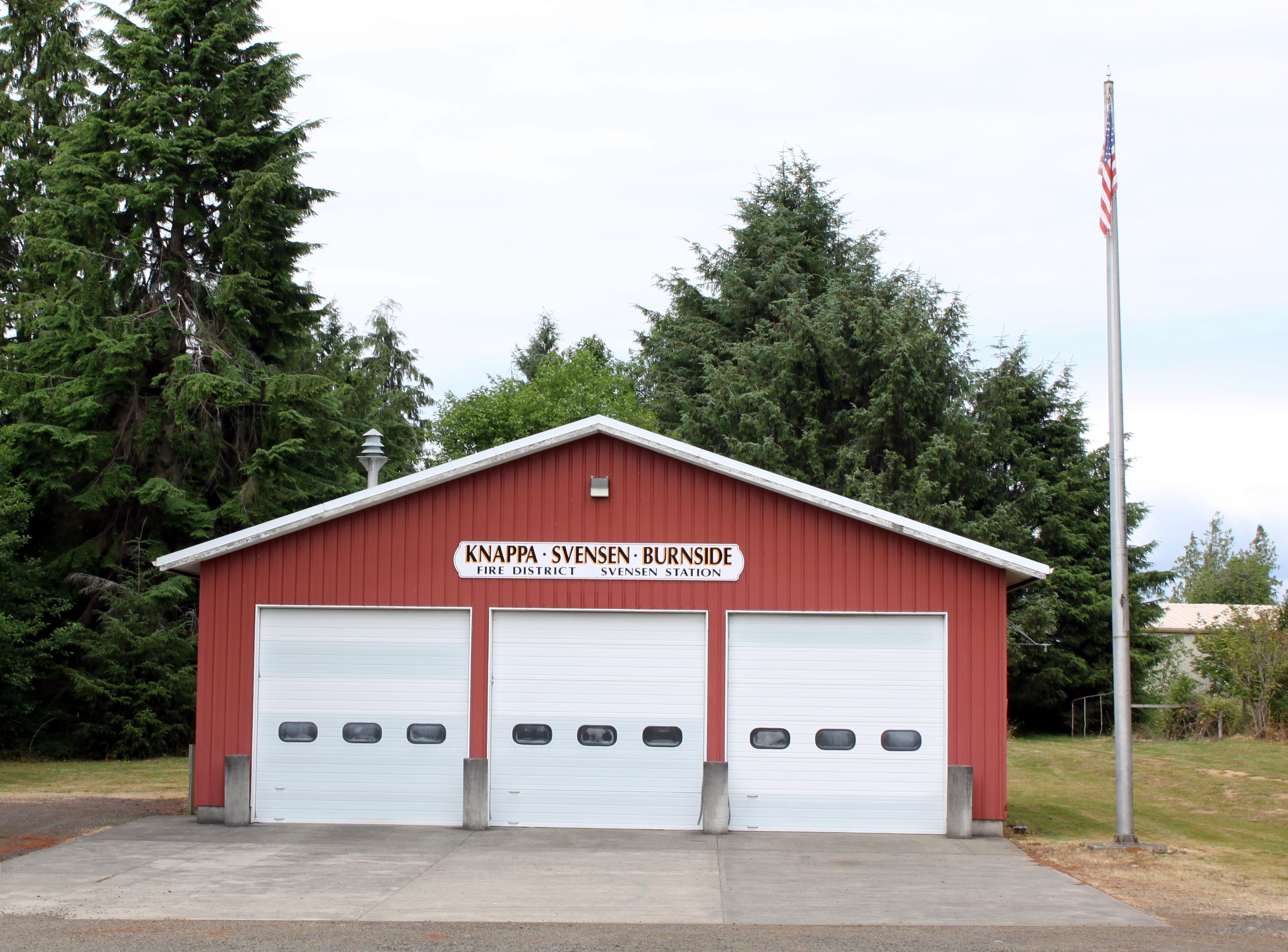
- Fire station

- Location within the state of Oregon Svensen (the United States)
- Coordinates: 46°09′15″N 123°39′10″W
- Country: United States
- State: Oregon
- County: Clatsop

Area
  - Total: 2.26 sq mi (5.86 km^{2})
  - Land: 2.24 sq mi (5.80 km^{2})
  - Water: 0.023 sq mi (0.06 km^{2})
- Elevation: 203 ft (62 m)

Population (2020)
  - Total: 853
  - Density: 380.9/sq mi (147.05/km^{2})
- Time zone: UTC-8 (Pacific (PST))
  - Summer (DST): UTC-7 (PDT)
- ZIP code: 97103
- Area codes: 503 and 971
- FIPS code: 41-71800
- GNIS feature ID: 2812874

Svensen is an unincorporated community and census-designated place (CDP) on the Columbia River in Clatsop County, Oregon, United States, named after early settler Peter Svensen. As of the 2020 census, Svensen had a population of 853. There was a post office in Svensen from 1895 to 1944. Since the closure of the Svensen Post Office, mail service has been provided by rural carriers of the Astoria, Oregon post office. Svensen is within the Knappa School District.

== Demographics ==
Historical population
Census	Pop.	Note	%±
2020	853		—
U.S. Decennial Census

== History ==
Svensen and Svensen Island are separated by Svensen Slough on the south side of the Columbia River at River Mile 24, between Settler's Point (downstream) and Knappa (upstream). The Lewis and Clark Expedition encamped in this area on November 26, 1805, en route to winter camp at Fort Clatsop. The Corps of Discovery again passed through the area on March 24, 1806 on their return journey.

== Education ==
It is in the Knappa School District 4. The comprehensive high school of that district is Knappa High School.

Clatsop County is in the boundary of Clatsop Community College.

== Gallery ==
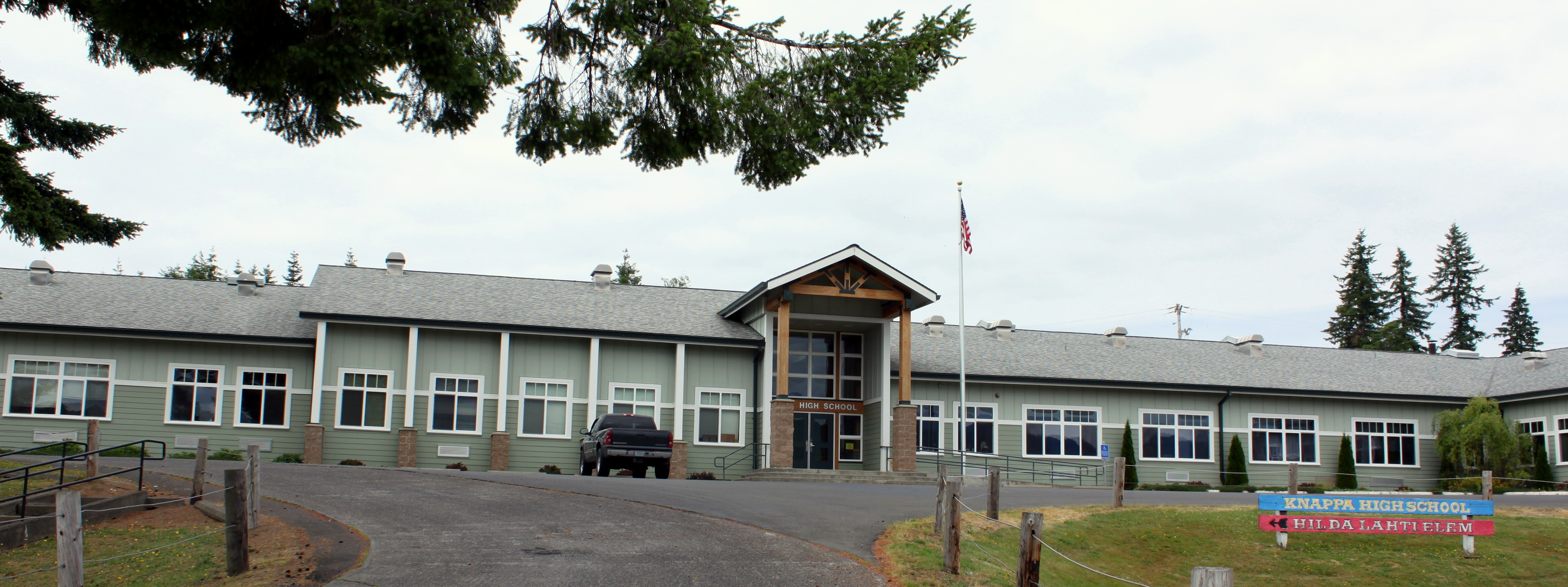
Knappa High School on Old Highway 30 Hilda Lahti Elementary School is located to the left behind the high school.

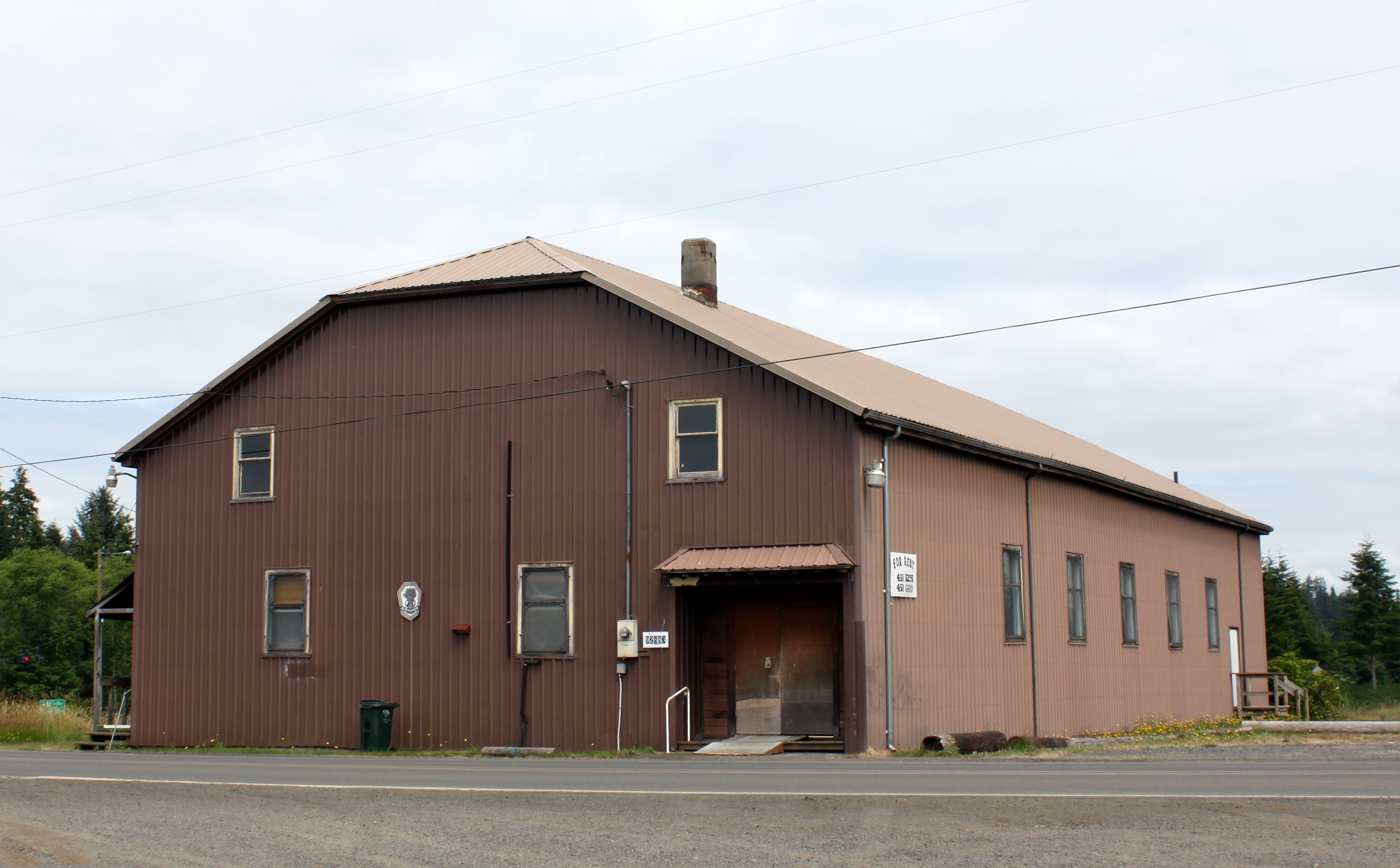
Wickiup Grange #722 Grange Hall

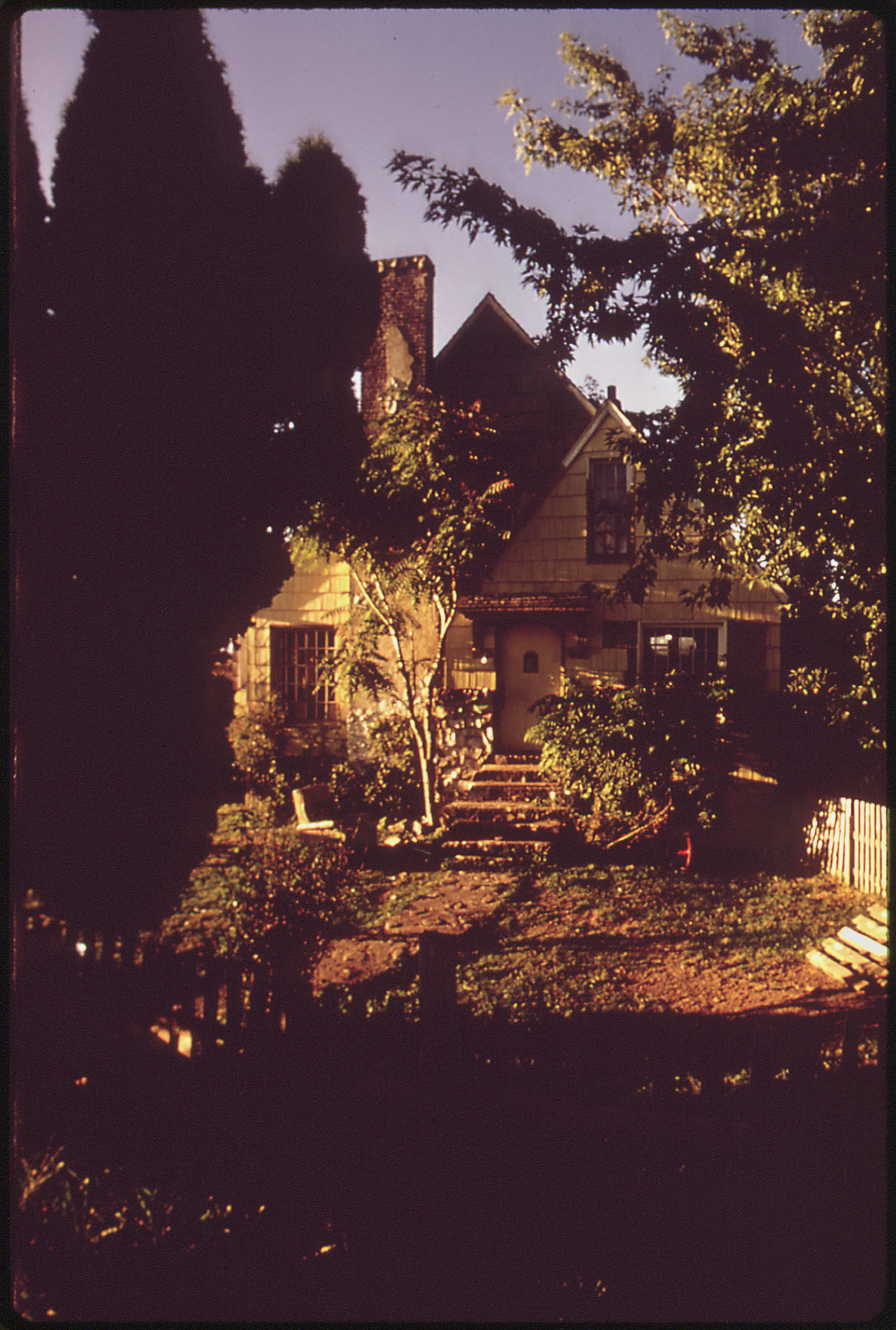
1972 photograph of a house near the river

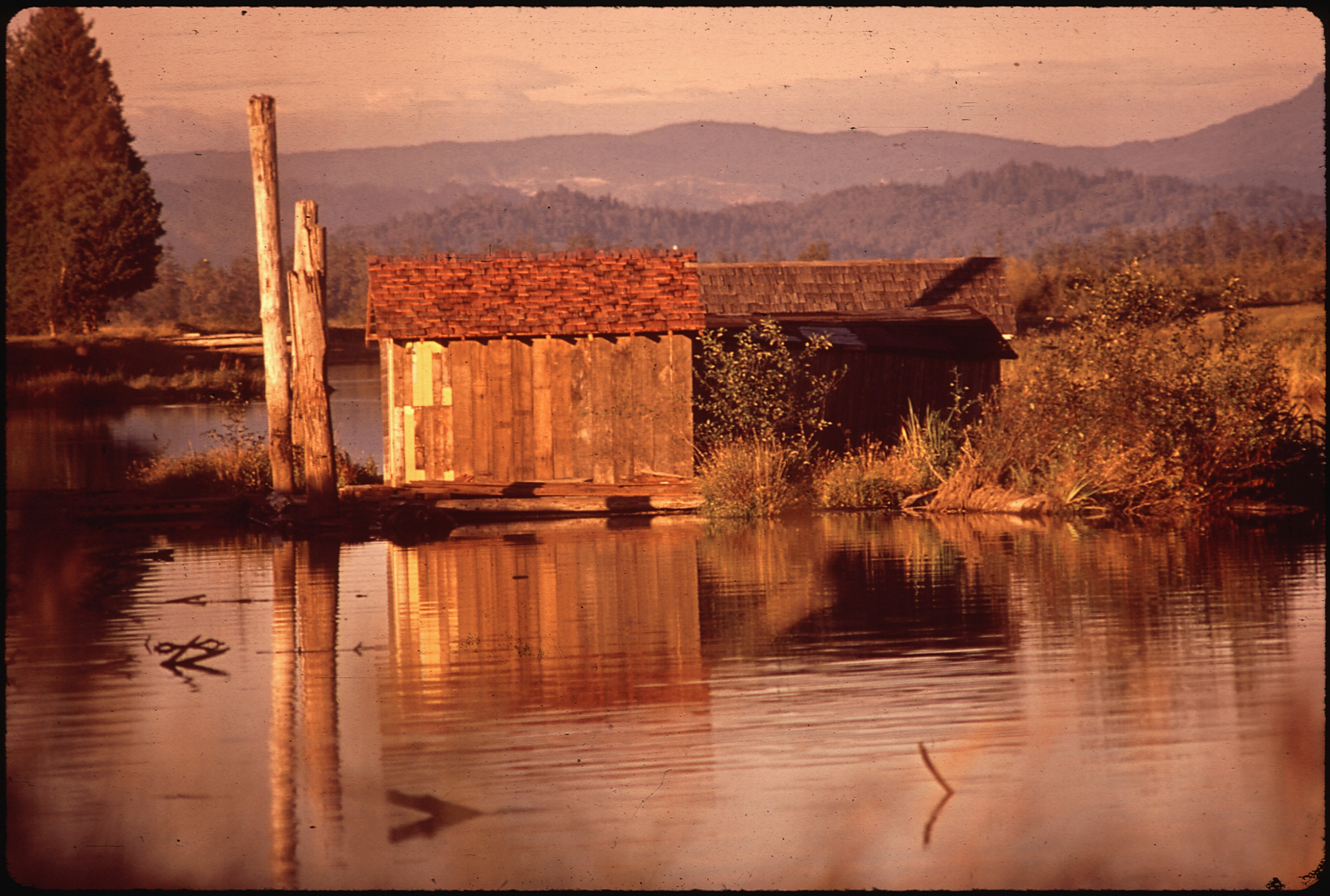
1972 photograph of a boathouse on the river
