= Guðmundur Guðmundsson =

Guðmundur Guðmundsson may refer to:

- Guðmundur Guðmundsson (handballer) (born 1960), former coach of the Icelandic men's handball team
- Guðmundur Guðmundsson (Mormon) (1825–1883), Mormon convert and missionary for The Church of Jesus Christ of Latter-day Saints to Iceland
- Erró (Guðmundur Guðmundsson, born 1932), Icelandic postmodern artist
- Guðmundur Guðmundsson (alpine skier) (1920–2007), Icelandic alpine skier
- Guðmundur Ívarsson Guðmundsson (1909–1987), Icelandic politician
