= John F. Kinney =

American politician (1816–1902)

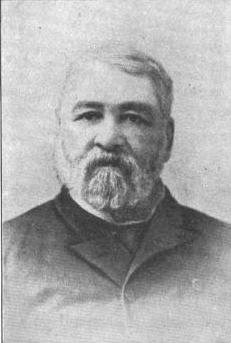

Justice of the Supreme Court of Iowa
- In office 1847–1854
- Appointed by: Ansel Briggs

Delegate to the U.S. House of Representatives from Utah Territory's at-large district
- In office March 4, 1863 – March 3, 1865
- Preceded by: John M. Bernhisel
- Succeeded by: William H. Hooper

Chief Justice of the Supreme Court of the Territory of Utah
- In office March 14, 1854 – May 15, 1858
- Appointed by: Franklin Pierce
- Preceded by: Lazarus H. Read
- Succeeded by: Delona R. Eckles
- In office June 26, 1860 – May 1863
- Appointed by: James Buchanan
- Preceded by: Delona R. Eckles
- Succeeded by: John Titus

Personal details
- Born: John Fitch Kinney; April 2, 1816 New Haven, New York, U.S.
- Died: August 16, 1902 (aged 86) Salt Lake City, Utah, U.S.
- Spouses: Hannah Hall (m. 1838–1895) Lucy Jane Leonard (m. 1899–1902)

John Fitch Kinney (April 2, 1816 – August 16, 1902) was a prominent American attorney, judge, and Democratic politician. He served as Justice of the Supreme Court of Iowa, twice as Chief Justice of the Supreme Court of the Territory of Utah and one term as the Territory of Utah's delegate in the House of Representatives of the 38th Congress.

== Biography ==
He was born in New Haven, New York, the fourth child and second son of Stephen Fitch Kinney (1789–1872) and Abby Brockway (1788–1824). Having completed public school and a more select school, he entered the Oswego Academy at age 16. After two years of higher learning there, he entered the law office of Orville Robinson, with whom he studied law for two and half years. He then moved to Marysville, Ohio, where he resumed his law studies. He was admitted to the bar in 1837 and began the practice of law in Marysville.

On December 29, 1838, Kinney and Hannah Hall (1816–1895) were married in Mount Vernon, Ohio. He lived there and practiced successfully until the summer of 1844, when he moved to Lee County, Iowa. He was twice elected secretary of the Territorial Legislative Council, in 1845 and 1846, and was prosecuting attorney for Lee County in 1846 and 1847. In June 1847, he was made president of the Democratic Convention, and before leaving Iowa City, which was then the capital of the new state, he was appointed, by Governor Briggs, as Justice of the Supreme Court of Iowa, to fill a vacancy. Kinney served in the office under the Governor's appointment for nearly two years. He was then elected Judge of the Supreme Court for six years, by the joint assembly of the Legislature. In January 1854, he resigned in order to remove to Utah Territory.

President Pierce had appointed Kinney as Chief Justice of the Supreme Court of the Territory of Utah, and he served in that position from January 1854 until 1857, just before the Utah War. He then removed to Nebraska City, Nebraska, where he resumed his law practice. He was re-appointed Chief Justice of the Territory of Utah by President Buchanan and served from June 26, 1860, until March 1863. He was directly involved in the events leading up to the Morrisite War of 1862, and allowed a condemnation of Territorial Governor Stephen S. Harding to be read into the public record after Harding issued a blanket pardon for all Morrisites convicted in connection with the war.

Kinney was elected as the Territory of Utah's Democratic Delegate to the 38th Congress and served from March 4, 1863, until March 3, 1865. He was not a candidate for re-nomination in 1864. He returned to Nebraska City, and resumed his law practice. In February 1867, President Johnson appointed Kinney a Special Indian Commissioner to visit the Sioux. He was appointed by President Arthur as agent of the Yankton Sioux in South Dakota, and served from December 11, 1884, until January 1, 1889, when he resigned, in order to escape the rigors of the northern climate, and again resumed the practice of law in Nebraska City.

In 1890, Kinney removed to San Diego, California. His wife Hannah died there on May 1, 1895. He was Chairman of the Democratic Central Committee in 1896, when San Diego County was carried for William Jennings Bryan in the Presidential election, and at the close of his official term, in 1898, received from the County Convention a vote of thanks and an expression of confidence for the able and satisfactory manner in which he had discharged his duties. Kinney was again married on May 9, 1899, to Lucy Jane Leonard (1826–1911), widow of Moses Thurston (1817–1873), a Mormon pioneer and old friend from Utah. Though they were married in San Diego, the Kinneys made their home in Salt Lake City.

John Fitch Kinney died at age 86 in Salt Lake City. His remains were then returned to San Diego, where he is interred in Mount Hope Cemetery, alongside his first wife.

== See also ==
- United States congressional delegates from the Territory of Utah

U.S. House of Representatives
Preceded by John Milton Bernhisel	Delegate to the United States Congress from the Territory of Utah; March 4, 1863 – March 3, 1865	Succeeded by William Henry Hooper
