= Governor Dawson =

Governor Dawson may refer to:

- John W. Dawson (1820–1877), Governor of Utah Territory
- William M. O. Dawson (1853–1916), 12th Governor of West Virginia
