= The Church of Jesus Christ of Latter-day Saints in Iceland =

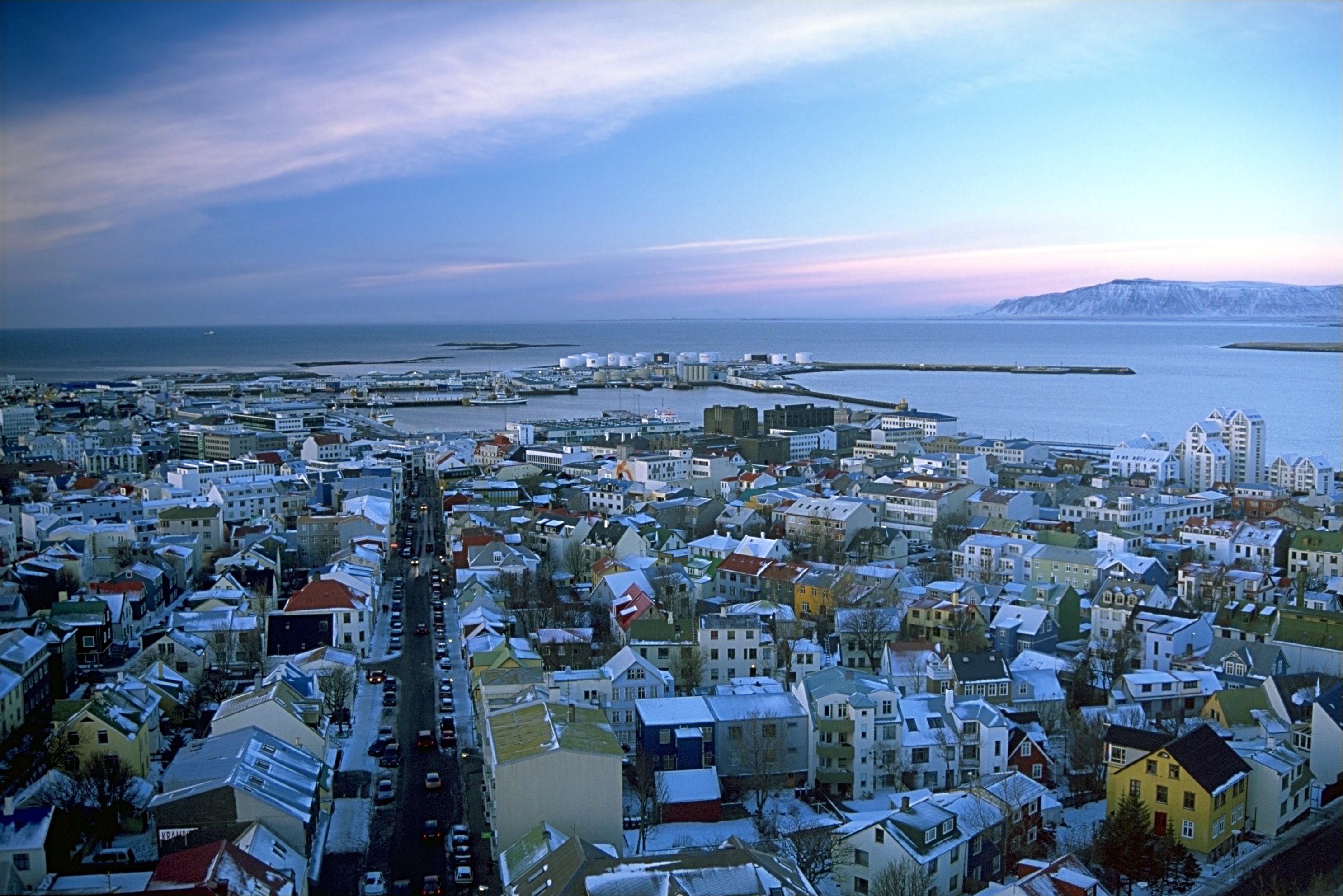
- Reykjavík, Iceland
- Area: Europe North
- Members: 445 (2025)
- Branches: 4
- FamilySearch Centers: 1

The Church of Jesus Christ of Latter-day Saints in Iceland refers to the Church of Jesus Christ of Latter-day Saints (LDS Church) and its members in Iceland. Missionary efforts of the Church of Jesus Christ of Latter-day Saints began in 1851 with the baptisms of two native Icelanders visiting Denmark. They returned to Iceland to share the gospel. Missionary work has continued since then, although there were no permanent missionaries in Iceland from 1914 to 1974. As of December 31, 2025, The Church of Jesus Christ of Latter-day Saints had 445 members in Iceland, divided into three congregations. There is also one Family History Center. On January 22, 2023, a Spanish language branch was created in Reykjavík bringing the number of congregation to four.

== History ==
Membership in Iceland
Year	Membership
1976	10
1979	87
1989*	200
1999	248
2009	241
2019	300
2025	445
*Membership was published as an estimate. Source: Wendall J. Ashton; Jim M. Wall, Deseret News, various years, Church Almanac Country Information: Venezuela

=== 1850–1855: Early missionary efforts ===
The first Mormons in Iceland were Thorarinn Thorason (or Hafliðason) and Guðmundur Guðmundsson, who were both baptized in 1851 under the direction of Erastus Snow. They were introduced to the gospel and baptized in Denmark while learning trades. They returned to Iceland expecting to share the gospel with their friends and family, only to find that they were mocked often. However, they were able to convert Benedikt Hansson and his wife. After their baptisms, however, Guðmundsson and Thorason were forbidden from preaching in Iceland. Thorason's wife was strongly opposed to his missionary efforts and threatened to drown herself if he continued. In response, Thorason stopped his missionary efforts, but remained a faithful church member until his accidental death (by drowning) in December 1851.

Guðmundsson persisted in missionary efforts, but lacked the authority to perform baptisms. After he wrote to the church leaders in Copenhagen reporting of 24 people who wanted to be baptized, Elder John Lorentzen was sent to Iceland to serve as Guðmundsson's missionary companion in 1853. Guðmundsson was ordained to the office of an elder in the priesthood and helped organize the first church branch, or small congregation, in Iceland on June 19, 1853 in the Westman Islands. Guðmundsson went back to Denmark in 1854.

Early church members were encouraged to emigrate to the United States, which contributed to the mass emigration of Icelanders the 1850s and later decades. A group of 16 mormons left Iceland in 1855 and immigrated to the Salt Lake Valley. Brigham Young sent them to settle in Spanish Fork, Utah, in the late 1850s.

=== 1855–1914: Slow growth and opposition to the church ===
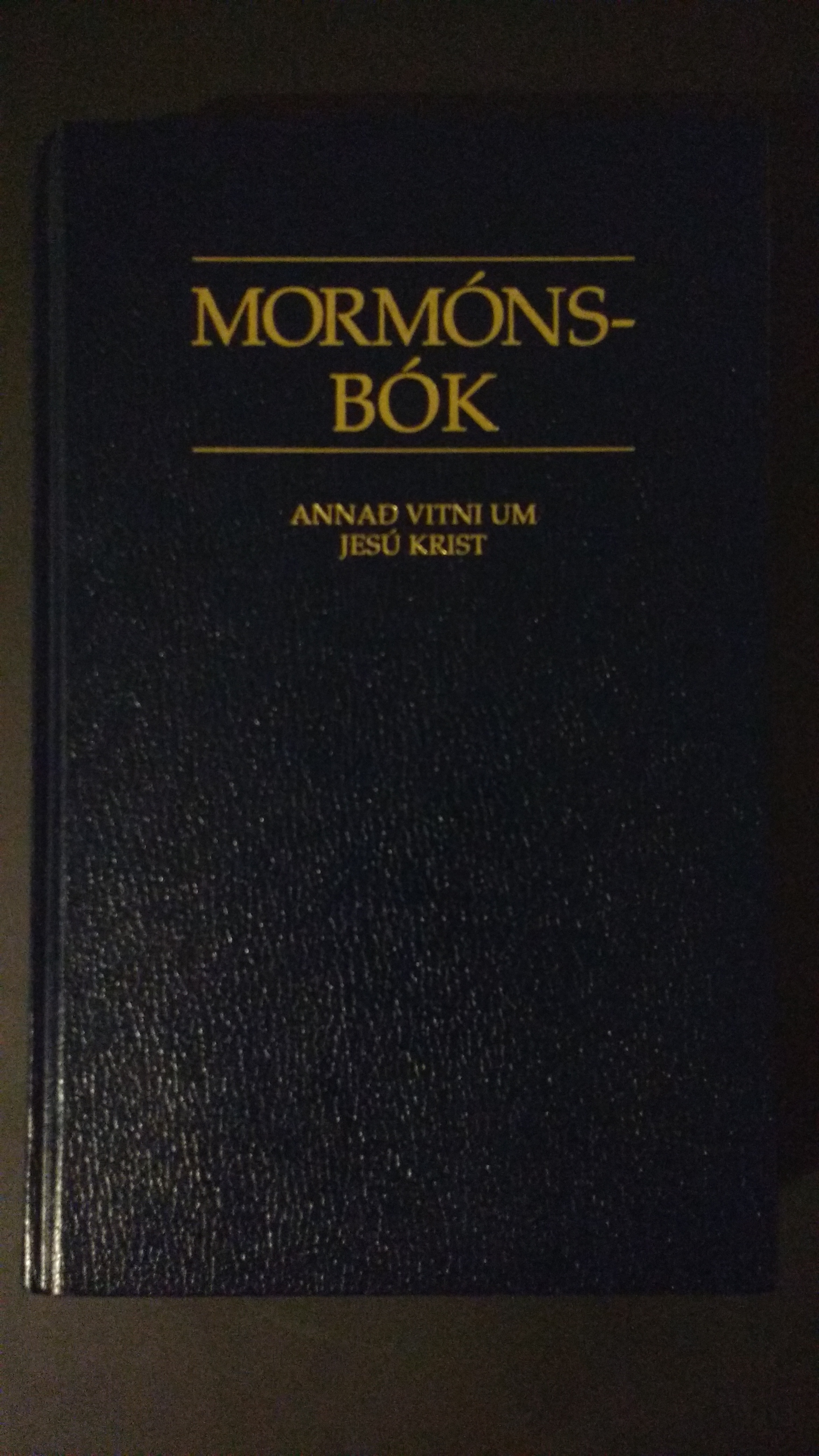
Icelandic language translation of the Book of Mormon

While many members of the church immigrated to Utah, between 1873 and 1914, 22 native Icelandic saints living in Utah were called on missions to Iceland. Missionaries sent in 1873 began preaching again in the Westman Islands, but faced strong opposition. These missionaries left the following year, but had organized a small branch there. Other pairs of missionaries continued to be sent to the islands, and in 1879 they began preaching on the mainland.

A section of The Book of Mormon was translated into Icelandic in 1881 by convert Jon Jonsson, who was living in the Spanish Fork settlement at the time. While it appears that he intended to copy the entire book, Jonsson only translated the First Book of Nephi. He also compiled a book of psalms in Icelandic and even wrote some Icelandic hymns for saints to sing in their native tongue.

An Icelandic Mission was established in 1894, but it was dissolved in 1900 largely due to persecution. Missionary work during this time was largely unsuccessful, with few baptisms. Missionaries often reported hardships they faced from opposition and unfavorable weather. By 1906, there were only 36 reported church members in Iceland. Missionary work ceased in Iceland in 1914, and did not resume until 1975,

=== 1914–1974: A time without missionaries ===
Because the Icelandic Mission was closed and there was much opposition to the church, there were no permanent missionaries assigned to Iceland between 1914 and 1974. Some missionaries were sent to Iceland in 1930, however, to check up on the status of the saints. Although they were assigned to the Danish Mission, they spent a few months in Iceland during the summer. In 1955 Spencer W. Kimball, serving as an apostle of The Church of Jesus Christ of Latter-day Saints, wrote to the president of the church at the time, David O. McKay, and suggested that Iceland receive missionaries once again. While missionaries were not sent at that time, another opportunity for missionary work arose when David B. Timmins, a member of the church, was assigned to work as the American Consul at the U.S. Embassy in Iceland. He arrived in 1958 and was asked many questions by locals about the church and Utah. Timmins was invited to give a lecture on Mormonism at the University of Iceland. Timmins was, however, reassigned and left Iceland in 1960. Danish missionaries were sent once again to the area two years later to see if Icelanders were receptive to their teachings. These missionaries suggested to their mission president that experienced missionaries be assigned to Reykjavík. However, missionary efforts were not formally organized until the Geslison family was called to serve in Iceland in 1974.

=== 1975–present ===
Missionaries returned to Iceland in 1975 with the arrival of Byron and Melva Geslison and their two sons in April. Missionary work continued as part of the Danish mission. One of the major obstacles to spreading the gospel in the country was that the church lacked materials printed in the Icelandic language. Byron Geslison worked to get filmstrips translated into Icelandic to be used in church meetings, open house programs, and to be shown in public schools in 1976. Sveinbjörg Gudmundsdóttir, a convert to the church in 1976, began translating the entire Book of Mormon and other church publications into Icelandic after her baptism. Another branch of the church was organized in Reykjavík on 8 August 1976. It started with only 10 members and grew to 40 by the following year. Melba Geslison helped organize the Relief Society in the country, and other auxiliaries like Young Men and Young Women were organized as well. Iceland was dedicated for preaching the gospel in 1977 by Joseph B. Wirthlin.

The Book of Mormon was translated into Icelandic and published by the church in 1981. The Church of Jesus Christ of Latter-day Saints became formally recognized by the government in November 1983. The Geslisons returned to Iceland on two more missions and saw the completion of a visitors center and the organization of a branch in Akureyri. Church members across the country were asked to participate in missionary work by serving three-month missions in 1988. In 1994 the church translated the temple ceremony and recorded the voices of native Icelanders. In July 2000 the church dedicated the first meetinghouse in the country. That year, Gordon B. Hinckley, serving as president of the church, visited the saints in Iceland. Latter-day saints were recognized in a permanent museum exhibit at the Vestmannaeyjar Folk Museum.

== Congregations ==
Meetinghouses & Historic Monument in Iceland
Purple = Meetinghouse
Gold = Historic Monument
(FHC) = Family History Center

As of August 2026, the following congregations were located in Iceland:

- Akureyri Branch
- Reykjavík 1st Branch
- Reykjavík 2nd Branch (English)
- Selfoss Branch

All congregations not in a stake are named branches, regardless of size.

== Mission ==
Missionary efforts are conducted under the Denmark Copenhagen Mission, with 8 Elders assigned to Iceland.

== See also ==
- The Church of Jesus Christ of Latter-day Saints in Denmark
