= Morrisite War =

Conflict in United States history

- Part of the Mormon Wars
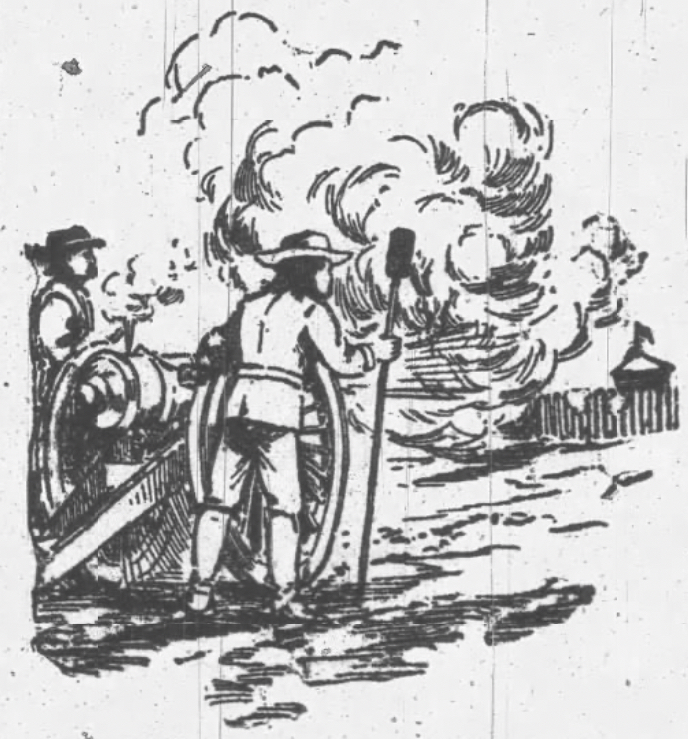
- Utah Milita to firing warning shots at the Morrisite camp
Date	June 1862
Location	South Weber, Utah 41.1467°N 111.9688°W
Result	Utah Territory victory

Belligerents
Morrisites	Utah Territory

Commanders and leaders
Joseph Morris †	Robert T. Burton

Strength
200-500	500–1,000 posse

Casualties and losses
8 killed	1 killed

The Morrisite War was a skirmish between a Latter Day Saint sect known as the "Morrisites" and the Utah territorial government in June 1862.

== Morrisites ==
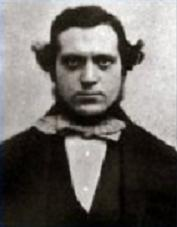
Joseph Morris, leader of the Church of the Firstborn (Morrisites)

In 1857 Joseph Morris, an English convert to The Church of Jesus Christ of Latter-day Saints in Utah, reported receiving revelations naming him the Seventh Angel from the Book of Revelation. He wrote to Brigham Young to seek recognition of his calling from the church.

In 1860, Morris began to collect followers to a group that was commonly known as the Morrisites. In February 1861, John Taylor and Wilford Woodruff excommunicated him. On April 6, 1861, he organized the Church of the Firstborn and called all of his followers to gather at Kington Fort, a 3-acre (12,000 m^{2}) fort on the Weber River which had been abandoned in 1858. By fall 1861, the group contained several hundred followers.

Morris told his followers that the Second Coming was imminent and not to bother with planting crops. They may have trampled some of their crops into the ground as evidence of their faith. The group pooled available supplies and waited at Kington Fort.

== Dissension ==
By spring 1862, food was scarce and some members were becoming discontented. Morris repeatedly designated certain days for the Second Coming, only to have those days pass uneventfully. Each time that happened, a handful of members would recover their possessions from the community pool and leave the congregation.

With the steady outflux of members, the question of property entitlement became contentious. Those who stayed behind felt those who left were taking better stock and other items than they had initially contributed to the community pool. Soon afterward, three departing members (William Jones, one of Morris's first converts, John Jensen, and Lars C. Geertsen) vowed revenge after what they perceived as an unfair reckoning, and they seized a load of wheat en route from Kington to Kaysville for milling. The Morrisites sent a group of men after them, and the group soon captured the three and the wheat. The church held the men prisoner in a small cabin, to be "tried by the Lord when he came."

== Government involvement ==
Geertsen soon escaped, but the other men's wives petitioned the territorial government for assistance. Word reached John F. Kinney, who had been appointed two years earlier by James Buchanan as chief justice of the Utah Territory, that the Morrisites were illegally holding prisoners. On May 24, he issued a writ of habeas corpus commanding the prisoners' release. U.S. Marshal Judson Stoddard brought the writ to Kington Fort and read it to the Morrisite leaders, who refused to receive it.

== Kington Fort siege ==
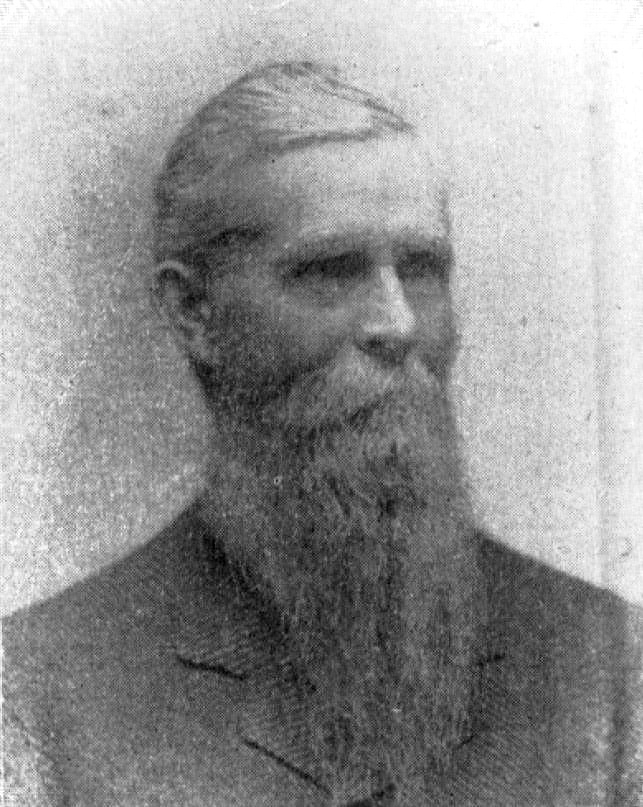
Robert Burton, deputy marshal of the territorial marshal service and Commander of the territorial militia

After the Morrisites dishonored a similar writ three weeks later, Chief Justice Kinney asked the acting governor to activate the territorial militia as a posse comitatus to arrest the Morrisite leaders. On June 12 a 200-man armed posse departed Salt Lake City for the fort, 30 miles (48 km) north. Robert T. Burton, as deputy marshal, led the posse, which gathered strength along the way and was somewhere between 500 and a 1000 strong when it reached the settlement on June 13. By then, the Morrisites had barricaded themselves in the fort.

The posse positioned itself on bluffs southwest of the fort, with contingents on the flats to the east and the west. They situated cannons on two small ridges looking directly into the fort, which in order to accommodate the hundreds of followers was really a makeshift enclosure. A militia from Ogden positioned itself to the north.

Burton sent a message via a Morrisite herd-boy requesting the group's surrender within thirty minutes. As soon as he received the message, Morris left his associates and soon returned with a new revelation, promising his people that the posse would be destroyed. He and his counselors had a bugle sounded to gather the congregation and read the revelation.

When the group did not respond within thirty minutes, Burton ordered two warning shots fired "to speed up the decision." The second ball ricocheted off the ground and into the fort, killing two women and shattering the jaw of Mary Christoffersen. Some Morrisites returned the fire, killing the 19-year-old Jared Smith of the posse, the only government casualty of the war.

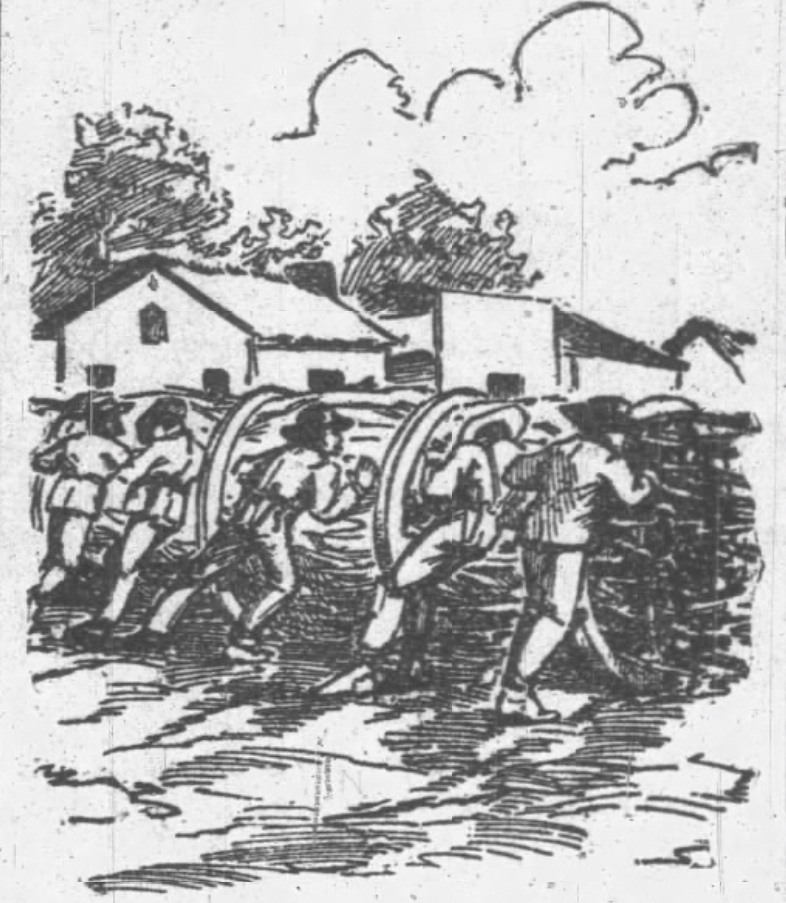
While Burton entered the fort, soldiers of the Utah Militia advanced on the Morrisite camp, using a makeshift shield, pushing up while returning fire

Heavy rains prevented much action the next day, June 14. Historians differ as to what initiated the events of June 15, but at some point, Burton rode into the fort with a small contingent. Details of what followed are also unclear, but Morris may have made a statement to his followers and approached Burton in what was interpreted as a threatening manner. Burton shot and killed him, and two women were also killed in the resulting melee. Morris's counsellor John Banks was mortally wounded. Burton took ninety men prisoner and marched them back to Salt Lake City the next morning to stand trial before Judge Kinney.

== Aftermath ==
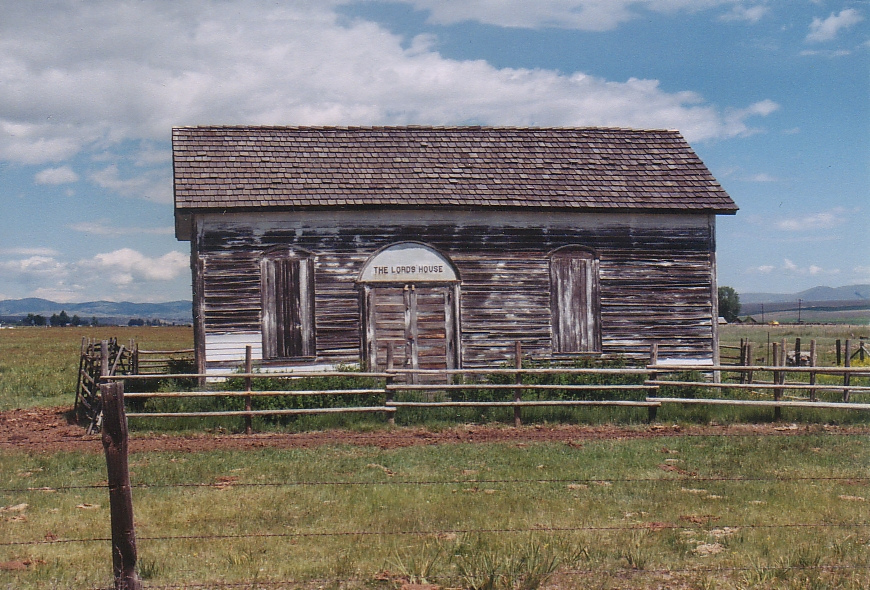
Morrisite meetinghouse visible on the west side of Interstate 90 south of Deer Lodge

Seven of the Morrisites were convicted of second-degree murder in March 1863, and another 66 were convicted of resistance. However, Stephen S. Harding, the new federally-appointed territorial governor, pardoned them all three days after the conviction. The Morrisites scattered across the west, but many of them ended up in Deer Lodge County, Montana. A house of worship used by the Morrisites in Racetrack, Montana, still stands though in some disrepair (46.2885°N 112.7493°W).

Seven years later, Robert T. Burton was tried and acquitted for the murder of Isabella Bowman, one of the women killed after the siege.

== Commemoration ==
Morrisite War monument at South Weber, Utah

A monument commemorating the Morrisite War was erected in South Weber, Utah, by the Daughters of Utah Pioneers, Sons of Utah Pioneers, and AllBuild Construction and Landscaping.

== See also ==
- Gudmund Gudmundson
- Mark Hill Forscutt

== Sources ==
- C. LeRoy Anderson, For Christ Will Come Tomorrow: The Saga of the Morrisites (1981).
