= Lazarus Hammond Read =

American judge (c. 1815–1855)

Lazarus Hammond Read (or Reed; c. 1815 – March 1855) was chief justice of the Supreme Court of the Utah Territory in 1852.

He served as District Attorney in Steuben County, New York. He was appointed to the Supreme Court of the Utah Territory by U.S. President Millard Fillmore.

Read resigned because of ill-health and was not in Utah for long. He returned to the East where he died in March 1855.

Political offices
Preceded by Lemuel G. Brandebury	Justice of the Utah Territorial Supreme Court; 1852–1852	Succeeded by John F. Kinney
