= Kirtland Temple Suit =

United States legal case

The Kirtland Temple Suit (formally Reorganized Church of Jesus Christ of Latter Day Saints v. Williams) is an 1880 Ohio legal case that is often cited as the case that awarded ownership of the Kirtland Temple to the Reorganized Church of Jesus Christ of Latter Day Saints (RLDS Church, now Community of Christ). Though the case was dismissed by the court, the publication of the court's findings of fact—as if they had been the decision of the court—reinforced the belief by members of the RLDS Church and others that the court had considered the RLDS Church, and not the Church of Jesus Christ of Latter-day Saints (LDS Church), the rightful legal successor to the Latter Day Saint church established by Joseph Smith in 1830.

== Background ==
Under the direction of Joseph Smith, Latter Day Saints in Kirtland, Ohio, constructed the Kirtland Temple from 1833 to 1836. Smith and the majority of Latter Day Saints ultimately left Kirtland, settling in Nauvoo, Illinois. After Smith was killed in 1844, a number of churches arose, all of which claimed to be the rightful successor to Smith's church. Among those claiming to be a continuation of Smith's church were the Utah-based LDS Church, and the RLDS Church, led by Smith's son Joseph Smith III.

In 1860, a probate court in Lake County, Ohio, ordered that the Kirtland Temple be sold in order to settle still-outstanding debts that Joseph Smith's estate owed to various Kirtland residents. In 1862, the building was sold to William L. Perkins, a local businessperson. On the day of purchase, Perkins conveyed the temple to Russell Huntley in a quitclaim deed. Huntley invested over $2,000 in the property, which was badly in need of repair, hoping to establish a new organization of Saints at Kirtland Temple under the authority of early Mormon apostle John E. Page. After the failure of this attempted Latter Day Saint church, Huntley sold his title to Kirtland Temple on 17 February 1873, for $150, to Joseph Smith III and Mark Hill Forscutt.

== Reason for the suit ==
In 1875, Smith and Forscutt attempted to sell the Kirtland Temple to the city of Kirtland in order to pay several pressing personal debts. However, the sale did not proceed because there were doubts surrounding Smith and Forscutt's ownership, since their title was based on a quitclaim deed. Smith pressed the RLDS Presiding Bishop, Israel A. Rogers, to issue a quit claim deed so that he could proceed with the sale; Rogers, instead, demanded the same of Smith on behalf of the Church. Smith insisted that if he were to issue a quit claim deed, it would only open up the church to lawsuits based on the provenance of the Huntley deed, and insisted that the only sensible remedy was for the church to bypass the line of ownership through Huntley and sue to reclaim its ownership as the successor to the original church.

As a result, in 1878 Rogers filed suit in the Lake County Court of Common Pleas, requesting that the court conclude that the RLDS Church held legal title to the Kirtland Temple.

Among others, the RLDS Church named Smith, Forscutt, and John Taylor, the president of the LDS Church, as defendants in the action. Taylor was named as a defendant because the RLDS Church anticipated that the LDS Church might claim ownership of the temple. However, neither Taylor nor other members of the LDS Church were likely aware of the suit because notice of the suit was limited to publication in the Painesville Telegraph, a local newspaper published in Painesville, Ohio.

== Judgment ==
On February 23, 1880, Judge L. S. Sherman of the Court of Common Pleas dismissed the case, in that the RLDS Church did not have possession, but opining in its findings that the RLDS Church was the true successor and had the right to possess the properties of the original church.

Kim L. Loving, an attorney and former president of the Eastern Great Lakes Mission Center of the Community of Christ in Kirtland, Ohio, explained why the case was dismissed: "Suffice it to say that, legally, the Court dismissed the default case of the plaintiff, the Reorganized Church, because it failed to allege or prove one of the essential elements of a statutory cause of action to quiet title in Ohio, that the plaintiff was in possession of the property. As such, the involuntary dismissal, or nonsuit, legally was not an adjudication on the merits of the truth or falsity of the plaintiff’s contentions. Findings of fact in such a case are not legally binding on anyone, least of all upon absent defendants. It could be inferred that E. L. Kelley should have known as much, but failed to broach or explore these ramifications with the leaders of the Church."

Though frequently misrepresented as the original product of Judge Sherman, the findings of fact in the case were written as a proposed judgment by E. L. Kelley, attorney for the RLDS Church. In the political climate of the late nineteenth century, it is not surprising that Judge Sherman entered Kelley's proposed judgment into the findings, regarding the legitimacy of RLDS Church claims to and the deviation of the LDS Church from the original church tenets and structures. Opinion of the LDS Church was usually unfavorable during the period, and judicial and legislative interference in LDS Church matters was at an all-time high due to polygamy and the perception of theocratic ties with Utah Territory. Other government officials had looked to the RLDS Church as an acceptable form of Mormonism that was free of polygamy and a political vision of Zion, and hoped to support RLDS Church leaders to undermine their counterparts in the LDS Church.

Publishing the ruling without mention that the case had been dismissed, Kelley strengthened public opinion that the RLDS Church was "the True and Lawful continuation of, and successor to the said original Church of Jesus Christ of Latter Day Saints, organized in 1830, and is entitled in law to all its rights and property." Furthermore, the findings stated that the LDS Church was not the lawful successor to the original Latter Day Saint church because it "has materially and largely departed from the faith, doctrines, law, ordinances and usages of the said original Church of Jesus Christ of Latter Day Saints". The findings specifically cited certain beliefs held by members of the LDS Church, including the doctrines of celestial marriage and plural marriage as well as the so-called Adam-God doctrine, as being "contrary to the laws and constitution of said original Church".

While their attempt to clear the title was ultimately dismissed, the RLDS Church began maintaining the temple on the basis of the court's opinion that it was the lawful successor of the original church. Although the 1880 case had no legal bearing, the church secured clear title to the temple through adverse possession by 1901. In dire need of repair from the late-nineteenth to mid-twentieth centuries, without a restoration of the building as undertaken by RLDS Church caretakers it is unlikely the building would be standing today. The RLDS Church, which was renamed Community of Christ in 2001, remained the owner of the Kirtland Temple until 2024, when the LDS Church bought the Kirtland Temple, along with other historic sites in Nauvoo and various historic documents, for 192.5 million dollars.

== Disputed legacy ==
Though the court dismissed the case, the publication of the findings of fact filed by the attorney representing the RLDS Church in the Painesville Telegraph effectively gave the false impression that the Kirtland Temple Suit had been won. The March 15, 1880, issue of the RLDS Church organ Saints' Herald also omitted the last two sentences which stated that the case was dismissed. Therefore, the case has been celebrated within the RLDS Church for its determination that the RLDS Church—and not the LDS Church—was the lawful successor to Joseph Smith's original organization.

The legal meaning of the dismissal—whether it strengthened or overturned RLDS Church claims to the temple—is contested amongst historians and others to this day.

In 1942, E. Guy Hammond, an Akron, Ohio attorney, wrote to RLDS Church leader Israel A. Smith: "From your letter I get the impression that you still cling to the notion that Judge Sherman's decision in Common Pleas at Painesville might be relied on. For my part, I cannot see, as explained before, that this decision can have the least effect, other than to dismiss the case, and to deny the relief prayed for. And if we should rely on it in any respect, in the first instance, it would but give the adversary opportunity to make us ridiculous."

As late as 1986, historian Roger D. Launius, however, still upheld that "[i]t would be quibbling to suggest that the outcome of the Kirtland Temple Suit did not give the Reorganized church legal ownership of the property."

In 2004, Loving countered: "These polemical proclamations of victory may have carried some weight in the court of public opinion .... The only difficulty, at least from today's perspective, was that the Reorganization's polemical proclamations of judicially determined legitimacy actually had no legal basis whatsoever. In fact, the legal result of the lawsuit was that the title stood exactly as it had before the case was filed; legally, nothing had been accomplished. This finding goes to the very essence of the matter and can hardly be dismissed as mere 'quibbling'."

== See also ==
- Temple Lot Case
