= Lemuel G. Brandebury =

American judge (1810–1875)

Lemuel G. Brandenburg

Chief Justice of the Utah Territory Supreme Court
- In office March 12, 1851 – June 7, 1852
- Appointed by: Millard Fillmore
- Succeeded by: Lazarus Hammond Read

Personal details
- Born: January 1, 1810 Cumberland, Pennsylvania
- Died: March 10, 1875 (aged 56) Washington, D.C.

Lemuel Green Brandebury (Note: Various sources also spell his last name as Brandenbury, Bradenbury, Bradenburg, or Brandeberg.) (January 1, 1810 – March 10, 1875) was an American judge who in 1851 served as the first chief justice of the Supreme Court of the Utah Territory. He later became a public critic of the Church of Jesus Christ of Latter-day Saints and its then practice of polygamy.

Brandebury was from Shippensburg, Pennsylvania, and had a brother, C. B. Brandebury. He was a member of the Carlisle, Pennsylvania Bar and worked with C. B. Penrose in Philadelphia.

Brandebury was appointed to the territorial court by President Millard Fillmore on March 12, 1851, after Joseph Buffington declined the position due to insufficient compensation. Brandebury was the first non-Mormon territorial official to arrive, and was honored by a banquet and several dances. Brigham Young described Brandebury as "an inconspicuous lawyer", and despite the initial good relations, Brandebury quickly found himself feeling unwelcome in Utah, returning to Washington with the other non-Mormon members of the territorial government as one of the "Runaway Officials of 1851" to denounce the local government in the territory.

Brandebury did not return to the territory thereafter. Five years later, Young asserted in a speech that Brandebury had been doing odd legal jobs in Washington, D.C., to make a living, and would have fared better had he stayed in the territory.

During the Civil War, Brandebury served in the Engineer Regiment of the West in the Union Army.

He later worked for many years in the Department of the Treasury. In 1875, he died suddenly in Washington, D.C. of apoplexy, aged 65.

== Notes ==
Political offices
Preceded by Newly established court	Justice of the Utah Territorial Supreme Court; 1851–1851	Succeeded by Lazarus Reed
