= Gudmund Gudmundson =

Icelandic Mormon missionary

Gudmund Gudmundson (Icelandic: Guðmundur Guðmundsson) (March 10, 1825 – September 21, 1883) was one of the first Icelanders to join the Church of Jesus Christ of Latter-day Saints (LDS Church) and was among the first Mormon missionaries to preach in Iceland.

Gudmundson was born in Artun, Rangárvallasýsla, Iceland. He was christened a Lutheran on March 23, 1825.

In 1845, Gudmundson moved to Denmark to study goldsmithing. In 1851, while living in Copenhagen, Gudmundson heard LDS Church missionaries Peter O. Hansen and Erastus Snow preaching Mormonism. He was baptized into the LDS Church on February 15, 1851, by Hansen, and on April 18, 1851, he was given the Aaronic priesthood and ordained a teacher by Snow.

On May 21, 1851, Gudmundson travelled to Vestmannaeyjar to preach. Shortly thereafter, he went back to his hometown of Artun to preach, but found no one willing to listen to his message. Gudmundson continued preaching in Iceland until July 1854. Eventually, he was given the Melchizedek priesthood by one of his missionary companions, after which he baptized nine individuals into the LDS Church. On June 19, 1853, the first branch of the LDS Church in Iceland was established on Vestmannaeyjar, with Gudmundson as branch president.

In July 1854, Gudmundson returned to Denmark to preach. He spent most of his time on Zealand and was imprisoned for preaching Mormonism in Kalundborg. He was released after seven weeks, but was immediately conscripted into the Danish army. After just over one year, Gudmundson was released from military service due to ill health.

On April 18, 1857, Gudmundson left Copenhagen on a ship bound for America. He arrived in the Salt Lake Valley in Utah Territory on September 13, 1857. While emigrating to Utah, Niels Garff, one of Gudmundson's Danish converts, grew ill and died. Just prior to his death, Garff asked Gudmundson if he would marry his wife after he had died. Gudmundson agreed, and on October 4, 1857, Gudmundson and Marie Garff were married in Salt Lake City. They had three sons together. After arriving in Utah, Gudmundson began using the Anglicised form of his name.

In the early 1860s, Gudmundson and his wife became involved with the Church of the Firstborn, a schismatic sect of Latter Day Saints led by Joseph Morris. They were excommunicated from the LDS Church, and Gudmundson became a member of the Quorum of the Twelve Apostles of the Morrisites. Gudmundson was involved in the Morrisite War and was afterwards arrested and fined $100 for resisting arrest. He was later pardoned by territorial governor Stephen S. Harding.

Following the Morrisite War, the Gudmundsons ended their affiliation with the Morrisites and lived in Utah County, Utah, and Sacramento, California. In 1869, they moved to Draper, Utah Territory and were rebaptized into the LDS Church. In 1871, they moved to Lehi, Utah Territory.

Gudmundson died in Logan, Utah Territory, while living there temporarily with one of his stepsons. He was buried in Draper.

== See also ==
- The Church of Jesus Christ of Latter-day Saints in Iceland
