= William Henry Hooper =

American politician (1813–1882)

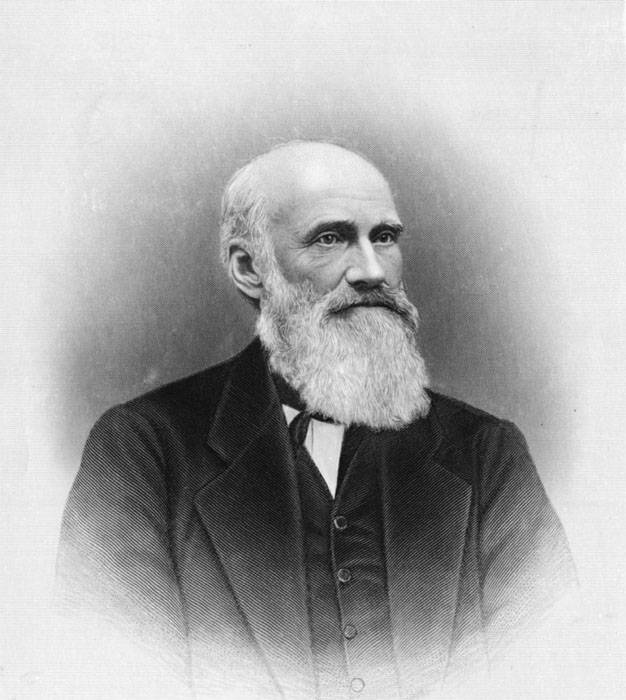

Delegate to the U.S. House of Representatives from Utah Territory's at-large district
- In office March 4, 1859 – March 3, 1861
- Preceded by: John Milton Bernhisel
- Succeeded by: John Milton Bernhisel
- In office March 4, 1865 – March 3, 1873
- Preceded by: John F. Kinney
- Succeeded by: George Q. Cannon

Personal details
- Born: December 25, 1813 Cambridge, Maryland, U.S.
- Died: December 30, 1882 (aged 69) Salt Lake City, Utah Territory, U.S.
- Resting place: Salt Lake City Cemetery; 40°46′37.92″N 111°51′28.8″W
- Party: Democratic

William Henry Hooper (December 25, 1813 – December 30, 1882) was a U.S. congressional delegate from the Territory of Utah, United States.

Born in Cambridge, Maryland, Hooper attended the common schools. He engaged in mercantile pursuits and moved to Illinois in 1835 and settled in Galena, Illinois, where he engaged in trade on the Mississippi River. While in Illinois, he became a member of the Church of Jesus Christ of Latter Day Saints. He was a Mormon pioneer and moved to Utah Territory in 1850 and settled in Salt Lake City. Hooper was secretary of Utah Territory in 1857 and 1858.

Hooper was elected as a Democrat to the Thirty-sixth Congress (March 4, 1859 – March 3, 1861). He was an unsuccessful candidate for reelection in 1860 to the Thirty-seventh Congress, being defeated by John Milton Bernhisel. Hooper served as member of the Utah Territorial Legislature in 1862.

On October 10, 1867, Hooper became a member of the Council of Fifty of the Church of Jesus Christ of Latter-day Saints.

Hooper was elected to the Thirty-ninth and to the three succeeding Congresses (March 4, 1865 – March 3, 1873). He was not a candidate for renomination in 1872 and was succeeded by George Q. Cannon. He engaged in mercantile pursuits and mining operations in Salt Lake City.

Hooper was superintendent of Zion's Cooperative Mercantile Institution (ZCMI) from 1873 to 1877, and its president from 1877 to 1882. He served as president of the Deseret National Bank, Salt Lake City, from 1872 until his death in Salt Lake City. He was interred in Salt Lake City Cemetery.

Hooper is the namesake of Hooper, Utah.

== See also ==
- United States congressional delegates from Utah Territory

== Notes ==
U.S. House of Representatives
Preceded by John Milton Bernhisel	Delegate to the U.S. House of Representatives from Utah Territory; 1859-1861	Succeeded by John Milton Bernhisel
Preceded by John F. Kinney	Delegate to the U.S. House of Representatives from Utah Territory; 1865-1873	Succeeded by George Q. Cannon
