= Mark Hill Forscutt =

English hymn writer in Latter Day Saint movement (1834–1903)

Mark Hill Forscutt (19 June 1834 – 18 October 1903) was an English hymn writer and a leader in several denominations of the Latter Day Saint movement. A convert to the Church of Jesus Christ of Latter-day Saints (LDS Church), Forscutt broke with that denomination for a number of reasons, not the least of which was the practice of plural marriage. Forscutt went on to serve in leadership positions in the Morrisite sect and later in the Reorganized Church of Jesus Christ of Latter Day Saints (RLDS Church).

Forscutt was born in Godmanchester, England. When Forscutt joined the LDS Church as a 19-year-old in 1853, his father disowned him and insisted that he move out of his childhood home. From 1855 to 1860, Forscutt was a missionary for the LDS Church in England.

Forscutt was married in March 1860 to fellow Latter-day Saint Elizabeth Unsworth. On their marriage day, Forscutt and his wife began their emigration to Utah Territory with the intention of joining the gathering of Latter-day Saints in Salt Lake City. Upon arriving in Utah, he became a secretary to Brigham Young, the president of the LDS Church. Shortly after his arrival, Forscutt began to learn about the Mormon practice of plural marriage, which he had not been aware of previously. This discovery, combined with other disagreements with Brigham Young, led Forscutt to disassociate himself from the LDS Church. Forscutt became affiliated with a group led by Joseph Morris; he was an apostle in the Morrisite organization and was involved in the 1861 Morrisite War. After these incidents, Forscutt joined the United States Army unit at Fort Douglas in Salt Lake City and was stationed in Ruby Valley (now Nevada) before returning to Salt Lake City.

In 1865, Forscutt joined the RLDS Church in Salt Lake City. He soon left the territory. Forscutt became a close personal friend of Joseph Smith III. Forscutt later served as a full-time missionary for the RLDS Church in England and the Society Islands. He was a copyist in the process that led to the publication of the Joseph Smith Translation of the Bible in 1866. Forscutt composed a number of hymns and was the editor of Saints' Harmony, an RLDS Church hymnal published in 1889.

Forscutt was a preacher in the RLDS Church until his death. On 2 May 1879, Forscutt preached the sermon at the funeral of Emma Smith Bidamon, the widow of Joseph Smith Jr. and mother of Joseph Smith III.

Mark and Elizabeth Forscutt were the parents of three children Amy Forscutt Parr, Ruby Forscutt Faunce, and Mark Zenas Forscutt. They divorced in 1867.

== See also ==
- Kirtland Temple Suit
