= Knappa High School =

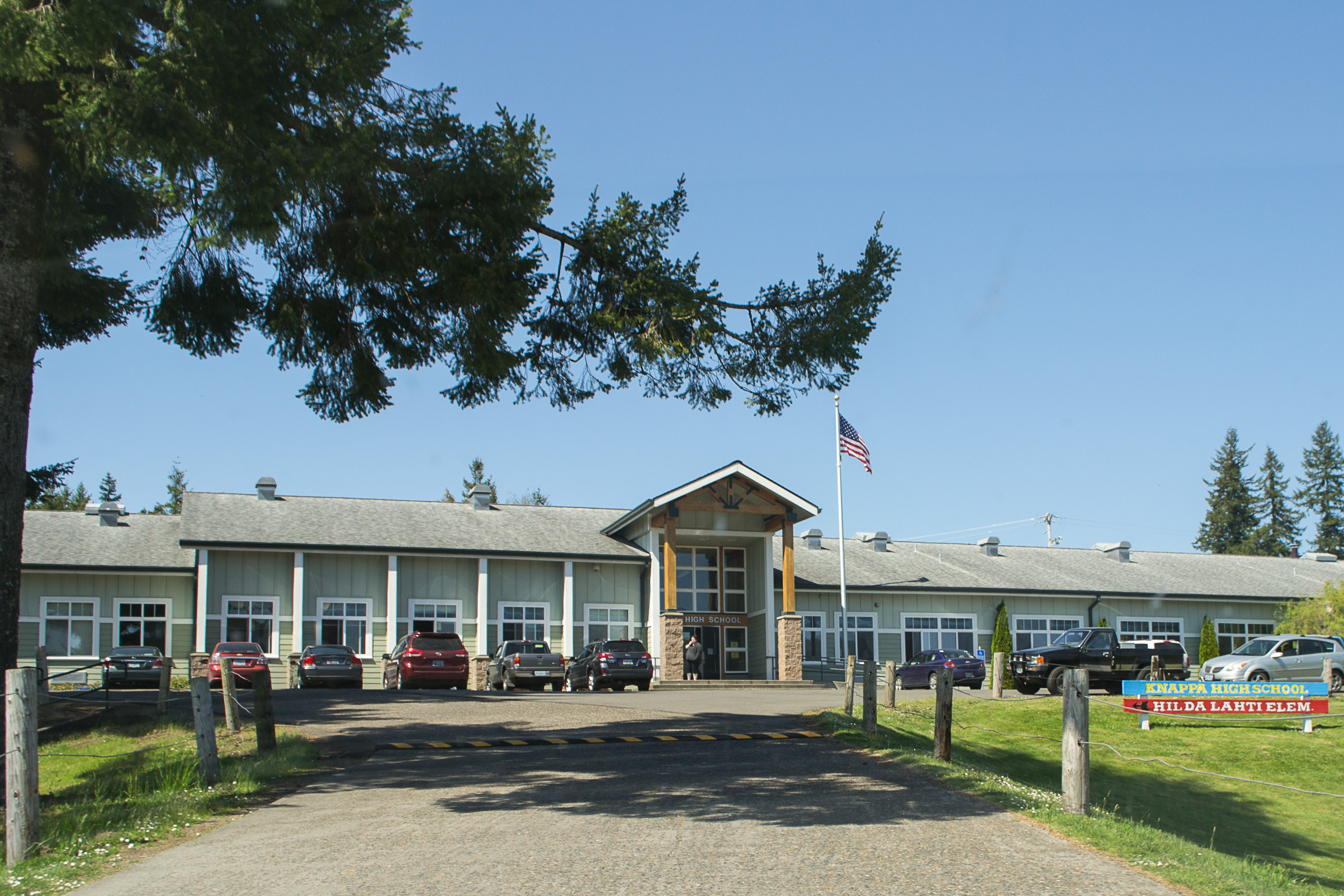

Location
- 41535 Old Highway 30; Astoria, (Clatsop County), Oregon 97103; United States
- Coordinates: 46.162508°N 123.623148°W

Information
- Type: Public high school
- School district: Knappa School District
- Principal: Paul Isom
- Teaching staff: 11.01 (FTE)
- Grades: 9-12
- Enrollment: 139 (2023–2024)
- Student to teacher ratio: 12.62
- Colors: Royal and gold
- Athletics conference: OSAA Northwest League 2A-1
- Mascot: Logger
- Website: Knappa HS website

Knappa High School is a public high school near Knappa, Oregon, United States. The school is located on Old Highway 30, 12 miles east of Astoria and 90 miles from Portland, between Svensen and Knappa. The Knappa School District (of which this is the sole comprehensive high school) serves the unincorporated communities of Knappa, Svensen, Burnside and Brownsmead.

Knappa High School's first class graduated in 1919.

The Knappa school district has won baseball championship in 2009, 2015, 2016, and in 2017.

== Academics ==
In 2008, 85% of the school's seniors received a high school diploma. Of 47 students, 40 graduated, five dropped out, and two were still in high school in 2009.
