= John Milton Bernhisel =

American physician

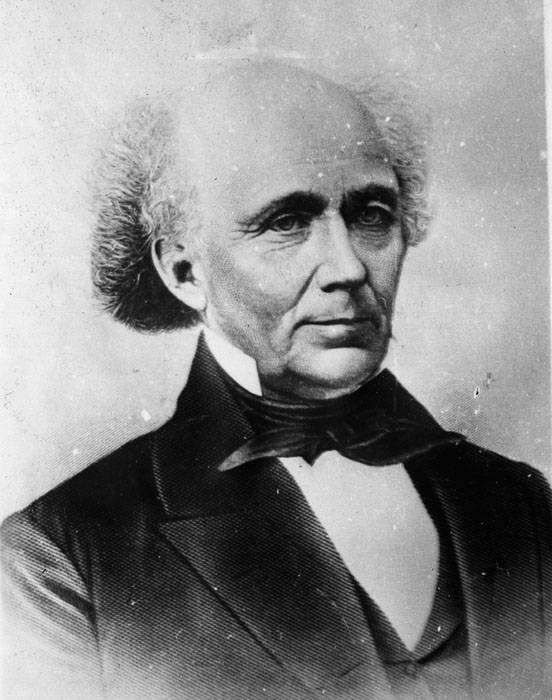

Delegate to the U.S. House of Representatives from Utah Territory's at-large district
- In office March 4, 1851 – March 3, 1859
- Succeeded by: William H. Hooper
- In office March 4, 1861 – March 3, 1863
- Preceded by: William H. Hooper
- Succeeded by: John F. Kinney

Personal details
- Born: June 23, 1799 Tyrone Township, Pennsylvania, U.S.
- Died: September 28, 1881 (aged 82) Salt Lake City, Utah, U.S.
- Resting place: Salt Lake City Cemetery; 40°46′37.92″N 111°51′28.8″W
- Party: Independent
- Education: University of Pennsylvania
- Occupation: Doctor

John Milton Bernhisel (born John Martin Bernheisel; June 23, 1799 – September 28, 1881) was an American medical doctor, politician, and early member of the Latter Day Saint movement. He was a close friend and companion to both Joseph Smith and Brigham Young. Bernhisel was the original delegate of the Utah Territory in the United States House of Representatives (1851–59, 1861–63) and acted as a member of the Council of Fifty of the Church of Jesus Christ of Latter-day Saints (LDS Church).

== Early life and education ==
Bernhisel was born at Sandy Hill, Tyrone Township, near Harrisburg, Pennsylvania. His name at birth was John Martin Bernheisel, which he changed as an adult. He earned a degree in medicine from the University of Pennsylvania School of Medicine in 1827 and began practicing medicine in New York City.

== Career ==
After becoming affiliated with the Latter Day Saint movement, he moved to Nauvoo, Illinois, in 1843. Bernhisel served as the personal physician to Joseph Smith, and lived in his home. He delivered some of Emma Smith's children.

In June 1844, Bernhisel accompanied Joseph Smith to the Carthage Jail and spent some time with Smith and his brother Hyrum in the jail, but Bernhisel was not present at the time of Joseph Smith's death at the hands of a mob.

After Smith's death, Bernhisel followed Brigham Young and moved west with the majority of the Latter-day Saints. He settled in Salt Lake City, Utah Territory, in 1848 and continued the practice of medicine.

Bernhisel was selected by Young to represent the interests of the Latter-day Saints before Congress when the Mormon settlers began to consider an application for statehood as the State of Deseret. He was selected to the Thirty-second and to the three succeeding Congresses (March 4, 1851 – March 3, 1859). Longtime Washington journalist Benjamin Perley Poore described Bernhisel during those years as "a small, dapper gentleman, who in deportment and tone of voice resembled Robert J. Walker":

It was very rarely that he participated in debate, and his forte was evidently taciturnity. In private conversation he was fluent and agreeable, defending the peculiar domestic institutions of his people.

After returning briefly to his medical practice, he also ran and served in the Thirty-seventh Congress (March 4, 1861 – March 3, 1863). Bernhisel also served as regent of the University of Utah.

== Personal life ==
Bernhisel was a bachelor until he was 46 years old (March 1845), when he married Julia Ann Haight, the widow of William Van Orden and mother of five children. The couple had one child, also named John Milton Bernhisel (born in 1846). Like many early LDS Church members, Bernhisel went on to practice plural marriage. He was married to seven women, but by 1850, all of them but Elizabeth Barker had left the family for various reasons. He died at his home in Salt Lake City on September 28, 1881, and is interred at the Salt Lake City Cemetery.

== See also ==
- United States congressional delegates from Utah Territory
- Joseph Smith Translation of the Bible: Publication and use

== Notes ==
U.S. House of Representatives
Preceded by office created	Delegate to the U.S. House of Representatives from Utah; 1851-1859	Succeeded by William H. Hooper
Preceded by William H. Hooper	Delegate to the U.S. House of Representatives from Utah; 1861-1863	Succeeded by John F. Kinney
