= The Church of Jesus Christ of Latter-day Saints in Denmark =

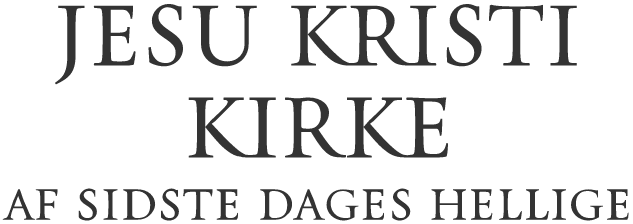
- (Logo in Danish)

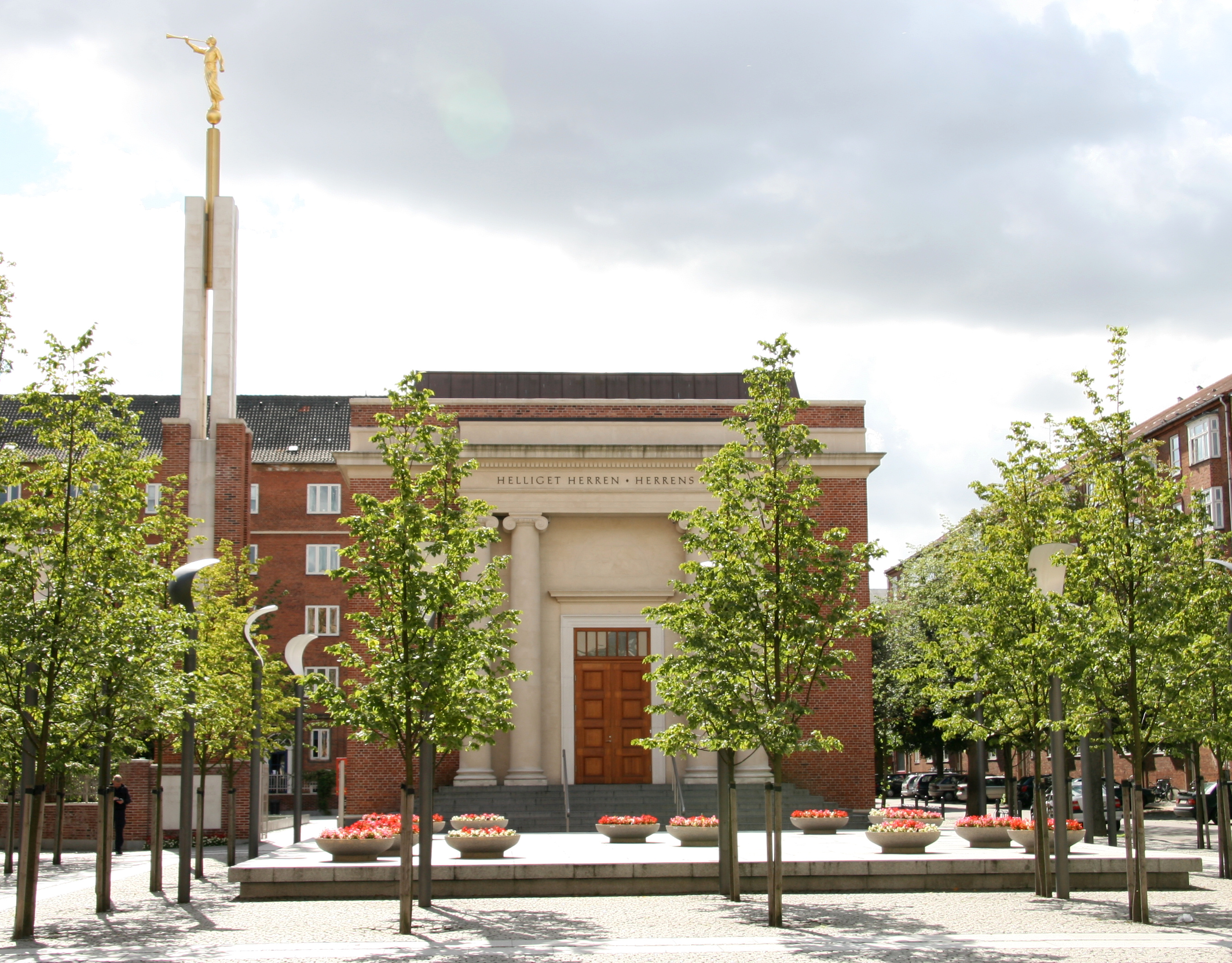
- The Copenhagen Denmark Temple
- Area: Europe North
- Members: 4,426 (2025)
- Stakes: 2
- Wards: 13
- Branches: 8
- Total Congregations: 21
- Missions: 1
- Temples: 1 operating
- FamilySearch Centers: 13

The Church of Jesus Christ of Latter-day Saints in Denmark refers to the Church of Jesus Christ of Latter-day Saints (LDS Church) and its members in Denmark.

== History ==
Membership in Denmark
Year	Members
1930	1,408
1940	1,521
1950	1,933
1960	2,192
1970	4,246
1980	4,486
1989*	4,300
1999	4,527
2009	4,362
2019	4,466
2025	4,426
*Membership was published as an estimate or rounded number. Source: Windall J. Ashton; Jim M. Wall, Deseret News, various years, Church Almanac Country Information: Denmark

During the October 1849 general conference of the LDS Church in Salt Lake City, it was decided to send missionaries to several European nations. Erastus Snow, Peter O. Hansen, and George P. Dykes were sent to Denmark where they arrived in 1850 and quickly established a congregation in Copenhagen. The first converts were from the Baptists but later ones included Lutherans, the official state religion. Denmark had recently put in place a new constitution, which granted freedom of religion for the first time. Nevertheless, some of the early missionaries were imprisoned due to government opposition to the preaching of Mormonism.

While in Denmark, Snow baptized the first Icelander converts to the LDS Church.

Snow's and his missionary companion, Peter O. Hansen, worked together on translating the Book of Mormon into the Danish language. When it was completed in 1851, it was the first time the book had been printed in a language other than English. By 1882, 8,000 copies of the book had been printed in the Danish language.

During the 19th century, there were more converts from Denmark than any other country in Europe excepting England, and Scotland. Many of the early converts (up to 17,000) immigrated to Utah, as was common practice among European converts at the time. The first immigrants were led back to Utah by Erastus Snow. Reasons to immigrate included to get away from the anti-Mormon attitude of many Danes and to avoid conscription in the Danish army during the Second Schleswig War. One early Danish convert, Anthon H. Lund, immigrated to Utah as a child and later became president of the Quorum of the Twelve Apostles and a counselor in the First Presidency of the church.

The first stake was organized in Copenhagen in 1974 with Johan H. Benthin as president. In 2004, the temple was completed, having been converted from an older building that was used as an LDS chapel since its construction in 1931. Prior to that, the Danish members attended the Swiss Temple.

== Stakes and Congregations ==
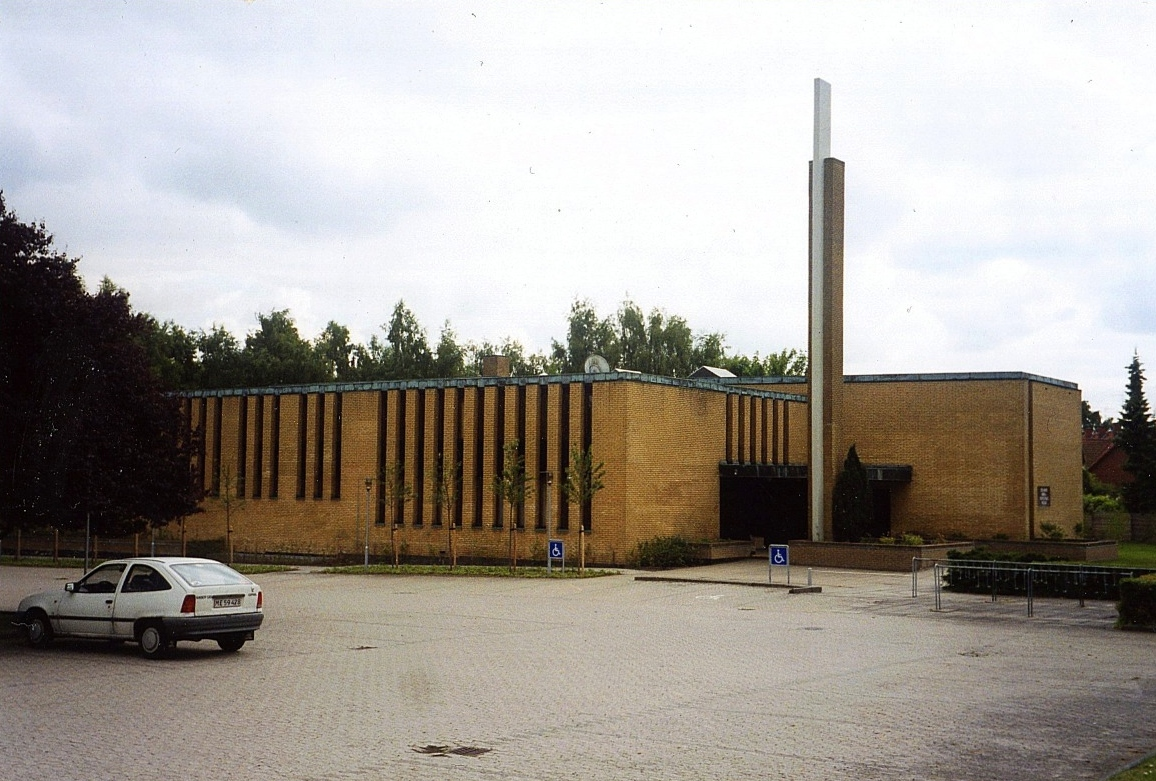
A meetinghouse in Søborg.

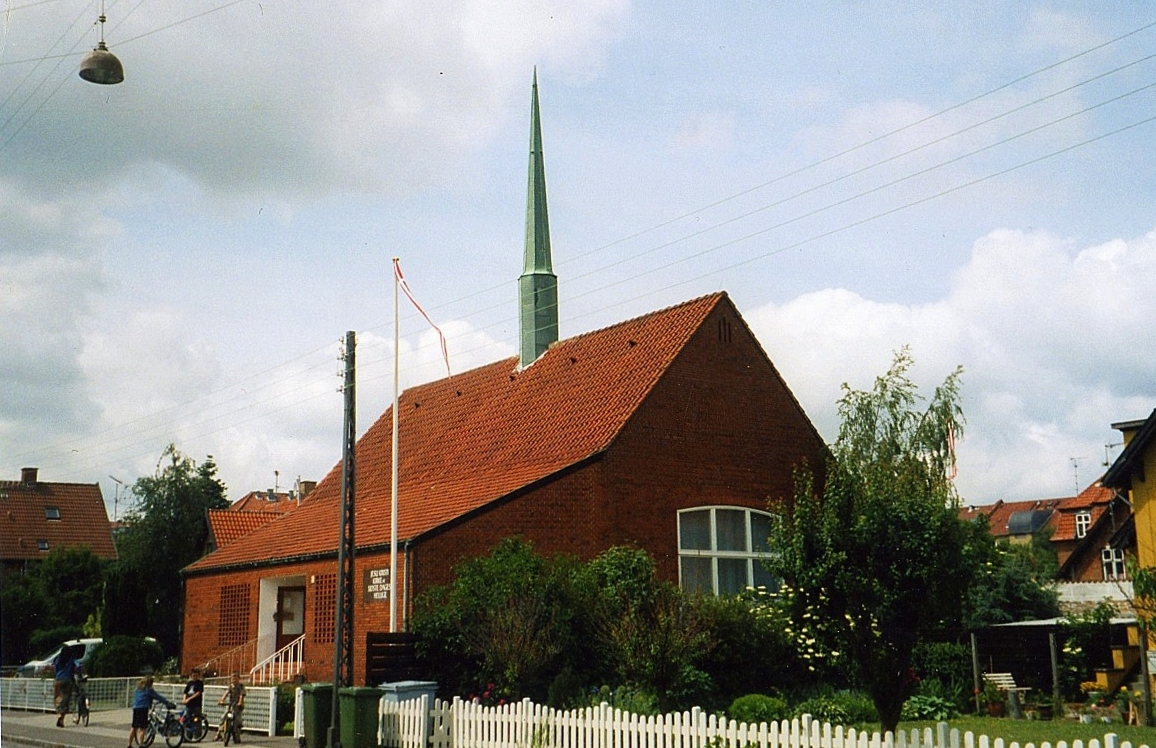
A meetinghouse on Amager Island.

As of August 2026, the following congregations are located in Denmark:

Copenhagen Denmark Stake

- Allerød Ward
- Amager Branch
- Frederiksberg Ward
- Gladsaxe 1st Ward
- Gladsaxe 2nd Ward
- Nykøbing-Falster Branch
- Roskilde Ward
- Rønne Branch
- Slagelse Ward

Aarhus Denmark Stake

- Ålborg Ward
- Arhus Ward
- Esbjerg Ward
- Fredericia Ward
- Frederikshavn Branch
- Horsens Ward
- Midtjylland Branch
- Odense 1st Ward
- Odense 2nd Ward
- Randers Branch
- Sønderborg Branch

== Missions ==
The Denmark Copenhagen Mission includes Denmark and Iceland. This mission also includes the Faroe Islands and Greenland although church presence is very limited (if any) in these territories.

== Temples ==
118. Copenhagen Denmark Temple; Official website; News & images	
Location: Announced: Groundbreaking: Dedicated: Size: Style:	Frederiksberg, Denmark; 17 March 1999 by Gordon B. Hinckley; 24 April 1999 by Spencer J. Condie; 23 May 2004 by Gordon B. Hinckley; 25,000 sq ft (2,300 m^{2}) on a 0.6-acre (0.24 ha) site Neo-classical, detached single-spire design - designed by Arcito

== See also ==
- Religion in Denmark
