= Church of the Firstborn (Morrisite) =

Sect of the Latter Day Saint movement

The Church of the Firstborn was a sect of the Latter Day Saint movement that formed as an offshoot of the Church of Jesus Christ of Latter-day Saints (LDS Church) in 1861 and was involved in the Morrisite War. Its adherents were known as Morrisites, and schismatic sects have been defunct since 1969, excepting the Order of Enoch.

== History ==
=== Origins ===
In 1857, Joseph Morris, an English convert to the LDS Church, reported receiving revelations naming him the Seventh Angel from the Book of Revelation. He wrote church president Brigham Young to seek recognition of his calling from the church. Young did not respond to the request from Morris, or any of his subsequent letters through 1860.

In 1860, Morris began to collect followers to a group that became known as the Morrisites. In February 1861, apostles John Taylor and Wilford Woodruff excommunicated Morris from the LDS Church. On April 6, 1861, Morris and his followers organized the Church of the Firstborn and called all of his followers to gather at Kingston (Kington) Fort, a 3-acre (12,000 m^{2}) fort on the Weber River that had been abandoned in 1858. By midsummer 1861, the group reached 300 followers.

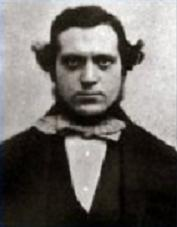
Joseph Morris, leader of the Church of the Firstborn

Morris told his followers that the Second Coming was imminent and not to bother with planting crops. They may have trampled some of their crops into the ground as evidence of their faith. The group pooled available supplies and waited at Kingston Fort.

=== Membership ===
An eight-page Roll of Membership, Names of Persons Baptized into the Fulness of the Gospel was published in San Francisco in 1886. An introduction to the roll reads: "Names of persons baptized during the administration of Joseph Morris, at South Weber, Utah Territory, in the years of 1861 and 1862." The Roll of Membership then lists alphabetically the names of 430 individuals. At the conclusion of the list the publisher notes: "All the names that we found in the record book are in this list. We feel assured that there were many persons baptized whose names were not recorded."

=== Leadership ===
A copy of the Roll of Membership housed in the Archives of the Community of Christ includes notations in pencil identifying those in positions of authority next to the following individuals: John Banks, Prescy.; John Cook, Apostle; Richard Cook, Presidency; James Cowan, Apostle; James Dove, apostle; John R. Eardley, Apostle; Mark Hill Forscutt, Apostle; Gudmund Gudmundson, Apostle; William Harris, Bishop; Niels Jacobson, Apostle; John E. Jones, Apostle; William Kendell, Apostle; R. J. Livingstone, Apostle; James Mather, Apostle; John Parson, Apostle; Abraham Taylor, Apostle; John Trolsen, Apostle.

=== Morrisite War ===
Monument describing the June 1862 "Morrisite War" in South Weber, Utah

By spring 1862, food was scarce and some members were becoming discontented. Morris repeatedly designated certain days for the Second Coming, only to have those days pass uneventfully. Each time that happened, a handful of members would recover their possessions from the community pool and leave the congregation.

With the steady outflux of members, the question of property entitlement became contentious. Those who stayed behind felt those who left were taking better stock and other items than they had initially contributed to the community pool. Soon after three departing members—William Jones, one of Morris's first converts, John Jensen, and Lars C. Geertsen—vowed revenge after what they perceived as an unfair reckoning, they seized a load of wheat en route from Kingston to Kaysville for milling. The Morrisites sent a group of men after them, and the group soon captured the three and the wheat. The church held the men prisoner in a small cabin, to be "tried by the Lord when he came."

Eventually, the Utah territorial militia was ordered to arrest Morris and the other leaders of the church. In the resulting confrontation sometimes called the "Morrisite War," Morris was killed in a skirmish on June 15, 1862, and other Morrisite leaders were taken prisoner.

A monument commemorating the Morrisite War stands in South Weber, Utah.

=== Scattering and regathering ===
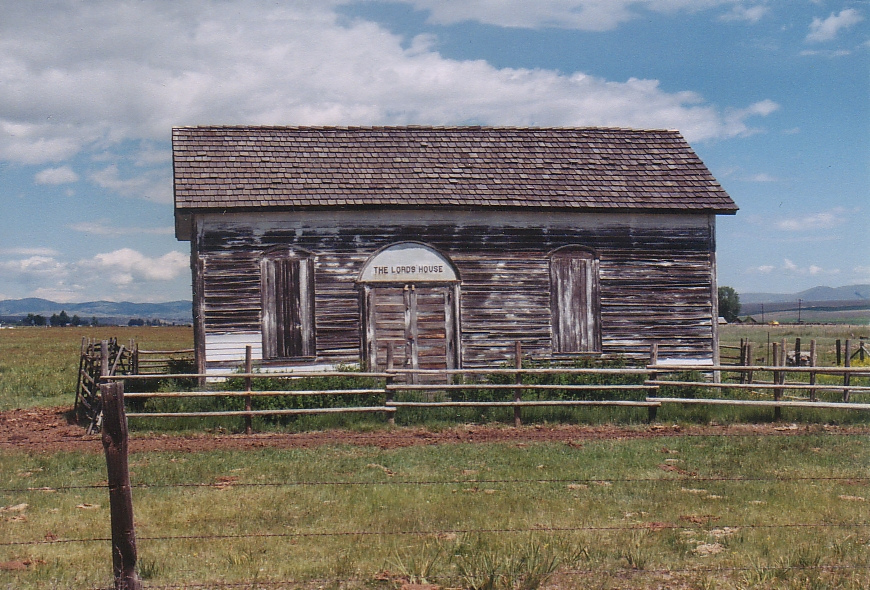
A Morrisite meetinghouse in Race Track, Powell County, Montana, with the inscription "The Lord's House"

Although seven Morrisites were convicted of murder and 66 others were convicted of resisting arrest, Territorial Governor Stephen S. Harding pardoned them all three days after being convicted, and the Morrisites scattered across the Western United States. Ultimately, many of the members of the church began to regather in Deer Lodge County, Montana, under the leadership of George Williams, who declared himself to be the "Prophet Cainan" and Morris's rightful successor. In January 1879, Williams prophesied that Deer Lodge County would be the site of the Second Coming of Christ.

Williams was frequently away from Montana, living mostly in Salt Lake City, Utah and England. Williams recorded many revelations that he said he received from God and also authored St. Ann's Hill Record, which he claimed was a record of ancient origin.

=== Schism and extinction ===
After Williams died in 1882, the church divided into a number of schisms, each claiming to be led by Williams's rightful successor. The largest group, based in Montana, was led by John R. Eardley, who renamed the church the Church of Jesus Christ of Saints of the Most High. By the 1950s, most of the members of the church had died, and it was officially disbanded in 1969.

== Teachings ==
Under the title The Spirit Prevails, a collection of Joseph Morris's "Revelations, Articles, and Letters" was published by George S. Dove & Company in 1886, twenty-four years after Morris's death. The revelations were recorded between 1857 and 1862 and were sacred scripture for Morris's followers.

Like most Latter Day Saint denominations, the Church of the Firstborn taught that Joseph Smith was a prophet of God. The church taught that Smith's rightful successor after he died was James Strang and that Strang was succeeded by Joseph Morris.

What set the Church of the Firstborn apart from the majority of Latter Day Saint sects was its belief in reincarnation. Called "baby resurrection" by the church, Morris and Williams taught that reincarnation was taught by Joseph Smith and that most other Latter Day Saint sects were in apostasy for rejecting those teachings. Each of the successive leaders of the church was believed to be the reincarnation of a significant prophet of old, with Joseph Smith being the reincarnation of Mormon and the Apostle Paul, Joseph Morris the reincarnation of Moses, and George Williams was the reincarnation of Cainan.

Morris prophesied that Jesus would be reincarnated and born to an Arab in Jerusalem in 1909, and some have identified Dr. Dahesh as the fulfilment of that prophecy.

The Church of the Firstborn rejected other teachings of Brigham Young and the LDS Church, including the temple ordinances. Morris wrote in 1861 that the biblical law of many wives was for this life only, "not being a celestial law," and that the kings and prophets who had many wives "can have but one sealed to them each for eternity." Kirk Watson notes that Morris did not authorize the practice among his followers, treating it as belonging to a future time.

== Leland Jensen ==
One of Williams' prophesies was that Deer Lodge, Montana, would be the site of the Second Coming of Christ. This prophecy was discovered by leaders of the small Baháʼí Faith apocalyptic cult founded by Leland Jensen and was considered a confirmation of Jensen's prophetic calling. Jensen taught that the Montana State Prison in Deer Lodge, where he had been incarcerated, was actually Ezekiel's Temple.

== See also ==
- James Brighouse
- William W. Davies
- Gudmund Gudmundson
