= Johan Benthin =

Artist from Denmark

Johan H. Benthin (1936–2006) was an artist from Denmark. He mostly did painting on canvas, but also did relief sculpture, murals, and other works. His work is in permanent collections in the Netherlands and the United States.

Benthin was a Latter-day Saint. Beginning in 1974, he was the first president on the Copenhagen Denmark Stake of the Church of Jesus Christ of Latter-day Saints (LDS Church). He was stake president in 1976 when LDS Church president Spencer W. Kimball toured the Church of Our Lady; it was to Benthin that Kimball gave the instruction, "I want you to tell every prelate in Denmark that they do not hold the keys. I HOLD THE KEYS."

Benthin opened a studio in Italy in 1964. For most of the 1970s and 1980s he worked primarily in Germany. He then moved to Spain. He also for a time lived in India, where he served as president of the LDS Church district based in Bangalore.

== See also ==
- The Church of Jesus Christ of Latter-day Saints in Denmark
