= John W. Dawson =

3rd Territorial Governor of Utah

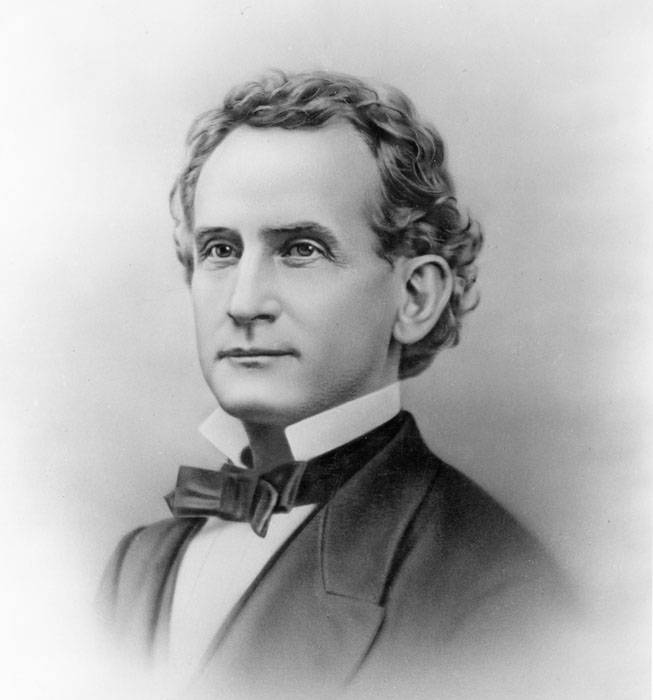

3rd Governor of Utah Territory
- In office October 3, 1861 – December 31, 1861
- Appointed by: Abraham Lincoln
- Preceded by: Alfred Cumming
- Succeeded by: Stephen S. Harding

Personal details
- Born: October 21, 1820 Cambridge, Indiana, United States
- Died: September 10, 1877 (aged 56)
- Resting place: Lindenwood Cemetery, Fort Wayne, Indiana
- Party: Republican
- Other political affiliations: Originally Democrat

John W. Dawson (October 21, 1820 – September 10, 1877) was Governor of Utah Territory in 1861.

Born on October 21, 1820, in the pioneer settlement of Cambridge in Dearborn County, Indiana, he was a lawyer, a farmer and a newspaper editor before he entered politics. He was appointed governor of Utah Territory.

== Newspaper career ==
Dawson, along with T.N. Hood, leased George W. Wood's interest in the Fort Wayne Times and People's Press for one year, starting on September 7, 1853. They changed the name to the Fort Wayne Times and continued to publish until Hood sold his interest to Dawson and Wood. Wood retired in 1854, leaving Dawson in charge of the paper. In 1854, the Times had a decidedly Anti-Nebraska sentiment while Thomas Tigar's Fort Wayne Sentinel had the opposite attitude. Dawson's political issues included being anti-abolition, temperance, free public schools, and various Know-nothing/Fusion Party/People's Party issues. The paper continued in various forms until 1865, when Dawson sold the paper to Henry Dills and Isaac W. Campbell. In 1866, the paper merged with the Fort Wayne Sentinel.

== Political career ==
Dawson ran unsuccessfully for a seat in the Indiana House of Representatives in 1854, Secretary of State of Indiana in 1856, and United States Congress in 1858. He started as a Democrat, but later became a Republican.

== Utah Governor ==
Abraham Lincoln named him governor of Utah Territory in 1861, but he left the territory and his post as governor after only three weeks due to tensions with the Mormon residents. Dawson wrote to Abraham Lincoln that after vetoing a proposition to create the state of State of Deseret, the Deseret News had published "an article so full of misrepresentation calumny & unjustifiable invective" that he had decided to flee the state.

Taking a mail coach eastward, he arrived at Ephraim Hanks' Pony Express station at Mountain Dell, Utah. There, Hanks assured Dawson he was now safe. However a group of young Mormon vigilantes named Jason Luce, Martin "Matt" Luce, Wilford Luce, Wood Reynolds, Moroni Clawson, Lot Hungtington, and Isaac Neibaur followed the retreating governor, and during a night of drinking, they plundered the governor's baggage, and attacked him, beating and kicking Dawson about the head, chest, and groin (and allegedly castrating one of his testicles). The thugs later claimed they were acting under direct orders of the Salt Lake Police Chief. Four of the youths were captured but the other three were gunned down trying to escape from police and sheriffs.

== Later career ==
Dawson later became famous as the first biographer of John Chapman, the legendary Johnny Appleseed. Dawson's 1871 article in the Fort Wayne News Sentinel of October 21 and 23 about Dawson's childhood friend is still considered the main source for biographical information on Chapman.

He died on September 10, 1877, and was interred at Lindenwood Cemetery in Fort Wayne, Indiana.

== See also ==
- Runaway Officials of 1851 - previous Utah Territory office holders who also literally ran away from their official duties.

== Notes ==
Political offices
Preceded by Alfred Cumming	Governor of Utah Territory; 1861	Succeeded by Stephen S. Harding
