= Knappa, Oregon =

Unincorporated community in the state of Oregon, United States

- Census-designated place
- Motto: Amazing Place
- Location within the state of Oregon
- Coordinates: 46°10′10″N 123°34′56″W
- Country: United States
- State: Oregon
- County: Clatsop

Area
  - Total: 2.11 sq mi (5.46 km^{2})
  - Land: 2.07 sq mi (5.35 km^{2})
  - Water: 0.042 sq mi (0.11 km^{2})
- Elevation: 121 ft (37 m)

Population (2020)
  - Total: 1,007
  - Density: 487.4/sq mi (188.19/km^{2})
- Time zone: UTC-8 (Pacific (PST))
  - Summer (DST): UTC-7 (PDT)
- ZIP code: 97103
- Area codes: 503 and 971
- FIPS code: 41-39850
- GNIS feature ID: 2812875

Knappa is an unincorporated community and census-designated place located on the south bank of the Columbia River in Clatsop County, Oregon, United States, approximately 12 miles (19 km) directly east of Astoria. Knappa faces the Columbia River, where several islands comprise the Lewis and Clark National Wildlife Refuge. As of the 2020 census, Knappa had a population of 1,007.

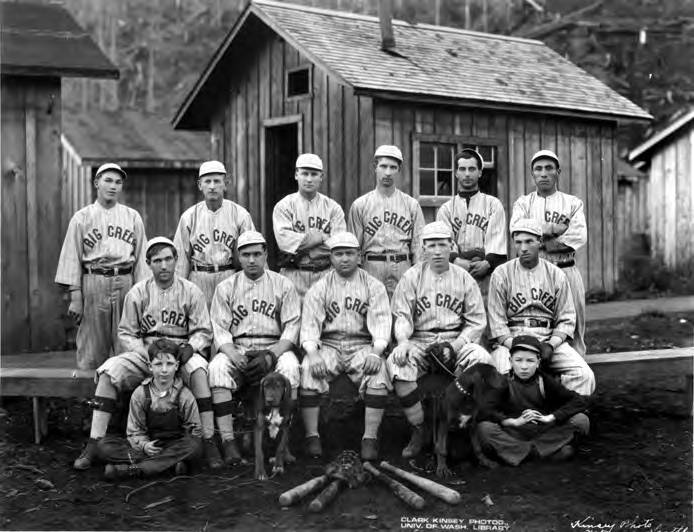
Big Creek baseball team, Big Creek Logging Company, Knappa, c. 1918

The community is named after Aaron Knapp Jr., an early settler. There was a post office in Knappa from 1872 to 1943.

Logging and fishing are the primary economic activities in Knappa.

== Education ==
It is in the Knappa School District 4. Knappa School District comprises Hilda Lahti Elementary School and Knappa High School.

Clatsop County is in the boundary of Clatsop Community College.

== Demographics ==
Historical population
Census	Pop.	Note	%±
2020	1,007		—
U.S. Decennial Census
