= Stephen S. Harding =

American judge

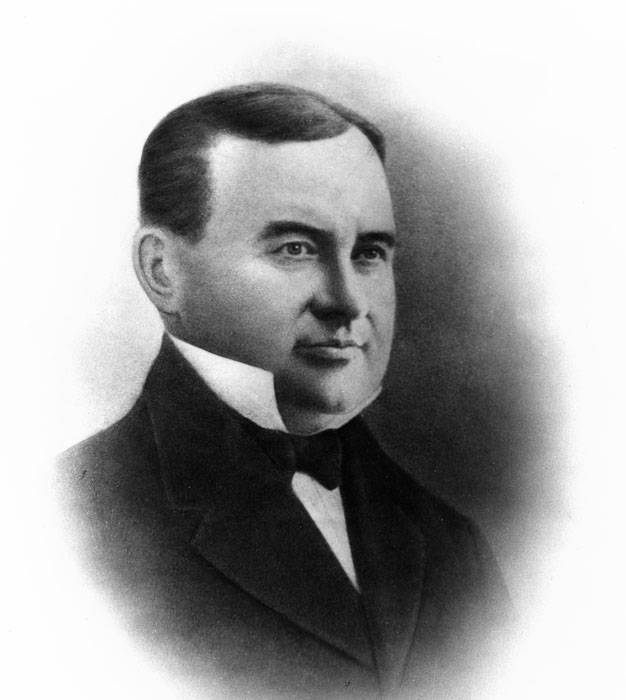

4th Governor of Utah Territory
- In office March 31, 1862 – June 2, 1863
- Appointed by: Abraham Lincoln
- Preceded by: John W. Dawson
- Succeeded by: James Duane Doty

Personal details
- Born: February 24, 1808 Palmyra, New York, U.S.
- Died: February 12, 1891 (aged 82) Milan, Indiana, U.S.
- Profession: Politician, attorney

Stephen Selwyn Harding (February 24, 1808 – February 12, 1891) was an American politician, lawyer, anti-slavery leader and ardent abolitionist in Indiana who served as governor of the Utah Territory (1862–1863) and as chief justice of the Colorado Supreme Court (1863–1865). Because Harding proved to be unpopular with the territory's Mormon leaders and citizens, he remained at Salt Lake City for less than a year before President Abraham Lincoln appointed him to the judgeship at Denver. In 1865 Harding returned to Indiana, where he practiced law until his retirement in 1881. Earlier in his political career, Harding helped organize the Liberty Party in Indiana and was the party's candidate for lieutenant governor of Indiana in 1843 and 1846, but lost both races. Harding subsequently became a member of the Free Soil Party in 1848 and was an early member of the Republican Party in Indiana in the 1850s.

== Early years and education ==
Stephen Selwyn Harding, the eldest son of David E. and Abigail Harding, was born in Palmyra, New York, on February 24, 1808. In 1820, the Harding family moved to Ripley County, Indiana, which was a frontier wilderness at that time. Although Stephen had only about nine months of formal school training, he was an avid reader.

Harding studied law in the office of William R. Morris in Brookville, Indiana, and became licensed to practice law on March 17, 1828, at the age of twenty.

== Career ==
=== Early years ===
Harding opened a law office in Richmond, Indiana, but he remained there for only six months. As a young and inexperienced lawyer, as well as a newcomer to Richmond, he faced stiff competition from several prominent lawyers in the area that included U.S. Senator James Noble (who later became governor of Indiana) and Oliver H. Smith (who later became a U.S. Senator from Indiana). Harding spent idle time at his law office studying Roman and Greek classics, as well as William Shakespeare's works.

In the fall of 1828, Harding took a steamboat from Louisville, Kentucky, to New Orleans, Louisiana, partly to claim personal property of behalf of a client, but also to consider opportunities to establish a law practice in the South. Unable to find employment as a lawyer, he returned to Indiana in the spring of 1829, working his way back home as a clerk on the steamboat Belvedere along the Mississippi River. Harding became an abolitionist as a result of his eight-month trip to the South, where he witnessed first-hand the effects of the slave trade and the slave markets at New Orleans.

=== Early Mormon connection ===
Shortly after his return to Indiana in 1829, Harding left for an extended trip to the East, where he spent the summer in Palmyra, New York. During his visit, Harding was an overnight guest at the home of Joseph Smith Sr. who was the father of Joseph Smith Jr., the founder of Mormonism, a religious movement of which the Church of Jesus Christ of Latter-day Saints (LDS Church) is the largest denomination. Harding also met with several early Mormon leaders including Martin Harris and Oliver Cowdery. About twenty years after his service as the governor of the Utah Territory, the aging Harding wrote a letter in 1882 that is quoted in The Prophet of Palmyra, an anti-Mormon book, describing his recollection that as a boy, he had seen young Smith Jr. fishing in the same Palmyra mill pond that he has also frequented in his youth. Harding also reported that Martin Harris occasionally visited his parents when the Harding family was living near Palmyra before their migration to Indiana. In addition, nearly sixty years earlier, in 1829, he and Harris listened as Cowdery read from a few of the yet unpublished manuscripts of the Book of Mormon in the candlelight of Joseph Smith Sr.'s log home. Harding also recalled that he had been given the first sheet of the freshly-printed Book of Mormon title page, which he gave to a saint named Robert Campbell, who later donated it to the LDS Church at Salt Lake City. During his visit to Palmyra, Mormon leaders also asked Harding to become a Mormon missionary in London, England, but he declined the request and returned to Indiana in late 1829.

=== Indiana lawyer and abolitionist ===
Harding opened a law practice in Versailles, Indiana, in December 1829, and by 1830, was an active abolitionist. He began delivering anti-slavery speeches at gatherings near his home in southeast Indiana, which included active pro-slavery and anti-slavery factions. In the 1830s and 1840s, Harding's interest in the anti-slavery issue continued to increase and as he became a leader in the abolition movement in Indiana. Harding, who believed that slavery was unconstitutional, had anti-slavery views similar to other moderate abolitionists such as Salmon P. Chase, William Jay, Joshua Reed Giddings, and James G. Birney; unlike those of radical abolitionists like William Lloyd Garrison. Indiana historian Jacob Piatt Dunn Jr. reports that the Harding home in Milan, Indiana, was used as a station on the Underground Railroad.

Even though his views on slavery were not popular in some of the areas where he spoke in Indiana, Harding continued to deliver anti-slavery speeches. Harding, a subscriber to several anti-slavery journals, was well-informed on the issue. In 1844, he predicted in a speech he gave at Versailles, Indiana, that twenty years later slavery would not exist in the United States.

=== Indiana politician ===
Harding, a member of the Whig Party, left the party in 1840 to join the Liberty Party. He was nominated as the Liberty Party's candidate for lieutenant governor of Indiana in 1842 and 1846, but lost both races. In 1844, Harding served as a presidential elector of the Liberty Party's candidate, James G. Birney. After the Liberty Party had dissolved by 1848, Harding joined the Free Soil Party. In July 1848, while Harding attended the national Free-Soil convention in Buffalo, New York, the Free-Soil Party of Indiana was established at Indianapolis. Harding was among the speakers at the Free-Soil Party's second state convention in Indianapolis. Representing the 4th Congressional District, Harding was also one of eleven presidential electors on the Free-Soil ticket in 1852.

In 1854, Harding aligned himself with the People's Party, the predecessor to the Republican Party in Indiana, and was among the leaders who addressed a People's Party meeting on July 12, 1854, the day before the party was officially organized in the state. Harding joined the Republican Party because of its platform, which opposed polygamy, as well as the expansion of slavery. Harding promoted the Republican Party's platform in Indiana, and in 1860 became one of sixteen members of the Indiana Republican Party's state central committee.

=== Governor of Utah Territory (1862–63) ===
At the recommendation of Indiana politicians Schuyler Colfax and George Washington Julian, Abraham Lincoln appointed Harding governor of the Utah Territory in 1862. The U.S. Senate confirmed the appointment without a dissenting vote on March 31, 1862. Harding began his overland journey west in May and arrived at Salt Lake City to assume his new duties on July 7, 1862.

His tenure at the territorial governor was marked by conflicts with Mormon politicians, especially with Brigham Young, the former territorial governor and head of the LDS Church, and the territory's Mormon residents. Harding was unable to enforce federal law in the territory due to the conflicts with the Mormons. Soon after he took office he issued a blanket pardon for all Morrisites convicted in connection with the Morrisite War. He also initially tried to appease the Mormon community but soon became critical of church leaders and the practice of plural marriage (polygamy). In his first message to the territorial legislature In December 1862, Harding defended an anti-polygamy act recently passed in the U.S. Congress and described his intention to challenge Mormon dominance in Utah. Harding's relations with the Mormons further declined after he approved of efforts to limit the jurisdiction of the Mormon-controlled probate courts and to transfer control of the militia to the territorial governor.

In March 1863, after a mass meeting was held in Salt Lake City to discuss the issue, territorial citizens petitioned President Lincoln to remove Harding from office, but instead of recalling him, Lincoln appointed Harding to the post of U.S. consul at Valparaíso, Chile. Harding resigned the position as territorial governor in fall of 1863, intending to accept the diplomatic post, but due to his wife's ill health and other domestic reasons, he had to resign the appointment on the eve of his departure to Chile.

=== Chief Justice of Colorado (1863–1865) ===
Lincoln appointed Harding to serve as Chief Justice of the Colorado Territory's Supreme Court in July 1863, and remained in that position until May 1865. One of his responsibilities as Chief Justice was to serve as a committee member responsible for certifying the results of ballots cast in 1865 to request that Colorado be admitted as a state in the Union. Believing that the results had been altered in favor of statehood, Harding refused to approve the results.

=== Later years ===
Harding left Colorado in 1865 and resumed his private law practice in Indiana. He retired from practicing law in 1881 due to blindness.

== Personal life ==
Stephen Harding married Avoline Sprout of Chautauqua County, New York, on October 31, 1830. They were the parents of nine children (five sons and four daughters).

Harding died on February 12, 1891, at Milan in Ripley County, Indiana, and was buried in the Greendale Cemetery at Greendale, Indiana.

== Notes ==
Political offices
Preceded by John W. Dawson	Governor of Utah Territory; 1862–1863	Succeeded by James Duane Doty
