= Utah War =

Armed conflict in the Utah Territory in 1857–1858

- Part of the Mormon wars
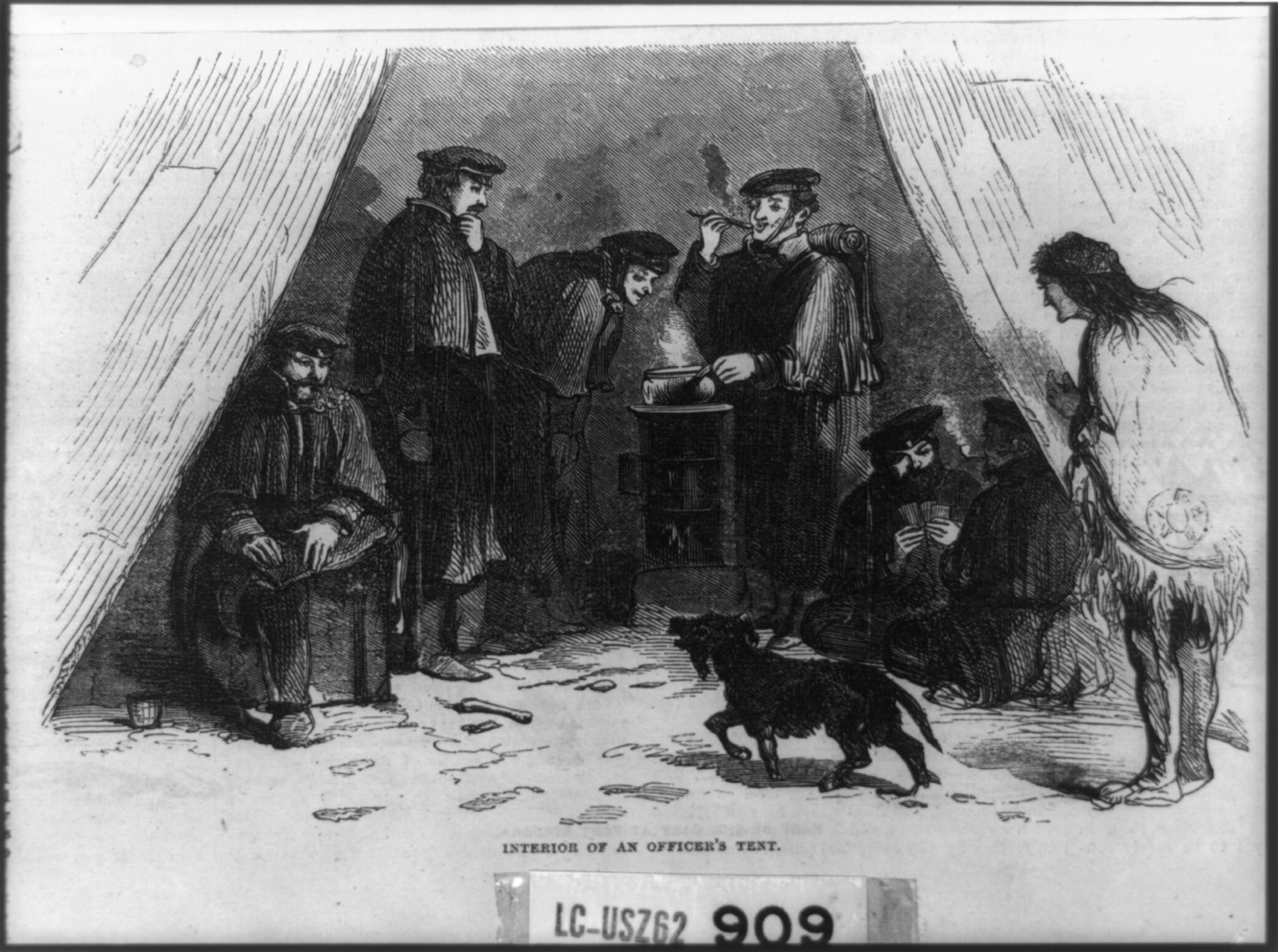
- American officers during the Utah War
| Date | 29 June 1857–12 April 1858 |
| Location | Utah Territory (present day Utah and Wyoming) |
| Result | Inconclusive; Utah War Peace Commission: Brigham Young replaced as Governor of Utah Territory; Full amnesty for charges of sedition and treason issued to the citizens of Utah Territory by President James Buchanan if they accepted US federal authority; U.S. territorial integrity preserved |

Belligerents
| United States | Deseret / Utah; Indigenous allies |

Commanders and leaders
| (United States) President James Buchanan; Governor Alfred Cumming; General Albert S. Johnston | Gov. Brigham Young; Gen. Daniel H. Wells; Cap. Lot Smith |

Units involved
| United States Army: 5th Infantry; 10th Infantry; B Battery (Phelps') of the 4th Artillery; 2nd Dragoons | Nauvoo Legion; Armed Mormons |

Strength
| 2,500–3,000 | 15,000 |

Casualties and losses
- Civilians: 150 killed (120 in tangentially related Mountain Meadows Massacre)

The Utah War (1857–1858), also known as the Utah Expedition, the Utah Campaign, Buchanan's Blunder, the Mormon War, or the Mormon Rebellion, was an armed confrontation between the armed forces of the US government and the Mormon settlers in the Utah Territory. The confrontation lasted from May 1857 to July 1858. The conflict primarily involved Mormon settlers and federal troops, escalating from tensions over governance and autonomy within the territory. There were several casualties, predominantly non-Mormon civilians. Although the war featured no significant military battles, it included the Mountain Meadows Massacre, where Mormon militia members disarmed and murdered about 120 settlers traveling to California with tensions from the Utah War being cited as a contributing factor to the massacre.

The resolution of the Utah War came through negotiations that permitted federal troops to enter Utah Territory in exchange for a pardon granted to the Mormon settlers for any potential acts of rebellion. This settlement significantly reduced the tensions and allowed for the re-establishment of federal authority over the territory while largely preserving Mormon interests and autonomy. At the same time the conflict was widely seen as a disaster for President Buchanan, who many felt botched the situation, and it became known as "Buchanan's Blunder" in later years. Many believe the war along with Buchanan's failings contributed to the rising tensions that would lead to the Civil War in 1861.

== Overview ==
In 1857–1858, President James Buchanan sent U.S. forces to the Utah Territory in what became known as the Utah Expedition. Members of the Church of Jesus Christ of Latter-day Saints (LDS Church), also known as Mormons or Latter-day Saints, fearful that the large U.S. military force had been sent to annihilate them and having faced persecution in other areas, made preparations for defense. Though bloodshed was to be avoided, and the U.S. government also hoped that its purpose might be attained without the loss of life, both sides prepared for war. The Mormons manufactured or repaired firearms, prepared war scythes, and burnished and sharpened long-unused sabers.

Rather than engaging the Army directly, the Mormon strategy was one of hindering and weakening them. Daniel H. Wells, Lieutenant-General of the Nauvoo Legion, instructed Major Joseph Taylor:

On ascertaining the locality or route of the troops, proceed at once to annoy them in every possible way. Use every exertion to stampede their animals and set fire to their trains. Burn the whole country before them and on their flanks. Keep them from sleeping by night surprises; blockade the road by felling trees or destroying the river fords where you can. Watch for opportunities to set fire to the grass on their windward so as, if possible, to envelop their trains. Leave no grass before them that can be burned. Keep your men concealed as much as possible, and guard against surprise.

The Mormons blocked the army's entrance into the Salt Lake Valley, and weakened the U.S. Army by hindering their receiving of provisions.

The confrontation between the Mormon militia, called the Nauvoo Legion, and the U.S. Army involved some destruction of property and a few brief skirmishes in what is today southwestern Wyoming, but no battles occurred between the contending military forces.

At the height of the tensions, on September 11, 1857, at least 120 California-bound settlers from Arkansas, Missouri and other states, including unarmed men, women, and children, were killed in remote southwestern Utah by a group of local Mormon militia. The Mormon militia responsible for the massacre first claimed that the migrants were killed by Natives but it was proven otherwise. This event was later called the Mountain Meadows Massacre, and the motives behind the incident remain unclear.

The Aiken Massacre took place the following month. In October 1857, Mormons arrested six Californians traveling through Utah and charged them with being spies for the U.S. Army. They were released but were later murdered and robbed of their stock and $25,000.

Other incidents of violence have also been linked to the Utah War, including a Native American attack on the Mormon mission of Fort Lemhi in eastern Oregon Territory, modern-day Idaho. They killed two Mormons and wounded several others. Mormon historian Brigham Madsen notes, "[T]he responsibility for the [Fort Limhi raid] lay mainly with the Bannock." David Bigler concludes that the raid was probably caused by members of the Utah Expedition who were trying to replenish their stores of livestock that had been stolen by Mormon raiders.

Taking all incidents into account, William MacKinnon estimated that approximately 150 people died as a direct result of the year-long Utah War, including the 120 migrants killed at Mountain Meadows. He points out that this was close to the number of people killed during the seven-year contemporaneous struggle in "Bleeding Kansas".

In the end, negotiations between the United States and the Latter-day Saints resulted in a full pardon for the Latter-day Saints (except those involved in the Mountain Meadows murders), the transfer of Utah's governorship from church president Brigham Young to non-Mormon Alfred Cumming, and the peaceful entrance of the U.S. Army into Utah.

== Background ==
=== Exodus to the Utah Territory ===
The Utah Territory (in blue) and proposed State of Deseret (dotted line). Modern map underlaid for reference.

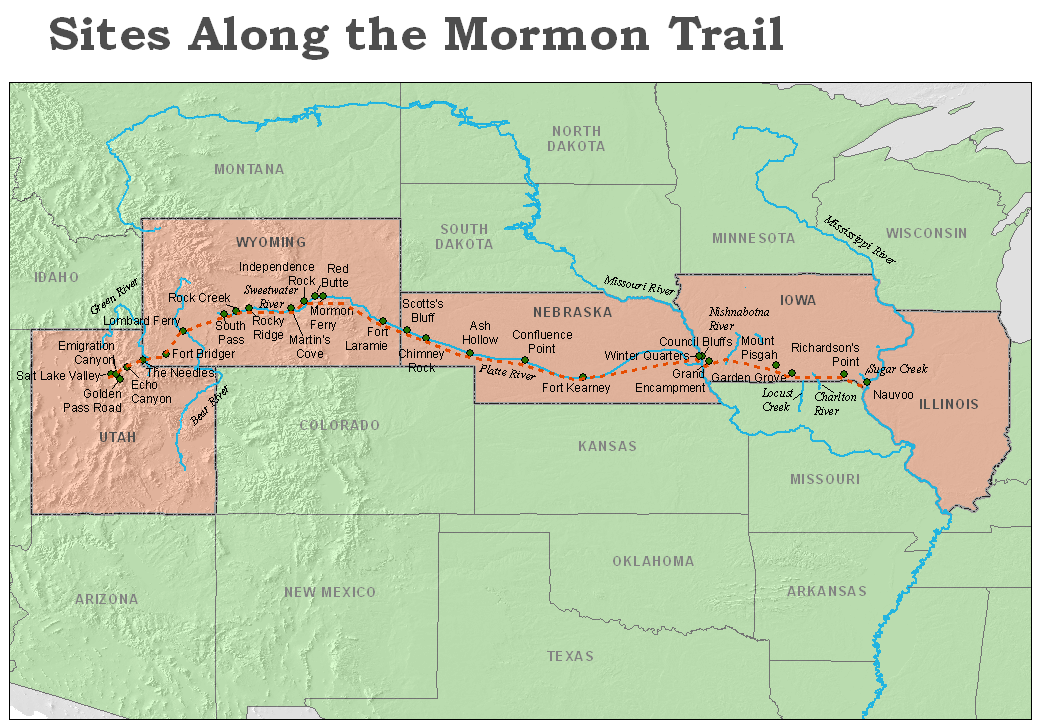
The Mormon Trail from Illinois to Great Salt Lake City.

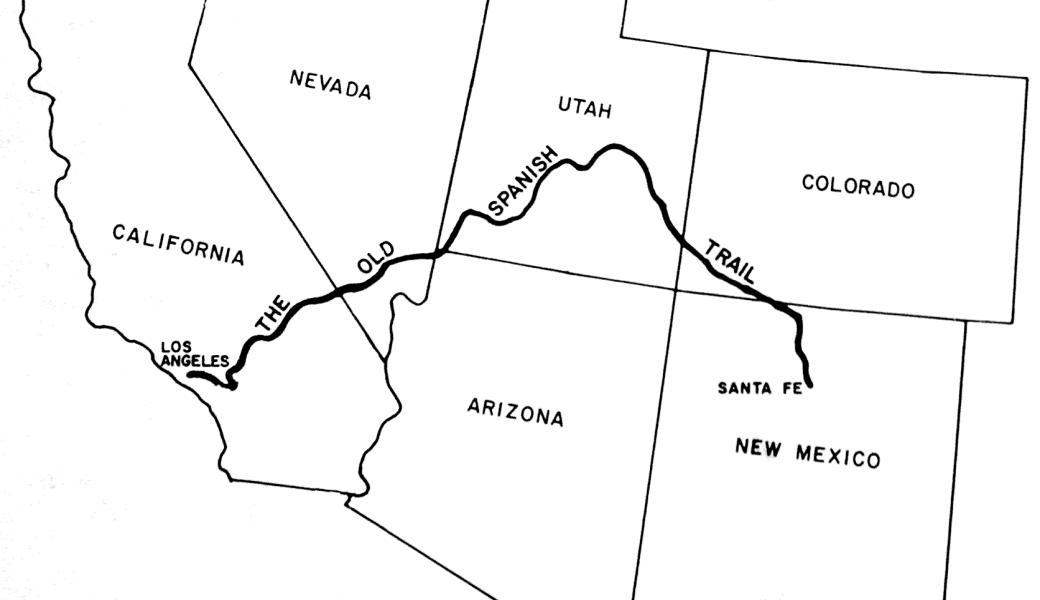
The Old Spanish Trail, the southern route into California.

Mormons began settling in what is now Utah (then part of Alta California in the Centralist Republic of Mexico) in the summer of 1847. Mormon pioneers began leaving the United States for Utah after a series of severe conflicts with neighboring communities in Missouri and Illinois resulted, in 1844, in the death of Joseph Smith, founder of the Latter Day Saint movement.

Brigham Young and other LDS Church leaders believed that the isolation of Utah would secure the rights of Mormons and would ensure the free practice of their religion. Although the United States had gained control of the settled parts of Alta California and Nuevo México in 1846 in the early stages of the Mexican–American War, legal transfer of the Mexican Cession to the U.S. came only with the Treaty of Guadalupe Hidalgo ending the war in 1848. LDS Church leaders understood that they were not "leaving the political orbit of the United States", nor did they want to. When gold was discovered in California in 1848 at Sutter's Mill, which sparked the famous California Gold Rush, thousands of migrants began moving west on trails that passed directly through territory settled by Mormon pioneers. Although the migrants brought opportunities for trade, they also ended the Mormons' short-lived isolation.

In 1849, the Mormons proposed that a large part of the territory that they inhabited be incorporated into the United States as the State of Deseret. Their primary concern was to be governed by men of their own choosing rather than "unsympathetic carpetbag appointees", who they believed would be sent from Washington, D.C. if their region were given territorial status, as was customary. They believed that only through a state run by church leadership could they maintain their religious freedom. The U.S. Congress created the Utah Territory as part of the Compromise of 1850. President Millard Fillmore selected Brigham Young, the LDS Church's president, as the first governor of the Territory. The Mormons were pleased by the appointment, but gradually the amicable relationship between Mormons and the federal government broke down.

=== Polygamy, popular sovereignty, and slavery ===
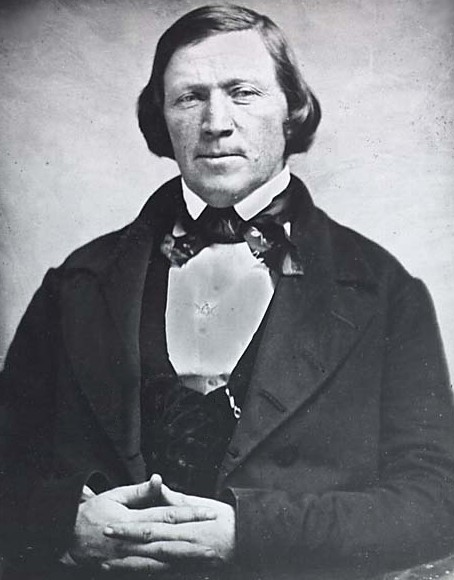
Governor Brigham Young was appointed to office by President Millard Fillmore in 1850.

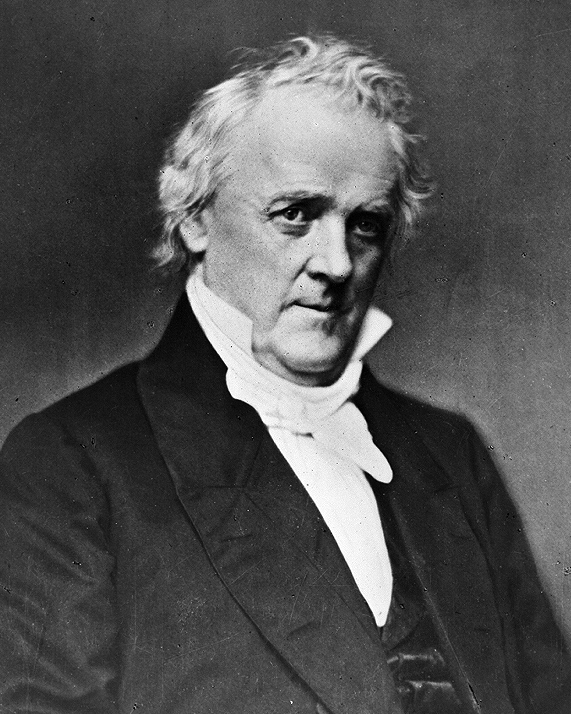
President James Buchanan was inaugurated in March 1857. The Presidential campaign of 1856 featured extensive denunciation of polygamy and Mormon governance in Utah.

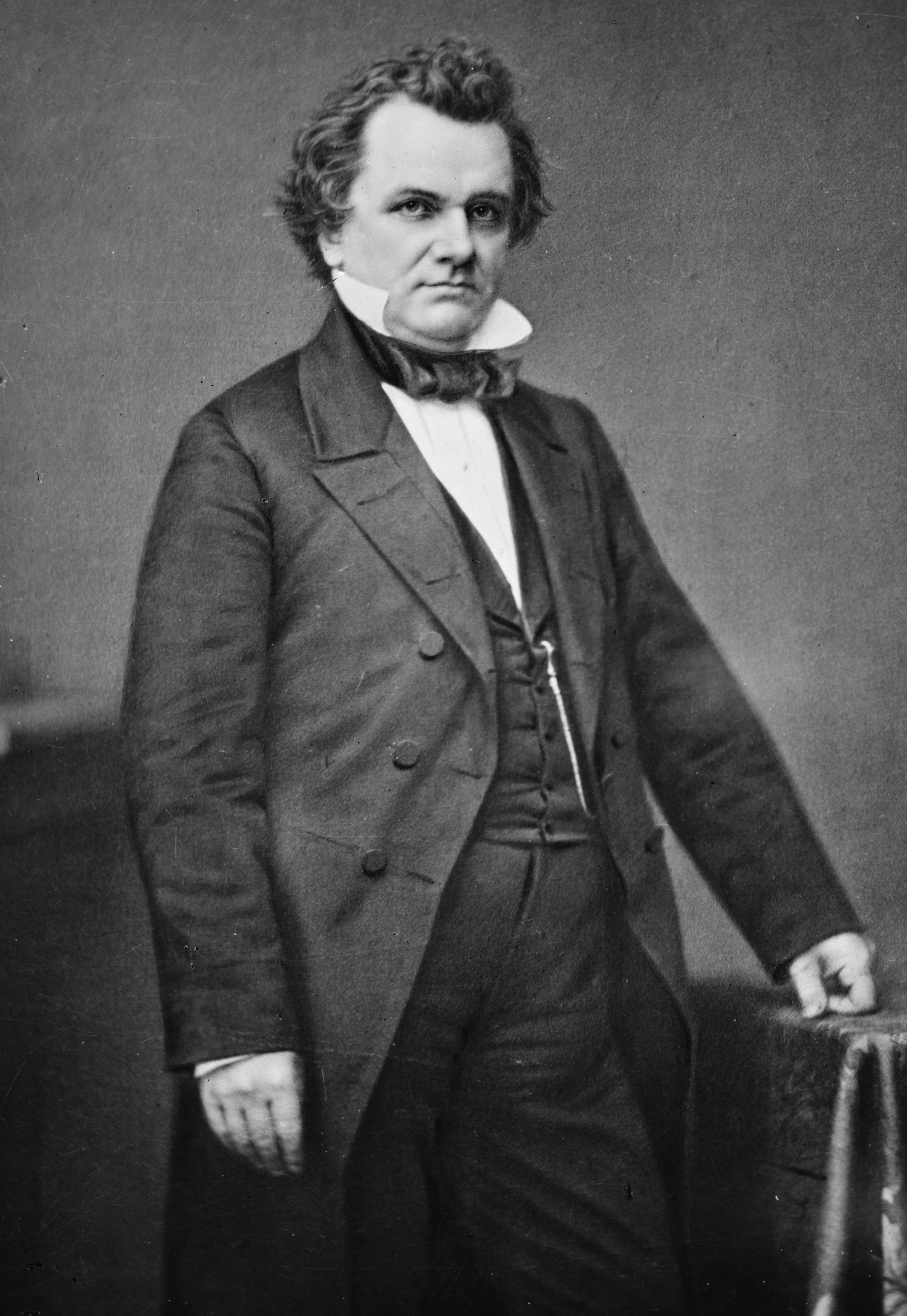
Senator Stephen A. Douglas was a leading proponent of popular sovereignty.

During this period, the leadership of the LDS Church supported polygamy, which Mormons called "plural marriage". An estimated 20% to 25% of Latter-day Saints were members of polygamous households, with the practice involving approximately one-third of Mormon women who reached marriageable age. The Mormons in territorial Utah viewed plural marriage as religious doctrine until 1890, when it was removed as an official practice of the church by Wilford Woodruff.

However, the rest of American society rejected polygamy, and some commentators accused the Mormons of gross immorality. During the Presidential election of 1856 a key plank of the newly formed Republican Party's platform was a pledge "to prohibit in the territories those twin relics of barbarism: polygamy and slavery". The Republicans associated the Democratic principle of popular sovereignty with the party's acceptance of polygamy in Utah and turned this accusation into a formidable political weapon.

Popular sovereignty was the theoretical basis of the Compromise of 1850 and the Kansas–Nebraska Act of 1854. This concept was meant to remove the divisive issue of slavery in the Territories from the national debate, allowing local decision-making and forestalling armed conflict between the North and South. But during the campaign, the Republican Party denounced the theory as protecting polygamy. Such leading Democrats as Stephen A. Douglas, formerly an ally of the Latter-day Saints, began to denounce Mormonism in order to save the concept of popular sovereignty for issues related to slavery. The Democrats believed that American attitudes toward polygamy had the potential of derailing the compromise on slavery. For the Democrats, attacks on Mormonism had the dual purpose of disentangling polygamy from popular sovereignty and distracting the nation from the ongoing battles over slavery.

In March 1852, the Utah Territory passed Acts that legalized black slavery and Indian slavery.

=== Theodemocracy ===
Many east-coast politicians, such as U.S. President James Buchanan, were alarmed by the semi-theocratic dominance of the Utah Territory under Brigham Young. Young had been appointed territorial Governor by Millard Fillmore.

In addition to popular election, many early LDS Church leaders received quasi-political administrative appointments at both the territorial and federal level that coincided with their ecclesiastical roles, including the powerful probate judges. In analogy to the federal procedure, these executive and judicial appointments were confirmed by the Territorial Legislature, which largely consisted of popularly elected Latter-day Saints. Additionally, LDS Church leaders counseled Latter-day Saints to use ecclesiastical arbitration to resolve disputes among church members before resorting to the more explicit legal system. Both President Buchanan and the U.S. Congress saw these acts as obstructing, if not subverting, the operation of legitimate institutions of the United States.

Numerous newspaper articles continued sensationalizing Mormon beliefs and exaggerated earlier accounts of conflicts with frontier settlers. These stories led many Americans to believe that Mormon leaders were petty tyrants and that Mormons were determined to create a Zionist, polygamous kingdom in the newly acquired territories.

Many felt that these sensationalized beliefs, along with early communitarian practices of the United Order, also violated the principles of republicanism as well as the philosophy of laissez-faire economics. James Strang, a rival to Brigham Young who also claimed succession to the leadership of the church after Joseph Smith's death, elevated these fears by proclaiming himself a king and resettling his followers on Beaver Island in Lake Michigan, after the main body of the LDS Church had fled to Utah.

People also believed that Brigham Young maintained power through a paramilitary organization called the Danites. The Danites were formed by a group of Mormons in Missouri in 1838. Most scholars believe that following the end of the Mormon War in the winter of 1838, the unit was partially disbanded. Some believe that Mormon culture was inherently violent but and others conclude that Utah Territory was less violent than other contemporaneous societies. These factors contributed to the popular belief that Mormons "were oppressed by a religious tyranny and kept in submission only by some terroristic arm of the Church ... [However] no Danite band could have restrained the flight of freedom-loving men from a Territory possessed of many exits; yet a flood of emigrants poured into Utah each year, with only a trickle ... ebbing back."

=== Federal appointees ===
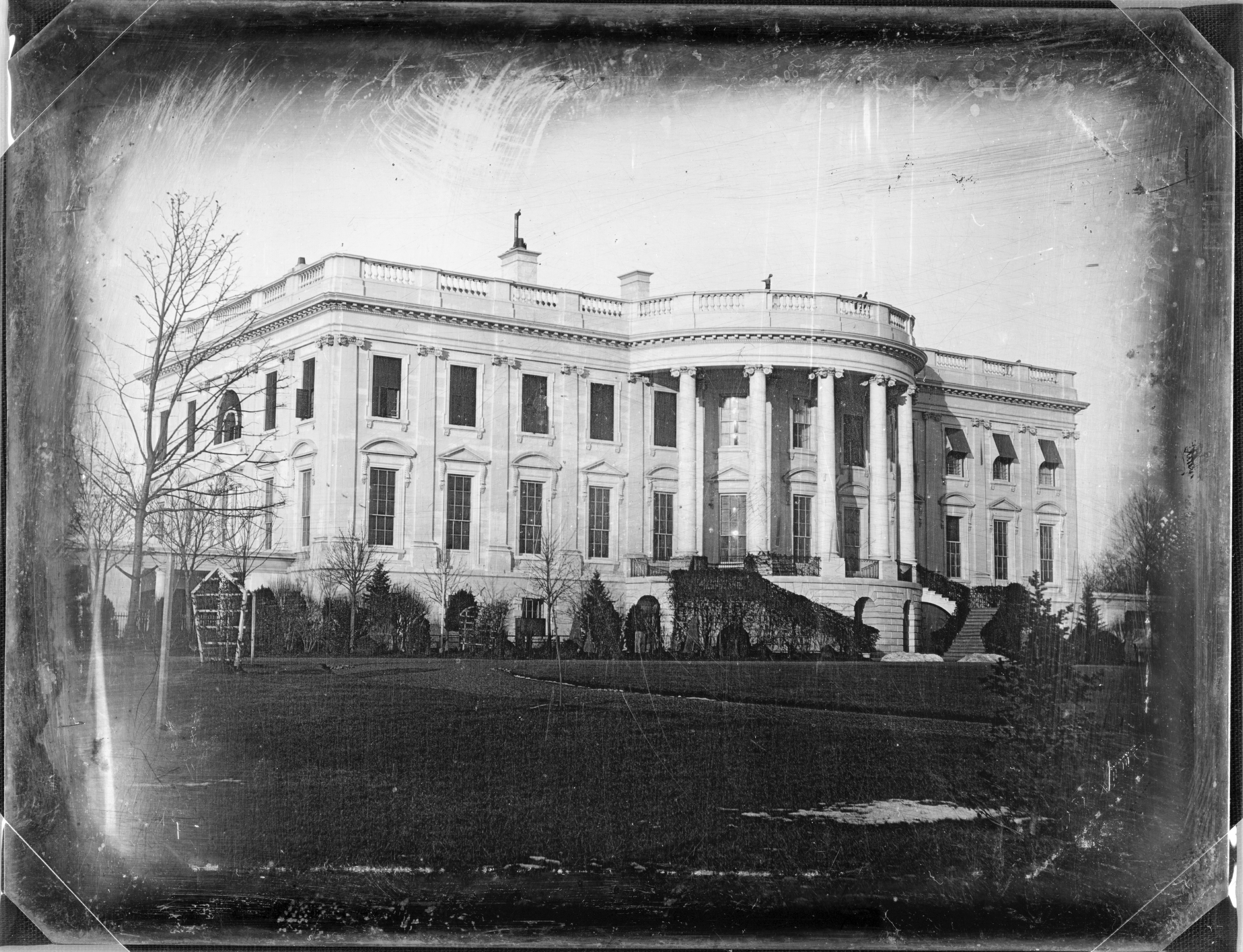
The White House in 1846. The federal government maintained significant control over territories such as Utah, and the President chose federal officers for the territories with the advice and consent of the Senate. The appointments did not require the approval of the territory's inhabitants.

These circumstances were not helped by the relationship between "Gentile" (non-Mormon) federal appointees and the Mormon territorial leadership. The territory's Organic Act held that the governor, federal judges, and other important territorial positions were to be filled by appointees chosen by the President with the advice and consent of the Senate, but without any reference to the will of Utah's population—as was standard for all territorial administration.

Some federal officials sent by the President maintained essentially harmonious relationships with the Mormons. For instance, from 1853 to 1855, the territorial supreme court was composed of two non-Mormons and one Mormon. However, both of these non-Mormons were well respected in the Latter-day Saint community and were genuinely mourned for their deaths. Others had severe difficulties adjusting to the Mormon-dominated territorial government and the unique Mormon culture. Historian Norman Furniss writes that although some of these appointees were basically honest and well-meaning, many were highly prejudiced against the Mormons even before they arrived in the territory and woefully unqualified for their positions, while a few were down-right reprobates.

On the other hand, the Mormons had no patience for the federal domination entailed by territorial status and often showed defiance toward the representatives of the federal government. In addition, the Saints sincerely declared their loyalty to the United States and celebrated the Fourth of July every year with unabashed patriotism, but they were undisguisedly critical of the federal government, which they felt had driven them out from their homes in the east. Like the contemporary abolitionists, Latter-day Saint leaders declared that the judgments of God would be meted out upon the nation for its unrighteousness. Brigham Young echoed the opinion of many Latter-day Saints when he declared "I love the government and the Constitution of the United States, but I do not love the damned rascals that administer the government."

The Mormons also maintained a governmental and legal regime in "Zion", which they believed was perfectly permissible under the Constitution, but which was fundamentally different from that espoused in the rest of the country.

The Latter-day Saints and federal appointees in the Territory faced continual dispute. These conflicts regarded relations with the Indians (who often differentiated between "Americans" and "Mormons"), acceptance of the common law, the criminal jurisdiction of probate courts, the Mormon use of ecclesiastical courts rather than the federal court system for civil matters, the legitimacy of land titles, water rights, and various other issues. Many of the federal officers were also appalled by the practice of polygamy and the Mormon belief system in general and would harangue the Mormons for their "lack of morality" in public addresses. This already tense situation was further exacerbated by a period of intense religious revival starting in late 1856 dubbed the "Mormon Reformation".

Beginning in 1851, a number of federal officers, some claiming that they feared for their physical safety, left their Utah appointments for the east. The stories of these "Runaway Officials" convinced the new President that the Mormons were nearing a state of rebellion against the authority of the United States. According to LDS historians James B. Allen and Glen M. Leonard, the most influential information came from William W. Drummond, an associate justice of the Utah territorial supreme court who began serving in 1854. Drummond's letter of resignation of March 30, 1857, contained charges that Young's power set aside the rule of law in the territory, that the Mormons had ignored the laws of Congress and the Constitution, and that male Mormons acknowledged no law but the priesthood.

He further charged the Church with murder, destruction of federal court records, harassment of federal officers, and slandering the federal government. He concluded by urging the president to appoint a governor who was not a member of the Church and to send with him sufficient military aid to enforce his rule.

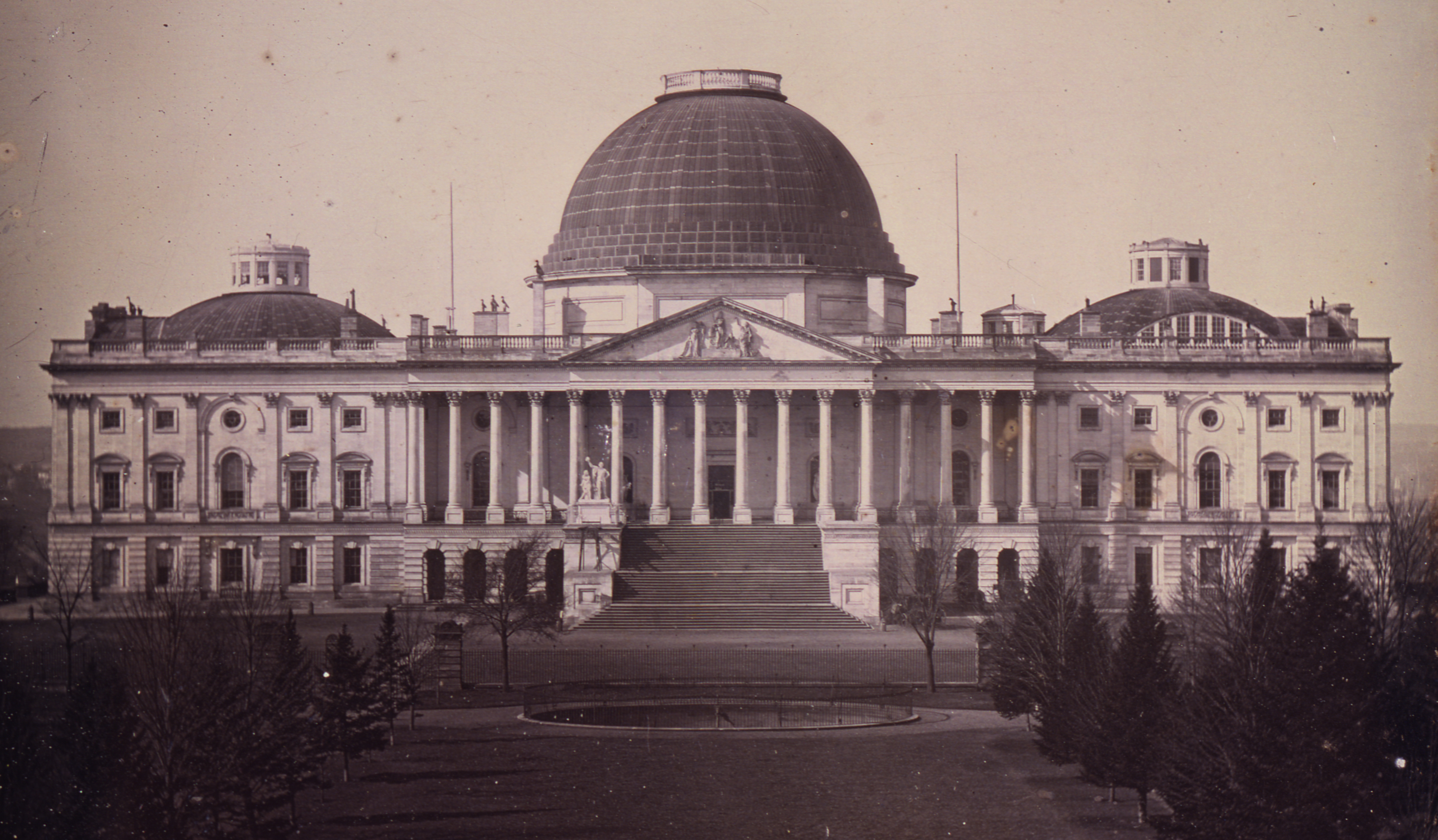
The U.S. Capitol in 1846. American lawmakers were deeply suspicious about Mormonism, their government, and the practice of polygamy.

This account was further supported by Territorial Chief Justice Kinney in reports to Washington, where he recited examples of what he believed to be Brigham Young's perversion of Utah's judicial system and further urged his removal from office and the establishment of a one-regiment U.S. Army garrison in the territory. There were further charges of treason, battery, theft, and fraud made by other officials, including Federal Surveyors and Federal Indian Agents. Furniss states that most federal reports from Utah to Washington "left unclear whether the [Mormons] habitually kicked their dogs; otherwise, their calendar of infamy in Utah was complete".

As early as 1852, Dr. John M. Bernhisel, Utah's Mormon delegate to Congress, had suggested that an impartial committee be sent to investigate the actual conditions in the territory. This call for an investigation was renewed during the crisis of 1857 by Bernhisel and even by Senator Stephen A. Douglas. However, the President would not wait. Under massive popular and political pressure, President Buchanan decided to take decisive action against the Mormons soon after his inauguration on March 4, 1857.

President Buchanan first decided to appoint a new governor in place of Brigham Young. The position was offered to several individuals who refused, and the President finally settled on Alfred Cumming during the summer. While Young became aware of the change in territorial administration through press reports and other sources, he received no official notification of his replacement until Cumming arrived in the Territory in November 1857. Buchanan also decided to send a force of 2,500 army troops to build a post in Utah and to act as a posse comitatus once the new governor had been installed. They were ordered not to take offensive action against the Mormons but to enter the territory, enforce the laws under the direction of the new governor, and defend themselves if attacked.

== Troop movements ==
=== July–November 1857: tactical standoff ===
==== Preparations ====
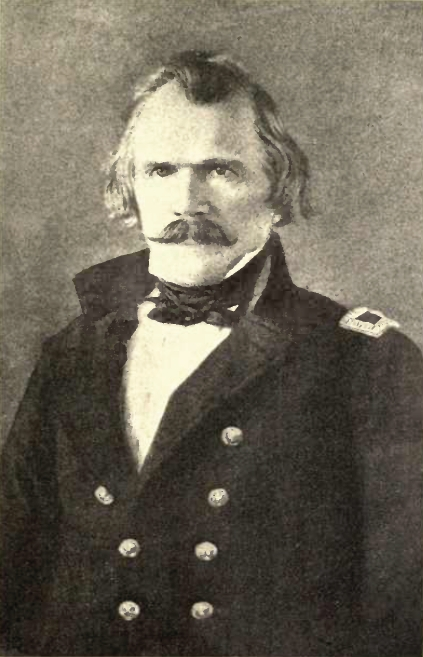
Colonel Albert Sidney Johnston led the Utah Expedition to put down a Mormon rebellion against the Union. In the Civil War, he became a high-ranking general in the Confederate Army and was killed at the Battle of Shiloh on April 6, 1862.

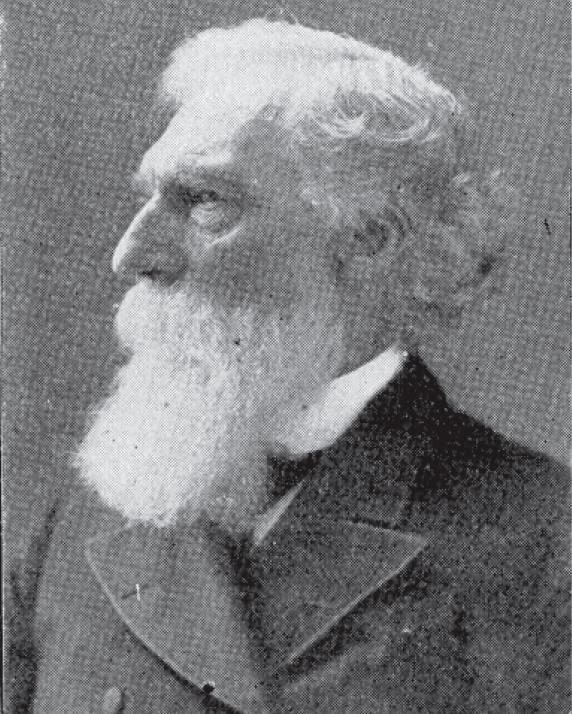
Daniel H. Wells was a member of the LDS Church First Presidency, commander of the Nauvoo Legion, and later mayor of Salt Lake City.

Although the Utah Expedition had begun to gather as early as May under orders from General Winfield Scott, the first soldiers did not leave Fort Leavenworth, Kansas, until 18 July 1857. The troops were originally led by Gen. William S. Harney. However, affairs in "Bleeding Kansas" forced Harney to remain behind to deal with skirmishes between pro-slavery and free-soiler militants. The Expedition's cavalry, the 2nd Dragoons, was kept in Kansas for the same reason. Because of Harney's unavailability, Col. Edmund Alexander was charged with the first detachment of troops headed for Utah. However, the overall command was assigned to Col. Albert Sidney Johnston, who did not leave Kansas until much later. As it was, July was already far into the campaigning season, and the army and their supply train were unprepared for winter in the Rocky Mountains. The army was not given instructions on how to react in case of resistance.

The Mormons' lack of information on the army's mission created apprehension and led to their defensive preparations. While rumors spread during the spring that an army was coming to Utah and Brigham Young had been replaced as governor, this was not confirmed until late July. Mormon mail contractors, including Porter Rockwell and Abraham O. Smoot, received word in Missouri that their contract was canceled and that the Army was on the move. The men quickly returned to Salt Lake City and notified Brigham Young that U.S. Army units were marching on the Mormons. Young announced the approach of the army to a large group of Latter-day Saints gathered in Big Cottonwood Canyon for Pioneer Day celebrations on 24 July.

Young disagreed with Buchanan's choices for governor of the territory. Although Young's secular position simplified his administration of the Territory, he believed his religious authority was more important among a nearly homogeneous population of Mormons. Young and the Mormon community feared renewed persecution and possibly annihilation by a large body of federal troops. Mormons remembered previous conflicts when they had lived near numerous non-Mormons. In 1838, they were driven from Missouri into Illinois under the direction of the Governor of Missouri, who issued the infamous Extermination Order. Mormons' state of mind was further alarmed when they learned in late June 1857 that LDS Apostle Parley P. Pratt had recently been murdered while serving a mission in Arkansas.

Fearing the worst, Young ordered residents throughout Utah territory to prepare for evacuation, making plans to burn their homes and property and stockpile food and stock feed. Guns were manufactured, and ammunition was cast. Mormon colonists in small outlying communities in the Carson Valley and San Bernardino, California were ordered to leave their homes to consolidate with the main body of Latter-day Saints in Northern and Central Utah. All LDS missionaries serving in the United States and Europe were recalled. Young also sent George A. Smith to the settlements of southern Utah to prepare them for action. Young's strategies to defend the Saints vacillated between all-out war, a more limited confrontation, and retreat.

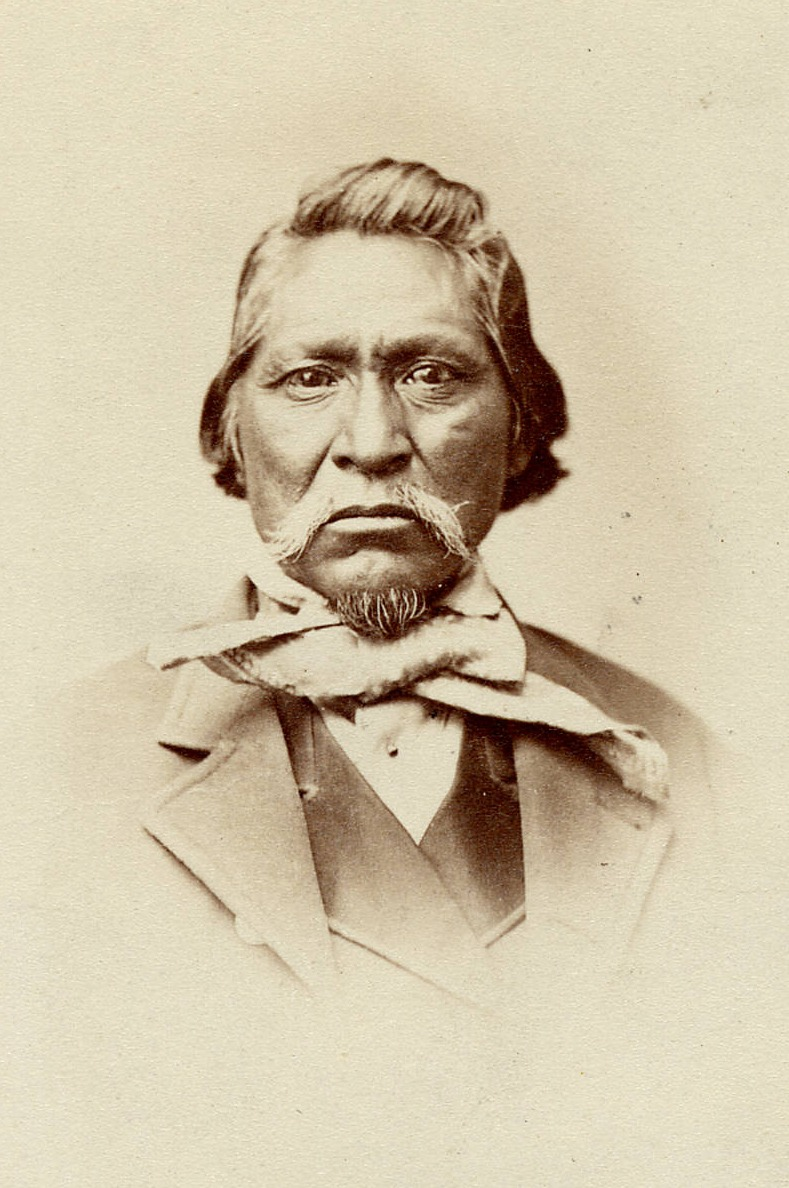
Kanosh was a Ute chief and Mormon convert. He met with Brigham Young on September 1, 1857, along with other Indian leaders.

An alliance with the Indians was central to Young's strategy for war, although his relations with them had been strained since the settlers' arrival in 1847. Young had generally adopted a policy of conversion and conciliation towards native tribes. Some Mormon leaders encouraged intermarriage with the Indians so that the two peoples might "unite together" and their "interests become one".

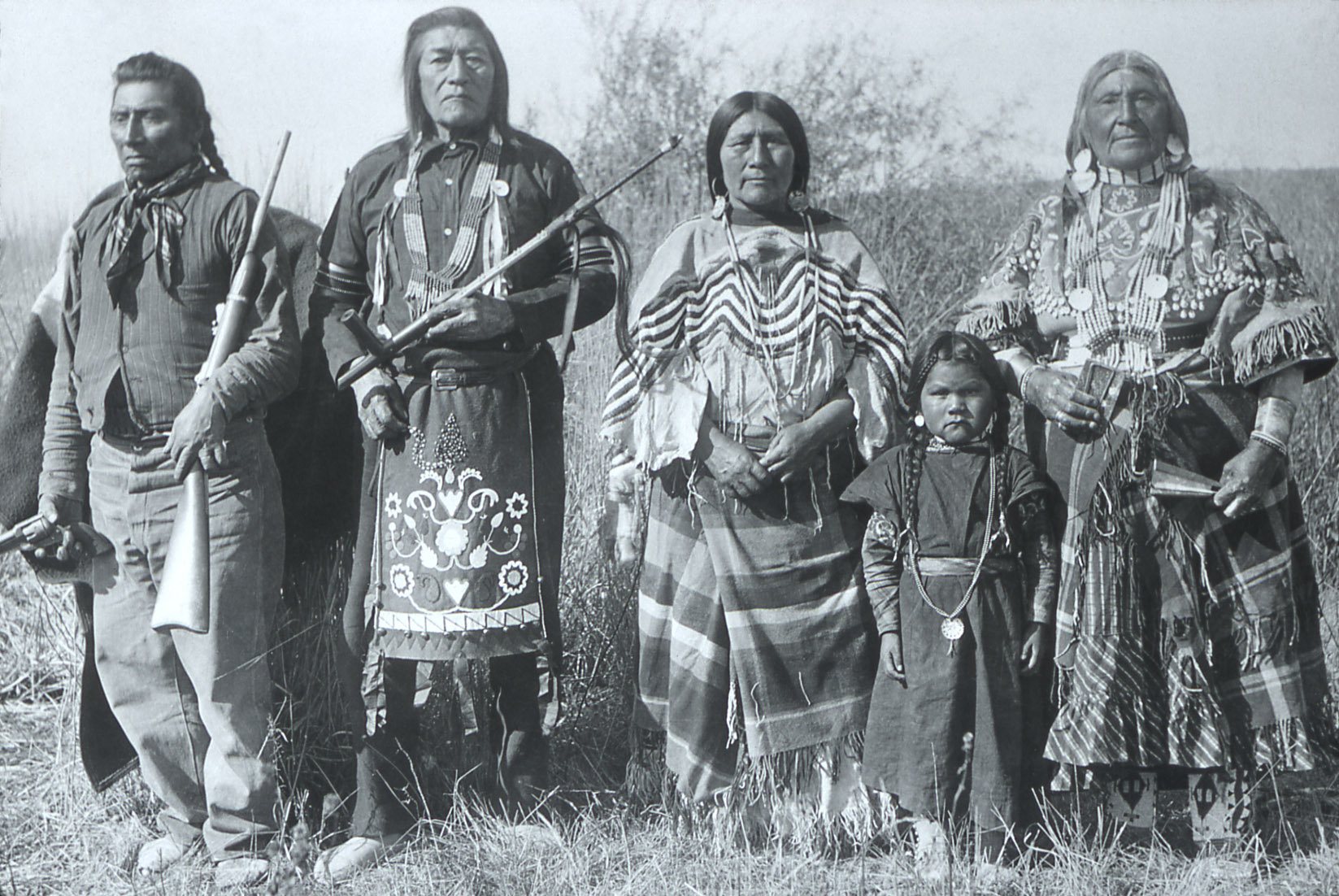
Members of the Bannock tribe. The Bannock led a raid on the Latter-day Saint mission of Fort Limhi in February 1858.

Between August 30 and September 1, Young met with Indian delegations and gave them permission to take all of the livestock then on the northern and southern trails into California (the Fancher Party was at that time on the southern trail). This meeting may have been Young's attempt to win Indian support against the United States and refrain from raids against Mormon settlements. In sermons on August 16 and again one month later, Young publicly urged the emigrant wagon trains to keep away from the Territory. Despite Young's efforts, Indians attacked Mormon settlements during the course of the Utah War, including a raid on Fort Limhi on the Salmon River in Oregon Territory in February 1858 and attacks in Tooele County just west of Great Salt Lake City.

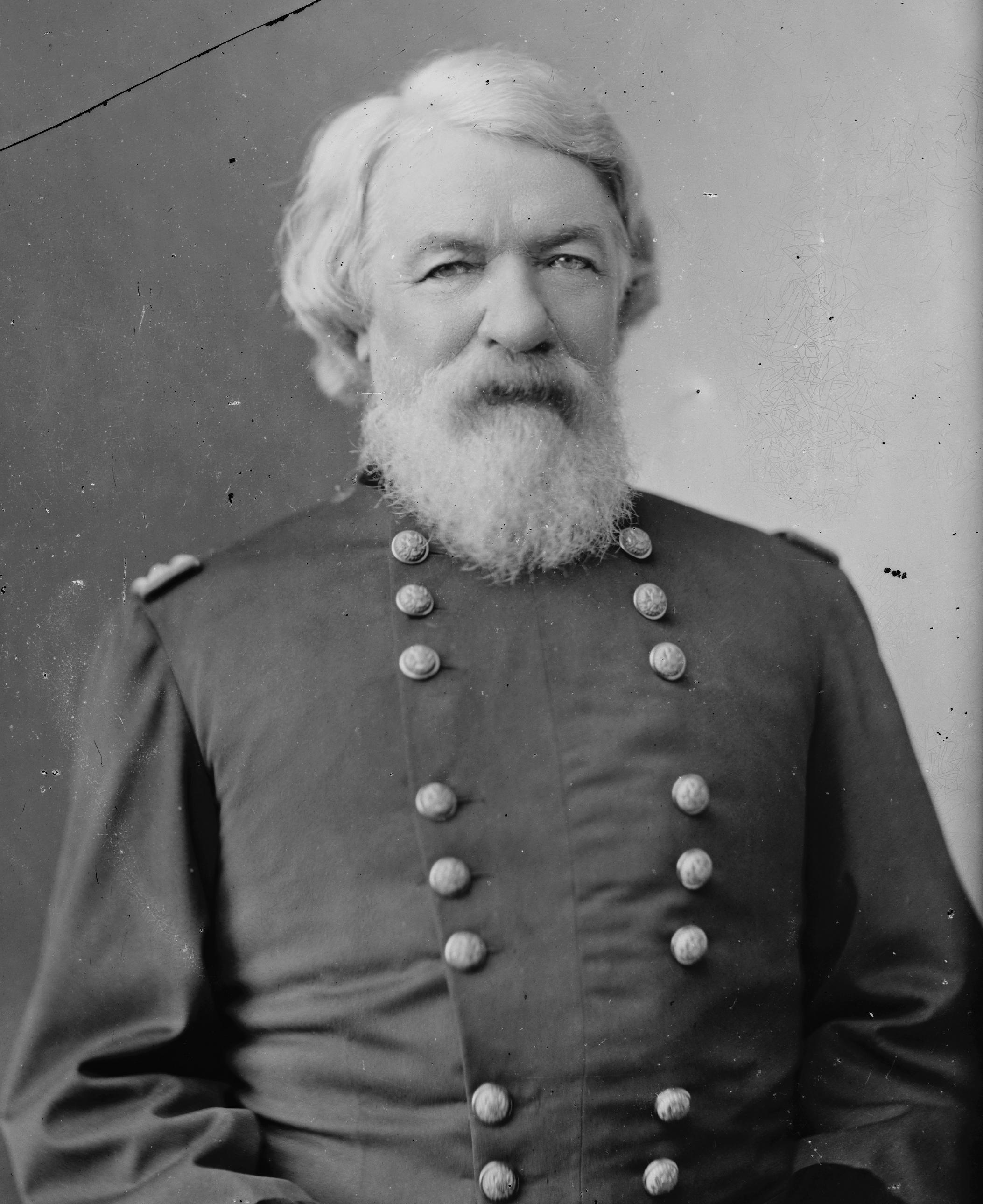
Major General Stewart Van Vliet of the U.S. Army.

In early August, Young re-activated the Nauvoo Legion. This was the Mormon militia created during the conflict in Illinois. The Nauvoo Legion was under the command of Daniel H. Wells and consisted of all able-bodied men between 15 and 60. Young ordered the Legion to take delaying actions, essentially harassing federal troops. He planned to buy time for the Mormon settlements to prepare for either battle or evacuation and create a window for negotiations with the Buchanan Administration. Thus, in mid-August, militia Colonel Robert T. Burton and a reconnaissance unit were sent east from Salt Lake City with orders to observe the oncoming American regiments and protect LDS emigrants traveling on the Mormon Trail.

==== Captain Van Vliet ====
On July 18, 1857, U.S. Army Captain Stewart Van Vliet, an assistant quartermaster, and a small escort were ordered to proceed directly from Kansas to Salt Lake City, ahead of the main body of troops. Van Vliet carried a letter to Young from General Harney ordering Young to make arrangements for the citizens of Utah to accommodate and supply the troops once they arrived. However, Harney's letter did not mention that Young had been replaced as governor, nor did it detail what the mission of the troops would be once they arrived, and these omissions sparked even greater distrust among the Saints. On his journey, reports reached Van Vliet that his company might be in danger from Mormon raiders on the trail. The Captain, therefore, left his escort and proceeded alone.

Van Vliet arrived in Salt Lake City on September 8. Historian Harold Schindler states that his mission was to contact Governor Young and inform him of the expedition's mission: to escort the new appointees, to act as a posse comitatus and to establish at least two and perhaps three new U.S. Army camps in Utah. Conversing with Van Vliet, Young denied complicity in the destruction of the law offices of U.S. Federal Judge Stiles and expressed concern that he (Young) might suffer the same fate as the previous Mormon leader, Joseph Smith, to which Van Vliet replied, "I do not think it is the intention of the government to arrest you," said Van Vliet, "but to install a new governor of the territory". Van Vliet's instructions were to buy provisions for the troops and to inform the people of Utah that the troops would only be employed as a posse comitatus when called on by the civil authority to aid in the execution of the laws.

Van Vliet's arrival in Salt Lake City was welcomed cautiously by the Mormon leadership. Van Vliet had been previously known by the Latter-day Saints in Iowa, and they trusted and respected him. However, he found the residents of Utah determined to defend themselves. He interviewed leaders and townspeople and "attended Sunday services, heard emotional speeches, and saw the Saints raise their hands in a unanimous resolution to guard against any 'invader'". Van Vliet found it impossible to persuade resentful Mormon leaders that the Army had peaceful intentions. He quickly recognized that supplies or accommodations for the Army would not be forthcoming. But Young told Van Vliet that the Mormons did not desire war, and "if we can keep the peace for this winter, I do think there will be something turned up that may save the shedding of blood". However, marking a change from earlier pronouncements, Young declared that under threat from an approaching army, he would not allow the new governor and federal officers to enter Utah. Nevertheless, Van Vliet told Young that he believed that the Mormons "have been lied about the worst of any people I ever saw". He promised to stop the Utah Expedition on his own authority, and on September 14, he returned east through the Mormon fortifications then being built in Echo Canyon (see below).

Upon returning to the main body of the army, Van Vliet reported that the Latter-day Saints would not resort to actual hostilities but would seek to delay the troops in every way possible. He also reported that they were ready to burn their homes and destroy their crops and that the route through Echo Canyon would be a death trap for a large body of troops. Van Vliet continued on to Washington, D.C., in company with Dr. John M. Bernhisel, Utah Territory's delegate to Congress. There, Van Vliet reported on the situation in the west and became an advocate for the Latter-day Saints and the end of the Utah War.

==== Martial law ====
As early as August 5, Young had decided to declare martial law throughout the Territory, and a document was printed to that effect. However, historians question the intent of this proclamation as it was never widely circulated, if at all, and while copies of the document exist, there is no mention of it in any contemporary sources. One commentary opines that "during most of August, the Mormon leaders had not precisely focused on a strategy for dealing with the approaching army; and after the first proclamation was struck off, they likely had second thoughts about a direct confrontation with the federal government. On August 29, Brigham Young instructed Daniel H. Wells to draft a second proclamation of martial law."

On September 15, the day after Van Vliet left Salt Lake City, Young publicly declared martial law in Utah with a document almost identical to that printed in early August. This second proclamation received wide circulation throughout the Territory and was delivered by messenger to Col. Alexander with the approaching army. The most important provision forbade "all armed forces of every description from coming into this Territory, under any pretense whatsoever". It also commanded that "all the forces in said Territory hold themselves in readiness to march at a moment's notice to repel any and all such invasion." But more important to California and Oregon bound travelers was the third section that stated "Martial law is hereby declared to exist in this Territory ... and no person shall be allowed to pass or repass into, through or from this territory without a permit from the proper officer."

==== Contact ====
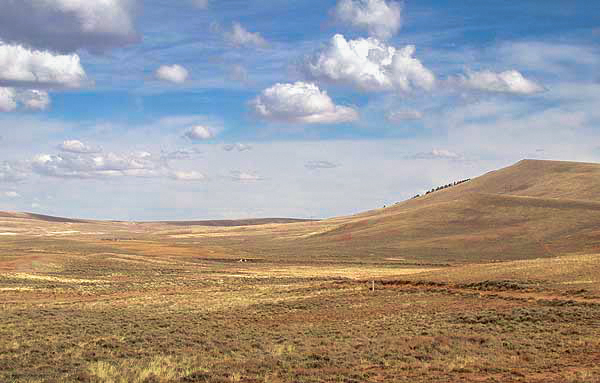
South Pass. The high desert of southwestern Wyoming held little cover for either the U.S. army or the Nauvoo Legion.

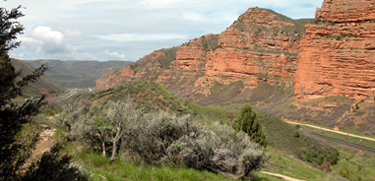
Echo Canyon formed the most direct route into the Salt Lake Valley. The Nauvoo Legion fortified the narrowest sections of the canyon in case the army attempted to break through. There is disagreement as to how effective their preparations would have been had battle occurred.

The Nauvoo Legion finally made contact with federal troops in late September just west of South Pass. The militia immediately began to burn grass along the trail and stampede the army's cattle. In early October, Legion members burned down Fort Bridger lest it falls into the hands of the army. A few days later, three large Army supply trains that were trailing the main army detachments were burned by Mormon cavalry led by Lot Smith. Associated horses and cattle were "liberated" from the supply trains and taken west by the militia. Few if any shots were fired in these exchanges, and the Army's lack of cavalry left them more or less open to Mormon raids. However, the army began to grow weary of the constant Mormon harassment throughout the fall. At one point, Colonel Alexander mounted roughly 100 men on army mules to combat the Mormon militia. In the early morning of 15 October, this "jackass cavalry" had a run-in with Lot Smith's command and fired over 30 bullets at the Mormons from 150 yards. No one was killed, but one Mormon took a bullet through his hat band, and one horse was grazed.

Through October and November, between 1,200 and 2,000 militiamen were stationed in Echo Canyon and Weber Canyon. These two narrow passes lead into the Salt Lake Valley, and provided the easiest access to the populated areas of northern Utah. Dealing with a heavy snowfall and intense cold, the Mormon men built fortifications, dug rifle pits and dammed streams and rivers in preparation for a possible battle either that fall or the following spring. Several thousand more militiamen prepared their families for evacuation and underwent military training.

On October 16, Major Joseph Taylor and his Adjutant William Stowell of the Nauvoo Legion encountered a camp in the fog ahead of them. Supposing them to be the battalion of Lot Smith, they approached not realizing it was a detachment of US Army soldiers. They were captured and taken back to the main detachment where they were questioned by Col. Alexander. Taylor and Stowell gave exaggerated accounts of "twenty-five to thirty thousand" Mormon militia camped in Echo Canyon to repel the army if they were to pass through. The two men were held as prisoners at Camp Scott near Fort Bridger.

Colonel Alexander, whose troops referred to him as "old granny", opted not to enter Utah through Echo Canyon following Van Vliet's report, as well as news of the Mormon fortifications by Taylor and Stowell. Alexander instead maneuvered his troops around the Mormon defenses, entering Utah from the north along the Bear River before being forced to turn back upon running into a heavy blizzard in late October. Colonel Johnston took command of the combined U.S. forces in early November, by this time the command was hampered by a lack of supplies, animals, and the early onset of winter. Johnston was a more aggressive commander than Alexander but this predicament rendered him unable to immediately attack through Echo Canyon into Utah. Instead, he settled his troops into ill-equipped winter camps designated Camp Scott and Eckelsville, near the burned-out remains of Fort Bridger, now in the state of Wyoming. Johnston was soon joined by the 2nd Dragoons commanded by Lieutenant Colonel Philip St. George Cooke, who had accompanied Alfred Cumming, Utah's new governor, and a roster of other federal officials from Fort Leavenworth. However, they too were critically short of horses and supplies.

In early November, Joseph Taylor of the Nauvoo Legion escaped captivity at Camp Scott and returned to Salt Lake City to report conditions of the army to Brigham Young. On 21 November, Cumming sent a proclamation to the citizens of Utah declaring them to be in rebellion. On November 26, 1857, Brigham Young wrote letter to Colonel Johnston at Fort Bridger inquiring of the prisoners and stating of William "....if you imagine that keeping, mistreating or killing Mr. Stowell will resound to your advantage, future experience may add to the stock of your better judgment."

At Eckelsville, Chief Justice Eckels and Governor Cumming set up a temporary seat of territorial government. Eckels convened a grand jury on December 30, which indicted twenty Mormons for high treason, including Brigham Young, Heber C. Kimball, Daniel H. Wells, John Taylor, George D. Grant, Lot Smith, Orrin Porter Rockwell, William A. Hickman, Albert Carrington, Joseph Taylor, Robert Burton, James Ferguson, Ephraim Hanks, and William Stowell, among others. On January 5, 1858, Justice Eckels held a court proceeding where William Stowell was arraigned in person on behalf of all of the defendants on charges of high treason. Stowell pled not guilty and requested more time to prepare for trial. Johnston awaited resupply and reinforcement and prepared to attack the Mormon positions after the spring thaw.

=== December 1857 – March 1858: winter intermission ===
==== Soldiers advance up the Colorado River ====
During this winter season, Lt. Joseph Christmas Ives was embarking on an assigned task of exploring and surveying the Colorado River by steamship to determine the extent of the river's navigability. While steaming upstream in the Explorer from the Colorado River Delta toward Fort Yuma in early January 1858, Ives received two hastily written dispatches from his commanding officer informing him of the outbreak of the Mormon War. These letters reported that Mormons were already engaged in hostilities with United States Army forces who were attempting to enter Utah from the east, and Ives's expedition took on a new meaning. The War Department was now considering launching a second front in Utah via the Colorado. Ives, who had anticipated a leisurely ascent of the river, was instructed to disregard his original orders. He was now ordered to ascend the Colorado to the head of navigation with utmost speed to determine the feasibility of transporting troops and war material up the Colorado by steamer to the mouth of the Virgin River, and thence overland to Utah. It was also rumored in Washington that Mormons might try to retreat down the Colorado River and into Sonora. An army advancing up the Colorado River would cut off this escape route. Ives was instructed to proceed with extreme caution, since treacherous Mormons might already be lurking on the Colorado above Yuma.

Meanwhile, George Alonzo Johnson, a merchant who had an established business transporting goods by steamship between the Colorado River Delta and Fort Yuma, was upset that he had not been awarded command of the expedition's original exploratory mission. When Ives was chosen instead, he used the rumors of Indian unrest and purported Mormon designs on the Colorado river and successfully organized a second armed expedition in competition with Ives. He obtained an escort of soldiers commanded by Lt. James A. White from Fort Yuma's acting commander, Lt. A. A. Winder. On December 31, 1857, several days before Ives's arrival at Fort Yuma, Johnson's party steamed upstream from Yuma aboard the steamer General Jesup.

Ives arrived at Yuma on the evening of January 5, 1858. Reacting to Johnson's departure and urgent dispatches from Washington, Ives had taken an overland shortcut on horseback in order to reorganize his command prior to the steamer's arrival and to facilitate a rapid ascent to the Virgin River as commanded. Ives' party steamed up the Colorado River with frequent contact with Mojaves and other natives who traded with them and were allowed to board their vessel. Determining that they could not ascend the river beyond Black Canyon they turned back downstream. During their descent, the Mojave informed Ives that Mormons had recently been among the Mojaves and were inciting unrest by intimating that the real purpose of the river expedition was to steal Indian lands.

Upon hearing of Ives's steamer on the Colorado, Mormons feared that Ives might be bringing an army to Utah from the South. Jacob Hamblin, famed Mormon missionary of the Southwest, whose activities including establishing and maintaining Mormon–Indian alliances along the Colorado, set out in March with three other companions from Las Vegas to learn more about Ives's intentions. From excited Indians they learned of the approach of an "army" marching overland from Yuma – which in reality was Ives's packtrain.

Hamblin's group made direct contact with Ives expedition by sending Thaïes Haskell, to hail the steamer's crew from the bank while the other Mormons remained in hiding. He was to pass himself off as a renegade from Utah and then learn as much as possible about Ives's intentions; however, his guise failed since one of Ives's men who had been to Utah claimed to recognize him as a Mormon bishop.

The journals of members of the Ives expedition as well as the Mormons from Hamblin's group attest to the tension and war hysteria among both the US Army and the Mormons in these remote territories.

==== Thomas L. Kane ====
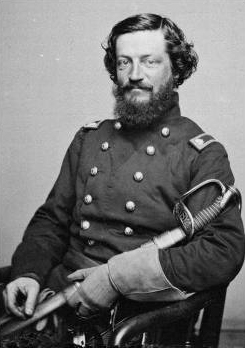
Thomas L. Kane in the uniform of a Union lieutenant colonel in 1861. He received a brevet promotion to major general in 1865.

The lull in hostilities during the winter provided an opportunity for negotiations, and direct confrontation was avoided. As early as August 1857, Brigham Young had written to Thomas L. Kane of Pennsylvania asking for help. Kane was a man of some political prominence who had been helpful to the Mormons in their westward migration and later political controversies. In December, Kane contacted President Buchanan and offered to mediate between the Mormons and the federal government. In Buchanan's State of the Union address earlier in the month, he had taken a hard stand against the Mormon rebellion, and had actually asked Congress to enlarge the size of the regular army to deal with the crisis. However, in his conversation with Kane, Buchanan worried that the Mormons might destroy Johnston's Army at severe political cost to himself, and stated that he would pardon the Latter-day Saints for their actions if they would submit to government authority. He therefore granted Kane unofficial permission to attempt mediation, although he held little hope for the success of negotiations. Upon approval of his mission by the President, Kane immediately started for Utah. During the heavy winter of 1857–1858, he traveled under the alias "Dr. Osborne" over 3,000 miles from the East coast to Utah, first by ship to Panama, crossing the isthmus via the newly constructed (1855) Panama Railway, and then taking a second ship to San Francisco. Upon learning that the Sierra passes were blocked for the winter, he immediately took a ship to San Pedro, the unimproved harbor for what is now Los Angeles. He was met there by Mormons who took him overland through San Bernardino and Las Vegas, to Salt Lake City on the strenuous southern branch of the California Trail, arriving in February 1858.

When Kane arrived in February 1858, Mormons referred to him as "the man the Lord had raised up as a peacemaker". Details of the negotiations between Kane and Young are unclear. It seems that Kane successfully convinced Young to accept Buchanan's appointment of Cumming as Territorial governor, although Young had expressed his willingness to accept such terms at the very beginning of the crisis. It is uncertain if Kane was able to convince Young at this time to allow the army into Utah. After his meeting with Brigham Young, Kane traveled to Camp Scott arriving on March 10, 1858. After deliberations, Governor Cumming and a small non-military escort which included Thomas Kane, left Camp Scott on April 5 and traveled to Salt Lake to formally install the new Governor. Governor Cumming was welcomed to Utah by "its most distinguished citizens" on April 12, 1858 and was shortly installed in his new office. Three days later, word was sent to Colonel Johnston that the Governor had been properly received by the people and was able to fully discharge his duties as Governor.

After spending some time in Salt Lake City, Governor Cumming made the return trip back to Eckelsville, departing Salt Lake on May 16. He met with military commanders and new authorities to make plans to travel into the valley. At the end of May, Major Benjamin McCulloch of Texas and Kentucky senator-elect Lazarus W. Powell arrived at Camp Scott as peace commissioners with a proclamation of general pardon from President Buchanan for previous indictments handed down to Mormon leaders. As the Governor and his military escort descended Echo Canyon to Salt Lake City, many of the Mormon militia men including now released prisoner William Stowell, successfully fooled Cumming as to the size of the armed contingent lining the canyon. Mormon militia men marched in front of camp fires in circles at night to make it appear there were many shadows. When Cumming approached an encampment, the heavy set Governor lumbered over to speak to the saluting men telling them the conflict was over and they could return to their families. After each meeting, Cumming would travel with his escort to the next encampment down Echo Canyon to give the same address, not realizing many of the men had run through the dark ahead of the Governor with a small change of costume from the last encampment, making their numbers appear much larger than they were. Many of the Mormon militia men heard the Governor speech multiple times without being detected by Cumming.

The new Governor was courteously received by Young and the Utah citizenry in the first week of June 1858. Cumming thereafter became a moderate voice, and opposed the hardline against the Mormons proposed by Colonel Johnston and other federal officials traveling with the army to be installed in the territory. Kane left Utah for Washington, D.C. in May to report to President Buchanan on the results of his mission.

=== April–July 1858: resolution ===
==== Move south ====
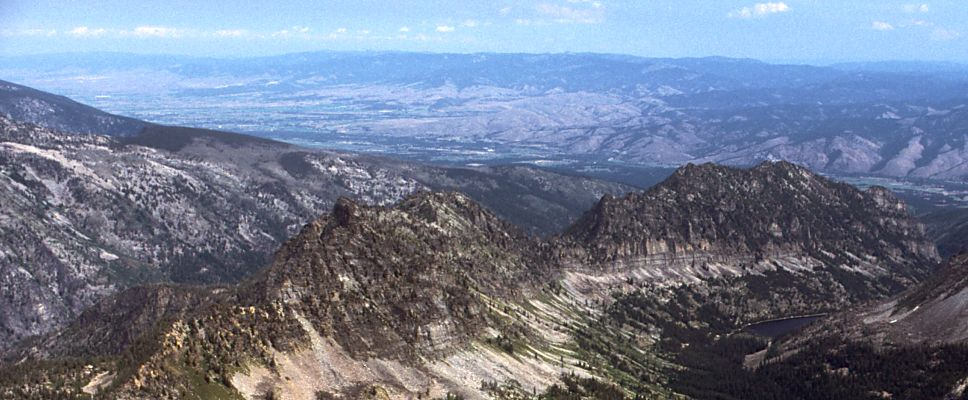
Brigham Young intended to evacuate the Latter-day Saints to the Bitterroot Valley, which is now in Montana. However, circumstances necessitated a "Move South" rather than a "Move North".

Despite Thomas Kane's successful mission, tension continued throughout the spring and summer of 1858. Young was willing to support Cumming as governor, but he still feared persecution and violence if the army entered Utah. Indeed, as the snows melted, approximately 3,000 additional U.S. Army reinforcements set out on the westward trails to resupply and strengthen the Army's presence.

In Utah, the Nauvoo Legion was bolstered as Mormon communities were asked to supply and equip an additional thousand volunteers to be placed in the over one hundred miles of mountains that separated Camp Scott and Great Salt Lake City. Nevertheless, by the end of the winter Young had decided to enforce his "Sevastopol Policy", a plan to evacuate the Territory and burn it to the ground rather than fight the army openly. Members of the Hudson's Bay Company and the British government feared that the Mormons planned to seek refuge on Vancouver Island off the coast of British Columbia.

David Bigler has shown that Young originally intended this evacuation to go northwards toward the Bitterroot Valley in present-day Montana. He believed conditions there were sufficient for the Mormons to live, but difficult enough that others would be discouraged from following them or settling there. However, the Bannock and Shoshone raid against Fort Limhi in February 1858 blocked this northern retreat. Consequently, at the end of March 1858, settlers in the northern counties of Utah including Salt Lake City boarded up their homes and farms and began to move south, leaving small groups of men and boys behind to burn the settlements if necessary. As early as February 1858, Young had sent parties to explore the White Mountains on what is now the Utah/Nevada border where he, erroneously, believed there were valleys that could comfortably harbor up to 100,000 individuals. Residents of Utah County just south of Salt Lake were asked to build and maintain roads and to help the incoming inhabitants of the northern communities. Mormon Elias Blackburn recorded in his journal, "The roads are crowded with the Saints moving south. ... Very busy dealing out provisions to the public hands. I am feeding 100 men, all hard at work." Even after Alfred Cumming was installed as governor in mid-April, the "Move South" continued unabated. The movement may have included the relocation of nearly 30,000 people between March and July. Historians Allen and Leonard write:

It was an extraordinary operation. As the Saints moved south they cached all the stone cut for the Salt Lake Temple and covered the foundations to make it resemble a plowed field. They boxed and carried with them twenty thousand bushels of tithing grain, as well as machinery, equipment, and all the Church records and books. The sight of thirty thousand people moving south was awesome, and the amazed Governor Cumming did all he could to persuade them to return to their homes. Brigham Young replied that if the troops were withdrawn from the territory, the people would stop moving.

== Utah War Peace Commission ==
Utah War Peace Commission
- Type: Peace agreement
- Context: Utah War
- Signed: June 12, 1858
- Location: Salt Lake City, Utah Territory
- Effective: June 12, 1858
- Condition: Acceptance of federal authority by the Mormons
- Mediators: Benjamin McCulloch; Lazarus W. Powell
- Negotiators: (United States) James Buchanan; Brigham Young; (United States) /Thomas L. Kane
- Signatories: James Buchanan; Brigham Young
- Parties: United States; Utah Territory
- Language: English

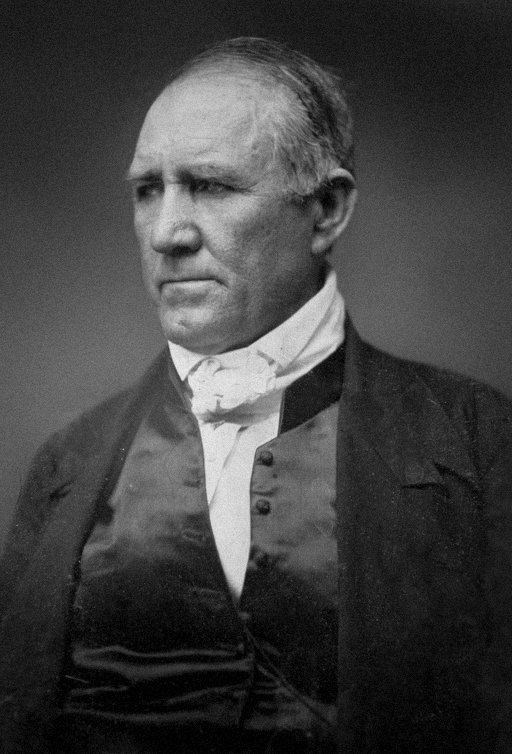
Senator Sam Houston of Texas strenuously opposed the Utah Expedition.

In the meantime, President Buchanan had come under considerable pressure from Congress to end the crisis. In February 1858, Senator Sam Houston of Texas stated that a war against the Mormons would be

... one of the most fearful calamities that has befallen this country, from its inception to the present moment. I deprecate it as an intolerable evil. I am satisfied that the Executive has not had the information he ought to have had on this subject before making such a movement as he has directed to be made.

On April 1, Senator Simon Cameron of Pennsylvania declared that he would support a bill to authorize volunteers to fight in Utah and other parts of the frontier only because

... this war is a war of the Administration; and I desire that the responsibility of it shall be on the Administration. I have no faith in their ability to conduct it; and I believe that before a year has passed over it will be evident to every citizen of the country that they have committed a great blunder ...

Therefore in April, the President sent an official peace commission to Utah consisting of Benjamin McCulloch and Lazarus Powell, which arrived in June. The commission offered a free pardon to the Mormons for any acts incident to the conflict if they would submit to government authority. This included permitting Johnston's Army into the Territory. The commissioners further assured that the government would not interfere with their religion. They also hinted that once the new governor was installed and the laws yielded to, "a necessity will no longer exist to retain any portion of the army in the Territory, except what may be required to keep the Indians in check and to secure the passage of emigrants to California." While all these private assurances were inducements for the Latter-day Saints to bend to federal will, Buchanan maintained a tougher stance in his public statements.

PROCLAMATION ON THE REBELLION IN UTAH ... Now, therefore, I, James Buchanan, President of the United States, have thought proper to issue this, my Proclamation, enjoining upon all public officers in the Territory of Utah to be diligent and faithful, to the full extent of their power, in the execution of the laws; commanding all citizens of the United States in said Territory to aid and assist the officers in the performance of their duties; offering to the inhabitants of Utah, who shall submit to the laws, a free pardon for the seditions and treasons heretofore by them committed; warning those who shall persist, after notice of this proclamation, in the present rebellion against the United States, that they must expect no further lenity, but look to be rigorously dealt with according to their deserts; and declaring that the military forces now in Utah, and hereafter to be sent there, will not be withdrawn until the inhabitants of that Territory shall manifest a proper sense of the duty which they owe to this government.

— James Buchanan April 6, 1858.

Brigham Young accepted Buchanan's terms and pardon, although he denied Utah had ever rebelled against the United States. Buchanan's proclamation was also unpopular among the Mormon rank and file. Arthur P. Welchman, a member of a company of missionaries that was recalled due to the war, wrote of the document:

June – On the head-waters of the Sweet-Water, met Grosebecks' camp going to Platt Bridge for a train of goods. By these Brethren we had a proclamation from President Buchannan [sic] to the Inhabitants of Utah read to us. It was so full of lies, and showed so much meanness, that it elicited three groans from the company.

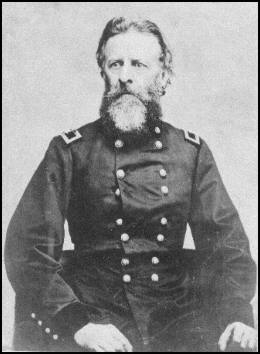
Lt. Col. Philip St. George Cooke had led the Mormon Battalion and had an abiding respect for the Latter-day Saints.

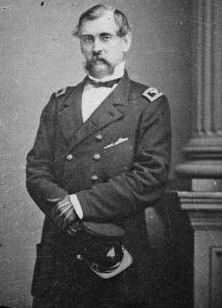
Lt. Col. Charles Ferguson Smith relieved General Johnston of the command of the Department of Utah in 1860.

On June 19, a newly arrived reporter for the New York Herald somewhat inaccurately wrote, "Thus was peace made – thus was ended the 'Mormon war', which ... may be thus historicized: – Killed, none; wounded, none; fooled, everybody." At the end of June 1858, the Army troops under General Johnston entered the Salt Lake Valley unhindered. Riding through the still empty streets of Salt Lake City on June 26, an embittered Johnston was heard to say that he would have given "his plantation for a chance to bombard the city for fifteen minutes". Lt. Col. Charles Ferguson Smith stated that he "did not care a damn who heard him; he would like to see every dammed Mormon hung by the neck." Philip St. George Cooke, who had led the Mormon Battalion during the Mexican War, merely bared his head in respect.

In early July, the Mormons from the northern settlements began to return to their homes after it was clear that no more reinforcements were being sent into Utah from either the east or west. Johnston's Army settled in Camp Floyd, in a valley 50 miles southwest of Salt Lake City and separated from Provo (the second-largest city in the territory) by Utah Lake and a small range of mountains. This remote location, neighbor only to a few farms and ranches, was chosen to decrease friction between the troops and the Mormons. The Army and the Mormons continued in a fragile co-existence until the troops left in 1861 when called back east for service in the American Civil War.

== Consequences ==
Although Eastern editors continued to condemn the Mormons' religious beliefs and practices, they praised their heroism in the face of military threat. By the time Governor Cumming was securely placed in office, the Utah War had become an embarrassment for President Buchanan. Called 'Buchanan's Blunder' by elements of the national press, the President was criticized for:

- failing to officially notify Governor Young about his replacement,
- incurring the expense of sending troops without investigating the reports on Utah's disloyalty to the United States,
- dispatching the expedition late in the season, and
- failing to provide an adequate resupply train for the winter.

However, the people of Utah lost much during the brief period of conflict. Largely due to their evacuation, the settlers' livelihoods and economic well-being were seriously impacted for at least that year and perhaps longer. Field crops had been ignored for most of the two-month-long planting season and livestock herds had been culled for the journey. A year's worth of work improving their living conditions had essentially been lost. Some poverty would be widespread in the territory for several years. A number of Mormon settlements in Idaho, Nevada and California would not be resettled for decades and some were permanently abandoned.

In addition, Utah was under nominal military occupation. Mormon historian Leonard J. Arrington noted that "the cream of the United States Army" reviled the Mormon settlers. Relations between the troops and their commanders with the Mormons were often tense. Fortunately, the near isolation of Camp Floyd kept interaction to a minimum, as troops stayed on or near their base. Settlers living near the 7,000 troops quartered in Cedar Valley did sell the troops lumber for building construction, farm produce and manufactured goods. When the army finally abandoned Camp Floyd in 1861 at the outbreak of the American Civil War, surplus goods worth an estimated four million dollars were auctioned off for a fraction of their value. However, in 1862, new troops arrived and built Fort Douglas in the foothills east of Salt Lake City.

One consequence of the Utah War was the creation of the famous Pony Express. During the war, Lot Smith and the Nauvoo Legion burned roughly 52 wagons belonging to outfitters Russell, Majors and Waddell. The government never reimbursed the outfitters for these losses, and in 1860 they formed the Pony Express to earn a government mail contract to keep them from falling into bankruptcy.

In the aftermath of the Utah War, Republicans won control of the House of Representatives in 1858. But every significant bill that they passed fell before the votes of southern Democratic Senators or suffered a presidential veto. The federal government remained stalemated and little could be done. By 1860, sectional strife split the Democratic Party into northern and southern wings, indirectly leading to the election of Republican Abraham Lincoln in 1860. Popular sovereignty, the defense of which had been a major cause of the Utah Expedition, was finally repudiated when the resolution of the slavery question sparked the American Civil War. Yet with the start of the Civil War, Republican majorities were able to pass legislation meant to curb the Mormon practice of polygamy such as the Morrill Anti-Bigamy Act of 1862. However, President Abraham Lincoln did not enforce these laws; instead, Lincoln gave Brigham Young tacit permission to ignore the Morrill Anti-Bigamy Act in exchange for not becoming involved with the American Civil War. General Patrick Edward Connor, commanding officer of the federal forces garrisoned at Fort Douglas, Utah beginning in 1862 was explicitly instructed to not confront the Mormons. In March 1863, Judge Kinney issued a writ against Young for violation of the Suppression of Polygamy Act. The writ was served by the United States marshal and the prisoner promptly appeared at the state-house where an investigation was held. A $2,000 bail bond was posted awaiting the decision of the grand jury. The all Mormon grand jury refused an indictment citing a lack of evidence for Young's marriage to Amelia Folsom in January of that year.

In the end, the Utah War started a slow decline for Mormon isolation and power in Utah. The Latter-day Saints lost control of the executive branch and the federal district courts, but maintained political authority in the Territorial Legislature and the powerful probate courts. In 1869, the Transcontinental Railroad was completed, and soon large numbers of "Gentiles" (non-Mormons) arrived in Utah to stay. Despite this, complete federal dominance was slow in coming. Conflict between the Mormons and the federal government, particularly over the issue of polygamy, would continue for nearly 40 years before Utah was finally made a state in 1896, and was perhaps not fully resolved until the Smoot Hearings of 1904–1907.

== Timeline ==
- March 1857: James Buchanan takes office as President of the United States, and decides to take action.
- April 1857: The press in the Eastern U.S. begins to speculate on who would be appointed to replace Brigham Young.
- 29 June 1857: U.S. President James Buchanan declares Utah in rebellion against the U.S. government, and mobilizes a regiment of the U.S. Army, initially led by Col. Edmund Alexander.
- 5 July 1857: Brigham Young refers in a sermon to "rumors" that the U.S. is sending 1,500–2,000 troops into the Utah Territory (Young 1857a, p. 5).
- 13 July 1857: President Buchanan appoints Alfred Cumming governor of Utah, and directs him to accompany the military forces into Utah.
- 18 July 1857: Col. Alexander and his troops begin the journey to Utah, at the same time, Mormons Porter Rockwell and Abraham Owen Smoot learn that the Army is on the move.
- 23 July 1857: Rockwell and Smoot arrive in Salt Lake City and inform Brigham Young of the government's plans.
- 28 August 1857: Col. Johnston is ordered to replace Gen. Harney as commander of the U.S. troops.
- 7–11 September 1857: An emigrant wagon train of non-Mormons is attacked at Mountain Meadows by a Mormon militia dressed as Paiute Indians. After several days siege, a group of Mormons under John D. Lee, approach the survivors and, under the promise of leading them to safety, kill nearly all of them.
- 15 September 1857: Brigham Young declares martial law, forbidding "all armed forces of every description from coming into this Territory, under any pretense whatsoever".
- 18 September 1857: U.S. troops leave Fort Leavenworth, Kansas headed for Utah.
- 5 October 1857: Lot Smith leads the Nauvoo Legion on a guerrilla-style attack on the provision wagons of the United States Army. Fifty-two wagons are burned.
- 3 November 1857: Col. Albert Sidney Johnston catches up with Col. Alexander and replaces him as commander. Johnston orders the regiment to spend the winter in Fort Bridger and to delay the move to Salt Lake City until next spring.
- February 1858: Thomas Kane, a friend of the Mormons, arrives in Salt Lake to act as a negotiator between the Mormons and the approaching army.
- March 1858: Kane visits Camp Scott, and persuades Governor Cumming to travel to Salt Lake City without his military escort, under guarantee of safe conduct.
- 23 March 1858: Brigham Young implements a scorched earth policy. Salt Lake City is vacated, with most of the saints relocating to settlements south of the Salt Lake Valley.
- 6 April 1858: James Buchanan: Proclamation on the Rebellion in Utah. ("a free pardon for the seditions and treasons heretofore by them committed;")
- 12 April 1858: Governor Cummings arrives in Utah, and is installed in office.
- June 1858: Johnston's army arrives in Utah, passing through a now-vacant Salt Lake city to establish Camp Floyd some 50 miles distant.
- 1861: Camp Floyd is abandoned at the outset of the Civil War.

== See also ==
- 1838 Mormon War (Missouri)
- Haun's Mill massacre (1838 Missouri)
- Missouri Executive Order 44 (1838)
- Illinois Mormon War (1844–1845)
- Mormon Exodus (1846–1857)
- Mormon Reformation (1856–1858)
- Mountain Meadows Massacre (1857)
- Morrisite War (1862)
- Morrill Anti-Bigamy Act (1862)
- Poland Act (1874)
- Reynolds v. United States (1879)
- Edmunds Act (1882)
- Edmunds-Tucker Act (1887)
- LDS Church v. United States (1890)
- 1890 Manifesto
- Salt Creek Canyon massacre
- Smoot Hearings (1903–1907)
- Second Manifesto (1904)
- Short Creek raid (1953)
- Theodemocracy
- List of conflicts in the United States
