= William Rufus Rogers Stowell =

Mormon pioneer

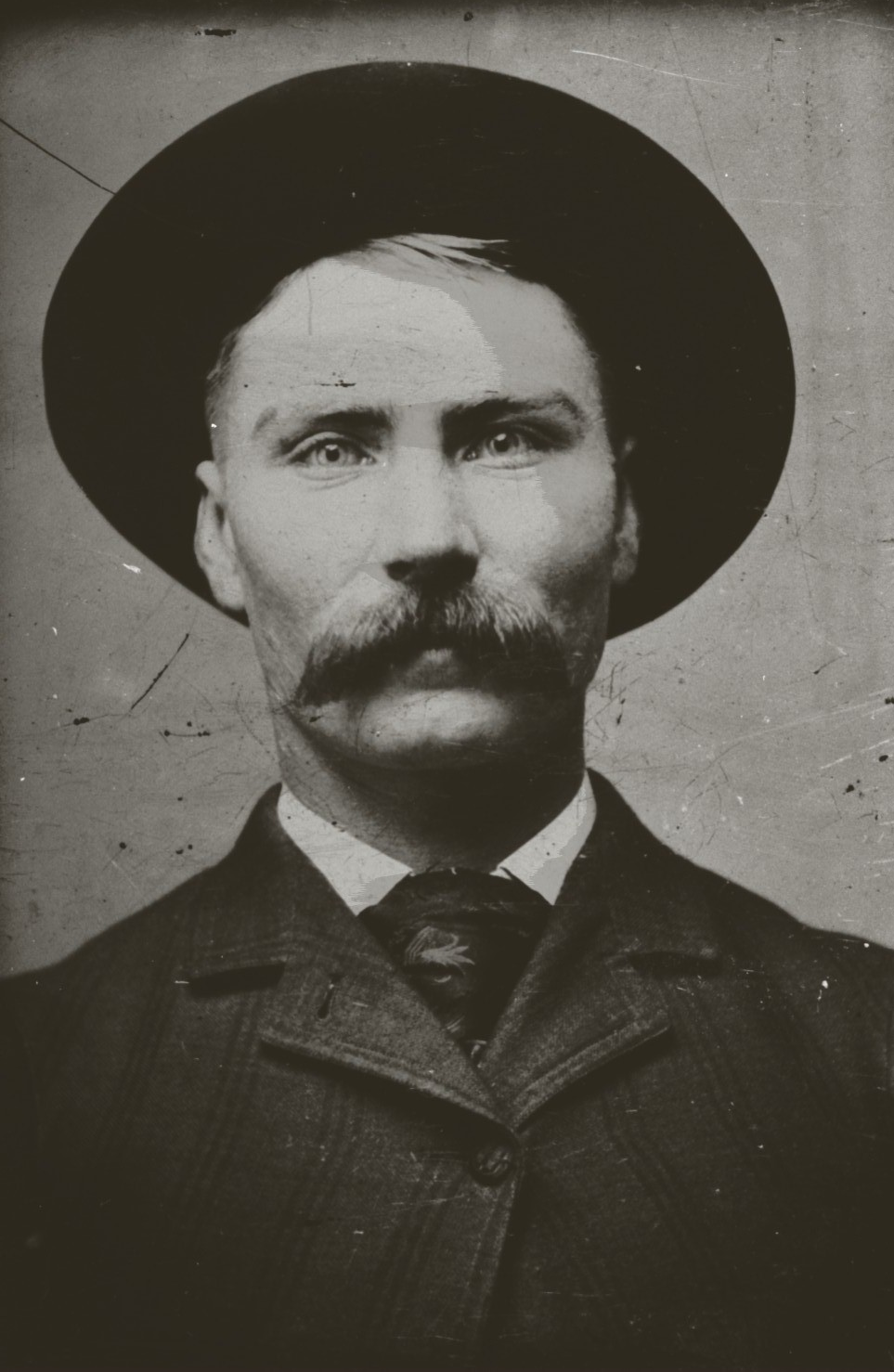
William R R Stowell; Circa 1843

William Rufus Rogers Stowell (September 23, 1822 – May 30, 1901) was a Mormon pioneer and early member of the Church of Christ (Latter Day Saints) established by Joseph Smith. Stowell was instrumental in establishing many settlements along the main Pioneer route between Nauvoo and Salt Lake City from 1846 to 1850, entering the Great Salt Lake Valley in 1850. After his arrival, Stowell also assisted in establishing many settlements in Utah including Fillmore, Ogden and Provo. Stowell's life is also notable for his role in the Utah War (1857-58), where he served as a lieutenant. The reports he gave to U.S. commanders during his capture likely delayed the overall conflict, buying the time needed to negotiate and reduce tensions on both sides.

== Early life ==
Stowell was born on September 23, 1822, in Solon, Oneida County, New York. In August 1825, his family moved to Westfield, Chautauqua County, New York, which was “heavily timbered country, requiring great labor to clear the ground for cultivation.” His father Augustus was a licensed attorney at law in the state of New York.

Although the family started with three acres of cleared land and a 14-by-14-foot (4.3 m × 4.3 m) stick shanty for a home, William along with his father and siblings, worked hard to eventually increase their farm to include 260 acres, a sawmill, “houses, barns, orchards and the conveniences and comforts of a wealthy farmer of that time.”

At about the age of six, William's leg was accidentally broken, and the bone healed naturally within a few weeks.

His father and elder half brother Dan were first introduced to the Latter Day Saint church in February 1833, when William was 10 years old. William himself was not baptized into the church until August 1834, when he was 11 years old.

In 1843, at the age of 21, Stowell left his home in Westfield, New York, with his mother and siblings to travel to Nauvoo, Illinois, and join the main body of Latter Day Saints who had gathered there. Stowell's parents had recently separated and his father and older half-siblings did not accompany the family.

In Nauvoo, Stowell became acquainted with Joseph Smith, and was eventually ordained an elder and a seventy by Joseph Smith and George A. Smith before being called on a mission to campaign for Joseph Smith for president. Stowell received his patriarchal blessing from Hyrum Smith.

== Mormon pioneer ==
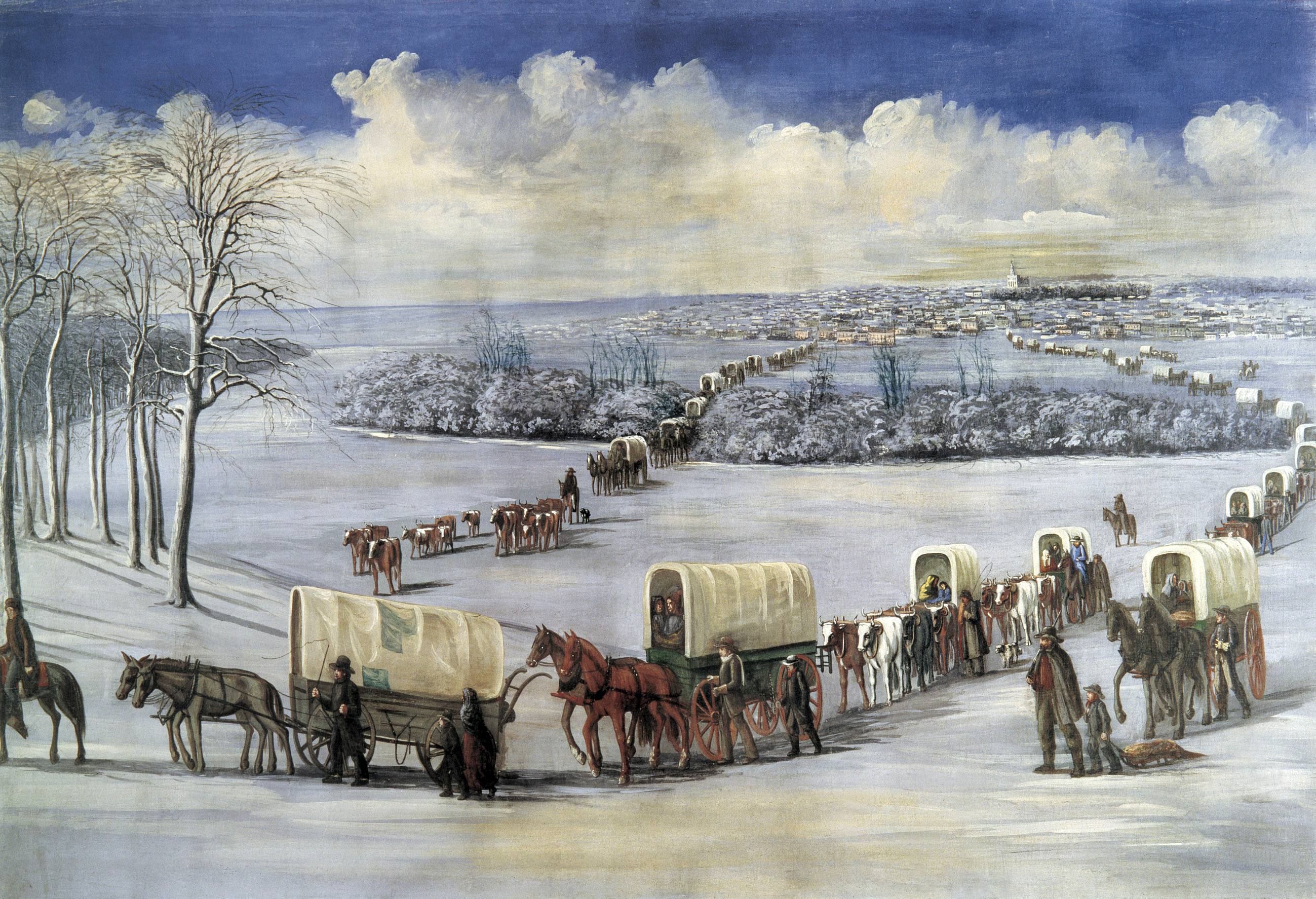
Crossing the Mississippi, February 1846

After the death of Joseph Smith in 1844, Stowell returned to Nauvoo, where he married Hannah Topham on Christmas Day 1844. Stowell assisted in the construction of the Nauvoo Temple and received his endowments in February 1846. When the Saints began leaving Nauvoo under mob pressure, Stowell assisted in ferrying many wagons across the Mississippi River before finally ferrying across himself in February 1846.

Stowell established homesteads in many settlements, building cabins and planting crops before handing them over to families traveling west before moving to the next homestead and starting again. He built homesteads in Shoal Creek, IA (1846), Garden Grove, IA (1846), Council Bluffs, IA (1847–49), and Nodaway County, MO (1849). William and Hannah's son William John, was born February 11, 1848, and died November 29, 1848, while living at Council Bluff, IA.

In late fall, early winter 1849, Apostle John Taylor stayed at Stowell's home in Missouri on his way to his latest mission assignment in Europe. While staying there, Stowell reported Apostle Taylor asking him, "[w]hen are you going to the mountains?" Taylor instructed Stowell, "When the next emigration is ready to go.... be on the banks of the Missouri River ready to go with them."

Stowell left Missouri in June 1850 with the company of Captain David Evans, founder of Evansville, Utah, and arrived in Great Salt Lake Valley a few months later in September 1850. While traveling, Stowell was a good shot with a rifle and helped to supply the wagon company with buffalo meat throughout their trek west.

Stowell eventually settled in Provo, UT in January 1851, buying a 25-acre plot of land and building a farm and cabin on the property. His sister Matilda Stowell Packard had also traveled to Provo with her husband the previous year, but on August 21, 1851, she died in childbirth. Without a way to care for their son, his father Orin Packard asked William and Hannah to care for the child until he remarried six months later and took the baby back home. However, Orrin Packard was killed in a wagon accident a few months later and Stowell again adopted his young nephew William Henry Packard, raising him as his own until adulthood.

Around this time in 1852, Stowell's wife Hannah became dissatisfied in her marriage and obtained a divorce from Stowell. She later remarried in 1853 into the family of her younger sister Sarah as the second wife of Pvt Joseph Clark who also lived in Provo.

On October 19, 1852, Stowell remarried to Cynthia Jane Park in Provo, the marriage performed by Apostle John Taylor.

Rather than farming in 1853, Stowell received frequent calls from the local militia to travel to nearby settlements and support Mormon settlers under threat of hostile natives. He served under Colonel Peter Conover on numerous expeditions in 1853.

In October 1853, Stowell's half brother Daniel, who had left Mormonism more than a decade earlier, arrived in Provo with his wife Louisa Barnum Stowell and their five children on their way to live with Louisa's parents in San Francisco. Stowell helped his brother secure housing in Provo. That fall, Brigham Young requested Stowell move his family to help establish the Mormon colony in Fillmore, Utah. Stowell moved his family to Fillmore before winter set in in 1853, and he began to assist building the new territorial statehouse for Utah as well as continued service in the militia.

== Family growth ==
During the winter of 1853–54, Stowell's half brother and sister-in-law fell ill. Louisa Barnum Stowell died February 16 followed by her husband Daniel on March 16, 1854. Upon receiving the news, Stowell traveled back to Provo to adopt their five orphaned children and bring them back to Fillmore. Stowell arrived home with the five orphans April 22, two days before his wife Cynthia gave birth to her first child, Brigham, on April 24, 1854. This left the young family caring for six orphaned children ages 2 to 13 years old along with their own infant son.

After assisting the settlement in Fillmore, Utah, Stowell moved his family to Ogden valley in June 1855, near a settlement called Bingham's Fort at the suggestion of Apostle George A. Smith. Stowell began preparing a farm and homestead near the Ogden river.

On October 9, 1855, Stowell married a widow from Bingham's Fort named Sophronia Kelly as a plural wife. The marriage was performed by Brigham Young in the Endowment House in Salt Lake City. Sophronia brought a 9-year-old son from her late husband with her to Stowell's family.

On January 6, 1856, his wife Cynthia gave birth to twin girls, Amanda and Miranda, and Sophronia gave birth to a daughter, Elvira, on September 12, 1856.

== Utah War ==
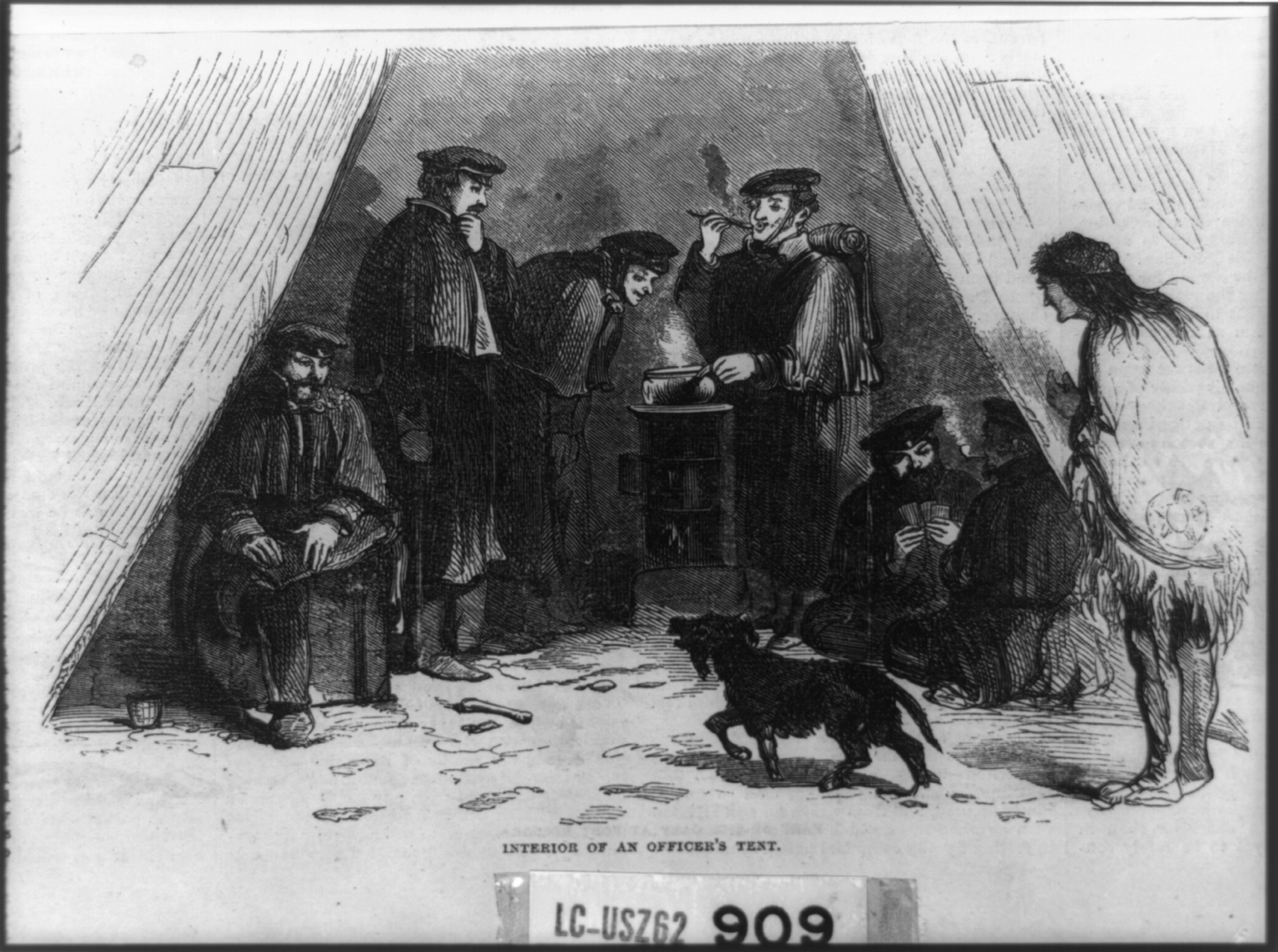
Interior of an Officer's Tent, Utah War

In 1857, a long string of events led up to the conflict known as the Utah War, where U.S. Pres. Buchanan sent a military escort of soldiers to support the installation of a new governor of the Utah Territory. In response to the approach of the U.S. army, the militia was organized as the Nauvoo Legion under Lieutenant General Daniel H. Wells and commanded by Major Joseph Taylor. Stowell was appointed adjutant to Major Taylor's battalion of infantry and on October 2, 1857, they marched for Echo Canyon, which is near Fort Bridger in present-day Wyoming.

When Stowell's company met up with Lt. General Daniel H. Wells, they exchanged information and new orders for the battalion. Stowell, being Major Joseph Taylor's adjutant, had the duty of carrying correspondence and letters to deliver to various command posts further up the line. Stowell carried a group of correspondence after the meeting with Wells, including orders from Wells to Joseph Taylor, Orin Porter Rockwell, John McAllister, Robert Burton, Lot Smith and others operating in the Echo Canyon region. On October 16, Stowell and Taylor encountered a camp in the fog ahead of them. Supposing them to be the battalion of Lot Smith, they approached, not realizing it was a detachment of US Army soldiers.

=== Captured ===
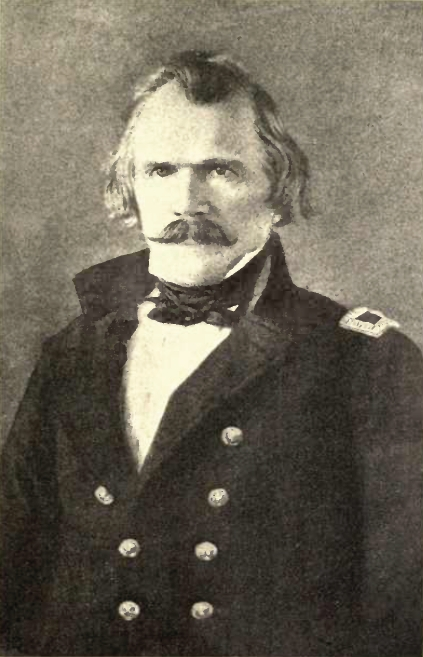
Col. Albert Johnston

The soldiers captured Stowell and Joseph Taylor and searched them for papers and correspondence. When questioned by US Army Col. Edmund Alexander, Stowell and Taylor gave exaggerated accounts of "twenty-five to thirty thousand" Mormon militia camped in the mountains to repel the army. The reports by Stowell and Taylor created indecisiveness in army commanders who ultimately decided to halt their advance west until they could consult with Col. Albert Sidney Johnston who did not arrive until November 4, 1857. The decision to wait proved to be disastrous when a series of calamities befell the troops, including frost-bite, heavy snow, and the death of many of the supply animals as winter set in.

On November 16, the army arrived in Fort Bridger and discovered it had been burned by militiamen. Colonel Johnston established Camp Scott nearby which became his winter quarters to house military operations. Eckelsville was established a short distance from Camp Scott, named for Chief Justice Delana R. Eckels. It housed individuals from the government, diplomatic and civilian elements traveling with the army, including Eckels himself as well as Governor Cumming, his wife and various other individuals who had accompanied the military escort.

Some time in early November 1857, Stowell assisted Maj. Joseph Taylor in escaping their captors. Taylor returned to Salt Lake City, delivering a report of Stowell's capture to Brigham Young. On November 26, 1857, Brigham Young wrote letter to Colonel Johnston at Fort Bridger inquiring of the prisoners and stating of William "....if you imagine that keeping, mistreating or killing Mr. Stowell will resound to your advantage, future experience may add to the stock of your better judgment." Stowell remained a prisoner of war for the remainder of the conflict.

=== Arraignment for high treason ===
At Eckelsville, Chief Justice Eckels and Governor Cumming set up a temporary seat of territorial government. Eckels convened a grand jury on December 30, which indicted twenty Mormons for high treason, including Brigham Young, Heber C. Kimball, Daniel H. Wells, John Taylor, George D. Grant, Lot Smith, Orrin Porter Rockwell, William A. Hickman, Albert Carrington, Joseph Taylor, Robert Burton, James Ferguson, Ephraim Hanks and Stowell, among others. On January 5, 1858, Justice Eckels held a court proceeding where Stowell was arraigned in person on behalf of all of the defendants on charges of high treason. Stowell pled not guilty and requested more time to prepare for trial. Not believing he would get a fair trail, Stowell devised a plan to escape which he executed soon after the proceedings. However, after escaping on foot heavy snowfall thwarted his escape attempt and he was forced to turn back to Camp Scott to avoid freezing. Stowell's food rations were greatly reduced as punishment for the attempted escape.

=== Negotiations ===
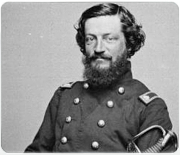
Thomas L. Kane helped negotiate an end to the Utah War conflict

Thomas L. Kane traveled by steamer from New York to California, then by overland trail to Utah to help negotiate a peace agreement between the United States and Mormon leaders. When he arrived in February 1858, Mormons referred to him as “the man the Lord had raised up as a peacemaker.” Kane met with Brigham Young in Salt Lake City and although he was a non-Mormon, he and Young had a warm friendship dating back before the Pioneers had left Nauvoo. Young directed Kane to “please learn what you can in regard to Stowel[l], and what their intentions are toward him."

After his meeting with Brigham Young, Kane traveled to Camp Scott arriving on March 10, 1858. After deliberations, Governor Cumming and a small non-military escort which included Thomas Kane, left Camp Scott on April 5 and traveled to Salt Lake to formally install the new Governor. Governor Cumming was welcomed to Utah by "its most distinguished citizens" on April 12, 1858. Three days later, word was sent to Colonel Johnston that the governor had been properly received by the people and was able to fully discharge his duties as governor.

While in Salt Lake City, Stowell's wife Cynthia heard the governor had come into the city was granted a meeting with Governor Cumming. Cynthia gave the governor an account of the condition of William's family. About six months after William had been captured, both wives had given birth about two weeks apart from one another. They had only the older orphan boys and the help of neighbors to assist them with a large family. The governor was sympathetic to the family situation and gave Cynthia $10, which she used to buy material to make much needed clothes for the children. Cynthia gave the governor a letter addressed to William, which he promised to deliver upon his return to Camp Scott.

Governor Cumming arrived back to Camp Scott in the third week of May to retrieve his belongings and begin preparations for his family to travel to the Salt Lake valley. He also sent Cynthia's letter to be delivered to William. When William received it, he sought a meeting with the governor. The governor was reportedly astonished to see Stowell's condition. After four months of reduced rations, Stowell was severely emaciated and dirty with an iron ball and chain attached to one leg. Stowell reports the governor "wiped tears from his eyes" at the site of his condition.

At the end of May, Major Benjamin McCulloch of Texas and Kentucky senator-elect Lazarus W. Powell arrived at Camp Scott as peace commissioners with a proclamation of general pardon from President Buchanan. On June 1, William Stowell was released with a requirement to swear an allegiance to the United States government. He traveled with the peace commissioners back to Salt Lake City to be reunited with his family.

== Life on the Ogden Homestead ==
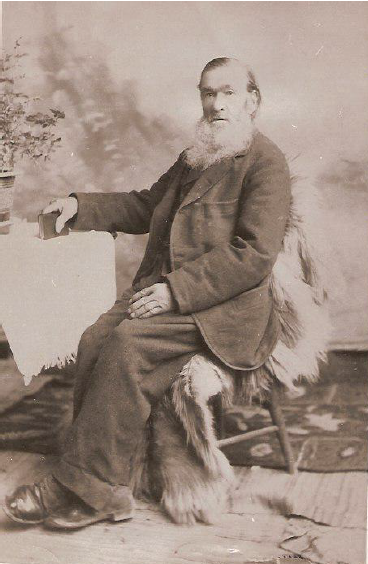
William Stowell, circa 1860s

William arrived in Payson, UT on June 10, 1858, where his family had moved during the exodus to Ogden and Salt Lake in anticipation of the army. The family made preparations to return to their homestead in Ogden. On the trip back to Ogden, the two infants who had been born during William's captivity, fell ill and never recovered. On October 15, 1858, Cynthia's infant son Rufus died, followed by Sophronia's infant daughter Mary, who passed 3 days later. Both babies were six months old. On August 15, 1860, William married Harriet Eliza Stowell in the Endowment House in Salt Lake City.

The Stowells farmed their Ogden homestead as well as raising sheep for wool. When the Union Pacific Railroad began approaching Ogden with their portion of the transcontinental railroad in the spring of 1867, William was employed by Union Pacific to assist in constructing the railroad line to its final point in Promontory, UT. Stowell became a member of the Deseret Agriculture and Manufacturing Society. The family built a fair measure of wealth and prosperity through farming, livestock and various enterprises over the course of the next decade.

In 1882, the Edmund's anti-bigamy act was signed into law, giving previous statutes resources to pursue Latter-Day Saints for unlawful cohabitation. William volunteered for a genealogy mission to the Eastern states hoping the trouble would subside. He retraced many of the same locations he had traveled on his journey west 30+ years before, including Nauvoo, and his hometown in New York before returning to Utah. He then traveled to California visiting relatives and gathering genealogy from his wife's side of the family. In June 1888, after many years on the underground, Stowell decided to turn himself in to face the charges against him. He received a fine for $233.40 and was allowed to go free.

== Move to Colonia Juarez, Mexico ==
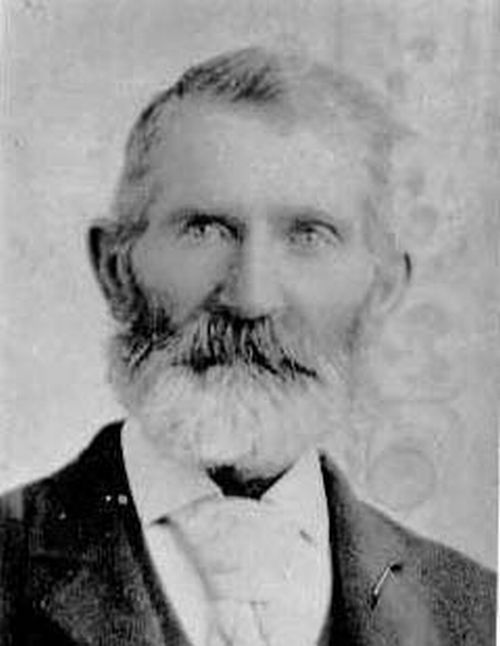
William Stowell as Church Patriarch

The Edmunds Act allowed for individuals to be charged for every incident of unlawful cohabitation, which meant William could face new charges at any moment. In 1888, Stowell made preparations to sell his enterprises and property in Ogden and move to Mexico where some Latter-Day Saints had moved to protect plural families facing persecution in the United States. Stowell's family was mostly grown. Many of his older children were already married and having children of their own. Some of Stowell's family traveled with him to Mexico, while others stayed in Utah. Stowell occasionally traveled back to Ogden by stagecoach and by train, but spent the majority of his time in Mexico. He hosted many LDS Church dignitaries at his home in Colonia Juarez when they came to visit.

While in Mexico, Stowell operated a gristmill that supplied flour to Colonia Juarez and nearby colonies. He was ordained a Patriarch in the Church of Jesus Christ of Latter-day Saints in December 1895.

After a trip to Utah and Idaho in May 1901, Stowell traveled back to Colonia Juarez. He contracted pneumonia soon afterward and died at his home on May 30, 1901. He was 78.
