= Elias H. Blackburn =

American politician

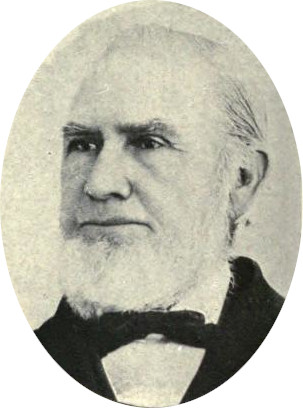
- Born: September 17, 1827; Bedford County, Pennsylvania
- Died: April 6, 1908 (aged 80); Loa, Utah
- Known for: First bishop of the Church of Jesus Christ of Latter-day Saints in Provo, Utah

Elias Hicks Blackburn (September 17, 1827 – April 6, 1908) was the first bishop of the Church of Jesus Christ of Latter-day Saints (LDS Church) of Provo and later served as a member of the Utah Territorial Legislature.

== Biography ==
Blackburn was born in Bedford County, Pennsylvania. He became bishop of Provo when a ward was organized there in 1851. In 1859 he served a mission to Great Britain. In 1863 he was sent by Church leaders to Beaver County, Utah to serve as Sunday School superintendent. In 1879 he moved to Wayne County, Utah where he was again made bishop of Loa, Utah until 1889. In 1882 he was elected to represent Piute and Beaver Counties in the territorial legislature.

Blackburn practiced polygamy and had six wives.

== Sources ==
- Andrew Jenson. LDS Biographical Encyclopedia vol. 1, p. 491-492.
